= List of birds of Alberta =

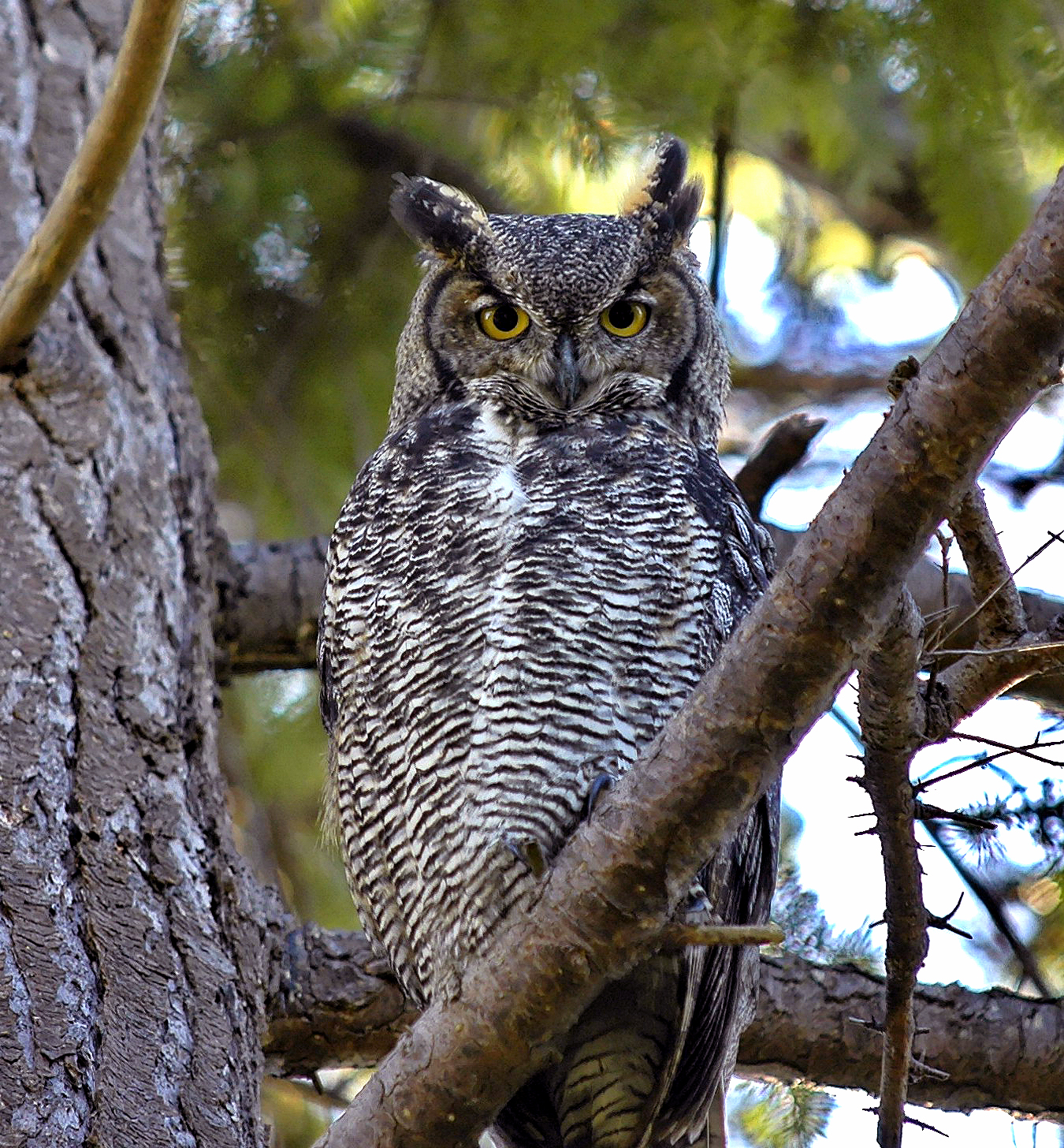
The great horned owl is the provincial bird of Alberta

Alberta is a landlocked province within Canada, bordered by British Columbia to the west, Saskatchewan to the east, the North-West Territories to the north, and the U.S. state of Montana to the south. The northern part of the province is largely boreal forest, leading into the Great Plains in the south-east. The south-west portion of the province is generally temperate coniferous forest, bordered by the Rocky Mountains. These different ecosystems, along with the border formed by the Rocky Mountains, contribute to the diversity of birds in the province. Notably, several "eastern" and "western" pairs can be seen in Alberta, such as the eastern bluebird and western bluebird. The Central Flyway passes through Alberta, along with a portion of the Prairie Pothole Region, contributing to the variety of bird species which breed in, or migrate through, the province.

Unless otherwise noted, the information provided is from the Official List of the Birds of Alberta, produced by the Alberta Bird Record Committee, which contains 438 species as of April 2023. Of these, 125 are accidentals, eight were introduced to Alberta, one species is extinct, and another is possibly extinct. This list is presented in the taxonomic sequence of the Check-list of North and Middle American Birds, 7th edition through the 62nd Supplement, published by the American Ornithological Society (AOS). Common and scientific names are also those of the Check-list, except that Canadian English spellings are used and the common names of families are from the Clements taxonomy because the AOS list does not include them.

The following tags are used to describe some categories of occurrence.

- (A) Accidental - a species that rarely or accidentally occurs in Alberta
- (B) Breeding - a species that currently breeds or has bred in Alberta
- (E) Extinct - a recent species that no longer exists
- (Ex) Extirpated - a species that no longer occurs in Alberta, but populations still exist elsewhere
- (I) Introduced - a species that has been introduced to Alberta by the actions of humans, either directly or indirectly

== Ducks, geese, and waterfowl ==
Order: Anseriformes Family: Anatidae

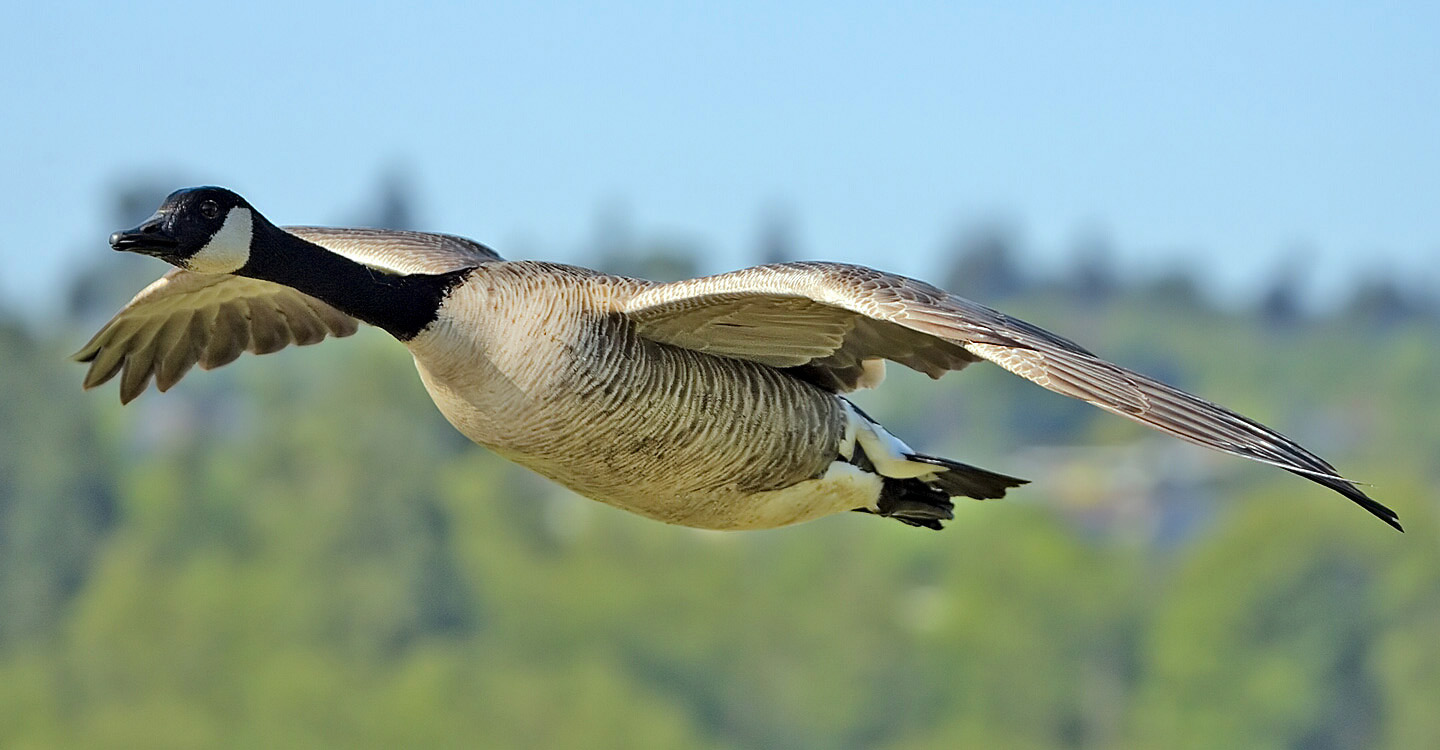
Canada goose

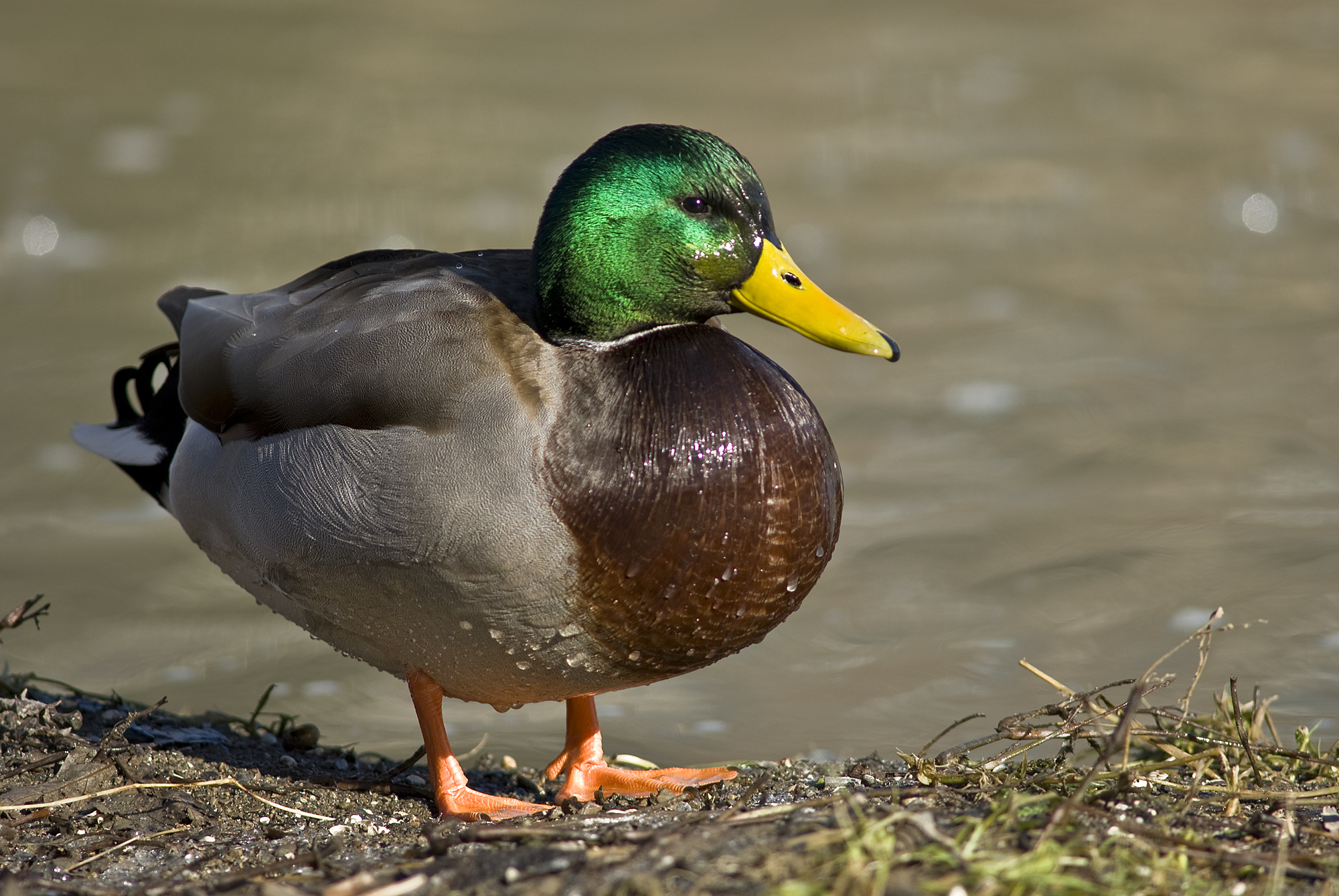
Male mallard

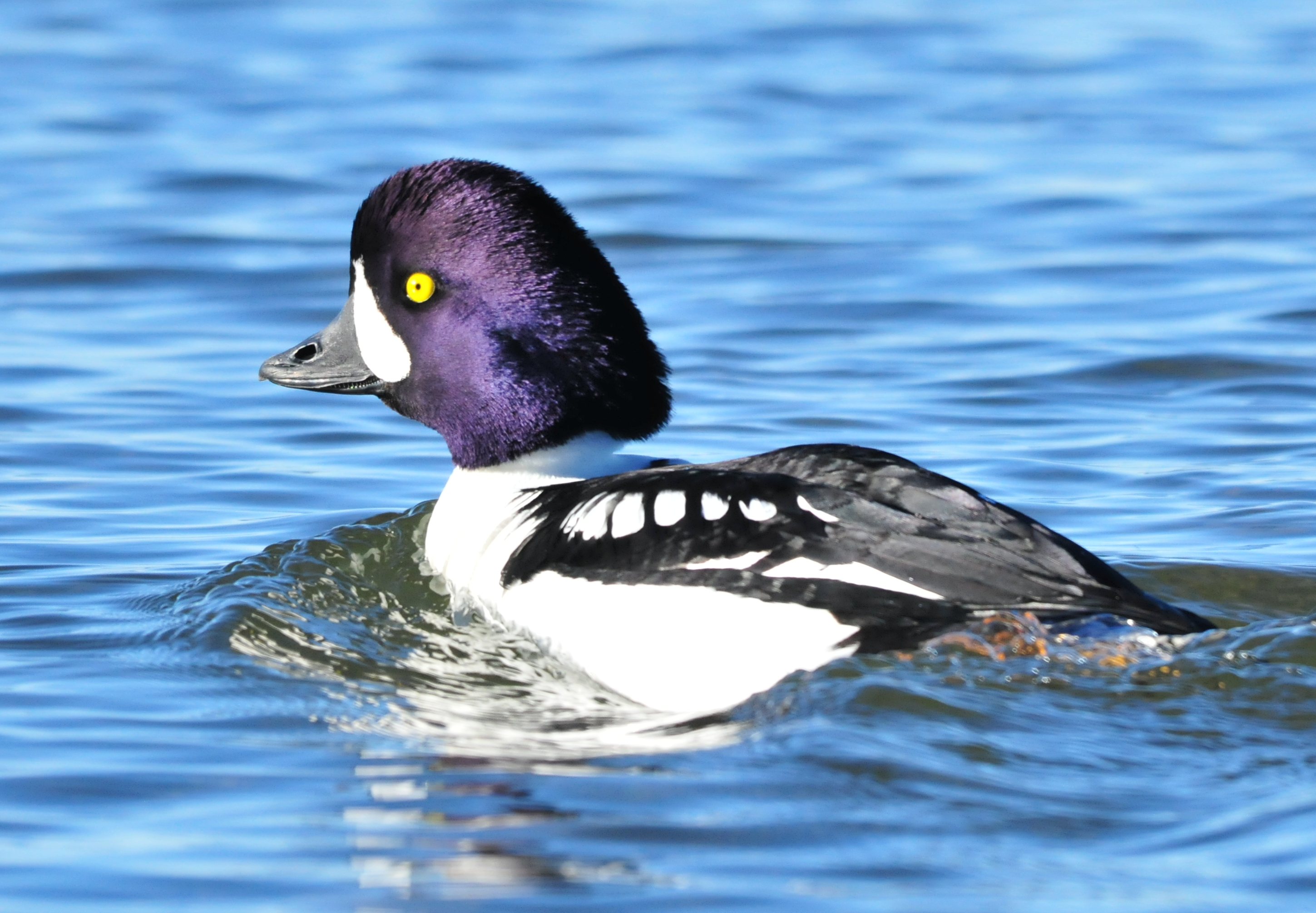
Barrow's goldeneye

Anatidae includes the ducks and most duck-like waterfowl, such as geese and swans. These birds are adapted to an aquatic existence with webbed feet, bills which are flattened to a greater or lesser extent, and feathers that are excellent at shedding water.

- Snow goose, Anser caerulescens
- Ross's goose, Anser rossii
- Greater white-fronted goose, Anser albifrons
- Tundra bean-goose, Anser serrirostris (A)
- Brant, Branta bernicla (A)
- Cackling goose, Branta hutchinsii
- Canada goose, Branta canadensis (B)
- Trumpeter swan, Cygnus buccinator (B)
- Tundra swan, Cygnus columbianus
- Wood duck, Aix sponsa (B)
- Garganey, Spatula querquedula (A)
- Blue-winged teal, Spatula discors (B)
- Cinnamon teal, Spatula cyanoptera (B)
- Northern shoveler, Spatula clypeata (B)
- Gadwall, Mareca strepera (B)
- Eurasian wigeon, Mareca penelope
- American wigeon, Mareca americana (B)
- Mallard, Anas platyrhynchos (B)
- American black duck, Anas rubripes (A)
- Northern pintail, Anas acuta (B)
- Green-winged teal, Anas crecca (B)
- Canvasback, Aythya valisineria (B)
- Redhead, Aythya americana (B)
- Ring-necked duck, Aythya collaris (B)
- Tufted duck, Aythya fuligula (A)
- Greater scaup, Aythya marila
- Lesser scaup, Aythya affinis (B)
- King eider, Somateria spectabilis (A)
- Common eider, Somateria mollissima (A)
- Harlequin duck, Histrionicus histrionicus (B)
- Surf scoter, Melanitta perspicillata (B)
- White-winged scoter, Melanitta deglandi (B)
- Black scoter, Melanitta americana (A)
- Long-tailed duck, Clangula hyemalis
- Bufflehead, Bucephala albeola (B)
- Common goldeneye, Bucephala clangula (B)
- Barrow's goldeneye, Bucephala islandica (B)
- Hooded merganser, Lophodytes cucullatus (B)
- Common merganser, Mergus merganser (B)
- Red-breasted merganser, Mergus serrator (B)
- Ruddy duck, Oxyura jamaicensis (B)

== Pheasants, grouse, and allies ==
Order: Galliformes Family: Phasianidae

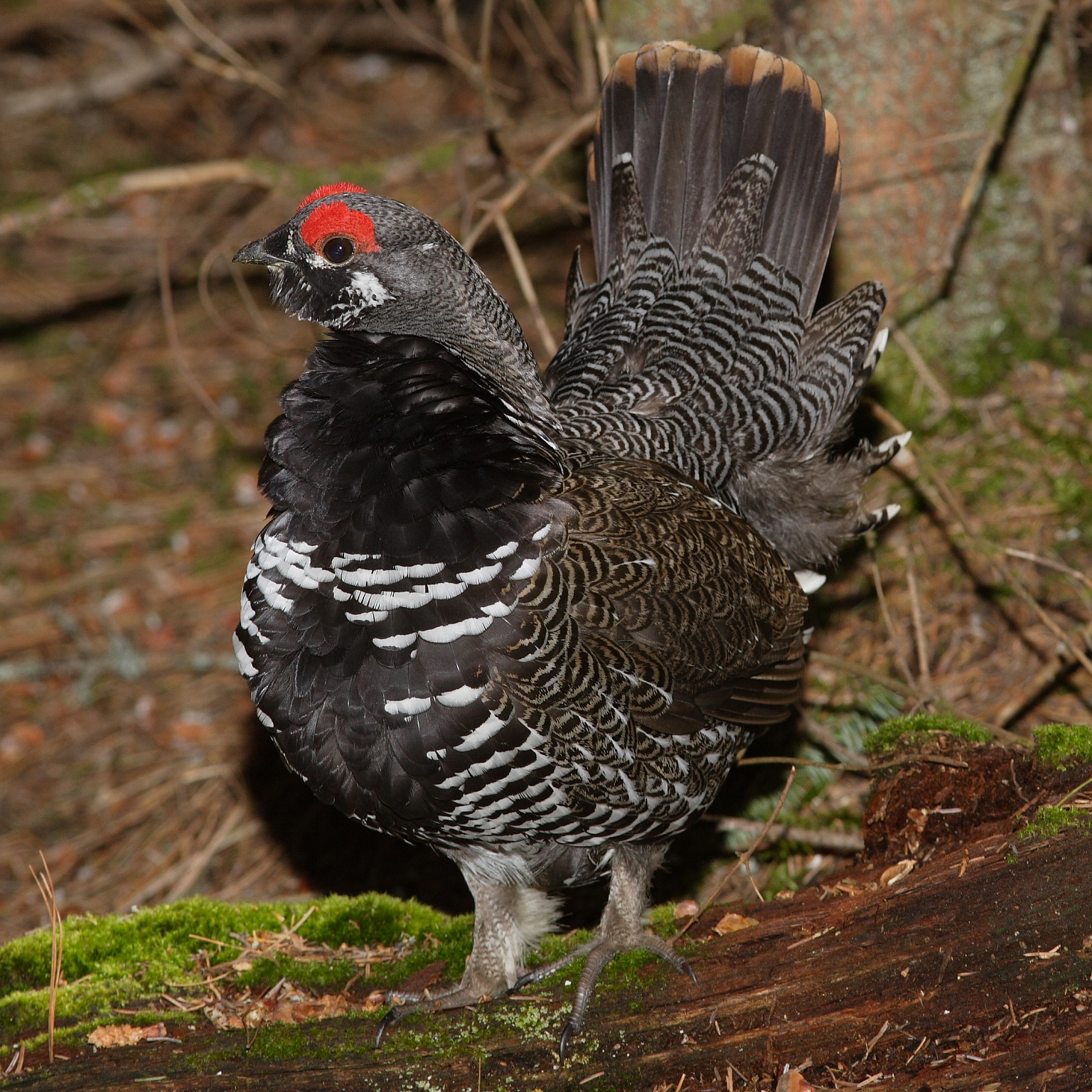
Spruce grouse

Phasianidae consists of the pheasants and their allies. These are terrestrial species, variable in size but generally plump with broad relatively short wings. Many species are gamebirds or have been domesticated as a food source for humans.

- Wild turkey, Meleagris gallopavo (B) (I)
- Ruffed grouse, Bonasa umbellus (B)
- Spruce grouse, Canachites canadensis (B)
- Willow ptarmigan, Lagopus lagopus (B)
- Rock ptarmigan, Lagopus mutus (A)
- White-tailed ptarmigan, Lagopus leucurus (B)
- Greater sage-grouse, Centrocercus urophasianus (B)
- Dusky grouse, Dendragapus obscurus (B)
- Sharp-tailed grouse, Tympanuchus phasianellus (B)
- Greater prairie-chicken, Tympanuchus cupido (Ex)
- Grey partridge, Perdix perdix (B)(I)
- Ring-necked pheasant, Phasianus colchicus (I)

== Grebes ==
Order: Podicipediformes Family: Podicipedidae

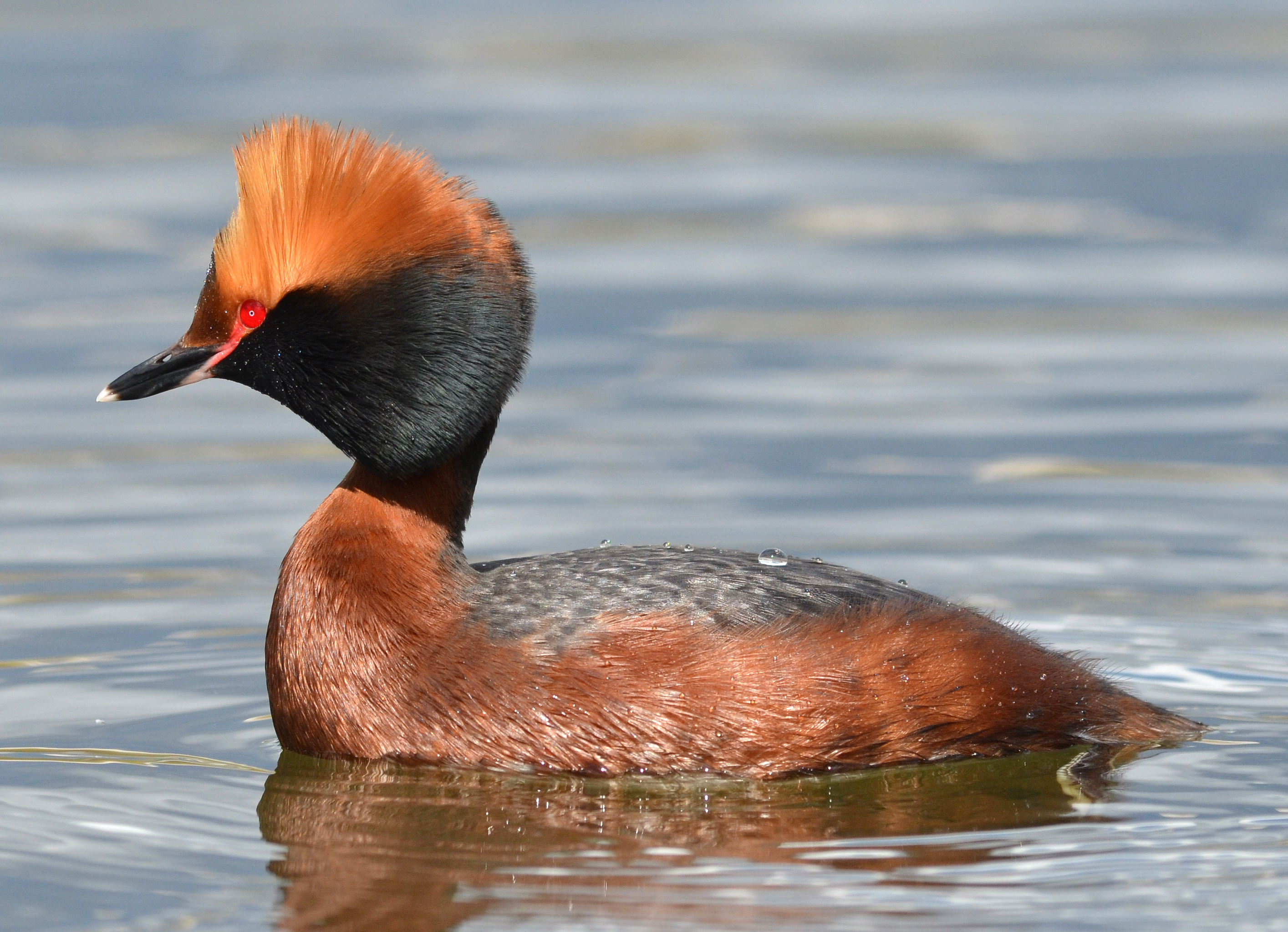
Horned grebe

Grebes are small to medium-large freshwater diving birds. They have lobed toes and are excellent swimmers and divers. However, they have their feet placed far back on the body, making them quite ungainly on land.

- Pied-billed grebe, Podilymbus podiceps (B)
- Horned grebe, Podiceps auritus (B)
- Red-necked grebe, Podiceps grisegena (B)
- Eared grebe, Podiceps nigricollis (B)
- Western grebe, Aechmorphorus occidentalis (B)
- Clark's grebe, Aechmorphorus clarkii (B)

== Pigeons and doves ==
Order: Columbiformes Family: Columbidae

Pigeons and doves are stout-bodied birds with short necks and short slender bills with a fleshy cere. They have strong flight muscles, allowing them to take off almost vertically and fly for long distances.

- Rock pigeon, Columba livia (B) (I)
- Band-tailed pigeon, Patagioenas fasciata (A)
- Eurasian collared-dove, Streptopelia decaocto (B) (I)
- Passenger pigeon, Ectopistes migratorius (E)
- White-winged dove, Zenaida asiatica (A)
- Mourning dove, Zenaida macroura (B)

== Cuckoos ==
Order: Cuculiformes Family: Cuculidae

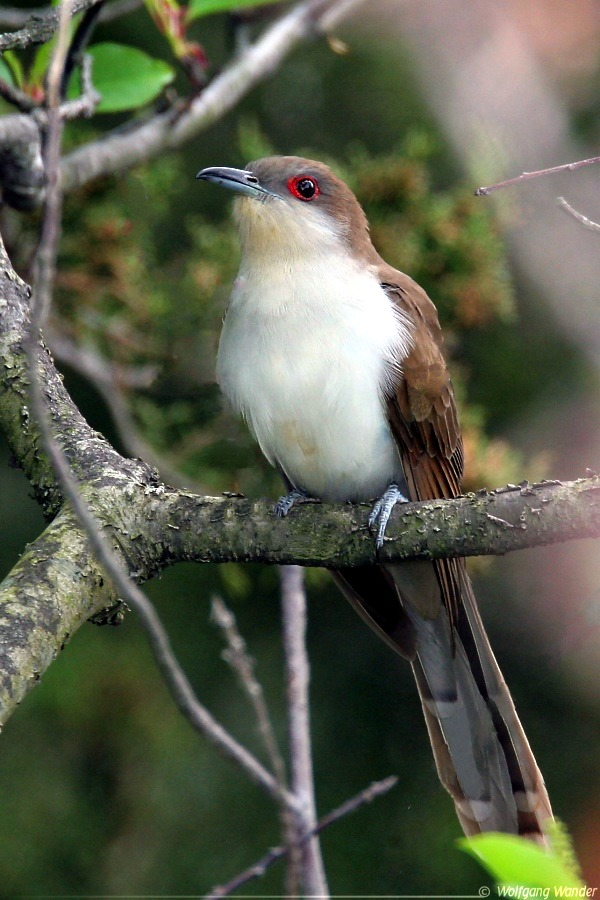
Black-billed cuckoo

The family Cuculidae includes cuckoos, roadrunners, and anis. These birds are of variable size with slender bodies, long tails, and strong legs.

- Yellow-billed cuckoo, Coccyzus americanus (A)
- Black-billed cuckoo, Coccyzus erythropthalmus (B)

== Nightjars and allies ==
Order: Caprimulgiformes Family: Caprimulgidae

Nightjars are medium-sized nocturnal birds that usually nest on the ground. They have long wings, short legs, and very short bills. Most have small feet, of little use for walking, and long pointed wings. Their soft plumage is cryptically coloured to resemble bark or leaves.

- Common nighthawk, Chordeiles minor (B)
- Common poorwill, Phalaenoptilus nuttallii (B)

== Swifts ==
Order: Apodiformes Family: Apodidae

Swifts are small birds which spend the majority of their lives flying. These birds have very short legs and never settle voluntarily on the ground, perching instead only on vertical surfaces. Many swifts have long swept-back wings which resemble a crescent or boomerang.

- Black swift, Cypseloides niger (B)
- Chimney swift, Chaetura pelagica (A)
- Vaux's swift, Chaetura vauxi (A) (Possibly breeding)
- White-throated swift, Aeronautes saxatalis (A)

== Hummingbirds ==
Order: Apodiformes Family: Trochilidae

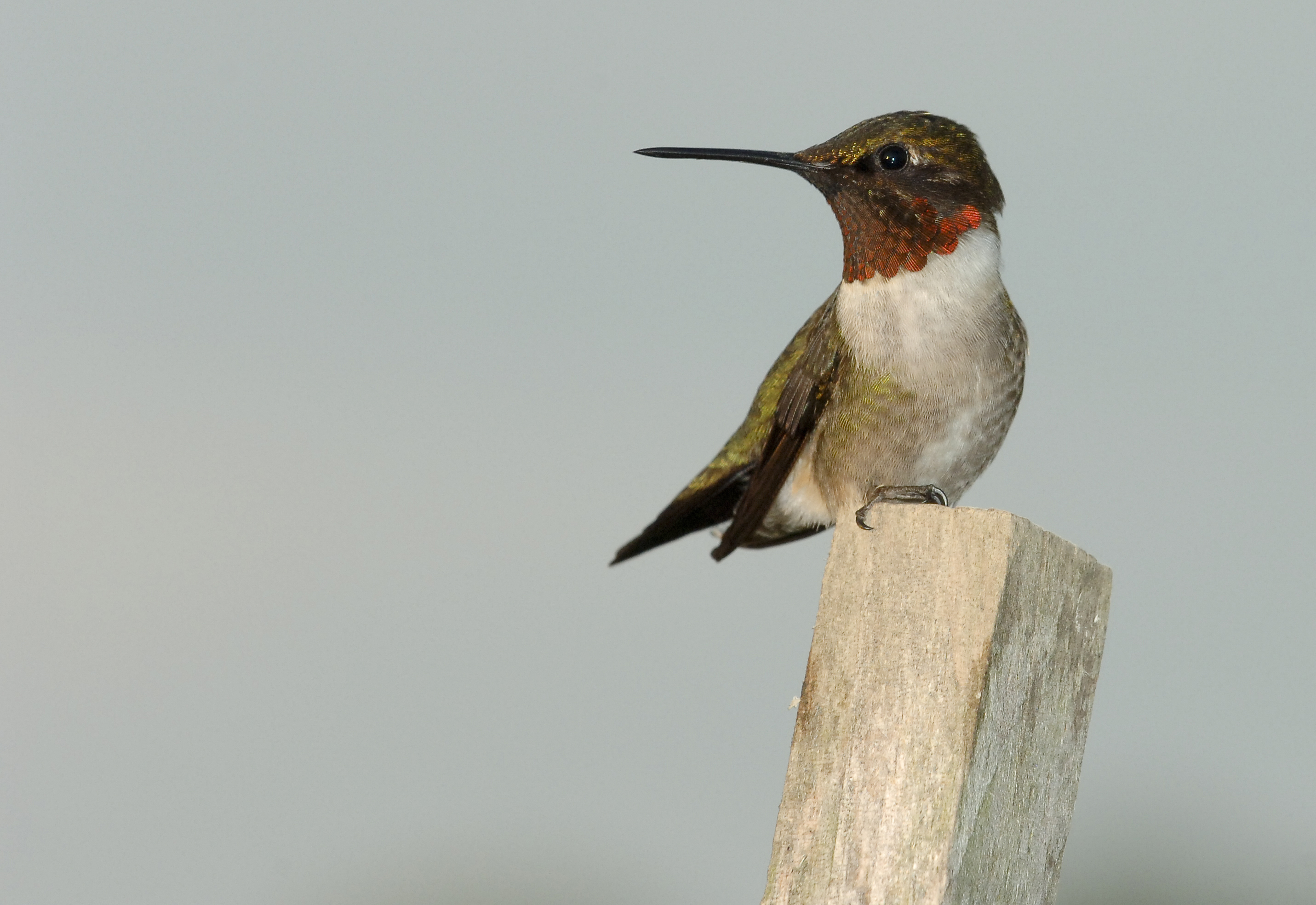
Ruby-throated hummingbird

Hummingbirds are small birds capable of hovering in mid-air due to the rapid flapping of their wings. They are the only birds that can fly backwards.

- Mexican violetear, Colibri thalassinus (A)
- Ruby-throated hummingbird, Archilochus colubris (B)
- Black-chinned hummingbird, Archilochus alexandri (A)
- Anna's hummingbird, Calypte anna (A)
- Costa's hummingbird, Calypte costae (A)
- Calliope hummingbird, Selasphorus calliope (B)
- Rufous hummingbird, Selasphorus rufus (B)
- Broad-tailed hummingbird, Selasphorus platycercus (A)
- Broad-billed hummingbird, Cynanthus latirostris (A)

== Rails, gallinules, and coots ==
Order: Gruiformes Family: Rallidae

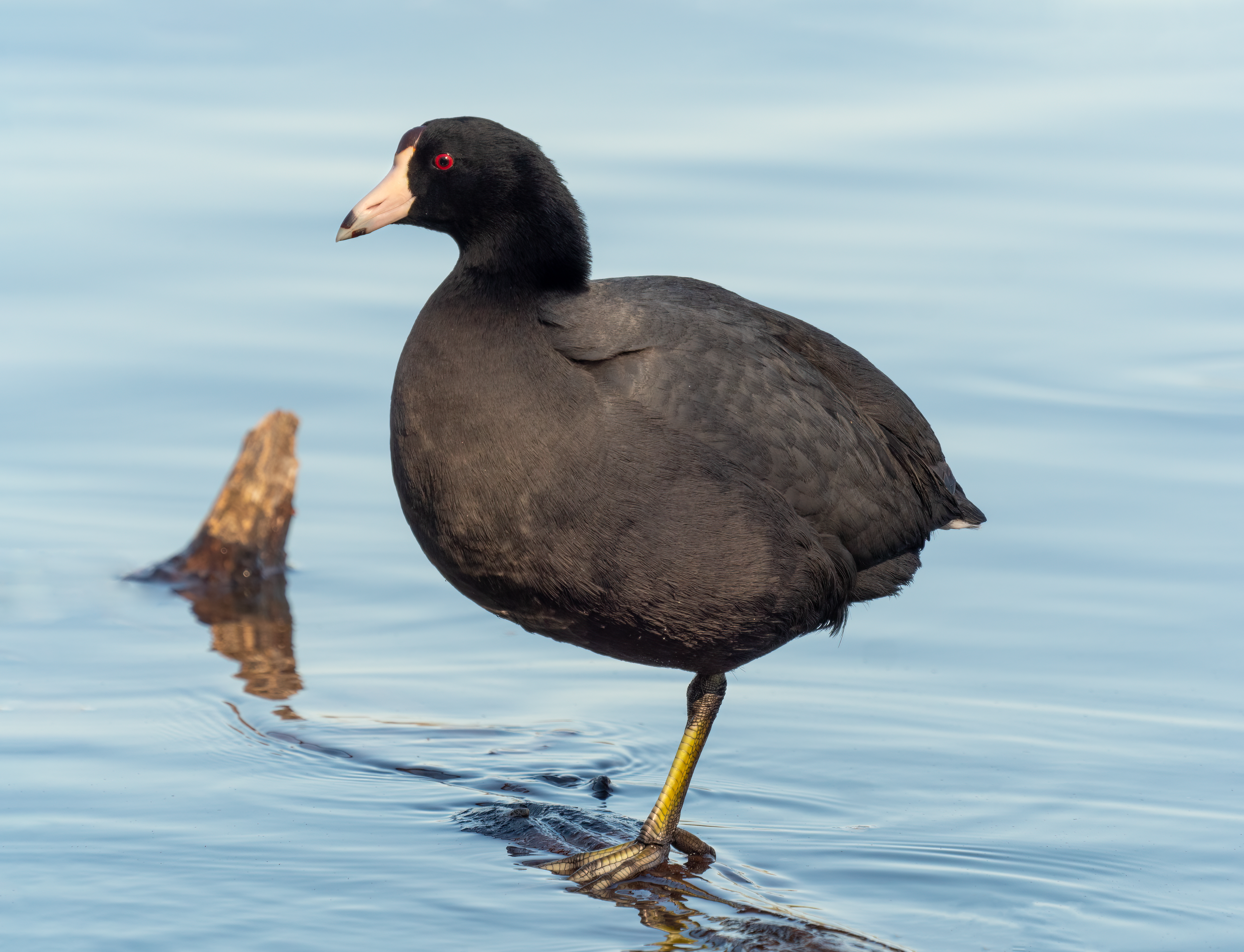
American coot

Rallidae is a large family of small to medium-sized birds which includes the rails, crakes, coots, and gallinules. Many species occupy dense vegetation in damp environments near lakes, swamps, or rivers. In general they are shy and secretive birds, making them difficult to observe. Most species have strong legs and long toes which are well adapted to soft uneven surfaces. They tend to have short, rounded wings and to be weak fliers.

- Virginia rail, Rallus limicola (B)
- Sora, Porzana carolina (B)
- Common gallinule, Gallinula galeata (A)
- American coot, Fulica americana (B)
- Yellow rail, Coturnicops noveboracensis (B)

== Cranes ==
Order: Gruiformes Family: Gruidae

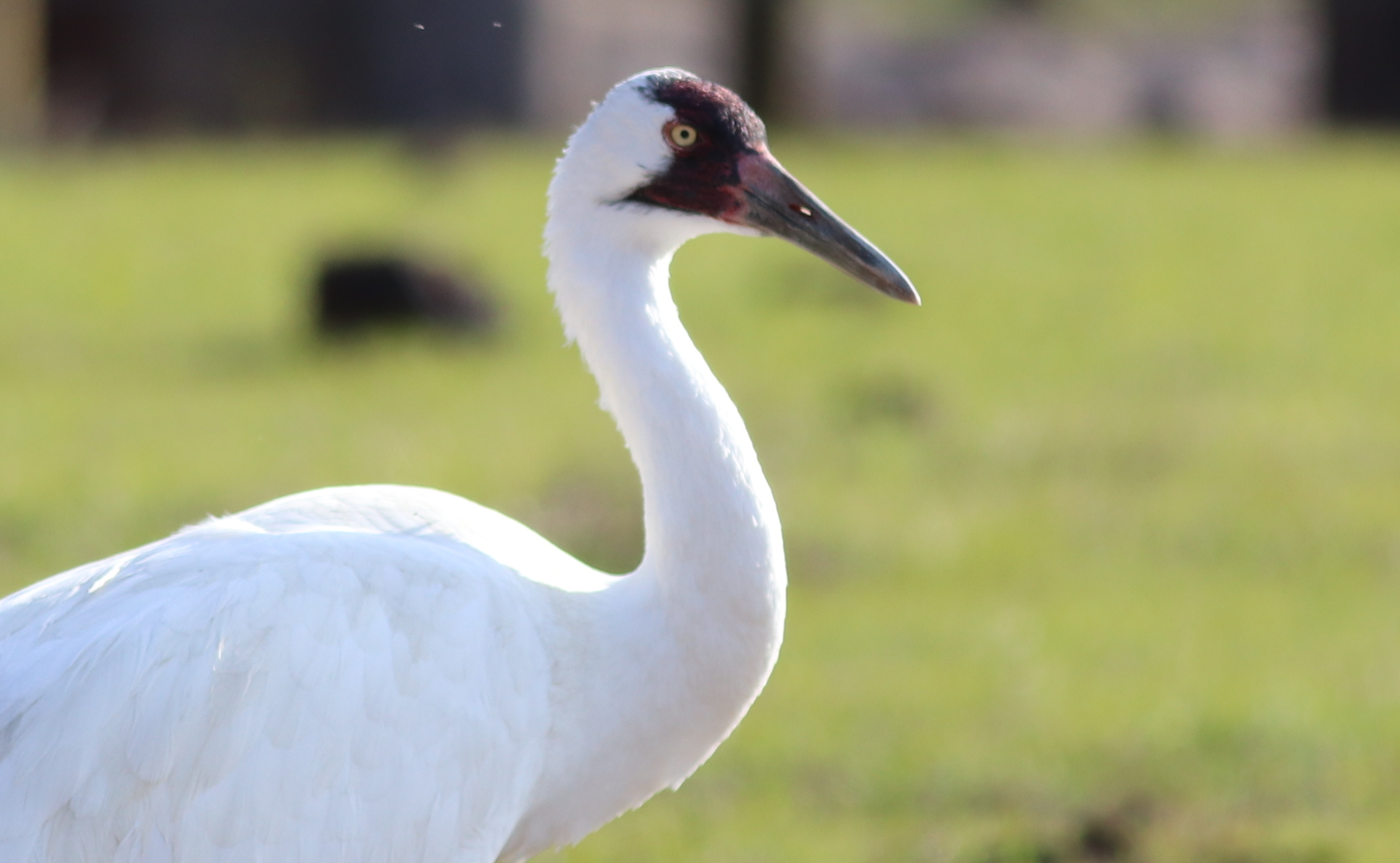
Whooping crane

Cranes are large, long-legged birds who fly with their distinctive long necks outstretched. Most have elaborate and noisy courting displays or "dances". The breeding grounds for the only wild population of whooping cranes is in Wood Buffalo National Park in northern Alberta.

- Sandhill crane, Antigone canadensis (B)
- Common crane, Grus grus (A)
- Whooping crane, Grus americana (B)

== Stilts and avocets ==
Order: Charadriiformes Family: Recurvirostridae

Recurvirostridae is a family of large wading birds which includes the avocets and stilts. The avocets have long legs and long up-curved bills. The stilts have extremely long legs and long, thin, straight bills.

- Black-necked stilt, Himantopus mexicanus (B)
- American avocet, Recurvirostra americana (B)

== Plovers and lapwings ==
Order: Charadriiformes Family: Charadriidae

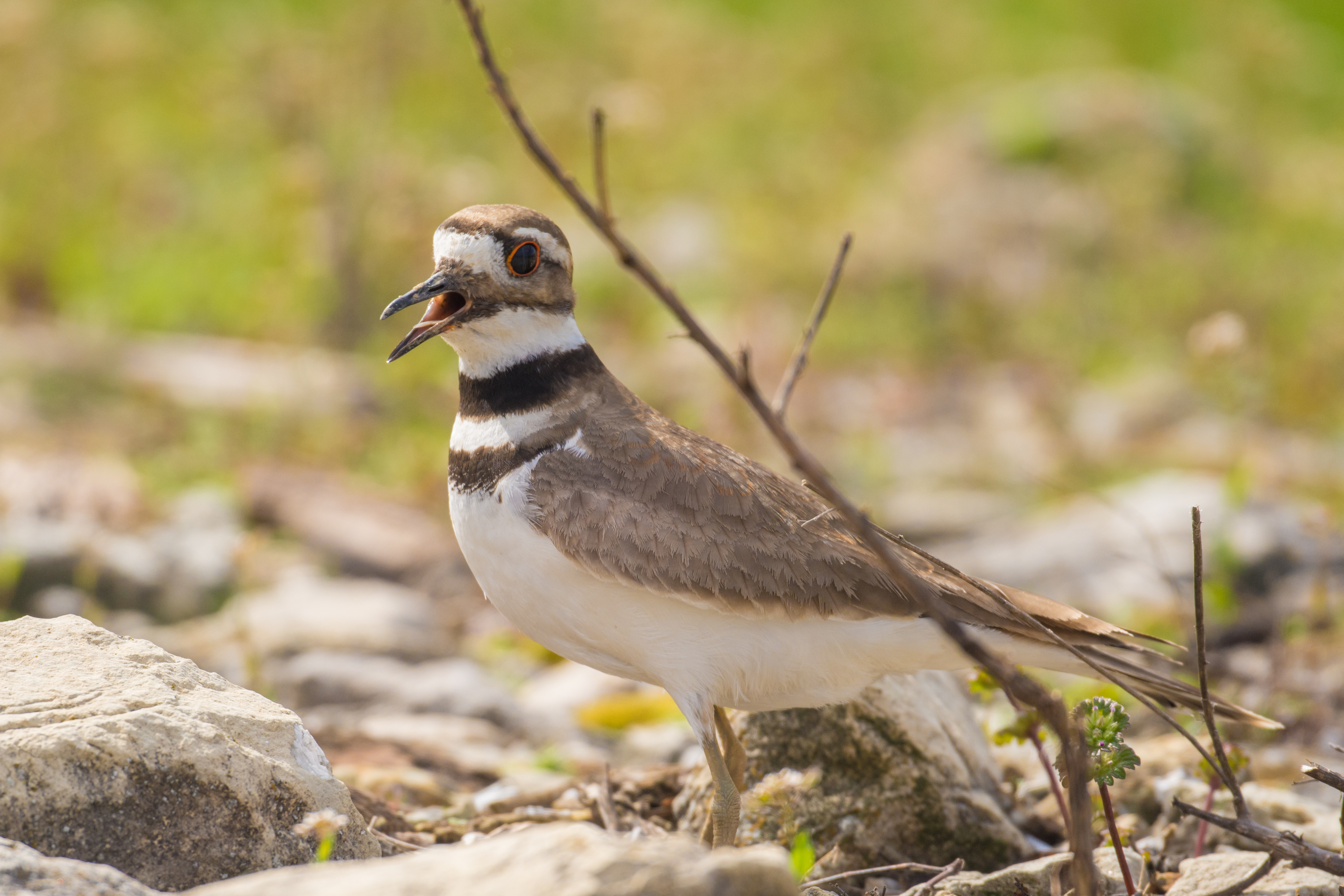
Killdeer

The family Charadriidae includes plovers, dotterels, and lapwings. They are small to medium-sized birds with compact bodies, short thick necks, and long, usually pointed, wings. They are found in open country worldwide, mostly in habitats near water.

- Black-bellied plover, Pluvialis squatarola
- American golden-plover, Pluvialis dominica
- Pacific golden-plover, Pluvialis fulva (A)
- Killdeer, Charadrius vociferus (B)
- Semipalmated plover, Charadrius semipalmatus (B)
- Piping plover, Charadrius melodus (B)
- Lesser sand-plover, Charadrius mongolus (A)
- Mountain plover, Charadrius montanus (B)
- Snowy plover, Charadrius nivosus (A)

== Sandpipers and allies ==
Order: Charadriiformes Family: Scolopacidae

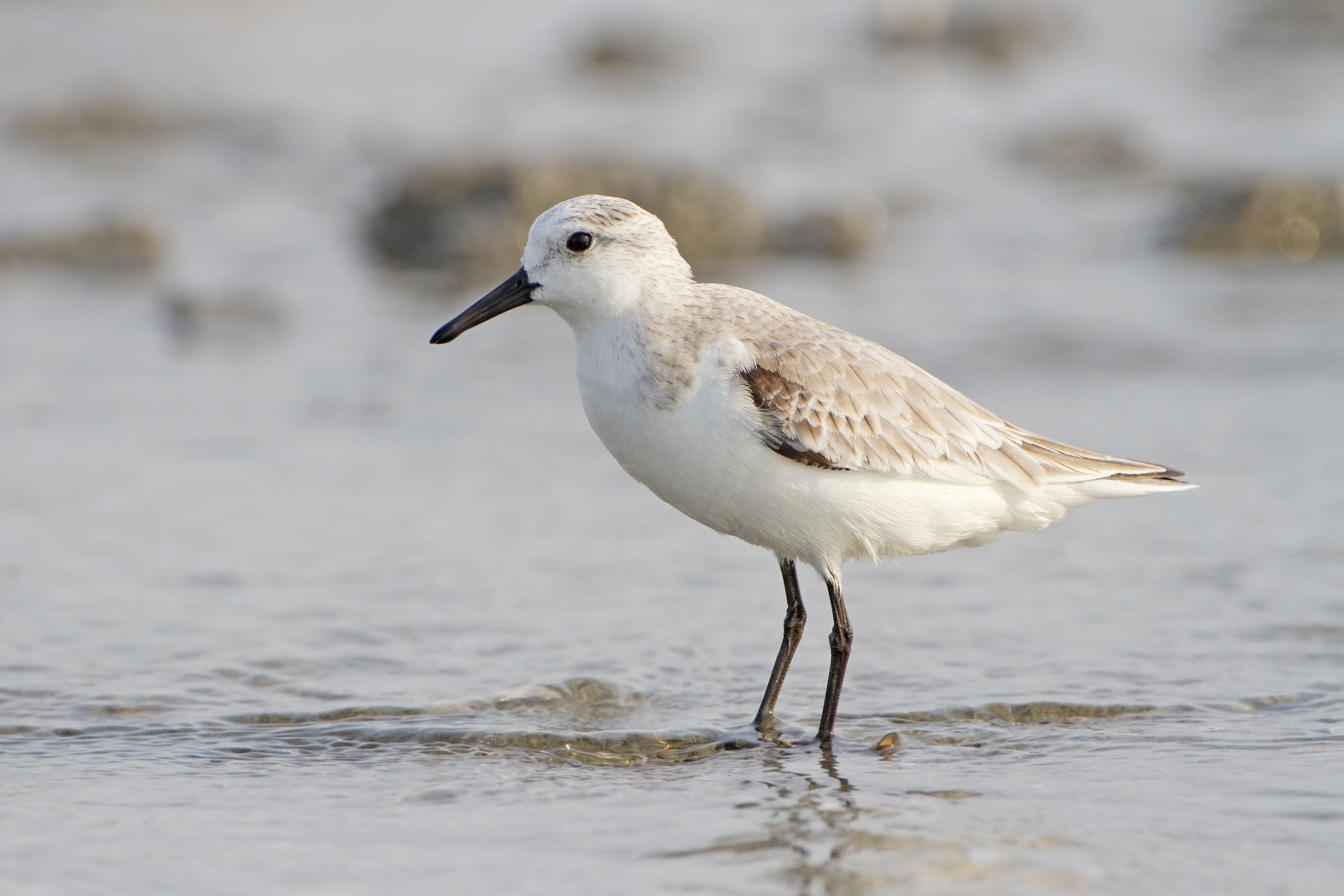
Sanderling

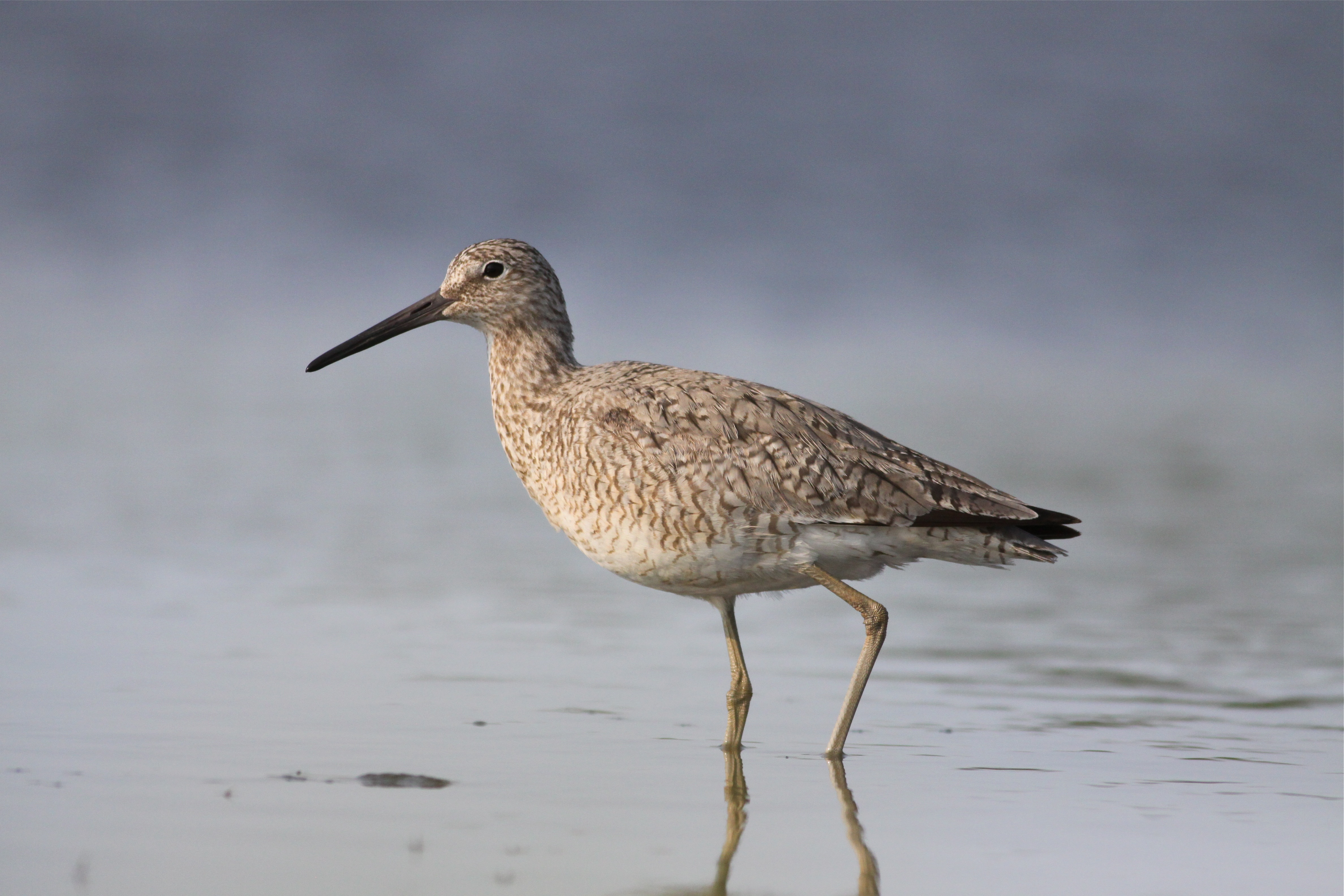
Willet

Scolopacidae is a large diverse family of small to medium-sized shorebirds including the sandpipers, curlews, godwits, shanks, tattlers, woodcocks, snipes, dowitchers, and phalaropes. The majority of these species eat small invertebrates picked out of the mud or soil. Different lengths of legs and bills enable multiple species to feed in the same habitat, particularly on the coast, without direct competition for food.

- Upland sandpiper, Bartramia longicauda (B)
- Whimbrel, Numenius phaeopus
- Eskimo curlew, Numenius borealis (Possibly extinct)
- Long-billed curlew, Numenius americanus (B)
- Bar-tailed godwit, Limosa haemastica (A)
- Hudsonian godwit, Limosa haemastica
- Marbled godwit, Limosa fedoa (B)
- Ruddy turnstone, Arenaria interpres
- Black turnstone, Arenaria melanocephala (A)
- Red knot, Calidris canutus
- Surfbird, Calidris virgata (A)
- Ruff, Calidris pugnax (A)
- Sharp-tailed sandpiper, Calidris acuminata (A)
- Stilt sandpiper, Calidris himantopus
- Curlew sandpiper, Calidris ferruginea (A)
- Red-necked stint, Calidris ruficollis (A)
- Sanderling, Calidris alba
- Dunlin, Calidris alpina
- Purple sandpiper, Calidris maritima (A)
- Baird's sandpiper, Calidris bairdii
- Little stint, Calidris minuta (A)
- Least sandpiper, Calidris minutilla (Possibly breeding)
- White-rumped sandpiper, Calidris fuscicollis
- Buff-breasted sandpiper, Calidris subruficollis
- Pectoral sandpiper, Calidris melanotos
- Semipalmated sandpiper, Calidris pusilla
- Western sandpiper, Calidris mauri
- Short-billed dowitcher, Limnodromus griseus (B)
- Long-billed dowitcher, Limnodromus scolopaceus
- American woodcock, Scolopax minor (A)
- Wilson's snipe, Gallinago delicata (B)
- Spotted sandpiper, Actitis macularia (B)
- Solitary sandpiper, Tringa solitaria (B)
- Wandering tattler, Tringa incana (A)
- Lesser yellowlegs, Tringa flavipes (B)
- Willet, Tringa semipalmata (B)
- Spotted redshank, Tringa erythropus (A)
- Greater yellowlegs, Tringa melanoleuca (B)
- Wilson's phalarope, Phalaropus tricolor (B)
- Red-necked phalarope, Phalaropus lobatus (B)
- Red phalarope, Phalaropus fulicarius

== Skuas and jaegers ==
Order: Charadriiformes Family: Stercorariidae

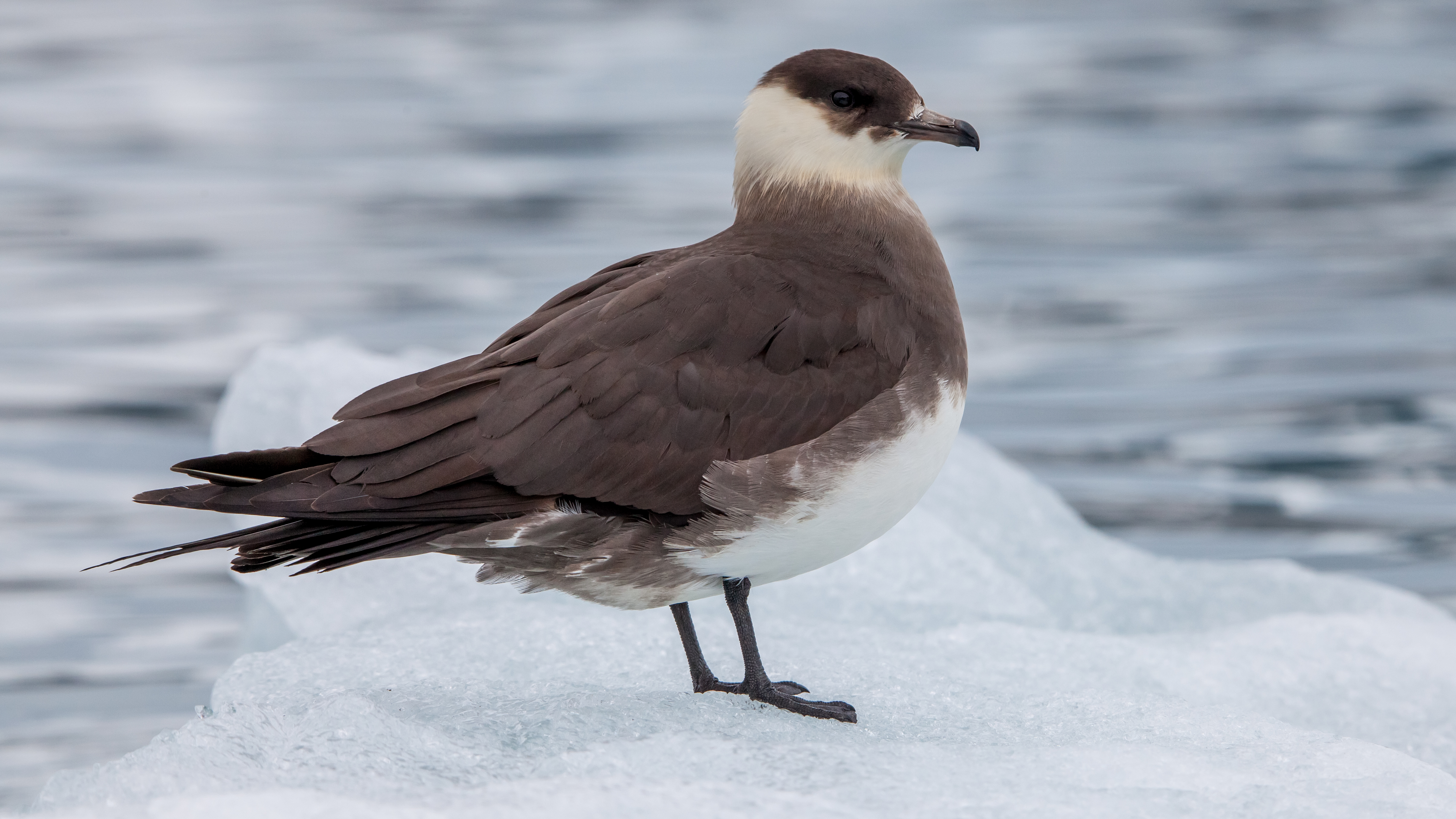
Parasitic jaeger

Skuas and jaegers are medium to large seabirds with strongly hooked talons, hooked beaks, and webbed feet. They are pelagic birds and feed on a variety of animals—such as fish, bird eggs, and lemmings—by hunting, scavenging, or kleptoparasitizing them.

- Pomarine jaeger, Stercorarius pomarinus (A)
- Parasitic jaeger, Stercorarius parasiticus
- Long-tailed jaeger, Stercorarius longicaudus (A)

== Auks, murres, and puffins ==
Order: Charadriiformes Family: Alcidae

Alcids are superficially similar to penguins due to their black-and-white colours, their upright posture, and some of their habits, however they are only distantly related to the penguins and are able to fly. Auks live on the open sea, only deliberately coming ashore to nest.

- Black guillemot, Cepphus grylle (A)
- Long-billed murrelet, Brachyramphus perdix (A)
- Ancient murrelet, Synthliboramphus antiquus (A)

== Gulls, terns, and skimmers ==
Order: Charadriiformes Family: Laridae

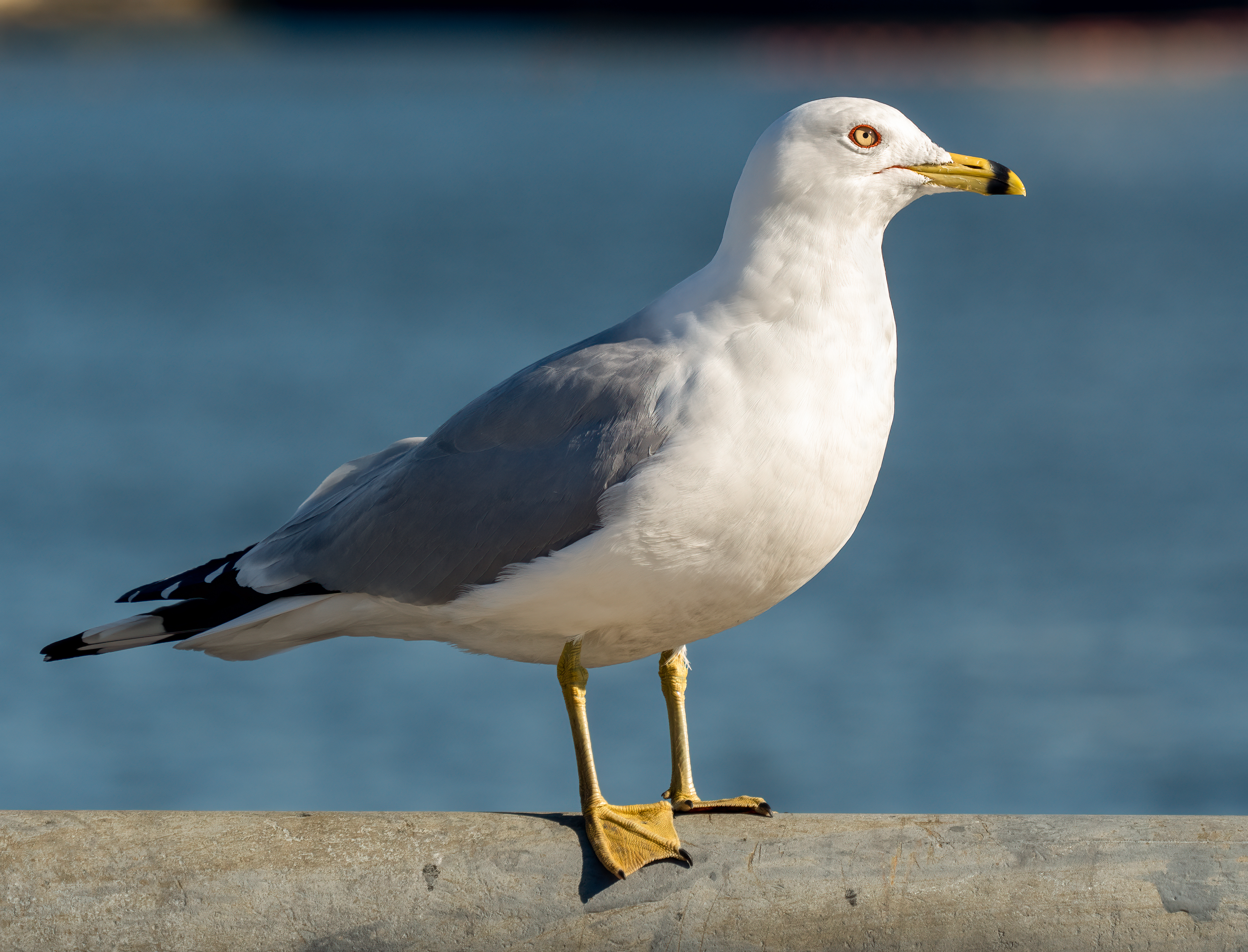
Ring-billed gull

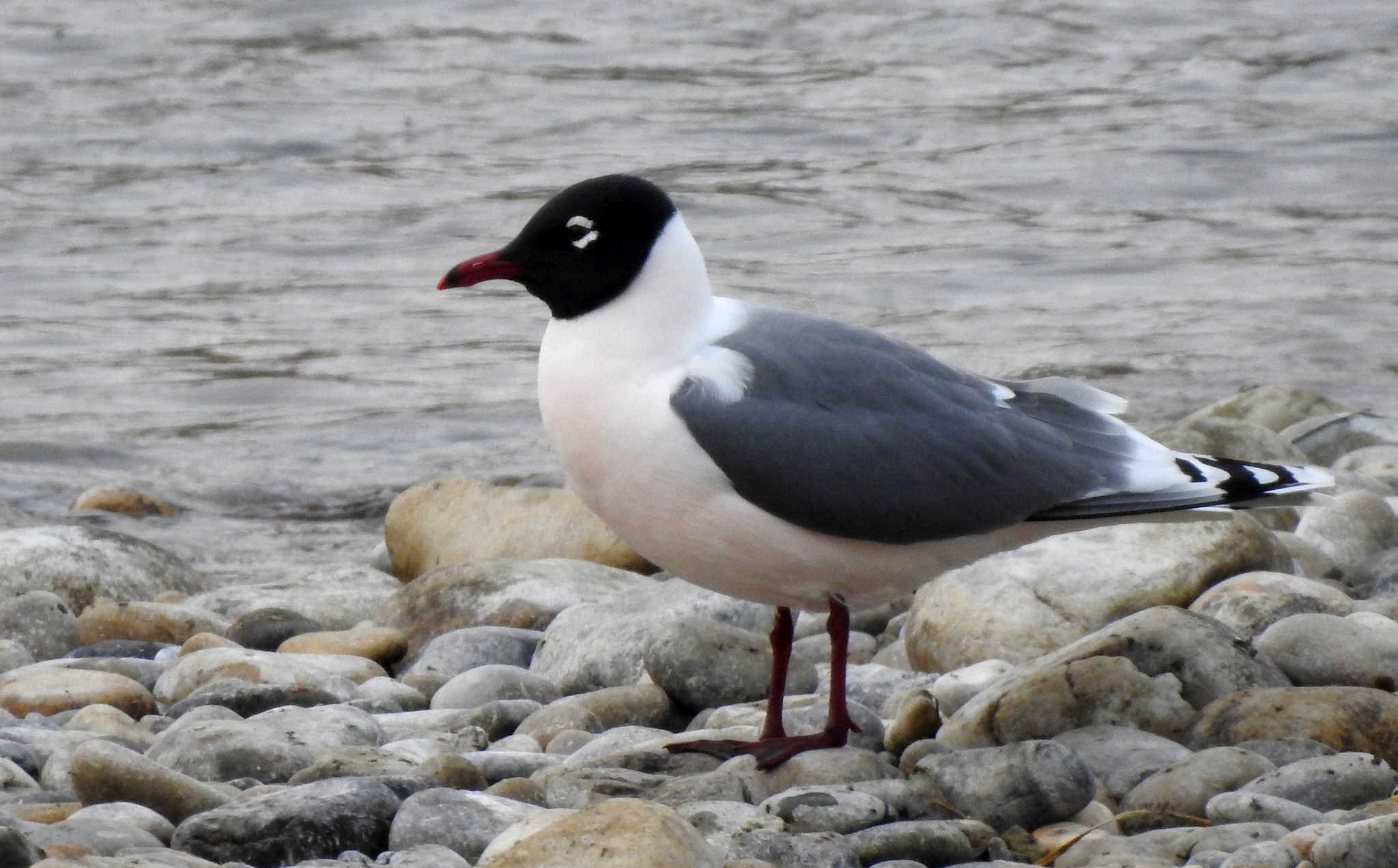
Franklin's gull

Laridae is a family of seabirds consisting of gulls, terns, and skimmers. Gulls are typically grey or white, often with black markings on the head or wings. Terns are generally smaller than gulls with more pointed wings and bills, many also having forked tails which help with aerial manoeuvrability. Both species can be found inland near lakes and rivers, however gulls have adapted well to human presence and can often be found in urban centers. Skimmers have not been recorded in Alberta.

- Black-legged kittiwake, Rissa tridactyla (A)
- Ivory gull, Pagophila eburnea (A)
- Sabine's gull, Xema sabini
- Bonaparte's gull, Chroicocephalus philadelphia (B)
- Black-headed gull, Chroicocephalus ridibundus (A)
- Little gull, Hydrocoleus minutus (A)
- Franklin's gull, Leucophaeus pipixcan (B)
- Short-billed gull, Larus brachyrhynchus (B)
- Ring-billed gull, Larus delawarensis (B)
- Western gull, Larus occidentalis (A)
- California gull, Larus californicus (B)
- Herring gull, Larus argentatus (B)
- Iceland gull, Larus glaucoides
- Lesser black-backed gull, Larus fuscus (A)
- Slaty-backed gull, Larus schistisagus (A)
- Glaucous-winged gull, Larus glaucescens (A)
- Glaucous gull, Larus hyperboreus
- Great black-backed gull, Larus marinus (A)
- Least tern, Sternula antillarum (A)
- Caspian tern, Hydroprogne caspia (B)
- Black tern, Chlidonias niger (B)
- Common tern, Sterna hirundo (B)
- Arctic tern, Sterna paradisaea (B)
- Forster's tern, Sterna forsteri (B)

== Loons ==
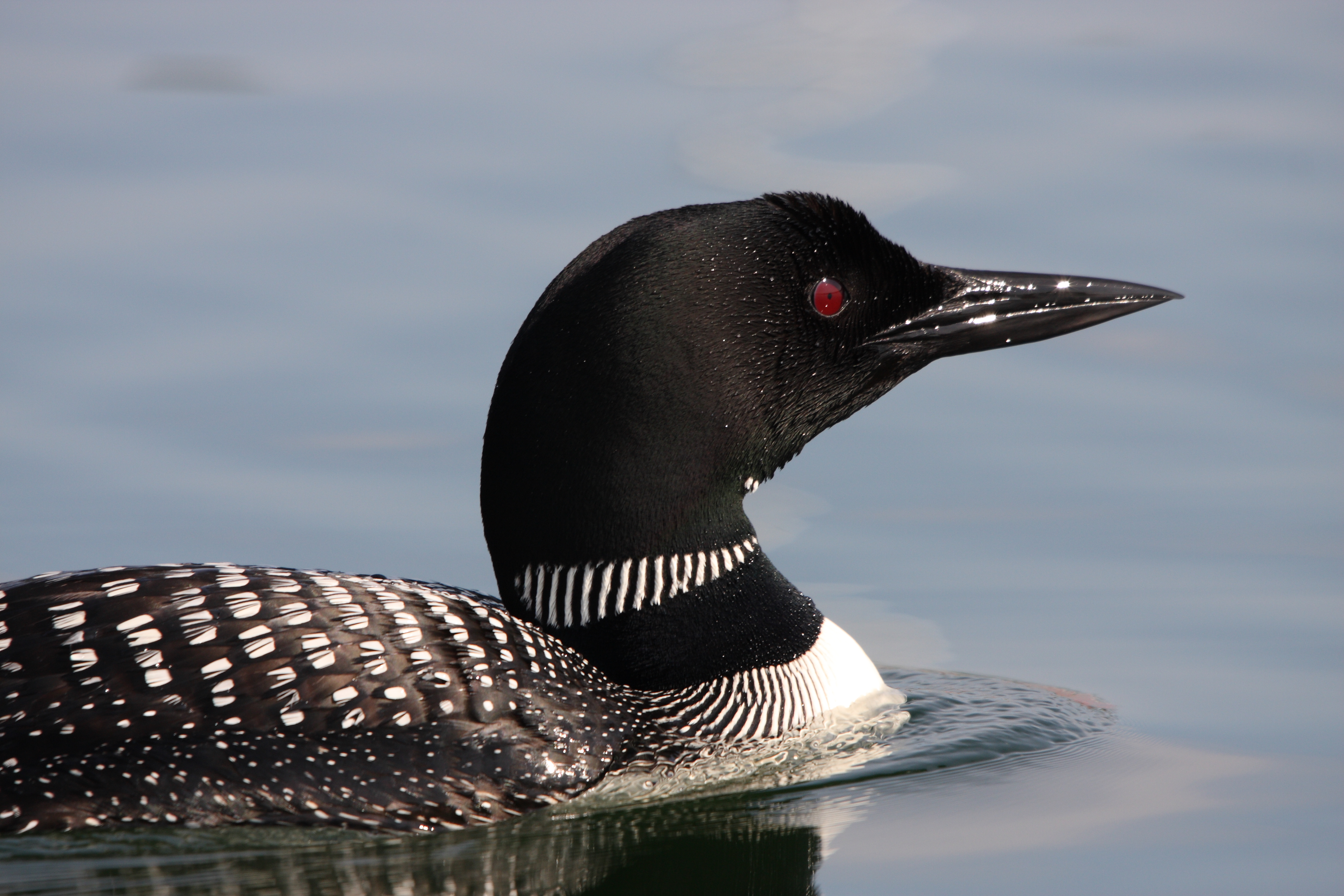
Common loon

Order: Gaviiformes Family: Gaviidae

Loons are aquatic birds, the size of a large duck, to which they are unrelated. Their plumage is largely grey or black, and they have spear-shaped bills. Loons swim well and fly adequately, but are almost hopeless on land, because their legs are placed towards the rear of the body.

- Red-throated loon, Gavia stellata (B)
- Pacific loon, Gavia pacifica (B)
- Common loon, Gavia immer (B)
- Yellow-billed loon, Gavia adamsii (A)

== Cormorants and shags ==
Order: Suliformes Family: Phalacrocoracidae

Cormorants are medium-to-large aquatic birds, usually with mainly dark plumage and areas of coloured skin on the face. The bill is long, thin, and sharply hooked. Their feet are four-toed and webbed.

- Double-crested cormorant, Nannopterum auritum (B)

== Pelicans ==
Order: Pelecaniformes Family: Pelecanidae

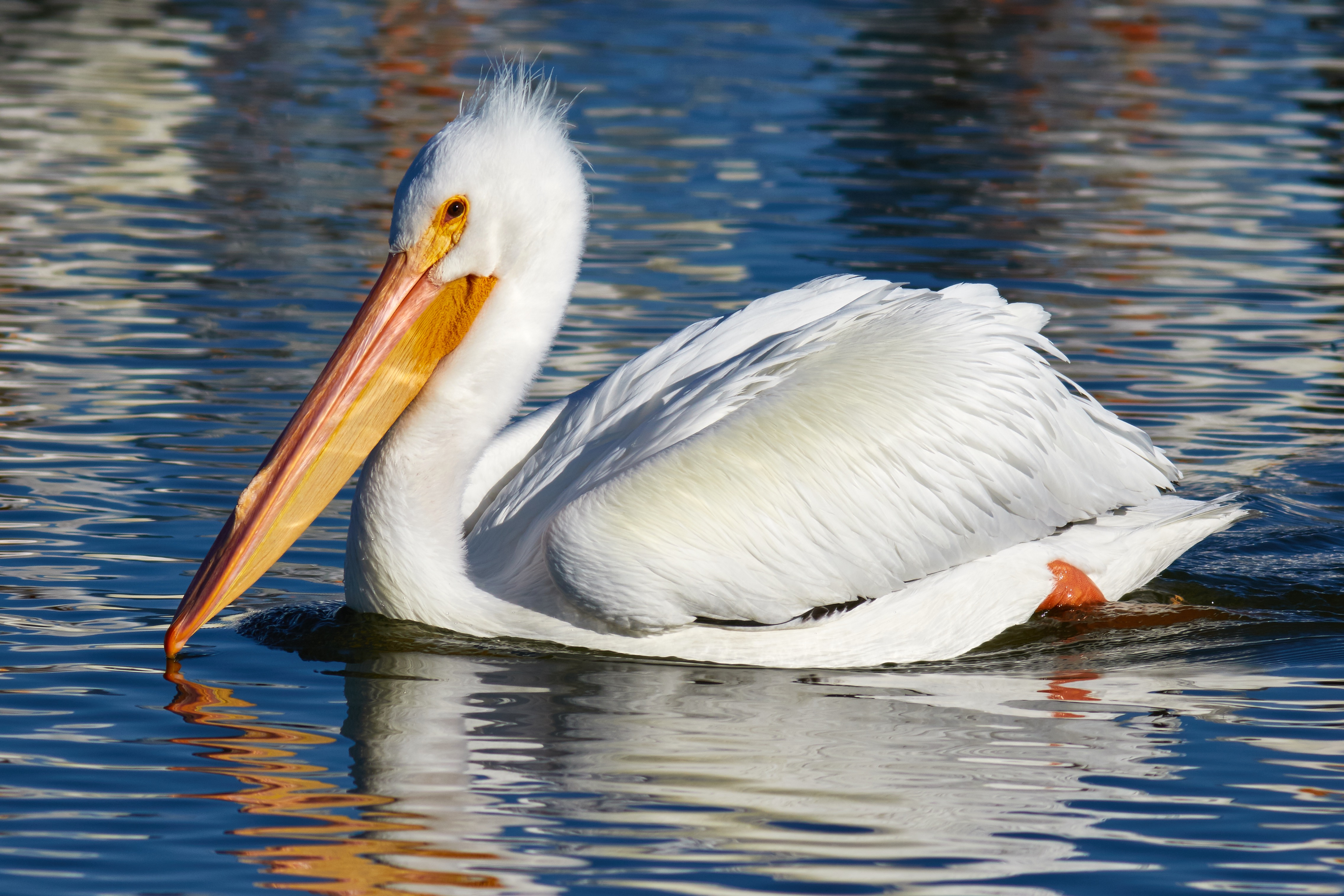
American white pelican

Pelicans are very large water birds with a distinctive pouch under their beak. Like other birds in the order Pelecaniformes, they have four webbed toes.

- American white pelican, Pelecanus erythrorhynchos (B)

== Herons, egrets, and bitterns ==
Order: Pelecaniformes Family: Ardeidae

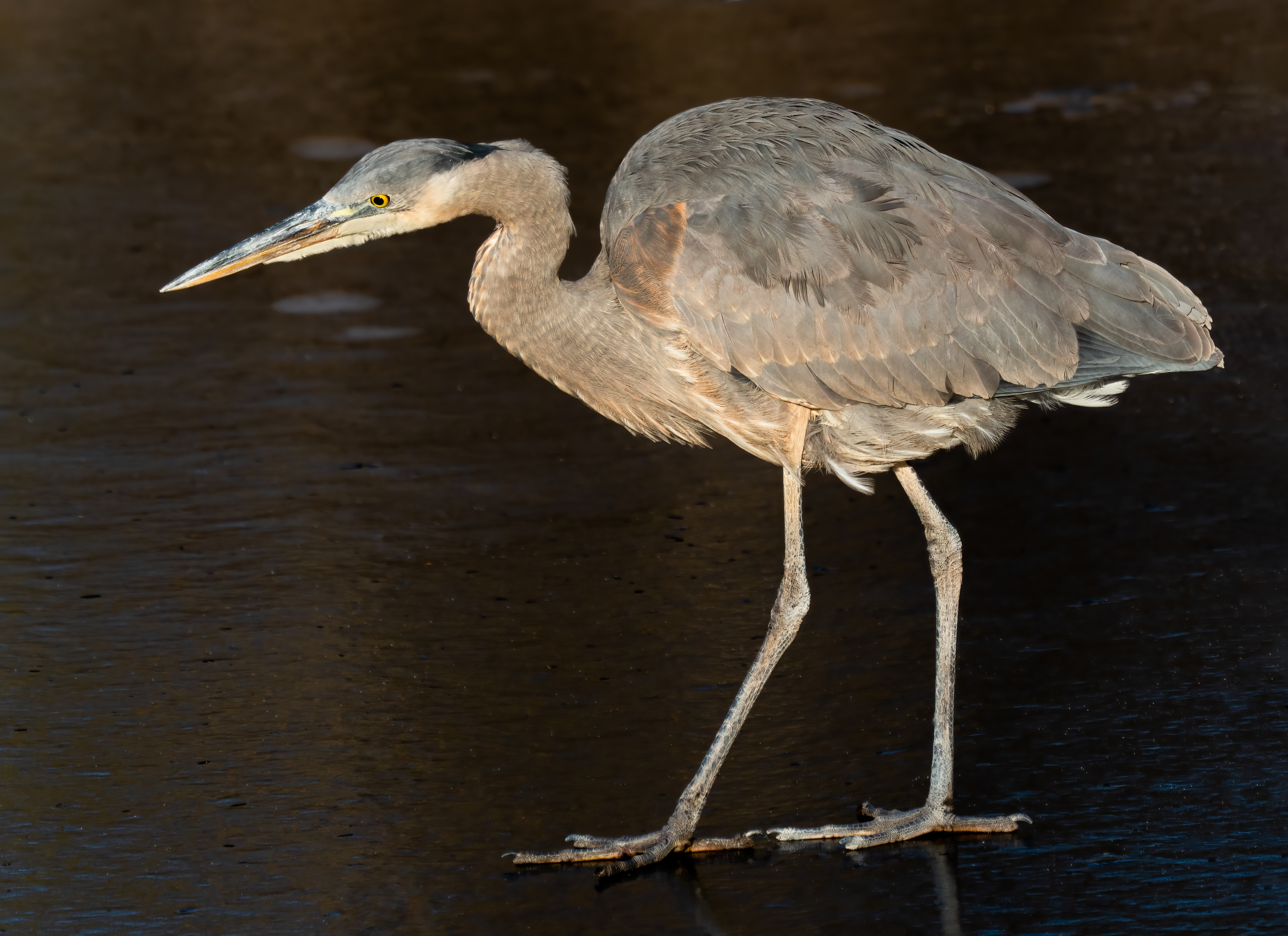
Great blue heron

The family Ardeidae contains the herons, egrets, and bitterns. Herons and egrets are medium to large wading birds with long necks and legs. Bitterns tend to be shorter necked and more secretive. Members of Ardeidae fly with their necks retracted, unlike other long-necked birds such as storks, ibises, and spoonbills.

- American bittern, Botaurus lentiginosus (B)
- Great blue heron, Ardea herodias (B)
- Great egret, Ardea alba (A) (B)
- Snowy egret, Egretta thula (A)
- Little blue heron, Egretta caerulea (A)
- Tricolored heron, Egretta tricolor (A)
- Cattle egret, Bubulcus ibis (A)
- Green heron, Butorides virescens (A)
- Black-crowned night heron, Nycticorax nycticorax (B)
- Yellow-crowned night heron, Nyctanassa violacea (A)

== Ibises and spoonbills ==
Order: Pelecaniformes Family: Threskiornithidae

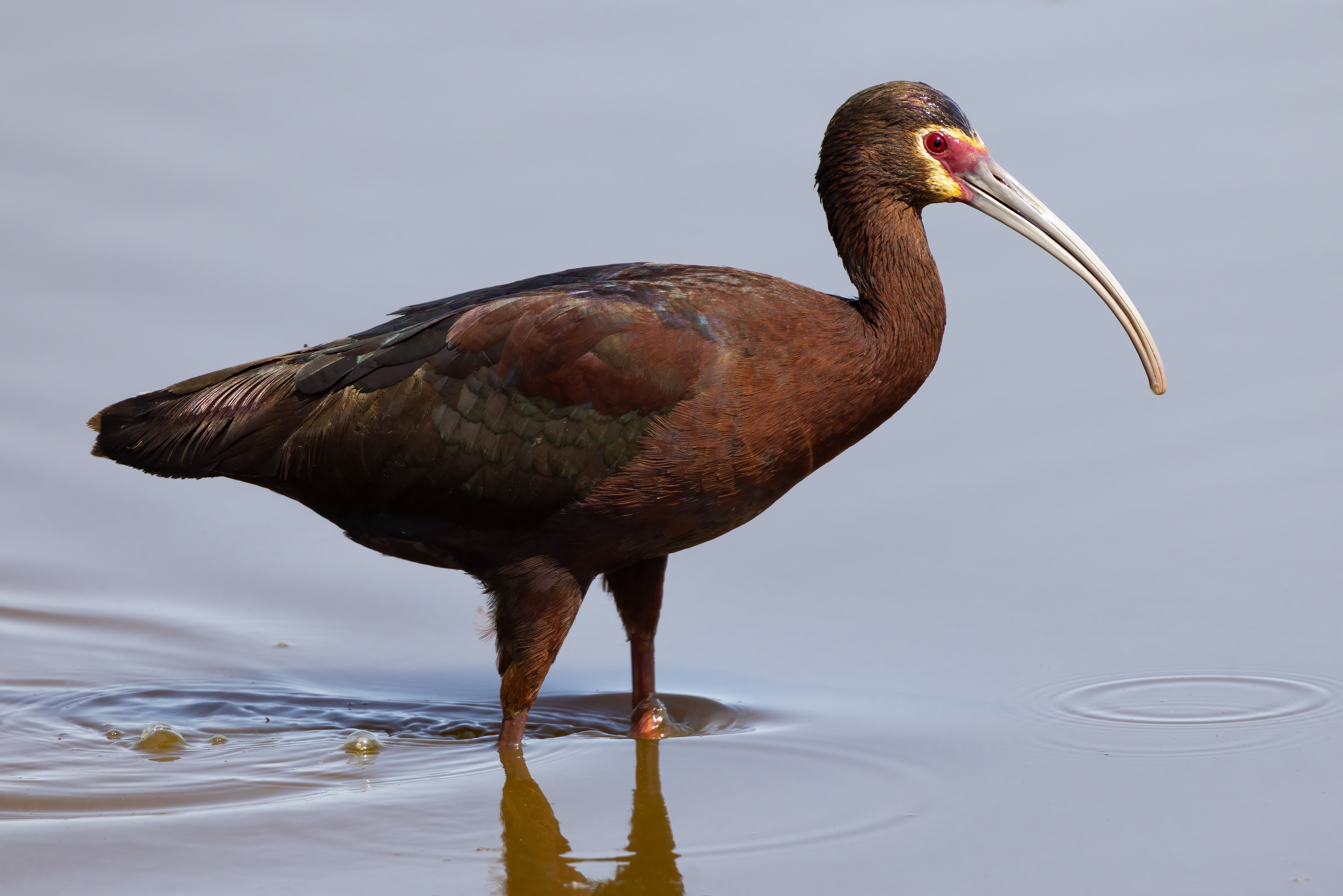
White-faced ibis

The family Threskiornithidae includes the ibises and spoonbills. They have long, broad wings. Their bodies tend to be elongated, the neck more so, with rather long legs. The bill is also long, decurved in the case of the ibises, straight and distinctively flattened in the spoonbills.

- Glossy ibis, Plegadis falcinellus (A)
- White-faced ibis, Plegadis chihi (B)

== New World vultures ==
Order: Accipitriformes Family: Cathartidae

The New World vultures are not closely related to Old World vultures, but superficially resemble them because of convergent evolution. Like the Old World vultures, they are scavengers. However, unlike Old World vultures, which find carcasses by sight, New World vultures have a good sense of smell with which they locate carcasses.

- Black vulture, Coragyps atratus (A)
- Turkey vulture, Cathartes aura (B)

== Osprey ==
Order: Accipitriformes Family: Pandionidae

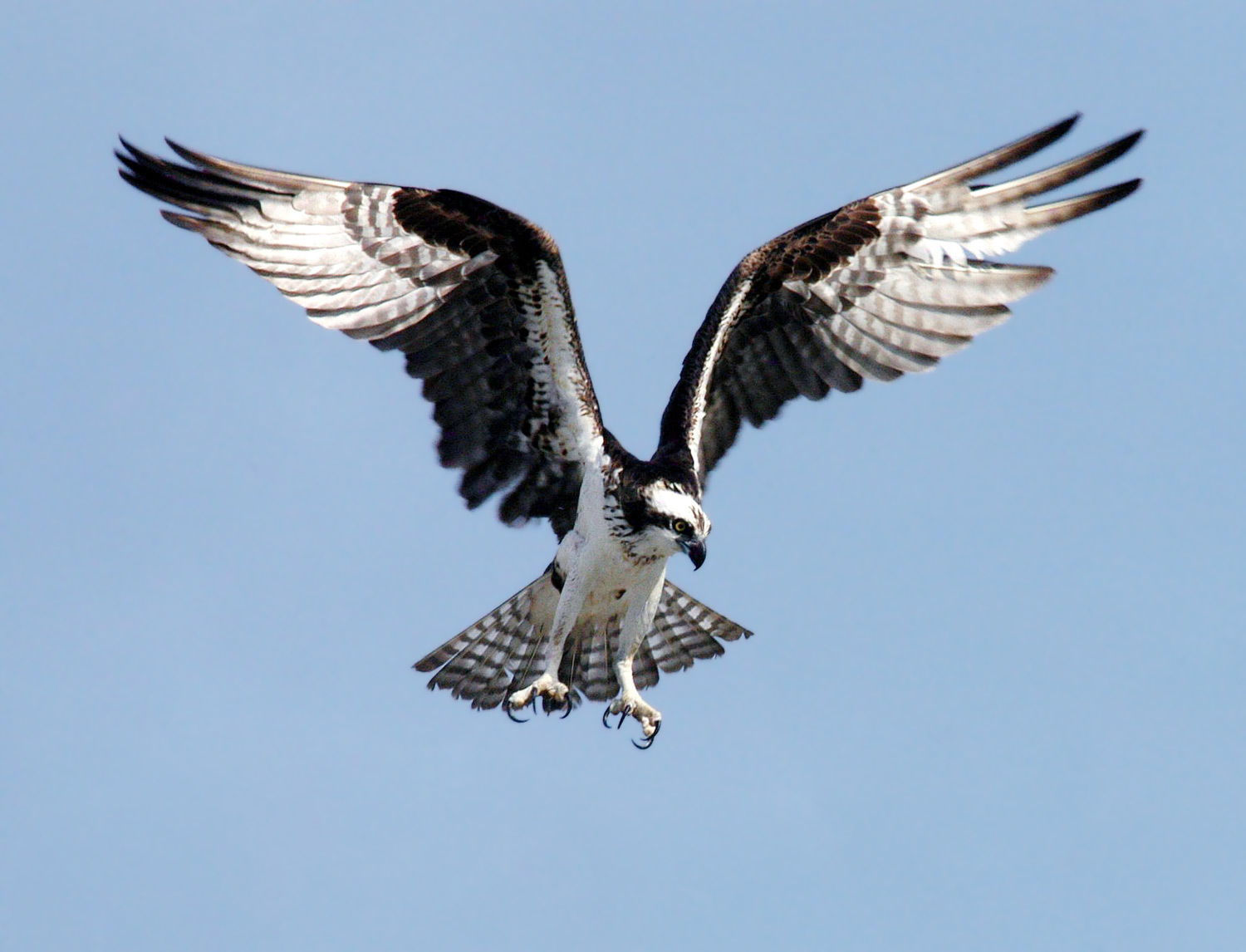
Osprey

Pandionidae is a family of fish-eating birds of prey possessing a very large, powerful hooked beak for tearing flesh from their prey, strong legs, powerful talons, and keen eyesight. The family is monotypic.

- Osprey, Pandion haliaetus (B)

== Hawks, eagles, and kites ==
Order: Accipitriformes Family: Accipitridae

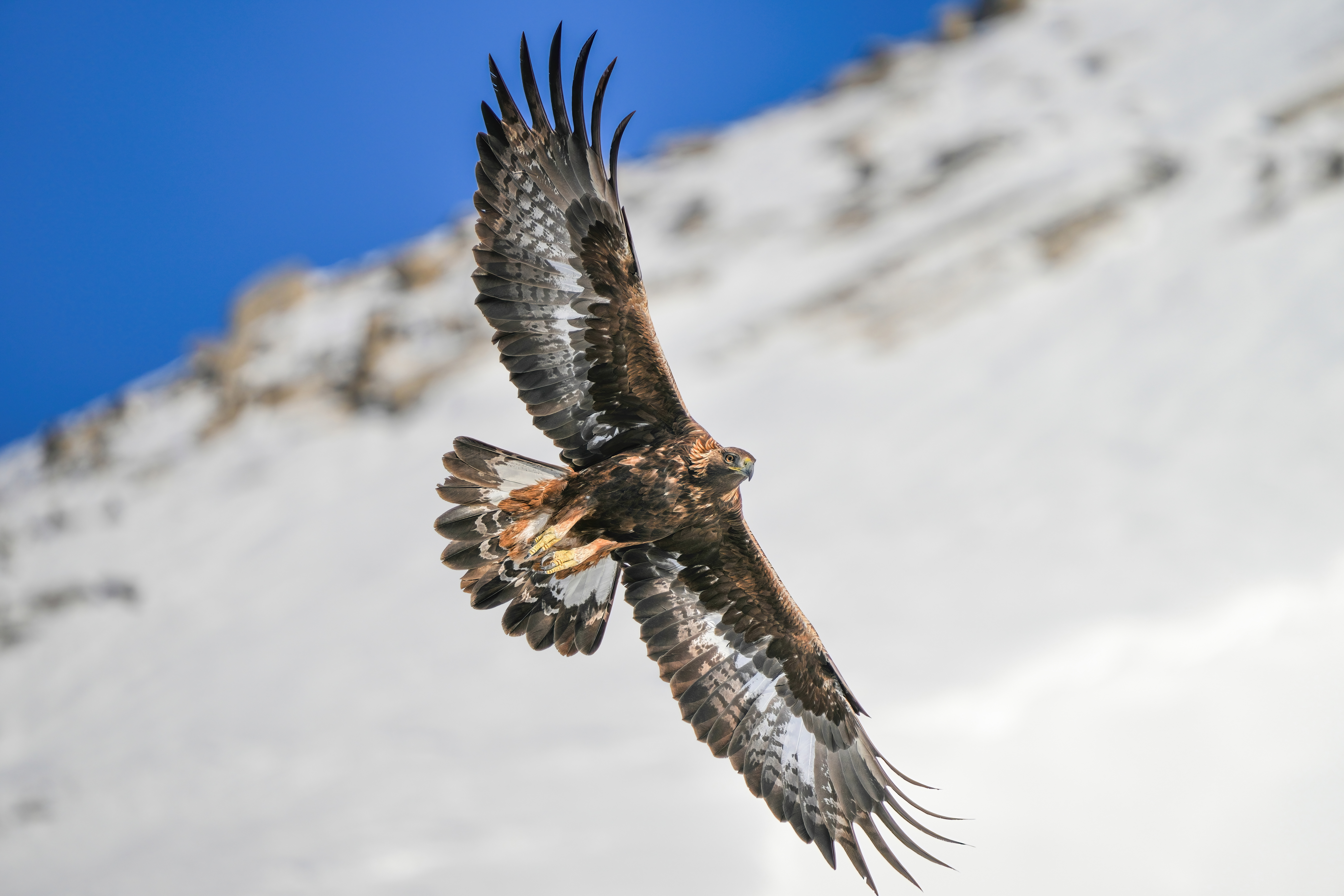
Golden eagle in flight

Accipitridae is a family of birds of prey which includes hawks, eagles, kites, harriers, and Old World vultures. These birds have very large powerful hooked beaks for tearing flesh from their prey, strong legs, powerful talons, and keen eyesight.

- Golden eagle, Aquila chrysaetos (B)
- Northern harrier, Circus hudsonius (B)
- Sharp-shinned hawk, Accipiter striatus (B)
- Cooper's hawk, Accipiter cooperii (B)
- American goshawk, Accipiter atricapillus (B)
- Bald eagle, Haliaeetus leucocephalus (B)
- Broad-winged hawk, Buteo platypterus (B)
- Swainson's hawk, Buteo swainsoni (B)
- Red-tailed hawk, Buteo jamaicensis (B)
- Rough-legged hawk, Buteo lagopus
- Ferruginous hawk, Buteo regalis (B)

== Barn-owls ==
Order: Strigiformes Family: Tytonidae

Owls in the family Tytonidae are medium to large owls with large heads and characteristic heart-shaped faces.

- Barn owl, Tyto furcata (A)

== Owls ==
Order: Strigiformes Family: Strigidae

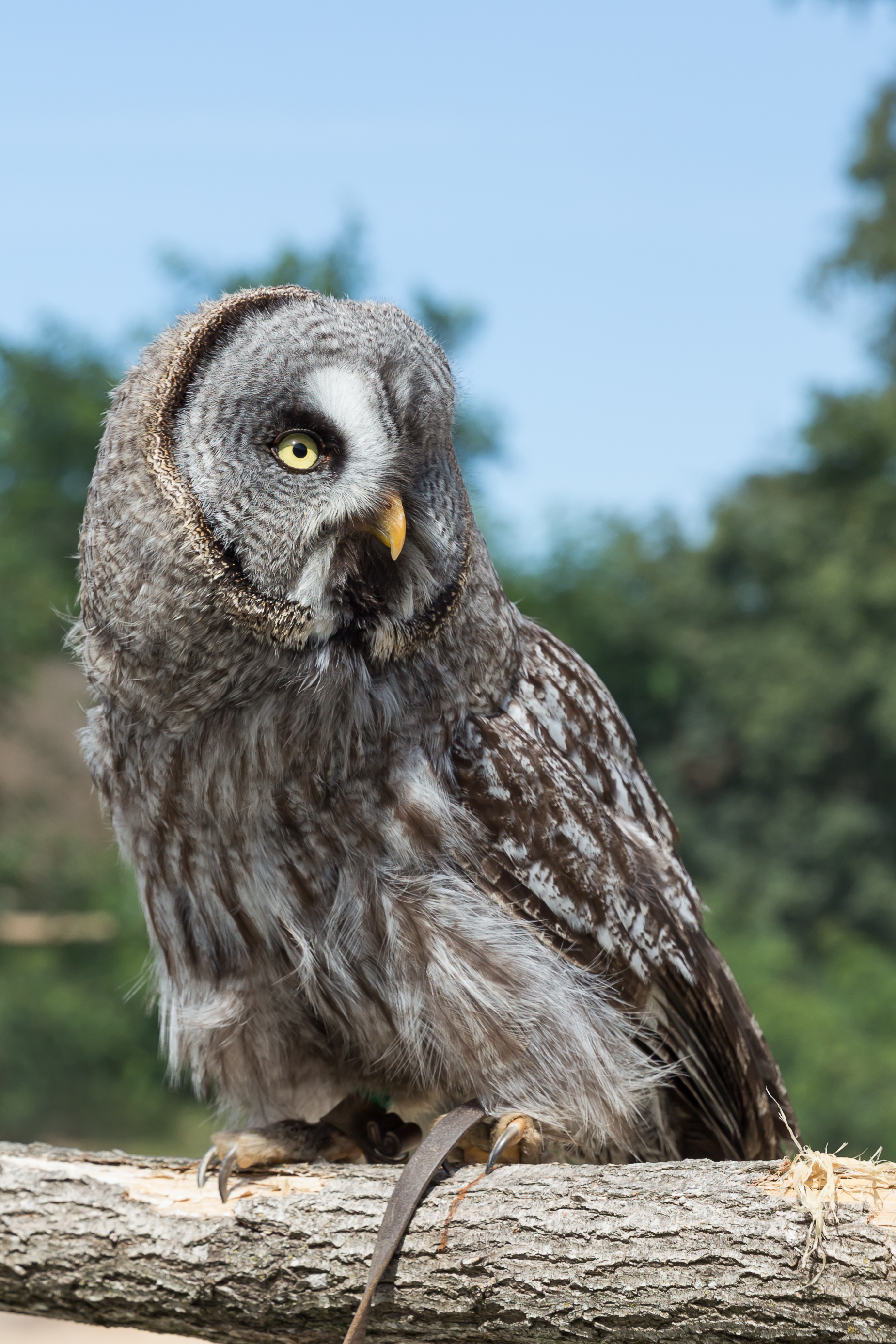
Great grey owl

Typical owls are small to large solitary nocturnal birds of prey. They have large forward-facing eyes and ears, a hawk-like beak, and a conspicuous circle of feathers around each eye called a facial disk.

- Flammulated owl, Psiloscops flammeolus (A)
- Western screech-owl, Megascops kennicottii (A)
- Eastern screech-owl, Megascops asio (A)
- Great horned owl, Bubo virginianus (B)
- Snowy owl, Bubo scandiacus
- Northern hawk owl, Surnia ulula (B)
- Northern pygmy-owl, Glaucidium gnoma (B)
- Burrowing owl, Athene cunicularia (B)
- Barred owl, Strix varia (B)
- Great grey owl, Strix nebulosa (B)
- Long-eared owl, Asio otus (B)
- Short-eared owl, Asio flammeus (B)
- Boreal owl, Aegolius funereus (B)
- Northern saw-whet owl, Aegolius acadicus (B)

== Kingfishers ==
Order: Coraciiformes Family: Alcedinidae

Kingfishers are medium-sized birds with large heads, long, pointed bills, short legs, and stubby tails.

- Belted kingfisher, Megaceryle alcyon (B)

== Woodpeckers ==
Order: Piciformes Family: Picidae

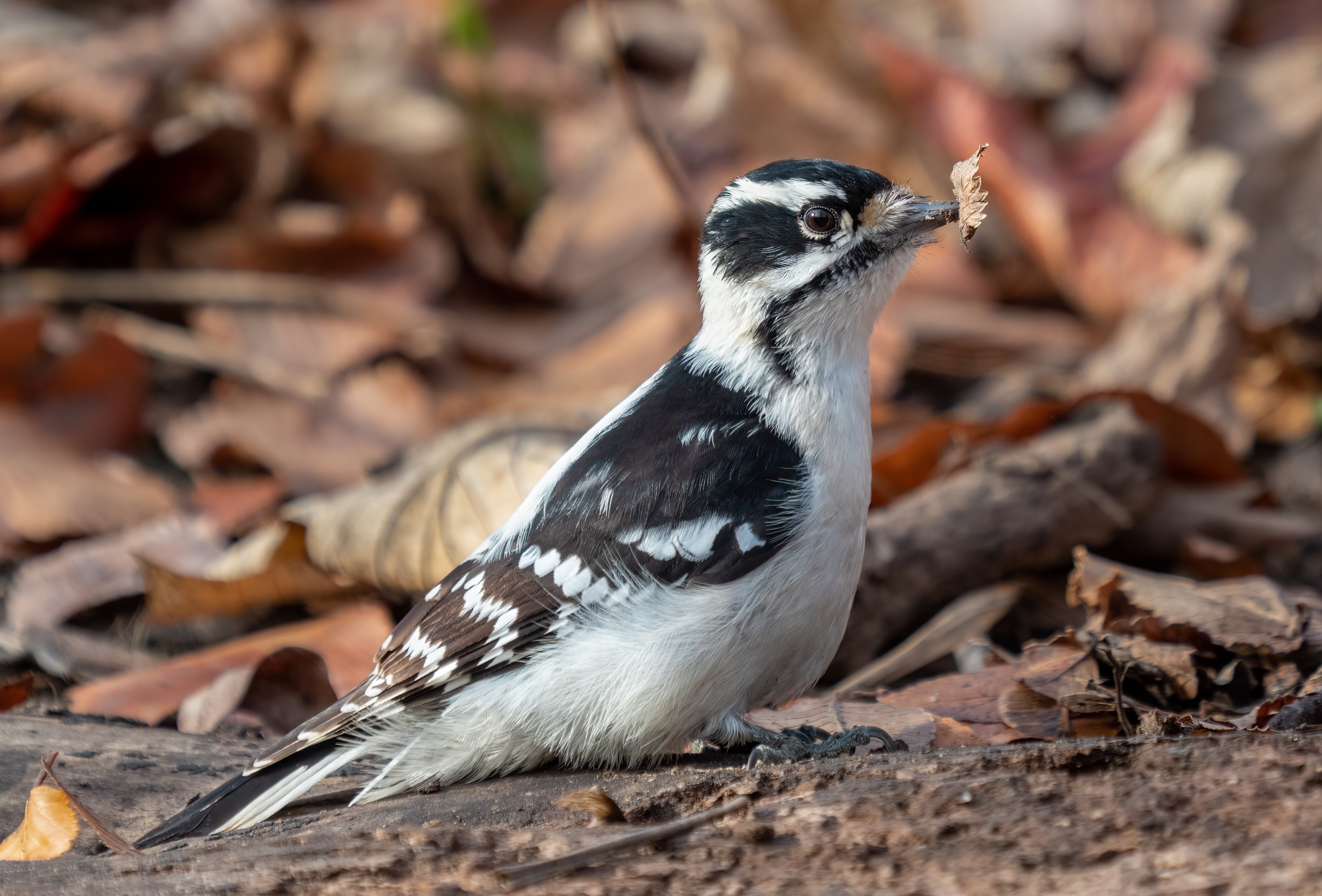
Downy woodpecker

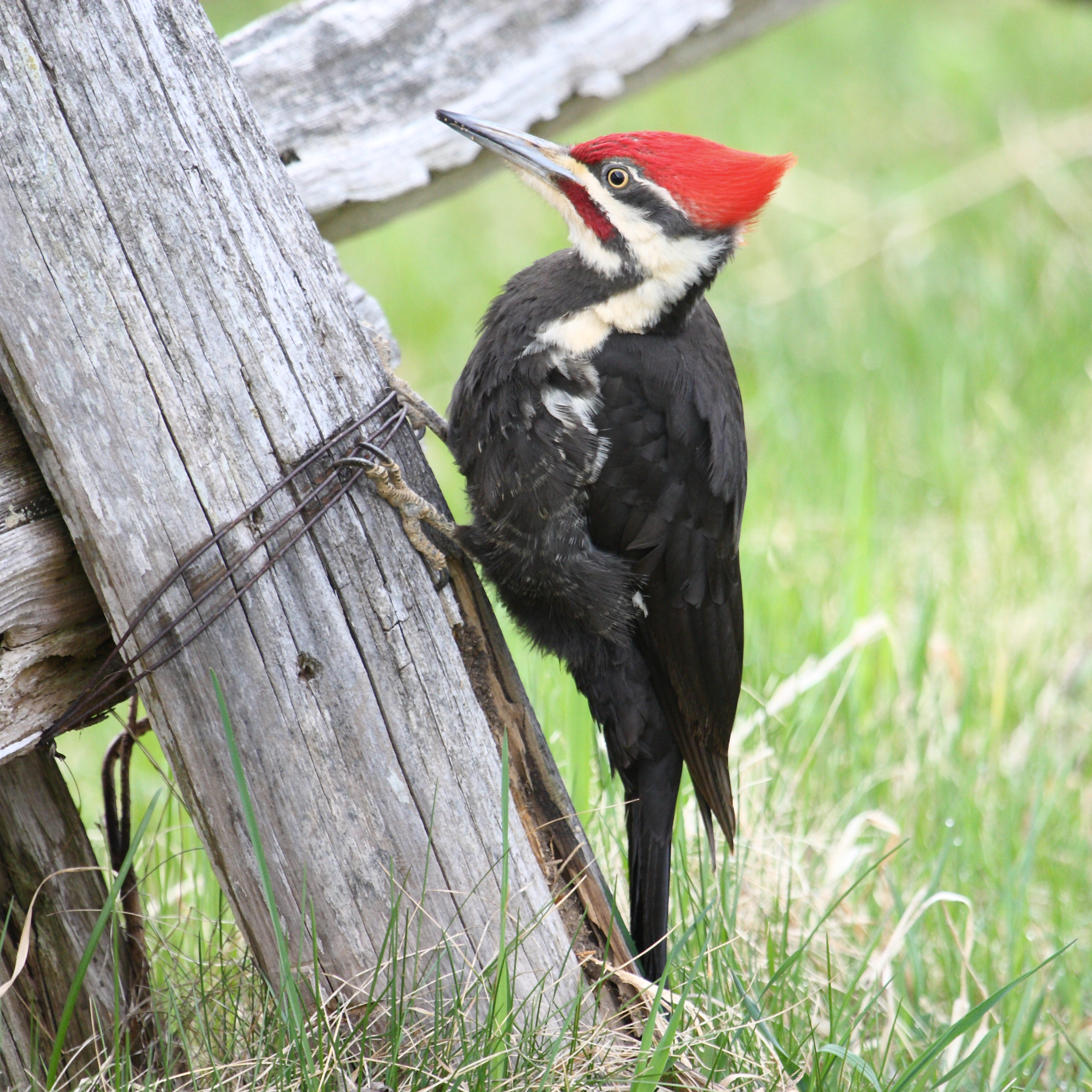
Pileated woodpecker

Woodpeckers are small to medium-sized birds with chisel-like beaks, short legs, stiff tails, and long tongues used for capturing insects. Some species have feet with two toes pointing forward and two backward, while several species have only three toes. Many woodpeckers have the habit of tapping noisily on tree trunks with their beaks.

- Lewis's woodpecker, Melanerpes lewis (A) (B)
- Red-headed woodpecker, Melanerpes erythrocephalus (A) (Possibly breeding)
- Acorn woodpecker, Melanerpes formicivorus (A)
- Red-bellied woodpecker, Melanerpes carolinus (A)
- Williamson's sapsucker, Sphyrapicus thyroideus (A)
- Yellow-bellied sapsucker, Sphyrapicus varius (B)
- Red-naped sapsucker, Sphyrapicus nuchalis (B)
- Red-breasted sapsucker, Sphyrapicus ruber (A)
- American three-toed woodpecker, Picoides dorsalis (B)
- Black-backed woodpecker, Picoides arcticus (B)
- Downy woodpecker, Dryobates pubescens (B)
- Hairy woodpecker, Dryobates villosus (B)
- Northern flicker, Colaptes auratus (B)
- Pileated woodpecker, Dryocopus pileatus (B)

== Falcons and caracaras ==
Order: Falconiformes Family: Falconidae

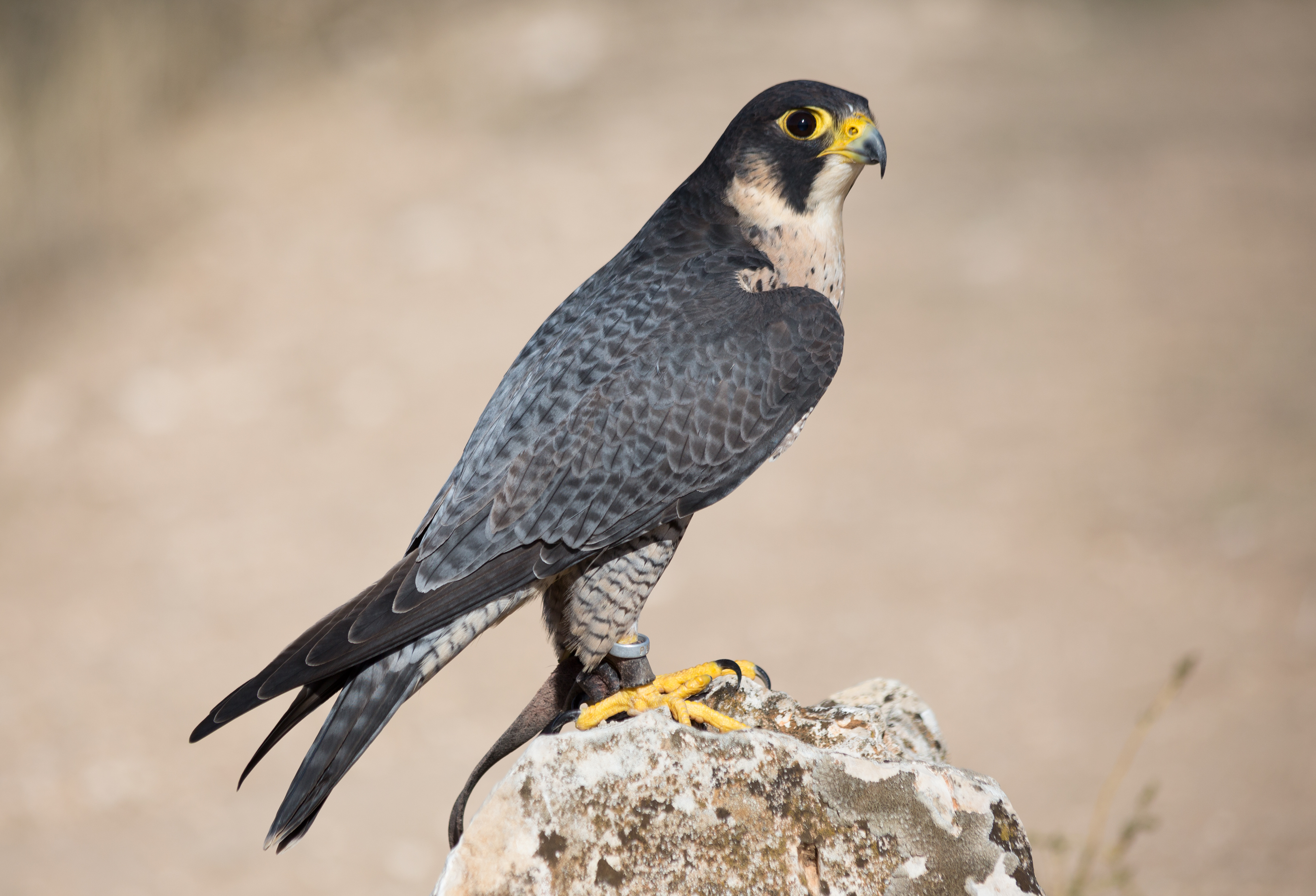
Peregrine falcon

Falconidae is a family of diurnal birds of prey, notably the falcons and caracaras. They differ from hawks, eagles, and kites in that they kill with their beaks instead of their talons.

- Crested caracara, Caracara plancus (A)
- American kestrel, Falco sparverius (B)
- Merlin, Falco columbarius (B)
- Gyrfalcon, Falco rusticolus
- Peregrine falcon, Falco peregrinus (B)
- Prairie falcon, Falco mexicanus (B)

== Tyrant flycatchers ==
Order: Passeriformes Family: Tyrannidae

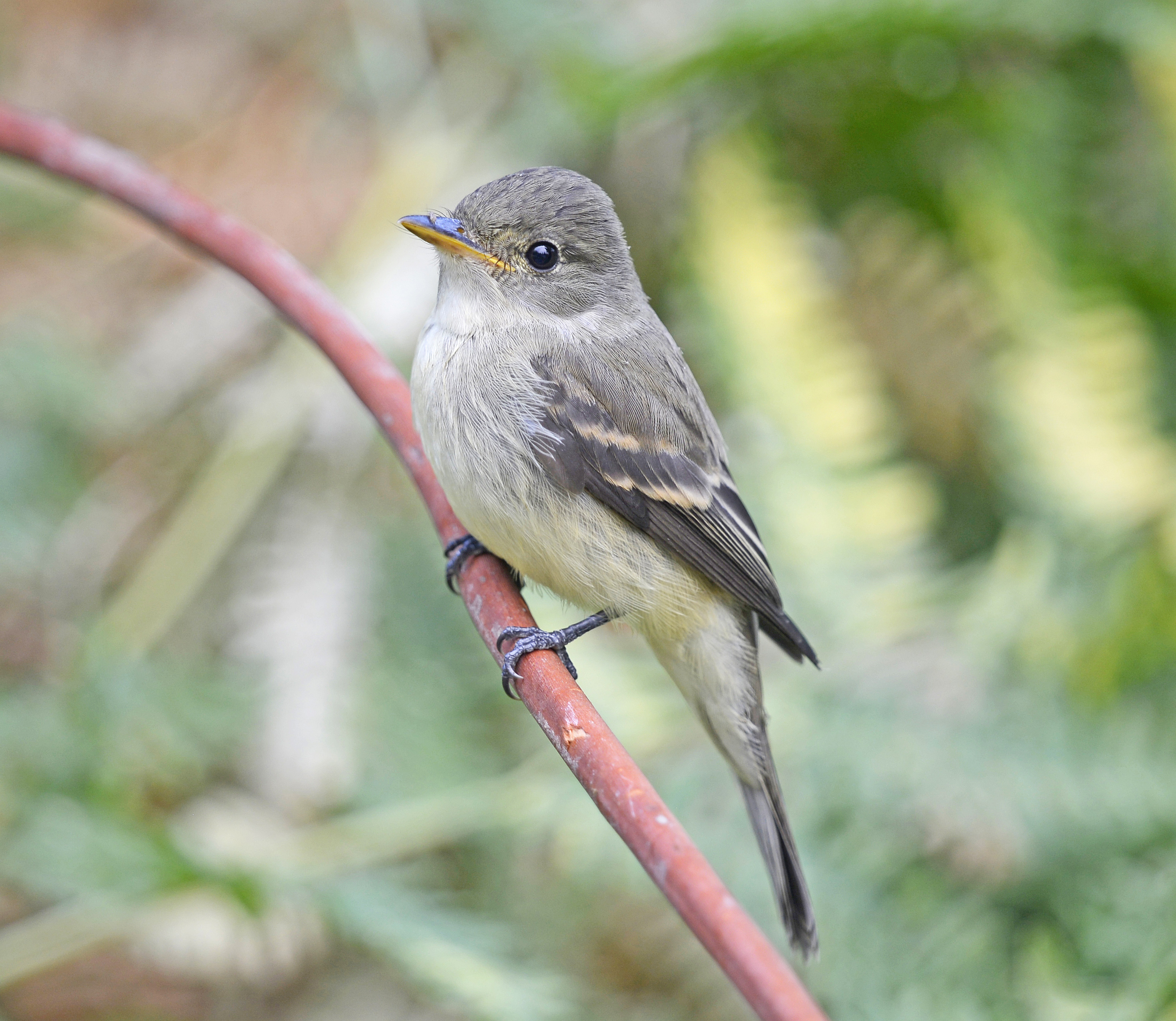
Willow flycatcher

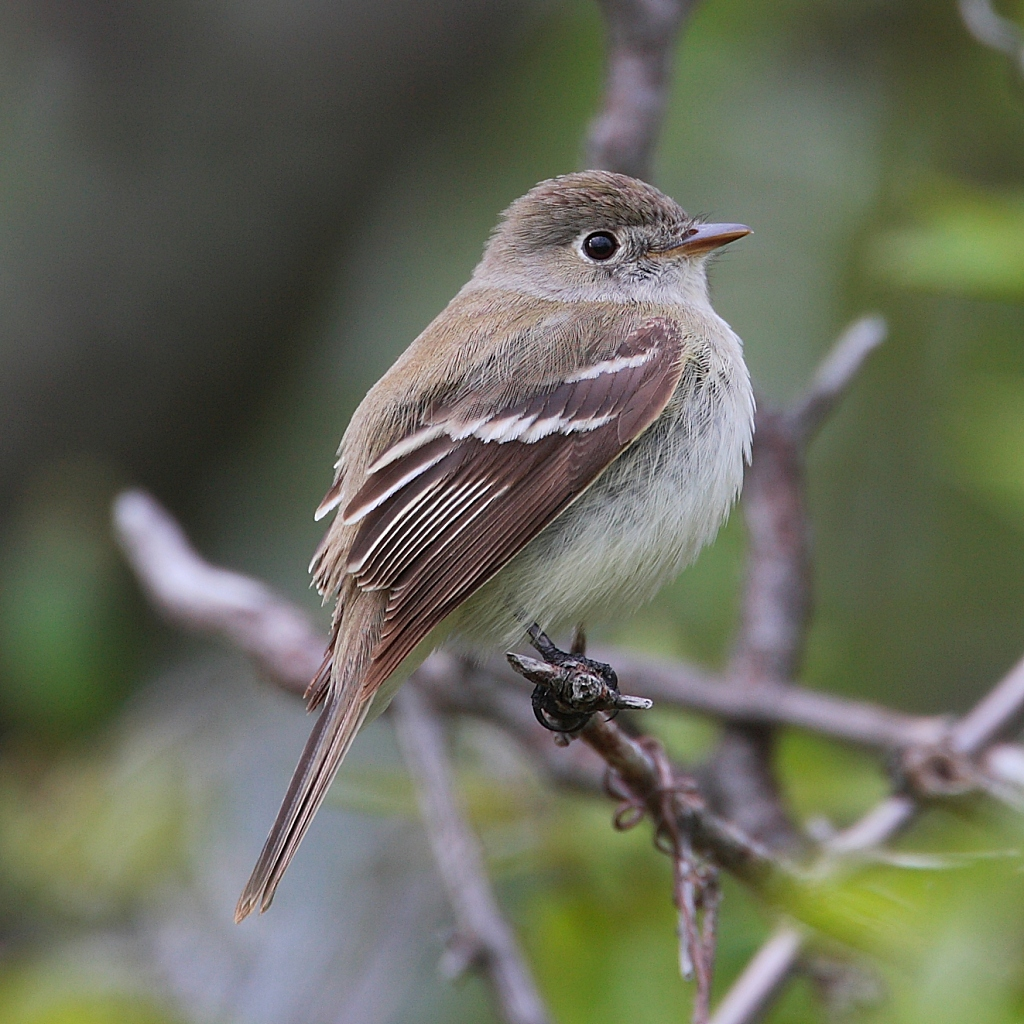
Least flycatcher

Tyrant flycatchers are passerine birds which occur throughout North and South America. They superficially resemble the Old World flycatchers, but are more robust and have stronger bills. They do not have the sophisticated vocal capabilities of the songbirds. Most, but not all, are rather plain. As the name implies, most are insectivorous.

- Ash-throated flycatcher, Myiarchus cinerascens (A)
- Great crested flycatcher, Myiarchus crinitus (B)
- Western kingbird, Tyrannus verticalis (B)
- Eastern kingbird, Tyrannus tyrannus (B)
- Scissor-tailed flycatcher, Tyrannus forficatus (A)
- Fork-tailed flycatcher, Tyrannus savana (A)
- Olive-sided flycatcher, Contopus cooperi (B)
- Western wood-pewee, Contopus sordidulus (B)
- Eastern wood-pewee, Contopus virens (A)
- Yellow-bellied flycatcher, Empidonax flaviventris (B)
- Alder flycatcher, Empidonax alnorum (B)
- Willow flycatcher, Empidonax traillii (B)
- Least flycatcher, Empidonax minimus (B)
- Hammond's flycatcher, Empidonax hammondii (B)
- Grey flycatcher, Empidonax wrightii (A)
- Dusky flycatcher, Empidonax oberholseri (B)
- Western flycatcher, Empidonax difficilis (B)
- Eastern phoebe, Sayornis phoebe (B)
- Say's phoebe, Sayornis saya (B)

== Vireos, shrike-babblers, and erpornis ==
Order: Passeriformes Family: Vireonidae

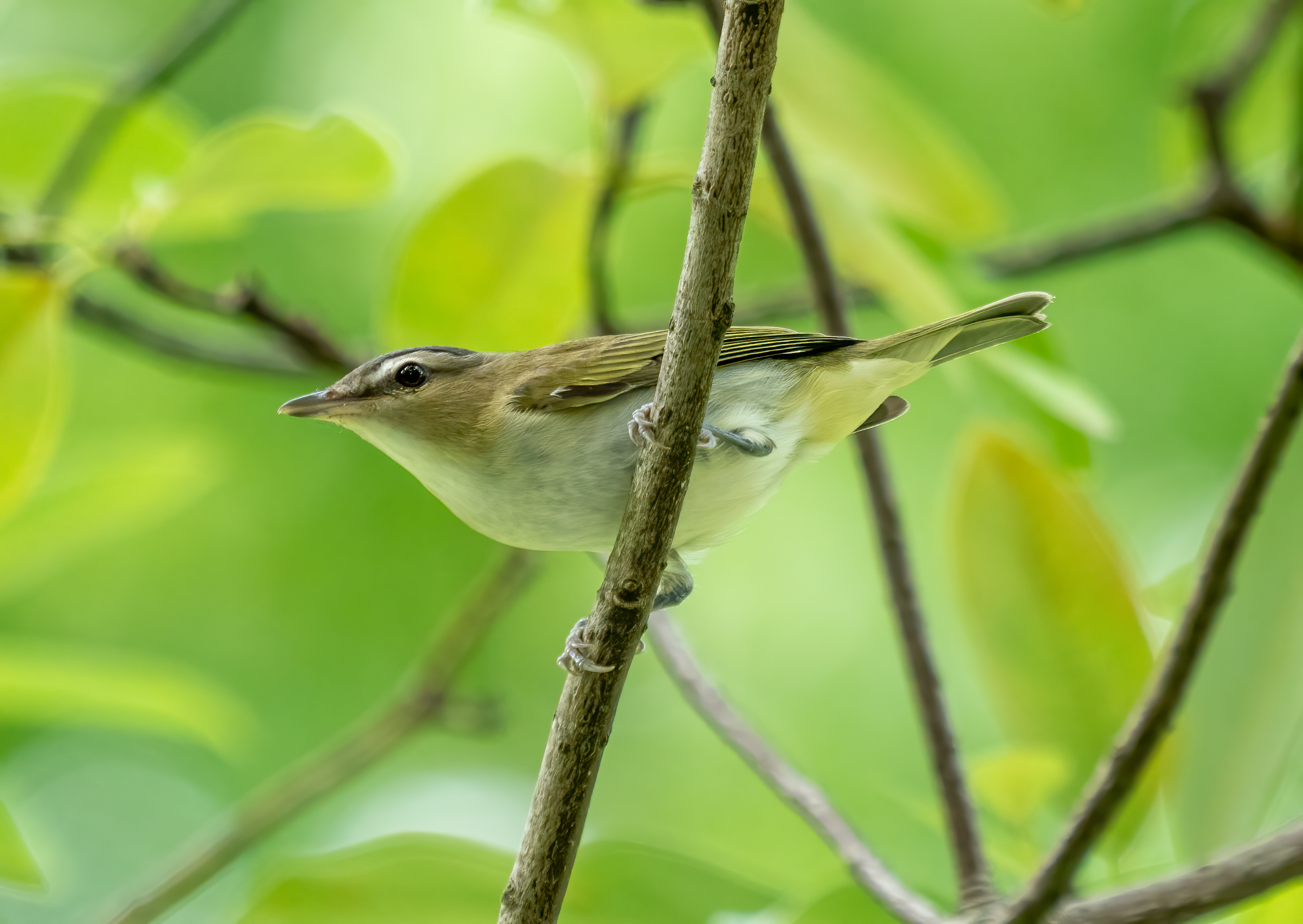
Red-eyed vireo

Vireos are a group of small to medium-sized passerine birds mostly restricted to the New World, though few other members of the family are found in Asia. They are typically greenish in colour and resemble wood warblers apart from their heavier bills.

- White-eyed vireo, Vireo griseus (A)
- Yellow-throated vireo, Vireo flavifrons (A)
- Cassin's vireo, Vireo cassinii (B)
- Blue-headed vireo, Vireo solitarius (B)
- Philadelphia vireo, Vireo philadelphicus (B)
- Warbling vireo, Vireo gilvus (B)
- Red-eyed vireo, Vireo olivaceus (B)

== Shrikes ==
Order: Passeriformes Family: Laniidae

Shrikes are passerine birds known for their habit of catching other birds and small animals and impaling the uneaten portions of their bodies on thorns. A shrike's beak is hooked, like that of a typical bird of prey.

- Loggerhead shrike, Lanius ludovicianus (B)
- Northern shrike, Lanius borealis (B)

== Crows, jays, and magpies ==
Order: Passeriformes Family: Corvidae

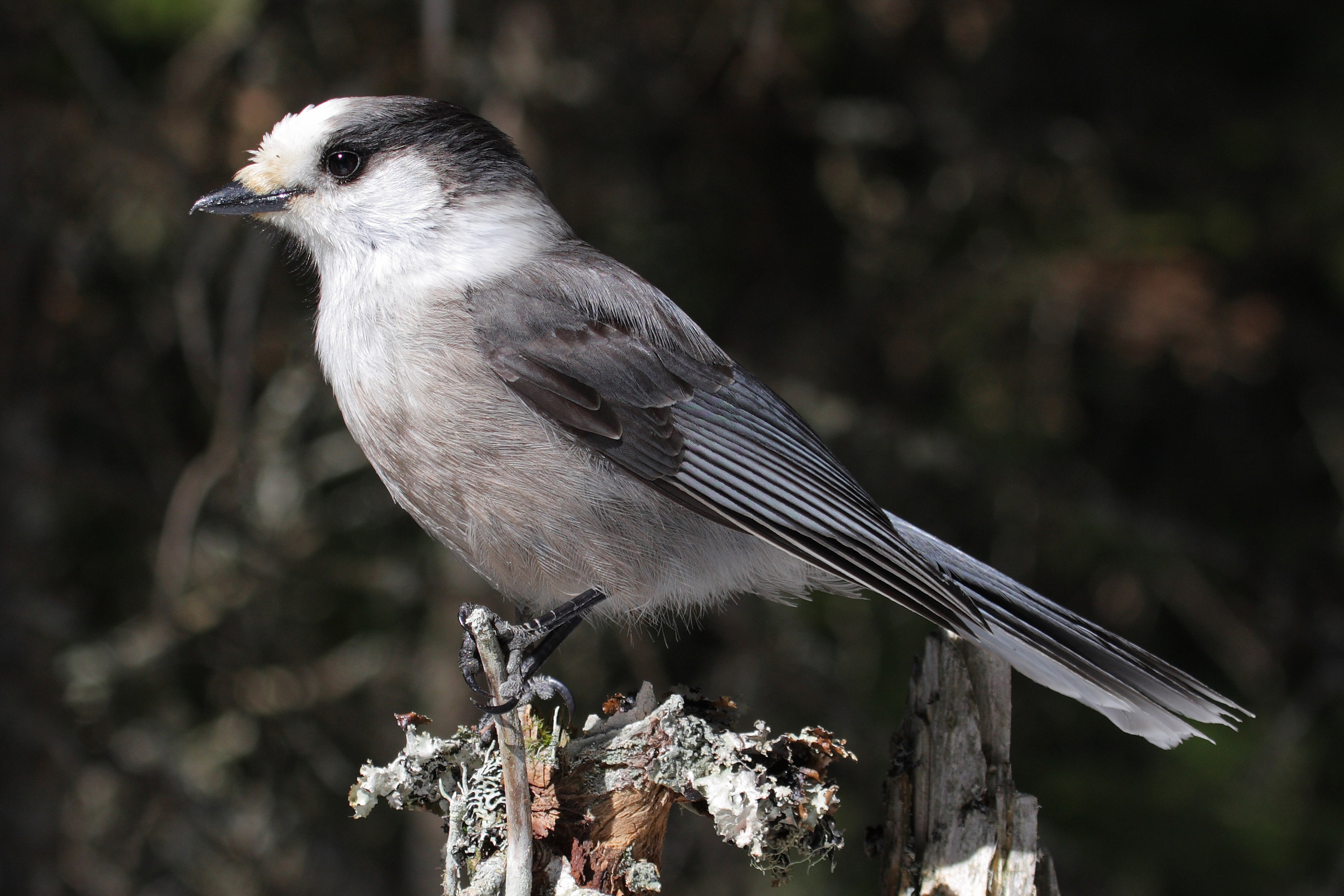
Canada jay

The family Corvidae includes crows, ravens, jays, choughs, magpies, treepies, nutcrackers, and ground jays. Corvids are above average in size among the Passeriformes, and some of the larger species show high levels of intelligence.

- Canada jay, Perisoreus canadensis (B)
- Pinyon jay, Gymnorhinus cyanocephalus (A)
- Steller's jay, Cyanocitta stelleri (B)
- Blue jay, Cyanocitta cristata (B)
- Clark's nutcracker, Nucifraga columbiana (B)
- Black-billed magpie, Pica hudsonia (B)
- American crow, Corvus brachyrhynchos (B)
- Common raven, Corvus corax (B)

== Tits, chickadees, and titmice ==
Order: Passeriformes Family: Paridae

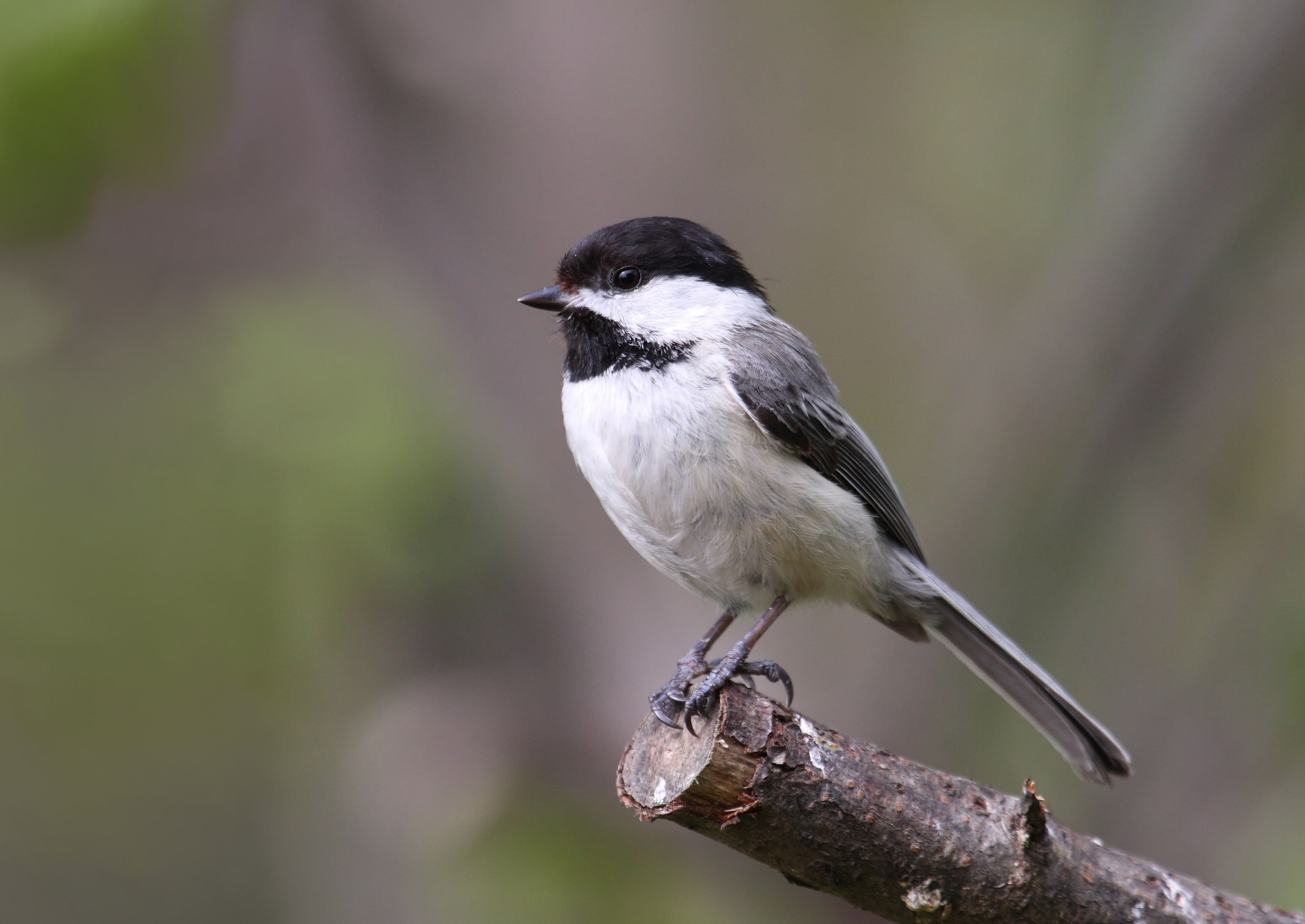
Black-capped chickadee

Paridae are mainly small stocky woodland species with short stout bills. Some have crests. They are adaptable birds, with a mixed diet including seeds and insects.

- Black-capped chickadee, Poecile atricapilla (B)
- Mountain chickadee, Poecile gambeli (B)
- Chestnut-backed chickadee, Poecile rufescens (A)
- Boreal chickadee, Poecile hudsonica (B)

== Larks ==
Order: Passeriformes Family: Alaudidae

Larks are small terrestrial birds with often extravagant songs and display flights. Most larks are fairly dull in appearance. Their food is insects and seeds.

- Horned lark, Eremophila alpestris (B)

== Swallows ==
Order: Passeriformes Family: Hirundinidae

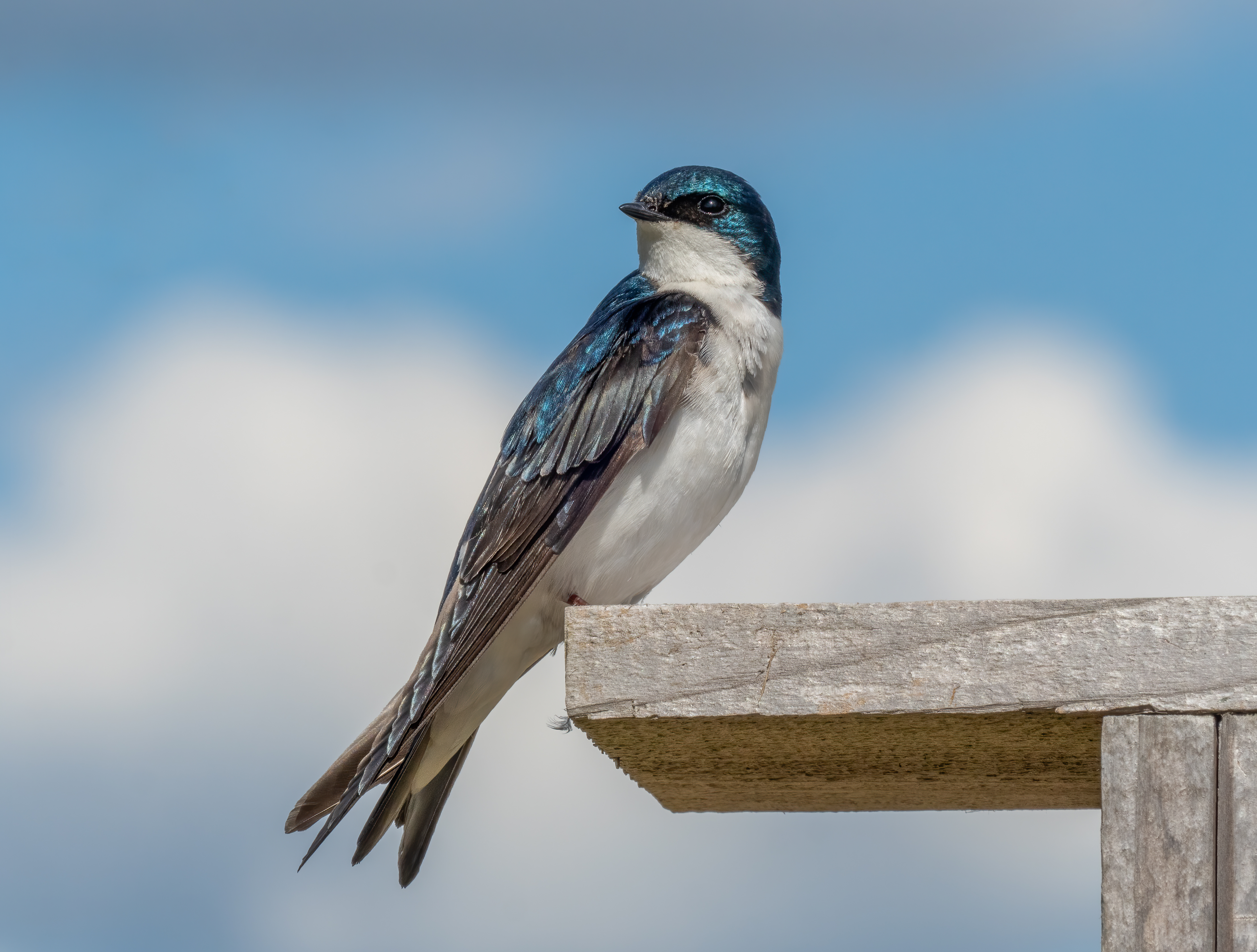
Tree swallow

The family Hirundinidae is adapted to aerial feeding. They have a slender streamlined body, long pointed wings, and a short bill with a wide gape. The feet are adapted to perching rather than walking, and the front toes are partially joined at the base.

- Bank swallow, Riparia riparia (B)
- Tree swallow, Tachycineta bicolor (B)
- Violet-green swallow, Tachycineta thalassina (B)
- Northern rough-winged swallow, Stelgidopteryx serripennis (B)
- Purple martin, Progne subis (B)
- Barn swallow, Hirundo rustica (B)
- Cliff swallow, Petrochelidon pyrrhonota (B)

== Kinglets ==
Order: Passeriformes Family: Regulidae

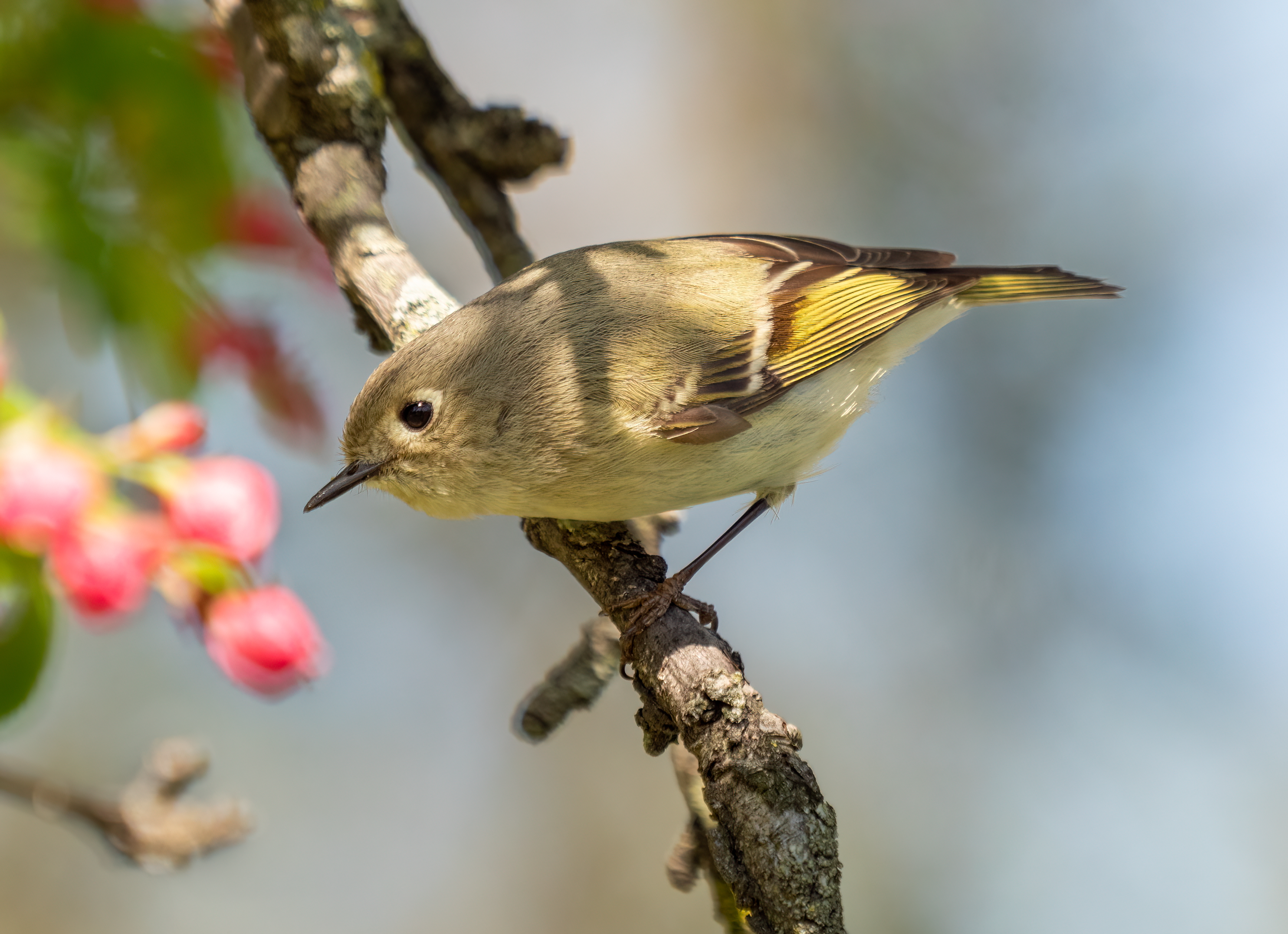
Ruby-crowned kinglet

Kinglets are a small family of birds which resemble the titmice. They are very small insectivorous birds. The adults have coloured crowns, giving rise to their name.

- Ruby-crowned kinglet, Corthylio calendula (B)
- Golden-crowned kinglet, Regulus satrapa (B)

== Waxwings ==
Order: Passeriformes Family: Bombycillidae

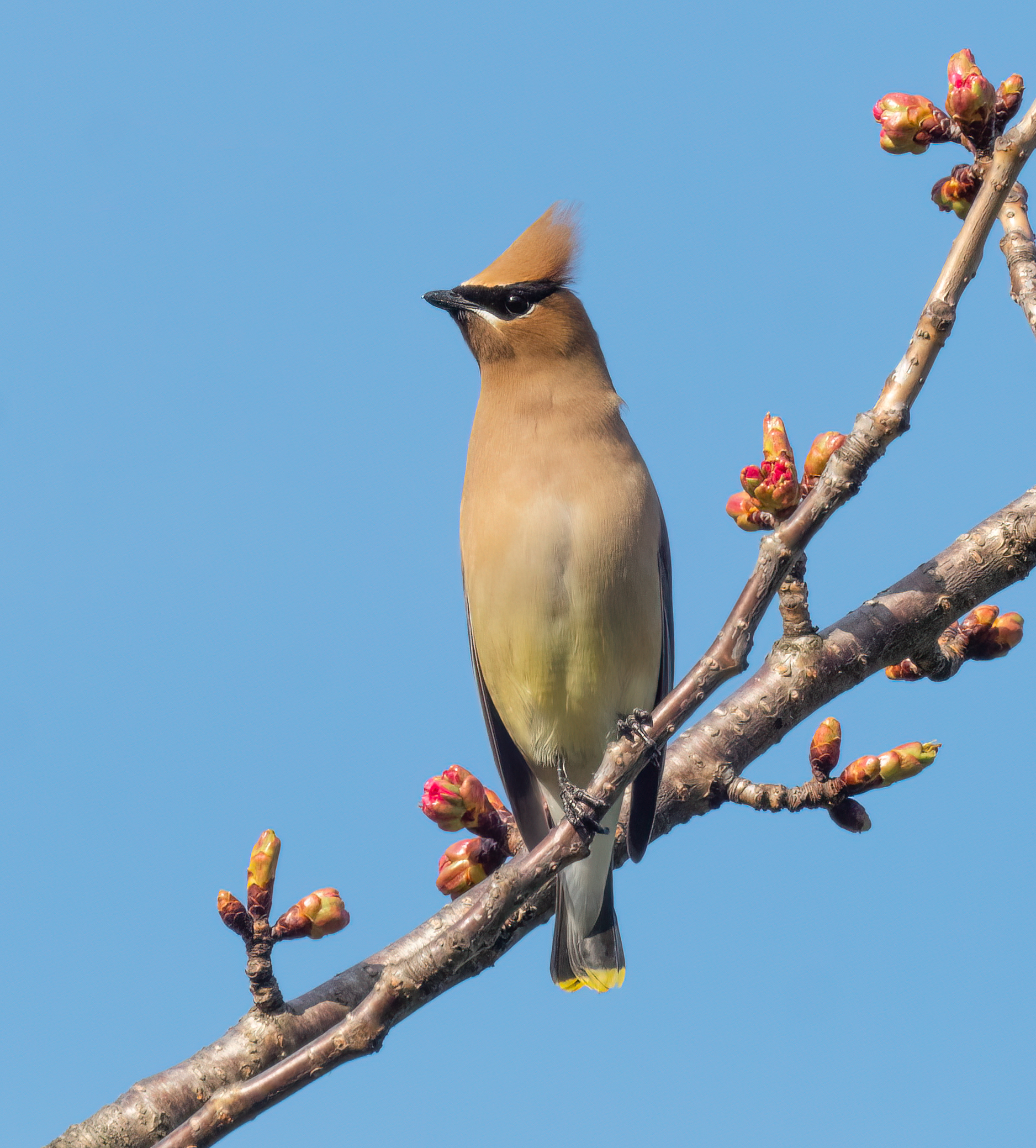
Cedar waxwing

Waxwings are a group of passerine birds with soft silky plumage and unique red tips to some of the wing feathers. In the Bohemian and cedar waxwings, these tips look like sealing wax and give the group its name. These are arboreal birds of northern forests. They live on insects in summer and berries in winter.

- Bohemian waxwing, Bombycilla garrulus (B)
- Cedar waxwing, Bombycilla cedrorum (B)

== Nuthatches ==
Order: Passeriformes Family: Sittidae

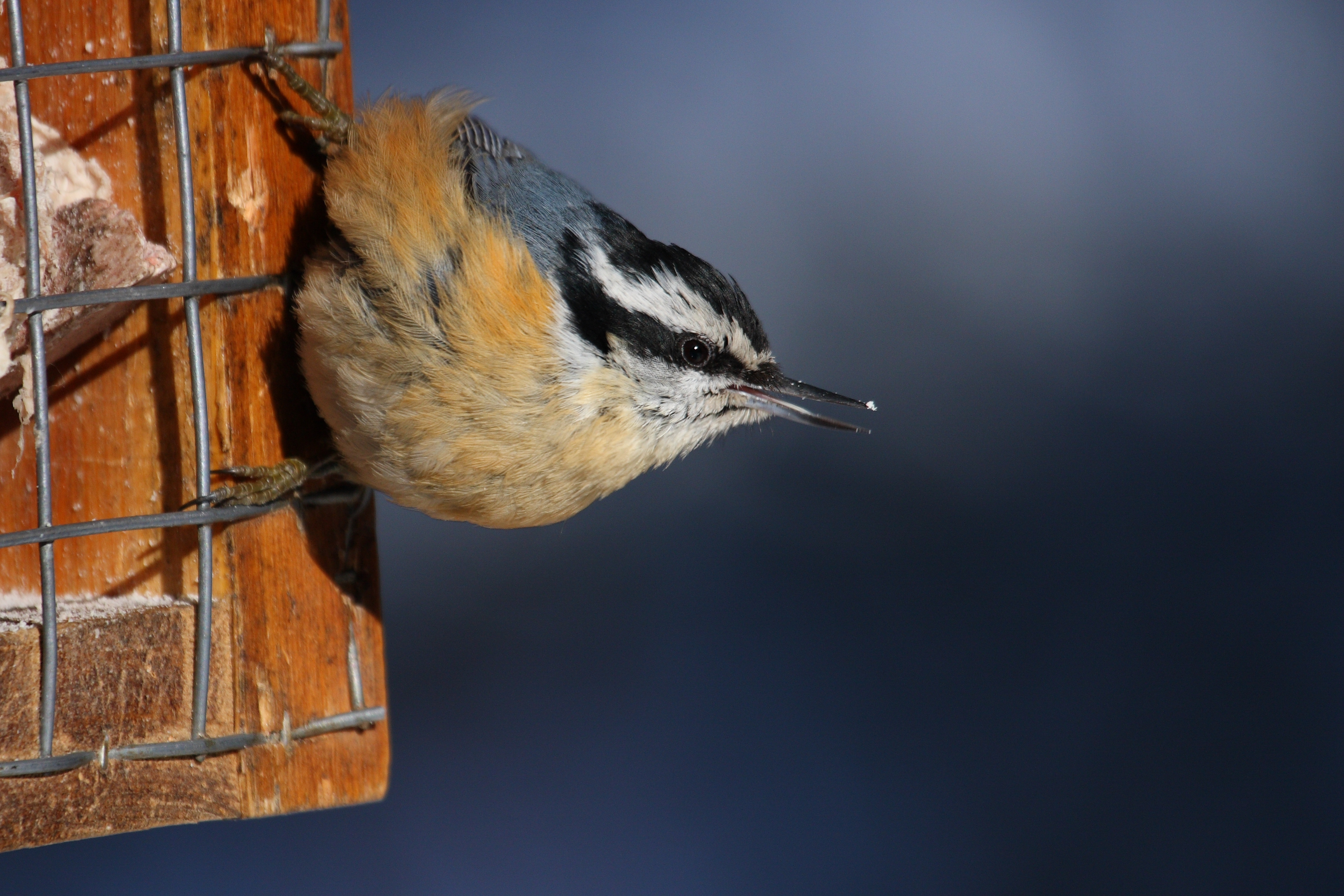
Red-breasted nuthatch

Nuthatches are small woodland birds. They have the unusual ability to climb down trees head first, unlike other birds which can only go upwards. Nuthatches have big heads, short tails and powerful bills and feet.

- Red-breasted nuthatch, Sitta canadensis (B)
- White-breasted nuthatch, Sitta carolinensis (B)
- Pygmy nuthatch, Sitta pygmaea (A)

== Treecreepers ==
Order: Passeriformes Family: Certhiidae

Treecreepers are small woodland birds, brown above and white below. They have thin pointed down-curved bills, which they use to extricate insects from bark. They have stiff tail feathers, like woodpeckers, which they use to support themselves on vertical trees.

- Brown creeper, Certhia americana (B)

== Gnatcatchers ==
Order: Passeriformes Family: Polioptilidae

These dainty birds resemble Old World warblers in their structure and habits, moving restlessly through the foliage seeking insects. The gnatcatchers are mainly soft bluish grey in colour and have the typical insectivore's long sharp bill. Many species have distinctive black head patterns (especially males) and long, regularly cocked, black-and-white tails.

- Blue-grey gnatcatcher, Polioptila caerulea (A)

== Wrens ==
Order: Passeriformes Family: Troglodytidae

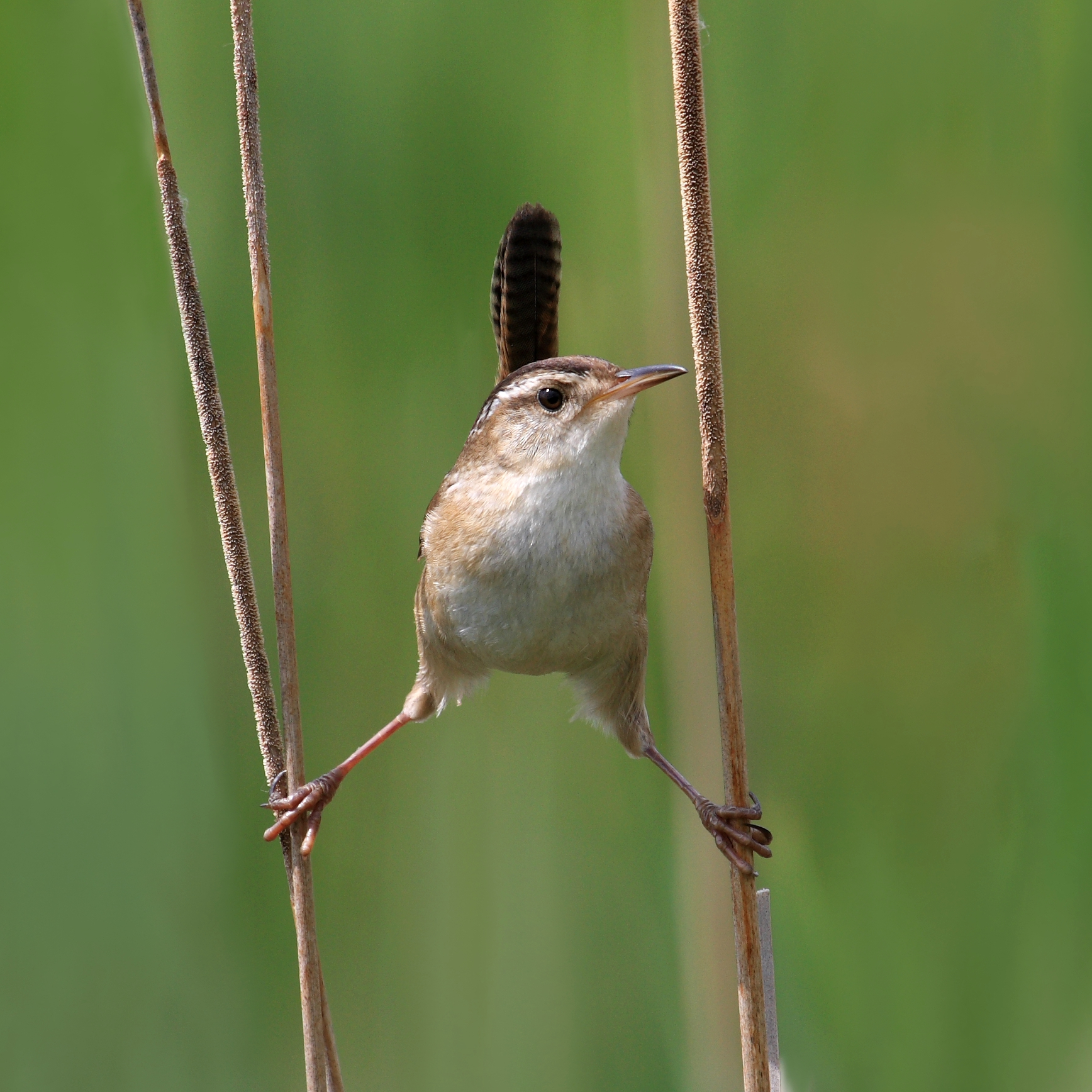
Marsh wren

Wrens are small and inconspicuous birds, except for their loud songs. They have short wings and thin down-turned bills. Several species often hold their tails upright. All are insectivorous.

- Rock wren, Salpinctes obsoletus (B)
- Carolina wren, Thryothorus ludovicianus (A)
- House wren, Troglodytes aedon (B)
- Pacific wren, Troglodytes pacificus (B)
- Winter wren, Troglodytes hiemalis (B)
- Sedge wren, Cistothorus platensis (B)
- Marsh wren, Cistothorus palustris (B)

== Mockingbirds and thrashers ==
Order: Passeriformes Family: Mimidae

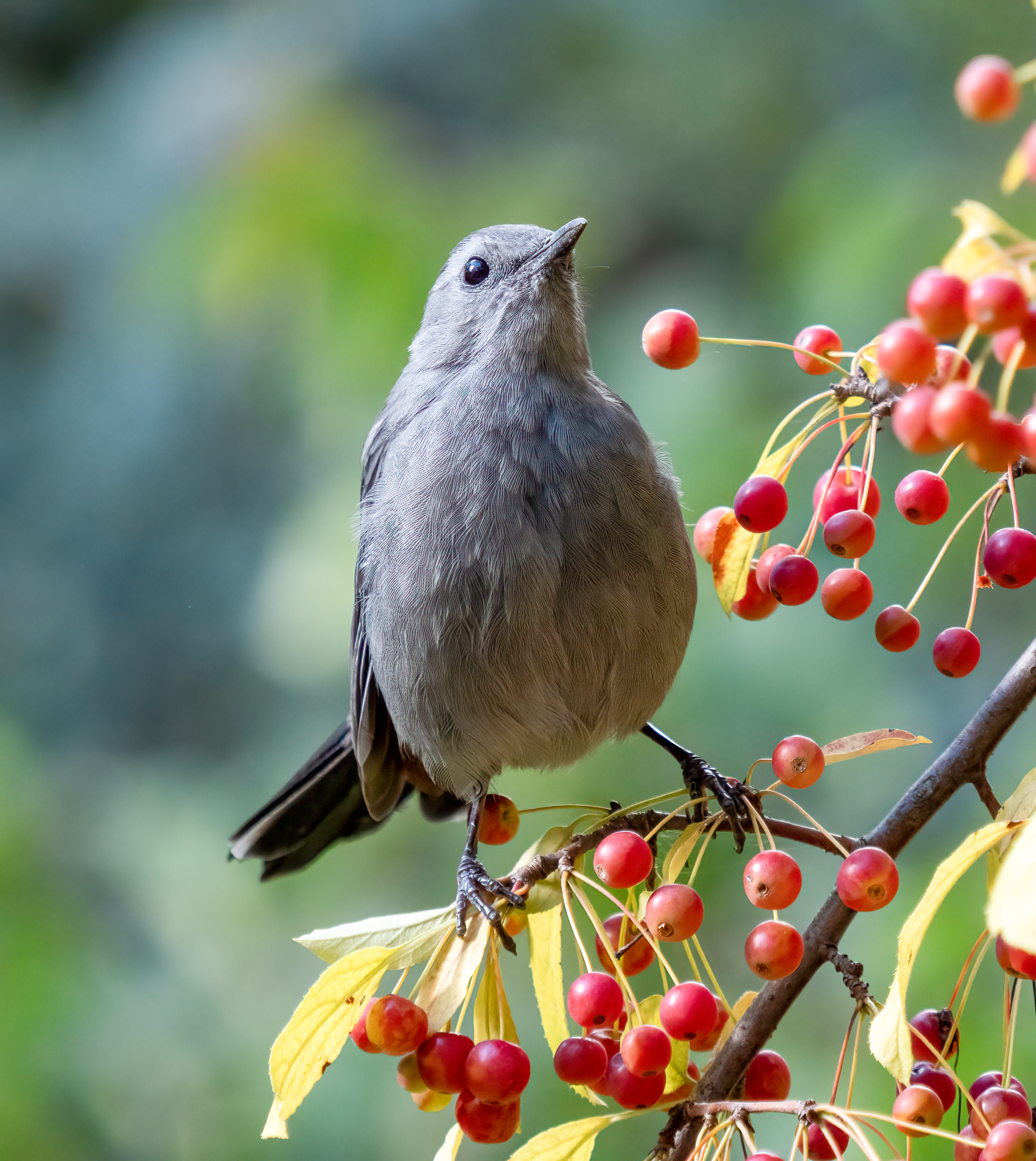
Grey catbird

The mimids are a family of passerine birds which includes thrashers, mockingbirds, tremblers, and the New World catbirds. These birds are notable for their vocalization, especially their remarkable ability to mimic a wide variety of birds and other sounds heard outdoors. The species tend towards dull greys and browns in their appearance.

- Grey catbird, Dumetella carolinensis (B)
- Curve-billed thrasher, Toxostoma curvirostre (A)
- Brown thrasher, Toxostoma rufum (B)
- Bendire's thrasher, Toxostoma bendirei (A)
- Sage thrasher, Oreoscoptes montanus (A) (B)
- Northern mockingbird, Mimus polyglottos (A)

== Starlings ==
Order: Passeriformes Family: Sturnidae

Starlings and mynas are small to medium-sized Old World passerine birds with strong feet. Their flight is strong and direct and most are very gregarious. Their preferred habitat is fairly open country, and they eat insects and fruit. The plumage of several species is dark with a metallic sheen.

- European starling, Sturnus vulgaris (B) (I)

== Dippers ==
Order: Passeriformes Family: Cinclidae

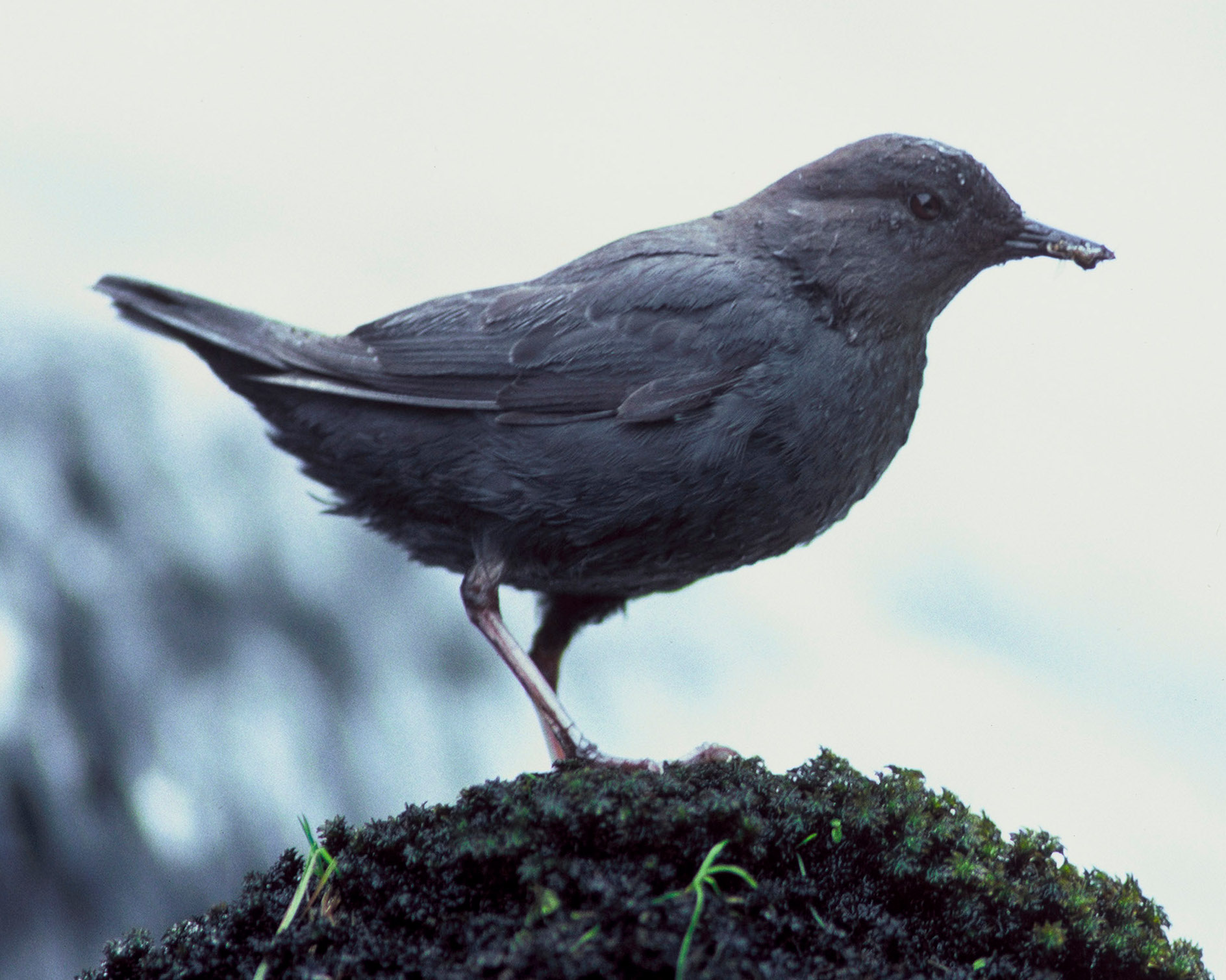
American dipper

Dippers are a group of perching birds whose habitat includes aquatic environments in the Americas, Europe and Asia. They are named for their bobbing or dipping movements. These birds have adaptations which allows them to submerge and walk on the bottom to feed on insect larvae.

- American dipper, Cinclus mexicanus (B)

== Thrushes and allies ==
Order: Passeriformes Family: Turdidae

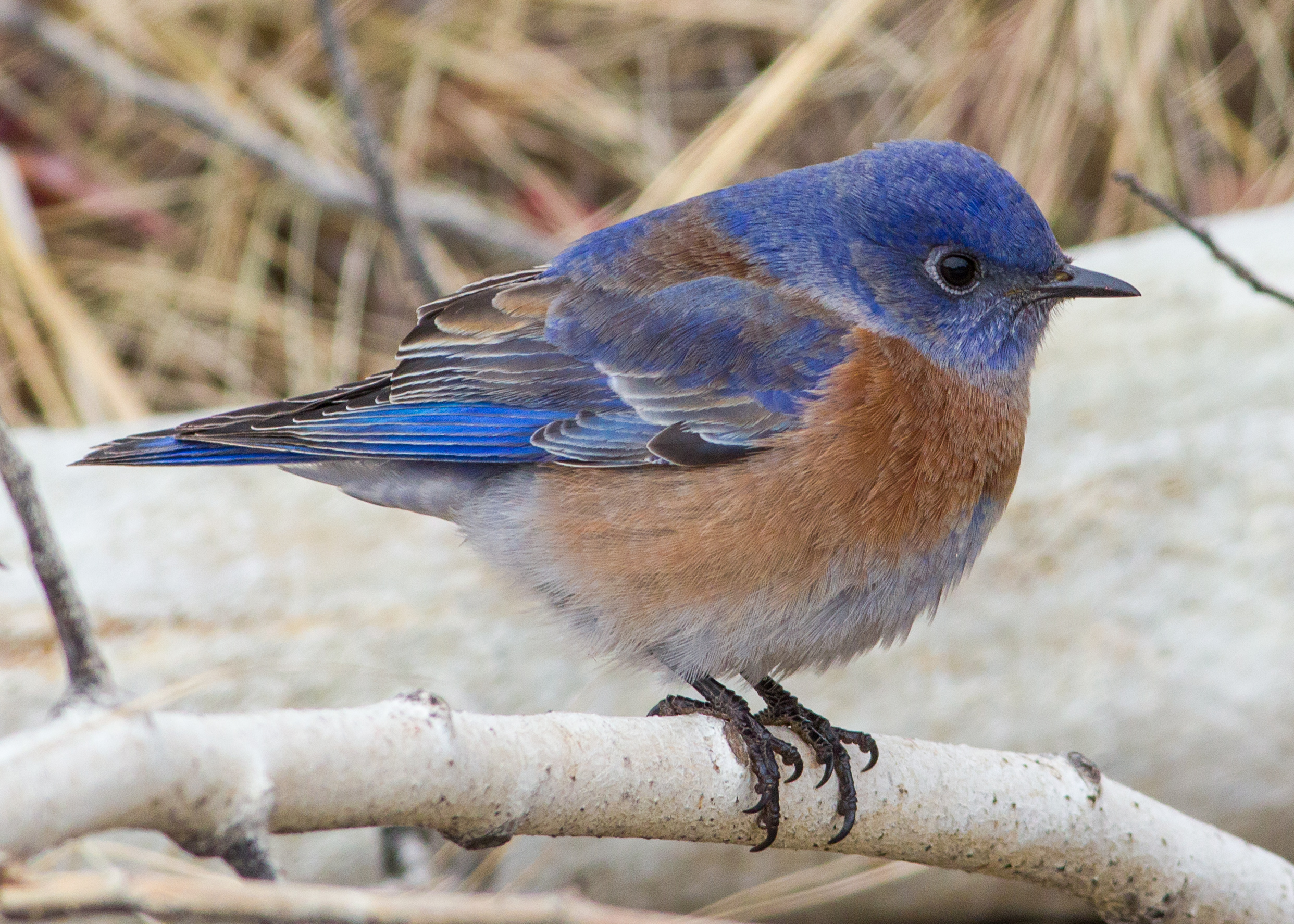
Western bluebird

Thrushes are a group of passerine birds that occur mainly but not exclusively in the Old World. They are plump, soft plumaged, small to medium-sized insectivores or sometimes omnivores, often feeding on the ground. Many have attractive songs.

- Eastern bluebird, Sialia sialis (B)
- Western bluebird, Sialia mexicana (B)
- Mountain bluebird, Sialia currucoides (B)
- Townsend's solitaire, Myadestes townsendi (B)
- Veery, Catharus fuscescens (B)
- Grey-cheeked thrush, Catharus minimus (B)
- Swainson's thrush, Catharus ustulatus (B)
- Hermit thrush, Catharus guttatus (B)
- Wood thrush, Hylocichla mustelina (A)
- American robin, Turdus migratorius (B)
- Varied thrush, Ixoreus naevius (B)

== Old World flycatchers ==
Order: Passeriformes Family: Muscicapidae

Old World flycatchers are a large family of small passerine birds. These are mainly small arboreal insectivores, many of which, as the name implies, take their prey on the wing.

- Northern wheatear, Oenanthe oenanthe (A)

== Accentors ==
Order: Passeriformes Family: Prunellidae

Accentors are small, fairly drab species superficially similar, but unrelated to, sparrows. However, accentors have thin sharp bills, reflecting their diet of insects in summer, augmented with seeds and berries in winter.

- Siberian accentor, Prunella montanella (A)

== Old World sparrows ==
Order: Passeriformes Family: Passeridae

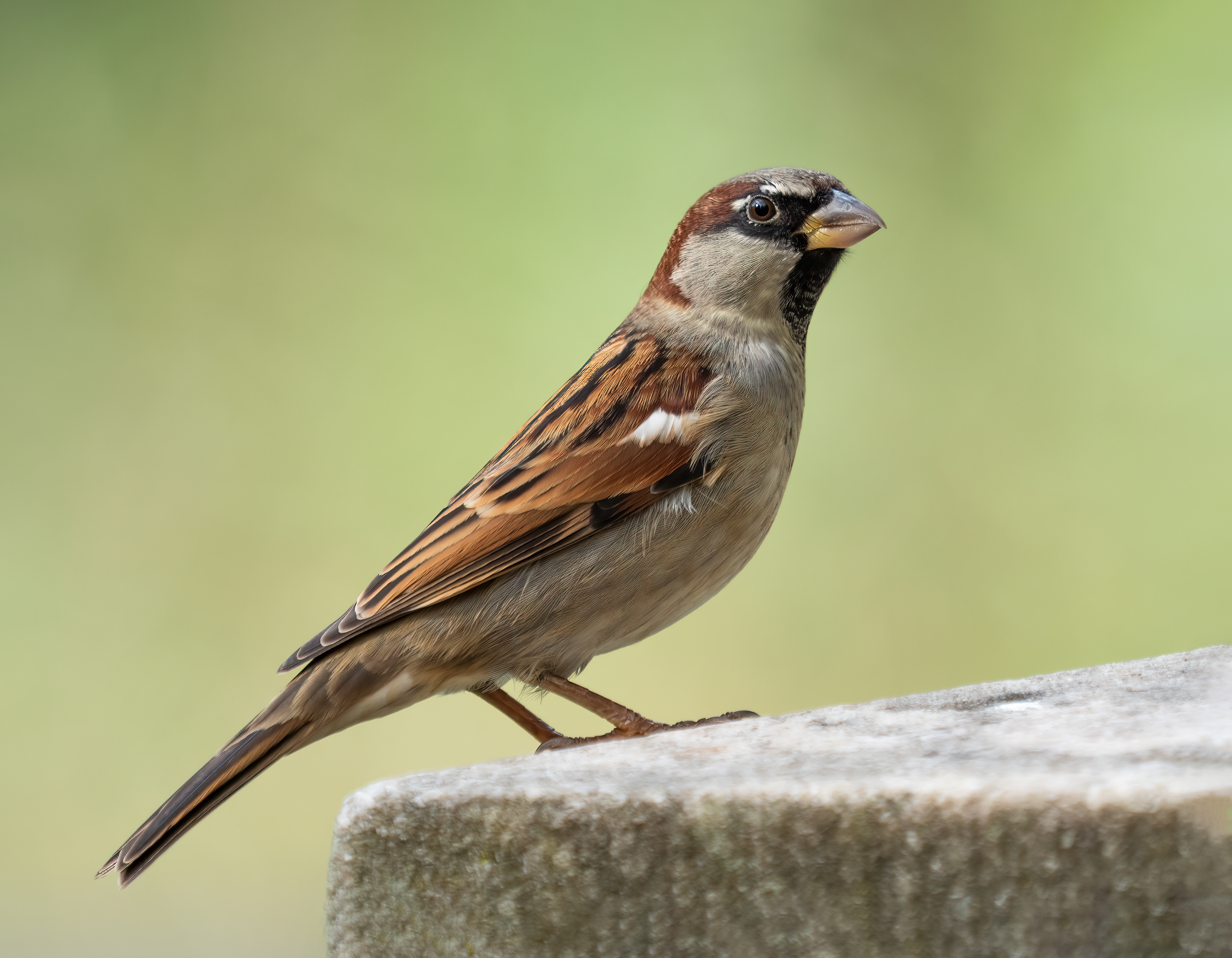
House sparrow

Old World sparrows are small passerine birds. In general, sparrows tend to be small plump brownish or greyish birds with short tails and short powerful beaks. Sparrows are seed eaters, but they also consume small insects.

- House sparrow, Passer domesticus (B) (I)
- Eurasian tree sparrow, Passer montanus (A) (I)

== Wagtails and pipits ==
Order: Passeriformes Family: Motacillidae

Motacillidae is a family of small passerine birds with medium to long tails. They include the wagtails, longclaws, and pipits. They are slender ground-feeding insectivores of open country.

- Eastern yellow wagtail, Motacilla tschutschensis (A)
- American pipit, Anthus rubescens (B)
- Sprague's pipit, Anthus spragueii (B)

== Finches, euphonias, and allies ==
Order: Passeriformes Family: Fringillidae

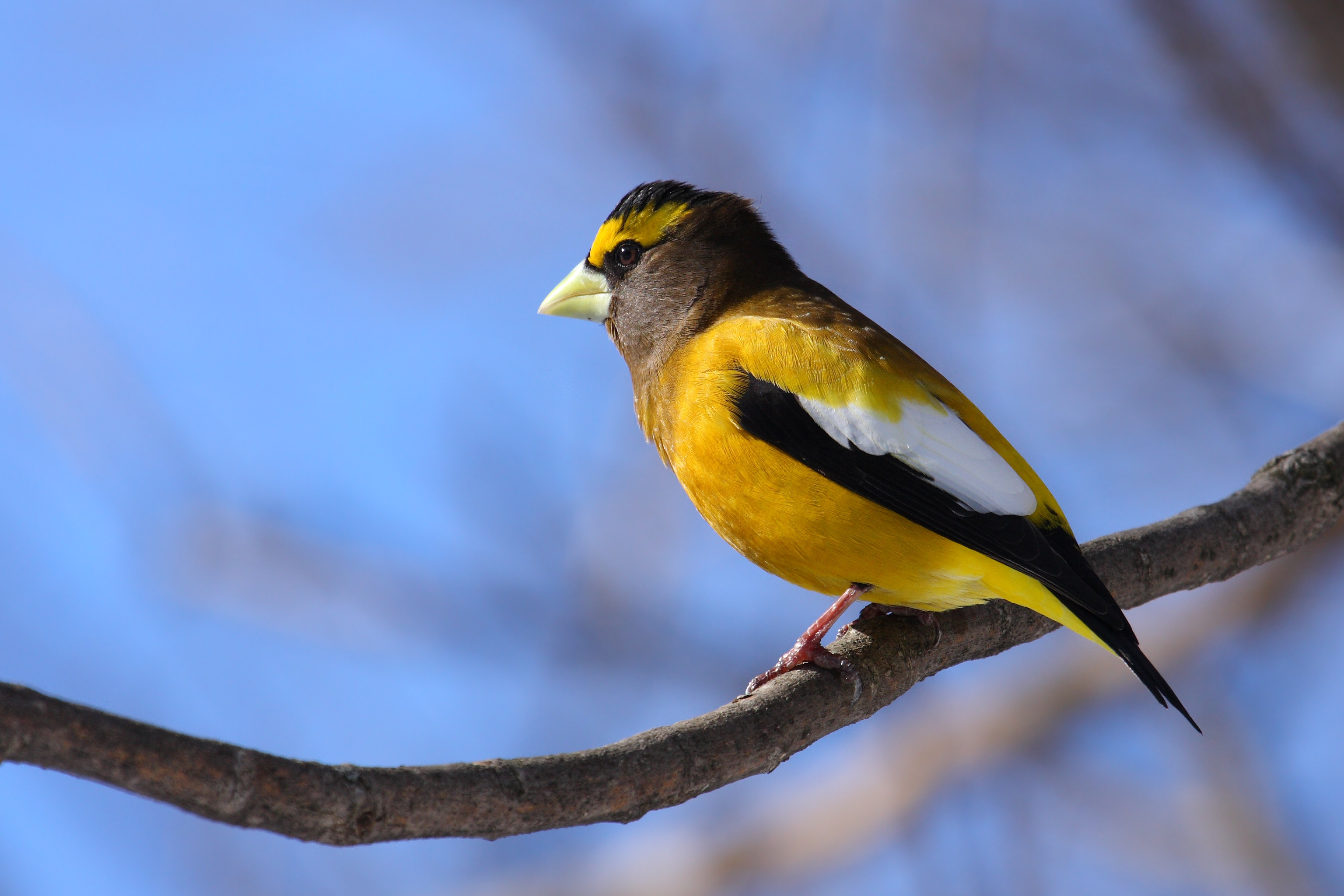
Evening grosbeak

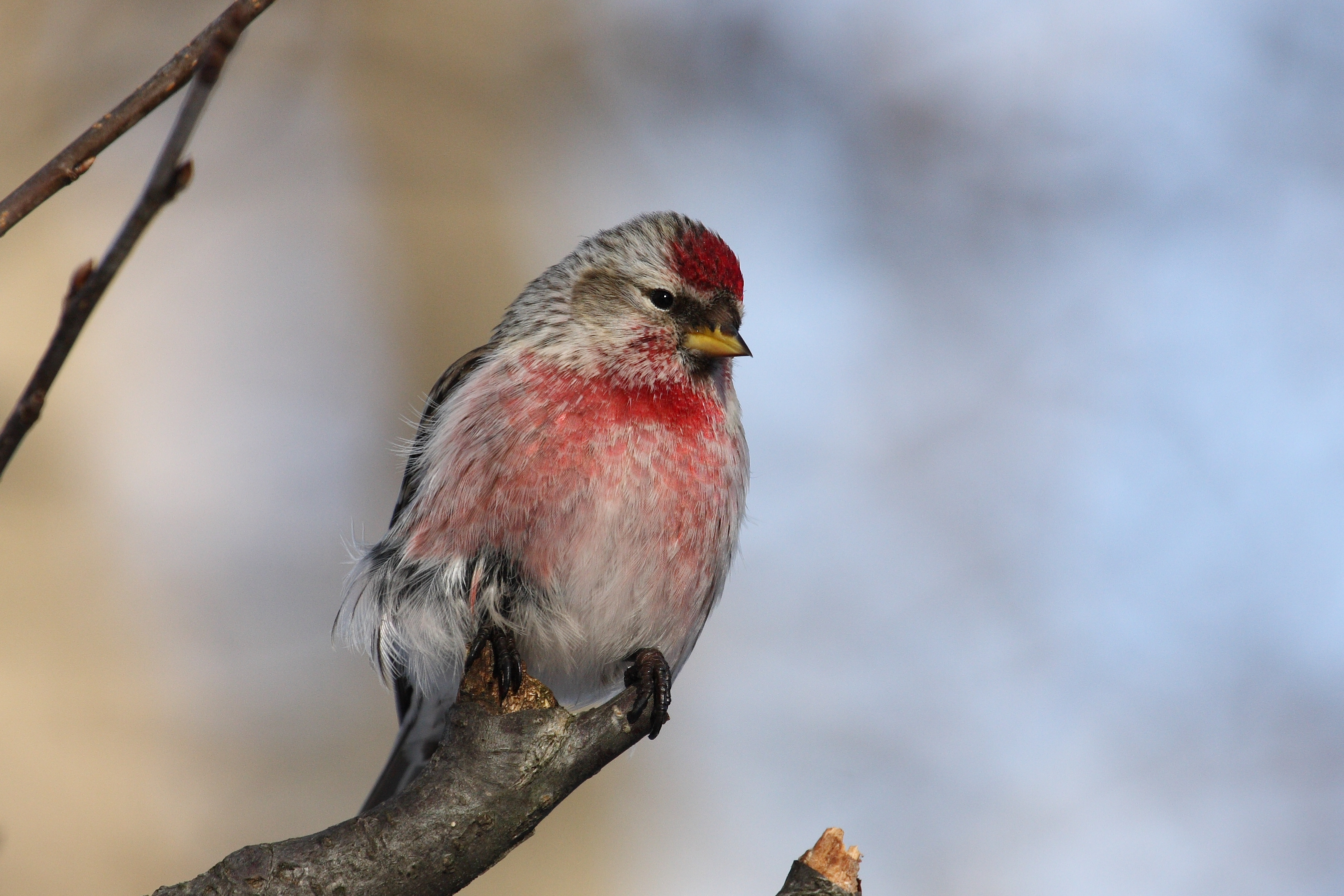
Redpoll

Finches are seed-eating passerine birds, that are small to moderately large and have a strong beak, usually conical and in some species very large. All have twelve tail feathers and nine primaries. These birds have a bouncing flight with alternating bouts of flapping and gliding on closed wings, and most sing well.

- Brambling, Fringilla montifringilla (A)
- Evening grosbeak, Coccothraustes vespertinus (B)
- Pine grosbeak, Pinicola enucleator (B)
- Grey-crowned rosy-finch, Leucosticte tephrocotis (B)
- House finch, Haemorhous mexicanus (B)
- Purple finch, Haemorhous purpureus (B)
- Cassin's finch, Haemorhous cassinii (B)
- Redpoll, Acanthis flammea (B)
- Red crossbill, Loxia curvirostra (B)
- White-winged crossbill, Loxia leucoptera (B)
- Pine siskin, Spinus pinus (B)
- Lesser goldfinch, Spinus psaltria (A)
- American goldfinch, Spinus tristis (B)

== Longspurs and snow buntings ==
Order: Passeriformes Family: Calcariidae

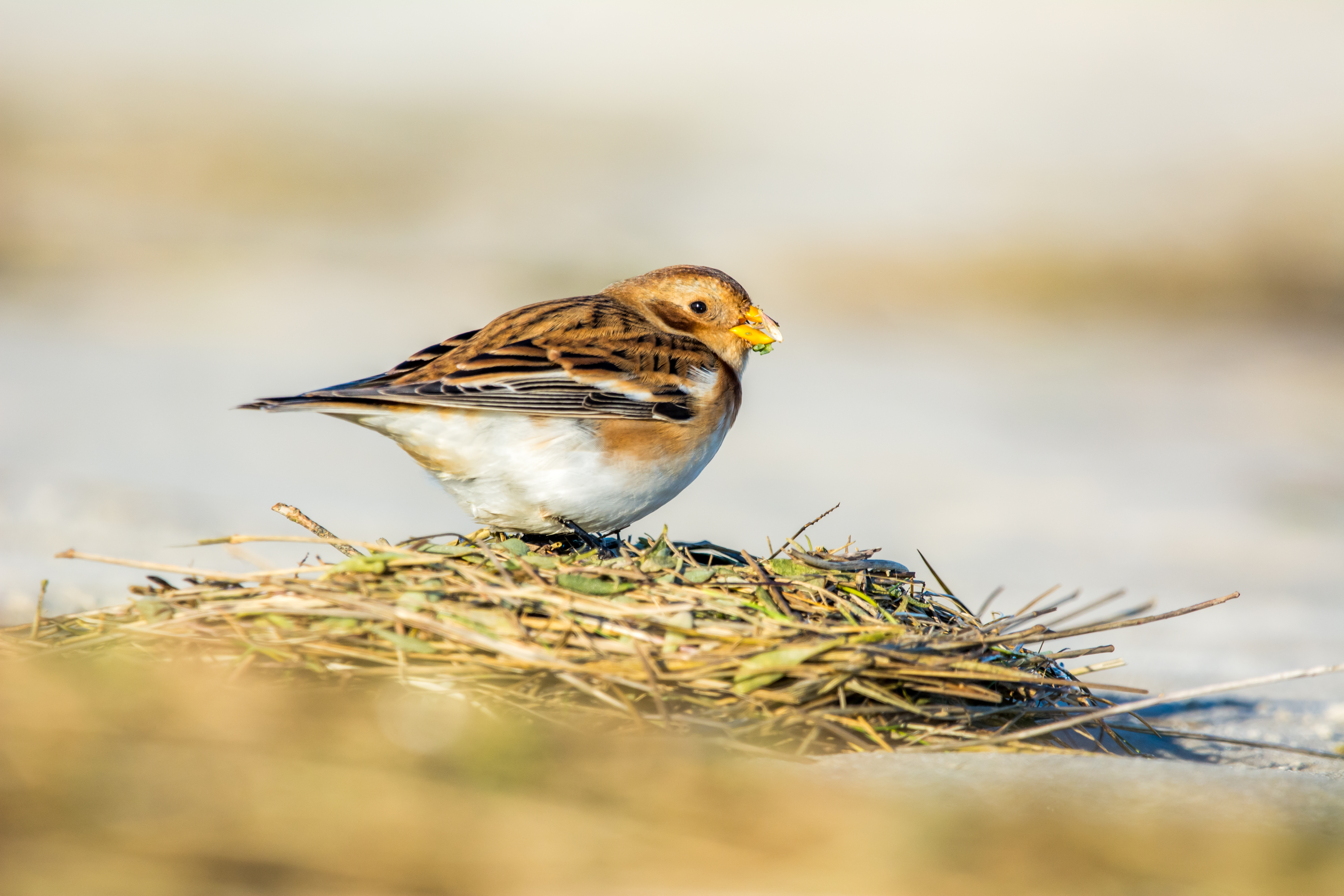
Snow bunting

Calcariidae are a group of passerine birds which are mostly endemic to North America. They are primarily found in open fields, where their plumage helps them blend into their surroundings.

- Lapland longspur, Calcarius lapponicus
- Chestnut-collared longspur, Calcarius ornatus (B)
- Smith's longspur, Calcarius pictus
- Thick-billed longspur, Rhyncophanes mccownii (B)
- Snow bunting, Plectrophenax nivalis

== New World sparrows ==
Order: Passeriformes Family: Passerellidae

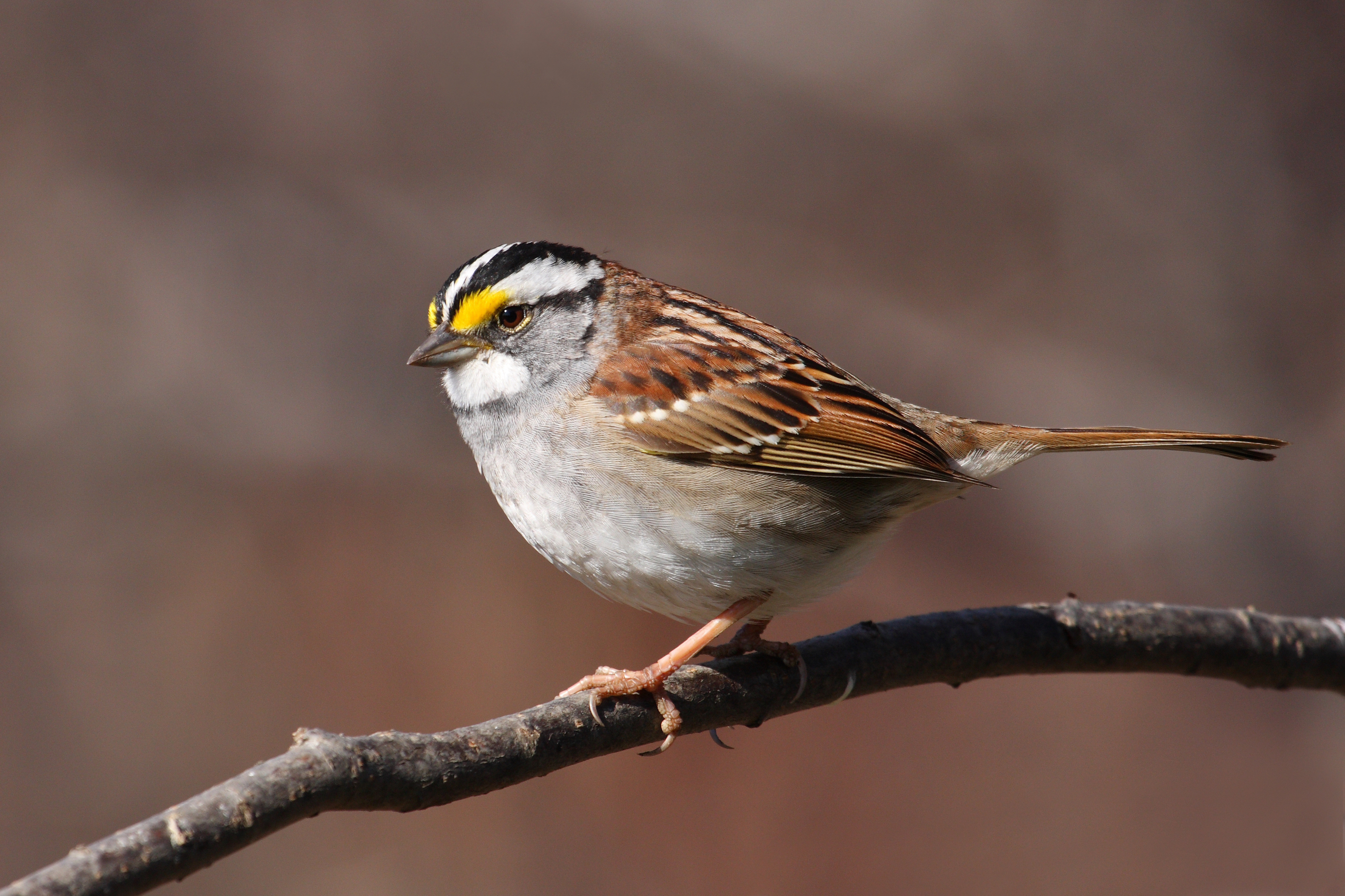
White-throated sparrow

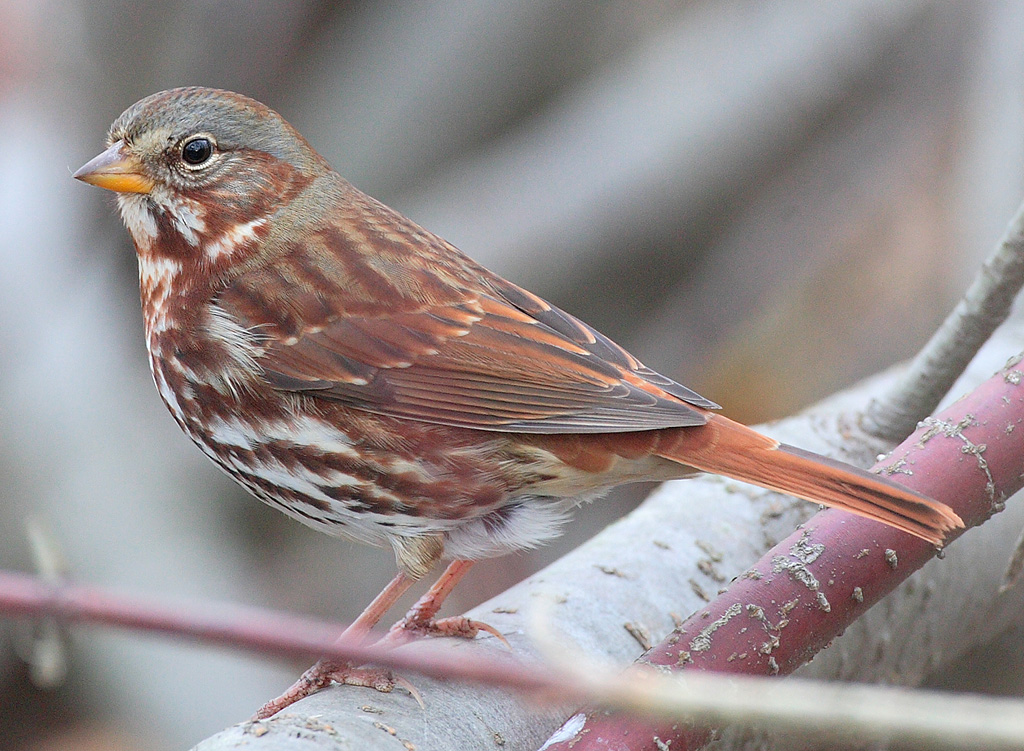
Fox sparrow

Until 2017, these species were considered part of the family Emberizidae. Most of the species are known as sparrows, but these birds are not closely related to the Old World sparrows which are in the family Passeridae. Many of these have distinctive head patterns.

- Cassin's sparrow, Peucaea cassinii (A)
- Grasshopper sparrow, Ammodramus savannarum (B)
- Black-throated sparrow, Amphispiza bilineata (A)
- Lark sparrow, Chondestes grammacus (B)
- Lark bunting, Calamospiza melanocorys (B)
- Chipping sparrow, Spizella passerina (B)
- Clay-coloured sparrow, Spizella pallida (B)
- Field sparrow, Spizella pusilla (A)
- Brewer's sparrow, Spizella breweri (B)
- Fox sparrow, Passerella iliaca (B)
- American tree sparrow, Spizelloides arborea (B)
- Dark-eyed junco, Junco hyemalis (B)
- White-crowned sparrow, Zonotrichia leucophrys (B)
- Golden-crowned sparrow, Zonotrichia atricapilla (B)
- Harris's sparrow, Zonotrichia querula
- White-throated sparrow, Zonotrichia albicollis (B)
- Sagebrush sparrow, Artemisiospiza nevadensis (A)
- Vesper sparrow, Pooecetes gramineus (B)
- LeConte's sparrow, Ammospiza leconteii (B)
- Nelson's sparrow, Ammospiza nelsoni (B)
- Baird's sparrow, Centronyx bairdii (B)
- Savannah sparrow, Passerculus sandwichensis (B)
- Song sparrow, Melospiza melodia (B)
- Lincoln's sparrow, Melospiza lincolnii (B)
- Swamp sparrow, Melospiza georgiana (B)
- Green-tailed towhee, Pipilo chlorurus (A)
- Spotted towhee, Pipilo maculatus (B)
- Eastern towhee, Pipilo erythrophthalmus (A)

== Yellow-breasted chat ==
Order: Passeriformes Family: Icteriidae

This species was historically placed in the wood-warblers (Parulidae) but nonetheless most authorities were unsure if it belonged there. It was placed in its own family in 2017.

- Yellow-breasted chat, Icteria virens (B)

== Troupials and allies ==
Order: Passeriformes Family: Icteridae

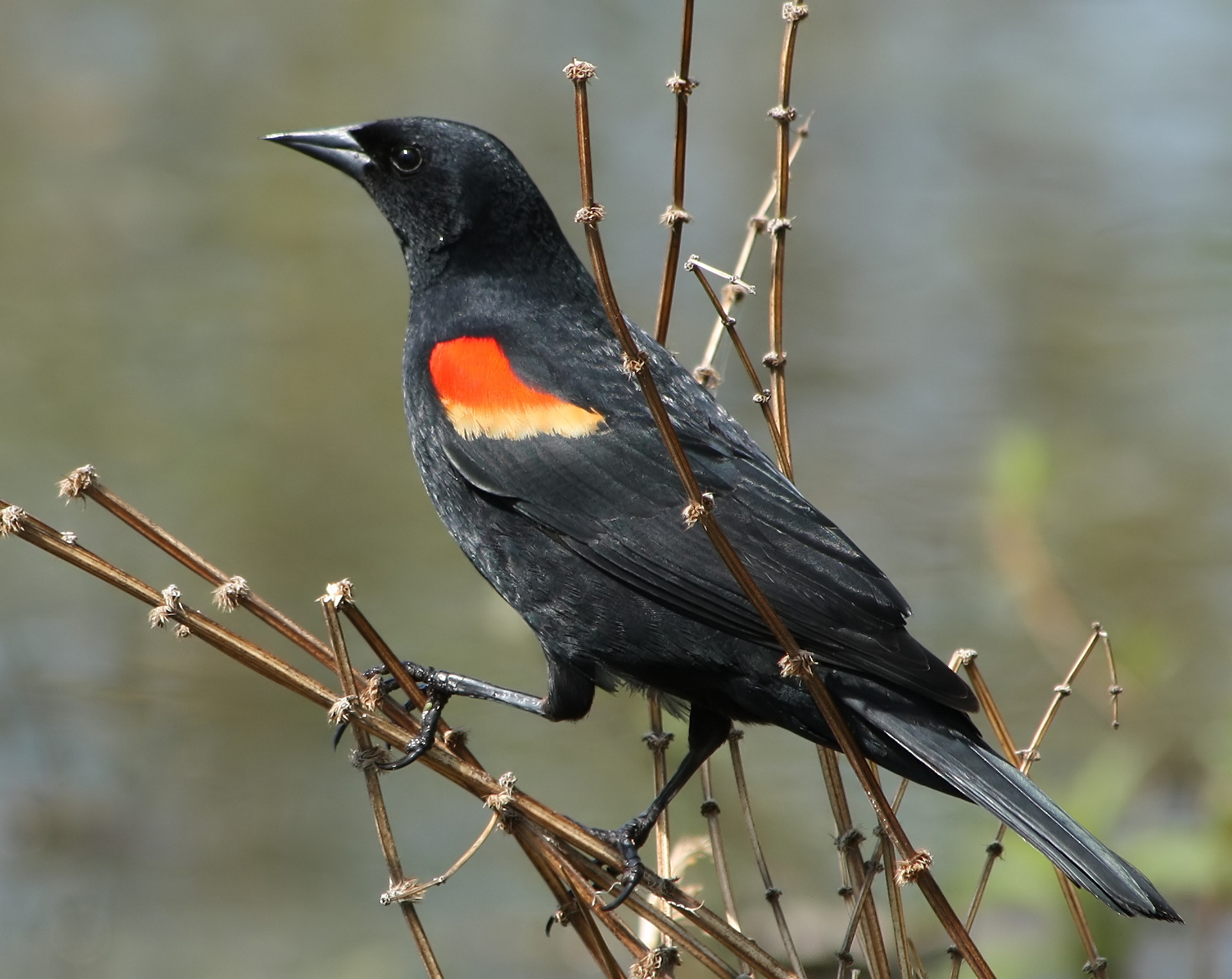
Red-winged blackbird

Icterids are a group of small to medium-sized, often colourful passerine birds restricted to the New World and include the grackles, New World blackbirds, and New World orioles. Most species have black as a predominant plumage colour, often enlivened by yellow, orange, or red.

- Yellow-headed blackbird, Xanthocephalus xanthocephalus (B)
- Bobolink, Dolichonyx oryzivorus (B)
- Eastern meadowlark, Sturnella magna (A)
- Western meadowlark, Sturnella neglecta (B)
- Orchard oriole, Icterus spurius (A)
- Bullock's oriole, Icterus bullockii (B)
- Baltimore oriole, Icterus galbula (B)
- Red-winged blackbird, Agelaius phoeniceus (B)
- Brown-headed cowbird, Molothrus ater (B)
- Rusty blackbird, Euphagus carolinus (B)
- Brewer's blackbird, Euphagus cyanocephalus (B)
- Common grackle, Quiscalus quiscula (B)
- Great-tailed grackle, Quiscalus mexicanus (A)

== New World warblers ==
Order: Passeriformes Family: Parulidae

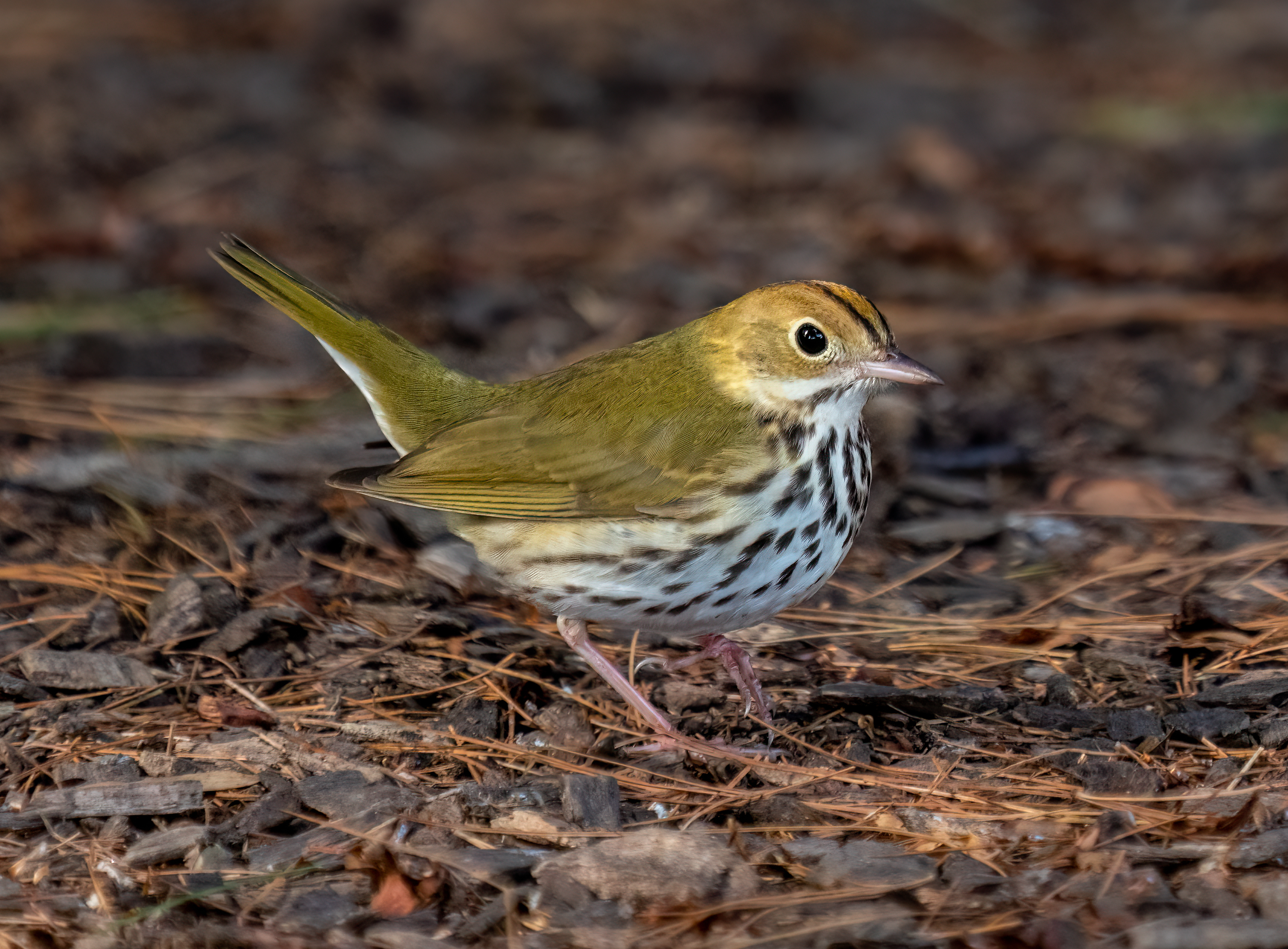
Ovenbird

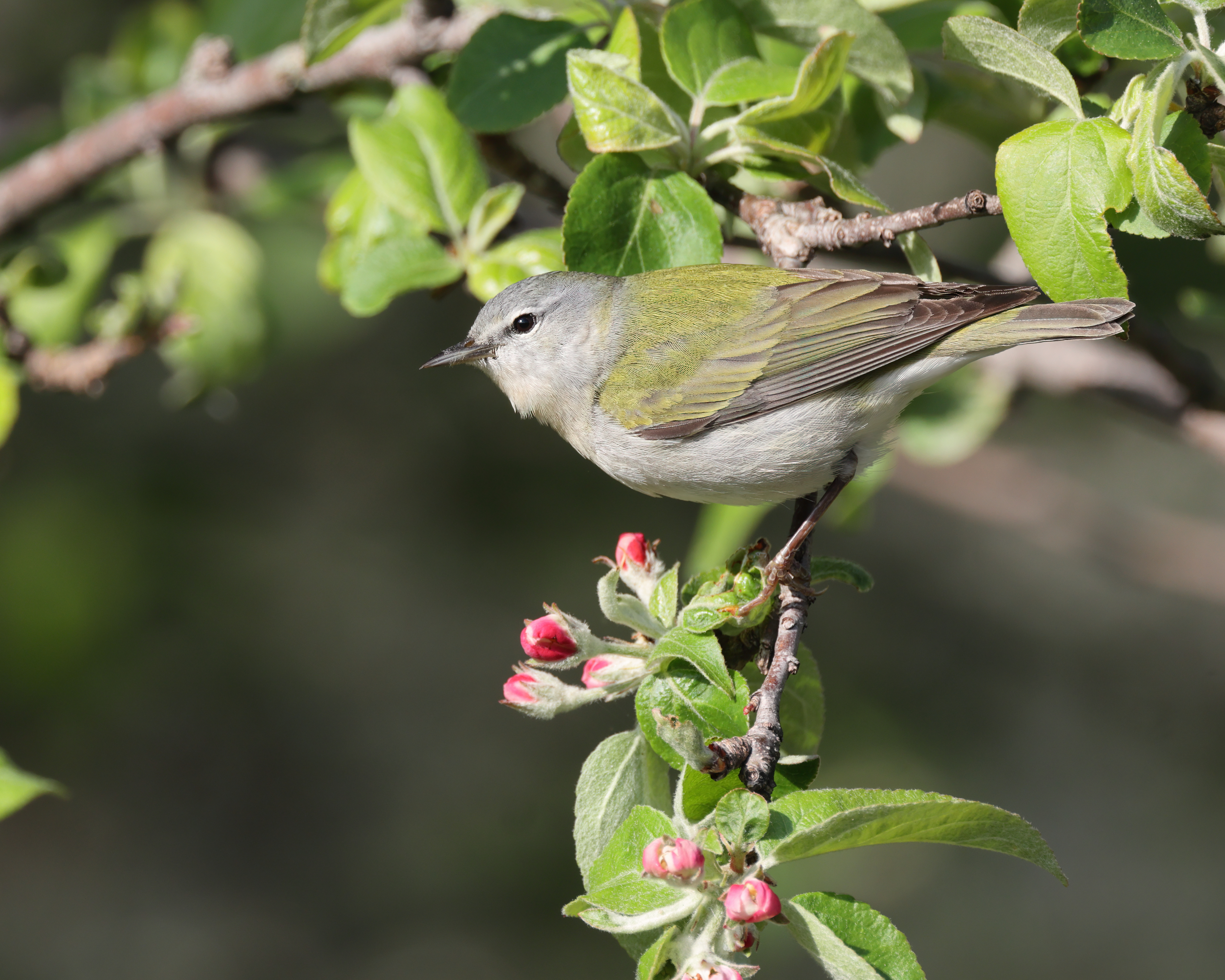
Tennessee warbler

The New world warblers are a group of small often colourful passerine birds restricted to the New World. Most are arboreal, but some are more terrestrial. Most members of this family are insectivores.

- Ovenbird, Seiurus aurocapilla (B)
- Northern waterthrush, Parkesia noveboracensis (B)
- Golden-winged warbler, Vermivora chrysoptera (A)
- Blue-winged warbler, Vermivora cyanoptera (A)
- Black-and-white warbler, Mniotilta varia (B)
- Prothonotary warbler, Protonotaria citrea (A)
- Tennessee warbler, Leiothlypis peregrina (B)
- Orange-crowned warbler, Leiothlypis celata (B)
- Lucy's warbler, Leiothlypis luciae (A)
- Nashville warbler, Leiothlypis ruficapilla (B)
- Connecticut warbler, Oporornis agilis (B)
- MacGillivray's warbler, Geothlypis tolmiei (B)
- Mourning warbler, Geothlypis philadelphia (B)
- Kentucky warbler, Geothlypis formosa (A)
- Common yellowthroat, Geothlypis trichas (B)
- Hooded warbler, Setophaga citrina (A)
- American redstart, Setophaga ruticilla (B)
- Cape May warbler, Setophaga tigrina (B)
- Northern parula, Setophaga americana (A)
- Magnolia warbler, Setophaga magnolia (B)
- Bay-breasted warbler, Setophaga castanea (B)
- Blackburnian warbler, Setophaga fusca (B)
- Yellow warbler, Setophaga petechia (B)
- Chestnut-sided warbler, Setophaga pensylvanica (B)
- Blackpoll warbler, Setophaga striata (B)
- Black-throated blue warbler, Setophaga caerulescens (A)
- Palm warbler, Setophaga palmarum (B)
- Pine warbler, Setophaga pinus (A)
- Yellow-rumped warbler, Setophaga coronata (B)
- Yellow-throated warbler, Setophaga dominica (A)
- Black-throated grey warbler, Setophaga nigrescens (A)
- Townsend's warbler, Setophaga townsendi (B)
- Hermit warbler, Setophaga occidentalis (A)
- Black-throated green warbler, Setophaga virens (B)
- Canada warbler, Cardellina canadensis (B)
- Wilson's warbler, Cardellina pusilla (B)

== Cardinals and allies ==
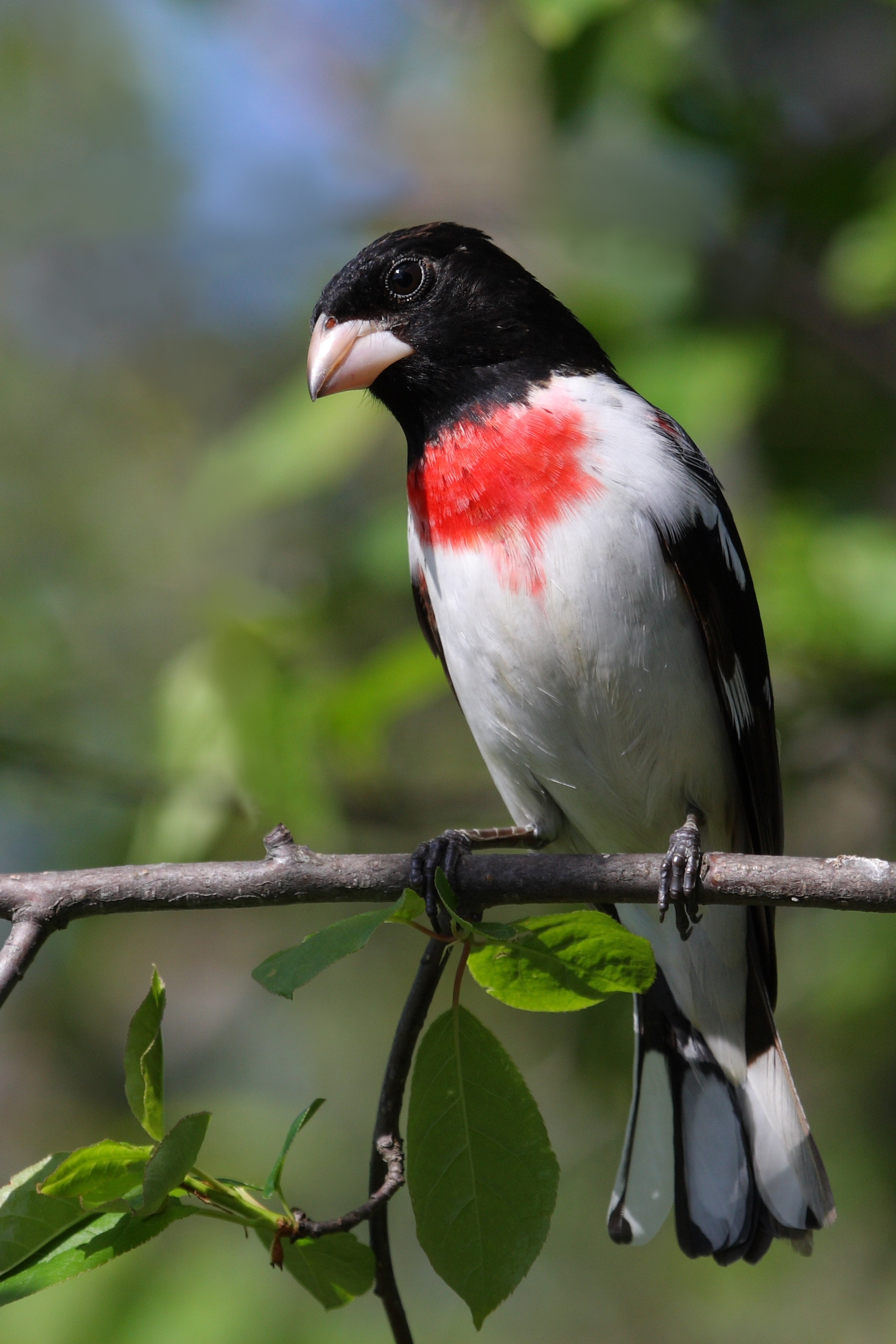
Rose-breasted grosbeak

Order: Passeriformes Family: Cardinalidae

The cardinals are a family of robust, seed-eating birds with strong bills. They are typically associated with open woodland. The sexes usually have distinct plumages.

- Summer tanager, Piranga rubra (A)
- Scarlet tanager, Piranga olivacea (A)
- Western tanager, Piranga ludoviciana (B)
- Northern cardinal, Cardinalis cardinalis (A)
- Rose-breasted grosbeak, Pheucticus ludovicianus (B)
- Black-headed grosbeak, Pheucticus melanocephalus(B)
- Blue grosbeak, Passerina caerulea (A)
- Lazuli bunting, Passerina amoena (B)
- Indigo bunting, Passerina cyanea (A)
- Painted bunting, Passerina ciris (A)
- Dickcissel, Spiza americana (A)
