= Music of Philadelphia =

Music of the city of Philadelphia, Pennsylvania

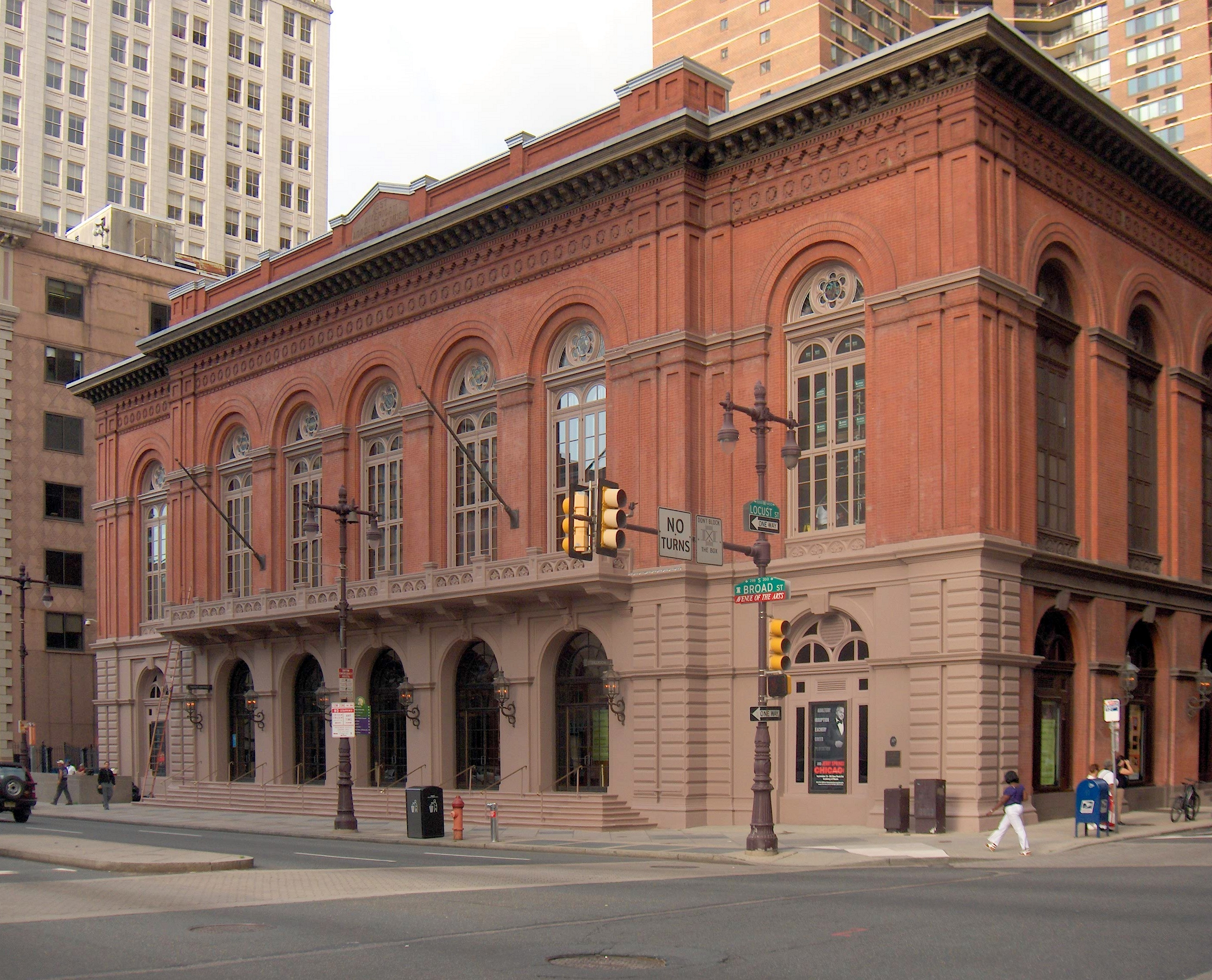
Philadelphia's Academy of Music at Broad and Locust streets, the city's oldest performance venue, presenting operas and concerts annually since 1857

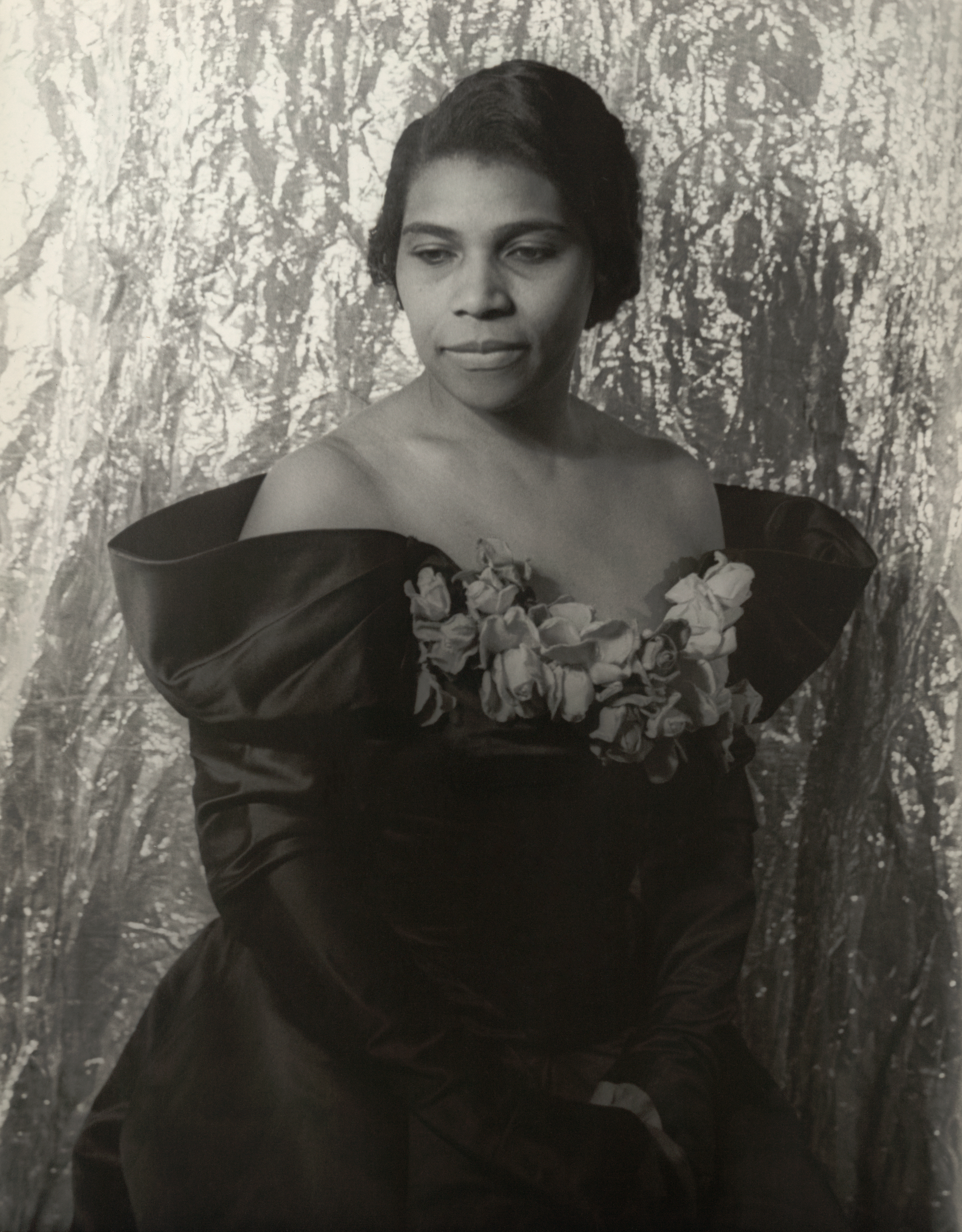
South Philadelphia native Marian Anderson, one of the most celebrated classical contraltos of the 20th century

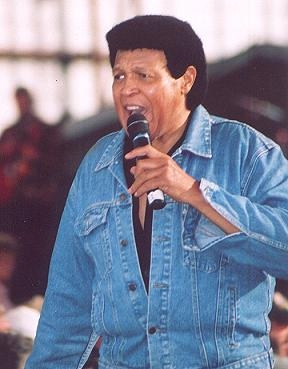
Chubby Checker, one of Philadelphia's first mainstream stars

Philadelphia is home to one of the world's most vibrant and well-documented musical heritages, stretching back to the colonial era. Innovations in classical music, opera, R&B, jazz, soul, and rock have earned the music of Philadelphia national and international renown. Philadelphia's musical institutions have long played an important role in the music of Pennsylvania and that of the nation, especially in the early development of hip-hop, early rock and roll, disco, freestyle music, and soul music (specifically, the Philadelphia soul genre). Philadelphia's diverse population has also given it a reputation for styles ranging from dancehall to Irish traditional music, as well as a thriving classical and folk music scene.

The Philadelphia Orchestra's third conductor, Leopold Stokowski, championed American classical music of the 20th century, and on tour, in recordings, and notably in Walt Disney's 1940 animated film Fantasia, brought the traditional and modern classical repertoire to a broad American listening public for the first time. The Curtis Institute of Music on Rittenhouse Square, founded in 1924 by Curtis Publishing Company heiress Mary Louise Curtis Bok, has trained many of the world's best-known and respected American composers and performers, including Leonard Bernstein and Samuel Barber during the 20th century, and current stars Juan Diego Flórez, Alan Gilbert, Hilary Hahn, Jennifer Higdon, Lang Lang, and Ray Chen.

The city has played an equally prominent role in developing popular music. In the early years of rock and roll, a number of South Philadelphia-born popular vocalists made Philadelphia and popular music virtually synonymous, including Chubby Checker, Frankie Avalon, and Bobby Rydell. This led to the airing of the popular rock and roll dance show American Bandstand, hosted by Dick Clark from the WPVI-TV studios at 46th and Market Streets at the time, where teenagers would descend in droves after school to be televised dancing to the latest hits on the pop charts in front of a national audience.

Today, Philadelphia is well known for its hip-hop scene, including superstars like The Roots, Meek Mill, and Lil Uzi Vert. It is also well known for its alternative rock and DIY music scene, which has been a launchpad for indie rock stars including Alex G, Kurt Vile, The War on Drugs, Modern Baseball, Japanese Breakfast, and Hop Along.

== Music venues and institutions ==
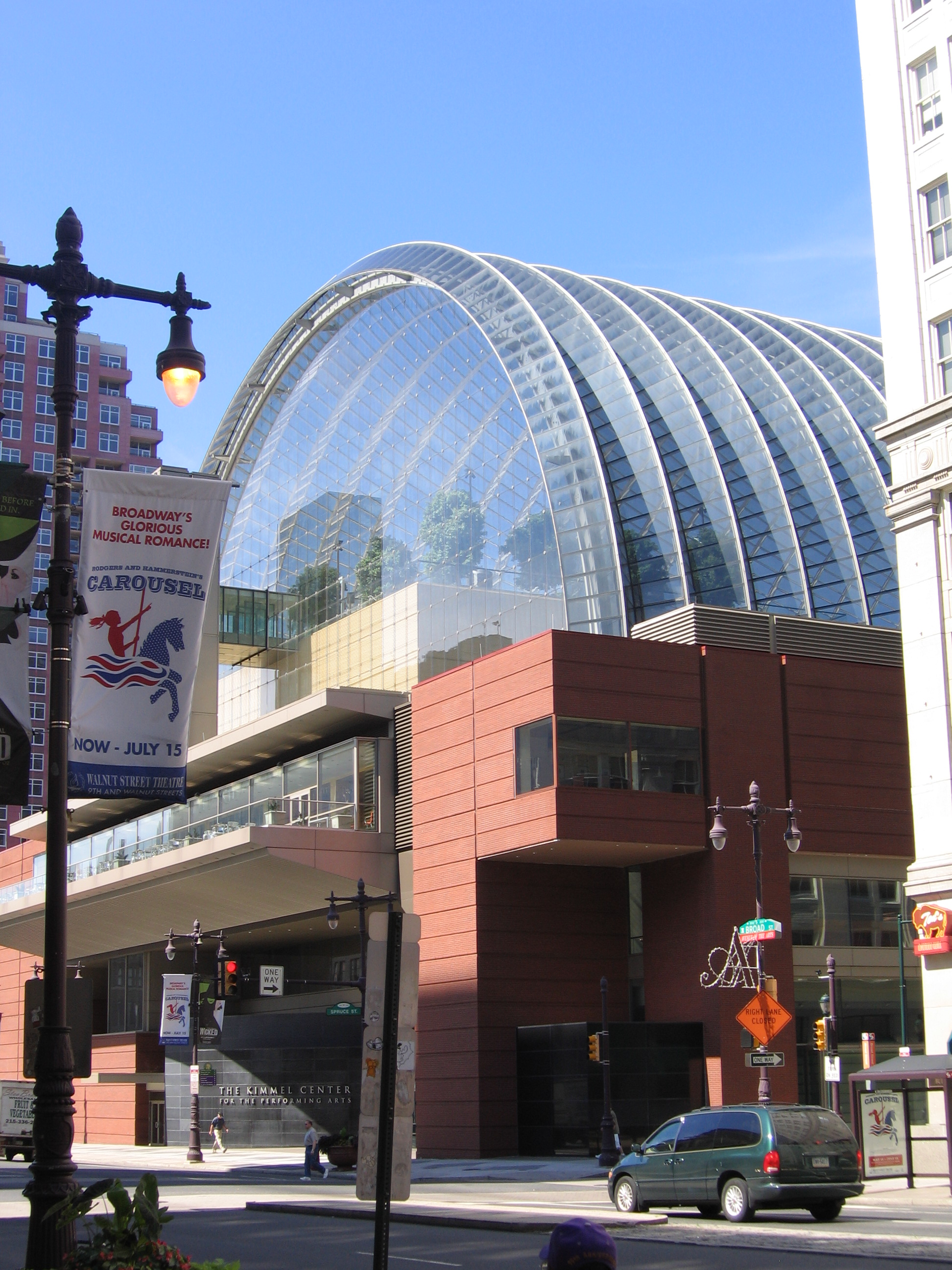
The Kimmel Center for the Performing Arts at 300 South Broad Street in July 2007

Philadelphia has a wide variety of performance venues for music. The city's most senior venue is the famed Academy of Music. Established in 1857, the academy is the longest continuously operating opera house in the United States that is still being used for its original purpose. At the very center of Philadelphia's musical life, the academy is home to many internationally recognized performance ensembles, including the Philly Pops, the Philadelphia Ballet, and Opera Philadelphia. The academy also presents touring artists and musical theatre of the highest caliber.

The most recent addition to the city's list of venues is the Kimmel Center for the Performing Arts, home of the internationally renowned Philadelphia Orchestra, which opened in 2001. The Philadelphia Singers often sing in concerts with the orchestra. The center is also home to the Chamber Orchestra of Philadelphia, Philadanco and the Philadelphia Chamber Music Society (PCMS). The PCMS, established in 1986, puts on concerts by internationally renowned performers as well as local ensembles like 1807 and Friends, who have been prominent local performers since 1981.

Also of major importance to the city is the Mann Center for the Performing Arts, one of the largest outdoor amphitheatres in the United States. Established in 1976 as the Robin Hood Dell West, the Mann Center is the summer performance space for the Philadelphia Orchestra. It is also host to major touring artists from all genres of music and is Philadelphia's main venue for popular entertainers. In addition to the Mann Center, the Tower Theater, in Upper Darby Township, Pennsylvania, just outside Philadelphia serves as a destination for many top touring acts.

The Annenberg Center for the Performing Arts is another notable venue in the city. Founded in 1971, the center now includes the University of Pennsylvania's Irvine Auditorium, Zellerbach Theatre and Harold Prince Theatre. The center offers a varied program of more than 170 performances each year, including concerts, theatre, and dance.

Philadelphia has a thriving jazz and cabaret scene, largely due to the efforts of the John W. Coltrane Cultural Society, which honors local jazz legend John Coltrane and helps to promote jazz in the city. There are a number of nightclubs in the city that host live music, most notably Warmdaddy's which has been a hot spot for jazz and blues entertainers for more than four decades. The city is also home to the Philadelphia Clef Club of Jazz and Performing Arts, which has been called the "first-ever club designed and constructed specifically as a jazz institution". Another notable venue is World Cafe Live (WCL), which opened October 2004. A three-tiered music hall, restaurant, and bar, WCL has been host to such artists as George Clinton and the Parliament-Funkadelic, Rhett Miller, Natalie Cole, KT Tunstall, Allen Toussaint, Pink Martini, Buckethead, and Liz Phair.

Philadelphia's diverse ethnic groups have established several organizations that promote their musical styles, including the Asian Arts Initiative and the Latin American Musicians Association (AMLA). The AMLA was established by Jesse Bermudez in 1982 in North Philadelphia to promote Latino music and musicians. The association runs a Latin School of Arts, which features teachers like Elio Villafranca and Pablo Batista. The Italian American Broadcasting Network is in Philadelphia and promotes radio stations that broadcast Italian music in southeastern Pennsylvania; the Philadelphia stations that play Italian music include WPHT, WEDO, and WEMG. The Painted Bride Art Center is a local organization that promotes alternative and avant garde music, and Crossroads Music is the city's only organization entirely dedicated to presenting musicians with roots in specific cultural traditions from all parts of the world.

Other local institutions include the Philadelphia Gay Men's Chorus, founded in 1981, and the Mendelssohn Club, a choral group that dates back to the 19th century. The Mendelssohn Club was founded by William W. Gilchrist, one of the major figures of 19th century music in the city. Also of note is the Philadelphia Youth Orchestra, one of the most highly regarded children's groups in the United States, having performed worldwide since forming in 1939.

A local and highly respected musical novelty is the Wanamaker Organ, located in the Center City Macy's department store at 1300 Market. Its organ was built in 1904, designed by organ architect George Ashdown Audsley. The organ was so large it required thirteen freight cars to bring it from St. Louis. Once in Philadelphia, the organ was made even larger, with additional pipes added—3,000 were added by 1917, and between 1924 and 1930, 10,000 more were added. The modern organ has 28,500, ranging from a 32-foot (9.8 m) long and 3-inch (76 mm) thick pipe made of Oregon sugar pine and a tiny, quarter-inch long pipe. Performances on the Wanamaker Organ are given twice a day, Monday through Saturday.

== Music festivals and annual events ==
Major music festivals in Philadelphia include the West Oak Lane Jazz Festival (formerly held annually in June), the Bach Festival of Philadelphia (since 1976), and the long-standing and historical Philadelphia Folk Festival. There are also a number of different summer concert series and ethnic festivals held at Penn's Landing, including the Smooth Jazz Summer Nights Series in August. The Jazz on the Ave Music Festival (since 2006) typically takes place in mid August on Broad Street and Cecil B. Moore Avenue featuring Jazz, Soul, Gospel and R&B, as well as some contemporary urban music. The Philadelphia Céilí Group is a prominent local organization that promotes Irish music, and runs a festival, which the Group claims is among the oldest continuous Irish traditional festivals in the U.S. Not too far from the city is the annual Concerts Under the Stars summer festival in Upper Merrion township. Making Time Festival held on the historic Fort Mifflin, is another important cultural event which happens annually in late September, hosting important dance music acts from around the world as well as historically significant ambient artists and experimental musicians.

Perhaps the most famous annual musical event in Philadelphia is the Mummers Parade, a New Year's Day celebration that features outrageous costumes, old-time string bands and other entertainment. The tradition dates to the mid-17th century, when Finnish and Swedish settlers in Philadelphia celebrated holidays by shooting muskets. Their parade grew more diverse over the years, and the Mummers tradition became official in 1901, and has occurred every year but two since. The Mummers' string band is a large group of several dozen musicians who play banjos, violins, bass viols, glockenspiels, bells, accordions, saxophones and drums in an "old-fashioned, tinny sound approximating the popular music of 1900 and earlier".

== History ==
=== 17th century ===
The earliest music in the Philadelphia region was that of the indigenous peoples of the area, though little is known about their music. The city was founded in 1682 by William Penn of England on land granted to him by Charles II as a place of refuge for victims of religious persecution. As a result, much of the city's early music history is tied to sacred music from a variety of different religious traditions. The city's German immigrants were influential in establishing a vibrant musical culture among Protestant churches and in the field of music publishing during the first half of the 18th century.

While non-religious music was actively performed in homes and in private social clubs during the early colonial period, public performances of non-religious music did not occur until the 1750s. At that time Philadelphia rose to prominence as the major cultural capital in the Thirteen Colonies in British America, and then in the newly-established United States after the Revolutionary War. The city established a reputation for classical music of Haydn and Mozart. It had the best opera and theater scene in the United States during the latter half of the 18th century.

=== 18th century ===
Philadelphia became an important center for music in North America during the colonial era and late 18th century. During the early colonial period, music-making took place mainly in the church and the home. Although the original settlers of Philadelphia were English Quakers who had little interest in music, William Penn's hospitality to other religious groups ensured the eventual growth of musical activities. German immigrants who began arriving in the city around 1700 brought musical instruments with them, built organs, and composed hymns. Some of the earliest printing of sheet music came from these German immigrants and more than 20 editions of German language hymnals were printed in the city before 1750. By the mid-18th century the city was the leading center for music printing in the New World. One of the earliest English-language hymnals from the United States that still survives is an extant copy of Isaac Watts' Hymns and Spiritual Songs, printed in 1741 by Benjamin Franklin. Of the colonial hymnbooks in English, the largest and most significant was Urania, or A Choice Collection of Psalm-Tunes, Anthems, and Hymns, compiled by James Lyon (Philadelphia, 1761).

Colonial Pennsylvania was home to a number of religious minority sects, several of which have played an important role in the musical development of the area. A number of German Pietists settled in the Philadelphia area in 1694, led by Johannes Kelpius. These Pietists lived along the banks of the Wissahickon Creek, and became known as the Hermits (or Mystics) of the Wissahickon. Kelpius was a hymn writer and musician. Kelpius has been said to be the composer of certain hymn tunes, although music historian Gilbert Chase doubts that he wrote the music, much of which, Chase claims, "is taken from readily identifiable German sources". These hymns were translated into English by Christopher Witt, a painter and musician said to have built the first private non-church organ in the colonies of North America.

The city of Philadelphia has also been a major center for Roman Catholic church music. The first Catholic hymnbook published in the United States came from Philadelphia in 1787, entitled Litanies and Vesper Hymns and Anthems as They Are Sung in the Catholic Church; this collection included music scored for treble and bass, with later editions adding a third vocal section, and used highly ornamented plainchant themes in the Mass and hymns. The publisher Mathew Carey was particularly influential, publishing a catechism in 1794 that included hymns in later editions.

Performances of early non-religious music were originally relegated to the home or private social clubs in the city. The earliest known private concert was given in 1734, the first known public concert in 1757. Subscription concerts featuring a chamber orchestra were initiated in that year, including music by contemporary English, Italian, German and Bohemian composers, largely through the efforts of Governor John Penn and Francis Hopkinson, a signer of the Declaration of Independence and amateur composer and performer.

After the American Revolutionary War, a substantial number of professional musicians from Europe arrived in Philadelphia. Rayner Taylor, Alexander Reinagle and Benjamin Carr were the leading figures in the city's musical life around the turn of the 18th century. These men had emigrated from England and were active as performers, composers, conductors, teachers and concert managers. Susannah Haswell Rowson was an important female composer active in the city. She wrote the librettos for two of Reinagle's compositions, and was a successful poet, guitarist, singer, playwright and actress. Benjamin Franklin was also a musician, a guitar teacher and inventor of musical instruments like the glass armonica. In 1784 Andrew Adgate organized the Institution for the Encouragement of Church Music, renamed the Uranian Academy (1787–1800). The school was the center of the city's choral music scene during the latter part of the 18th century.

The earliest known performance of a musical drama in Philadelphia was Colley Cibber’s Flora, or Hob in the Well, a ballad opera performed by a touring opera company from England in 1754. In 1757 Francis Hopkinson mounted an elaborate production of Thomas Arne’s masque Alfred. Both the Society Hall Theatre, built by David Douglass in 1759, and the Southwark Theatre, which opened in 1766 with Arne's Thomas and Sally, staged productions of plays and operas given by the American Company. Although the Quakers and other religious groups expressed their moral opposition to theatrical performances, comic operas by leading British composers were frequently performed, often soon after their premières in London.

During the revolutionary period expensive theatrical entertainments were prohibited, except during the time of the British occupation, and the ban remained in effect until 1789. After the ban was lifted, Philadelphia became one of the nation's main theatrical centers. The New American Company, founded in 1792 by Reinagle and Thomas Wignell, recruited a large number of singers and composers from England. Although the principal repertory was from London, several composers who lived in Philadelphia wrote original operas; among the most successful were Carr's The Archers (1796), Reinagle's The Volunteers (1795), and Taylor's The Aethiop (1814). The success of Philadelphia opera due in part to the construction in 1793 of the New Theatre, later known as the Chestnut or Chestnut Street Theatre, by Reinagle and Wignell. Several Mozart operas made their United States debut in the New Theatre, including Don Giovanni and Marriage of Figaro, both in 1793. Taylor and Carr also worked at the New Theatre which was the most splendid theatre in the United States in its day. The building seated nearly 2000 people, and its design was based on the Theatre Royal, Bath in England.

=== 19th century ===
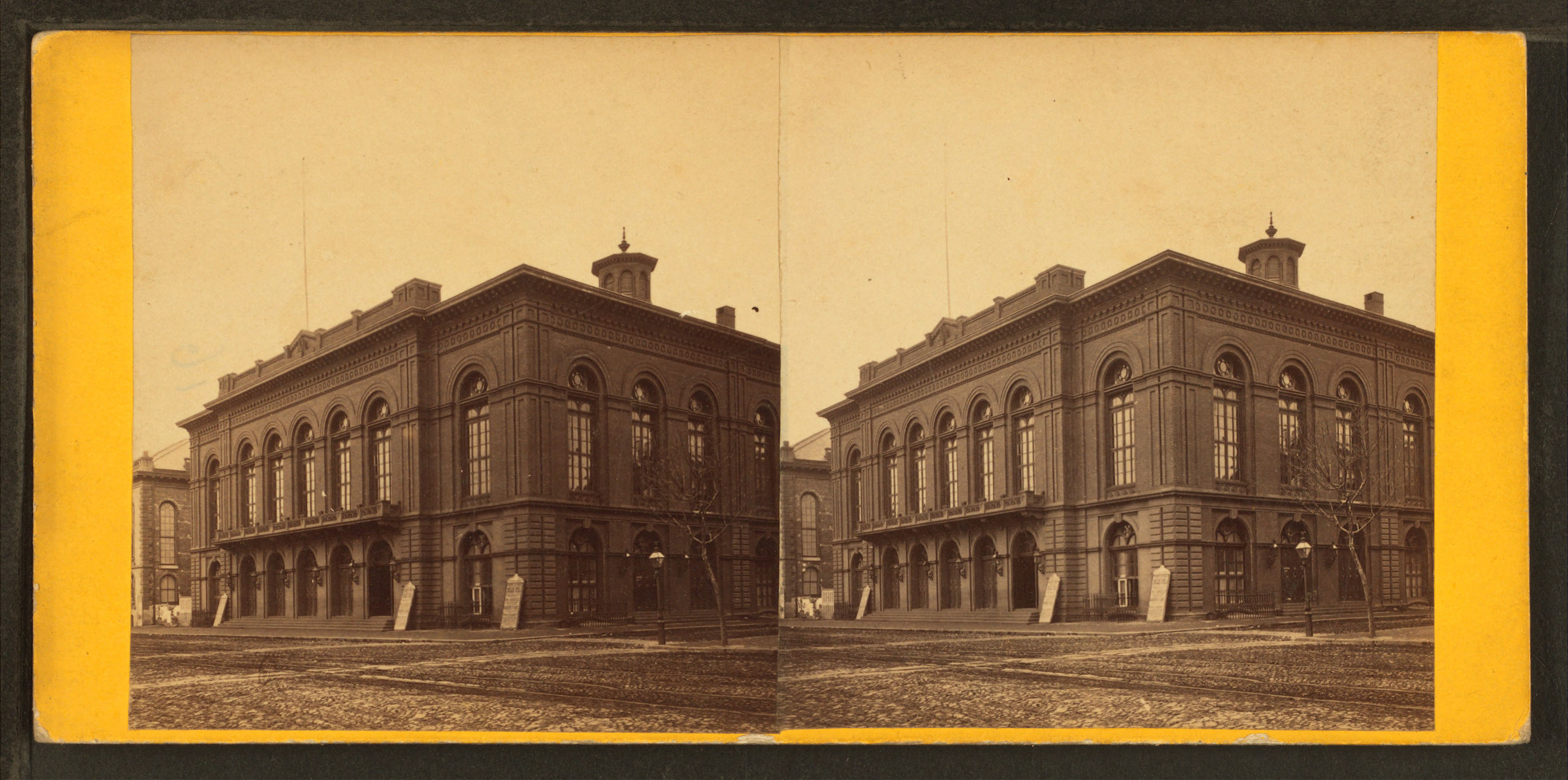
An albumen print of the Academy of Music at Broad and Locust streets, c. 1860

Philadelphia's Holy Trinity Church published the first German-American Catholic catechism in 1810, while the music director of St. Augustine's Catholic Church, Benjamin Carr, also published hymnbooks in the early 19th century. Carr's 1805 work introduced "O Sanctissima" and "Adeste Fideles" to American Catholics. The American Sodality movement began in Philadelphia in 1841, founded by Felix Barbelin; Barbelin personally prepared the first American Sodality Manual, which was followed by others throughout the later 19th century. The Catholic Church of Philadelphia established important institutions of musical education in the early 19th century, with the foundation a singing school and boys choir. Throughout the 1810s premieres of Ludwig van Beethoven’s works like his Eroica Symphony which premiered in 1811. The Sisters of Notre Dame de Namur and the Sisters of the Holy Child published several collections of hymns, some of which were later included in St. Basil's Hymnal.

Philadelphia's African American musical heritage dates back to colonial times, and gained some national and international renown beginning with Frank Johnson, who settled in Philadelphia around 1809. Johnson composed marches and quadrilles that became very popular; he even performed for Queen Victoria in 1837. By the end of the century, African Americans in Philadelphia had their own musical institutions, including a symphony orchestra and choral societies.

With the inauguration of the Musical Fund Society in 1820, musical activity in Philadelphia greatly increased. By the mid-19th century, the city was a national center for musical development, with local religious music changing considerably, and new styles becoming regionally popular, especially English opera. An important concert was held in Philadelphia in the mid-19th century, one of the first major concerts in the country led by a chorus, in this case from the College of Philadelphia. Philadelphia saw the première in 1845 of the first American grand opera, Leonora by composer and music journalist of the National Gazette and the Public Ledger, William Henry Fry. The opera was written in the Italian style and admired so much that it was performed 16 times that season.

Philadelphia's Academy of Music, the "Grand Old Lady of Broad Street," was founded in 1855. When it opened it was by far the finest opera house in the United States. Built by the Philadelphia firm of Napoleon Le Brun and modeled after La Scala, the house has three balconies, an impressive interior and nearly 3000 seats. The groundbreaking ceremony was held on June 18, 1855, with President Franklin Pierce in attendance and the venue opened with a grand ball on January 26, 1857. The first opera performed there was the Western Hemisphere premiere of Giuseppe Verdi's Il Trovatore, on February 25 of the same year. The Academy of Music is the oldest existing opera house in the United States and was declared a National Historic Landmark in 1963; it remains the principal opera house for the city and is the home of the Pennsylvania Ballet. It was the principal concert hall in Philadelphia until the opening of the Kimmel Center for the Performing Arts in 2001. Many first American performances were given there, including Charles Gounod's Faust (in German, 1863), Richard Wagner's Der fliegende Holländer (in Italian, 1876) and Arrigo Boito’s Mefistofele (1880).

In the second half of the 19th century, two additional opera houses were opened: the Chestnut Street Opera House (1885) and the Grand Opera House (1888). With three houses available, the city was able to attract touring companies that featured the finest European stars. A number of American premières were directed by Gustav Hinrichs at the Grand: Cavalleria rusticana (1891), L'amico Fritz (1892), Les pêcheurs de perles (1893), Manon Lescaut (1894) and Hinrich's own opera, Onti-Ora (1890).

The city's first resident orchestra of importance, the Germania Orchestra was founded in 1856. Under the direction of Carl Lenschow, the ensemble gave annual series of concerts up through 1895. The conductor and impresario Theodore Thomas also presented one or two concert series each season between 1864 and 1891. During the centennial celebration of American independence in 1876 the Thomas Orchestra gave concerts throughout the summer but, as the programs were too weighty and the hall too far from the center of the city to attract a large audience, Thomas suffered a great financial loss.

The city's large German population supported several singing societies. The Männerchor (1835–1962), the Junger Männerchor (from 1850) and Arion (1854–1969) have been disbanded, but Harmonie (1855) and eight other German choral groups remain active. Other important early choruses were the Abt Male Chorus, led successively by Michael Cross and Hugh Archibald Clarke, and the Eurydice Chorus (1886–1918). Two choruses still flourishing are the Orpheus Club of Philadelphia, founded in 1872 it is America's oldest men's chorus of its kind, and the Mendelssohn Club, founded in 1874 by Philadelphia composer and musician William W. Gilchrist.

The Philadelphia Roman Catholic musical tradition produced the celebrated and controversial composer Albert Rosewig, who was active in Philadelphia from 1880 through 1919. Rosewig "used romanticized harmony for Gregorian chants, and even harmonized the priest's altar chants" in an attempt to incorporate then-current styles of classical music. His innovations were eventually forbidden by Pius X. Afterwards, the Philadelphia-area conductor and composer led the United States in the development of a more traditional style in the 20th century.

Philadelphia's population, like those of other major American metropolitan areas, grew steadily more diverse in the late 19th and early 20th centuries, with immigrants from Ireland, Russia, and Italy landing on the banks of the Delaware Bay and constituting the largest groups. Philadelphia became a regional center for Italian music and also produced a number of well-regarded Irish musicians and groups.

In the 19th century, Philadelphia was an important center for the composition, publication and performance of popular music, and by the second half of the century more than 100 composers were writing songs and dances for the theatre and salon. Minstrel shows were enthusiastically received, and in 1855 the first black minstrel theatre was opened. The local minstrel performer James A. Bland composed songs that attained phenomenal success, especially "Carry Me Back to Old Virginny" (1878) and "Oh, dem Golden Slippers" (1879). The latter became the 'theme song' of the Mummers, who established clubs and formally inaugurated the annual tradition in 1901 of dressing in extravagant costumes and parading on New Year's Day while performing on banjos, guitars, saxophones and glockenspiels.

The concert soprano Marie Kunkel Zimmerman was described as "Philadelphia's leading soprano" by the Philadelphia Inquirer in 1896. She was later a soloist in many concerts with the Philadelphia Orchestra given between 1902-1907, including as the soprano soloist in Beethoven's Symphony No. 9 for conductor Fritz Scheel's final performance with the orchestra on February 8, 1907.

=== 20th century ===
==== Philadelphia Orchestra ====
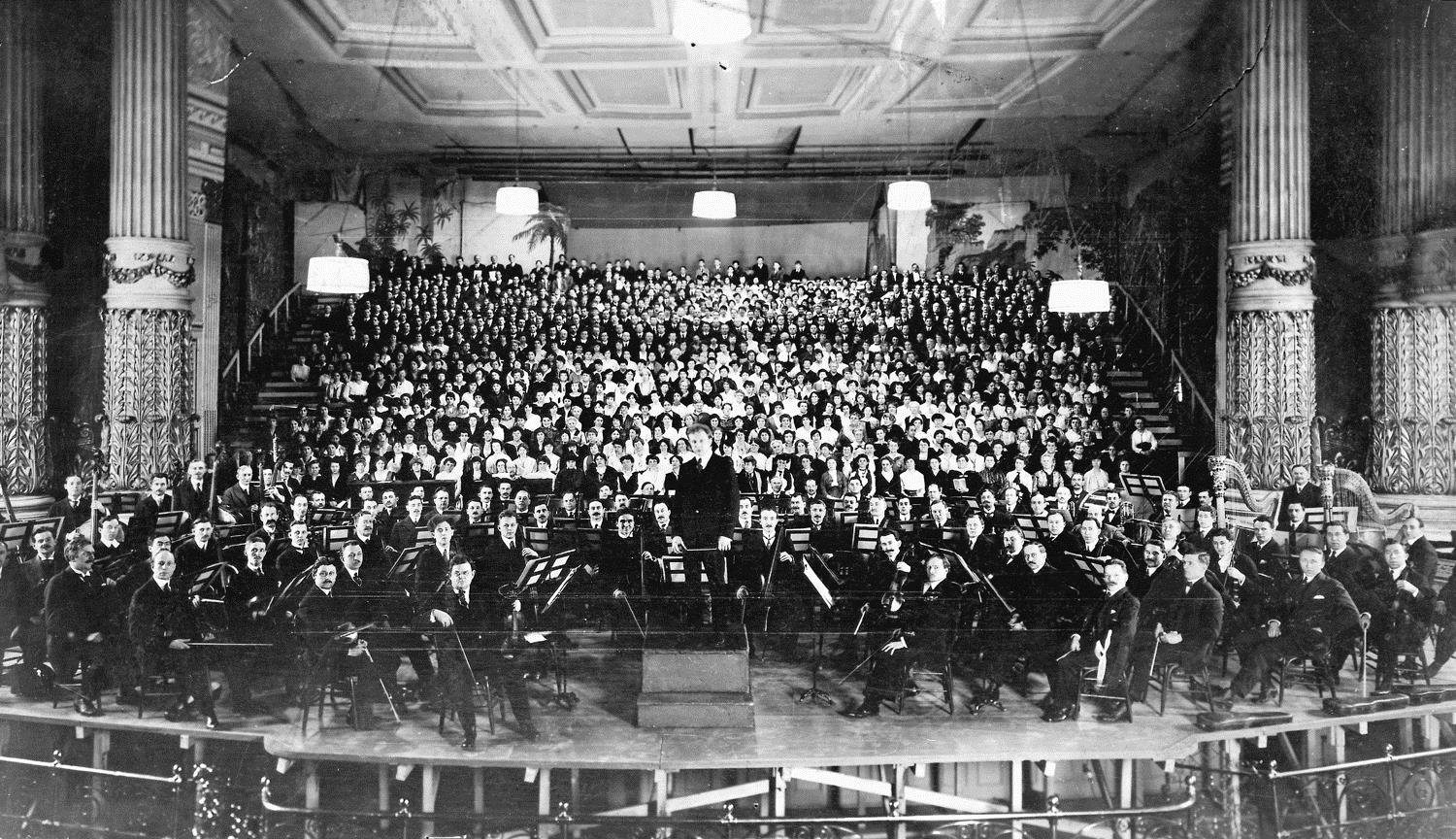
The Philadelphia Orchestra performs the nation's premiere of Mahler's Symphony No. 8 in Eb in 1916, conducted by Leopold Stokowski.

Philadelphia became home to the Philadelphia Orchestra in 1900, for much of its history considered preeminent among American orchestras and one of the "Big Five" American ensembles. The Orchestra was initially led by Fritz Scheel; in 1907, Karl Pohlig took up its baton. But it was the conductor Leopold Stokowski who made the Orchestra one of the most prominent in the country. Stokowski jointly held the conductor's post with Eugene Ormandy beginning in 1936, with Ormandy taking over completely in 1938.

Under the direction of Stokowski and Ormandy, the Philadelphia Orchestra produced several well-known recordings in the 20th century, including the 1940 score for the Disney film Fantasia, and the Orchestra under the flamboyant "Stokie" with his gift for self-promotion pursued an ambitious schedule of national and international tours, becoming the template for the modern classical orchestra in the 20th century. After Stokowski's departure, Ormandy led the Orchestra into the 1970s, preserving its lustrous sound and relying on the popular classical repertoire that had made the "Philly sound" famous, when it became the first American orchestra to visit China and perform in the Great Hall of the People in Beijing; the Chinese tour was well received and has since been repeated three times.

The 20th century saw the Orchestra become the first of its kind to make electric recordings, to perform on its own commercially sponsored radio broadcast, to perform on the soundtrack of a feature film, The Big Broadcast, to appear on a national television broadcast, to record the complete Beethoven symphonies on compact disc, to give a live cybercast of a concert on the Internet, and to tour Vietnam.

==== Opera ====
The Philadelphia Opera House was built over the course of just a few months in 1908 by impresario Oscar Hammerstein I. The house was initially the home of Hammerstein's opera company, the Philadelphia Opera Company, but was sold to the Metropolitan Opera of New York City in 1910, when it was renamed the Metropolitan Opera House. The Metropolitan Opera's association with the city of Philadelphia began during its first season, presenting its entire repertoire in the city during January and August 1884. The company's first Philadelphia performance was of Faust (with Christina Nilsson) on January 14, 1884, at the Chestnut Street Opera House. The Met continued to perform annually in Philadelphia for nearly eighty years, taking the entire company to the city on selected Tuesday nights throughout the opera season. With the exception of ten years spent performing in Hammerstein's opera house, the Met mostly performed at the Academy of Music. In 1961 the Met's regular visits ceased after having given close to 900 performances in Philadelphia.

Since the end of World War I, many local opera companies have operated in Philadelphia. The Pennsylvania Grand Opera Company and the Philadelphia Civic Opera Company were two companies active up until the Wall Street Crash of 1929 forced them to close their doors. The Philadelphia Grand Opera Company was the name of four different American opera companies active at the Academy of Music during the 20th century. The last and most well known of the four was founded in November 1954 with the merger of the Philadelphia Civic Grand Opera Company and the Philadelphia La Scala Opera Company. That company in turn merged with the Philadelphia Lyric Opera Company in 1975 to form the city's only current producer of grand opera, the Opera Company of Philadelphia. Of the three earlier companies, only one lasted beyond one season; a company founded in 1926 which later became associated with the Curtis Institute of Music in 1929. That company closed its doors in 1932 due to financial reasons during the Great Depression. The city's music schools also regularly produce operas, and the American Music Theater Festival occasionally presents contemporary operas.

==== Curtis Institute of Music ====
Also in the realm of serious music was the founding in 1924 of the classical conservatory, the Curtis Institute of Music, by Mary Louise Curtis Bok, daughter of Curtis Publishing Company founder Cyrus H.K. Curtis. Curtis has trained some of the world's best-known composers and musicians, including Samuel Barber, Gian Carlo Menotti, Leonard Bernstein, and pianists Abbey Simon, Walter Hautzig, Richard Goode, Susan Starr, and Peter Serkin as well as current international performers including David Hayes, Juan Diego Flórez, Alan Gilbert, Hilary Hahn, Lang Lang and Vinson Cole. Currently well-known composers who are Curtis graduates include Daron Hagen and present day faculty member Jennifer Higdon. Other famous faculty members at Curtis over the years include pianists Jozef Hofmann, Rudolf Serkin, Gary Graffman and Mieczyslaw Horszowski, singers Margaret Harshaw, Eufemia Giannini Gregory, Charles Kullman, Richard Lewis, violinist Efrem Zimbalist, and composers George Frederick Boyle and Randall Thompson.

==== Chamber music ====
Philadelphia has also had an active chamber music scene. One of the most prominent professional groups in the early 20th century was the Curtis String Quartet (1932–81). The members were graduates of the Curtis Institute, and the quartet travelled widely and made many recordings. The Philadelphia String Quartet, made up of members of the Philadelphia Orchestra, was formed in 1959 and in 1967 became the quartet-in-residence at University of Washington. Members of the Philadelphia Orchestra frequently give chamber music concerts. The Concerto Soloists, founded in 1964 by Marc Mostovoy, were the city's principal professional chamber orchestra, succeeded and reorganized as the Chamber Orchestra of Philadelphia. The Philadelphia Chamber Music Society, established in 1986, brings prominent chamber groups and soloists to the city.

==== Choral music ====
Several notable local choruses existed in the city during the 20th century. The Philadelphia Choral Society (1897–1946), conducted by Henry Gordon Thunder, was the city's major chorus for many years. Other former choruses include The Treble Clef Club (1884–1934), the Palestrina Choir (1915–48), the Accademia dei Dilettanti di Musica (1928–60), the Pennsylvania Pro Musica (1972–2020). Still flourishing are Mendelssohn Club of Philadelphia (1874), Singing City (1947), the Philadelphia Choral Arts Society (1982) and VoxAmaDeus (1989). The Philadelphia Singers, founded in 1971, was the city's principal professional choir under the direction of David Hayes, but disbanded in 2015. The Philadelphia Boys Choir & Chorale is the city's premier boys choir since 1968.

==== Popular music ====
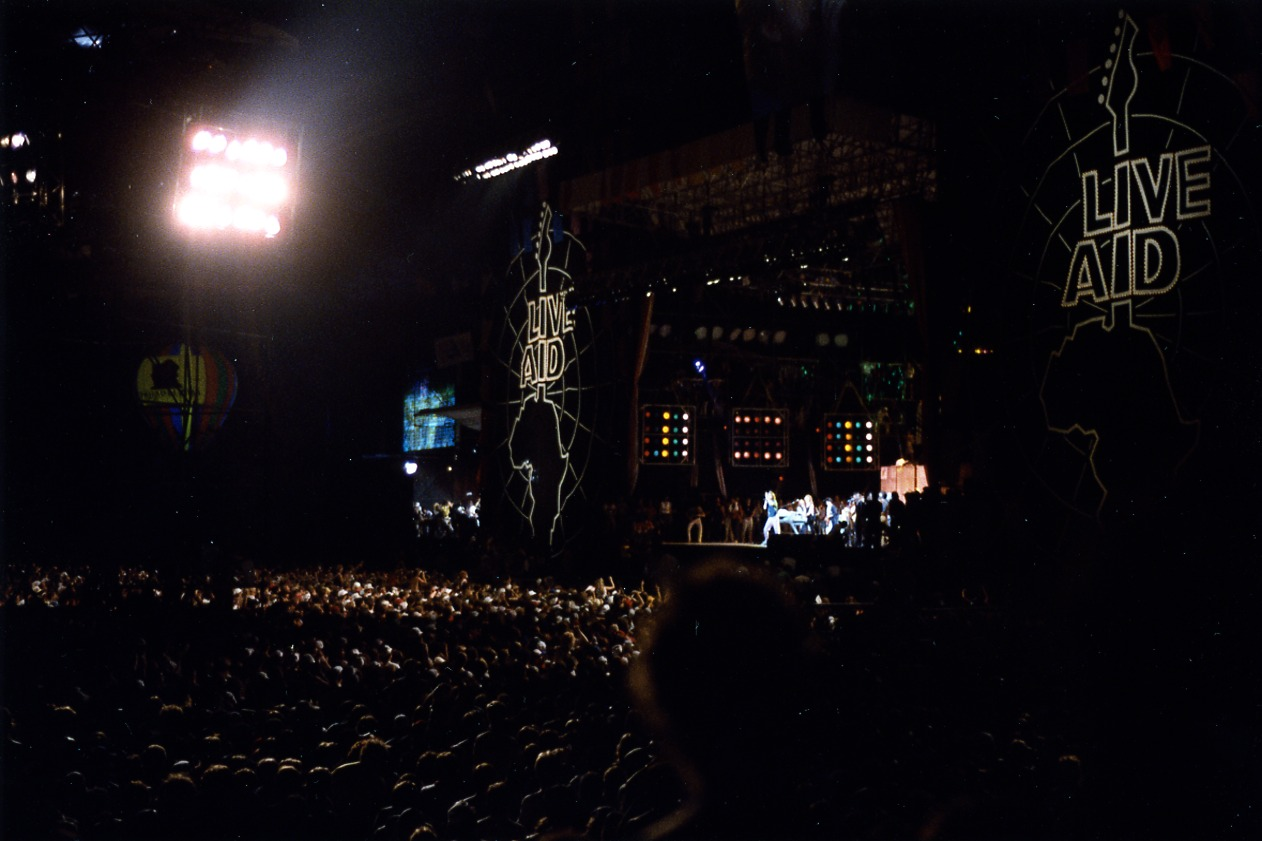
Live Aid, including a reunion of the three living original members of Led Zeppelin under the lights at John F. Kennedy Stadium on July 13, 1985

Philadelphia also produced innovative performers in fields as varied as pop, punk rock, soul and jazz. As Chuck Berry and Buddy Holly were creating rock and roll during the middle 1950s, Philadelphia—then experiencing a citywide cultural and political renaissance led by Mayors Joseph S. Clark and Richardson Dilworth and chief city planner Edmund Bacon—began in 1956 to host the national television show that would prove to transform popular music in America and around the world by bringing rock and roll brightest stars to West Philadelphia to accompany Philadelphia school kids as they danced after school at 46th and Market Streets--"American Bandstand" with host Dick Clark. The city spawned some of early rock's best-known vocalists during the fifties and early sixties, including Chubby Checker, Frankie Avalon, Jimmy Darren, Mario Lanza, Fabian Forte, and Bobby Rydell. This period was explored to some extent in a network television drama set in South Philadelphia, American Dreams.

Philadelphia's jazz heritage is noteworthy, especially as the city that John Coltrane moved to after graduation, one of the most innovative performers of the 20th century. The Philly soul sound of the 1970s was also an especially important part of the national musical consciousness of its era.

==== Punk rock ====
The city also has a distinguished history with local indie rock and punk. Punk band Pure Hell formed in the 1970s. The 1980s saw a local New Wave scene with bands like Johnny's Dance Band (JDB), alongside hardcore punk bands like Sadistic Exploits. The 90s indie rock scene found greater national popularity through the bands Dead Milkmen and Zen Guerrilla, The Dead Milkmen would go on to lead the charge in a satire punk era on MTV during the late 80's, while the city also produced an electronic music scene, known for acts like Dieselboy and Josh Wink.

==== Gospel ====
Philadelphia's gospel heritage stretches back to Charles Albert Tindley, a local reverend, who composed many important hymns. Tindley's "I Do, Don't You" inspired the composer Thomas A. Dorsey, who credited Tindley with the innovation of gospel music. Tindley composed most of his works between 1901 and 1906, and was known for his booming preaching style.

Philadelphia has produced a number of popular gospel acts, most famously the singer Clara Ward. Ward rose to fame after a performance at the National Baptist Convention in Philadelphia in 1943. Ward formed a group with several other local singers, and toured widely throughout the decade; the Clara Ward Singers were known for bringing a sense of style and glamour to the emerging gospel music industry.

The Dixie Hummingbirds are also one of Philadelphia's most famous International Quartet Groups, who are still performing today.

Since early in the 1920s this group has remained :"The Gentlemen of Song", with their signature White Tails Suits and harmony, they are still relevant in the 21st century.

==== Irish music ====
Philadelphia became home to a large community of Irish immigrants in the 1840s, and then continually through the later 19th and 20th centuries. These immigrants brought with them many styles of traditional Irish music, such as jigs and reels. Beginning in the late 1940s, Philadelphia's Irish music scene grew rapidly, spurred in part by the broadcasting of live music by Austin Kelly and the All-Ireland Irish Orchestra by the WTEL radio station.

Modern Philadelphia has contributed a number of important performers of Irish music, most famously Mick Moloney, John Vesey, Kevin McGillian, and Séamus Egan, each of whom were part of a nationwide resurgence of interest in traditional Irish-American music. In Philadelphia, this revival of traditional music built on the work of earlier pioneers like Ed Reavy, a composer who began working in the 1930s.

Philadelphia's most famous contribution to Irish traditional music is Mick Moloney. Moloney was from County Limerick, and was a musician both in Limerick and in Dublin, playing the banjo and singing; he was also a member of the popular folk group The Johnstons. Having emigrated to Philadelphia in 1973, Moloney has lectured widely on Irish culture and music and founded the organization Green Fields of America, which promotes Irish-American music. Egan is a multi-instrumentalist originally from Philadelphia, though he moved back to County Mayo as a young man, and has there become a prominent musician. He is co-founder of the Irish music band Solas, and he co-wrote Sarah McLachlan's hit song "I Will Remember You", featured in the soundtrack for the film The Brothers McMullen, for which Egan also provided the score.

==== Roman Catholic church music ====
Albert Rosewig had become a prominent local reverend and musical arranger in the late 19th century, known for a modern style that adapted elements of Western classical music. In 1903, however, Pope Pius X issued an edict (Motu Proprio), which was intended to reform and restore church music to a more traditional style. To that end, local composer, conductor and publisher Nicola Montani led the reform, which restricted musical style and instrumentation, and encouraged the use of polyphony, Latin and restored Gregorian chant. He was not the only noted local liturgical composer, however, as M. Immaculée, music director of Immaculata College, was also a well-known composer; she was noted as a composer of choral works, and also promoted liturgical music, and female composers, in the Philadelphia area.

Montani was from New York, but became prominent in Philadelphia as an editor for liturgical music at local publishers, and music director at several Philadelphia Catholic high schools. By the 1920s, he had grown in stature, forming the Society of St. Gregory and the Palestrina Choir, which helped to bring attention to Renaissance polyphony and publishing the Catholic Choirmaster, a magazine. Montani also created a list of music that did and did not meet the standards put forth by Motu Proprio, in the process banning or altering well-known works by composers ranging from Franz Schubert and Gioacchino Rossini to Joseph Haydn and Wolfgang Amadeus Mozart.

Montani's St. Gregory Hymnal was used throughout Philadelphia-area Catholic churches until after the Second Vatican Council. Some modern churches in the city use instruments ranging from electric organs and guitars to keyboards, saxophones and marimbas. The International Eucharistic Congress was held in Philadelphia in 1976, commissioning a new hymn entitled, "Gift of Finest Wheat", whose use has become widespread. In 1979, Pope John Paul II visited Philadelphia and celebrated a public outdoor mass for 1.2 million on the Benjamin Franklin Parkway on October 3, 1979. For that visit, a mass choir was formed and led by Dr. Peter LaManna which continued existence as the Archdiocesan Choir of Philadelphia.

==== Jazz ====
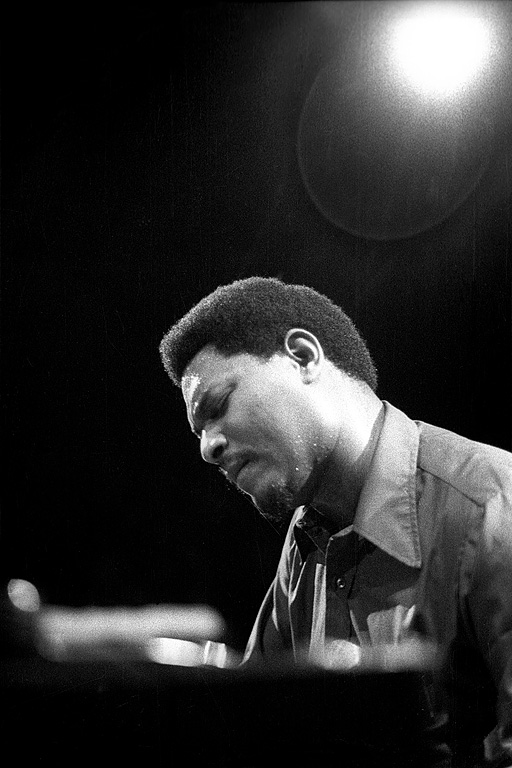
Philadelphia jazz pianist McCoy Tyner in 1973

Philadelphia developed an early jazz scene, beginning with Ethel Waters, a singer from nearby Chester, Pennsylvania, who was the first star for Black Swan Records. The Standard Theatre and Dunbar Theatre, later renamed the Lincoln Theater, were important venues for jazz in the early 20th century, when most major performers stopped in Philadelphia, Baltimore, Washington, D.C., and New York City. Though jazz was an African American creation coming out of Gospel and Blues, Philadelphia's multi-ethnic population was attracted to the style, and the city's Italian and Jewish neighborhoods produced several well-known jazz musicians. Two of the most important were the Italian jazz instrumentalists Eddie Lang and Joe Venuti, the latter of whom became known as the "Mad Fiddler from Philly". Others included Stan Getz, Jimmy Amadie, Robert Chudnick and Jan Savitt, who, with his band the Top Hatters, toured with George Tunnell, one of the first African American singers in the city to consistently sing with a major white band. The city's early 20th century mainstream dance scene was led by the bandleader Howard Lanin, whose band performed popular showtunes, waltzes and light jazz.

Philadelphia's African American population grew greatly as a result of immigration from the south during World War 2, when future luminaries like the Heath Brothers, Dizzy Gillespie and John Coltrane moved to Philadelphia from the Carolinas. Philadelphia's mid-20th century jazz heritage includes an important role in the development of bebop, a style most closely associated with New York. In the 1940s, Philadelphia jazz was based out of clubs along Columbia Avenue in North Philadelphia and clubs like the Clef Club, the Showboat, and Pep's in South Philadelphia.

The city produced a number of bop-era saxophonists, the most famous of whom was John Coltrane, one of the most renowned jazz musicians of the 20th century, known for an "active, vigorous, emotionally charged style". The city also produced Charlie Biddle, Clifford Brown, Ray Bryant, Tommy Bryant, Kenny Dennis, Jimmy Oliver, Catalyst, Philly Joe Jones, Al Grey, Reggie Workman, Red Rodney, Jimmy Smith, Hank Mobley, Billy Root, Specs Wright, Jerry Thomas, Wilbur Ware, Hasaan Ibn Ali, Clarence Sharpe, John Dennis, Walt Dickerson, Johnny Coles, Lee Morgan, Cal Massey, Benny Golson, Odean Pope, Bill Barron, Kenny Barron, Arthur Harper, Jymie Merritt, Henry Grimes, Leon Grimes, Jimmy Garrison, Colmar Duncan, Sherman Ferguson, McCoy Tyner, Kenny Rodgers, D.B. Shrier, Mickey Roker, Donald Bailey, Victor Bailey, Thornel Schwartz, Bootsie Barnes, Bobby Timmons, Spanky DeBrest, Sam Dockery, Wayne Dockery, Richard Grossman, Sonny Fortune, Tyrone Brown, Charles Fambrough, Gerald Veasley, Earl Grubbs, Carl Grubbs, Sam Reed, Tom Darnell, Jimmy Vass, Archie Shepp, Sunny Murray, Rashied Ali, and Buddy Delco. And home grown, 20th and Columbia Ave's own, trumpeter Cullen Knight, Jr.

In 1970, Philadelphia became the home of Sun Ra's band, which helped lay the groundwork for the 1980s scene, which locally produced Grover Washington, Jr. and Stanley Clarke. The 1990s local jazz scene continued to thrive with artists like Tim Warfield, Terell Stafford, Jamaaladeen Tacuma, Mark Kramer, Uri Caine, Christian McBride, Joey DeFrancesco, Orrin Evans, Ben Schachter, Eddie Green, Suzanne Cloud, Tyrone Brown, Jim Miller, Larry McKenna, Mike Boone, and Byron Landham.

The city has a thriving jazz radio station in WRTI, sponsored by Temple University. Its hosts include such notables as Bob Perkins, Jeff Duperon, and Harrison Ridley Jr. Peco Energy Jazz Festival is held each February.

==== 1950s pop ====
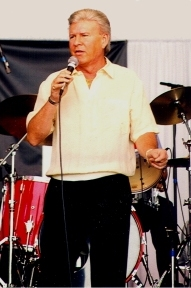
Philadelphia's Bobby Rydell in 1998

Philadelphia's first major contribution to mainstream American pop music was the television show American Bandstand, hosted by Dick Clark. The show featured music and dancing teenagers and became an enduring feature of American music and television, groundbreaking in its broadcasting of rock and roll in the mid-1950s., Unterberger also points to many later imitators as evidence of American Bandstand's legacy: Soul Train and the Saturday Night Live parody Sprockets. PCVB regards American Bandstand as an "institution in American pop culture". Clark, as the show's host, became a leading American music producer and the show brought attention to Philadelphia's music scene, facilitating the rise of local labels like Swan Records, Cameo-Parkway and Chancellor Records. This system produced pop stars including Fabian, Bobby Rydell and Frankie Avalon. A payola scandal threatened the show and Clark at one point but subsequent congressional hearings cleared the music mogul of wrongdoing. Nevertheless, the show moved to Los Angeles in 1963 and Philadelphia's pop output began to wane.

Philadelphia's 1950s-era musical output included the rock pioneer Bill Haley from Chester, Pennsylvania, and the rockabilly musician Charlie Gracie. Philadelphia also had a vibrant R&B and soul scene, including most influentially the label Cameo-Parkway, which was responsible for some 1950s R&B dance hits beginning with Chubby Checker's "The Twist". Cameo-Parkway followed with a series of other dance-themed novelty songs like "The Wah-Watusi" by The Orlons, "Mashed Potato Time" by Dee Dee Sharp and "The Bristol Stomp" by The Dovells.

Philadelphia's famous 1950s performers also included Danny & the Juniors, a doo wop group. They were among the first of Philadelphia's doo wop musicians to gain national success. Doo wop was a style of a cappella vocal music associated with many cities of the urban East Coast, especially Philadelphia, New York, New Jersey and Baltimore. Anthony and the Sophomores, another Philadelphia doo wop group, emerged in the 1960s.

Beginning in the late 1950s, when he came to fame as a dancer on American Bandstand, the influential dj and media personality Jerry Blavat was a major force in promoting Philadelphia's music, particularly that of Black artists, until his death in 2023.

==== Philly soul ====
In the 1960s, Philadelphia soul began to develop its own sound, drawing from the girl group sound with "strong pop melodies and brassy, upbeat production (without as much use of) interactive harmonies", while other performers, like the funky Howard Tate and Solomon Burke adopted a more Southern soul-style sound. Major girl group-oriented acts included Brenda & the Tabulations, with their string-dominated doo wop hit "Dry Your Eyes", Barbara Mason's sultry vocals on "Yes, I'm Ready" and Claudine Clark's "raucous" sound.

R&B and soul-oriented indie labels in the 1960s included Phil-LA and Arctic Records, where the songwriting and producing team of Kenny Gamble and Leon Huff began their careers. Gamble and Huff were architects of the Philadelphia sound in soul music, beginning with their 1967 hit for The Soul Survivors' "Expressway to Your Heart". Their signature sound was sentimental and romantic, and began to develop with The Intruders, a long-running pop act. Jerry Butler became an increasingly important performer later in the decade, as Gamble and Huff experimented with a lush, orchestral sound produced by large ensembles of strings, bells and horns. The effect was a "funky" style, "more removed from earlier soul's R&B and blues roots", and "reminiscent of Motown in its attention to detail and hooks, but was much more lightweight". Though Gamble and Huff were the most renowned producers of the Philly soul scene, the area also produced Thom Bell, who worked with The Delfonics, The Stylistics and The Spinners on a more classical influenced style.

In the early 1970s, Philly soul broke through with its most popular recordings of the era. Gamble and Huff's Philadelphia International label started the trend after signing a distribution agreement with CBS. The O'Jays became the first major act under this arrangement, and became known for a grittier lyrical feel, established on the hit "Back Stabbers", which had a socially conscious focus on inner-city life. The O'Jays were followed by the more romantic Harold Melvin & the Blue Notes, which produced the future solo vocalist Teddy Pendergrass. Philadelphia International also released Billy Paul, Three Degrees, MFSB, Bunny Siglar, Dexter Wansel, Anthony White, and The Ebonys.

By the early 1980s, Philadelphia soul had declined greatly in popularity. Audiences continued to embrace disco, with groups such as The Trammps and Sister Sledge leading the way. Drummer Earl Young had codified the beat itself, with a distinct hi-hat pattern. Another one of Philadelphia's major contributions was the local veteran Patti LaBelle, who became a major pop singer. The city remained important musically, giving rise to widely popular local blue-eyed soul duo Hall & Oates among many more.

=== Rock music ===
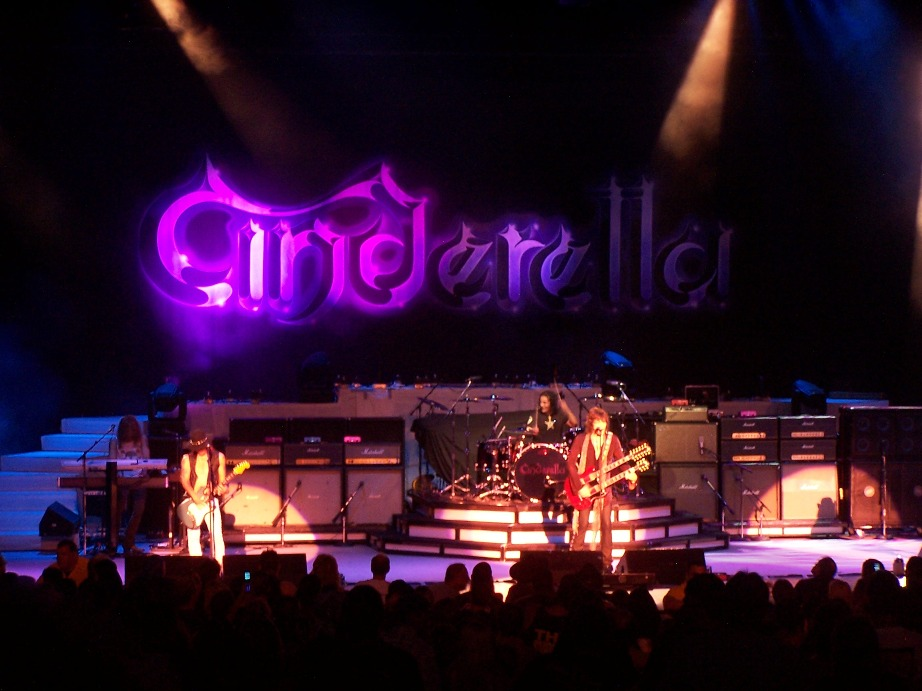
Philadelphia rock band Cinderella in August 2006

In the late 20th century and early 21st century, Philadelphia's local music scene produced a number of respected performers from a variety of fields, including jazz, R&B, rock, hip hop, and dancehall. The city's most historically important contribution to popular music since the 1980s was a major part in the early evolution of East Coast hip hop, a style based out of New York City.

=== Hardcore punk ===
Grindcore, industrial music, and hardcore punk are also a part of Philadelphia's modern music scene, built around labels like Relapse and Dancing Ferret, respectively. Recently, the band Soul Glo has been taking punk and hardcore in a new direction.

=== Classical music ===
Philadelphia has a thriving classical music scene. Many orchestras, choral groups, chamber groups, and new music ensembles call it home. Several famous and successful composers live in Philadelphia, including Jennifer Higdon.

=== Electronic music ===
Philadelphia has a diverse DJ scene of electronic dance music, based in an area sometimes called Vinyl Row on 4th Street. Most major events and parties are advertised in this area, and in a column by Sean O'Neal called DJ Nights in the Philadelphia City Paper. DJ clubs include Fluid, Shampoo and Transit, while the city's most prominent DJs include Rob Paine, Tom Colontonio, Willyum, Bryon Stout, LickAshot, Roland Riso, Sat-One, DJ Smoove, and Robbie Tronco.

Philadelphia's electronic music scene includes DJs who play house, techno and other styles, but the city is particularly known for the techstep style of drum and bass, and is home to perhaps the country's most popular DJ of that style, Dieselboy. The most important drum and bass nightclub in Philadelphia was Club Skyline, which closed in the late 1990s and is now a parking lot, and local performers include Jordana LeSesne, Karl K and MC Dub 2. The composer Joseph Hallman is also an avid remixer/producer and works primarily in Philadelphia.

Some of Philadelphia's current event companies produce many special events throughout the year. Sundae gained notability by their "Sundae" parties, which have recently started a moving Monday called "Rover" that isits different venues. Worship produces the long-running house monthly "Shakedown", which features at least two visits a year from Josh Wink. In 2010, Bryon Stout launched Philadelphia's first successful house music internet radio station, Deephouselounge.com. The station streams 24/7 around the world with live broadcasts daily.

=== Hip-hop ===
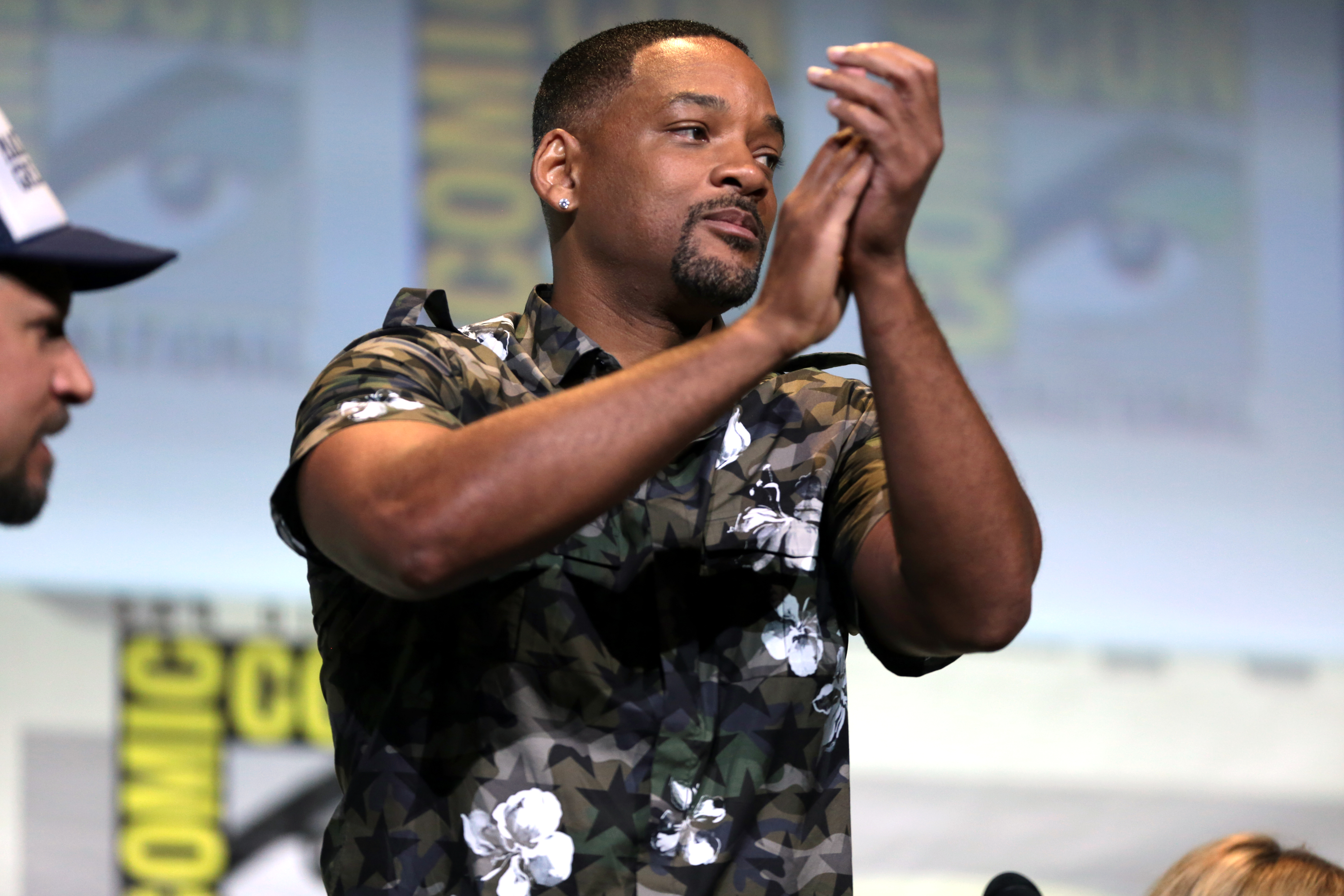
Philadelphia rapper Will Smith in July 2016

The first major pop hip-hop acts from Philadelphia were Will Smith and DJ Jazzy Jeff; the city also produced a number of other noted performers, like Tuff Crew, Lisa Lopes of TLC, and new jack swing group Boyz II Men. Local recorded hip-hop began in the Late 1970s, with Lady B.

It was Schoolly D, however, who first put Philadelphia on the hip-hop map and made Philadelphia "the spawning ground for a whole new direction in rap music". Often considered the first hardcore rapper and gangsta rapper, Schoolly D rose to local fame with the single "P.S.K. What Does It Mean?", which got airplay as far north as New York. He rapped about the life of a "gangsta", about living in the ghetto and dealing with poverty and crime.

Despite the fact that Philadelphia is one of the birthplaces of hardcore rap, the upbeat and party-driven Will Smith became the most visible of the early stars. However, the local scene remains vibrant, with regular performances across the city, including at Temple University's African Student Union. Some performers have achieved considerable national acclaim since Smith, however, especially The Roots, Cassidy, The Goats, Beanie Sigel, Freeway, Kurupt, Peedi Crakk, State Property, Meek Mill and Eve; the city has also produced the well-known alternative hip-hop duo Jedi Mind Tricks, Digable Planets, Princess Superstar, Bahamadia, Chiddy Bang, Spank Rock, Philadelphia Slick, Amanda Blank, Lil Dicky, PnB Rock, and Lil Uzi Vert, who worked with Philadelphia native production group Working On Dying, known for flag-shipping Tread rap, a sub-genre of hip-hop that originated in Philadelphia's underground rap scene.

=== Jamaican music ===
Philadelphia is home to the sixth-largest Jamaican population of any city in the United States. Jamaican music clubs, devoted to styles like dancehall, have become a major part of the Philadelphia nightclub scene in the early first decade of the 21st century. Clubs like Upper Deck, Genesis, Pinnacle and Reef have been mainstays of the Philadelphia dancehall scene. Many of these clubs hold dancehall contests, though there is no single such contest that is extremely famous or semi-official in the city.

=== R&B and neo soul ===
Philadelphia has been the epicenter of the neo soul movement in R&B, with such acts like Jill Scott, Jazmine Sullivan, and Musiq Soulchild. The Roots helped pave the way for an entire generation of artists that came to be known as the Soulquarians. Erykah Badu, D'Angelo and Bilal defined the sound of this movement. Pop star John Legend attended the University of Pennsylvania and was so inspired by the local music scene that he made the decision to pursue it full time.

More recently, Philadelphia has been home to a multitude of new sultry neo-soul sounds, including vocalists such as Rosa Nice, who has worked with legendary producer Pop Traxx, also known as Leon Huff Jr., together reaching the top of the Philadelphia independent music charts.

=== Indie rock ===
Rock and Roll was arguably birthed by Bill Haley and the Comets during their regular gigs at the Twin Bar in Gloucester City NJ just across the river from Philadelphia during the early 1950s. In the modern era, the city and its suburbs have since been the home of a couple of influential rock artists like Joan Jett and Taylor Swift.

The area includes critically acclaimed rock and metal bands, including A Life Once Lost, Cinderella, Circa Survive, Valencia, Varials, Sinch, Free Energy, Dead Milkmen, Hall and Oates, George Thorogood, G. Love & Special Sauce, Robert Hazard and The Heroes (Hazard wrote Cyndi Lauper's hit "Girls Just Wanna Have Fun"), The Hooters, The A's, and Todd Rundgren.

Popular rock and indie rock musicians from Philadelphia include Poison, The Bloodhound Gang, Amos Lee, Man Man, A Sunny Day in Glasgow, Bardo Pond, Norwegian Arms, The Starting Line, The Wonder Years, Dr. Dog, Steve Gunn (musician), Phil Moore Browne, National Eye, Nothing, Kurt Vile, CRUISR, The Tressels, Sun Airway, Breaking Benjamin, Halestorm, The War on Drugs, Alex G, Michelle Zauner of Japanese Breakfast, Hop Along, Algernon Cadwallader, Slaughter Beach, Dog, Beach Slang, Zonic Shockum, Clockcleaner, Modern Baseball, and Cold Cave. American musicians from popular bands, such as Clap Your Hands Say Yeah and The Walkmen are also from Philadelphia.

== See also ==
- Curtis Organ
- List of people from Philadelphia
- Wanamaker Organ
