= Jeffrey Brillhart =

American organist and conductor

Jeffrey Brillhart (born 1955) is an American organist, improviser, and conductor. He has served as director of music and fine arts at Bryn Mawr Presbyterian Church since January 1983. He is music director of Philadelphia's Singing City Choir, one of the first racially and religiously integrated symphonic choirs in America. He teaches organ improvisation at Yale University. He first gained national recognition for his abilities in organ improvisation after winning the 1994 National Competition in Organ Improvisation, sponsored by the American Guild of Organists.

== Life ==
He earned his MM from the Eastman School of Music, where he studied organ with Russell Saunders and piano with Barbara Lister Sink. A native Iowan, Brillhart has served as director of music and fine arts at the Bryn Mawr Presbyterian Church since January 1983. His responsibilities at Bryn Mawr Church include directing the Senior Choir and Bryn Mawr Chamber Singers; oversight of the Vespers Series; oversight of all children and youth choirs; the West Philadelphia Children's Choir, and the church's arts outreach and visual arts ministries. He is the church's principal organist.

In June 1999, Brillhart was appointed the fourth music director of Singing City, having served as associate director in the 1998–99 season, when he worked closely with then Music Director Joseph Flummerfelt. As music director, Brillhart provides artistic leadership for a rich program of concerts, educational instruction in local schools, and outreach to diverse communities. He directs the choir and oversees all aspects of Singing City's musical initiatives. During his tenure with Singing City the choir has traveled to Cuba, Northern Ireland and the Republic of Ireland, presented more than one hundred-fifty concerts, performed with the Philadelphia Orchestra and the Chamber Orchestra of Philadelphia, and worked with such internationally renowned artists as Helmuth Rilling, Dave Brubeck, Nick Page, Moses Hogan, Andre Thomas, Anton Armstrong, and Weston Noble, and Rossen Milanov. His organ, teaching, and conducting engagements have taken him throughout America, Europe and South America, with engagements in Paris, Philadelphia, San Diego, Seattle, Birmingham, Alabama, Waco, Chicago, Pittsburgh, New York City, Iowa City, Des Moines, Walla Walla, and Worcester, Massachusetts. In May 2006, he made his Philadelphia Symphony debut in one of the inaugural concerts of the new Dobson Organ in Kimmel Center.

In May 2005, he was appointed lecturer in organ improvisation at Yale University. His textbook, Breaking Free: finding a personal language for organ improvisation through 20th-century French improvisation techniques, is published by Wayne Leupold Editions. His second textbook, "A World of Possibilities: Master Lessons in Organ Improvisation" was published in July 2018 by Wayne Leupold Editions.
