= Brillhart =

Brillhart is a surname. Notable people with the surname include:

- Jeffrey Brillhart (born 1955), American organist, improviser, and conductor
- Jessica Brillhart, American immersive director, writer and theorist
- John Brillhart (1930–2022), American mathematician
