= Montani =

Montani may refer to:

- The Italian surname Montani, borne by Nicola Montani
- The Epanterii Montani, an ancient Ligurian people
