= Benita Valente =

American opera singer (1934–2025)

- Valente in the 1970s
- Born: October 19, 1934; Delano, California, U.S.
- Died: October 24, 2025 (aged 91); Philadelphia, Pennsylvania, U.S.
- Occupations: Operatic soprano; Music pedagogue
- Years active: 1958–2000
- Spouse: Anthony Checchia

Benita Valente (October 19, 1934 – October 24, 2025) was an American soprano in opera, lieder, chamber music and oratorio. She appeared at the Metropolitan Opera in New York City from 1973 through 1992, as Almirena in Handel's Rinaldo, as Mozart's Pamina, Susanna and Ilia, and Verdi's Gilda and Nanetta. She performed and recorded a broad repertoire of lieder, and was particularly interested in contemporary music; several composers wrote music for her. She performed with the Juilliard String Quartet Schoenberg's String Quartet No. 2, earning a 1978 Grammy Award, and Alberto Ginastera's Third String Quartett, written for her. John Rockwell from The New York Times wrote about her in a 1983 recital review: "as gifted a singer as we have today, worldwide".

== Life and career ==
Valente was born in Delano, California, on October 19, 1934, to an Italian father and a Swiss mother. A high-school teacher noticed her talent and recommended lessons with Lotte Lehmann in Santa Barbara. She studied voice further at the Curtis Institute of Music in Philadelphia with Martial Singher and later with Margaret Harshaw, where she graduated in 1960. In 1958, she won a student competition of the Philadelphia Orchestra which earned her a concert with the orchestra. She won the Metropolitan Opera National Council Auditions in 1960, and first performed at the Marlboro Music Festival with pianist Rudolf Serkin, among others. She appeared with the Philadelphia Orchestra around 60 times.

=== Opera ===
Valente began her operatic career in Germany, making her debut on stage at the Theater Freiburg as Pamina in Mozart's Die Zauberflöte in 1962. She remained with the company for a year. She was a member of the Staatstheater Nürnberg in 1966/67. She appeared as a guest at the Opernhaus Dortmund, Zürich, the Strasbourg Opera House, the Dutch National Opera and at the Festival dei Due Mondi in Spoleto.

She performed in the United States at the Boston Opera and Baltimore Opera. She made her debut with the Metropolitan Opera in New York City on September 22, 1973, again as Pamina, directed by Günther Rennert and conducted by Peter Maag. She became a regular there, performing 74 times in roles including Almirena in Handel's Rinaldo, a great success in 1984, Mozart's Susanna in The Marriage of Figaro and Ilia in Idomeneo, and Verdi's Gilda in Rigoletto and Nanetta in Falstaff. She appeared at the Santa Fé Opera in 1987 as Ginevra in Handel's Ariodante, and at the Michigan Opera as the Countess in Le nozze di Figaro in 1889. In 1990, she performed as Euridice in Gluck's Orfeo ed Euridice at Santa Fé and the Los Angeles Opera, at the Philadelphia Opera as Ginevra in Ariodante, and at the Vancouver Opera as Handel's Alcina. She took part in the concert world premiere of Vanqui by Leslie Burrs in Columbus, Ohio on February 27, 1999, singing the double role of Garner and Moremi. In the first staged production of the opera at the Columbus Opera on October 15, 1999, she created the role of Melody Cardwell. She retired from the stage in 2000.

=== Concerts ===
As a chamber performer, she collaborated with the Guarneri, Juilliard and Orion String Quartets. She performed with numerous instrumentalists, including cellist Yo-Yo Ma, clarinetist Richard Stoltzman, and pianists Emanuel Ax, Leon Fleisher and Richard Goode.

Valente was in 1969, 1976 and 1978 a soloist with the Naumburg Orchestral Concerts in their summer series at the Naumburg Bandshell in Central Park. In 1971 and 1972, she performed on tour alongside modern dancer Mimi Kagan in Earl Kim's work Exercises en Route.

She often performed contemporary music; composers including William Bolcom, Alberto Ginastera, John Harbison, Libby Larsen and Richard Wernick wrote music for her. She performed in the 1981 world premiere of David Del Tredici's All in the Golden Afternoon from Child Alice with the Philadelphia Orchestra, conducted by Eugene Ormandy.

=== Teaching ===
Valente taught vocal master classes, at the Marlboro Music School, in the Cincinnati Conservatory program in Lucca, Italy, at the European Mozart Academy in Poland, in the Metropolitan Opera's Lindemann Young Artists Development Program, at Stearns Institute for Young Artists at Ravinia, in the young artist program of the National Arts Centre's Summer Music Institute in Ottawa, and at Temple University, among others.

=== Personal life and death ===
Valente met her husband Anthony Checchia at Marlboro in 1958. They married in 1959 and lived in Philadelphia. He was a bassoonist, the founder and artistic director of the Philadelphia Chamber Music Society and administrator for the Marlboro Music School and Festival. Their son, Pete Checchia, became a photographer and artist.

Valente died on October 24, 2025, in Philadelphia, at the age of 91.

== Recordings ==
Valente recorded lieder by Haydn, Mozart, Schubert, Schumann, Brahms, Strauss and Wolf, among others, with several labels.

- Beethoven: Ninth Symphony, Pro Arte
- William Bolcom: Briefly It Enters and Let Evening Come, Centaur Records
- Brahms: Liebeslieder Waltzes, Op. 52 (Sony Classical/SME SK 48176)
- Dallapiccola: Parole di San Paolo, Fono-Candide
- Haydn: Nelson Mass, HMV
- Haydn: La Canterina, MRF
- Libby Larsen: Songs From Letters From Calamity Jane to Her Daughter Janey and Songs of Light and Love, Scottish Chamber Orchestra, Joel Revzen cond., Koch International
- Liszt: Christus, RCA Records
- Mahler: Second Symphony, Conifer/BMG
- Schoenberg: Die glückliche Hand, Sony
- Schubert: Der Hirte auf dem Felsen, with pianist Rudolf Serkin and clarinetist Harold Wright, Sony (SME SK 48176)

She recorded string quartets with the Juilliard String Quartet (Bridge Records), including:

- John Harbison: The Rewaking
- Haydn: Die sieben letzten Worte unseres Erlösers am Kreuze, Sony
- Alberto Ginastera: String Quartet No. 3
- Schoenberg: String Quartet No. 2
- Richard Wernick: String Quartet No. 5

== Awards ==
Valente received a 1978 Grammy Award for her recording of Schoenberg's String Quartet No. 2 and a Grammy nomination for her recording of Haydn's Die sieben letzten Worte unseres Erlösers am Kreuze. In 1999 she was the recipient of the Richard J. Bogomolny National Service Award from Chamber Music America for her contributions to chamber music, as the first vocalist among the recipients over 20 years. She received an honorary doctorate from the Curtis Institute in 2000.
