= Stephen P. Anderson =

American musician, songwriter and expressionist painter

- Also known as: Stephen P. Anderson
- Born: Stephen Patrick Anderson; 1967 (age 58–59); Elkton, Maryland
- Origin: Philadelphia, Pennsylvania
- Genres: Alternative rock, gothic rock, expressionism
- Instruments: Guitar, bass, piano, vocal
- Label: Beef Eater
- Website: spanderson.com

Stephen P. Anderson (born 1967) is an American musician, songwriter and expressionist painter.

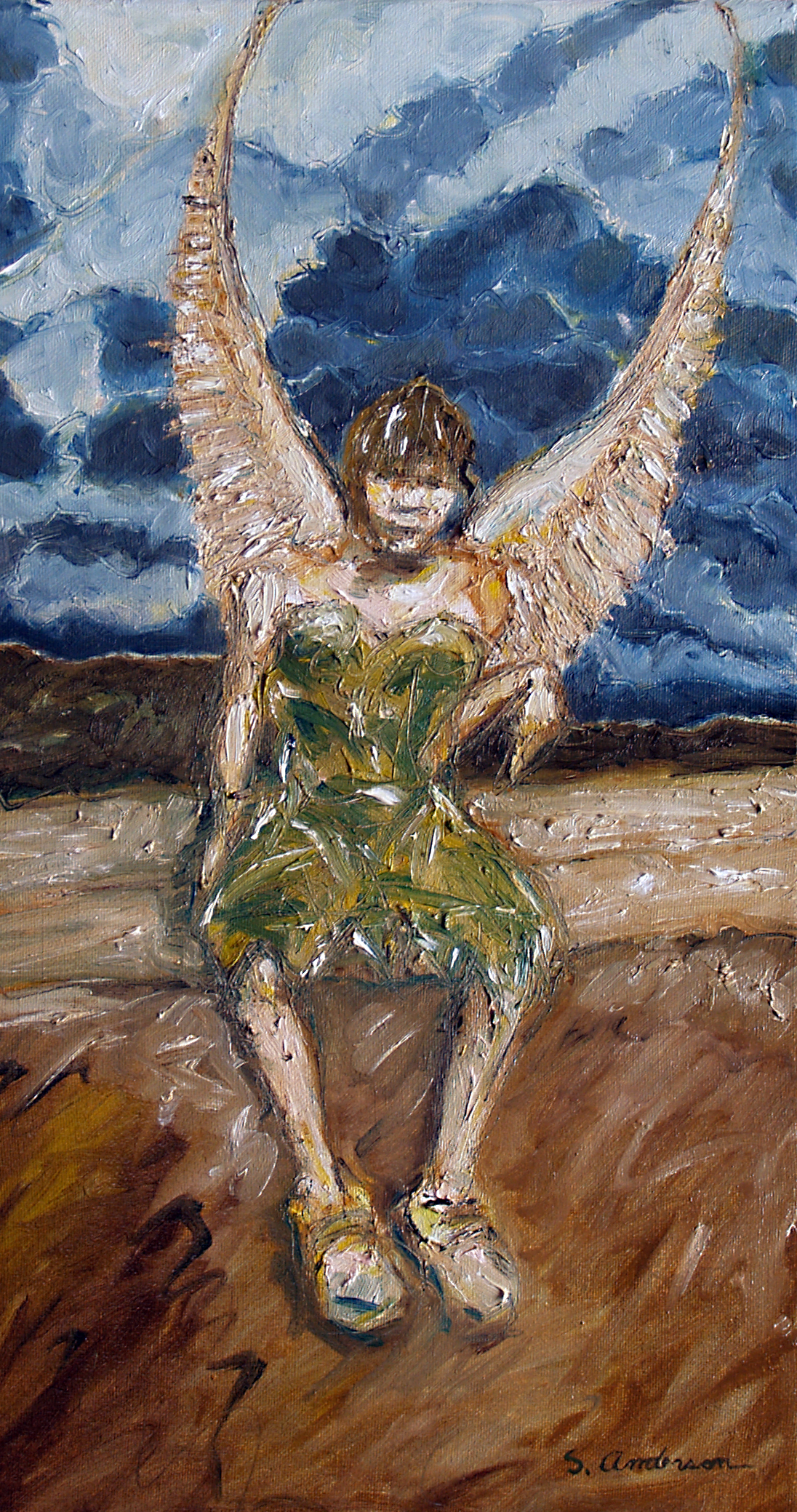
"Winged Girl" by S.P. Anderson

== Discography ==
=== Albums ===
- Zonic Shockum (Zonic Shockum) 1997 Stain Music STM-009
- Blackbirds Over Lancaster (solo) 2007 Beef Eater Records BE-012
- Noisy Troubadour – Home Recordings from 1988–2008 (solo) 2008 Beef Eater Records BE-013
- Sessions 1989-1995 (Zonic Shockum) 2013 Beef Eater Records BE-014

=== EPs ===
- Testosterone (Zonic Shockum)1992 Compulsiv CPS 004
- Electrocarnivorous (Bladder Control) 1993 Beef Eater Records BE-002
- Here Today... (Zonic Shockum) 2001 Stain Music Stm-011

=== Podcasts ===
- Local Support 066 (2008)

=== Soundtracks ===
- "The Wedding Song" recording by Zonic Shockum featured in Go-Go Rama Mama (1997), a 16mm film by Kate McCabe
- "Opposites Attack" solo recording featured in Milk and Honey (2004), a 16mm film by Kate McCabe
