= Latin American Musicians Association =

The Latin American Musicians Association (AMLA, in Spanish Asociacion de Musicos Latino Americanos) is an organization composed of Latin musicians, based in Philadelphia, Pennsylvania. The Association's founder is Jesse Bermudez, a major figure in the Philadelphia music scene. The Association runs a Latin School of the Arts, where prominent teachers include Orlanda Fiol, Elio Villafranca and Pablo Batista.

The Association was founded in 1982 in El Barrio, near an area known as the Golden Block in North Philadelphia.
