= David Hayes (conductor) =

American conductor (born 1963)

David Hayes (born 15 May 1963 in Framingham, Massachusetts) is an American conductor.

== Biography ==
Hayes studied music at the University of Hartford, Hartt School of Music, where his teachers included Richard Rusack (viola). He graduated from the Hartt School with a Bachelor of Music degree cum laude in musicology. He continued his music studies at the Curtis Institute of Music, where his teachers included Otto-Werner Mueller and earned a diploma in orchestral conducting in 1989. In addition, he continued conducting studies with Charles Bruck at the Pierre Monteux School in Hancock, ME. Hayes has subsequently served as a staff conductor at the Curtis Institute.

Hayes became the second music director of The Philadelphia Singers in 1992. With The Philadelphia Singers, Hayes conducted numerous Philadelphia and World Premieres including works of Jennifer Higdon, Ezra Laderman, Robert Capanna, Thomas Whitman and Morton Feldman. He held the post through the 2014-2015 season as its final music director, as The Philadelphia Singers disbanded at the close of the 2014-2015 season. During this period, Hayes was also on the conducting staff of The Philadelphia Orchestra from 2001 to 2011. Hayes made his Philadelphia Orchestra conducting debut in May 2003, sharing a program with Wolfgang Sawallisch.

In 2002, Hayes became director of orchestral and conducting studies at Mannes College The New School for Music in New York City. He served as artistic advisor to The Washington Chorus during the 2007-2008 season. In July 2012, the New York Choral Society announced the appointment of Hayes as its next music director, effective with the 2012-2013 season. With the New York Choral Society, Hayes has conducted New York and world premieres, including works by Jennifer Higdon, James MacMillan and Joseph Vella. Hayes has served on the Board of Directors of Chorus America, the national service organization for choruses in the USA.

Hayes became music director of the Chamber Orchestra of Philadelphia as of the 2024-2025 season.

Cultural offices
Preceded by Michael Korn	Music Director, The Philadelphia Singers; 1992–2015	Succeeded by no successor (chorus disbanded)
Preceded by John Daly Goodwin	Music Director, New York Choral Society; 2012–present	Succeeded by incumbent
Preceded by Dirk Brossé	Music Director, Chamber Orchestra of Philadelphia; 2024–present	Succeeded by incumbent
