= Jazz on the Ave Music Festival =

Annual jazz music festival in Philadelphia, Pennsylvania

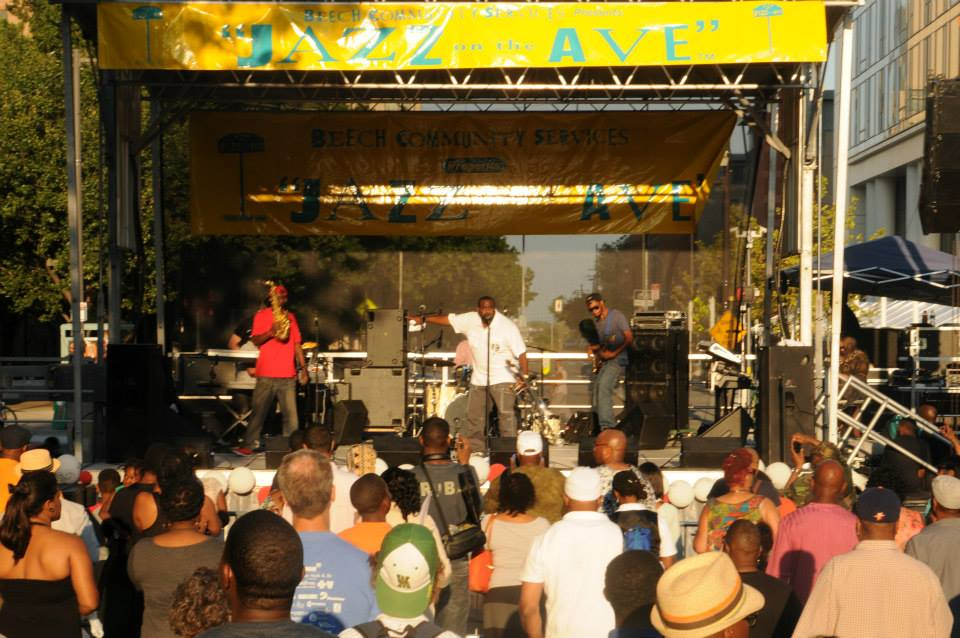
- Main stage at the Jazz on the Ave Music Festival in 2016
- Frequency: Annually
- Locations: Philadelphia, Pennsylvania, U.S.
- Country: United States
- Inaugurated: 2006
- Founder: Beech Community Services
- Most recent: 2019
- Major events: Music

The Jazz on the Ave Music Festival (commonly referred to as Jazz on the Ave) is an annual jazz music festival held on Cecil B. Moore Avenue in Philadelphia, Pennsylvania. It was founded by Beech Companies in 2006 and is organized by Beech Community Services. The event features music from genres including jazz, soul, Gospel and R&B, as well as some contemporary urban music. Across the avenue, there are two stages that continuously host live music. The main stage resides at the corner of Broad Street and Cecil B. Moore Avenue, while the Philly Soul Stock stage is located at the meeting of 17th Street and Cecil B. Moore Avenue.

== History ==
In the 1940s through the 1960s, North Philadelphia housed 16 of the city's 30 jazz venues, many of which were located on Cecil B. Moore Avenue (formerly Columbia Avenue), which gained a reputation as a center of jazz music and culture, and the nickname "Jump Street".

The Jazz on the Ave festival started in 2006, run by Beech Community Services with support from commercial partners, volunteers and local residents. The event is hosted by local radio and TV personalities. In addition to live music, the festival acts as a platform for local vendors, visual artists, independent crafts, and gastronomy.
