= National Eye =

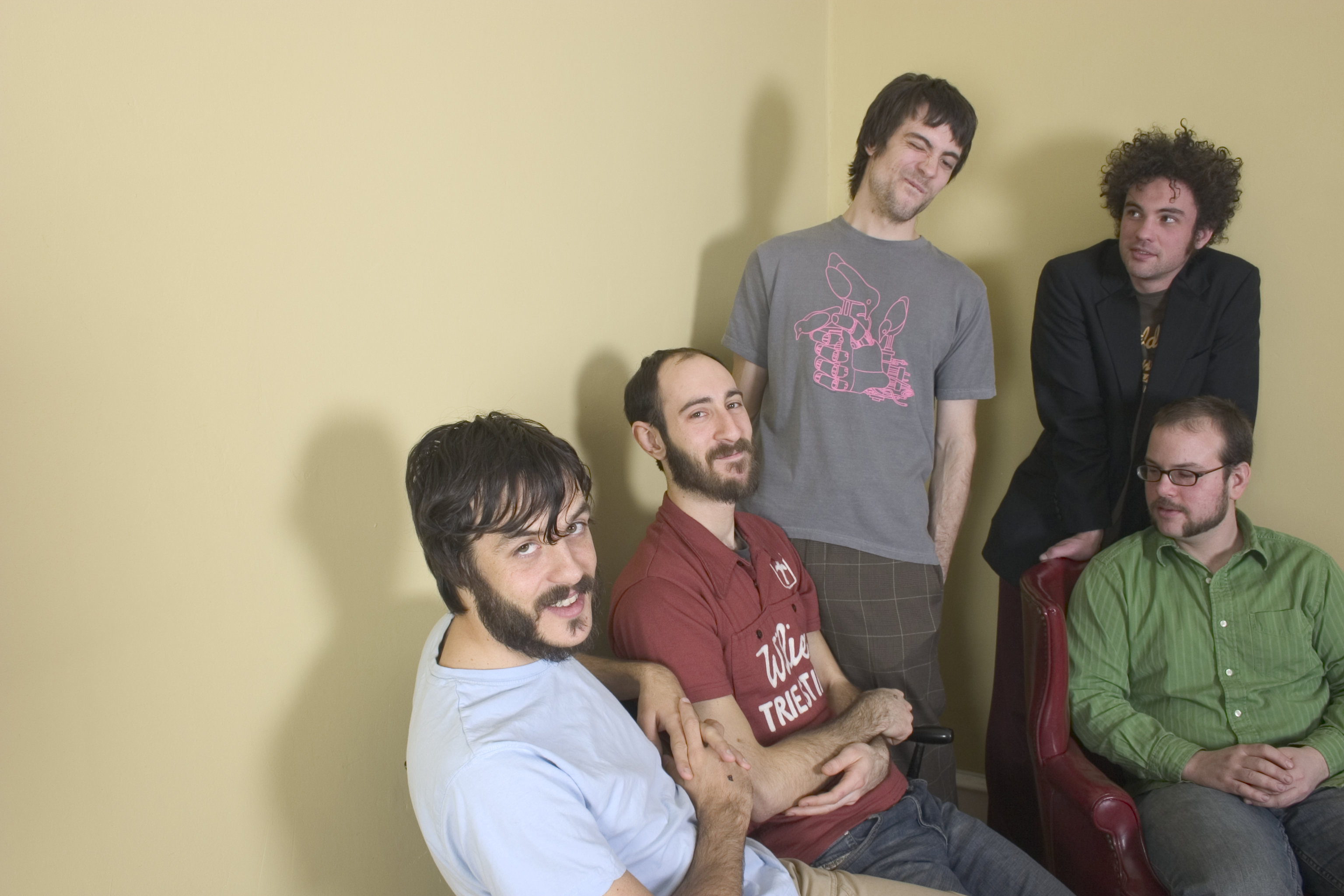
- National Eye, 2006

Background information
- Origin: Philadelphia, Pennsylvania, United States
- Genres: Psychedelic, post-rock, lo-fi
- Years active: Since 2002
- Label: Park the Van
- Members: William Baggott; Gianmarco Cilli; Richard Flom; Douglas Kirby; Jeff Love; Kyle Lloyd; Gretchen Lohse

National Eye is an American indie-rock band based in Philadelphia, Pennsylvania. They formed in 2002 from a core of five members who had met in college. Their sound has been described as psychedelic, post-rock, and lo-fi.

== Biography ==
National Eye formed out of The Project Project, a band formed in Colorado Springs, Colorado, where the members attended college. The group moved to Philadelphia in 2000, moving into one of the members' family home in Philadelphia. In 2002, the band adopted the name National Eye, as they began recording The Meter Glows. For their first two albums, National Eye adhered to a communal approach to songwriting and recording. Band members William Baggott, Gianmarco Cilli, Richard Flom, Douglas Kirby, and Jeffrey Alan Love contributed equally, in a "democratic, collective" recording philosophy. Both The Meter Glows and Roomful of Lions were mixed by Thom Monahan.

For The Farthest Shore and Ramparts, Richard Flom took the lead songwriting role, though all founding members contributed to both albums. New members Kyle Lloyd (drums) and Gretchen Lohse (strings/vocals) were added. The Spinto Band's Nick Krill mixed both records.

== Discography ==
- The Meter Glows - 2003 Feel Records
- Concrete the Instrument - 2005 self-released EP
- Roomful of Lions - 2006 Park the Van Records
- The Farthest Shore - 2009 Park the Van Records
- Ramparts - 2012 self-released
