= The Philadelphia Singers =

American choir

- Choir
- Founded: 1972
- Founder: Michael Korn
- Disbanded: 2015
- Headquarters: Philadelphia, Pennsylvania
- Website: philadelphiasingers.org^{[Archived 19 May 2015]}

The Philadelphia Singers was an American choir based in Philadelphia, in the U.S. state of Pennsylvania.

== History ==
Michael Korn founded The Philadelphia Singers over the period 1971–1972. During Korn's tenure, The Philadelphia Singers featured on the first commercial recording of the Roman Vespers of George Frideric Handel. Korn served as the ensemble's music director until his death in 1991. David Hayes succeeded Korn as the ensemble's music director, from 1992 to 2015.

In 2001, The Philadelphia Singers was named "Resident Chorus of The Philadelphia Orchestra" and was the only chorus to receive this distinction. With The Philadelphia Orchestra, the choir sang United States premieres of works by Sir James MacMillan, Luciano Berio, and Augusta Read Thomas, as well as world premieres of works by Daniel Kellogg and Jennifer Higdon.

The Philadelphia Singers appeared twice at the Lincoln Center Festival with Kurt Masur and the New York Philharmonic, premiering for the first time in the United States works by Krysztof Penderecki and Dov Seltzer.

The Philadelphia Singers maintained its own annual subscription series and was the only Philadelphia ensemble to have a regular national radio broadcast on Public Radio International called "Christmas with The Philadelphia Singers". The program was a live broadcast of its annual concert, "Christmas on Logan Square", at St. Clement's Church. The ensemble presented choral music from all periods, with a particular focus on American choral music.

In 2013, Hayes had announced his intention to stand down as the ensemble's music director at the close of the 2014–2015 season. In December 2014, The Philadelphia Singers announced cessation of operations effective at the end of the 2014–2015 season. The reasons included rising costs and lack of funding sources. The Philadelphia Singers gave its final performance in May 2015.

== Music directors ==
- Michael Korn (1971–1991)
- David Hayes (1992–2015)
