= Philadelphia Chamber Music Society =

The Philadelphia Chamber Music Society is a non-profit presenter of chamber music and recitals and one of the largest organizations of its kind in the United States. It was created, in 1986, by Anthony Checchia and Philip Maneval, its Founding Artistic Director and Executive Director respectively. Miles Cohen was appointed Artistic Director in 2013. The Society presents approximately 50 chamber music concerts, instrumental and vocal recitals and special events each season by international artists (for example, András Schiff and the Kronos Quartet in 2020-21), and at low prices ($30 or less per ticket) that encourage classical music attendance by people from differing economic levels.

The Society is one of the resident companies of the Kimmel Center for the Performing Arts and the largest music presenter in that center's Perelman Theater. The annual program offers a diversity of repertoire including masterworks, rarely heard pieces and new music. It also presents concerts at the American Philosophical Society's Benjamin Franklin Hall and other Center City Philadelphia venues.

Since its founding, the Society has presented more than 1,700 concerts by hundreds of ensembles and recitalists, and it has commissioned numerous new works, including music by Richard Wernick, William Bolcom, Nicholas Maw, George Rochberg, Stephen Jaffe, and other prominent composers. The Society also runs an extensive music education program.
