= Zonic Shockum =

American rock-music band

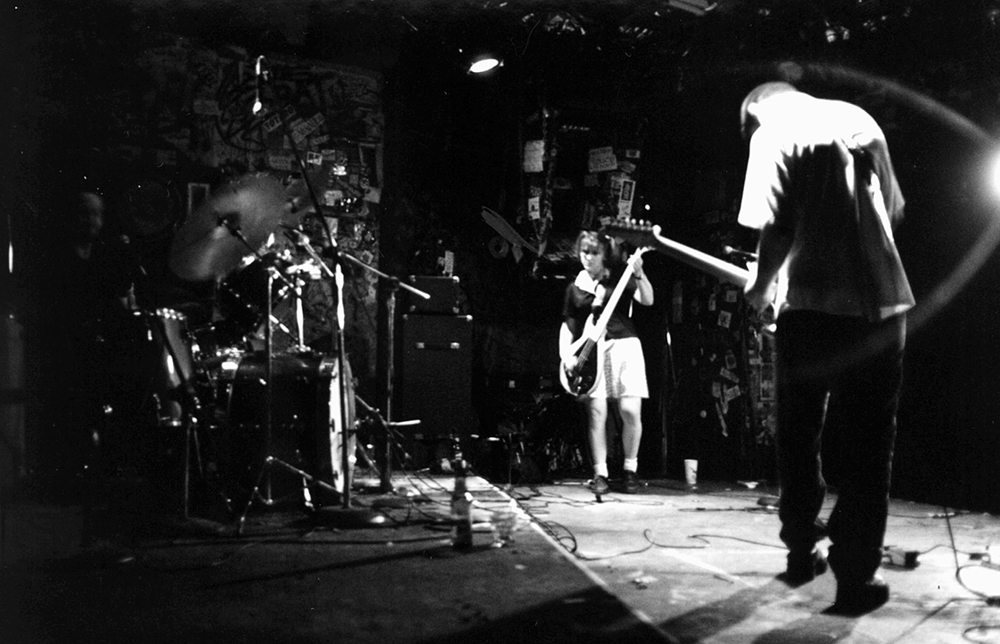
- Zonic Shockum onstage at CBGB in 1997

Background information
- Origin: Philadelphia, Pennsylvania
- Genres: Alternative rock, post-punk
- Years active: 1988-present
- Labels: Black Plastic, Beef Eater, Compulsiv, Grass, Decoder Ring, Stain Music, Belligerent
- Members: Stephen P. Anderson; Debbie Polak Anderson; Marc Sonstein; Andrew Ferrence
- Past members: Larry Feraca; Bob Fowler; Mitchell Landsman; Ned Sonstein

Zonic Shockum is an American alternative rock band formed in 1988 in Philadelphia.

== History ==
In 1988, Stephen P. Anderson, under the moniker of Zonic Shockum, recorded a 17-song cassette titled Pleasure which received distribution through Sound Choice mail-order catalog and Tower Records in Philadelphia and garnered a positive review in the German music magazine Zap. The tape featured girlfriend Debbie Polak singing on one song, and co-worker Marc Sonstein programming drums for another. Anderson's cover of "Chinese Rock" was carted at Drexel University's 91.7 for regular airplay.

In 1989 Polak and Sonstein joined Anderson as permanent members to form the nucleus of the performing and writing outfit. The trio records the track "Filth Divine" for Denver, Colorado label Black Plastic Records Powerless Compilation. That same year Larry Feraca came on briefly as bass player until being replaced in 1990 by Mitchell Landsman who contributed as a songwriter and vocalist. Bob Fowler came on in 1990 as lead guitarist. With this line-up, the band recorded its first self-released single "Whores" which received airplay at WKDU and WPRB as well as favorable reviews in Flipside and Philadelphia City Paper. The band then hit the local Philly bar, college & warehouse circuit for live gigs.

In 1992, after hearing a demo, Bryan Dilworth contacted the band to release a record on his fledgling Compulsiv Records label. Bryan put Zonic Shockum into the studio with Adam Lasus at Studio Red to record a 5-song EP for Compusiv and later a Sinatra tune, "Dream Away" for release on a double-CD from Grass Records in 1993 which also featured such notable acts as The Flaming Lips, Jawbox, and Screeching Weasel. Prior to recording "Dream Away" Marc's brother Ned Sonstein replaced Landsman on Bass.

After a break-in and equipment theft at their North Philadelphia rehearsal studio, Zonic Shockum relocated to a Northern Liberties practice space and recorded their next self-released single "No, You Suck" using a 4-track cassette recorder. Despite low production values, "No, You Suck" was listed as one of WKDU's top ten songs for 1993. A short time later, Bob left the line-up, Debbie and Steve married, and the Andersons and Sonsteins continued on as a four-piece.

In 1994 WKDU invited the band to contribute a track to its upcoming 7" boxed-set titled Scrapple, and so the band recorded "Labor" on an 8-track reel-to-reel recorder on loan from Adam Lasus.

In 1995, Zonic Shockum entered Art Difuria's Frizz recording studio in Center City Philadelphia and recorded six songs. Five of these tracks would be included in the band's self-titled debut CD. The remaining track, "The Wedding Song" was featured in the Kate McCabe 16mm documentary film Go-Go Mama Rama which was screened at the 1997 New York Underground Film Festival. Later that same year Zonic returned to Studio Red to work with J. Cox and record the remainder of the tracks for their debut album.

Prior to the release of the self-titled CD, Marc left to pursue a career as a restaurateur and opened his first café on Market Street in Philadelphia - which also provided a new practice space for the band in the storage area above the restaurant. Ned made the transition from bass to drums. Debbie took up the bass - and the new power trio format was born.

In 1998 Zonic got back with recording engineer J. Cox and set up camp in Manayunk, PA's Cycle Sound to record the 6-song EP "Here Today..." which Razorcake magazine refers to as: "Lady-fronted dissonant punk rock that won't be pigeonholed." A finely-honed Zonic Shockum was now playing some of the best venues of their career including CBGB and an indoor skate park with cKy, but Ned eventually lost interest in the group and quit.

In 2004, the original 5 performing members got back together briefly to play a benefit concert at their beloved Khyber Pass Pub to raise money for a friend of the group who had been diagnosed with stage IV cancer.

Shortly thereafter Steve and Debbie relocated to Polak's hometown in the Lehigh Valley where they have continued to write and record music together as Zonic Shockum. In 2015 they have joined forces once again with original drummer, Marc Sonstein.

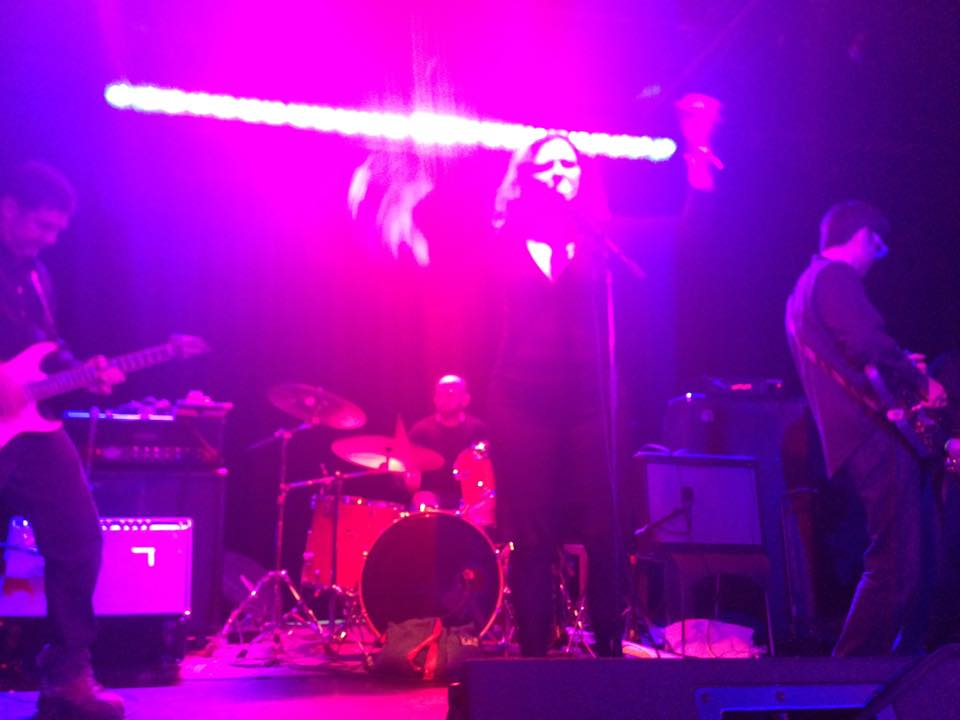
Zonic Shockum in 2016 at Underground Arts in Philadelphia

== Discography ==
=== Albums ===
- Zonic Shockum - 1997
- Dead Orchid - 2026

=== EPs ===
- Testosterone - 1992
- Here Today... - 2001

=== Singles ===
- Whores / Woe Is Me / Tape Worm - 1991
- No, You Suck / Lollipop / Bullet (Glenn Danzig) - 1993
- Between the 6s / Lugy - 1994
- Alley Hunter / The Ugly Pear - 1998

=== Compilations ===
- "Filth Divine" from The Powerless Compilation - 1989
- "Dream Away" (Williams/Williams) from Chairman of the Board - Interpretations of Songs Made Famous by Frank Sinatra - 1993
- "Labor" from Scrapple - 1994
- "Ultraman" from Split 7" single with Jacksonville's Gizzard - 1995
- "Neima Piwa" from Lollipop Magazine No. 57 MP3 CD - 2002

=== Film ===
- "The Wedding Song" - featured in Go-Go Mama Rama (1995 Kate McCabe/Hot Pants Productions)
