= Albert Rosewig =

Albert Henry Rosewig (he spelled it Albert RoSewig) (29 April 1846 – 7 May 1929) was an American composer from Philadelphia, Pennsylvania, born in Hanover. He was an influential and modernist composer of hymns.

Rosewig is generally acknowledged as the most important American composer of Roman Catholic liturgical music in his time. He operated a publishing house in Philadelphia for his own works and those of others, whereby his works were disseminated nationally. One of his major works was the hymnal Concentus Sacri, where among his own compositions and those of Rossini, Mozart, Verdi, and others, he freely romanticized and harmonized Gregorian chants and priests' altar chants. Opponents of this practice complained to the Vatican in 1919, where he was then charged with embellishing Gregorian chants. Pope Benedict XV issued an edict against what he was doing, which effectively ended his career. He spent his last ten years in seclusion.

He was the music director of St. Charles Borromeo church in Philadelphia from about 1880 to 1919.
