= Jessica Brillhart =

Jessica Brillhart is an American immersive director, writer, and theorist, known for her work in virtual reality filmmaking.

She has made a range of VR experiences, working with NASA, Bose, the Philharmonia Orchestra in London, Google’s Artists and Machine Intelligence program, and the Montreal Canadiens. In 2017, Brillhart was recognized by MIT Technology Review as an innovator and pioneer in the field of virtual reality filmmaking and immersive entertainment. She is specialized in virtual reality, augmented reality, and intelligent systems.

== Biography ==
Jessica Brillhart graduated from the New York University in the Courant Institute of Mathematical Sciences a Minor in Computer Applications. After this she graduated in 2007 from a Bachelor of Fine Arts at the New York University - Tisch School of the Arts. In 2007 Brillhart participated in the reality show and online competition On the Lot, where she submitted her short film "To Screw in a Light Bulb". Brillhart made it past the first week, but was eliminated in the second.

From 2004 to 2007, Brillhart worked for Apple as a Lead Creative, Mac specialist in New York. Brillhart worked for Uvphactory, a motion design, visual effects and production company, as a lead editor from 2007 to 2009. They provide branding services and direct commercials, music videos, and short films. . Brillhart was the immersive director of M ss ng p eces, a new wave production and entertainment company, from 2018 to 2019.

In 2018, Brillhart founded Vrai Pictures, an immersive VR content company. In 2019, Vrai Pictures and Superbright created Traverse, a platform for spatial audio experiences which uses a mobile device and AR audio wearables. Traverse was awarded Special Jury Recognition for The Future of Experience at SXSW. On June 25, 2019, USC announced Brillhart as the incoming director of the Institute for Creative Technologies' Mixed Reality Lab.

As principal filmmaker for virtual reality at Google, Brillhart developed content including "World Tour", the first virtual reality film created using the Jump platform, and created editing techniques for virtual reality, including Probabilistic Experiential Editing.

Following Ann Druyan's use of the term in an interview, Brillhart began differentiating between VR film experiences and 2D films, or "flatties."
