= Peco Energy Jazz Festival =

Musical festival in Philadelphia, PA

The Peco Energy Jazz Festival is a music festival devoted to jazz held every February in Philadelphia, Pennsylvania.

== History ==
The first edition, held in 1989, was called the Philadelphia Jazz Weekend, and the name was changed the following year to the Presidential Jazz Weekend.

It changed its name to the current one in 1995 having previously been called the Presidential Jazz Festival.
