= Philadelphia Céilí Group =

The Philadelphia Céilí Group is a music organization in Philadelphia, Pennsylvania, United States, known for an annual Philadelphia Céilí Festival. The group claims that its festival is the only in the area that is "truly a traditional festival" and it is "one of the oldest continuous (if not the oldest) traditional Irish music and dance" festivals in the United States. The Céilí Group began in 1958 when a group of young Irish immigrants and Irish-American step and figure/ceili dancers gathered at The Irish Center (also founded in 1958) to formally promote Irish arts traditions.

The PCG started with Friday night céilís, aimed at people interested in learning Irish figure dances and musical instruments. Later, they began producing more varied events, including Irish theatre productions and Irish-Gaelic language lessons. The PCG also currently hosts an annual Irish-themed festival.

The annual festival began in 1975, when folklorist Mick Moloney expressed a need for a venue where Irish music and dance talent could be showcased without a competitive atmosphere, as was the case with all flags. Thirteen people met throughout the summer to make the festival a reality. Those people involved in organizing the first festival were Mickey and Jimmie McGill, Helen and Gus Haun, Sally and Dan Doughtery, Tina and Margaret Quigley, Tim Britton, Brian and Tim Quinn, Carl Zuckerman, and Dan Verbo.

Helen was instrumental in finding and negotiating a deal with the Fischers of Fischer's Pool, in Lansdale, PA as the first location for the festival. Fischer's Pool was a privately owned summer retreat with an Olympic sized pool that nearby residents joined to use throughout the summer and cabins that were also rented for the season. Fischer's Pool also hosted summer picnics for groups. There was a separate area for these group picnics with its own large field, several pavilions filled with picnic tables and a kitchen with window service. This was the area where the first Philadelphia Céilí Group Irish Music, Song and Dance Festival took place. Workshops were staged under the picnic pavilions. One of the pavilions had a concrete floor, as compared to dirt floors, so it was cleared of tables and the dancing took place there near the food and beer sales. It was the first non-competitive presentation of Irish Music, Song and Dance in the US.

It has expanded to a three-day festival in recent years.

The 2005 festival initiated a feature called an "Irish Circle of Song": singers in both the accompanied and the unaccompanied -"sean nos" - singing styles.

In 2007, "The Spoken Word" program was added to the festival to highlight the Irish contribution to poetry, drama, and prose.

The Céilí Group encourages artists of every generation, and brings to the stage the Philadelphia area’s youngest Irish step, céilí, and set dancers, singers, and instrumentalists.

During the COVID-19 pandemic, the Céilí group hosted a virtual festival online.
