= Anthony Checchia =

American arts administrator (1930–2024)

Anthony Phillip Checchia (4 June 1930 – 7 September 2024) was an American arts administrator and bassoonist.

== Biography ==
Born in Philadelphia, Pennsylvania, Checchia attended Jules E. Mastbaum Area Vocational Technical School and the Curtis Institute of Music. He graduated from Curtis in 1951. As a bassoonist, he played with the Baltimore Symphony Orchestra, the United States Navy Band, and the New York City Ballet Orchestra.

Checchia first attended the Marlboro Music Festival in 1956. In 1958, Rudolf Serkin invited Checchia to become the principal administrator of the Marlboro Music Festival. Checchia met the soprano Benita Valente at Marlboro. Valente and Checchia married in 1959.

In 1964, Checchia presented the inaugural Music From Marlboro concerts at the Theatre of Living Arts in Philadelphia. In 1986, Checchia and Philip Maneval co-founded the Philadelphia Chamber Music Society, with Checchia as artistic director and Maneval as executive director. Checchia was honoured with a plaque on the Philadelphia Music Walk of Fame in 2016.

Checchia and Valente had a son, Peter. Checchia died at his Rittenhouse Square residence in Philadelphia on 7 September 2024. His widow and son survived him.
