= Nicola Montani =

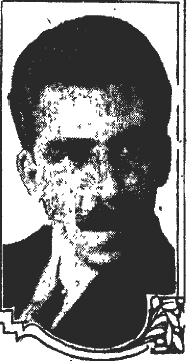
Nicola Montani

Nicola Aloysius Montani, KCSS (6 November 1880 in Utica, New York – 11 January 1948 in Philadelphia) was a conductor, composer, arranger, and publisher of sacred music.

His earliest musical studies were in Indianapolis with his brother Gaetano, Charles Schultze, composition with H. D. Beissenherz, organ with W. H. Donley, and Leslie E. Peck. In Indianapolis he formed part of the Montani Brothers Orchestra, and was also a member of the early Indianapolis Symphony Orchestra under Karl Schneider.

In 1903 he studied in Rome at the Conservatory of St. Cecilia, studying voice with Clara Bretschneider and future wife Catherine Sherwood, organ with Filippo Capocci, Gregorian chant with Rodolfo Kanzler and Antonio Rella. Further personal studies were pursued in Rome with Don Lorenzo Perosi, director of the Sistine Chapel Choir. In 1906 he studied Gregorian chant with the Benedictine Solesmes monks exiled on the Isle of Wight in Appuldurcombe House, including with Dom André Mocquereau and Dom Eudine. Upon his return to New York, he was music director of Newark's Cathedral Basilica of the Sacred Heart, and professor of music at the Immaculate Conception Seminary in Mahwah, NJ.

He moved to Philadelphia in 1906, to be music director at St. John the Evangelist church. During the rest of his career in the Philadelphia area, he also taught and directed choirs at dozens of schools including J. W. Hallahan High School, West Philadelphia Catholic Girls High School (now West Catholic Preparatory High School), St. Mary's Academy, Mater Misericordiae Academy (now the Merion Mercy Academy), the Melrose Academy (run by the Grey Nuns of the Sacred Heart), and the Academy of Mercy (now the Gwynedd Mercy Academy High School). He was the editor for liturgical music for the Schirmer and Boston Music Company publishing houses.

He founded and conducted the Catholic Choir Club, which soon became the Palestrina Choir. Their recordings for Victor were among the first recordings available of Renaissance polyphony. He also founded the Choral Festival of Catholic Choirs, and directed it during their performance of his Festival Mass in the 1926 United States Sesquicentennial Exposition.

In 1915 Montani cofounded the St. Gregory Guild and the Society of St. Gregory of America with Leo Manzetti and Dr. Petter, leading American Gregorian chant reform efforts pursuant to Pope Pius X's motu proprio Inter pastoralis officii sollicitudines. These efforts were modelled after the Cecilian Societies formed in Italy. Conventions and demonstrations were held throughout North America, and he organized subsidiary Choir Guilds in various chapters of the American Guild of Organists. The Society's official journal was the Catholic Choirmaster, which he edited. He published white lists and black lists of music appropriate or antagonistic for liturgy. He wrote the guide The Correct Pronunciation of Latin According to the Roman Usage.

In 1920, through the Society of St. Gregory he published the famous St. Gregory Hymnal and Catholic Choir Book, containing mainly his own editions and compositions, similar to Oreste Ravanello's work. Under sponsorship from the Library of Congress, he also published a Braille version of the hymnal in nine volumes, the first Braille hymnal.

Pope Pius XI made Montani a Knight Commander of St. Sylvester in 1926. In 1947, in recognition of his pioneering work in the field of sacred music, the Society of St. Gregory awarded him a gold plaque.

Montani was married to singer Catherine Sherwood, daughter of Missouri Supreme Court Chief Justice Thomas Adiel Sherwood.

== Selected Compositions ==
- O' Girls of the Hallahan High (1916), the alma mater of the J. W. Hallahan Catholic Girls High School.
- Ecce Sacerdos for organ
- Panis Angelicus for organ
- O Come and Mourn with Me, for choir
- Festival Mass
- Missa Brevis
- Missa Solemnis in E flat for SATB, which for a while was sung every Easter Sunday in the Milan Duomo, conducted by Marziano Perosi, his teacher's brother.
- Tantum Ergo for SATB chorus
- Alma Redemptoris Mater for SATB chorus
- Vespers of the Blessed Virgin for antiphonal SATB choirs
- The Bells, setting of Poe poem
- Your Flag and My Flag, setting of Wilbur Nesbit poem
- The Road to France, song

== Selected publications ==
- "Essentials in Sight Singing" - a modern method of Selfeggio, Book I, Parts One and Two of the Complete Work Fundamentals. Published by the C.C. Birchard & Company in Boston. ©1931, printed October 1936. Foreword by J. Lewis Browne.
- "St. Gregory Hymnal and Catholic Choir Book"
- "The Correct Pronunciation of Latin According to the Roman Usage"
