= Kimmel Center for the Performing Arts =

Performing arts center in Philadelphia, Pennsylvania, United States

Coordinates: 39.9467°N 75.1656°W

The Kimmel Center for the Performing Arts
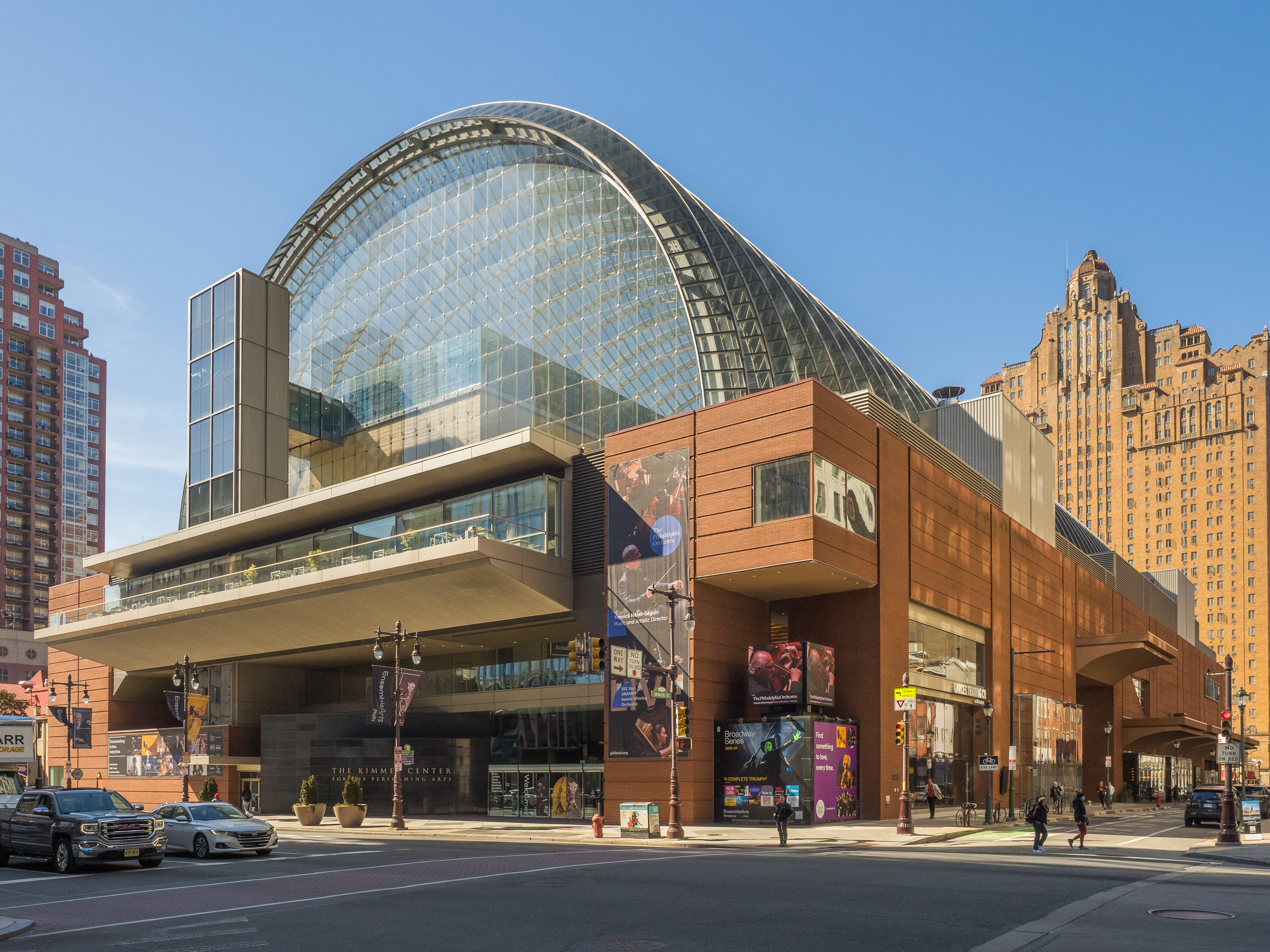
- Kimmel Center for the Performing Arts
- Interactive map of The Kimmel Center for the Performing Arts
- Address: 300 South Broad Street; Philadelphia, Pennsylvania 19102; United States
- Owner: Ensemble Arts and The Philadelphia Orchestra
- Capacity: Marian Anderson Hall: 2,500 seats Perelman Theater: 650 seats
- Type: concert hall recital theater
- Production: Marian Anderson Hall: Philadelphia Youth Orchestra, The Philadelphia Orchestra, Peter Nero and the Philly Pops; Perelman Theater: The Chamber Orchestra of Philadelphia, Opera Philadelphia, Philadanco, Philadelphia Chamber Music Society
- Public transit: Walnut–Locust: B 12th–13th & Locust + 15th–16th & Locust: PATCO Speedline SEPTA bus: 4, 27, 32

Construction
- Opened: December 16, 2001
- Architect: Rafael Viñoly Architects, PC

Website
- www.ensembleartsphilly.org

The Kimmel Center for the Performing Arts is a large performing arts venue in the Center City section of Philadelphia. It is located at 300 South Broad Street and the corner of Spruce Street, along the stretch known as the Avenue of the Arts. It is owned and operated by The Philadelphia Orchestra and Ensemble Arts, which also manages the Academy of Music in Philadelphia, and, since November 2016, the Miller Theater (formerly the Merriam Theater). The center is named after philanthropist Sidney Kimmel.

The center is the home of the Philadelphia Orchestra, one of America's "Big Five" symphony orchestras, as well as the Ensemble Arts Presents Series, including a variety of jazz, comedy, rock, dance, speakers, and more. Ensemble Arts Philly's facilities are home to some of Philadelphia's premier artistic organizations including the Chamber Orchestra of Philadelphia, Philadanco, the Philadelphia Chamber Music Society, Opera Philadelphia, Philadelphia Ballet, and Curtis Institute of Music.

== History ==
=== 20th century ===
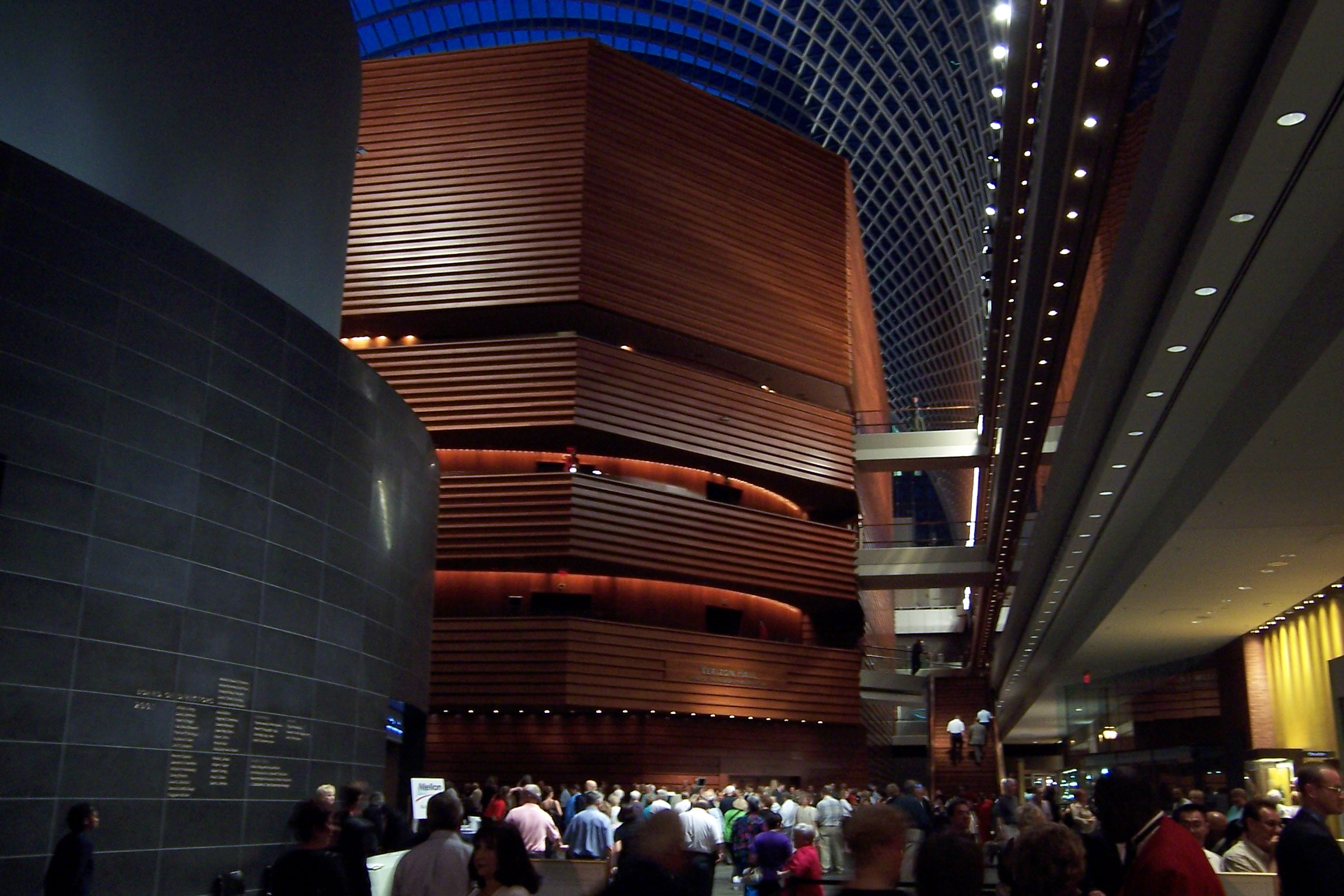
The interior of the Kimmel Center with Marian Anderson Hall (middle) and the Perelman Theater (left) in September 2005

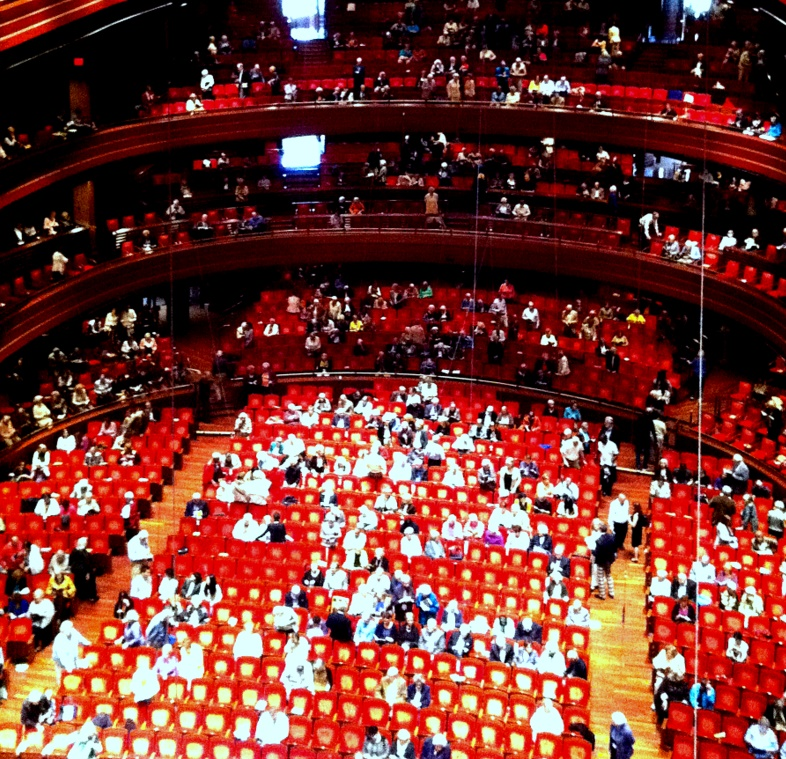
Interior of Marian Anderson Hall during intermission of the Philadelphia Orchestra matinee concert in May 2015

In 1986, the Philadelphia Orchestra approved a plan to construct a new concert hall to replace the aging Academy of Music. It hoped to complete the new facility in time for its 1991 season. The desire to move the orchestra from its facilities in the Academy of Music emerged as early as 1908, however plans stalled due to the lack of consensus on the project's scope and funding. They were revived again in the 1920s only to be scuttled by the Great Depression.

Plans emerged again shortly after World War II when performing arts centers were constructed in other cities such as New York, Washington and Los Angeles. Despite the 1986 commitment, the project languished until 1993 when Sidney Kimmel donated $12 million to the project and in 1995, Orchestra and community leaders met to help revitalize the concert hall and also discussed merging it with a venue to house other area organizations and visiting artists. The two projects were officially merged as the Regional Performing Arts Center in 1996 and construction began in 1998.

=== 21st century ===
In 2000, the center was named for Sidney Kimmel in recognition of his gift in 1993 and an additional $3 million donation in 1998. The concert hall was originally named Verizon Hall to recognize contributions totaling $14.5 million in cash, equipment and services from Verizon and the Verizon Foundation.

The architect of the center was Rafael Viñoly, and the acoustician was Artec Consultants. The Kimmel Center officially opened in an unfinished state on December 16, 2001. This followed a gala preview on December 14 featuring performances by André Watts, Denyce Graves, Frederica von Stade and Sir Elton John and the Philadelphia Orchestra premiere at Verizon Hall on December 15. Numerous cost overruns and construction delays led to the filing of a lawsuit in 2005 by officials of the Kimmel Center against Viñoly. The lawsuit was settled for an undisclosed sum in 2006.

== Performance and other facilities ==
A vaulted glass ceiling encloses the entire structure providing a large common lobby for all the facilities. The center is a popular attraction, keeping its doors open to the public seven days a week. It hosts thousands of visitors annually and offers free tours of the facility regularly.

- Marian Anderson Hall (formerly Verizon Hall), with 2,500 seats, is the main performance auditorium. When opened, it was named Verizon Hall to recognize a contribution of $14.5 million from the communications company. The agreement kept the Verizon name in place until 2024 when it was renamed in honor of contralto Marian Anderson, a Philadelphia native and civil-rights activist, on June 8. The name change was the result of a $25 million donation from Richard Worley and wife, Leslie Anne Miller, who are both former board members of the Philadelphia Orchestra and Kimmel Center.

The hall contains a pipe organ manufactured by Dobson Pipe Organ Builders, which is the largest mechanical-action pipe organ in an American concert hall. The organ is Dobson's Opus 76 and is named for Fred J. Cooper. The hall has two consoles with four manuals, 97 ranks and 124 stops.

- Perelman Theater, with 650 seats, has a 75-foot (23 m)-diameter turntable stage that permits the space to be used as a recital hall or a proscenium theater with a stage, fly-loft and orchestra pit.
- Dorrance H. Hamilton Roof Garden located above the Perelman Theater.
- SEI Innovation Studio, a 2,688-square-foot (249.7 m^{2}) black-box theater located on the lower levels of the Kimmel Center.
- Smaller performance spaces and meeting rooms.

== Other noteworthy programs ==
The Kimmel Center offers a variety of other programs besides concerts, specifically in the field of education. The Philadelphia Orchestra and Ensemble Arts Philly present a diverse array of educational offerings, including Jazz For Freedom, which explores social change through the history and traditions of Jazz; Musical Theater Program: Set The Stage, introducing middle school aged students to musical theater; a school ensemble program at KIPP West Philadelphia Preparatory Charter School, with instrumental, ensemble-based instruction for elementary and middle school students; Summer Arts Sessions, the performing arts summer camp; and so much more.

== See also ==
- List of concert halls
