= Singing City =

Singing City is a volunteer-based non-profit choral organization founded by Dr. Elaine Brown, Temple University in 1948. The Philadelphia-based organization was born from the Fellowship House movement, based on the idea that cultural differences could be bridged through shared activities. Its stated mission is "to be an artistic, social and spiritual force, bringing people together through choral music." In addition to a 100-person volunteer adult choir, the organization also works to offer music instruction to under-funded elementary schools in Philadelphia.

The choir was also involved in the civil rights movement, traveling through the southern states during the 1950s and the 1960s, in addition to performances in Philadelphia, the inspiration for the choirs 2013 commission and performance of "The Children's March." The group has also traveled throughout the world, performing with the Israel Philharmonic in the 1970s, and was the first western choir to perform with the Leningrad Philharmonic in 1990.

Since July,2023 Rollo Dilworth has served as the Artistic and Musical Director. As of 2025, the chorus has 100 members.
