= Society of St Gregory =

The Society of St Gregory is an organization devoted to Catholic church music in the British Isles. It was founded by Dom Bernard McElligott, a monk of the Benedictine monastery at Ampleforth Abbey, in 1929.

It aims to further the study and understanding of church music and, more widely, liturgy, with a view to promoting the active participation of the people in accordance with the teaching of the church. As such, the Society of St Gregory promotes the use of all forms of music, from ancient to contemporary, which engage people in prayer.

The Society's notes on its historical record that McElligott "took note of Pope Pius X's desire in 1903 for Christian faithful to participate more closely ... in the most holy mysteries [of the liturgy] and in the public and solemn prayer of the Church".
