= Chamber Orchestra of Philadelphia =

American chamber orchestra

The Chamber Orchestra of Philadelphia
- Orchestra
- Founded: 1966; 60 years ago
- Location: Philadelphia, United States
- Concert hall: Kimmel Center for the Performing Arts
- Music director: David Hayes
- Website: www.chamberorchestra.org

The Chamber Orchestra of Philadelphia is an American chamber orchestra based in Philadelphia, Pennsylvania. Its principal concert venue is the Perelman Theater of the Kimmel Center for the Performing Arts, of which the orchestra is a founding resident company. The orchestra's current music director is David Hayes, as of the 2024–2025 season. The orchestra's current executive director is Anne Hagan, since December 2018.

== History ==
In 1963, Marc Mostovoy had the idea of establishing a chamber orchestra in Philadelphia to collaborate on recording with Marcel Tabuteau, a retired oboist with The Philadelphia Orchestra. Tabuteau expressed enthusiasm for Mostovoy's idea, but died before the recording collaboration could occur with Mostovoy and the orchestra. Continuing this concept of a new chamber orchestra for Philadelphia, and with an initial name of the Wynnefield Concerto Orchestra, Mostovoy formally founded the orchestra under the new name Concerto Soloists 16, in 1964. In its early years, the orchestra's primary performing venue was the Harrison Auditorium of the University of Pennsylvania. Along with the initial plans for recording with Tabuteau, Mostovoy had also intended this chamber orchestra to provide performance opportunities to young professional musicians emerging from the Curtis Institute of Music, the University of Pennsylvania, Temple University, the New School of Music, and the Philadelphia Musical Academy. One specialist feature of this orchestra was to have orchestra musicians stand during performance where appropriate, in a nod to earlier baroque and classical era traditions.

The orchestra has a core roster of 33 musicians. The ensemble has had several names over its history, which have included:

- 16 Concerto Soloists
- The Mostovoy Soloists
- Concerto Soloists of Philadelphia
- Concerto Soloists Chamber Orchestra of Philadelphia

Renovations to the Harrison Auditorium forced the orchestra to discontinue concerts at the University of Pennsylvania. The orchestra continued to perform around Philadelphia, including service as the accompanying orchestra for baroque opera, in 17 different venues. These venues included the Walnut Street Theatre, where the orchestra had residence from 1975 to 1983, and again from 1990 to 1996. In 2000, the orchestra changed its name to The Chamber Orchestra of Philadelphia, and took up permanent residence at the Perelman Theater of the Kimmel Center upon the formal opening of the center.

In 1982, Mostovoy invited Max Rudolf to appear as a regular conductor. The orchestra granted Rudolf the title of conductor laureate, and Rudolf continued to appear with the orchestra until 1993. Mostovoy concluded his tenure as music director in 2004.

In 1994, Ignat Solzhenitsyn, a concert pianist and conducting graduate from the Curtis Institute of Music, joined the ensemble as assistant conductor. In 1998, he was named principal conductor, and he became music director in 2004. During Solzhenistyn's tenure, financial concerns led to the reduction of its 10-concert season to 4 concerts in 2009. Solzhenitsyn stepped down as music director in 2010, and became conductor laureate.

The Belgian conductor and composer Dirk Brossé had guest-conducted the orchestra in 2008 and in 2009. In September 2010, Brossé became the orchestra's music director. In January 2017, the orchestra extended Brossé's contract through the 2021–2022 season. Brossé concluded his tenure at the close of the 2023–2024 season. With the advent of the 2024–2025 season, David Hayes became music director of the orchestra.

The orchestra has also performed new music, with a focus on regional Philadelphia composers. The orchestra has premiered over seventy new works. In 2017, COP began their Composer-in-Residency with support from the American Composers Forum - Philadelphia Chapter and the Steven R. Gerber Trust, with Adam Vidiksis as the orchestra's first composer-in-residence.

Past executive directors of the orchestra have included Robert J. Elias, Peter Gistelinck and Janelle McCoy. In July 2016, the orchestra announced Bill Rhoads as its new executive director, and he formally assumed the post in September 2016. Anne Hagan began her tenure as executive director in December 2018.

== Music Directors ==
- Marc Mostovoy (1964–2004)
- Ignat Solzhenistyn (2004–2010)
- Dirk Brossé (2010–2024)
- David Hayes (2024–present)
