= Barbara Thorne Stevenson =

American soprano

Barbara Thorne, also known by her married name Barbara Stevenson and as Barbara Thorne Stevenson, (26 December 1909 – 23 October 1985) was an American soprano who had an active performance career from 1930 through 1959. She made her professional singing debut in 1930 as a soloist with the Portland Symphony Orchestra while an undergraduate music student at Pacific University. She performed in several more oratorios with that orchestra in the 1930s. She continued to perform professionally while pursuing further vocal studies at the Curtis Institute of Music in Philadelphia from 1935–1938 where she was a pupil of Harriet van Emden and Estelle Liebling. She was a leading soprano of the Philadelphia Opera Company from 1939–1942, and also performed with other American opera companies during the 1940s and 1950s. She also worked as an oratorio soloist, mainly in the cities of Philadelphia and New York City, but also on stages throughout the United States. In 1939 she recorded Wolfgang Amadeus Mozart's Requiem with the Philadelphia Orchestra for RCA Victor. In the 1950s she taught on the voice faculties of the University of North Texas and Southern Methodist University.

== Early life, education and early career in Oregon ==
Barbara Jane Thorne was born on December 26, 1909 in Portland, Oregon. She was the daughter of Norman Campbell Thorne and Clara Isabell Thorne (née Blakeney). Her father was the assistant superintendent of Portland Public Schools. As a teenager she studied singing in her native city with Edith Collais Evans (1884–1970), and as a part of Evans' studio gave a recital sponsored by the Sherman Clay music company on October 26, 1928 at the age of 18. Evans would later become both the head of the music department and the Dean of Women at the University of Alaska. Thorne attended Franklin High School in Portland where she starred in the title role of the school's November 1928 production of Franz Schubert's Rosamunde.

After graduating from high school in 1929, Thorne studied music at Pacific University (PU) in Forest Grove, Oregon. While a student at PU she won a vocal contest sponsored by the Portland Symphony Orchestra (PSO) which led to a contract to perform with the symphony. In April 1930 she was the soprano soloist in Ludwig van Beethoven's Symphony No. 9 with the PSO; a work she later repeated with the orchestra in January 1935. She also appeared as a soloist with the PSO in George Frideric Handel's Messiah in December 1931 and Johannes Brahms' A German Requiem in February 1938.

In October 1930 Thorne won the Oregon state division of the Atwater Kent Foundation's national singing competition, and the following December 1930 she placed third in the Western division of that competition. She also won the Oregon state division in 1932. In 1933 she won first place in the Oregon Federation of Music Clubs singing competition.

In March 1932 she starred in a production of The Mikado with the Portland Opera Association. In April 1933 she sang the role of Gilda in Rigoletto with the KGW Opera Club for a radio broadcast of the opera on local Portland radio stations. She performed in several more radio broadcasts with the KGW Opera Club for radio broadcasts on KGW (radio) and KEX (AM) in Portland; including the role of Violetta in Giuseppe Verdi's La traviata in December 1933, and the role of Micaëla in Carmen in July 1934. In January 1934 she was a soloist with the Lawrence Turn Verein Orchestra for concerts in Portland. In March 1934 she appeared in recital at Pythian Hall in a concert sponsored by the Portland Artist's Association. She performed new works by Oregon composers at the convention of the Oregon Federation of Music Clubs in July 1934.

In August 1935 she was a soloist with Eddy Duchin and his orchestra on a national NBC Radio broadcast. Later, while studying in Philadelphia, she returned to Portland to give a recital at Lincoln High School on September 15, 1936.

On February 18, 1938 she gave a recital in Logansport, Indiana under the auspices of the Logansport Cooperative Concerts Association.

== Musical training and career in Philadelphia ==
Thorne pursued further studies at the Curtis Institute of Music where she was a pupil of Harriet van Emden in the 1935–1936 academic year. On December 9, 1936 she sang three songs by Franz Liszt on a Philadelphia radio program dedicated to featuring Curtis students. That same day she gave a recital at the Sylvania Hotel in Philadelphia. By the 1937–1938 academic year she was a voice student of Estelle Liebling at Curtis. She graduated from Curtis on May 17, 1938. After her graduation she continued to be involved with Curtis, notably singing on a Curtis radio broadcast on CBS Radio on October 31, 1938 in which she performed music by Giacomo Puccini, Antonio Guarnieri, Félix Fourdrain, Mary Evelene Calbreath, Gustave Charpentier, and Sergei Rachmaninoff.

While a student at Curtis she sang the part of the Widow in Felix Mendelssohn's Elijah given in performances on multiple Sunday afternoons at the Second Presbyterian Church in Philadelphia in October 1936, and repeated that work at the First Baptist Church in Philadelphia the following December. She previously had worked as a soloist in other oratorios given at the Second Presbyterian Church under the music direction of Alexander McCurdy in the 1930s, including Brahms' A German Requiem, Gioachino Rossini's Stabat Mater, and Johann Sebastian Bach's St Matthew Passion. She continued to perform works under McCurdy at the Second Presbyterian Church, including working as the soprano soloist in Bach's Ein feste Burg ist unser Gott, BWV 80 (November 1938), Richard Purvis's Mass of Saint Nicholas (March 1940), Frances McCollin's Sleep, Holy babe (December 1940 and December 1942), and Verdi's Requiem (April 1943).

In the late 1930s, Thorne was a contracted singer at WCAU radio in Philadelphia and was utilized by the station on a variety of different programs. In January 1939 she made her professional opera debut at the Academy of Music with Sylvan Levin's Philadelphia Opera Company (POC) as Mimì in Giacomo Puccini's La bohème with Fritz Krueger as Rodolfo and Frances Greer as Musetta. She performed with that company again the following April in the title role of Puccini's Suor Angelica with Elsie MacFarlane as The Princess. She continued to perform with the POC, appearing as Violetta in La traviata (1940), Micaëla in Carmen (1940), Marie (Americanization of Mařenka) in The Bartered Bride (1940), Mimì (1941), and Lia in L'enfant prodigue (1941).

In October 1938 Thorne was the soloist in a concert sponsored by the Adath Jeshurun Women's Association of the Congregation Adath Jeshurun in Elkins Park, Pennsylvania. On April 20, 1939 she was the soprano soloist in Wolfgang Amadeus Mozart's Requiem with the Philadelphia Orchestra at the Academy of Music; a performance recorded live for RCA Victor. In the summer of 1939 Thorne was a guest soloist with Duke University's choir. In December 1941 she portrayed Frasquita in Carmen with the Trenton Opera Association at the Trenton War Memorial with Carolina Segrera in the title role and Raoul Jobin as Don Jose.

In May 1940 Thorne was the soloist in Bach's Trauerode at the Philadelphia Bach Cantata Festival under the direction of James Allan Dash. The following October she joined the voice faculty of the Granoff Music Studios on Chestnut St.

By 1942 Thorne was working as the resident soprano soloist at the First Baptist Church in Philadelphia. That year she starred in a touring production of La traviata with Giorgio D'Andria's National Opera Company. On March 25, 1942 she was the soprano soloist in Bach's St Matthew Passion at the Church of the Divine Paternity in New York. In July 1942 she gave a recital at the Young People's Temple in Ocean Grove, New Jersey with tenor Fritz Krueger. On December 27, 1942 she performed the world premiere of Lazare Saminsky's Rye Septet at a concert presented by the League of Composers in New York. She was a guest soloist with Syracuse University's chorus for their 1943 spring concert.

In 1945 and 1946 she once again performed as a soloist under James Allan Dash in oratorios with the Philadelphia Bach Festival Chorus and 70 members of the Philadelphia Orchestra accompanying.

== New York, Texas, and beyond ==
Beginning in 1944, newspaper accounts began referring Barbara Thorne as either Barbara Thorne Stevenson or Barbara Stevenson. By this time she had moved to New York City where she was studying singing with the well known voice teacher and contralto Amy Ellerman. In New York she was a paid soprano soloist at the Temple Emanu-El. In April 1944 she appeared at The Town Hall in New York City in a concert of Russian music with the choir of the Temple Emanu-El of New York.

In December 1944 Thorne Stevenson was the soprano soloist in Ernest Bloch's symphony Israel with the New York Philharmonic under conductor Artur Rodziński; a performance which was broadcast on American radio. She was a soloist with the Norwalk Oratorio Society in Connecticut on December 12, 1944, and with the Oratorio Society of New York (OSNY) at Carnegie Hall on December 23, 1944 in performances of Handel's Messiah. She repeated the work again with the OSNY at Carnegie Hall in December 1945 and April 1949. She also performed as a soloist in the Messiah with the Washington Choral Society at Constitution Hall (December 1948), Salt Lake Oratorio Society under conductor Alfred M. Greenfield (December 1947 and January 1949), the Apollo Chorus of Chicago (December 1949) and the National Symphony Orchestra under Paul Callaway with the combined choirs of the Washington National Cathedral and the Washington Choral Society (December 1949).

In 1945 she performed the soprano solos in Bach's St Matthew Passion at Symphony Hall, Boston with the Handel and Haydn Society in February, and at the Kiel Auditorium for the St. Louis Bach Festival in May. She later performed this work with the Dallas Symphony Orchestra in March 1958.

In May 1945 Thorne Stephenson starred in a concert version of Richard Wagner's Tannhäuser with the Chattanooga Civic Opera in Tennessee. The following July she was the soprano soloist in Mendelssohn's Elijah with the Easton Oratorio Society in Pennsylvania. In February 1946 she performed in a concert at the Glebe Collegiate Institute in Canada with the Ottawa Choral Union. On April 23, 1946 she gave a concert of Lazare Saminsky's music at Times Hall in New York City. She repeated that program at the Philadelphia Music Academy on May 2, 1946.

In late 1946 Thorne Stephenson began working as a resident soprano at Riverside Church in Morningside Heights. In 1950 she was the soprano soloist in Bach's Wie schön leuchtet der Morgenstern, BWV 1 at The Town Hall in the inaugural concert of the Trinity Chorus of New York which was founded by the organist and conductor Walter Baker (1910–1988) of Holy Trinity Lutheran Church in Manhattan.

By the 1949–1950 academic school year, Thorne Stevenson was teaching on the voice faculty University of North Texas (then North Texas State College). In March 1950 she sang the role of Marguerite in Charles Gounod's Faust at the Fort Worth Opera. By 1953 she was teaching on the voice faculty of Southern Methodist University. In March 1953 she was the soprano soloist in Gustav Mahler's Symphony No. 2 with the Dallas Symphony Orchestra under the baton of Walter Hendl.

In 1954 Thorne Stevenson was an advisor to the board of the Tulsa Opera. In 1956 she performed in concert with the Midland Symphony Orchestra at Midland, Michigan's 12 Annual Spring Music Festival. In 1959 she performed the title role in Vincenzo Bellini's Norma with the Arkansas State Opera in Little Rock with Lili Chookasian as Adalgisa.

== Later life ==
The U.S., Social Security Death Index, 1935–2014 states that Barbara Thorne Stevenson died on 23 October 1985. It does not indicate where she died but states her last known residence was in Redmond, Oregon.

== Recordings ==
- Wolfgang Amadeus Mozart's Requiem; soloists: Barbara Thorne, Elsie MacFarlane, Donald Coker, and Lester Englander; Philadelphia Orchestra, University of Pennsylvania Choral society, and conductor Harl McDonald (1939 RCA Victor; re-released in 1941 on Voice of Music)
