= Bluebird of happiness =

Bird as harbinger or symbol

The symbol of a bluebird as the harbinger of happiness is found in many cultures and may date back thousands of years. The association appears in ancient Chinese mythology, Native American folklore, and European fairy tale traditions, and is thought to have entered widespread English usage largely through Maurice Maeterlinck's 1908 symbolist play The Blue Bird.

The idiom spread significantly through popular culture over the twentieth and twenty-first centuries, appearing in songs, films, television, literature, and video games. Notable examples include the 1934 American song "Bluebird of Happiness", the 1939 film The Wizard of Oz, and works by artists ranging from The Beatles to Bob Dylan.

In nature, the bluebird most commonly associated with the symbol is one of three species of North American thrush in the genus Sialia, of which the eastern bluebird (Sialia sialis) is the most widespread.

== Origins of idiom ==
=== Chinese mythology ===
One of the oldest examples of a blue bird in myth (found on oracle bone inscriptions of the Shang dynasty, 1766–1122 BC) is from pre-modern China, where a blue or green bird (qingniao) was the messenger bird of Xi Wangmu (the 'Queen Mother of the West'), who began life as a fearsome goddess and immortal. By the Tang dynasty (618–906 AD), she had evolved into a Daoist fairy queen and the protector/patron of "singing girls, dead women, novices, nuns, adepts and priestesses...women [who] stood outside the roles prescribed for women in the traditional Chinese family". Depictions of Xi Wangmu often include a bird—the birds in the earliest depictions are difficult to identify, and by the Tang dynasty, most of the birds appear in a circle, often with three legs, as a symbol of the sun.

=== Native American folklore ===
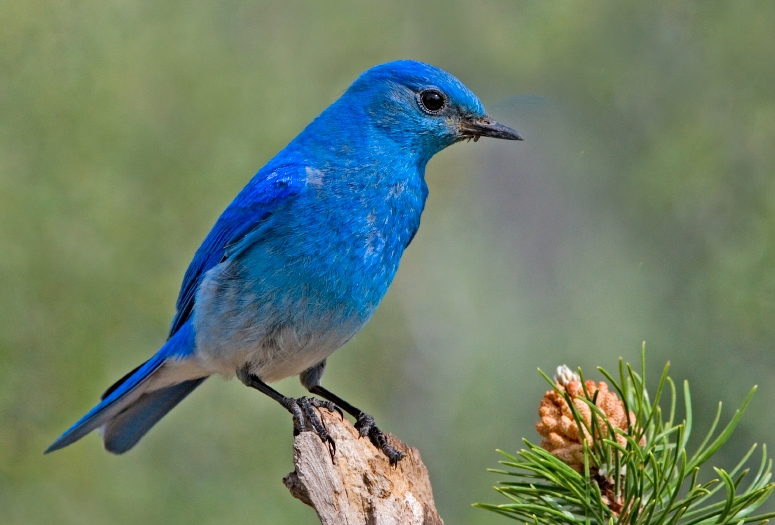
Mountain bluebird (Sialia currucoides) from North America

Among some Native Americans, the bluebird has mythological or literary significance.

According to the Cochiti tribe, the firstborn son of Sun was named Bluebird. In the tale "The Sun's Children", from Tales of the Cochiti Indians (1932) by Ruth Benedict, the male child of the sun is named Bluebird (Culutiwa).

The Navajo identify the mountain bluebird as a spirit in animal form, associated with the rising sun. The "Bluebird Song" is sung to remind tribe members to wake at dawn and rise to greet the sun:

Bluebird said to me,
"Get up, my grandchild.
It is dawn," it said to me.

The "Bluebird Song" is still performed in social settings, including the nine-day Ye'iibicheii winter Nightway ceremony, where it is the final song, performed just before sunrise of the ceremony's last day.

Most O'odham lore associated with the "bluebird" likely refers not to the bluebirds (Sialia) but to the blue grosbeak.

=== European folklore ===
In Russian fairy tales, the blue bird is a symbol of hope. More recently, Anton Denikin has characterized the Ice March of the defeated Volunteer Army in the Russian Civil War as follows:

We went from the dark night of spiritual slavery to unknown wandering – in search of the bluebird.

In L'Oiseau Bleu ("The Blue Bird") a popular tale included by Madame d'Aulnoy (1650–1705) in her collection Tales of the Fairies, King Charming is transformed into a blue bird, who aids his lover, the princess Fiordelisa, in her trials.

Most to the point, a "blue bird of happiness" features in ancient Lorraine folklore. In 1886, Catulle Mendès published Les oiseaux bleus ("the blue birds"), a story bundle inspired by these traditional tales. In 1892, Marcel Schwob, at the time secretary to Mendès, published the collection Le roi au masque d'or, (transl. The King with the Golden Mask) which included the story "Le pays bleu", (transl. The Blue Country) dedicated to his friend Oscar Wilde. Maurice Maeterlinck had entered Mendès's literary circle as well and in 1908 he published a symbolist stage play named The Blue Bird inspired by the same material. Two children, Tyltyl and Mytyl, are sent out by the fairy Bérylune to search for the Bluebird of Happiness. Returning home empty-handed, the children see that the bird has been in a cage in their house all along and they create great happiness for another by giving their pet bird to the sick neighbor child. Translated into English by Alexander Teixeira de Mattos, it played on Broadway from 1910. In the programme for the (revival of the) play at London's Haymarket Theatre in 1912, the programme explained: "The Blue Bird, inhabitant of the pays bleu, the fabulous blue country of our dreams, is an ancient symbol in the folk-lore of Lorraine, and stands for happiness." The play was quickly adapted into a children's novel, an opera, and at least seven films between 1910 and 2002.

See the German equivalent blaue Blume (blue flower).

== In popular culture ==
The immense popularity of Maeterlinck's play probably originated the idiom in English. In 1934, this was strengthened by the popular American song "Bluebird of Happiness". Written by Sandor Harmati and Edward Heyman, it was recorded several times by American tenor Jan Peerce, for RCA Victor and also by Art Mooney and His Orchestra.

The bluebird is featured in the song "Be Like The Bluebird" in the popular musical Anything Goes.

The lyrics "Somewhere, over the rainbow, bluebirds fly" in Harold Arlen and Yip Harburg's 1938 song for the 1939 film The Wizard of Oz is a likely allusion to the idiom as well.

Shirley Temple starred in the 1940 American fantasy The Blue Bird.

In 1942, the popular song "(There'll Be Bluebirds Over) The White Cliffs of Dover" used them, despite an absence of real blue birds on those cliffs, among other imagery to lift spirits.

The Academy Award-winning song, "Zip-a-Dee-Doo-Dah," from Walt Disney's 1946 live-action and animated film Song of the South, makes reference to "Mr. Bluebird on my shoulder" as a symbol of good cheer.

In the 1946 Japanese film No Regrets for Our Youth, directed by Akira Kurosawa, when Yukie and Noge reunite in Tokyo during the war, Yukie laments that she is not happy with her career and wants to do something truly meaningful in the struggle for freedom. Noge responds, "Who finds work like that even once in their lives? It's like finding The Blue Bird of Happiness."

The bluebird is mentioned at the end of the 1968 Beatles film Yellow Submarine, when the leader of the Blue Meanies, the Chief Blue Meanie claims that his "cousin is the bluebird of happiness". Beatles Paul McCartney wrote a song about them for his band Wings’ 1973 album Band on the Run, "Bluebird".

The Velvet Underground song “Candy Says” contains a line pertaining to watching the blue birds fly as a metaphor for happiness passing by Candy Darling, the song’s subject, while she is in the wrong body.

The Allman Brothers Band's 1972 song "Blue Sky" has the lyric "Don't fly, mister blue bird, I'm just walking down the road".

The bluebird occurs twice in songs written by Bob Dylan. "Up To Me", an outtake from Blood On the Tracks, 1975, has the lyric: "Everything went from bad to worse, money never changed a thing / Death kept followin’, trackin’ us down, at least I heard your bluebird sing". The song "Congratulations" from Traveling Wilburys Vol. 1, 1988, has the lyric: "This morning I looked out my window and found / A bluebird singing, but there was no one around".

A scene in the 1977 Disney film The Rescuers uses the bluebird as a symbol of "faith ... you see from afar."

In the 1985 film Sesame Street Presents: Follow that Bird, the Sleaze Brothers kidnap Big Bird and press him into service in their fun fair, where he is painted blue and billed as the Blue Bird of Happiness. In a play on the word "blue," Big Bird sings the mournful song "I'm So Blue."

The lyrics of the They Might Be Giants 1989 song "Birdhouse in Your Soul" by John Linnell includes the phrase "blue bird of friendliness."

The 2001 film K-PAX, directed by Iain Softley, written by Charles Leavitt and based on the book of the same name by Gene Brewer, contains a scene in which the lead character prot (played by Kevin Spacey), claiming to be a visitor from outer space. He ends up in a psychiatric ward where he 'prescribes' a fellow patient with the task of finding a 'Bluebird Of Happiness'. In a later scene, the fellow patient excitedly yells out that he finally found the Bluebird, resulting in pandemonium amongst patients spanning several floors of the institution.

The bluebird is also mentioned in The Melancholy of Haruhi Suzumiya episode "The Melancholy of Haruhi Suzumiya Part III" in 2006.

Musician Neil Young has a song "Beautiful Bluebird" about a lost love on his 2007 album Chrome Dreams II.

"Blue Bird" is a song by Hope Sandoval & the Warm Inventions from their 2009 album Through the Devil Softly.

A blue bird like device can be found in "The Bluebird of Zappiness" a 2010 episode of Cyberchase. The main antagonist of the episode, which is Ledge now that Hacker has teamed up with the main protagonists to form a temporary alliance, dream is to discover the bluebird before Hacker does. They all want to find it, so they wake up at dawn, coincidentally because the episode is all about finding the length of your shadows. One the protagonists, Inez ultimately tries to beat Ledge to the device through a climbing race contest, but there ultimately a tie and the bluebird gets lost once again.

The character Luna from the 2012 video game and visual novel Zero Escape: Virtue's Last Reward wears a necklace with a caged bluebird, and the story is discussed in one ending.

The titular bluebird of the song "Birds", from the 2013 album Government Plates by the experimental hip hop group Death Grips, is thought to be referencing Charles Bukowski's poem "Bluebird". In Bukowski's poem, the bluebird can represent vulnerability in general, or the vulnerability that Bukowski felt as a result of child abuse from his father.

In the 2015 video game, “Ensemble Stars!”, the character Tsumugi Aoba is commonly referred to as the bluebird of happiness, as a pun on his last name.

The bluebird is also mentioned by David Bowie in the song "Lazarus" from his 2016 album Blackstar.

In the 2018 video game Red Dead Redemption 2, during the scene where John Marston builds the ranch at Beecher's Hope, a bluebird is seen perched next to the gang while they are hammering and nailing the wood.

As a parallel, main characters relationship-analogy fairy tale, and an identically named, diegetic wind ensemble piece in which the main characters must play a dialog, in the 2018 anime movie Liz and the Blue Bird, a spinoff in the Sound! Euphonium franchise.

In a cartoon from Gary Larson, the (absent) bluebird of happiness is mentioned as counterpart of the "chicken of depression".

The character Meteion from the 2021 Final Fantasy XIV expansion pack Final Fantasy XIV: Endwalker is a blue-colored harpy-esque familiar who can transform herself into a blue-colored bird and has the power to read emotions.

In Thatgamecompany's 2019 release Sky: Children of the Light, the Season of the Blue Bird seasonal story update, that ran from April 21, 2025 to July 6, 2025, is based on the 1908 play The Blue Bird by Belgian playwright and poet Maurice Maeterlinck.

Berdly, a character from the episodic video game Deltarune, is an anthropomorphic bluebird. Following a battle against Berdly in Chapter 2, Lancer refers to him as the "bluebird of crappiness".

== Bluebirds in nature ==
Three species of blue-headed North American thrushes (Turdidae) occupy the genus Sialia. The most widespread and best-known is the eastern bluebird (Sialia sialis), breeding from Canada's prairie provinces to Texas and from the Maritimes to Florida; discrete populations of this species are also found from southeastern Arizona through west Mexico into Guatemala and Nicaragua. The mountain bluebird (S. currucoides) breeds on high-elevation plains from central Alaska to Arizona and New Mexico, and the western bluebird (S. mexicana) inhabits dry coniferous forests from extreme southwestern Canada to Baja California and from the Great Basin south into west Mexico. Other all-blue birds in North and Central America are the blue mockingbird, blue bunting, indigo bunting, blue grosbeak and a number of jays, including the blue jay.

Europe has only a few birds with conspicuous blue in the plumage, including the various blue tits of the genus Cyanistes and the common kingfisher. The adult male of the blue rock-thrush is the only European passerine with all-blue plumage; this species is best known from its literary treatment by Giacomo Leopardi, whose poem Il passero solitario makes of the rock-thrush a figure of the poet's isolation.

In South and Southeast Asia, the fairy-bluebirds, blue whistling thrush and verditer flycatcher are strikingly blue.

== Poems mentioning bluebirds ==
The world rolls round,—mistrust it not,—
Befalls again what once befell;
All things return, both sphere and mote,
And I shall hear my bluebird's note,
And dream the dream of Auburn dell.

— Ralph Waldo Emerson, May-Day, 1867

And when that day dawns, or sunset reddens how joyous we
shall all be! Facts will be regarded as discreditable, Truth will be
found mourning over her fetters, and Romance, with her temper
of wonder, will return to the land. The very aspect of the world
will change to our startled eyes. Out of the sea will rise
Behemoth and Leviathan, and sail round the high-pooped
galleys, as they do on the delightful maps of those ages when
books on geography were actually readable. Dragons will wander
about the waste places, and the phoenix will soar from her nest of
fire into the air. We shall lay our hands upon the basilisk, and see
the jewel in the toad’s head. Champing his gilded oats, the
Hippogriff will stand in our stalls, and over our heads will float
the Blue Bird singing of beautiful and impossible things, of
things that are lovely and that never happened, of things that are
not and that should be. But before this comes to pass we must
cultivate the lost art of Lying.

— Oscar Wilde, The Decay of Lying, 1891
