= The Old Maid and the Thief =

Radio opera by Gian Carlo Menotti

- Radio opera by Gian Carlo Menotti
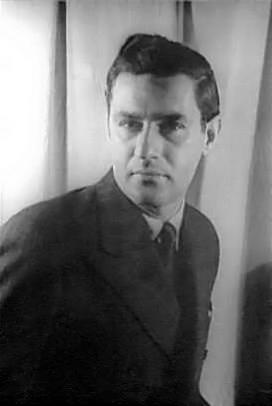
- The composer in 1944
- Librettist: Menotti
- Language: English
- Premiere: April 22, 1939; NBC Radio, New York

The Old Maid and the Thief is a radio opera in one act by Italian-American composer Gian Carlo Menotti. The work uses an English language libretto by the composer which tells a twisted tale of morals and evil womanly power. Menotti writes in the libretto "The devil couldn't do what a woman can – Make a thief out of an honest man."

Commissioned by NBC, The Old Maid and the Thief was one of the earliest operas composed specifically for performance on the radio. Menotti wrote the libretto to The Old Maid and the Thief himself; initially in Italian but with the intention of having the work translated into English for its premiere. It was the first of several operas in the English language by the young composer who was just 28 years old at the time. He was inspired to write the story of the opera after visiting the family of his partner Samuel Barber. He found that what seemed to be a quaint, cute town actually covered up a plethora of secrets about people and places.

Upon the opera's premiere in 1939, the work was received with wide enthusiasm by American music critics. The success of the opera helped further establish Menotti's career in the United States.

Menotti later adapted the opera slightly so it could be performed on the stage; with the first theatrical production given in Philadelphia in 1941. The staged version of the work proved to be successful as well, and the opera is still occasionally mounted by professional companies. It is also a popular repertoire choice by university opera programs in the United States.

== Composition ==
Rather than using the more contemporary through-composed style, Menotti chose to return to the 18th century opera buffa method of composing set numbers, a format which worked well on the radio. There are 14 short scenes, each preceded by a narrated "announcement", in keeping with the medium of radio (to be excluded if fully staged). The harmonic language is tonal and conservative. The radio announcements are included in the score, but it is also marked for stage direction.

The opera is most known for two arias. First, "What curse for a woman, is a timid man (Steal me, sweet thief)", is a full scene, where Laetitia sings of her affection for Bob, the bum. The other popular aria is "When the Air Sings of Summer", where Bob contemplates hitting the road. The arias are excerpted and available in the soprano and baritone volumes of G. Schirmer's American Arias.

== Performance history ==
The Old Maid and the Thief was premiered on NBC Radio on April 22, 1939 with Alberto Erede conducting the NBC Symphony Orchestra for the closing of the orchestra's 1938/1939 season. The opera was first staged in a slightly revised version by the Philadelphia Opera Company at the Academy of Music in Philadelphia on February 11, 1941, in a double bill with the United States premiere of Emil von Reznicek's Spiel oder Ernst?. The New York Philharmonic chose to program portions of the opera in 1942 with conductor Fritz Busch leading the ensemble. The first staged production in New York was presented by the New York City Opera in April 1948 in a double bill with Amelia Goes to the Ball, both operas directed by the composer, with Marie Powers as Miss Todd, Virginia MacWatters as Laetitia, Ellen Faull as Miss Pinkerton, and Norman Young as Bob. Other early stagings of the opera were given by the New England Opera Theater in Boston (1947), the Fort Worth Opera (1947), and the Chautauqua Opera (1951).

The opera was first staged in Europe at the National Theatre Mannheim in February 1947 using a German language translation by Maria Pinazzi. It was subsequently mounted by the Staatstheater Darmstadt (1951) and the Teatro Regio di Parma (1966) among other opera companies. More recently the opera was performed at London's Arcola Theatre as part of the 2008 Grimeborn Festival.

This opera is popular in the United States for colleges and workshop productions due to its English libretto, untaxing roles (since it is only in one act), and high musical value. The story and humor appeal to the modern American audience.

== Roles ==
Roles, voice types, premiere cast
Role	Voice type	Premiere cast April 22, 1939 Conductor: Alberto Erede	Premiere stage cast February 11, 1941 Conductor: Sylvan Levin
Miss Todd, Old Maid (unmarried)	mezzo-soprano or contralto	Mary Hoppel	Gabrielle Hunt
Bob, Wanderer (or Thief)	baritone	Robert Weede	Robert Gay
Laetitia, Miss Todd's Maid	soprano	Margaret Daum	Frances Greer
Miss Pinkerton, Miss Todd's Spinster Neighbor	soprano	Dorothy Sarnoff	Hilda Morse

== Synopsis ==
This one-act opera, divided into 14 scenes, is about an old maid, Miss Todd, who is a busybody in her small town. Though she is of high standing in her community, her love life has been bare for over forty years. Her housemaid Laetitia is a young, catty eavesdropper who is wary of becoming an Old Maid like her employer. Bob, a wanderer, comes to Miss Todd's door one afternoon while the town gossip, Miss Pinkerton is visiting. Enamored of his beauty, Laetitia easily convinces Miss Todd to let him stay. Laetitia then convinces Bob to stay by promising him more food and accommodations without any cost, and Bob remains in their house, as Miss Todd's "cousin Steve" to anyone who asks.

The next day, Miss Todd meets Miss Pinkerton in the street, and the latter tells her of an escaped convict who is reportedly in the area. The convict matches Bob's description, and Miss Todd runs home to warn Laetitia that they are harboring a thief and must get rid of him. Once again, Laetitia, insinuating that Bob is in love with her, convinces Miss Todd to let him stay. To keep him from running away and revealing them as accomplices, Miss Todd leaves money out for Bob to "steal". However, before long she needs more money, and resorts to stealing from her neighbors. Meanwhile, Laetitia is falling in love with the wanderer and sings "Steal Me Sweet Thief," an aria of her love for him, asking him to steal her away before time ravages and withers her looks. Miss Pinkerton soon encounters Miss Todd again and warns her to "Keep all the doors locked, keep all the windows closed," because the thief (in actuality, Miss Todd) is in town and has stolen from the neighbors. Miss Todd plays along, agreeing that the mysterious crimes point to the indubitable presence of a thief. At home, Bob is sick of confinement and plans to leave the next day. He sings "When the Air Sings of Summer" (Bob's Bedroom Aria) as he packs his bag. Laetitia stumbles upon him as he packs and, desperate, asks him what it will take to keep him there. Bob replies he would like to "have something to drink". Miss Todd, who, being a good prohibitionist, doesn't have any alcohol in the house, insists there would be a scandal if she were to be seen buying liquor. Laetitia cleverly convinces her that, since stealing and drinking are both sinful, breaking into a liquor store ("sinning against a sin") wouldn't be problematic, and they plan to rob the store that night.

The next day, Miss Pinkerton visits Miss Todd at home and informs her that the liquor store has been violated and the owner attacked. A drunken Bob interrupts their conversation, singing loudly upstairs, prompting the shrewd Miss Pinkerton to add that the police are going to search every house to find the thief. Miss Todd shoos Miss Pinkerton out the door, and then she and Laetitia confront Bob about his true identity. They each try to convince him to run off with them, in order to evade the police, but Bob refuses to run away because he has done nothing wrong. Miss Todd incredulously asks, "Is your love for me so small that you would see me in prison?" to which Bob replies, "Small? I don't love you at all!" Miss Todd flies into a rage, and storms out, saying she will call the police and blame all the theft on him. Glumly, Bob and Laetitia duet on whether to stay and face the charges or leave, and the persuasive Laetitia eventually wins the argument. Vindictively, they steal all of Miss Todd's valuables, including her car, and ride off together. Miss Todd returns to find her house empty and, realizing her life is now in ruins, collapses in grief after a final frantic aria.

== Recordings ==
Year	Cast: Miss Todd, Bob, Laetitia, Miss Pinkerton	Conductor, orchestra	Label
22 April 1939	Mary Hopple, Robert Weede, Margaret Daum, Dorothy Sarnoff	Alberto Erede, NBC Symphony Orchestra (live premiere)	Unique Opera Records UORC 141 (LP); Premiere Opera 1633-1 (CD); Omega Opera Archive 469 (CD)
1964	Elisabeth Höngen, Eberhard Waechter, Olive Moorefield, Hilde Konetzni	Wolfgang Rennert; Orchestra of the Vienna Volksoper, direction: Otto Schenk (in German) (for Bayerischer Rundfunk)	Published in 2010, Arthaus Musik Cat: 101515 (DVD)
1970	Anna Reynolds, John Reardon, Judith Blegen, Margaret Baker	Jorge Mester, Orchestra of the Teatro Verdi di Trieste	Mercury Records
2007	Natalie Arduino, Blake Davidson, Nicole Franklin, Lynn Parr Mock	Victoria Bond, Lone Spring Arts Orchestra	Albany Records; CD: Cat. TROY990
