= Robert Mayer (philanthropist) =

German-born British philanthropist and businessman (1879–1985)

Sir Robert Mayer CH KCVO
- Born: 5 June 1879; Mannheim, Grand Duchy of Baden, German Empire
- Died: 9 January 1985 (aged 105)
- Occupation: Businessman
- Known for: Philanthropist
- Spouse: Dorothy Moulton Piper
- Children: 3
- Awards: Albert Medal (1979)

Sir Robert Mayer CH KCVO (5 June 1879 – 9 January 1985) was a German-born British philanthropist, businessman, and a major supporter of music and young musicians.

== Early life ==
Mayer was born in Mannheim, Germany; his father was a brewer. From the age of 5 Mayer attended the Mannheim conservatoire, where, at the age of 11, he prepared a piano ballade by Brahms but was not chosen to perform it before the composer. However, he sat next to Brahms during the concert. He also studied under Felix Weingartner.

His father, however, insisted that Mayer go into business. Initially he worked in the lace trade, and then, moving to London in 1896, became a banker, whilst continuing his piano studies with Fanny Davies and others.

Mayer became a citizen of the United Kingdom in 1902, and joined the British army in the First World War.

== Personal life ==
His first wife, the soprano Dorothy Moulton Piper (d. 1974), an avant garde singer whom he married in 1919, encouraged him to continue his interest in music. Early in their married life, whilst living in the United States, Mayer came across the children's concerts organised by Walter Damrosch, and he was inspired by these to found the Children's Concerts, later known as the Robert Mayer Concerts for Children, in 1923 (and later set up 'Youth and Music', founded in 1954, and affiliated to Jeunesses Musicales). The first series of concerts were conducted by Adrian Boult and Malcolm Sargent.

Mayer had three children, two of whom would go on to survive him: Adrian and Pauline. In 1980, aged 101, he remarried to Lady Jacqueline Mayer Noble.

== Founding ==
In 1932, Mayer was one of the founders of the London Philharmonic Orchestra, and he also helped found the London Schools Symphony Orchestra in 1951. He was also involved, with Egon Wellesz, with the founding of the ISCM.

== Centenarian ==
His 100th birthday in 1979 was a national celebration that included a gala concert at the Royal Festival Hall which was attended by Queen Elizabeth II. On the day of his 100th birthday he was a guest on the BBC's radio programme Desert Island Discs. His song choices were:

- Sonata In F Major, Beethoven
- Selig wie die Sonne (from Die Meistersinger von Nürnberg), Wagner
- I'm off to Chez Maxim's (from The Merry Widow), Lehár
- Dies irae (from Requiem Mass), Verdi
- Piano Sonata No. 21 in B flat major, D960, Schubert
- Concerto for Orchestra, Bartók

His castaway's favourites were:

- An die Musik (To Music), D547, Schubert
- Sinfonia Concertante In E Flat Major, Mozart

Later in that year Mayer, joined by Joyce Grenfell and Robin Ray, appeared as a guest on the BBC TV quiz Face the Music.

The Royal Philharmonic Orchestra under Bernard Keeffe played music by Ludwig van Beethoven, Benjamin Britten, Malcolm Arnold and Jean Sibelius, the most requested works as the result of a poll.

Although Chaim Weizmann referred to him as "an assimilated Jew", Mayer replied "I am a man, not a Jew or a non-Jew".

== Autobiography ==
Mayer published an autobiography titled My First 100 Years in 1979.

== National order ==
He was created a Knight Bachelor by George VI in 1939, and was created a Member of the Order of the Companions of Honour (CH) by Elizabeth II in 1973. He was made a Knight Commander of the Royal Victorian Order (KCVO) by the Queen in 1979.
