= Gabrielle Hunt =

American singer and teacher (1913–1984)

Vivian Greenstein Ferleger Kresch, known on the stage as Gabrielle Hunt (4 September 1913 – 2 December 1984), was an American contralto and voice teacher. She trained under Estelle Liebling at the Curtis Institute of Music and was a leading performer with the Philadelphia Opera Company in the early 1940s. She is best remembered for performing the role of Miss Todd in the first staging of Gian Carlo Menotti's The Old Maid and the Thief in 1941, and later as a celebrated singing teacher at first the Philadelphia Conservatory of Music and then the Settlement Music School. She also created the role of Dolores in the world premiere of Deems Taylor's Ramuntcho in 1942.

== Life and career ==
The daughter of Alfred R Greenstein and Harriet E Magell, Vivian G. F. Kresch was born in Philadelphia, Pennsylvania with the name Vivian Hilda Greenstein on 4 September 1913. She was educated in her native city at Simon Gratz High School and the Curtis Institute of Music (CIM); graduating from the school in 1938. At Curtis she studied singing with Estelle Liebling. When the world premiere of Gian Carlo Menotti's Amelia Goes to the Ball was given at CIM on April 1, 1937, she was listed under the name Gabrielle Hunt as a member of the opera chorus. In 1938 she married Herbert R Ferleger. They had three children: Laurence, Donald, and Carol.

Hunt was a leading contralto with the Philadelphia Opera Company (POC). With the POC she notably performed the role of Miss Todd in the first staging of Gian Carlo Menotti's The Old Maid and the Thief in 1941; an opera which had previously only been performed on a radio broadcast. She also created the role of Dolores in the world premiere of Deems Taylor's Ramuntcho at the Academy of Music on February 10, 1942. Her other repertoire with the POC included Mercédès in Carmen (1940), Olga in Eugene Onegin (1940), Marthe Schwerlein in Charles Gounod's Faust (1941), Geneviève in Pelléas et Mélisande (1941), Marcellina in The Marriage of Figaro (1941), Annina in Der Rosenkavalier (1941), She toured to the Boston Opera House with the POC in 1942 where she repeated the roles of Marcellina and Geneviève.

In 1944 Hunt gave a recital of music by Claude Debussy with pianist Rafael de Silva that was sponsored by the Philadelphia Art Alliance (PAA). Later that year she gave a recital at the Brooklyn Museum. She sang in concerts again with the PAA in 1945.

== Later life ==
After retiring from the stage, Kresch was a celebrated voice teacher in Philadelphia where she had a lengthy career first on the faculty of the Philadelphia Conservatory of Music (appointed to faculty in 1945, school later the renamed University of the Arts) and then the Settlement Music School. She lived in Wyncote, Pennsylvania. She died on December 2, 1984, at the Fox Chase Cancer Center in Philadelphia.

Kresch's brother, Morris Hunt, was married to soprano Lois Hunt.
