= Philadelphia Opera Company =

The Philadelphia Opera Company was the name of two different American opera companies active during the twentieth century in Philadelphia, Pennsylvania. The first company was founded by impresario Oscar Hammerstein I in 1908. That company disbanded only two years later as a result of financial problems. The second company was founded by conductor Sylvan Levin in 1938 and was active for six years before it too closed due to financial reasons in 1944.

== Hammerstein's Philadelphia Opera Company: 1908-1910 ==
In 1907, Oscar Hammerstein I hired architect William H. McElfatrick of the firm J.B. McElfatrick & Son to design a new opera house for the city of Philadelphia. The plans were approved and in 1908 the Philadelphia Opera House was built over the course of just a few months at 858 North Broad Street. The structure was built specifically for Hammerstein's latest artistic venture, his new opera company, the Philadelphia Opera Company (POC).

Notable singers to have performed with the POC during its short history include Lina Cavalieri, Armand Crabbé, David Devriès, Hector Dufranne, Minnie Egener, Mary Garden, Alice Gentle, Jeanne Gerville-Réache, Gustave Huberdeau, John McCormack, Carmen Melis, Maurice Renaud, Mario Sammarco, Marguerite Sylva, Emma Trentini, Emilio Venturini, Giovanni Zenatello, and Nicola Zerola.

== Levin's Philadelphia Opera Company: 1938-1944 ==
In 1938, Sylvan Levin founded the second Philadelphia Opera Company, serving as its artistic director and principal conductor for the next six years. The company mounted almost all of its productions at the Academy of Music in Philadelphia until its last season when it staged its productions at the Erlanger Theatre. The POC's first performance was of Giacomo Puccini's La bohème on January 19, 1939, with Barbara Thorne as Mimì, Fritz Krueger as Rodolfo, Frank Cappelli as Marcello, Frances Greer as Musetta, and Levin conducting. The company's last performance was of Johann Strauss II's Die Fledermaus on February 18, 1944, with Robert Stuart as Alfred, Jayne Cozzens as Adele, Helena Bliss as Rosalinde, and Joseph Laderoute as Gabriel von Eisenstein. Highlights in the POC's performance history were the first staged production of Gian Carlo Menotti's The Old Maid and the Thief in February 1941 with Gabrielle Hunt as Miss Todd, and the world premiere of Deems Taylor's Ramuntcho on February 10, 1942.
