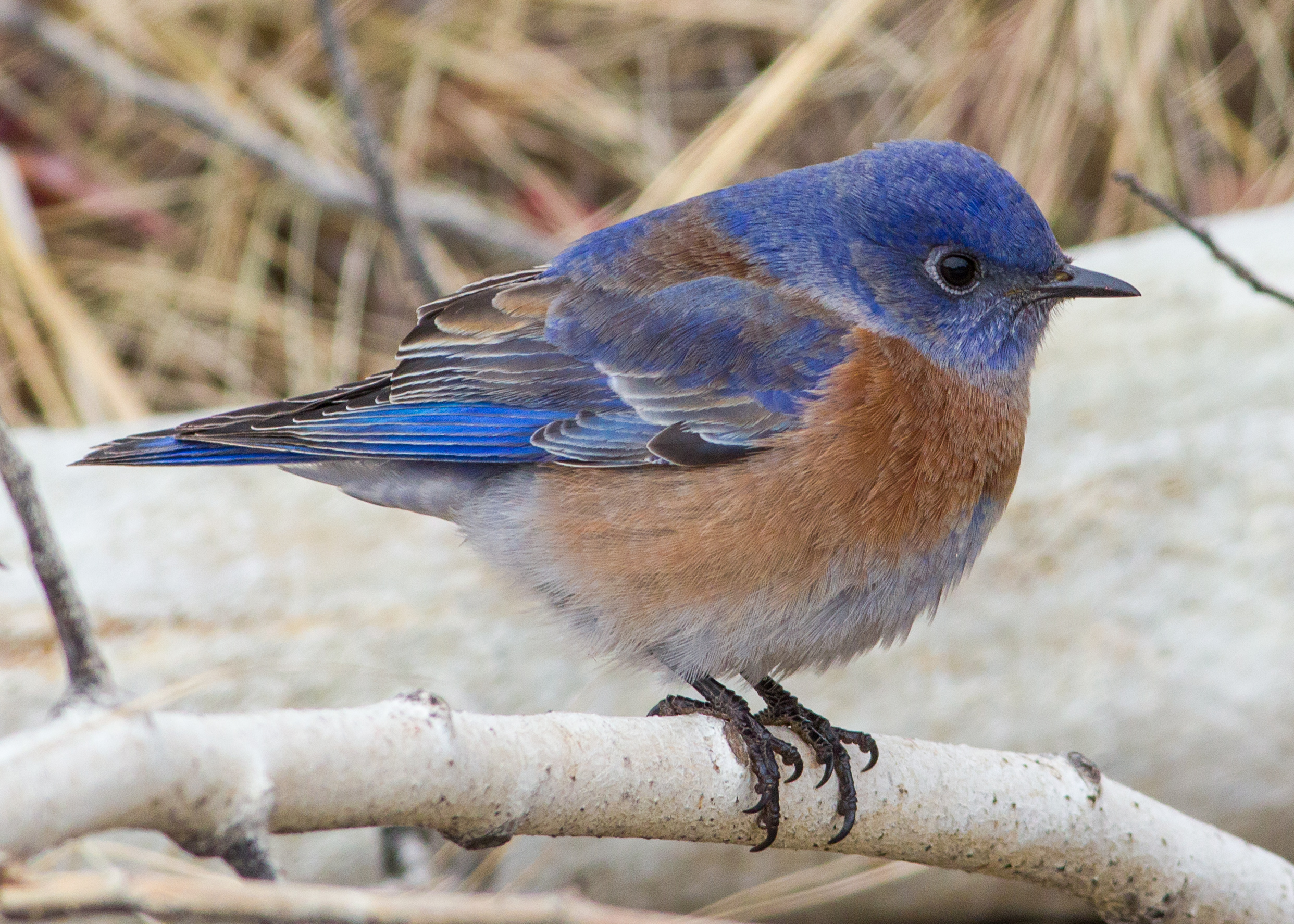
- Adult male
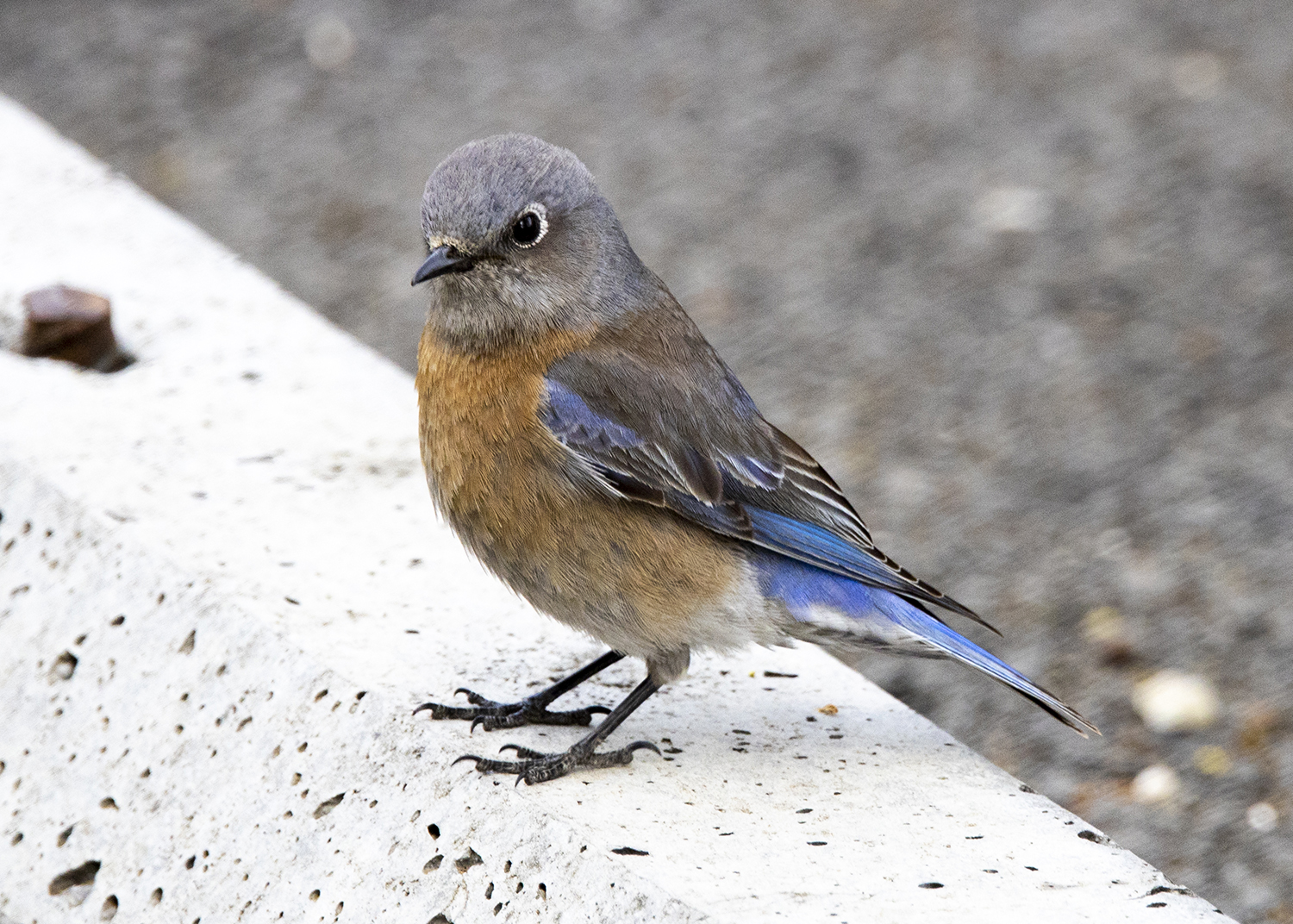
- Adult female

Conservation status
- Least Concern (IUCN 3.1)

Scientific classification
- Kingdom: Animalia
- Phylum: Chordata
- Class: Aves
- Order: Passeriformes
- Family: Turdidae
- Genus: Sialia
- Species: S. mexicana

Binomial name
- Sialia mexicana Swainson, 1832
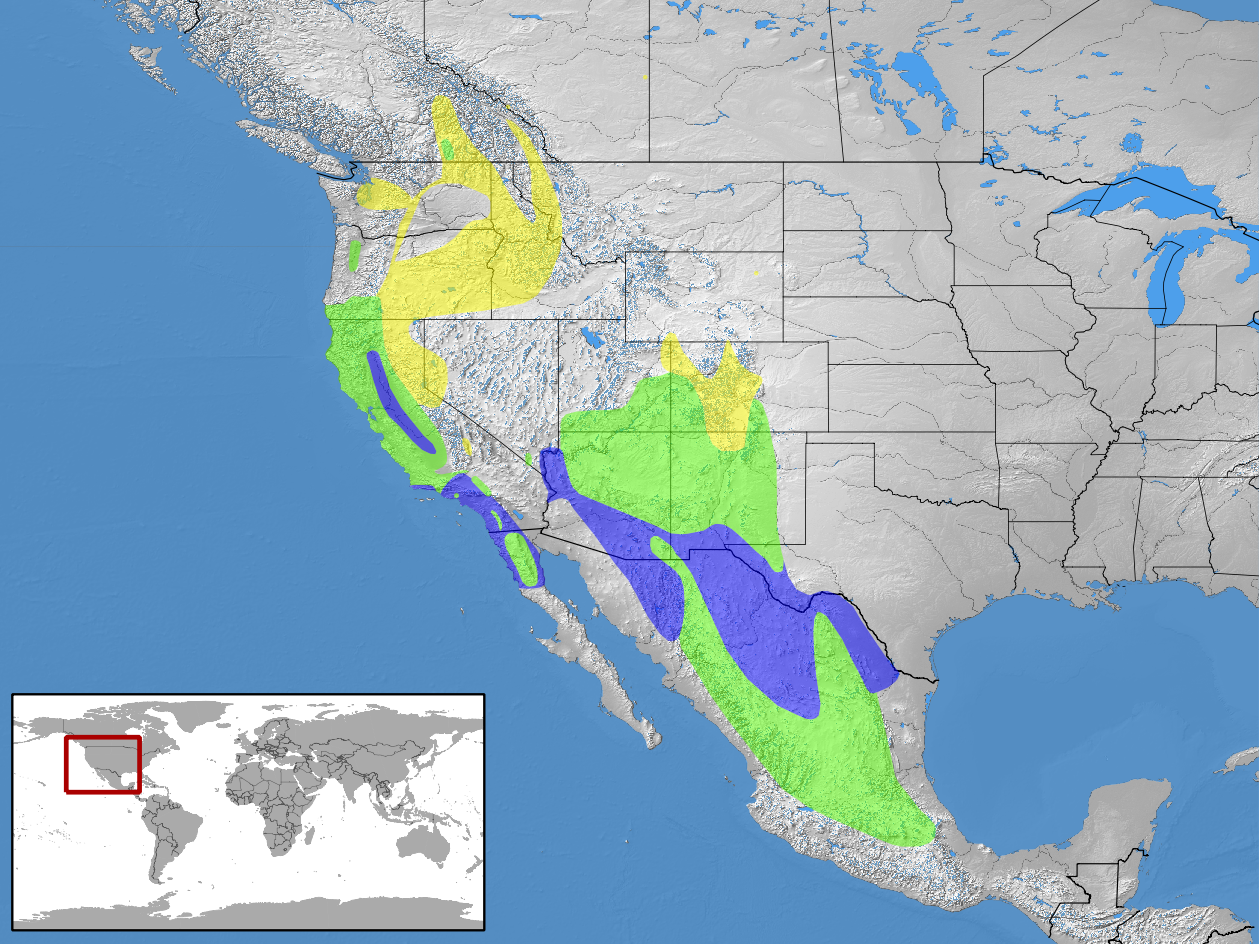
- Range of S. mexicana Breeding range Year-round range Wintering range

= Western bluebird =

Species of bird

The western bluebird (Sialia mexicana) is a small North American thrush.

== Taxonomy ==
The western bluebird was formally described by the English naturalist William Swainson in 1832 and given the binomial name Sialia mexicana.

Six subspecies are recognized:

- S. m. occidentalis Townsend, JK, 1837 – southwest Canada to north Baja California (northwest Mexico)
- S. m. bairdi Ridgway, 1894 – interior west USA to Sonora and Chihuahua (northwest Mexico)
- S. m. jacoti Phillips, AR, 1991 – south central USA and northeast Mexico
- S. m. amabilis Moore, RT, 1939 – northcentral Mexico
- S. m. nelsoni Phillips, AR, 1991 – central Mexico
- S. m. mexicana Swainson, 1832 – south central Mexico

== Description ==
The western bluebird is a small stocky bird with a length of 15 to 18 cm (5.9 to 7.1 in). The adult male is bright blue on top and on the throat with an orange breast and sides, a brownish patch on back, and a gray belly and undertail coverts. The adult female has a duller blue body, wings, and tail, a gray throat, a dull orange breast, and a gray belly and undertail coverts. Both sexes have a thin straight bill with a fairly short tail. Immature birds have duller colors than the adults, and have spots on their chest and back.

Their calling consists of the mating songs which sound like "cheer," "chur-chur," and "chup." This helps male western bluebirds find the females easily in condensed forest. The males use these calls to tell competing males that the territory belongs to them.

The western bluebird can be readily distinguished from the two other species in the bluebird genus. The western bluebird has a blue (male) or gray (female) throat, the eastern bluebird (Sialia sialis) has an orange throat, and the mountain bluebird (Sialia currucoides) lacks orange color anywhere on its body.

== Distribution and habitat ==
The western bluebird has been displaced from its natural habitat by the felling of trees; however it has adapted to coniferous forests, farmlands, semi-open terrain, and desert to survive. The year-round range includes California, the southern Rocky Mountains, Arizona, and New Mexico in the United States, and as far south as the states of Oaxaca and Veracruz in Mexico. The summer breeding range extends as far north as the Pacific Northwest, British Columbia, and Montana. Northern birds can migrate to the southern parts of the range; southern birds are often permanent residents.

== Behaviour and ecology ==
=== Breeding ===
The western bluebird nests in cavities or in nest boxes, competing with tree swallows, house sparrows, and European starlings for natural nesting locations. Because of the high level of competition, house sparrows often attack western bluebirds for their nests. The attacks are made both in groups or alone. Attacks by starlings can be reduced if the nesting box opening is kept to 1.5 in (38 mm) diameter to avoid takeover. Nest boxes come into effect when the species is limited and dying out due to the following predators: cats, raccoons, opossums, and select birds of prey such as the Cooper's hawk. Ants, bees, earwigs, and wasps can crawl into the nesting boxes and damage the newborns. Western bluebirds are among the birds that nest in cavities, or holes in trees, or nest boxes. Their beaks are too weak and small to dig out their own holes, so they rely on woodpeckers to make their nest sites for them.

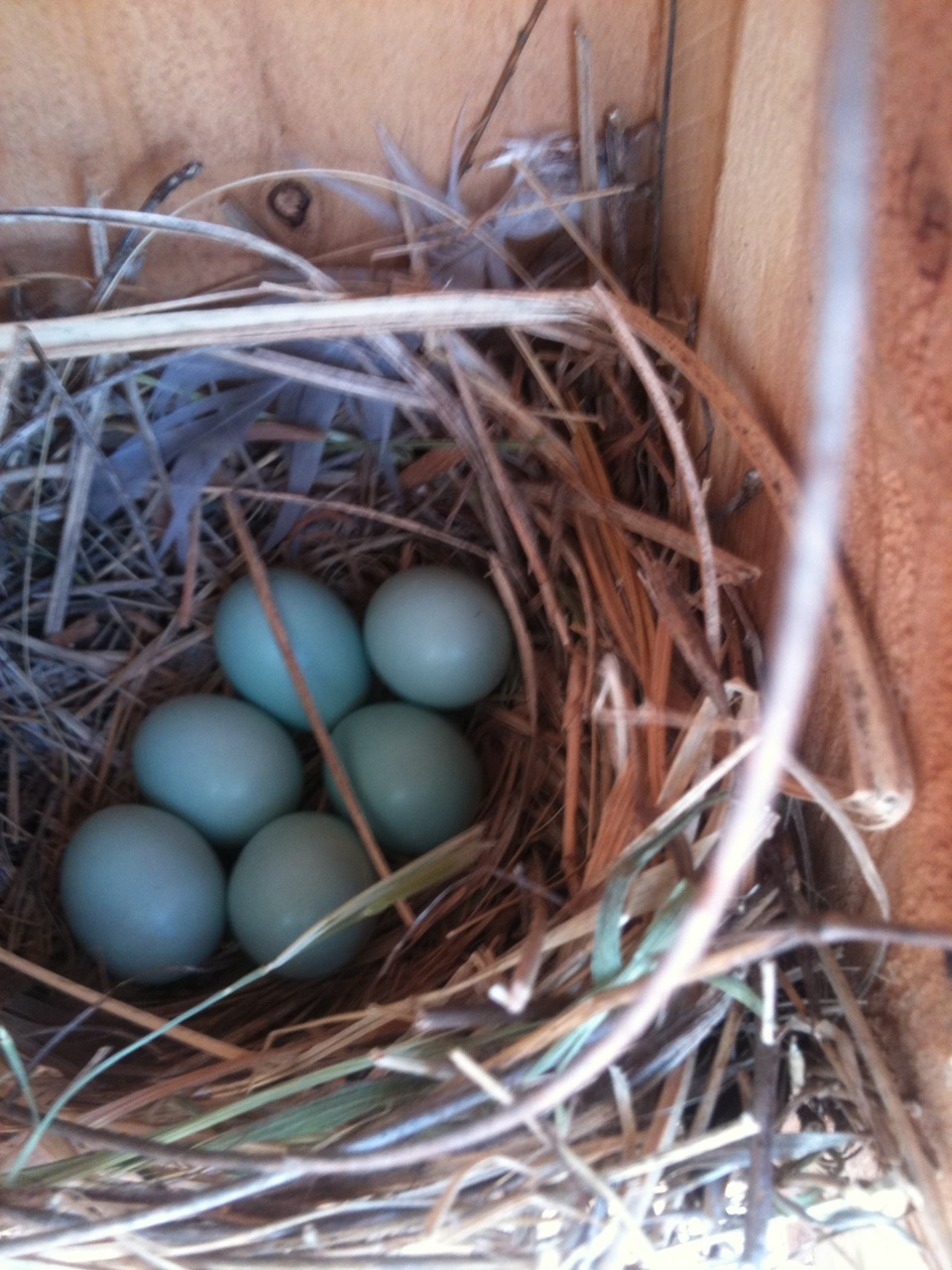
Nest in a nest box

In restored forests, western bluebirds have a higher probability of successfully fledging young than in untreated forests, but they are at greater risk of parasitic infestations. The effects on post-fledging survival are unknown. They have been found to enjoy more success with nest boxes than in natural cavities. They started egg-laying earlier, had higher nesting success and lower predation rates, and fledged more young in boxes than in cavities, but they did not have larger clutches of eggs. The eggs are commonly two to eight per clutch, with average size 20.8 mm × 16.2 mm (0.82 in × 0.64 in). Eggs are oval in shape with a smooth and glossy shell. They are pale blue to bluish-white and sometimes white in color. Nestlings remain in a nest about 19 to 22 days before fledging. In a good year, the parents can rear two broods, with four to six eggs per clutch. According to genetic studies, 45% of western bluebirds' nests carried young that were not offspring of the male partner. In addition, they help their parents raise a new brood after their own nest fails.

=== Food and feeding ===
The western bluebird pounces on the ground when looking for food, such as worms and berries. It also flies to catch aerial prey, like insects, when available. The western bluebird consumes water from nearby streams and commonly use bird baths. These birds wait on a perch and fly down to catch insects, sometimes catching them in midair. They mainly eat insects and berries, and will regularly come to bird feeders if mealworms or other insects are supplied.

== Gallery ==
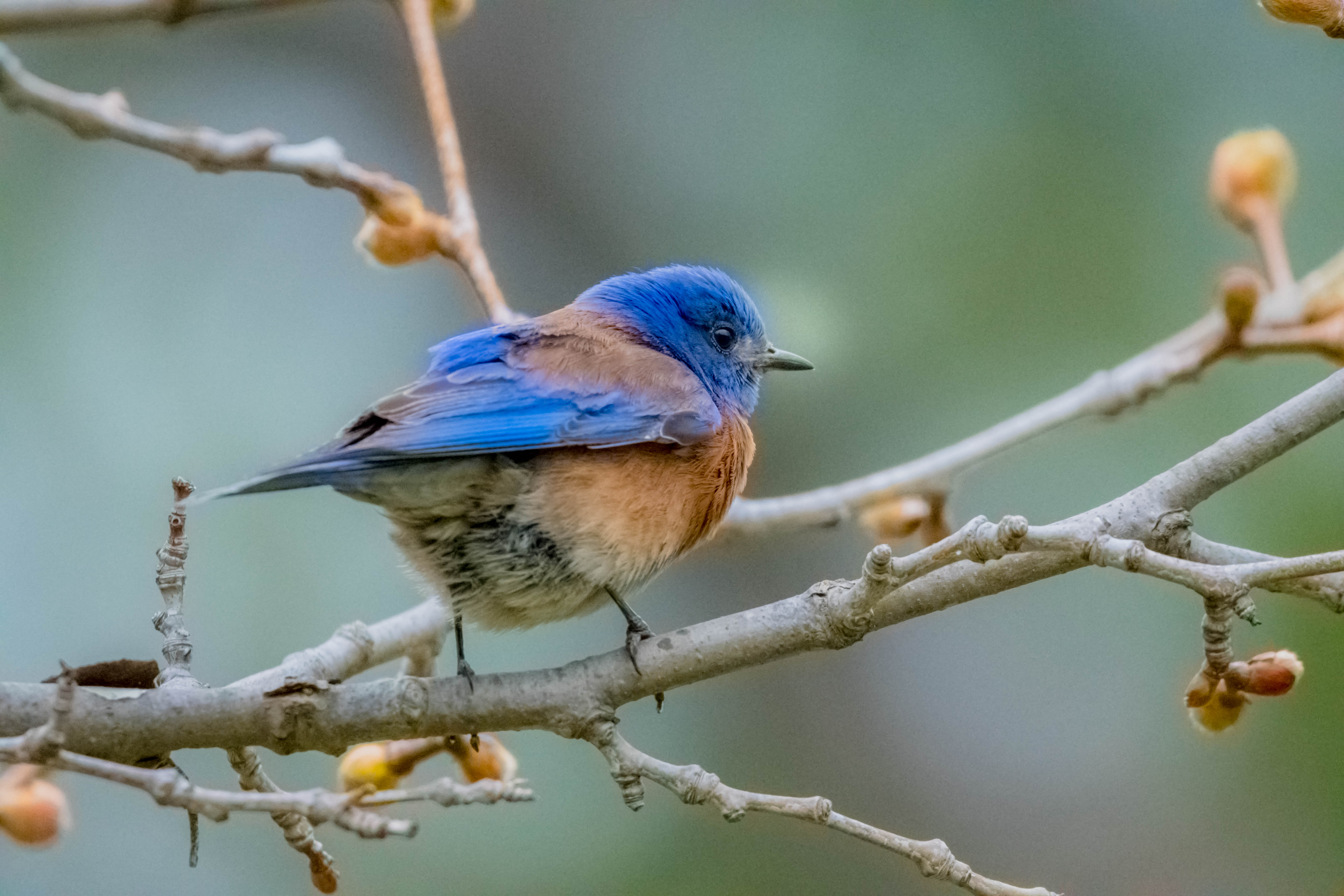
Western Bluebird in Los Gatos, California

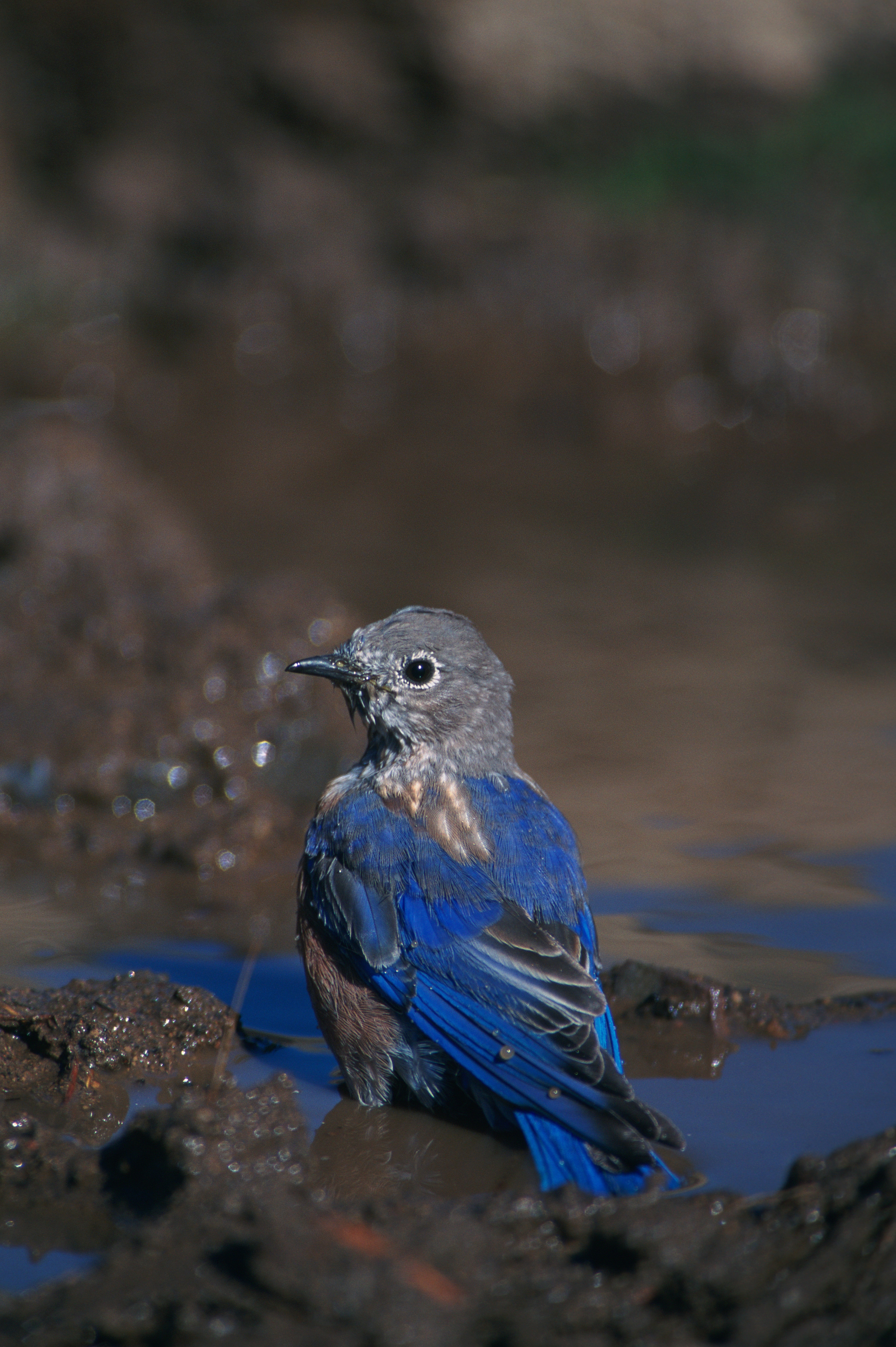
Juvenile western bluebird in Arizona

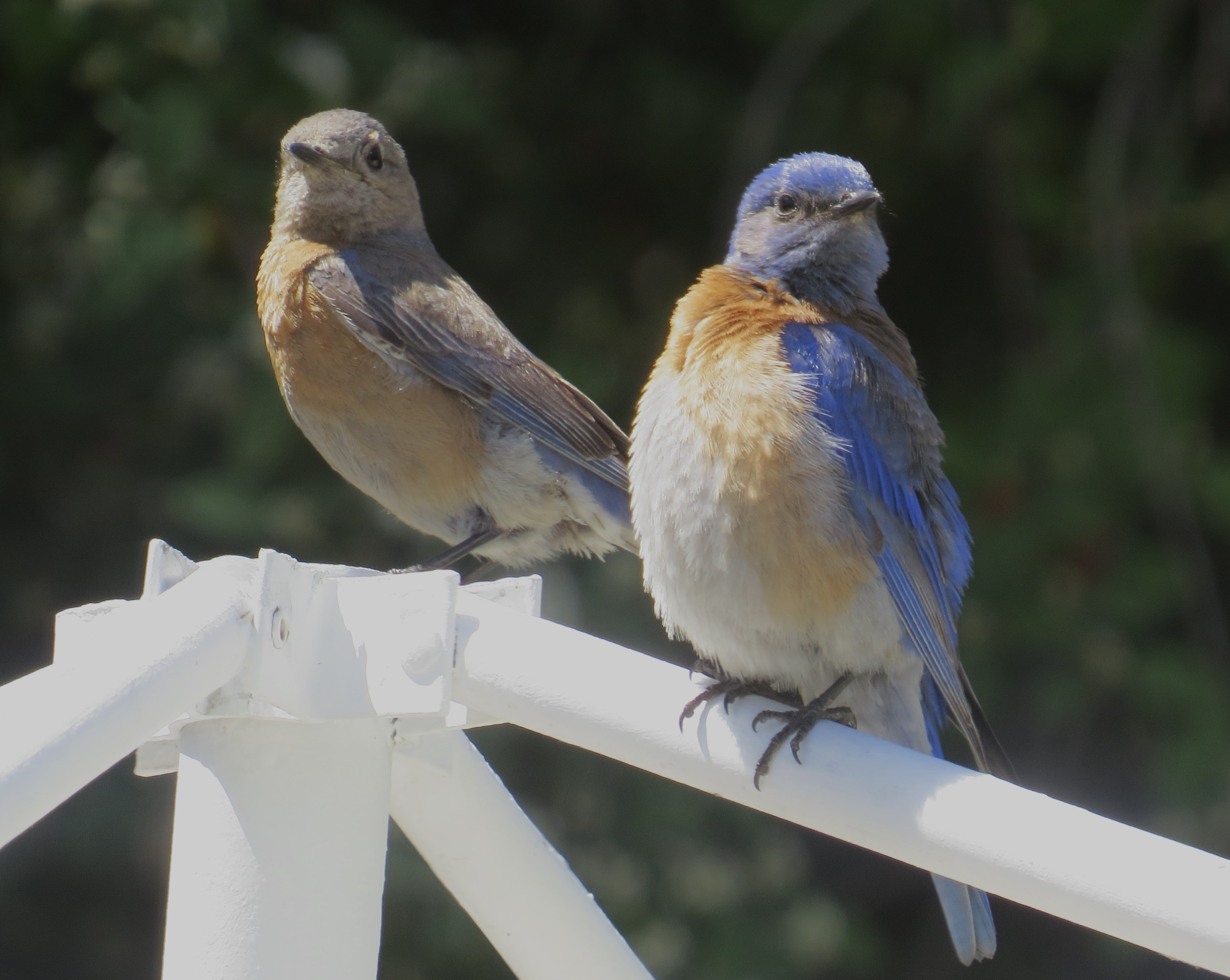
Male and female blue bird pair

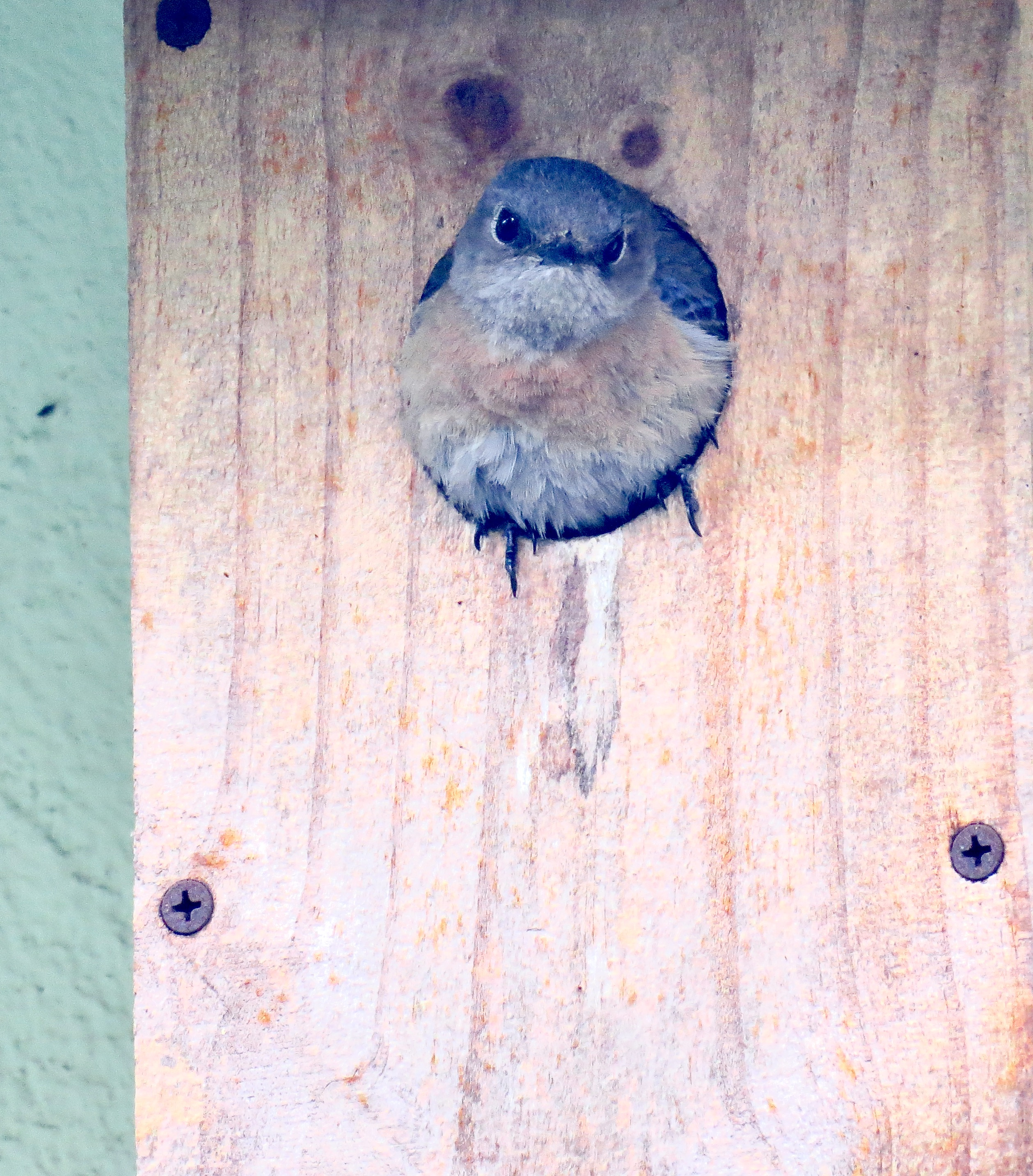
Western blue bird in birdhouse

== Similar species ==
- Eastern bluebird (Sialia sialis)
- Mountain bluebird (Sialia currucoides)

== See also ==
- Bluebird of happiness
