= Frances Greer =

American opera singer

Frances Greer

Frances Greer (12 January 1917 – 28 June 2005) was an American soprano. A leading performer at the Metropolitan Opera and the Philadelphia Opera Company, she recorded 13 albums, mostly musical operettas with RCA Victor, and made several concert appearances at Carnegie Hall. For many years she was the featured singer on CBS’s Friday evening radio program, Musicland USA.

== Life and career ==
Greer was born in Piggott, Arkansas, the eldest of seven children to Charles F. Greer and Narene Greer (née Spence). Later the family moved to Helena, Arkansas where Frances attended West Helena High School. Her father was a music teacher and it was from him that she received her first voice lessons. Although she won several state vocal competitions while in high school, Greer never received a response after submitting her grades and a letter to the University of Arkansas. She hoped to study at the school, and the lack of a response hurt her feelings. However, she did win three different scholarships to Louisiana State University. At LSU she studied voice, was a member of Phi Mu sorority, and was highly active in student opera productions that were at that time directed by baritone Pasquale Amato. While a student, Greer won a major singing contest which led to an engagement to perform as a soloist with the Philadelphia Orchestra under conductor Eugene Ormandy.

After graduating from LSU, Greer joined the roster of principal artists at the Philadelphia Opera Company (POC), making her debut with the company on January 19, 1939 as Musetta in Giacomo Puccini's La bohème. She remained with the company through 1941, portraying such roles as Adele in Die Fledermaus, Cio-cio-san in Madama Butterfly, Concepcion in L’heure espagnole, Frasquita in Carmen, Giorgetta in Il tabarro, Mařenka in The Bartered Bride, Marguerite in Faust, Méliande in Pelléas et Mélisande, and Susanna in The Marriage of Figaro. She notably appeared in the first staged production of Gian Carlo Menotti's The Old Maid and the Thief in the role of Laetitia with the POC at the Academy of Music on February 11, 1941. Among the conductors she sang under while in Philadelphia were Sir Thomas Beecham, Bruno Walter, and Sylvan Levin.

In 1942 Greer left the POC to join the roster of performers at the Metropolitan Opera in New York City. She made her debut at the house as Musetta on November 30, 1942 with Grace Moore as Mimì, Frederick Jagel as Rodolfo, Frank Valentino as Marcello, and Cesare Sodero conducting. She remained at the Met for the next 8 years, performing such roles as Ellen in Lakmé, the High Priestess in Aida, Frasquita, Marzelline in Fidelio, Nannetta in Falstaff, Nella in Gianni Schicchi, Oscar in Un ballo in maschera, Poussette in Manon, Stéphano in Roméo et Juliette, Susanna, Xenia in Boris Godunov, and Zerlina in Don Giovanni. Her final performance at the Met was on February 7, 1950 as Musetta with Bidu Sayão as Mimì, Giuseppe Di Stefano as Rodolfo, Frank Valentino as Marcello, and Giuseppe Antonicelli conducting.

In 1954 Greer joined the voice faculty of the University of Michigan School of Music, Theatre & Dance at the invitation of Earl V. Moore, then Dean of the School. She taught at the school through 1962 and while there often gave recitals accompanied by Eugene Bossart. Shortly after arriving at the university, she met industrialist Frederick C. Matthaei who was then a Regent at the school. The two began a romantic relationship and eventually married. She died in Ann Arbor, Michigan at the age of 88.
