= Dorothy Moulton Mayer =

English soprano, philanthropist, peace activist and biographer (1886–1974)

Lady Mayer
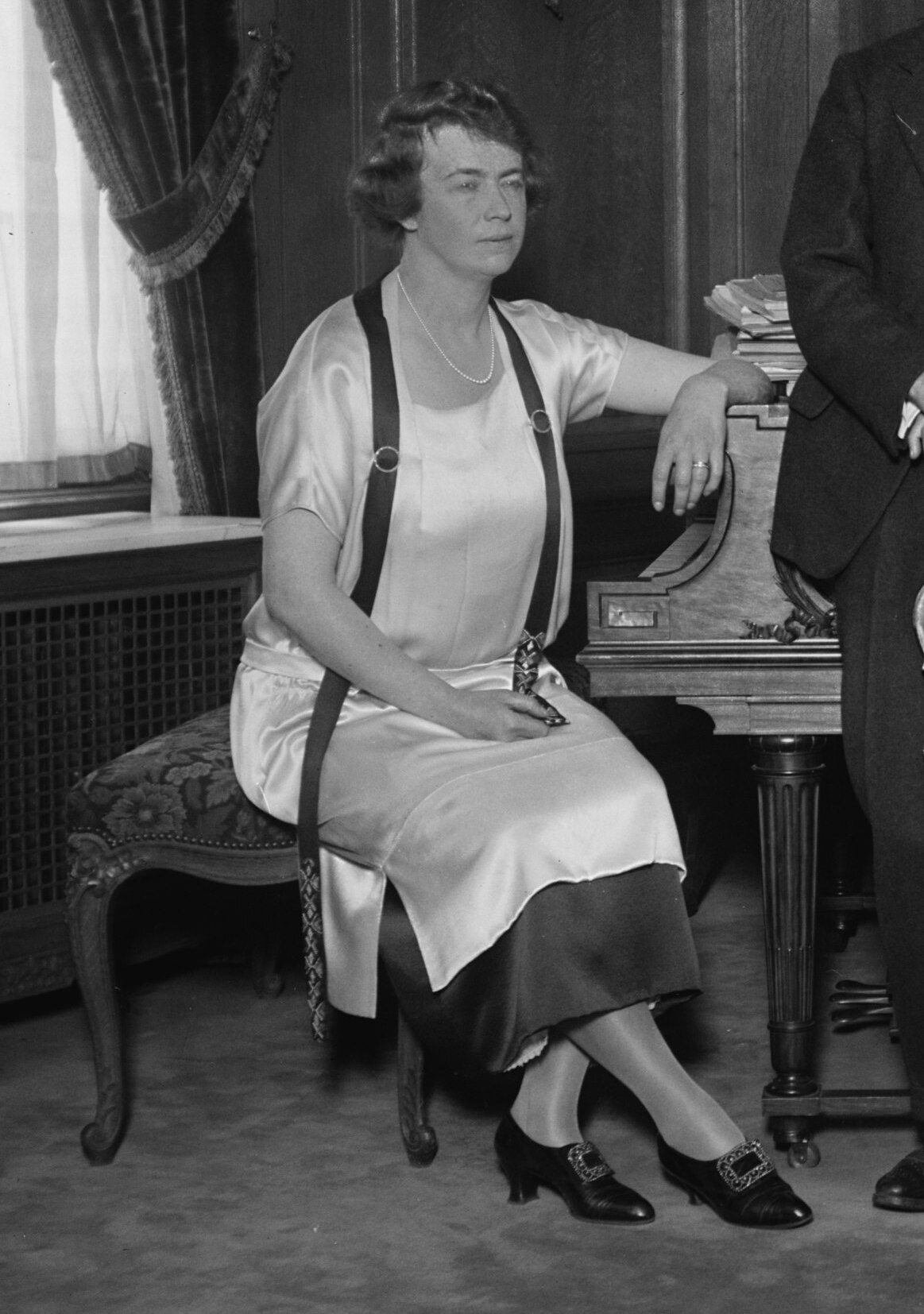
- Born: Dorothy Moulton Piper; 1886; London, England
- Died: 1974 (aged 87–88)
- Occupations: singer, philanthropist, writer, activist
- Organization: Women's International League for Peace and Freedom (WILPF)
- Spouse: Sir Robert Mayer (m. 1919)
- Children: 3

Dorothy Moulton Mayer, Lady Mayer (née Piper, 1886–1974) was an English soprano, philanthropist, peace activist and biographer.

== Family ==
Mayer was born in 1886 in Crouch End, London, England. Her father was George Piper OBE, a civil servant at the London War Office. In 1919, she married the German-born businessman, banker and philanthropist Robert Mayer. They had a daughter and two sons. In 1939, her husband was knighted.

== Career ==
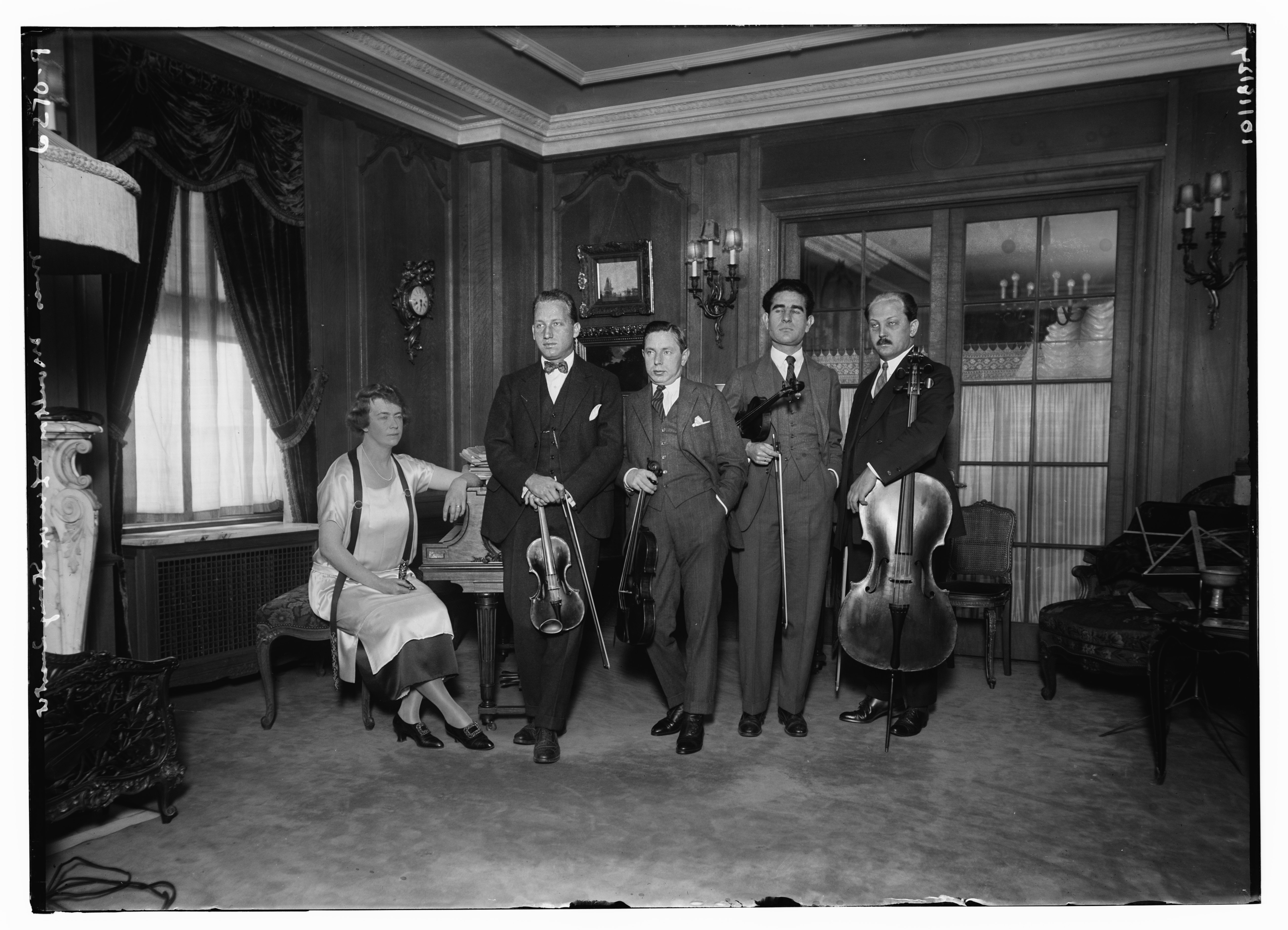
Mayer (seated) with Sandor Harmati, Nicholas Moldavan, Wolfe Wolfinsohn and Emmeran Stoeber of the Lennox String Quartet, 1924

Mayer was an operatic and concert soprano. After completing her singing studies as a student of German tenor Raimund von zur-Mühlen, she performed in England before becoming an internationally known professional singer in Vienna in 1923. She was then engaged in Salzburg, Budapest and America. Mayer was an advocate for contemporary European composition, performing new works by German and Austrian composers, such Egon Wellesz, in Britain, and giving first performances of composers who were in the early stages of their musical careers. Mayer was one of the first British singers to perform works by Russian composer Igor Stravinsky and Austrian composer Arnold Schoenberg, and hosted Hungarian Béla Bartók as a guest of honour. For her introductions of European musicians to Britainm Mayer was described in the classical music magazine Musical Opinion as "something of a musical crusader."

Together with her husband, Mayer also devoted herself to promoting young musicians and in 1923 they founded the "Orchestral Concerts for Children" together. The first series of concerts were conducted by Adrian Boult and Malcolm Sargent and they were later run by the BBC.

Mayer was also a peace advocate and was vice president of the British section of the Women's International League for Peace and Freedom (WILPF). She attended the inaugural Zagreb Conference for Peace and International Cooperation in Zagreb, Yugoslavia. In 1940, she travelled with her husband to America where they served as representatives of the charity Save the Children.

== Later life ==
When Mayer was in her fifties she began writing biographies of historic figures. Her biographies included Louise of Savoy, Marie Antoinette, Angelica Kauffman and the violin virtuoso Louis Spohr.

Mayer died in 1974.

== Select publications ==
- The Forgotten Master. The life & times of Louis Spohr (1959)
- The Great Regent: Louise of Savoy 1476–1531 (1966)
- Marie Antoinette: The Tragic Queen (1969)
- Angelica Kauffmann, R.A., 1741–1807 (1972)
