= Tales of the Cochiti Indians =

Tales of the Cochiti Indians is a 1931 work by Ruth Benedict. It collects the folk tales of the Cochiti Puebloan peoples in New Mexico. The book is considered an important work in the discipline of feminist anthropology. Following development of the "culture and personality" school of anthropology by her colleague Edward Sapir and influenced by Margaret Mead, Benedict sought psychological patterns in the stories she collected.

== Background ==
After her Columbia University mentor Franz Boas received funding for Project #35 to document cultures of the North and South American Indians, Benedict spent 11 years gathering materials on site. Because she was partially deaf, she worked through interpreters. She collected hundreds of pages of myths and tales at Zuni in 1924 and 1925 and at Cochiti in 1925. She published Tales of the Cochiti Indians in 1931 and her work on the Zuni four years later.

With both tribes, she worked most closely with an older man considered the group's outstanding intellectual. Identified as "Informant 4" in Tales of the Cochiti Indians, her key informant's name was Santiago Quintana, widely referred to in the village as "mucho sabio." His granddaughter was potter Helen Cordero, who also drew from his stories to renew the lost art of Cochiti pottery.
