= Bluebird of Happiness (song) =

Song by Jan Peerce
- Published: 1934
- Recorded: 1936 (version 1)
- Composer(s): Sandor Harmati
- Lyricist(s): Edward Heyman, Harry Parr-Davies

"Bluebird of Happiness" is a song composed in 1934 by Sandor Harmati, with words by Edward Heyman and additional lyrics by Harry Parr-Davies.

Harmati wrote the song for his friend, the tenor Jan Peerce, the leading singer at Radio City Music Hall. Peerce recorded it three times: in 1936, under the name Paul Robinson, with the Radio City Music Hall Orchestra conducted by Ernö Rapée; on June 7, 1945, under his own name, with the RCA Victor Symphony Orchestra conducted by Sylvan Levin; and in 1958 (the Las Vegas version) with Joe Reisman and his Orchestra. Each version included slight variations in the spoken recitative, which was accompanied by Boldi's "Chanson Bohemienne", rather than Harmati's music.

The 1945 recording became a worldwide hit for Peerce, outselling all his many operatic recordings, and becoming second only to Enrico Caruso's 1918 recording of George M. Cohan's "Over There" among the best-selling RCA Victor records made by opera and concert singers. The 1958 version was the one Peerce used in later live performances.

== Art Mooney, Jimmy Durante and others ==
There was also a popular 1948 record by Art Mooney and his Orchestra.

Jimmy Durante covered the song in 1963 with his own modified lyrics.

Other singers have covered the song, but it remains Jan Peerce's signature tune and is firmly associated with him.
