= Sandor Harmati =

Hungarian-American violinist, conductor and composer

Sandor Harmati (9 July 1892 – 4 April 1936) was a Hungarian-American violinist, conductor and composer, best known for his song "Bluebird of Happiness" written in 1934 for Jan Peerce.

== Biography ==
Sandor Harmati (Harmati Sándor in Hungarian orthography) was born into a Jewish family in Budapest on 9 July 1892.

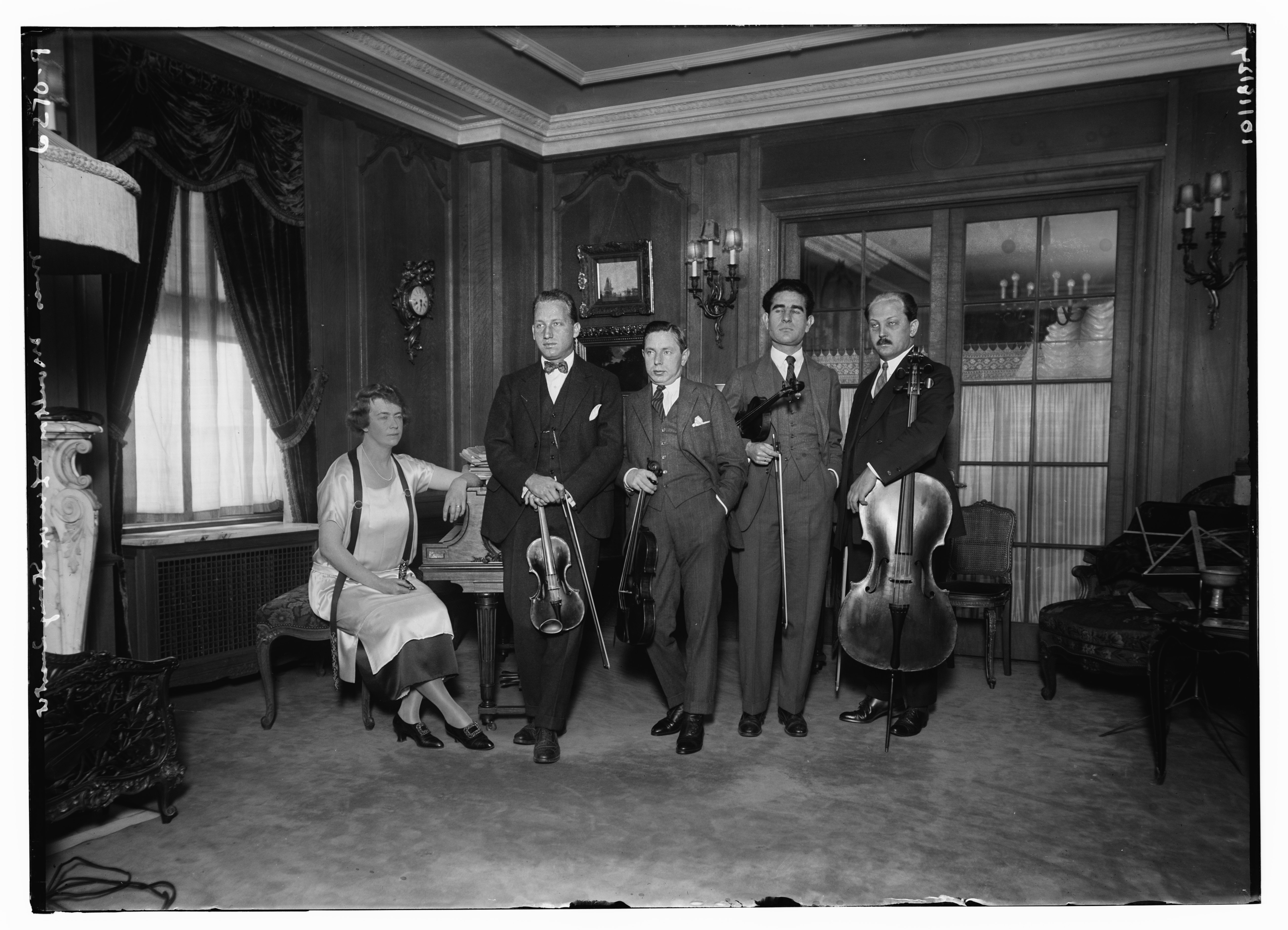
Harmati with soprano Dorothy Moulton Mayer (seated) and Nicholas Moldavan, Wolfe Wolfinsohn and Emmeran Stoeber of the Lenox String Quartet, 1924

He studied at the Budapest Music Academy in 1909, becoming a professor at age 17. From 1910 to 1912 he was Concertmaster of the Hungarian State Orchestra. He emigrated to the United States in 1914. From 1917 to 1921 he played with the Letz String Quartet, becoming leader in 1922; and the Elki Piano Trio (Ernö Rapée, piano; Paul Gruppe, cello; Sandor Harmati, violin). From 1922 to 1925 he played first violin with the Lenox String Quartet, which he co-founded.

In 1921 Sandor Harmati was a founding member of the American Music Guild, created by a group of young American composers "to learn each other's music and to present worthy works by other American composers to the New York public". The other charter members were Frederick Jacobi, Marion Bauer, Emerson Whithorne, Louis Gruenberg, Charles Haubiel, A. Walter Kramer, Harold Morris, Albert Stoessel and Deems Taylor.

On 11 November 1923, at the Klaw Theater in New York, Harold Bauer and the Lenox Quartet gave the first performance of Ernest Bloch's Piano Quintet No. 1, which was dedicated to the performers (Harold Bauer, piano; Sandor Harmati and Wolfe Wolfinsohn, violins; Nicolas Moldavan, viola; and Emmeran Stoeber, cello).

On 19 September 1924, at the 7th Berkshire Festival of Chamber Music, the Lenox Quartet took part in the first performance of La Belle Dame sans Merci, Wallingford Riegger's setting of John Keats' poem, for two sopranos, contralto, tenor, violin, viola, cello, double bass, oboe (English horn), clarinet and French horn.

From October 1925 until 1929, when he retired due to illness, Sandor Harmati was music director of the Omaha Symphony Orchestra. In 1927 he was invited to conduct several concerts at the International Festival in Frankfurt, Germany. He also had various guest conducting engagements in Paris and Berlin.

In 1933 he succeeded Albert Stoessel as conductor of the Westchester County Music Festival, and appeared with the Westchester Festival Orchestra in 1934 and 1935.

In February 1935, Sandor Harmati conducted the first United States performance of Gustav Holst's opera At the Boar's Head, at the MacDowell Club in New York.

On 1 March 1935, at New York's Adelphi Theatre, he conducted for the American Ballet's New York City premiere of George Balanchine's ballet Serenade (music from Tchaikovsky's Serenade for Strings arr. George Antheil).

On 5 March 1935, in New York, he again conducted the American Ballet at the world premiere of Balanchine's ballet Dreams (music by George Antheil).

Sandor Harmati died in Flemington, New Jersey on 4 April 1936, aged only 43.

== Bluebird of Happiness ==
Sandor Harmati is best remembered now for his song "Bluebird of Happiness", written in 1934 for his friend, the tenor Jan Peerce. The words were by Edward Heyman, with additional lyrics by Harry Parr-Davies. Peerce made three recordings of the song: in 1936, under the pseudonym Paul Robinson; in 1945, under his own name, with an orchestra conducted by Sylvan Levin; and in 1958 (the Las Vegas version) with Joe Reisman and his Orchestra. The 1945 recording became a worldwide hit for Peerce, outselling all his many operatic recordings, and becoming second only to Enrico Caruso's recording of George M. Cohan's "Over There" among the best-selling records made by opera and concert singers.

== Compositions ==
His other compositions included:

- an opera (Sweetmeat Game)
- two symphonic poems (Folio, Primavera; the first of which won a Pulitzer Scholarship in 1922)
- two Caprices (1914, 1932)
- Phantasy Variations
- Suite for String Orchestra
- Prelude to a Melodrama (this was first performed in 1928 by the Philadelphia Orchestra under Leopold Stokowski, and won a Juilliard Foundation Award)
- incidental music to The Jeweled Tree
- Elysian Idyll for flute and small orchestra
- three string quartets
- works for violin and orchestra, and violin and piano
- Indian Serenade (a cappella)
- Psalm 103 (mixed voices and orchestra)
- songs such as "God's World" (Edna St. Vincent Millay), "Nod" (Walter de la Mare), and "The Owl and the Pussycat" (Edward Lear).
- Illusion for Theremin and piano (written for Lucie Bigelow Rosen)
