= Pythian Building (Portland, Oregon) =

Historic building in Portland, Oregon, U.S.

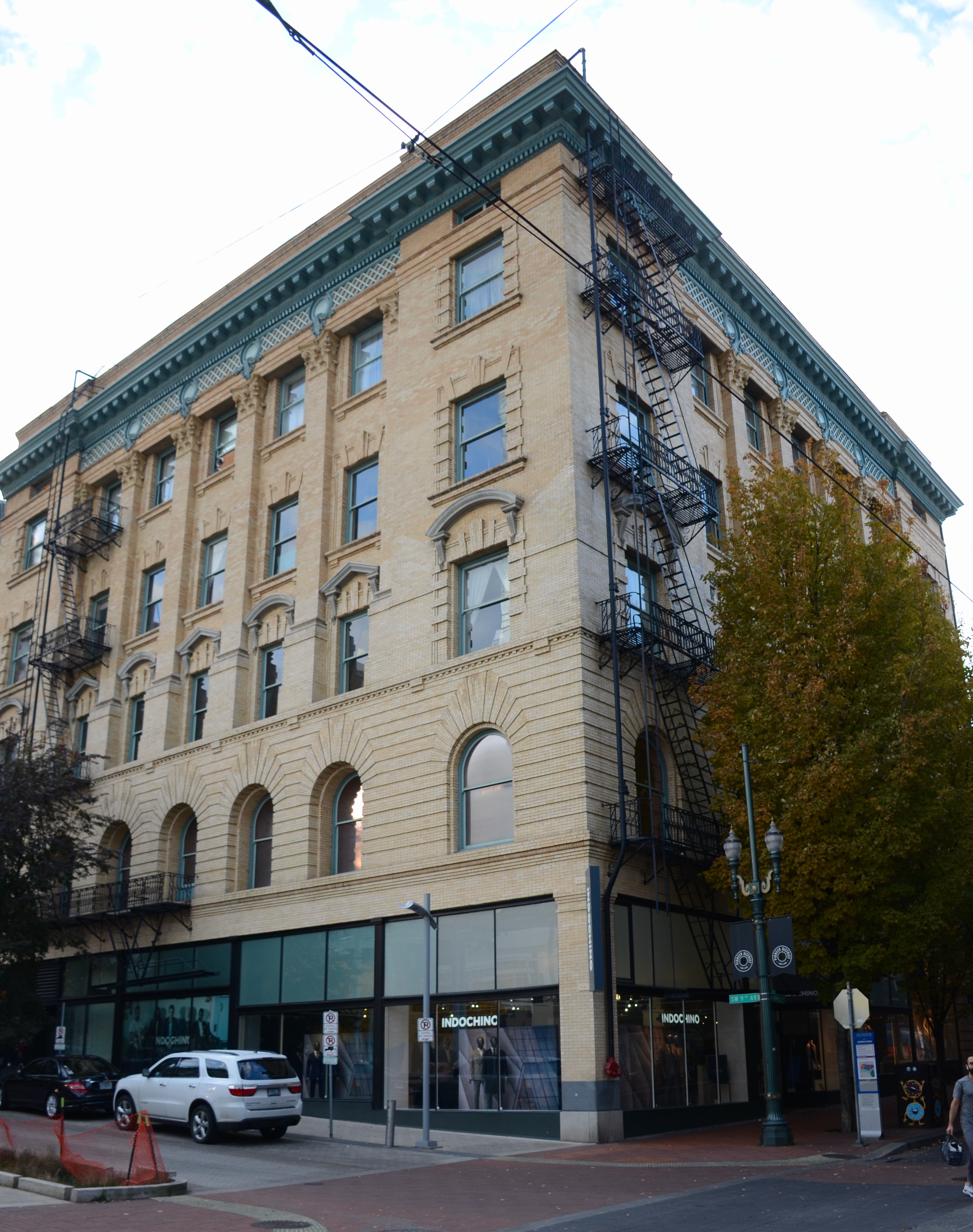
- The building's exterior in 2019
- Interactive map of the Pythian Building area

General information
- Location: Portland, Oregon, United States
- Coordinates: 45°31′8.5″N 122°40′54.8″W

The Pythian Building, completed in 1907, is a Masonic building in Portland, Oregon.
