= Sylvan Levin =

Sylvan Levin (1903 – 10 August 1996) was an American concert pianist and conductor. He served as the assistant conductor of the Philadelphia Orchestra and the New York City Symphony under Leopold Stokowski for many years. He also founded the Philadelphia Opera Company in 1938, serving as its director for six years.

== Biography ==
Born in Baltimore, Levin won a scholarship to study piano at the Peabody Institute at the young age of 12, studying there for several years. He continued with further piano and conducting studies at the Curtis Institute of Music in Philadelphia. While still a student, Levin began to work as a concert pianist. He appeared several times as a soloist with the Philadelphia Orchestra, notably playing the American premiere of Ravel's Piano Concerto in G with the orchestra in 1932 under the baton of Stokowski.

After graduating from Curtis he became highly active in Philadelphia's musical scene, notably becoming a principal conductor with the Philadelphia Grand Opera Company and becoming the assistant conductor of the Philadelphia Orchestra.

In the 1940s, Levin was musical director for the Mutual Broadcasting System on radio. Additionally, he was the conductor for Great Moments in Music on CBS. Programs for which he conducted the orchestra included Passport to Romance.

During the 1940s and 1950s, Levin served as music director for a number of Broadway musicals and musicals on tour in the United States. He notably led the U.S. State Department sponsored European and South American tours of George Gershwin's Porgy and Bess from 1954 to 1956. He also served as the music director for two Broadway productions, The Girl in Pink Tights (1954) and The Wayward Saint (1955). In 1957 he conducted the national road company performances of Lerner and Loewe's My Fair Lady.

After retiring from conducting, Levin joined the music faculty at the Curtis Institute of Music. He also taught as a voice teacher in Philadelphia throughout his career. Among his notable pupils was Natalie Bodanya. He died in 1996 at his home in Great Neck, New York at the age of 93.

He conducted Jan Peerce's 1945 best-selling recording of Sandor Harmati and Edward Heyman's song "Bluebird of Happiness", which outsold all Peerce's many operatic recordings, and became second only to Enrico Caruso's recording of George M. Cohan's "Over There" among the best-selling records made by opera and concert singers.
