= Arturo Toscanini discography =

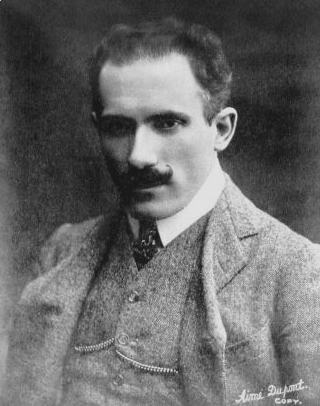
Arturo Toscanini

Arturo Toscanini was an Italian conductor, one of the most acclaimed musicians of the late 19th and 20th century. Toscanini was a prolific recording artist, having conducted many recordings from 1920 until his retirement in 1954.

== Toscanini and recording ==
Toscanini made his first recordings in December 1920 with the La Scala Orchestra in the Trinity Church studio of the Victor Talking Machine Company in Camden, New Jersey. He conducted his final recordings with the NBC Symphony Orchestra in June 1954 in Carnegie Hall. Toscanini's entire catalog of commercial recordings was issued by RCA Victor, with the exception of two recordings for Brunswick in 1926 (his first by the electrical process) with the New York Philharmonic Orchestra and a series of recordings with the BBC Symphony Orchestra from 1937 to 1939 for EMI's His Master's Voice label (RCA Victor's European affiliate). In 1929 and 1936, Toscanini and the New York Philharmonic made several recordings in Carnegie Hall for RCA Victor; he made a series of recordings with the Philadelphia Orchestra in 1941-42 in Philadelphia's Academy of Music which weren't issued by RCA Victor until the 1960s and '70s. All the commercially released RCA Victor and His Master's Voice recordings have been digitally remastered and reissued on compact disc. There are also recorded concerts with various European orchestras, especially with La Scala Orchestra and the Philharmonia Orchestra.

Toscanini's long standing disdain for recording was well-known; he especially disliked the acoustic method, and for several years recorded only sporadically as a result. He was fifty-three years old when he made his first recordings in 1920 and didn't begin regular recording until 1938, after he became conductor of the NBC Symphony Orchestra at the age of seventy. As the recording process improved, so did Toscanini's negative attitude towards making records and he eventually became more interested in preserving his performances for posterity. The majority of Toscanini's recordings were made with the NBC Symphony, which was created expressly for him. The NBCSO recordings, dating from 1937–1954, cover the bulk of his repertoire and document the final phase of his 68-year conducting career.

RCA began reissuing Toscanini's recordings on compact disc in the mid 1980s; From 1990-1992, Toscanini's entire recorded catalogue for RCA Victor was made available on compact disc, on the RCA Victor Gold Seal label. This 71-volume issue covered 82 CDs and was remastered, whenever possible, from original sources. Beginning in 1999, several of Toscanini's "high fidelity" recordings made between 1949 and 1954 were reissued in new remasterings. In 2012, Sony Masterworks, which now owns the RCA Victor archives, released an 84-CD boxed set of Toscanini's complete RCA Victor recordings and the commercially issued His Master's Voice recordings with the BBC Symphony on the RCA Red Seal label. In 2013, EMI Classics issued a 6-CD set containing Toscanini's complete His Master's Voice recordings with the BBC Symphony Orchestra. Recorded concerts with various European orchestras, especially with La Scala Orchestra and the Philharmonia Orchestra, have been issued on other labels. His retirement coincided with the first commercial stereophonic recordings. Only his final two NBC concerts, on March 21 and April 4, 1954, were recorded in stereo.

Toscanini's first recordings in 1920-21 were made at the exact midpoint of his conducting career (1886–1954), so they document Toscanini's conducting in the latter half of his career only.

=== Recording guides ===
A guide to Toscanini's recording career can be found in Mortimer H. Frank's "From the Pit to the Podium: Toscanini in America" in International Classical Record Collector (1998, 15 8-21) and Christopher Dyment's "Toscanini's European Inheritance" in International Classical Record Collector (1998, 15 22-8). Frank and Dyment also discuss Maestro Toscanini's performance history in the 50th anniversary issue of Classic Record Collector (2006, 47) Frank with 'Toscanini - Myth and Reality' (10-14) and Dyment 'A Whirlwind in London' (15-21) This issue also contains interviews with people who performed with Toscanini - Jon Tolansky 'Licia Albanese - Maestro and Me' (22-6) and 'A Mesmerising Beat: John Tolansky talks to some of those who worked with Arturo Toscanini, to discover some of the secrets of his hold over singers, orchestras and audiences.' (34-7). There is also a feature article on Toscanini's interpretation of Brahms's First Symphony - Norman C. Nelson, 'First Among Equals [...] Toscanini's interpretation of Brahms's First Symphony in the context of others' (28-33)

Mortimer Frank's Arturo Toscanini: The NBC Years (2002) contains an extensive, though now somewhat dated discography as 'Appendix 8'. In addition to all discs from the RCA Toscanini Collection (Gold Seal) and The Immortal Toscanini (Red Seal), many important broadcasts issued by Naxos, Music and Arts, Testament and others are also included. However, all releases after 2002 are not included, and there is a fair amount of these; for instance, the five disc boxed set with the complete Beethoven symphonies (RCA Red Seal). Also misleading is the listing of some old remasters on the Music and Arts label which are now available in better transfers; for instance, Tchaikovsky Manfred and Romeo and Juliet from March 21, 1953, have been re-issued in 2004 as CD-4260, whereas the book gives only the old edition from 1987 (CD-260).

== Albums ==
The discography below is not comprehensive, but rather representative. The listing only contains compact disc releases and does not contain 78 rpm, LP, cassette, or 8-track tape releases. In addition to recordings issued by the RCA label, it includes issues of rehearsals and broadcast performances on other labels.

Title/Program	Collaborators	Year(s) of Recording	Record label
Toscanini Collection, Volume 71: La Scala Acoustical Recordings: Beethoven: Adagio; Allegro molto e vivace (last movement) from Symphony No. 1 in C major, Op. 21; Allegro (last movement) from Symphony No. 5 in C minor, Op. 67; Berlioz: Rákóczy March; Bizet: L' Arlésienne, suite for orchestra No. 2; Carmen, Act 4: Entr'acte: Aragonaise; Donizetti: Don Pasquale Overture; Respighi: Ancient Airs and Dances, Set 1; Massenet: Scènes pittoresques; Mendelssohn: A Midsummer Night's Dream: Scherzo and Wedding March; Mozart: Menuetto and Finale from Symphony No. 39 in E flat major, K. 543; Pizzetti: La Pisanelle, Prelude to Act I; Wolf-Ferrari: Il segreto di Susanna, Overture	La Scala Theatre Orchestra	1920–1921	RCA Gold Seal
Toscanini Collection, Volume 64: Haydn - Beethoven: Haydn: Symphony No. 101 in D major "Clock"; Beethoven: Symphony No. 7 in A major, Op. 92; Mendelssohn: A Midsummer Night's Dream, Op.21: Scherzo	New York Philharmonic		RCA Gold Seal
Toscanini Collection, Volume 65: Mozart – Brahms – Wagner: Mozart: Symphony No. 35 in D major, K 385 "Haffner"; Mendelssohn: Midsummer Night's Dream, Op. 61: Scherzo and Nocturne; Brahms: Variations on a theme by Haydn, Op. 56a; Wagner: Siegfried Idyll; Dukas: The Sorcerer’s Apprentice	New York Philharmonic		RCA Gold Seal
Toscanini Collection, Volume 66: Overtures & Preludes: Gluck: Orfeo ed Euridice: Dance of the Blessed Spirits; Verdi: La traviata: Preludes to acts 1 and 3; Wagner: Götterdämmerung: Dawn and Siegfried's Rhine Journey; Lohengrin: Preludes to acts 1 and 3; Rossini: Il barbiere di Siviglia: Overture; L'italiana in Algeri: Overture; Semiramide: Overture	New York Philharmonic		RCA Gold Seal
Complete Philadelphia Orchestra Recordings (3-CD set): Schubert: Symphony No. 9 in C major, D 944 "Great”; Richard Strauss: Death and Transfiguration, Op. 24; Debussy: La mer; Images for Orchestra: No. 2, Ibéria; Respighi: Roman Festivals; Berlioz: Roméo and Juliet, Op. 17: Queen Mab Scherzo; Tchaikovsky: Symphony No. 6 in B minor, Op. 74 "Pathétique”; Mendelssohn: Midsummer Night's Dream: Excerpts*	Philadelphia Orchestra: Edwina Eustis, soprano*; Florence Kirk, soprano*; University of Pennsylvania Women's Glee Club*	1941–1942	RCA Red Seal
Beethoven: 9 Symphonies (5-CD set): Beethoven: Symphony No. 1 in C major, Op. 21; Symphony No. 2 in D major, Op. 36; Symphony No. 3 in E flat major, Op. 55 "Eroica"; Symphony No. 4 in B flat major, Op. 60; Symphony No. 5 in C minor, Op. 67; Symphony No. 6 in F major, Op. 68 "Pastoral"; Symphony No. 7 in A major, Op. 92; Symphony No. 8 in F major, Op. 93; Symphony No. 9 in D minor, Op. 125 "Choral"*	NBC Symphony Orchestra: Eileen Farrell, soprano*; Nan Merriman, mezzo-soprano*; Jan Peerce, tenor*; Norman Scott, bass*; Robert Shaw Chorale*	1949-53 (all broadcasts, except Nos. 1, 2, 8, and 9: studio)	RCA Red Seal 82876 55702 (the same remasters as in The Immortal, Vols. I-III, which also includes a 1953 studio recording of Missa Solemnis)
Italian Orchestral Music (2-CD set): Respighi: Pines of Rome; Fountains of Rome; Roman Festivals; Catalani: Loreley: Dance of the water nymphs; La Wally: Act 4 Prelude; Donizetti: Don Pasquale: Overture; Verdi: La forza del destino: Overture; Ponchielli; La Gioconda: Dance of the Hours; Rossini: L'italiana in Algeri: Overture; Semiramide: Overture; Guillaume Tell: Overture	NBC Symphony Orchestra	1949–1953 (all studio)	RCA Red Seal 74321 72374 (The Immortal, Vol. X)
Verdi & Cherubini: Choral Works (2-CD set): Verdi: Requiem*; Quattro pezzi sacri: Te Deum; Cherubini: Requiem in C minor	NBC Symphony Orchestra Robert Shaw Chorale: Herva Nelli, soprano*; Fedora Barbieri, mezzo-soprano*; Giuseppe Di Stefano, tenor*; Cesare Siepi, bass*	1951–1954 (broadcasts, plus many patches from rehearsals for Verdi's Requiem)	RCA Red Seal 74321 72373 (The Immortal, Vol. XI)
Schubert & Mendelssohn: Symphonies (2-CD set): Schubert: Symphony No. 5 in B-flat major, D 485; Symphony No. 8 in B minor, D 759 "Unfinished"; Symphony No. 9 in C major, D 944 "Great"; Mendelssohn: Symphony No. 4 in A major, Op. 90 "Italian"; Symphony No. 5 in D major, Op. 107 "Reformation"	NBC Symphony Orchestra	1950–1953 studio (Schubert)and broadcasts + rehearsals (Mendelssohn)	RCA Red Seal 74321 59480 (The Immortal, Vol. V)
Brahms: The Four Symphonies (2-CD set): Brahms: Symphony No. 1 in C minor, Op. 68; Symphony No. 2 in D major, Op. 73; Symphony No. 3 in F major, Op. 90; Symphony No. 4 in E minor, Op. 98	NBC Symphony Orchestra	1951-52 (studio)	RCA Red Seal 74321 55838 (The Immortal, Vol. IV)
Great Symphonies (2-CD set): Mozart: Symphony No. 40 in G minor, K. 550; Haydn: Symphony No. 94 in G major "Surprise"; Cherubini: Symphony in D major; Schumann: Symphony No. 3 in E flat major, Op. 97 "Rhenish"; Dvořák: Symphony No. 9 in E minor, B. 178/Op. 95 “From the New World"	NBC Symphony Orchestra	1949-53 (all studio, except Schumann which is a broadcast)	RCA Red Seal 74321 59481 (The Immortal, Vol. VI)
French Orchestral Music (2-CD set): Debussy: La Mer, L. 109; Ibéria, for orchestra, L. 122/2; Nuages, L. 91/1; Prelude to the Afternoon of a Faun, L. 86; Ravel: Daphnis et Chloé, suite No. 2; Berlioz: Roman Carnival Overture, H.95/Op. 9; Roméo and Juliet: Queen Mab Scherzo, H.79/Op. 17; Franck: Psyché; Herold: Overture to "Zampa"; Saint-Saëns: Danse macabre, Op. 40; Bizet: Carmen Suite No. 1; Thomas: Mignon Overture; Dukas: The Sorcerer’s Apprentice	NBC Symphony Orchestra		RCA Red Seal
Wagner (2-CD set): Wagner: Die Walküre: Ride of the Valkyries; Siegfried: Forest Murmurs; Die Götterdämmerung: Dawn and Siegfried's Rhine Journey / Siegfried's Death and Funeral Music; Siegfried Idyll; Tristan und Isolde: Prelude to Act I & Liebestod; Die Meistersinger von Nürnberg: Prelude to Act III; Parsifal: Prelude to Act I / Good Friday Spell; Lohengrin: Prelude to Act 1 / Prelude to Act III; Tannhäuser: Overture & Bacchanale	NBC Symphony Orchestra	1949-52 (all studio, except Tannhäuser which is a broadcast)	RCA Red Seal 74321 59482 (The Immortal, Vol. VII)
Orchestral Showpieces (2-CD set): Mussorgsky: Pictures at an Exhibition (orch. Ravel); Richard Strauss: Death and Transfiguration, Op. 24; Till Eulenspiegel's Merry Pranks, Op. 28; Brahms: Variations on a Theme of Haydn, Op. 56a; Four Hungarian Dances; Tchaikovsky: Nutcracker suite, Op. 71a; Sibelius: Finlandia, Op. 26; Smetana: Vltava (The Moldau)	NBC Symphony Orchestra		RCA Red Seal
Brahms & Tchaikovsky Piano Concertos: Brahms: Piano Concerto No. 2 in B-flat major, op. 83; Tchaikovsky: Piano Concerto No. 1 in B-flat minor, Op. 23	NBC Symphony Orchestra: Vladimir Horowitz, piano	1940–1941	RCA Red Seal
The Complete Concert of March 21, 1954: Rossini: Overture to Il barbiere di Siviglia; Tchaikovsky: Symphony No. 6 in B minor, Op. 74 “Pathétique”	NBC Symphony Orchestra	1954	Music & Arts
The Final Concert – April 4, 1954: Wagner: Lohengrin: Act I Prelude; Siegfried: Forest Murmors; Die Götterdämmerung: Dawn and Siegfried's Rhine Journey; Tannhäuser: Overture and Bacchanale; Die Meistersinger von Nürnberg: Act I Prelude	NBC Symphony Orchestra	1954	Music & Arts
Toscanini Collection, Vol 28 – Shostakovich, Prokofiev. Stravinsky: Prokofiev: Symphony No. 1 in D major, Op. 25 "Classical"; Shostakovich: Symphony no 1 in F minor, Op. 10; Glinka: Kamarinskaya; Liadov; Kikimora, Op. 63; Stravinsky: Suite from Petrouchka	NBC Symphony Orchestra	1940–1951	RCA Gold Seal
Toscanini Collection, Volume 38 - Gershwin, Grofé, Barber: Gershwin: An American in Paris; Grofé: Grand Canyon Suite; Barber: Adagio for Strings, (arr. From String Quartet, Op. 11); Sousa: El Capitan / The Stars and Stripes Forever (arr. Toscanini); Smith: The Star-spangled Banner (arr. Toscanini)	NBC Symphony Orchestra	1942–1945	RCA Gold Seal
Toscanini Collection, Volume 40 - Blue Danube Waltz, Etc.: Waldteufel: Les patineurs, Op. 183; Leopold Mozart: Cassation in G major "Toy Symphony"; Johann Strauss Jr.: Tritsch-Tratsch-Polka, Op. 214 / On the Beautiful, Blue Danube, Op. 314; Suppé: Poets and Peasants: Overture; Ponchielli; La Gioconda: Dance of the Hours; Paganini: Moto perpetuo, Op. 11 (arr. Toscanini); J. S. Bach: Suite for Orchestra No. 3 in D major, BWV 1068: Air; Glinka: Capriccio brillante on the theme "Jota aragonesa"; Weber: Invitation to the Dance, Op. 65	NBC Symphony Orchestra	1938–1952	RCA Gold Seal
Toscanini Collection, Volume 11 - Mozart Symphonies: Mozart: Symphony No. 39 in E flat major, K 543 / Symphony No. 40 in G minor, K 550 / Symphony No. 41 in C major, K 551 "Jupiter"	NBC Symphony Orchestra	1938–1948	RCA Gold Seal
Beethoven: Fidelio (2-CD set): Beethoven: Fidelio, Op. 72	NBC Symphony Orchestra: Eleanor Steber, soprano; Herbert Janssen, baritone; Rose Bampton, soprano; Jan Peerce, tenor; Sid Belarsky, bass; Joseph Laderoute, tenor; Nicola Moscona, bass; NBC Symphony Chorus	1944	RCA Gold Seal
Toscanini Collection, Volume 20 – Franck & Saint-Saëns Symphonies: Franck: Symphony in D minor, M 48; Saint-Saëns: Symphony No. 3 in C minor, Op. 78 "Organ"	NBC Symphony Orchestra		RCA Gold Seal
Toscanini Collection, Volume 35 – Elgar & Mussorgsky: Mussorgsky: Pictures at an Exhibition (orch. Ravel); Elgar: Variations on an Original Theme, Op. 36 "Enigma"	NBC Symphony Orchestra	1951–1953	RCA Gold Seal
Toscanini Collection, Volume 30 - Richard Strauss: Richard Strauss: Don Quixote, Op. 35* / Death and Transfiguration, Op. 24	NBC Symphony Orchestra: Frank Miller, cello*		RCA Gold Seal
Toscanini Collection, Volume 73 - Rossini & Mozart: Gioachino Rossini: Stabat Mater; Wolfgang Amadeus Mozart: Requiem in D Minor K.626 (completed by Franz Xaver Süssmayr)*	NBC Symphony Orchestra: Herva Nelli, soprano*; Jean Madeira, mezzo-soprano*; Jan Peerce, tenor*; George London, bass*; Lucine Amara, soprano; Rise Stevens, mezzo-soprano; Nicolai Gedda, tenor; Nicola Rossi-Lemeni, bass	1950-52	RCA Gold Seal
Toscanini Collection, Volume 60 - Verdi: La Traviata: Verdi: La Traviata	NBC Symphony Orchestra: Jan Peerce, tenor; Robert Merrill, baritone; Maxine Stellman, mezzo-soprano; John Garris, tenor; George Cehanovsky, baritone; Paul Dennis, bass; Arthur Newman, bass; Licia Albanese, soprano; Johanne Morland, soprano	1946	RCA Gold Seal
Haydn: Die Jahreszeiten (The Seasons) (Set 2-CD): Haydn: Die Jahreszeiten (The Seasons)	NBC Symphony Orchestra: Ljuba Welitsch, soprano; Jan Peerce, tenor; Nicola Moscona, bass	1951	RCA Gold Seal
Toscanini Collection, Volume 62 - Boito, Verdi: Opera Excerpts: Boito: Mefistofele: Prologue; Verdi; I lombardi: Qual voluttà trascorrere / Rigoletto: Act 3	NBC Symphony Orchestra: Nicola Moscona, bass/baritone; Vivian Della Chiesa, soprano; Jan Peerce, tenor; Zinka Milanov, soprano; Nan Merriman, alto; Leonard Warren, baritone	1954	RCA Gold Seal
Brahms: Piano Concerto No. 2 & Symphony No. 3: Brahms: Piano Concerto No. 2 in B-flat major, Op. 83* / Symphony No. 3 in F major, Op. 90	NBC Symphony Orchestra: Vladimir Horowitz, piano*	1946–1948	Music and Arts
Beethoven, Mozart, Cherubini (2-CD set): Beethoven: Missa solemnis in D major, Op. 123 / Symphony No. 7 in A major, Op. 92; Mozart: Symphony No. 35 in D major, K 385 "Haffner"; Cherubini: Anacréon: Overture	BBC Symphony Orchestra: Nicola Moscona, bass; Kerstin Thorborg, alto; Zinka Milanov, soprano; Koloman von Pataky, tenor; BBC Symphony Chorus	1935–1939	BBC
