= Florence Kirk =

American opera singer (1909–1990

- Born: 1909; Philadelphia, Pennsylvania, U.S.
- Died: June 6, 1999 (aged 90); Westminster, Maryland
- Education: University of Pennsylvania; Curtis Institute of Music
- Occupation: Operatic dramatic soprano
- Organizations: Metropolitan Opera

Florence Kirk (1909 – June 6, 1999) was an American dramatic soprano who had an active international performance career in operas and concerts from 1937 to 1954. Born in Philadelphia and trained at the Curtis Institute of Music by Elisabeth Schumann, she was particularly associated with the roles of Donna Anna in Mozart's Don Giovanni and the title heroine in Verdi's Aida. Her repertoire included other Verdi heroines like Leonora and Lady Macbeth, Santuzza from Mascagni's Cavalleria rusticana, Minnie in Puccini's La fanciulla del West and the title role in Tosca, and several roles from Richard Wagner's Ring Cycle.

Kirk sang leading roles with several American opera companies, including the Metropolitan Opera from 1943 to 1948. With the Met she recorded the role of Donna Anna in 1945. On the international stage, she appeared in opera houses in Argentina, Brazil, Canada, Greece, Mexico, and Turkey. She also appeared on the concert stage, notably recording Mendelssohn's A Midsummer Night's Dream with Arturo Toscanini and the Philadelphia Orchestra in 1942 for RCA Red Seal Records. Other prominent orchestras she performed with included the New York Philharmonic, the Minneapolis Symphony Orchestra, and the Cincinnati Symphony Orchestra. After retiring from full-time performance in 1954, she worked as a music teacher for the Carroll County Public Schools system in Maryland.

== Early life and education ==
Born in Philadelphia, Kirk was a descendant of Revolutionary War naval officer Stephen Decatur. Raised in Germantown, Philadelphia, she graduated from the University of Pennsylvania in 1931 with degrees in fine arts and music education. While a student at UPenn she was president of the Women's University Glee Club and held membership in the Chi Omega Beta Alpha Sorority and the Theta Alpha Phi honor society for theatre. She won a scholarship to the Curtis Institute of Music in 1936, where she studied voice with Ernst Lert, Emilio de Gogorza, and Elisabeth Schumann. She graduated from Curtis in 1939, shortly after placing second in the Metropolitan Opera Auditions of the Air.

== Opera and concert career ==
Kirk began her professional singing career while a student at Curtis. She made her opera debut in 1937 portraying the title role in Menotti's Amelia Goes to the Ball in Baltimore, followed by further appearances at the New Amsterdam Theatre in New York. She sang Amelia again with the Saint Louis Grand Opera in 1939 with Laszlo Halasz conducting. An important early success in her career was performing at the New York Philharmonic's 1937 Wagner Festival which was led by music director Fritz Reiner. She portrayed several roles in the Philharmonic's presentation of Wagner's Ring Cycle at the City College of New York's Lewisohn Stadium, including Freia and Woglinde in Das Rheingold (July 12); the Voice of the Forest Bird in Siegfried (July 20); and Wellgunde in Götterdämmerung.

Kirk was a member of the Philadelphia Civic Grand Opera Company in Philadelphia between 1937 and 1939 where she sang such roles as Ines in Il trovatore and the title role in Aida. In 1940 she was committed to the Chicago Opera Company where she made her debut as Micaela in Bizet's Carmen. During World War II she sang in "camp shows" with the United Service Organizations for the United States Armed Forces. In 1942 she was a member of the New Opera Company in New York City, performing as Verdi's Aida and Lady Macbeth at the Broadway Theatre. During her run as Lady Macbeth she had an infamous temperamental outburst in which she refused to perform over a dispute involving her costume. This led to opera star Regina Resnik's professional opera debut as Lady Macbeth, who music director Fritz Busch had lined up just in case Kirk became difficult.

Kirk went on to perform with several important American orchestras and opera companies during the 1940s, including concerts with the Minneapolis Symphony Orchestra and conductor Dimitri Mitropoulos; and the Cincinnati Symphony Orchestra with Eugene Aynsley Goossens. In 1942 she was the soprano soloist for the Philadelphia Orchestra's recording of Mendelssohn's A Midsummer Night's Dream with conductor Arturo Toscanini and contralto Edwina Eustis. She also sang under Toscanini's baton in several performances with the New York Philharmonic that year, including performances of Beethoven's Ninth Symphony and Missa solemnis with Hardesty Johnson, Alexander Kipnis, and the Westminster Choir at Carnegie Hall.

Kirk was committed to the Theatro Municipal in Rio de Janeiro and the Teatro Colón in Buenos Aires for the 1942–1943 season where she portrayed the roles of Amelia in Un ballo in maschera, Donna Anna, Leonora, and Maria in Verdi's Simon Boccanegra. In 1943 she performed as Donna Anna for her debut at the San Francisco Opera (SFO). She also portrayed Minnie in Puccini's La fanciulla del West at the SFO that year. She sang Donna Anna again with Thomas Beecham conducting at the Palacio de Bellas Artes in Mexico City in the summer of 1944. She also performed frequently as a leading soprano with the Charles L. Wagner Opera Company during the 1940s. In 1945 she portrayed Donna Anna at the Boston Opera House with conductor Bruno Walter leading the musical forces. Writing in The Boston Globe, music critic Cyrus Durgin stated:

In the role of Donna Anna the young dramatic soprano, Florence Kirk, made her Boston debut. Miss Kirk has a lovely voice, although it is not extraordinarily big. Her high tones gave her a little difficulty and tend to spread. The savage outcry, "Or sai chi l'onore", demands voice and more voice; Miss Kirk did quite well by it and made even better effect with Donna Anna's aria "Nom mi dir".

On November 29, 1944, Kirk made her debut at the Metropolitan Opera as Donna Anna with Ezio Pinza as Don Giovanni, Eleanor Steber as Donna Elvira, and George Szell conducting. She returned to the Met annually through 1948, enjoying particular success in the role of Aida. In 1945 she portrayed Santuzza in Pietro Mascagni's Cavalleria rusticana at the San Antonio Municipal Auditorium for the Symphony Society of San Antonio. In 1947 she replaced ailing Yugoslavian soprano Daniza Ilitsch as Aida mid performance at Houston's City Auditorium; singing acts 2, 3, and 4. She replaced Ilitsch as Aida again mid performance at the Metropolitan Opera House in 1948, after a case of laryngitis made it impossible for Ilitsch to sing the final act of the opera. Kirk happened to be attending the performance that evening, and a Met official who saw her in the audience rushed her backstage to apply makeup and get in costume in just ten minutes to finish out the opera. Speaking in a 1948 interview in The Baltimore Sun, Kirk stated: "As it was, I didn't have time to complete all of my leg makeup. And actually, I went on in two colors. But the last act is so dark, so I guess it was all right."

Kirk also sang Aida for the Lyric Opera Association in 1948 for performances at the Watergate Hotel in Washington, D.C., and the Lyric Opera House Baltimore. In 1946 she portrayed Leonora in Verdi's Il trovatore at the Rajah Theatre in Reading, Pennsylvania. Her first husband, the education administrator Elwood Kohl, was from the Reading area. She married a second time to Frederick Paul Keppel, a comptroller at the Metropolitan Opera, in 1948. She had one child with Keppel; a daughter named Lauren Keppel. From 1948 to 1954 she performed with opera houses outside of the United States. Notable among these international performances was a portrayal of Leonore in Beethoven's Fidelio at the Odeon of Herodes Atticus in 1949 and Santuzza at the Turkish State Opera in 1950. She also sang in operas with the Opera Guild of Montreal, including Leonora with Mack Harrell as the Count di Luna and Joseph Laderoute as Manrico in 1949. She portrayed the title role in Puccini's Tosca with the Greek National Opera in 1950. One of her final concerts was a recital of Greek music, both ancient and modern, given at Gettysburg College on April 25, 1958, in conjunction with a lecture series presented by classics scholar James A. Notopoulos at the Classical Association of the Atlantic States conference.

== Later life ==
In 1954 Kirk retired from the opera stage and moved with her second husband to a 109-acre (44 ha) farm in Taneytown, Maryland. In 1960 they sold the farm and moved to Westminster, Maryland. She lived there for the rest of her life, dedicating her time to her family, teaching singing, and performing in community musicals. She was a music teacher for Carroll County Public Schools from 1964 to 1972. Her second husband died in 1974. She married a third time in 1985 to Jerome Stern. She died of Alzheimer's disease at the age of 90.

== Recordings ==
Title	Conductor / Choir / Orchestra	Soloists	Label	Year
A Midsummer Night's Dream	Arturo Toscanini Philadelphia Orchestra, Women's Glee Club of the University of Pennsylvania	Florence Kirk; Edwina Eustis	RCA Red Seal Records	1942
Don Giovanni	George Szell Metropolitan Opera Chorus and Orchestra	Ezio Pinza; Salvatore Baccaloni; Florence Kirk; Charles Kullman; Eleanor Steber; Bidu Sayão	Golden Melodram	1944
