= Selma Amansky =

American singer and voice teacher (1909–1987)

Selma Amansky (5 January 1909 - 25 August 1987), also known by her married name Selma Caston or Selma Amanky-Caston, was an American soprano and voice teacher. She had a brief but prominent career in Philadelphia in the late 1930s and early 1940s; performing frequently with the Philadelphia Opera Company and the Philadelphia Orchestra. She was married to the conductor Saul Caston who was principal conductor of the Denver Symphony Orchestra from 1945-1964. After he left this post, the couple resided in Winston-Salem, North Carolina where Selma taught on the voice faculty of the University of North Carolina School of the Arts for thirteen years.

== Early life and education ==
The daughter of Maurice and Rosa Amansky, Selma Amasnky was born in Baltimore, Maryland on 5 January 1909. While she knew she wanted to be an opera singer from the time she was six years old, she began her training in Baltimore as a pianist where she studied with Max Landau and Virginia Castelle. She auditioned for the Curtis Institute of Music (CIM) in Philadelphia at the age of 16, and was selected among 215 applicants across a three day audition process. At the CIM she studied voice with soprano Harriet van Emden while an undergraduate student, graduating with a Bachelor of Music degree in 1934.

Amansky then pursued graduate studies in vocal music with Estelle Liebling as her voice teacher. Other teachers she studied under at the CIM included Ernst Lert, Richard Hageman, Alberto Bimboni, Karl Riedel, Wilhelm von Wymetal, Ernst Lett, Artur Rodziński and Fritz Reiner. While in grad school Amansky portrayed the role of The Wife the CIM's April 1937 production of Darius Milhaud Le pauvre matelot. On December 8, 1937 she sang a program with a chamber orchestra conducted by Louis Bailly on CBS Radio as part of a series of programs featuring students from Curtis. On April 5, 1938 she participated in a concert featuring Liebling' students at Casimir Hall; performing a program of music by Claude Debussy with the pianist Sylvan Levin. On May 4, 1939 she performed in a CIM concert of music by Rosario Scalero; performing his String Quartet with Voice, op. 31 (also known as "Rain in the Pine Woods) with the Curtis String Quartet.

== Performance career ==
Amansky began performing professionally while studying at Curtis. In January-February 1938 she was the soprano soloist in world premiere Harl McDonald's Symphony No. 3 for concerts with the Philadelphia Orchestra (PO) and conductor Eugene Ormandy at Constitution Hall in Washington D.C., Baltimore, and the Academy of Music in Philadelphia. She later repeated the work at the Hill Auditorium at the University of Michigan in May 1939; touring with the Philadelphia Orchestra to perform in Ann Arbor's 46th Annual May Festival. She appeared again with Ormandy and the PO in January 1940, performing Maurice Ravel's Shéhérazade. In July 1940 she performed with PO under conductor Georges Sébastian; singing arias from Die Fledermaus and Eugene Onegin, the folk song "Oh Dear! What Can the Matter Be?", and Harl McDonald's Daybreak.

In March 1938 she performed the role of Sieglinde in Die Walküre with the Philadelphia Civic Grand Opera Company. In August 1938 she performed a concert of arias by Richard Wagner with the Philadelphia Orchestra and conductor Alexander Smallens at the Robin Hood Dell West, including "Dich teure Halle" Tannhäuser, "Du bist der Lenz" and "Ho jo to ho" from Die Walküre, and "Liebestod" from Tristan und Isolde. In January 1940 she appeared with the Philadelphia Opera Company as Countess Almaviva in Mozart's The Marriage of Figaro with Leonard Treash in the title role, and portrayed Rosalinde in Die Fledermaus with the POC in April 1940 with Frances Greer as Adele. She returned to the POC in May 1940 in the title role of Georges Bizet's Carmen, and the following October performed with the POC in the role of Tatiana in Pyotr Ilyich Tchaikovsky's Eugene Onegin. She returned to the POC in 1941 as Giorgetta in Giacomo Puccini's Il tabarro Desdemona in the United States premiere of Emil von Reznicek's Spiel oder Ernst? (performed in English as Fact or Fiction?), and a reprisal of the role of Countess Almaviva.

== Marriage, teaching career, and later life ==
Amansky married the conductor and trumpeter Saul Caston on March 26, 1930. While known on the stage as Selma Amanksy, she was known off stage as Selma Caston or Selma Amanky-Caston. Her husband worked as assistant conductor of the Philadelphia Orchestra before becoming conductor of the Denver Symphony Orchestra (DSO) in Colorado. He served in that post from 1945-1964. After moving to Colorado Selma focused on raising the Caston's two children, Marise and Martin. In 1961 she was the soprano soloist in McDonald's Symphony No. 3 with the DSO.

After 1964, the Castons lived in Winston-Salem, North Carolina where Selma taught on the voice faculty at the University of North Carolina School of the Arts for thirteen years. By 1980 she was living in the Blumenthal Jewish Nursing Home in Greensboro, North Carolina. She died on 25 August 1987 in Forsyth, North Carolina.
