= Bruce Montgomery =

Bruce Montgomery may refer to:

- Bruce Montgomery (musical director) (1927–2008), composer, artist, conductor, and director from Philadelphia
- Bruce Montgomery (composer), also known as Edmund Crispin, English crime writer and composer
