= Richard Lert =

Austrian-American conductor (1885–1980)

- Born: 19 September 1885; Vienna, Austria-Hungary
- Died: 25 April 1980 (aged 94); Mountain View, California, U.S.
- Education: University of Vienna
- Occupation: Conductor
- Years active: 1910
- Employers: Opernhaus Düsseldorf; Staatstheater Darmstadt; Opern- und Schauspielhaus Frankfurt; Staatsoper Hannover; Mannheim National Theatre; Pasadena Symphony; Los Angeles Oratorio Society; University of Southern California
- Organization: Music Academy of the West
- Style: Classical music
- Spouse: Vicki Baum (m. 1916)
- Relatives: Ernst Lert (brother)
- Awards: Golden Baton

Richard Lert (19 September 1885 – 25 April 1980) was an Austrian-American conductor. Born in Vienna, he was the younger brother of the stage director Ernst Lert. After graduating with a music degree from the University of Vienna, he took a conducting post at the Opernhaus Düsseldorf in 1910. He left there in 1912 to take a similar position at the Staatstheater Darmstadt where he remained for four years. In 1916, he married the harpist Vicki Baum (who later became a well-known novelist) and that same year joined the conducting staff of the Opern- und Schauspielhaus Frankfurt.

From 1919 to 1923, Lert served as the music director of the Staatsoper Hannover and, from 1923 to 1928, was music director of the Mannheim National Theatre. He was thereafter active as a guest conductor with several opera companies and orchestras during the late 1920s and early 1930s. His base of operations during that period was Berlin and he appeared as a guest conductor frequently with the Berlin Philharmonic and the Staatsoper Unter den Linden.

From 1936 to 1972, Lert served as the music director and conductor of the Pasadena Symphony in Pasadena, California. He was also conductor of the Los Angeles Oratorio Society. In 1947, he co-founded the Music Academy of the West in Montecito, California, serving on the faculty there for many years. In 1964, he was awarded the Golden Baton award from the American Symphony Orchestra League. He died at the age of 94 in Mountain View, California. His papers are held in the collection at the library of the University of Southern California, where he was also a faculty member.
