= Los Angeles Oratorio Society =

Choir in Los Angeles, California

The Los Angeles Oratorio Society was a choir in Los Angeles, California that primarily performed oratorios. Founded in 1893 by conductor F. A. Bacon, the chorus was active in Los Angeles into the 1950s. The profile of the chorus was significantly raised during the tenure of conductor John Smallman who became conductor in 1912. He was succeeded by conductor Richard Lert. Under Lert's tenure the ensemble served as the official chorus of the Los Angeles Philharmonic in the late 1930s and 1940s.

== History ==
The Los Angeles Oratorio Society (LAOS) was founded in 1893. The choir was established by its first conductor, F. A. Bacon, who was a professor at the USC Thornton School of Music. The choir was largely made up of singers who had previously participated in two different Chautauquas, one organized by Charles E. Day and the other by Bacon. In 1899 the business side of the chorus was taken under the management of Lynden Behymer. By 1904 the chorus had come under the music leadership of conductor Julius Jahn with Behymer still as business manager.

John Smallman became the LAOS's conductor in 1912. On 30 April 1926 composer Percy Grainger conducted the LAOS in performances of Grainger's Fathers and Daughters and Marching Song of Democracy. On March 17, 1934, the chorus performed the world premiere of Scott Bradley's oratorio Thanatopsis based on the poem by William Cullen Bryant. The composer conducted the premiere performance which was given at the Philharmonic Auditorium.

During Otto Klemperer's first season as conductor of the Los Angeles Philharmonic (LAP), the LAOS performed Ludwig van Beethoven's Symphony No. 9 with the orchestra under his baton in 1934. After Richard Lert became the LAOS's conductor, the choir because the official chorus for the LAP concerts. In 1940 the LAOS and the LAP performed the world premiere of Elinor Remick Warren's oratorio The Passing of King Arthur under the baton of Albert Coates.

World War II interrupted the activities of the chorus, and the LAOS's performance activity, while not inactive, was significantly diminished during the war years. On October 14, 1941, the LAOS sang the world premiere of Igor Stravinsky's adaptation of The Star-Spangled Banner with the Works Progress Administration Symphony Orchestra under the baton of James Sample at the Hollywood Bowl. Anthony Collins was appointed conductor of the chorus in 1944. In 1945 the chorus sang Beethoven's Symphony No. 9 with the LAP under Leopold Stokowski.

After the war, Maurice Goldman was appointed associate conductor of the LAOS in 1947. In June of that year the chorus performed a benefit concert with Metropolitan Opera tenor Lauritz Melchior at the Hollywood Bowl. The concert raised funds for the United Jewish Welfare Fund which in turn aided survivors of The Holocaust. In 1950 the chorus recorded Heitor Villa-Lobos's Chôros No. 10 with conductor Werner Janssen and his Symphony Orchestra. The chorus was still active as late as 1954 when it participated in a musical fete held at the Saint Sophia Cathedral, Los Angeles which featured performances by five different choirs.

A later chorus, also known as the Los Angeles Oratorio Society, that was active in the 1960s and 1970s bares no relation to the earlier chorus. It was founded by Don R. Boyd, minister of Los Angeles First United Methodist Church. This chorus was active as late as November 1973 when it performed George Frideric Handel's Judas Maccabaeus.
