= Amelia Goes to the Ball =

Opera buffa by Gian Carlo Menotti

Amelia al ballo Amelia Goes to the Ball
- Opera buffa by Gian Carlo Menotti
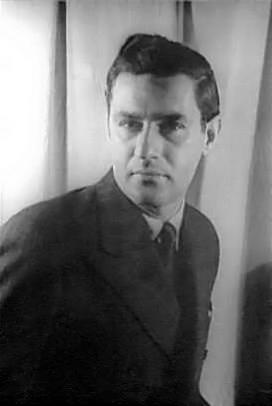
- The composer in 1944
- Librettist: Menotti
- Language: Italian
- Premiere: April 1, 1937 (in English); Curtis Institute of Music, Philadelphia

Amelia al ballo (Amelia Goes to the Ball) is a one-act opera buffa by Gian Carlo Menotti, who set his own Italian libretto. Composed during 1936 when Menotti was in his mid-twenties, it was the composer's first mature opera and first critical success. The opera recounts a series of farcical events as a young Italian socialite overcomes obstacles to her attendance at the first ball of the season.

== Performance history ==
Menotti secured a premiere for the work in Philadelphia. This required, however, a translation into English of the original libretto. George Mead prepared the translation and Menotti made minor revisions to the music to fit the new English words. Staged by the Curtis Institute of Music, Amelia Goes to the Ball premiered on April 1, 1937, at the Philadelphia Academy of Music under the direction of Austrian composer, librettist, and stage director Ernst Lert, with set and costume designs by Tony Award-winning designer Donald Oenslager.

The opera was presented in a double bill with the US premiere of Darius Milhaud's Le pauvre matelot. Both operas were conducted by Fritz Reiner. Sylvan Levin served as chorus master, and a young Boris Goldovsky worked as assistant conductor. The double bill played later that month in Baltimore at the Lyric Theatre and at the New Amsterdam Theatre in New York City, with Florence Kirk taking over the title role at the latter theater. On May 2, 1937, excerpts from the Menotti opera, performed by the original cast with Levin conducting, were broadcast by CBS Radio as part of National Music Week in the United States.

Still in its English guise, Amelia Goes to the Ball had its Metropolitan Opera premiere on March 3, 1938, with Muriel Dickson as Amelia, John Brownlee as her husband, and Mario Chamlee as her lover, under the baton of Ettore Panizza. The opera received a total of seven performances at the Met that season, four times in a double bill with Strauss' Elektra (including the opening night), twice paired with Strauss' Salome, and once with Rimsky-Korsakov's Le coq d'or.

The world premiere of the original Amelia al ballo took place, fittingly, in Italy: on April 4, 1938, in the opera house of the Sanremo Municipal Casino.

Amelia's success led to a commission from NBC for an opera specifically composed for radio: The Old Maid and the Thief of 1939. During the 1950s Amelia al ballo had a surge in popularity in Italy, with premiers at Teatro Comunale di Bologna (December 7, 1951), Teatro Regio in Parma (January 18, 1952), Teatro alla Scala in Milan (March 24, 1954), Teatro Regio in Turin (May 8, 1954), and Teatro dell'Opera di Roma (December 29, 1956), among others. The Spanish premiere was given at the Gran Teatre del Liceu on January 7, 1954, the Belgian premiere in La Monnaie on March 11, 1955, and the French premiere in Metz on December 9, 1967.

The opera had several revivals in 1987 when Menotti turned 75. Menotti himself directed a production in the original Italian at the Juilliard School Opera Center in New York and a special performance celebrating the 50th anniversary of the work's premiere at the Philadelphia Academy of Music by the Curtis Institute. The cast, drawn from Curtis, was handpicked by Menotti and included baritone Timothy Jon Sarris as Amelia's husband, Maria Fortuna as Amelia and tenor Perry Brisbane as her lover.

Amelia al ballo is still periodically performed, with productions in the 2008/2009 seasons in Vichy, Buenos Aires, and São Paulo, as well as a 2010 double bill with Menotti's The Telephone in Tours, using the 2006 co-production by Lausanne Opera and the Opéra Comique. The UK premiere will take place at the Guildhall School of Music in London on 2 November, 2026.

== Roles ==
Role	Voice type	Premiere cast, April 1, 1937 (Conductor: Fritz Reiner)
Amelia	soprano	Margaret Daum
Amelia's husband	baritone	Conrad Mayo
Amelia's lover	tenor	William Martin
Amelia's friend	contralto	Edwina Eustis
The chief of police	bass	Leonard Treash
The cook	mezzo-soprano	Wilburta Horn
The maid	mezzo-soprano	Charlotte Daniels
Chorus of nosy neighbours, passersby, police and ambulance men

== Synopsis ==
Place
An elegant apartment in Milan:

Amelia, a wealthy young socialite, is in her boudoir getting ready for the first ball of the season. However, her husband has discovered that she has a lover and refuses to accompany Amelia unless she reveals his name. When she reveals that her lover is their upstairs neighbor, a general melee breaks out between the jealous husband and her pesky lover, with Amelia eventually breaking a vase over her husband's head. When the police arrive, she tells them that a burglar had entered the apartment and attacked her husband with the vase. Her husband is taken to hospital, her lover is arrested as the burglar, and Amelia leaves for the ball on the arm of the chief of police who has come to investigate.

== Score ==
The full version of the score is orchestrated for three flutes, two oboes, two clarinets, two bassoons, two horns, three trumpets, three trombones, tuba, percussion, celeste, xylophone, harp and strings. The score was described by the Time magazine critic who attended the world premiere as "full of glowing, facetious music admirably suited to the story", and by the New York World-Telegram as "delightful", "vivacious" and "tuneful" in a review of its first performance at the Met. However, following a performance of Amelia Goes to the Ball in Birmingham, England, in 1989, Jan Smaczny writing for Opera described it as a "breath-takingly banal" combination of "blunt pastiche" and "overripe verismo lyricism".

== Recordings ==
- 1954: La Scala production of Amelia al ballo conducted by Nino Sanzogno with Margherita Carosio as Amelia, Giacinto Prandelli as her lover, and Rolando Panerai as her husband. CD: Testament Records (1999), Urania Records (2007) and Naxos Historical (coupled with a 1950 recording of The Consul) in 2010.
- Excerpts from the opera also appear on several CDs, most notably, Amelia's aria "While I waste these precious hours" on Leontyne Price – The Prima Donna Collection (RCA Victor Gold Seal, 1992/95) and the husband's recitative and aria "Non si va!...Amelia cara" on Prima Voce: Rolando Panerai (Nimbus Records, 2008).
