= Bruce Montgomery (musical director) =

American composer and artist

Bruce Montgomery

Bruce Eglinton Montgomery (June 20, 1927 – June 21, 2008) was an American composer, author, musical theater performer and painter; and a conductor and director, particularly of the Gilbert and Sullivan comic operas.

"Monty", as he was known around the Philadelphia performing community, was perhaps best known for his long tenure as director of musical activities at the University of Pennsylvania, as Artistic Director for the Gilbert & Sullivan Players of Philadelphia for 32 years, and as the director of the Gilbert & Sullivan Society of Chester County.

== Biography ==
=== Early years ===
Montgomery was born and grew up in Philadelphia, Pennsylvania, the son of James Montgomery, a professional operatic tenor of Scottish descent. His mother, Constance, was also musical. He had a brother, James, and two sisters, Elizabeth and Constance. He showed early enthusiasm for opera and appeared in the Philadelphia Orchestra Opera Company’s production of Gilbert and Sullivan's comic opera Trial by Jury at the age of five. He also wrote songs as early as age five. His parents took him out of school each Friday to hear the Philadelphia Orchestra at the Academy of Music. Montgomery graduated from Germantown Friends School in 1945, and he earned his bachelor's degree in painting and music composition in 1950 from Bethany College in Lindsborg, Kansas. For his senior project, he wrote and starred in a musical comedy.

=== Career ===
Montgomery began his career at the University of Pennsylvania in 1950 as an assistant director of the Cultural Olympics, a yearly event sponsored by the university that featured amateur performing artists. In 1951, he was drafted and sent to Korea to serve in the 45th Infantry Division of the United States Army during the Korean War. This experience inspired him to write Why Me? in 1967, a musical set in the Korean War, and Herodotus Fragments for symphony orchestra and two choruses, which the Philadelphia Orchestra first performed in 1970. While serving in the Korean War, Montgomery had occasion to entertain troops in Japan. In 1955, he served for a year as assistant to Penn's director of public relations. Montgomery was appointed director of musical activities at the University of Pennsylvania in 1956.

Also in 1956, Montgomery took over as director of the Penn Glee Club and served in that position for 44 years until his retirement in 2000, writing, directing, choreographing and conducting their shows, and bringing the glee club on tours to 30 countries on five continents. He published a memoir in 2005 entitled Brothers, Sing On!: My Half-Century Around The World With The Penn Glee Club through University of Pennsylvania Press, relating many of his favorite stories from his tenure and travels as director of the Glee Club, as well as reminiscences about his Gilbert and Sullivan activities. For the Glee Club, Montgomery composed the "Academic Festive Anthem", using words by Benjamin Franklin. His choral setting of Lincoln's Gettysburg Address was commissioned for the 100th anniversary of that speech in 1963. He also helped to create the Penn Singers as a light opera and musical theatre company in 1971 and continued to serve as their director until his death. In addition, he also served as director and/or music director of Mask and Wig, the University Band, and Penn Players. By 1980, he was head of 10 musical groups at the university, retiring from most of them in 2000. His only remaining official position at Penn as of 2008 was directing the Penn Singers' spring shows.

Montgomery's father founded the Philadelphia Gilbert & Sullivan Players in 1950, and Montgomery took over the group upon his father's death in 1955. He remained the group's Artistic Director for over three decades. Under his guidance, the group produced over 65 productions. He then served as stage director for the Gilbert & Sullivan Society of Chester County in West Chester, Pennsylvania from 1987 until 2007. He both directed and performed in each of the 14 Gilbert and Sullivan operas. Montgomery was also a composer and lyricist whose works have been performed by the Philadelphia Orchestra, the Chamber Orchestra of Philadelphia, and many other performing groups. He also provided occasional narration at Philadelphia Orchestra performances. The music he wrote for Gilbert and Sullivan's Thespis in the 1950s, for which Sullivan's original music is mostly lost, was produced successfully by him on several occasions, including at the International Gilbert and Sullivan Festival in 2000.

After his 1963 "Irish folk opera" Spindrift, was performed by the Penn Players, he wrote the music and lyrics for a 1964 off-Broadway show, The Amorous Flea with a book by Jerry Devine, based on Molière's L'École des femmes (The School for Wives) is still performed occasionally. In 1972, he wrote An Orpheus Triptych for the Orpheus Club of Philadelphia, a choral setting based on poems to Orpheus. Montgomery was also a frequent guest conductor for the Orpheus Club.

=== Last years and legacy ===
Montgomery's paintings and sculptures are included in various private collections and galleries. They have been exhibited at the Burrison Gallery in Philadelphia, among others. From 2000 until 2008, he sold his original notecards, featuring his watercolor artwork, through his company, Monty, Inc.

In 2005, Montgomery received an honorary doctorate from his alma mater, Bethany College. He was named Man of the Year by the Friars Club of Philadelphia in 2006. He also served on the boards of the Theodore H. Presser Foundation and the Edwin B. Garrigues Foundation. Montgomery's final public appearance was on May 10, 2008, at a dedication gala for the newly renamed Bruce Montgomery Theater in The Annenberg Center at The University of Pennsylvania featuring his compositions.

Montgomery, a resident of Chestnut Hill, Philadelphia, Pennsylvania, died of heart failure at his summer home on Spruce Head Island, Maine, the day after his 81st birthday. On October 5, 2008, a memorial service was held for Montgomery in the Irvine Auditorium on the University of Pennsylvania campus, where he conducted many concerts.

In 2010 Montgomery's family established the Bruce Montgomery Foundation for the Arts, a charity formed to provide scholarships and grants to fund projects in the performing arts consistent with Montgomery's artistic goals.
