= Pasadena Symphony and Pops =

Orchestra based in California, US

The Pasadena Symphony and POPS is an American orchestra based in Pasadena, California. In 2010, it took up residence at the Ambassador Auditorium, where its Classics Series runs from October through April. Since 2012, it performs a summer series at the Los Angeles County Arboretum and Botanic Garden from June through September.

== Brief history ==
The Pasadena Symphony was founded in 1928 as the Pasadena Civic Orchestra by Reginald Bland. From 1936 to 1972, Dr. Richard Lert served as music director and conductor. Virginia Gregg played double bass in the orchestra at this time before starring on the radio. The symphony was recognized with Metropolitan Status by the American Symphony Orchestra League in 1968. The organization became known as the Pasadena Symphony Association.

Daniel Lewis served as music director and conductor between 1972 and 1984.

In 1984, Jorge Mester became Pasadena Symphony's fourth music director.

In Fall 2007 the Pasadena Symphony incorporated the Pasadena POPS into its association under the new name Pasadena Symphony and POPS.

In 2007 Maestra Rachael Worby continued on from the previous Pasadena POPS Orchestra, assuming the principal POPS conductor position of the Pasadena Symphony Association. In August 2010 Maestro Marvin Hamlisch was appointed principal POPS conductor. After Hamlisch's death in August 2012, a search found Michael Feinstein, who assumed the post beginning with the 2013 POPS season.

== Venues ==
=== Ambassador Auditorium ===
In September 2010 the Pasadena Symphony became the resident professional symphony at Ambassador Auditorium.

At the time of its construction, the building was furnished with Iranian onyx, African teak, wool carpet from India, and gold overlay. It seats 1262. On January 26, 1996, National Public Radio staged a battle of the bands between the cities contending in Super Bowl XXX. Pittsburgh's River City Brass Band played Semper Fidelis by John Philip Sousa and the Battle Royal March by Fred Jewell in concert at Ambassador Auditorium, followed by a performance from Dallas at the Morton H. Meyerson Symphony Center.

The Worldwide Church of God (WCG), which operated the college and auditorium, ceased operation of both in the 1990s and sold the property. The WCG later relocated its operations to nearby Glendora.

On May 14, 2004, the church announced the sale of approximately 13 acres (53,000 m^{2}) of its former 31-acre (125,000 m^{2}) campus to Harvest Rock Church and Maranatha High School. The sale included the Ambassador Auditorium, now under the sole ownership of the church. In addition to hosting its own services and high school functions, it hosts public performances by many regional ensembles including the Colburn Orchestra, California Philharmonic and the Pasadena Symphony and POPS.

=== Los Angeles County Arboretum and Botanic Garden ===
In summer 2012, the Pasadena POPS performed at the Los Angeles County Arboretum and Botanic Garden, a 127-acre (51.4 ha) arboretum, botanical garden, and historical site in Arcadia.

=== All Saints Church ===
Beginning in 2011, the Pasadena Symphony has performed an annual Holiday Candlelight concert in Pasadena's All Saints Episcopal Church.

== Musical leadership ==
=== Reginald Bland ===
The Pasadena Symphony was founded in 1928 as the Pasadena Civic Orchestra by Conductor Reginald Bland. The original orchestra members were all volunteer musicians, most of whom were students of Maestro Bland. The annual operating budget was $3,500, all of which were funded by the City of Pasadena. The symphony presented its first concert on April 29, 1929.

=== Dr. Richard Lert ===
Dr. Richard Lert was appointed music director and conductor in 1936. Under Lert, the symphony became a founding member of the Los Angeles Symphony League in 1955, and was recognized with Metropolitan Status by the American Symphony Orchestra League in 1968. During his tenure, the organization became known as The Pasadena Symphony Association.

=== Daniel Lewis ===
Under his leadership, several national awards were won, including five American Society of Composers, Authors and Publishers (ASCAP) awards for adventuresome programming. Lewis's tenure also marks the founding of the symphony's longest-running education program, the Pasadena Youth Symphony Orchestra.

=== Jorge Mester ===
In 1984, conductor Jorge Mester was selected as the Pasadena Symphony's fourth music director.

=== Marvin Hamlisch ===
In August 2010, American composer Marvin Hamlisch was appointed Principal POPS Conductor for the organization.

=== Michael Feinstein ===
After Hamlisch's death in August 2012, a search found Great American Songbook star Michael Feinstein, who assumed the post beginning with the 2013 POPS season.

=== James DePreist ===
In June 2010, American conductor James DePreist was named artistic advisor to the Pasadena Symphony and POPS.

=== David Lockington ===
Maestro Lockington began his tenure as music director during the 2013–14 season with full duties which commenced in 2014–15 with multiple performances.

=== Nicholas McGegan ===
Since 2013, British conductor, Nicholas McGegan is the current conductor of the Pasadena Symphony Orchestra.

== Pasadena Youth Symphony Orchestra ==
The Pasadena Symphony Association also operates the Pasadena Youth Symphony Orchestra (PYSO). It consists of four separate ensembles: a wind ensemble, string ensemble, the symphony orchestra and the philharmonic. The ensembles operate under the direction of Pasadena Symphony staff. PYSO has several levels of ensembles, including the philharmonic conducted by Chris Kim, the sinfonia orchestra conducted by Pin Chen, the symphony orchestra conducted by Jack Taylor, and the wind ensemble conducted by Gary Yearick.
