= The Amorous Flea =

- Music: Bruce Montgomery
- Lyrics: Bruce Montgomery
- Book: Jerry Devine
- Basis: Molière's 1662 comedy The School for Wives
- Productions: 1964 Off-Broadway

The Amorous Flea is a musical with a book by Jerry Devine and music and lyrics by Bruce Montgomery. It is based on Molière's 1662 comedy The School for Wives.

The off-Broadway production, directed by Jack Sydow, opened on February 17, 1964, at the East 78th Street Playhouse and moved to York Theatre, running for a total of 93 performances. Proctor won the Theatre World Award for his performance. Songs in the production include "Lessons On Life".

== Principal cast ==
- Arnolphe - Lew Parker - Baritone
- Chrysalde - David C. Jones - Baritone
- Alain - Jack Fletcher - Baritone
- Georgette - Ann Mitchell - Alto
- Agnes - Imelda De Martin - Mezzo-soprano
- Horace - Philip Proctor - Tenor

== Synopsis ==
Arnolphe is about to marry Agnes, a beautiful orphaned girl whom he has groomed to be the perfect wife by sequestering her in a convent and keeping her totally ignorant of the outside world since she was four years old. Just as she reaches legal age, she meets and falls in love with Horace (son of Arnolphe's old friend Oronte), whom Arnolphe befriends without revealing his identity as the girl's lecherous fiancé. To his dismay, Horace persists in describing his success at wooing Agnes. Eventually her birth father Enrique arrives on the scene to demand she fulfill the marriage contract he arranged for her many years before, Agnes discovers the deception, and the revelation of the identity of the intended groom leaves Arnolphe a very unhappy man.

== Songs ==
=== Act I ===
- All About Me
- All About He
- All About Him
- Learning Love
- There Goes a Mad Old Man
- Dialogue on Dalliance

=== Act II ===
- March of the Vigilant Vassals
- Lessons on Life
- Man is Man's Best Friend
- The Other Side of the Wall
- Closeness Begets Closeness

=== Act III ===
- It's a Stretchy Day
- When Time Takes Your Hand
- The Amorous Flea
- Learning Love (Reprise)
- Finale
