= Harl McDonald =

American composer (1899–1955)

Harl McDonald (July 27, 1899 – March 30, 1955) was an American composer, conductor, pianist and teacher. McDonald was born in Boulder, Colorado, and studied at the University of California, Berkeley, the University of Redlands, and the Leipzig Conservatory. He was appointed a lecturer at the University of Pennsylvania in 1927 and enjoyed other appointments at the University including the Director of the Music Department and Director of the University's Choral Society and the University of Pennsylvania Glee Club. Among his students there was Ann Wyeth McCoy. In addition to his administrative duties with the University, McDonald composed numerous musical works and served on the board of directors of the Philadelphia Orchestra Association. He died in Princeton, New Jersey due to a stroke at the age of 55 while helping to direct the production of a motion picture film on orchestral music.

His four symphonies are subtitled "The Santa Fe Trail" (#1 - 1933), "The Rhumba" (#2 - 1934), "Lamentations of Fu Hsuan" (#3 - 1935) and "Festival of the Workers" (#4 - 1937). His symphony no. 3 was given its premiere performance by the Philadelphia Orchestra, the chorus of the University of Pennsylvania, and soprano Selma Amansky under conductor Eugene Ormandy in 1938. Performances were given at Constitution Hall in Washington D.C., Baltimore, and the Academy of Music in Philadelphia. His other works include a concerto for two pianos, two piano trios, and choral music. His 1938 Lament for the Stolen, for women's chorus and orchestra, was written in commemoration of the Lindbergh kidnapping.
