= Leonard Treash =

American opera singer

- Born: January 1, 1909
- Died: January 31, 1996 (aged 87); Rochester, New York
- Education: Curtis Institute of Music
- Occupations: Bass singer; Opera director; Educator
- Years active: 1933-1976

Leonard Treash (January 1, 1909 in Pennsylvania – January 31, 1996 in Rochester, New York) was an American bass, opera director, and educator. As a performer he sang leading opera roles throughout the United States under such conductors as Fritz Reiner, Leopold Stokowski, Artur Rodzinski, and Erich Leinsdorf. He was particularly active as a performer with opera companies in Philadelphia, and is especially remembered as the long time director of the opera program at the Eastman School of Music, a post he held for nearly 30 years. He also served as General Director of Chautauqua Opera for 10 seasons and was the first President of the National Opera Association from 1955-1956.

== Life and career ==
Born and raised in Pennsylvania, Treash was the son of Harvey Beaumont Treash and Bernice Pugsly. He studied singing at the Cincinnati College-Conservatory of Music and at the Curtis Institute of Music in Philadelphia. While a student he made his first professional opera performance on the radio in 1933 singing Titurel in Richard Wagner's Parsifal with the Philadelphia Orchestra under conductor Leopold Stokowski. He appeared frequently with that orchestra in concerts during the 1930s and 1940s, including portraying the role of Patrocle in the United States premiere of Christoph Willibald Gluck's Iphigénie en Aulide on February 22, 1935 at the Academy of Music. At that same opera house he notably created the role of The Chief of Police in the world premiere of Gian Carlo Menotti's Amelia Goes to the Ball and portrayed the Father-In-Law in the United States premiere of Darius Milhaud's Le pauvre matelot which were performed in a double bill on 1 April 1937. He was the winner of the National Federation of Music Clubs Award for most promising young American singer in 1935.

During the late 1930s and early 1940s, Treash was highly active as a performer with the Philadelphia Civic Grand Opera Company and the Philadelphia Opera Company. Among the many roles he performed at the Academy of Music in Philadelphia were Colline in La bohème, Don Alfonso in Così fan tutte, Figaro in The Marriage of Figaro, Fiorello in The Barber of Seville, Frank in Die Fledermaus, Hans Foltz in Die Meistersinger von Nürnberg, Hunding in Die Walküre, Méphistophélès in Faust, the Notary in Der Rosenkavalier, Simone in Gianni Schicchi, Spalanzani and Crespel in The Tales of Hoffmann, and Zuniga in Carmen among others. In 1942 he created the role of the Vicar of Etchezar in the world premiere of Deems Taylor's Ramuntcho with Sylvan Levin's Philadelphia Opera Company.

Outside of Philadelphia, Treash also worked as a guest artist with important orchestras like the Cleveland Orchestra and sang with regional American opera companies like the Cincinnati Opera. He notably portrayed Swallow in the historic American premiere of Benjamin Britten's Peter Grimes at the Tanglewood Music Festival under conductor Leonard Bernstein in 1946.

In 1943 Treash was appointed chair of the vocal music program at Baldwin Wallace University where he notably founded the school's opera theatre program. He remained in that post until 1947 when he was appointed head of the opera department at the Eastman School of Music; a position he held until his retirement in 1976. While at Eastman, he concurrently served as General Director of the Chautauqua Opera from 1966 through 1975. In 1953 he founded Opera Under the Stars, a company which produced operas in Rochester during the summer months at Highland Bowl in the city's Highland Park until 1976. He also directed operas for numerous American opera companies during his career, including the Hawaii Opera Theatre.
