= University of Pennsylvania Glee Club =

Student glee club founded in 1862

The University of Pennsylvania Glee Club
- Choir
- Also known as: Penn Glee Club
- Origin: Philadelphia, PA, USA
- Founded: November 5, 1862 (164 years ago)
- Notable members: Marc Platt; Bruce Montgomery
- Music director: Sam Scheibe
- Associated groups: The Penn Pipers; The Penn Glee Club Band; Penn Sirens
- Website: penngleeclub.com

Founded in 1862, the University of Pennsylvania Glee Club (Penn Glee Club) is one of the oldest continually running glee clubs in the United States and the oldest performing arts group at the University of Pennsylvania. The Club draws its singing members from the undergraduate and graduate populations of the University of Pennsylvania; individuals from the Penn community are also called upon to fill roles in the band and technical staff when the Club puts on theatrical productions. The club, known for its eclectic mix of Penn standards, Broadway classics, classical favorites, and pop hits, has traveled to over 40 countries and territories on five continents. On April 9, 2021, the Penn Glee Club began accepting singers of all genders. The Glee Club's current music director is Sam Scheibe.

== History ==
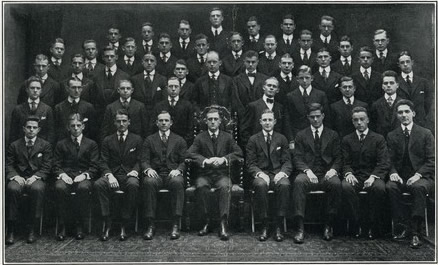
The 1915-1916 Penn Glee Club

The Glee Club's history began modestly in 1862 when eight undergraduate men formed what is now the oldest performing arts group at the University of Pennsylvania; subsequently, another eight men were added to the group. The Glee Club's premiere performance was in the chapel of Collegiate Hall at Ninth & Chestnut Streets in Philadelphia for "an audience that was unusually select and large, the Hall filled to its utmost capacity". At this concert, each man wore red and blue ribbons in his buttonhole, thus becoming the first known Penn group to wear the university colors as part of its uniform.

The Glee Club quickly became a part of campus life, singing at football rallies, basketball games, alumni events, and chapel services. Soon, much of the university's musical demands depended upon the Glee Club. As a result, the reliance on such traditional collegiate songs such as Gaudeamus Igitur and Integer Vitae gave way to original pieces composed especially for the university and the Glee Club which themselves became traditions: "The Red and Blue," "Afterglow," and "Fight On, Pennsylvania."

The Glee Club began to have more of a regional and national presence in the early decades of the Twentieth Century. In 1910, it embarked on a brief tour of the New England states. In 1915, the club sang at the U.S. Naval Academy. In 1926, the Glee Club performed for President Calvin Coolidge in the White House. In 1928, listeners could hear the club as far west as Nebraska in a broadcast publicizing the newly formed CBS Radio Network.

In 1934, under director Harl McDonald, the Penn Glee Club began performing with the Philadelphia Orchestra. The club's partnership with this symphony came to include a 1938 performance of the Brahms' Alto Rhapsody with Marian Anderson and the 1970 world premiere broadcast of then-Director Bruce "Monty" Montgomery's Herodotus Fragments. The 1950s saw the first of many Glee Club appearances on national television with such celebrities as Ed McMahon and Carol Lawrence. The club has been showcased on television specials, in the Macy's Thanksgiving Day Parade, and at professional sporting events. The Philadelphia Phillies had the Club sing the National Anthem at the 1993 National League Championship Series. In 1976, the Penn Glee Club first performed with the Boston Pops. The club has also shared the stage with such superstars as Bob Hope, Frank Sinatra, Jimmy Stewart, and Grace Kelly.

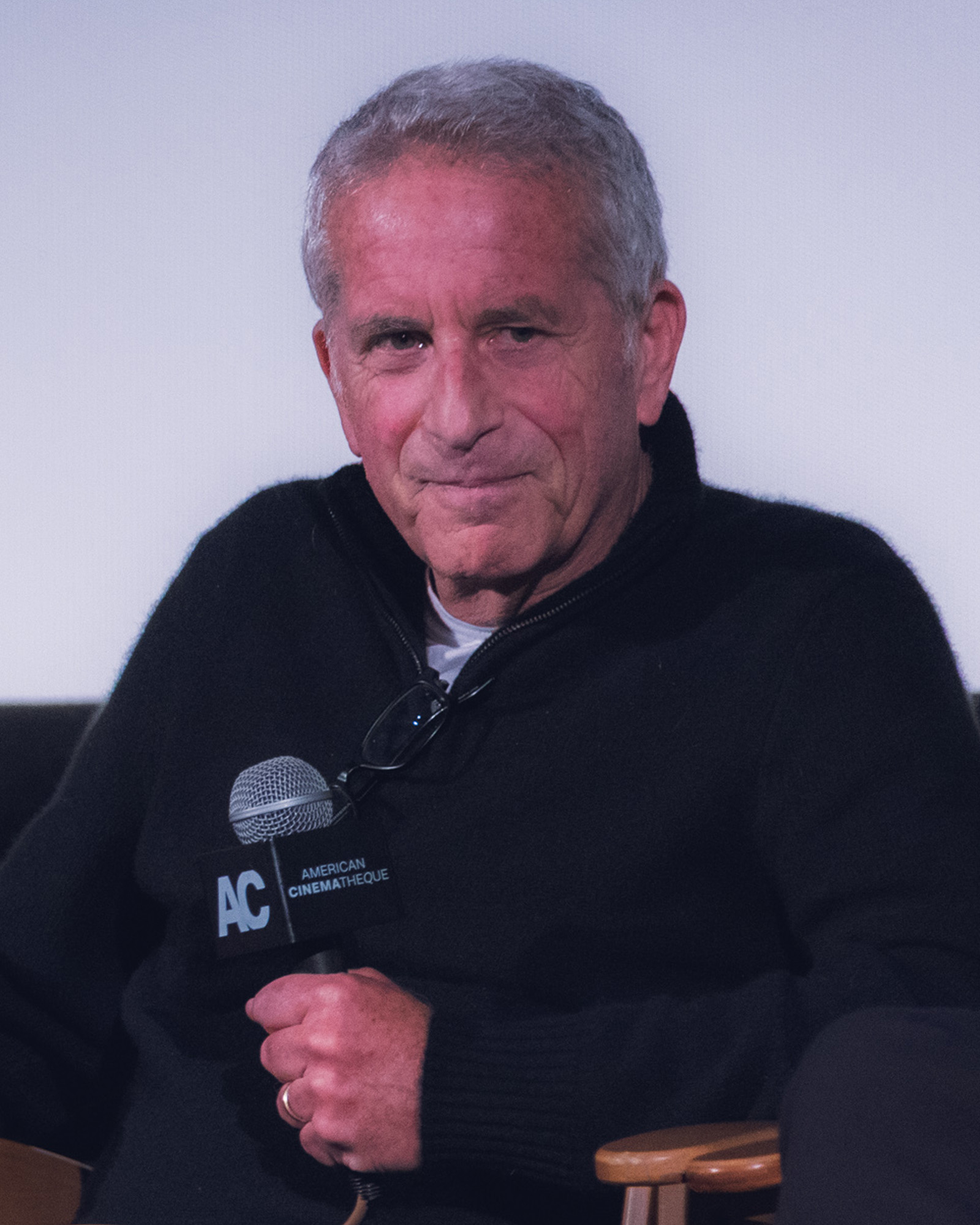
Former Glee Club member Marc Platt

The Penn Glee Club stepped out of the formal lines of choral performance in 1928, performing its first fully staged production, Hades, Inc., written by then-director H. Alexander Matthews. Staging became standard fare for the modern Club with 1969/1970's Handel With Hair. Each year, the Club writes and produces a fully staged, Broadway-style production, highlighting choral singing, clever plots and dialogue, dancing, humor, colorful sets and costumes, and a pit band.

The Penn Glee Club has toured internationally since 1959 and has traveled to nearly all 50 states in the United States and 37 nations and territories on five continents. Since its first performance at the White House for President Calvin Coolidge in 1926, the club has sung for numerous heads of state and world leaders, including for Polish President Lech Wałęsa in 1989. In 1999, several prominent Japanese executives sponsored a tour to Guam and Japan, the club's first tour of the Asian Pacific. In 2004, the Club returned to Asia, this time touring China, Hong Kong, Taiwan and Singapore. The following year, in 2005, the Club journeyed back to South America for the first time since 1987, touring Argentina and Uruguay. The 2006–2007 season saw the group traveling to Ireland and Northern Ireland for the first time. In the summer of 2009, the Club toured Colombia, Panama, and Costa Rica.

In 2021, the Penn Glee Club expanded its singing section to a full soprano, alto, tenor, bass (SATB) roster by combining with its sister group, the Penn Sirens. The club now features an SATB choir, SSAA and TTBB chamber choirs, and two student-run a cappella groups, the Penn Pipers and Penn Sirens.

== Directors ==
- Sam Scheibe, 2024–Present
- Daniel Carsello, 2018–2024
- Joshua Glassman, 2015–2018
- C. Erik Nordgren, 2000–2015
- Bruce Montgomery, 1956–2000
- Robert Godsall, early 1950s
- Harl McDonald, 1940s.
- Burton True Scales, 1930s
- H. Alexander Matthews, 1920s
- Frederick Brooke Neilson, 1890–92
- Joseph Spencer Brock, mid-1880s
- Hugh Alexander Clarke, c. 1880–mid-1880s
- Robert Neilson, c. 1869–c. 1871
- Francis Ashhurst, c. 1865–c.1868
- T.B. Bishop, c. 1862–c.1864

== International tours ==
For over five decades, the University of Pennsylvania Glee Club has toured in over 45 countries and territories on 5 continents. The following is a complete list of the countries to which the Glee Club has traveled:

- 1959: Puerto Rico
- 1968: Canada
- 1969: Ecuador, Peru, Panama
- 1971: Belgium, Bulgaria, Denmark, England, Finland, Netherlands, Soviet Union, Yugoslavia
- 1983: West Germany, Denmark
- 1984: Puerto Rico
- 1985: Greece
- 1986: England, Scotland
- 1987: Jamaica, Peru
- 1989: Mexico
- 1990: Austria, Belgium, Czechoslovakia, Hungary
- 1992: Israel
- 1995: Austria, Czech Republic, Slovakia
- 1997: Spain, Gibraltar, Morocco
- 1999: Guam, Japan
- 2001: Mexico
- 2002: Canada
- 2004: China, Hong Kong, Singapore, Taiwan
- 2005: Argentina, Uruguay
- 2007: Ireland, Northern Ireland
- 2009: Colombia, Panama, Costa Rica
- 2011: Sweden, Norway, Iceland
- 2012: Bermuda, Canada
- 2014: Qatar, Tanzania, United Arab Emirates
- 2015: Austria, Czech Republic, Germany
- 2017: Singapore, Thailand
- 2018: Canada
- 2019: China, Hong Kong, Macau, Taiwan, Japan
- 2022: Spain, Monaco, France
- 2023: Chile, Panama
- 2024: Italy
- 2025: Japan, Hong Kong, China
- 2026: Peru

== Award of Merit recipients ==
Established in 1964 "to bring a declaration of appreciation to an individual each year that has made a significant contribution to the world of music and helped to create a climate in which our talents may find valid expression."

- Randall Thompson – May 2, 1964
- Robert Shaw – February 26, 1965
- Marshall Bartholomew – February 26, 1967
- William L. Dawson – February 25, 1968
- Leopold Stokowski – February 24, 1969
- Elaine Brown – February 24, 1969
- Gaylord P. Harnwell – May 15, 1970
- Aaron Copland – December 5, 1970
- Sol Hurok – December 4, 1971
- Eugene Ormandy – December 15, 1972
- Marian Anderson – October 20, 1973
- Samuel Barber – October 19, 1974
- Burl Ives – October 25, 1975
- Arthur Fiedler – October 23, 1976
- Risë Stevens – October 22, 1977
- Leonard De Paur – October 28, 1978
- Paul Hume – October 20, 1979
- Robert Merrill – February 16, 1981
- Bruce Montgomery – February 21, 1981
- Vincent Persichetti – May 19, 1984
- Sheldon Harnick – May 16, 1992

== Honorary members ==
Over the years, certain individuals have shown particular devotion to and support of the Glee Club well beyond the norm. When such exceptional fealty is repeatedly demonstrated, the Club occasionally recognizes such support with honorary membership.

- 1968 – E. Brooks Lilly
- 1968 – Charles H. Cox III
- 1969 – Santiago Friele
- 1976 – Edward F. Lane
- 1978 – Stepen Goff
- 1983 – Michael T. Huber
- 1987 – William Kelley
- 1987 – Steven Aurand
- 1990 – Nicholas Constan
- 1990 – E. Craig Sweeten
- 1990 – Claude White
- 1991 – Ray Evans
- 1991 – Jay Livingston
- 1995 – Rev. Stanley Johnson
- 1995 – Timothy J. Alston
- 2004 – Paul Liou
- 2012 – Elizabeth Thomas and Nick Thomas
- 2023 – The Rev. Charles (Chaz) Lattimore Howard, Laurie McCall

== The Penn Pipers ==
The Penn Pipers, a subset of the Glee Club, formed in 1950, making it the oldest existing a cappella group at the University of Pennsylvania. Its founding student leaders created arrangements emulating the close, contemporary harmonies of a popular, jazz-oriented quartet called The Hi-Los. The Pipers' most popular tune of the time—a lush setting of Brahm's Lullaby arranged by member Bill Tost—became its standard closing number for many years. The group has always been a subset of the University of Pennsylvania Glee Club and serves as an opportunity for some of the Glee Club's singers to perform music of a lighter and more popular style.

The group performs barbershop music and doo-wop. Its current repertoire encompasses popular music from the 1890s through to the present day.

== The Penn Glee Club Band ==
The Penn Glee Club Band is the Glee Club's pit band. As its own ensemble, the band performs on its own as well. The band was formed in 2012 as an integral part of the larger Club's annual fall and spring shows. In addition to performing in the fall and spring shows, the Penn Glee Club Band also performs its own gigs, both on campus and around the city.
