= Orpheus Club of Philadelphia =

The Orpheus Club is a men's singing club based in Philadelphia, the largest city in the state of Pennsylvania, United States, and is the oldest of its kind in the United States. It was founded on December 7, 1872, when twenty-two members performed at the Musical Fund Hall on Locust Street in Philadelphia.

The club was first led by the American conductor Michael Hurley Cross (1833–1897), who was one of its original founders. Well over a century later, in 2012, the conductors of the group are John Shankweiler (Conductor) and Clyde R. Dengler, Jr. (Conductor Emeritus). The Orpheus club performs its Christmas, winter and spring concerts at the Academy of Music in Philadelphia and at the Kimmel Center. Its Twelfth Night Revels performance is held at the Orpheus clubhouse on South Van Pelt Street each January.

== History ==
=== 19th century ===
The Orpheus Club of Philadelphia gave its first performance at the Musical Fund Hall in 1872. Its founders, including the conductor Michael Hurley Cross, had broken away from the old Abt Society in the summer of that same year. Article 11 of the club's charter reads:

"[The Orpheus Club's] object shall be in the attainment of the greatest possible excellence in the performance of part songs for male voice."

In the first season, 319 men were proposed and elected as associate members. Headquarters were in a room in the A.P.A. building at 1415 Locust Street. That location was soon abandoned, however, in favor of more satisfactory quarters at the northwest corner of 12th and Chestnut Streets, where meetings and rehearsals were held for five additional seasons.

During the club's second season, in addition to three concerts at the hall owned by the Musical Fund Society, the club made its first appearance at the Academy of Music. Its members sang two works in a program marking the 100th anniversary of the Boston Tea Party on December 17, 1873.

In May 1889, the club moved to the Academy of Music, having outgrown the capacity of the Musical Fund Hall.

=== 20th century ===
In 1928, after several moves, the male singing club settled permanently in the clubhouse that, as of June 2012, continues to exist at 254 South Van Pelt Street.

== Euredice Chorus ==
The Euredice Chorus was formed in November 1886 on identical lines as the Orpheus Club: for the purpose of singing choral works written for women's voices. The women of Euredice gave two concerts each year and it was reported that the quality of their work was excellent. For over 25 years, Euredice shared conductors with Orpheus, used the club's rehearsal room and sang in many concerts with the men of the Orpheus Club.

== Guest artists ==
Through the years, the club has been assisted by a list of guest artists whose abilities and artistic talents have enhanced the reputation of the Orpheus Club. These have included Maude Powell, violinist, who accompanied and played in no less than seven formal concerts between 1886 and 1897; Victor Herbert, cellist (1896); Pablo Casals, cellist (1904); Marcel Tabuteau, oboist: William Kinkaid, flautist: Louise Homer, operatic contralto; David Bisham, baritone (coincidentally a member of the Orpheus Club and a star of the Metropolitan Opera); Noah Swayne and Wilbur Evans, bassos (also members of the Orpheus Club).

== Charitable work ==
The members of the Orpheus Club established a tradition of performing for charity as early as June 9, 1873, when they gave an open-air concert at Belmont Mansion for the benefit of the Children's Hospital.

== Traditions ==
A favorite Club tradition is private singing after rehearsals, when members retire to an upstairs meeting room at the Club house for a Round Table, which involves the participation of guests who are introduced and invited to sing a song or tell a story, after which they are required to call upon anyone in the room to follow suit. And so it goes from member to member until all in the room have contributed.

The Orpheus Club presents an annual Twelfth Night Revels performance, a yearly production given at the Annual Dinner since 1893, which has become something of "an honored tradition". The musical review is written, produced, acted and directed by a group of singing members and includes popular songs (current and ancient) with appropriate lyrics all held together by a somewhat tenuous plot. Many of the Round Table contributions have found inspiration from these shows.

In early June the club gathers for its Annual Outing, using the grounds of Philadelphia Cricket Club for a day of sports, singing and fellowship, culminating in the traditional dinner and singing on into the night. An important aim of the Orpheus fellowship is to pass on these occasions to its younger members.
