= Le Pauvre Matelot =

Opera by Darius Milhaud

- Opera by Darius Milhaud
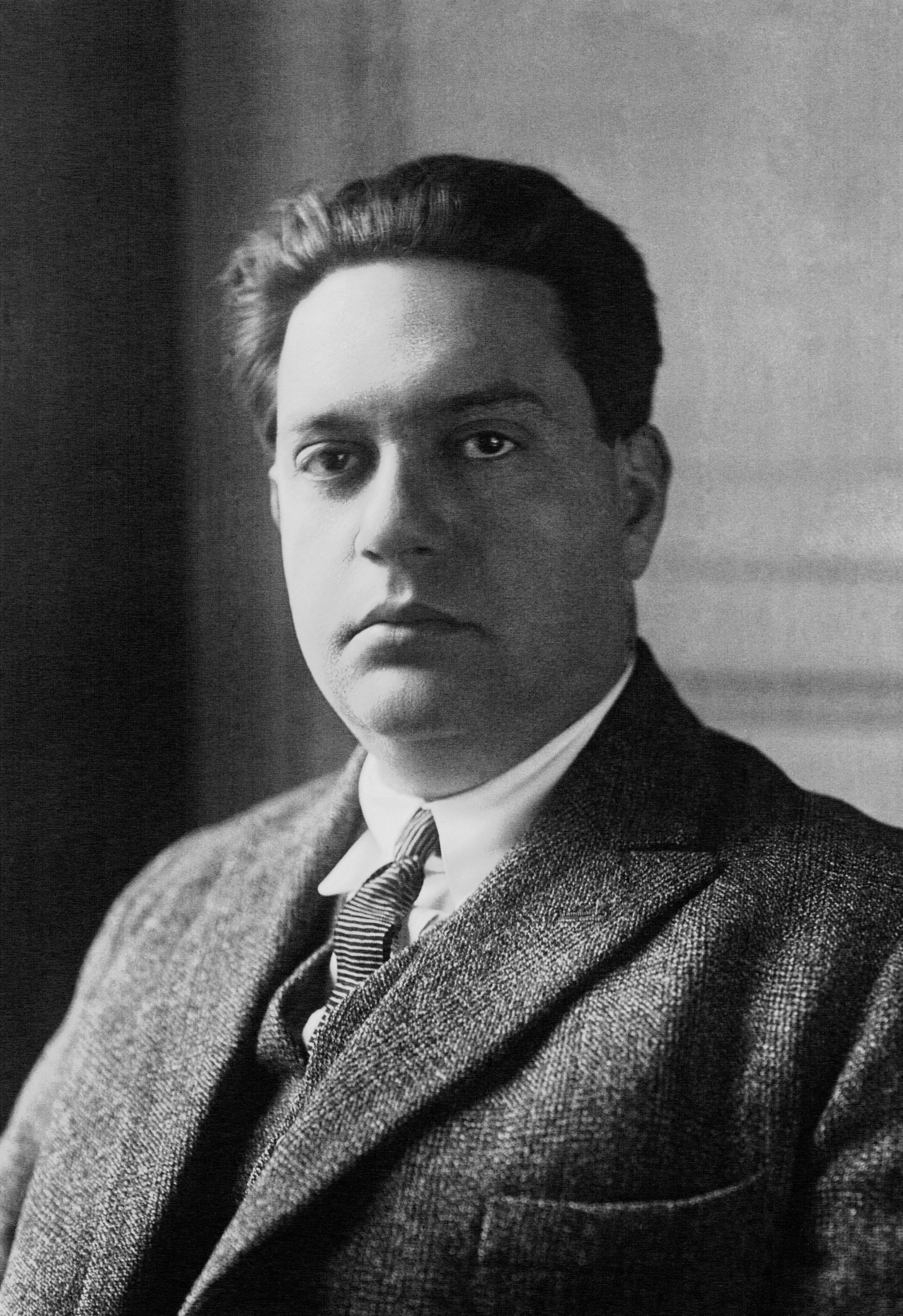
- Milhaud in 1923
- Librettist: Jean Cocteau
- Language: French
- Premiere: 16 December 1927; Salle Favart, Paris

Le Pauvre Matelot (The Poor Sailor) is a three-act opera (described as a 'complainte') composed by Darius Milhaud with libretto by Jean Cocteau. It was given its premiere on 16 December 1927 by the Opéra-Comique at the Salle Favart in Paris. Le pauvre matelot is short, lasting about 35 minutes when performed, and is dedicated to Henri Sauguet. The composer conducted a complete recording with forces of the Paris Opera in 1956. Although Cocteau claimed that the story was inspired by a news item in a paper, the scenario can be found in a 17th-century Franco-Canadian song 'Le Funeste Retour', and the tragedy Der vierundzwanzigste Februar by Werner of 1808.

== Performance history ==
The work was a successful part of a triple bill at La Monnaie in Brussels at the end of 1927 conducted by Corneil de Thoran, preceded by the premiere of Antigone by Honegger, and followed by Shéhérazade. The German premiere was at the Kroll with Zemlinsky conducting in 1929 and with Novotná in the cast. In 1934 an amended orchestrated version was produced in Geneva under Scherchen in tandem with L'Histoire du Soldat then in Vienna, and the work was revived at the Opéra-Comique the following year. Turin, Florence and Prague saw local first performances in 1934 and 1935.

The United States premiere of the opera, produced by the Curtis Institute of Music, took place on 1 April 1937 at the Philadelphia Academy of Music in a production directed by Austrian composer, librettist, and stage director Ernst Lert and using set and costume designs by Tony Award winning designer Donald Oenslager. The opera was presented in a double bill with the world premiere of Gian Carlo Menotti's Amelia Goes to the Ball. Both operas were conducted by Fritz Reiner with Sylvan Levin serving as chorus master and a young Boris Goldovsky working as Assistant Conductor. The Milhaud/Menotti double bill played later that month in Baltimore at the city's Lyric Theatre and at the New Amsterdam Theatre in New York City.

Kaminski describes the work as the most often performed of Milhaud's operas.

== Roles ==
Role	Voice type	Premiere Cast, 16 December 1927 (Conductor: Georges Lauweryns)
The wife	soprano	Madeleine Sibille
The sailor	tenor	Legrand
His father-in-law	bass	Félix Vieuille
His friend	baritone	Louis Musy

== Synopsis ==
The setting of the opera is in the present at a seaport.

=== Act 1 ===
The wife keeps a bar where most of the action takes place, and the opera opens with her dancing with the friend, who owns a wineshop across the street. The sailor has been gone for 15 years, with the Wife waiting faithfully for him to return. The friend encourages her chastity, and he admires her ability to do so despite living at a port. The wife responds that she would possibly have cheated were her husband present, but since he is gone, she feels it would not be the right thing to do. She also notes that no man has truly inspired her to be unchaste. Her father would rather that she take a new man who can run her bar, while the friend has repeatedly had his advances rejected by the wife. She reasons that she must not marry the friend, for it would make an awkward situation were the sailor to return and find his wife married to his friend. The father-in-law disagrees with his daughter's views, as she would take the sailor back whether he returns poor or rich.

The friend returns to his shop, and after he leaves, the father-in-law states he thinks the friend and the wife would make a good couple. The wife continues to disagree, claiming she still believes her husband will return, and that she will remain faithful until this happens. The two begin to bicker, with the father-in-law reminding her she is now 40 years old as they begin to leave the stage. It is at this point that the sailor can be observed outside the bar on the street, where he almost enters, but decides not to open the door. He is not sure his wife will recognize him, as no one else has. He instead decides to visit his friend to see what reaction his appearance has.

Upon knocking at the friend's door, the sailor is first turned away as a drunkard, but his mentioning of having a wife across the street makes his identity known. The sailor is glad he avoided the bar, as his 15 years of travel have changed him greatly. When he asks about his wife, the friend assures him of her faithfulness and that she has been waiting for him. The sailor then tells his friend that he now had the money to take care of their needs. The friend believes that the sailor should go right away to his wife, but the sailor instead wants to stay the night and meet his wife as stranger, a feeling brought on by his time away.

=== Act 2 ===
The following day, the sailor heads over to the bar and poses as a messenger from her husband. He tells his wife that the sailor has returned, but will not come until nighttime, as he is being chased by creditors. His wife says that she too is without money. The sailor does not believe a woman as pretty as his wife could be without money, and the father-in-law makes a sound in agreement. The wife, however, is overjoyed that her husband will soon be returning to her. She is also told that had the sailor agreed to love a cannibal queen, he may have returned to her rich, but she does not care. The sailor acts as a shipmate of himself, and shows pearls as the reward he instead received for becoming that lover. The sailor then asks for a room for the night, and is granted his request as he has brought such good news and asks for so little. The friend is interested to know what happened, and makes an excuse to visit by returning a hammer lent to him by the wife the other day. The wife remains silent on the visitor, but as she closes the bar for the night, does see a similarity in the appearance of the sailor to her husband.

=== Act 3 ===
As the sailor lies asleep, his wife comes in with the newly returned hammer. She raises the hammer at the sailor, but decides against this action. She then coughs, and he does not react. The Wife again raises the hammer, and this time hits the Sailor on the head with it. She strikes him again when he convulses, then releases the hammer so she can remove the goods from his pocket. The father-in-law is woken up by the commotion, and he decides they will carry the body to the rain-water tank. They plan on telling the neighbor that the visitor left very early, and when the neighbor then knocks at the door, they keep silent and the neighbor leaves. As they make ready to bring the body to the tank, the wife happily sings of the nearing return of her husband.

== Sources ==
- Kobbé, Gustav. The Definitive Kobbé's Book of Opera. Ed. The Earl of Harewood. 1st American ed. New York: G.P. Putnam's and Sons, 1987. 1040–1041.
