= Maxine Stellman =

American opera soprano (1906–1972)

- Maxine Stellman, from a 1936 newspaper
- Born: Maxine Elliot Stellman; May 13, 1906; Brattleboro, Vermont
- Died: June 24, 1972 (aged 66); Brattleboro, Vermont
- Other names: Maxine Stellman Caruso
- Occupation: Opera singer

Maxine Elliot Stellman Caruso (May 13, 1906 – June 24, 1972) was an American opera singer, a soprano with the Metropolitan Opera in the 1930s and 1940s.

== Early life and education ==
Stellman was from Brattleboro, Vermont, the daughter of Wilhelm Elliot Stellman and Lillian Lucinda Miller Stellman. Her father was a machine manufacturer. She graduated from Juilliard in 1934. She stayed at Juilliard for graduate studies with Belle Julie Soudant, Marcella Sembrich and Florence Page Kimball.

== Career ==
Stellman was a featured soloist with the Chautauqua Institution's symphony orchestra as a young woman. She was the female winner of the 1937 Metropolitan Opera Auditions of the Air, a talent contest program which awarded a cash prize and a singing role in a spring production.

Stellman's appearances with the Metropolitan Opera included soprano roles in Orfeo ed Euridice (1936), The Man Without a Country (1937), Aïda (1938), Madama Butterfly (1940), Die Walküre (1940), Il Trovatore and The Marriage of Figaro (1941), Manon (1942), Lohengrin (1942), Louise (1943), Tannhäuser (1943), Carmen (1943), La Traviata (1943), The Magic Flute (1945), Rigoletto (1945), Der Rosenkavalier (1945), Lakmé (1946), Faust (1947), Hansel and Gretel (1947), and Lucia di Lammermoor (1950). She also toured with Met productions, and was regularly heard in the Metropolitan Opera's radio broadcasts in the 1940s. She made national headlines when she was called in to sing "Elsa" in Lohengrin in Boston in 1942, a role she had never performed before, when Astrid Varnay fell ill.

== Personal life ==
In 1933, Maxine Stellman married fellow opera singer Joseph W. Caruso, a Sicilian-born tenor with the Metropolitan Opera. The Carusos owned the William Harris House in Brattleboro, one of the oldest buildings in Vermont. She died in 1972, at the age of 66.
