= Heinrich Conrad Schleinitz =

German opera singer

Heinrich Conrad Schleinitz (born 1805 in Zechanitz for chub; died 1881 in Leipzig) was a German jurist and tenor.

Schleinitz was born in 1805, the son of a school headmaster in Zechanitz. He was a pupil at the Thomas School in Leipzig . After graduation, he studied law at the University of Leipzig . He received a doctorate in the Dr. iur. and worked as a lawyer in Leipzig. Later he received a musical education. He entered 1830 as a tenor at a festival in Halle in 1848 and sang Mendelssohn's Elijah in Leipzig. After him to the Board of the Leipzig Gewandhaus ordered, he set in 1835 for Felix Mendelssohn Bartholdy, Office of the Gewandhaus one. Between the two was a lifelong friendship. So he was A Midsummer Night's Dream and night song dedicated. After Mendelssohn's death in 1847, he became director of the Leipzig Conservatory . Schleinitz died in 1881, in almost complete blindness, in Leipzig.

== Sources ==
- Biographie von Heinrich Conrad Schleinitz
