= Ernst Lert =

Austrian composer, writer and director (1883–1955)

Ernst Joseph Maria Lert, originally Ernst Joseph Maria Levy (1883, Vienna – 1955, New York City) was an Austrian stage director, writer, composer, librettist, and music historian. He was the brother of conductor Richard Lert who was married to writer Vicki Baum. He taught opera at the Curtis Institute of Music. One of his pupils was the soprano Selma Amansky.

Lert studied music history, piano, and singing at the University of Vienna. In 1909 he was appointed the "regisseur" of the opera house in Breslau where he remained for three years. In 1912 he became the director of the Oper Leipzig where he remained for seven years. In 1919 he took the position of theatre director at the Theater Basel, but left there a year later to become theatre director at the Opern- und Schauspielhaus Frankfurt. In 1924 he joined the directing staff at La Scala, leaving there in 1929 to become a theatre director at the Metropolitan Opera in New York City. He remained at the Met for two seasons. He spent his remaining career working as a freelance director with major theatres and opera houses internationally. He notably directed the world premiere of Gian Carlo Menotti's Amelia Goes to the Ball which was presented on April 1, 1937 at the Philadelphia Academy of Music.

As a music scholar, Lert published several biographies on notable musical figures and wrote the book Mozart auf dem Theater (Mozart and the Theatre, published 1918). He also contributed articles to numerous magazines, music journals, and newspapers. He wrote the libretto for Hugo Weisgall's The Tenor (1952) and wrote the German libretto for Riccardo Zandonai's Die Kavaliere von Ekeby (I cavalieri di Ekebù).
