= Edwina Eustis Dick =

American opera singer

Edwina Eustis Dick (1 September 1908 – 3 March 1997) was an American classical contralto and pioneer in the field of music therapy.

Born Edwina Eustis in New York City, she won a scholarship to study at the Juilliard School at the age of 16 where she earned a degree in vocal performance. She went on to have a substantial opera and concert career in North America from the late 1920s through the 1950s. After marrying her husband, attorney Alexander C. Dick, she performed and worked under the name Edwina Eustis Dick.

From 1930-1932 Eustis was a member of the Philadelphia Grand Opera Company, where she portrayed such roles as Maddalena in Rigoletto, Margret in Wozzeck, Marthe in Faust, the Witch in Hänsel und Gretel, and Floßhilde and Grimgerde in The Ring Cycle among others. She was also a regular soloist with the Philadelphia Orchestra during the 1930s in concerts of operatic works and in works from the standard concert repertoire, a collaboration which resulted in several recordings. She also notably portrayed 'Amelia's friend' in the world premiere of Gian Carlo Menotti's Amelia Goes to the Ball on 1 April 1937 at the Philadelphia Academy of Music.

Outside of Philadelphia, Eustis performed with opera companies in New York City, Detroit, Chicago, Boston, and New Orleans among others. She also sang with many of the leading orchestras in the United States, including the New York Philharmonic, the Boston Symphony Orchestra, the Cleveland Orchestra, and the Chicago Symphony Orchestra. During World War II, she traveled around the world performing in more than a 1,000 United Service Organizations concerts. She retired from her performance career in the late 1950s.

After the end of the War, Eustis devoted much of her time and interests towards the study of "music therapy", a term that wasn't even in wide use yet at that time. In the late 1940s, she undertook a pioneering project at a Long Island hospital to explore the therapeutic role music could play in treating the mentally ill. She continued to work actively as a music therapist for many years, and eventually became a highly respected educator within the field. An annual scholarship in her name is offered by the American Music Therapy Association. She died in Southbury, Connecticut at the age of 88.

== Awards and honors ==
In 1995, she received an honorary doctorate of humane letters from the College of Charleston.
