= Chronological list of operatic sopranos =

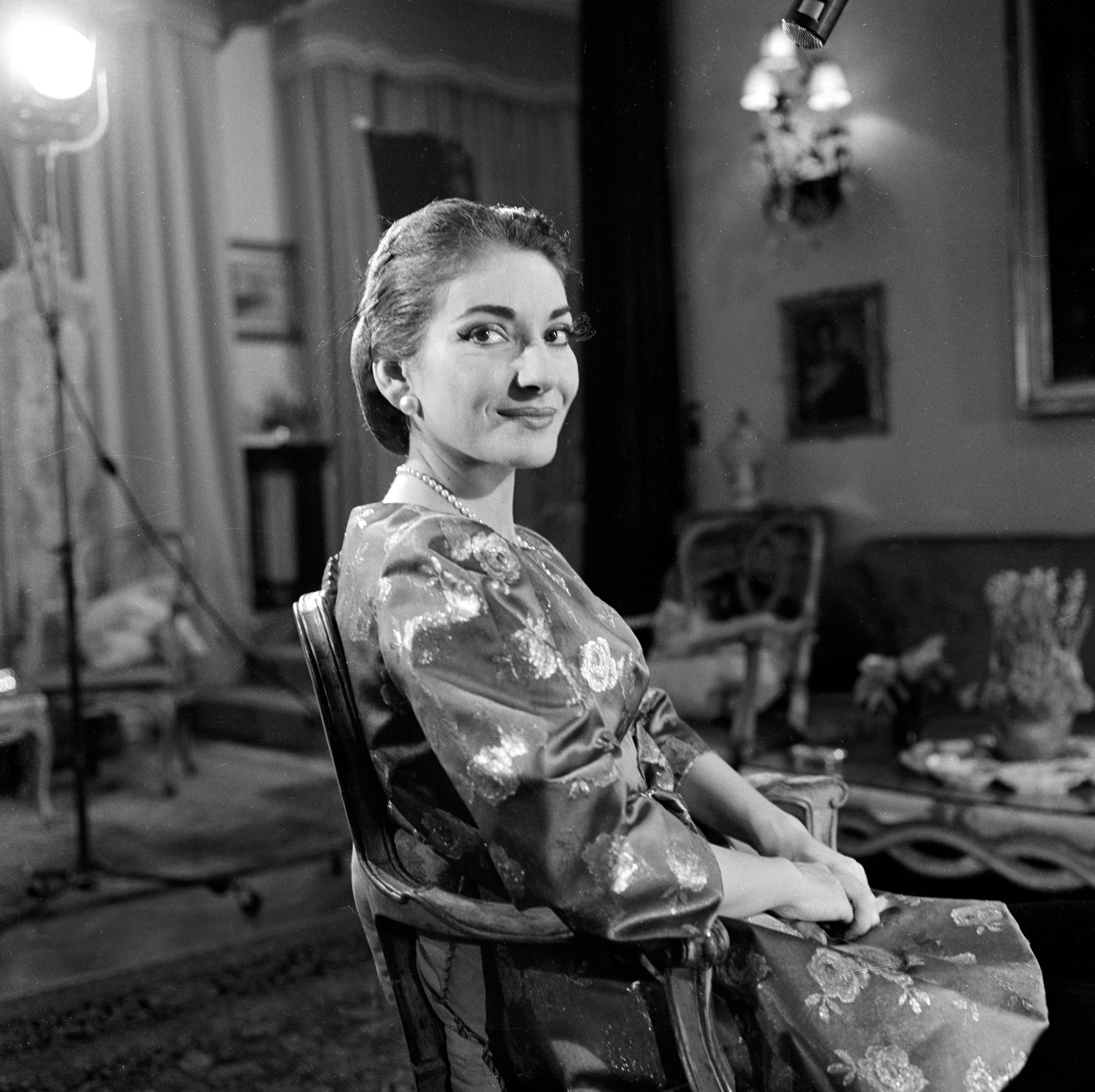
Maria Callas

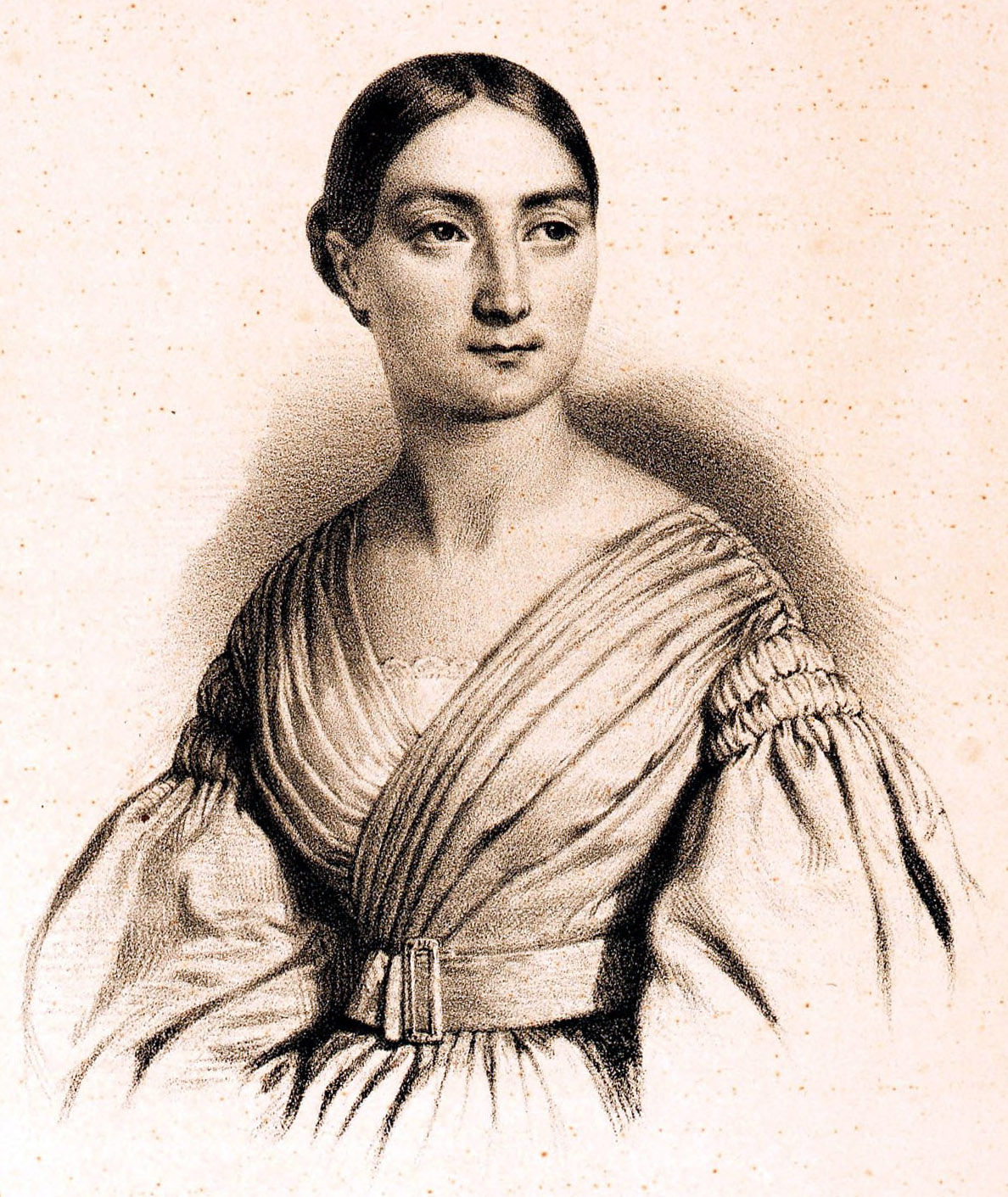
Cornélie Falcon

This is a chronological list of soprano who have performed in operas from classical music of the Western world. The list spans from operatic sopranos active in the first operas of the late 16th century to singers currently performing. Singers who have recorded opera arias or sung them in concert but have never performed in an opera are not included in this list. Singers are sorted by their year of birth. Those singers whose birth year is unknown are sorted by the first year that they are known to have flourished. This list should not include singers who have never performed in a staged opera with the exception of historic non-white singers who were barred from the opera stage in varying parts of the world due to discrimination prior to the mid-20th century.

== Born in the 15th and 16th centuries ==
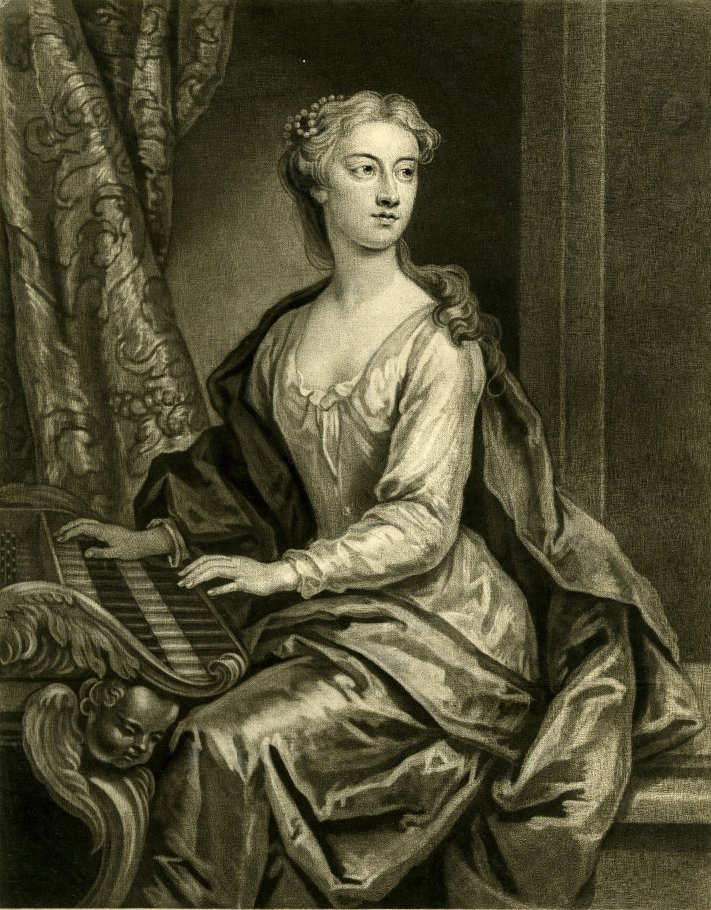
Anastasia Robinson

=== Before 1600 ===
- Vittoria Archilei (fl. 1582 – c. 1620)
- Virginia Ramponi-Andreini (1583– c. 1630)
- Caterina Martinelli (1589 or 1590–1608)
- Settimia Caccini (1591– c. 1638)

=== 1600–1649 ===
- Margherita Costa (c.1600– after 1657)
- Anna Renzi (b. 1620– after 1661)
- Anne Chabanceau de La Barre (1628–1688)

=== 1650–1699 ===
- Antonia Coresi (fl. 1655 – c. 1674)
- Marie Aubry (c.1656–1704)
- Marie Le Rochois (c. 1658–1728)
- Mlle Saint-Christophle (fl. 1663 – c. 1682)
- Maria Landini (c. 1668–1722)
- Fanchon Moreau (1668– after 1743)
- Louison Moreau (fl. 1668 – c. 1692)
- Maria Maddalena Musi (1669–1751)
- Vittoria Tarquini (1670–1746)
- Anne Bracegirdle (1671–1748)
- Mary Hodgson (1673–1719?)
- Diamante Maria Scarabelli (1675–1754)
- Françoise Journet (1675–1722)
- Giulia Francesca Zuffi (fl. 1678 – c. 1685)
- Margherita de L'Épine (c. 1680–1746)
- Elisabetta Pilotti-Schiavonetti (c. 1680–1742)
- Marie-Louise Desmatins (fl. 1682 – c. 1708)
- Letitia Cross (1682–1737)
- Margarita Salicola (fl. 1682 – c. 1706)
- Anna Maria Torri (fl. 1684 – c. 1708)
- Marianna Bulgarelli (c. 1684–1734)
- Catherine Tofts (c. 1685–1756)
- Santa Stella (c. 1686–1759)
- Marie Antier (1687–1747)
- Johanna Elisabeth Döbricht (1692–1786)
- Anastasia Robinson (c. 1692–1755)
- Rosa Borosini (c. 1693– after 1740)
- Livia Nannini Costantini (fl. 1695 – c. 1726)
- Francesca Cuzzoni (1696–1778)

== Born in the 18th century ==
=== 1700–1739 ===
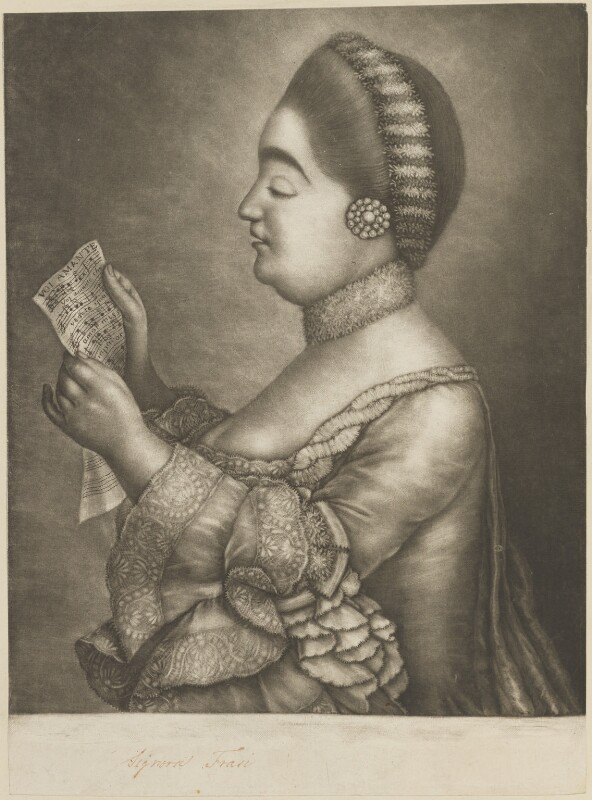
Giulia Frasi

- Margherita Durastanti (fl. 1700 – c. 1734)
- Maria Giustina Turcotti (c. 1700– after 1763)
- Joanna Maria Lindehleim (fl. 1702 – died 1724)
- Maria Gallia (fl. 1703 – c. 1734)
- Catherine-Nicole Lemaure (1704–1786)
- Marie Pélissier (1706 or 1707–1749)
- Isabella Girardeau (fl. 1709 – c. 1712)
- Mademoiselle Petitpas (1710–1739)
- Kitty Clive (1711–1785)
- Maria Manina (fl. 1712 – c. 1736)
- Cecilia Young (1712–1789)
- Marie Fel (1713–1794)
- Ann Turner Robinson (fl. 1714 – died 1741)
- Élisabeth Duparc (c. 1715–1778)
- Elisabeth Lillström (1717–1791)
- Anna Maria Strada (fl. 1719 – c. 1741)
- Celeste Gismondi (fl. 1722 – died 1735)
- Regina Mingotti (1722–1808)
- Teresa Cornelys (1723–1797)
- Christina Maria Avoglio (fl. 1727 – c. 1746)
- Giulia Frasi (c. 1730–1772)
- Antonia Maria Girelli (c. 1730- after 1773)
- Anna Lucia de Amicis (c. 1733–1816)
- Margherita Chimenti (fl. 1733 – c. 1746)
- Marie-Jeanne Larrivée Lemière (1733–1786)
- Dorothea Wendling (1736–1811)
- Yelizaveta Belogradskaya (1739– c. 1764)

=== 1740s ===
- Sophie Arnould (1740–1802)
- Elisabeth Olin (1740–1828)
- Antonia Bernasconi (1741–1803)
- Lucrezia Aguiari (born 1743 or 1746–1783)
- Maria Anna Fesemayr (1743–1782)
- Marie-Thérèse Laruette (1744–1837)
- Elisabeth Wendling (1746–1786)
- Maria Anna Braunhofer (1748–1819)
- Franziska Romana Koch (1748–1796)
- Hedvig Wigert (1748–1780)
- Rosalie Levasseur (1749–1826)
- Giovanna Sestini (1749–1814)

=== 1750s ===
- Lovisa Augusti (1751–1790)
- Maddalena Allegranti (1754–1802)
- Josepha Duschek (1754–1824)
- Cecilia Davies (1756 or 1757–1836)
- Antoinette Saint-Huberty (1756–1812)
- Brigida Banti (c. 1757–1806)
- Caterina Bondini (1757– after 1791)
- Harriett Abrams (c. 1758–1821)
- Marie Louise Marcadet (1758–1804)
- Josepha Weber (1758–1819)
- Adriana Ferrarese del Bene (1759– after 1803)

=== 1760s ===
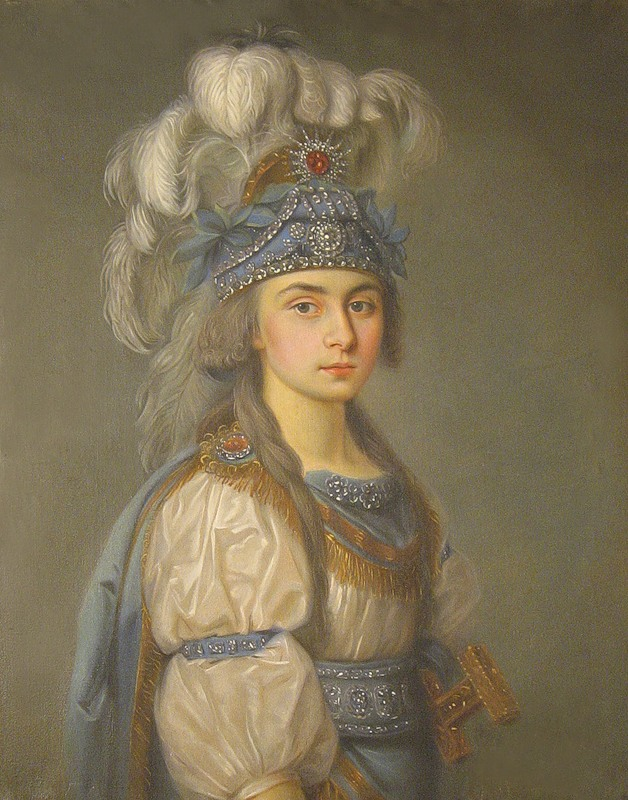
Praskovia Kovalyova-Zhemchugova

- Friederike Bethmann-Unzelmann (1760–1815)
- Celeste Coltellini (1760–1828)
- Luisa Laschi (1760–c.1790)
- Aloysia Weber (c. 1760–1839)
- Christina Rahm (1763–1837)
- Teresa Saporiti (1763–1869)
- Christiane Haßloch (1764–1829)
- Jeanne-Charlotte Schroeder (1764–1850)
- Sofia Liljegren (1765–1795)
- Nancy Storace (1765–1817)
- Adélaïde Gavaudan (1767–1805)
- Rose Renaud (1767–c. 1840)
- Praskovia Kovalyova-Zhemchugova (1768–1803)
- Julie-Angélique Scio (1768–1807)
- Marianne Willmann (1768–1813)

=== 1770s ===
- Marianne Sessi (born c.1770–1776 – died 1847)
- Magdalena Willmann (1771–1801)
- Marianne Müller (1772–1851)
- Antonia Campi (1773–1822)
- Margarete Luise Schick (1773–1809)
- Tatyana Shlykova (1773–1863)
- Therese Rosenbaum (1774–1837)
- Teresa Bertinotti (1776–1854)
- Jane Bianchi (1776–1858)
- Maria Anna Tauber (fl. 1777 – c. 1779)
- Friederike Vohs (1777–1860)

=== 1780s ===
- Alexandrine-Caroline Branchu (1780–1850)
- Margherita Chabran (born 1780?)
- Elisabetta Manfredini-Guarmani (1780–1828)
- Angelica Catalani (1780–1849)
- Joaquina Sitches (1780–1864)
- Alexandrine Marie Agathe Gavaudan-Ducamel (1781–1850)
- Violante Camporesi (1785–1839)
- Charlotte Häser (1784–1871)
- Louise Müller (1784–1837)
- Jeanette Wässelius (1784–1853)
- Isabella Colbran (1785–1845)
- Cécile Duret-Saint-Aubin (1785–1862)
- Anna Milder-Hauptmann (1785–1838)
- Antonia Laucher (1786–1871)
- Antoinette Lemonnier (1787–1866)
- Franziska Sontag (1787 or 1789–1865)
- Margarethe Carl (1788–1861)
- Cathinka Buchwieser (1789–1828)
- Joséphine Fodor (1789 or 1793–1870)
- Marie Zinck (1789–1823)

=== 1790s ===
- Carolina Crespi (c.1790– after 1842)
- Karoline Seidler-Wranitzky (1790–1872)
- Anna Maria Sessi (1790–1864)
- Anna Sofia Sevelin (1790–1871)
- Augustine Albert (1791– after 1846)
- Fanny Corri-Paltoni (1791 or 1792–1861)
- Therese Grünbaum (1791–1876)
- Ester Mombelli (1792– after 1827)
- Benedetta Rosmunda Pisaroni (1793–1872)
- Alexandrine Saint-Aubin (1793–1867)
- Justina Casagli (1794–1841)
- Zulmé Dabadie (1795–1877)
- Caroline Grassari (1795– after 1832)
- Friederike Funk (1796– after 1863)
- Henriette Widerberg (1796–1872)
- Caroline Willmann (1796– c. 1860)
- Giuditta Pasta (1797–1865)
- Anna Bondra (1798–1836)
- Henriette Méric-Lalande (1799–1867)
- Clara Vespermann (1799–1827)

== Born in the 19th century ==
=== 1800s ===
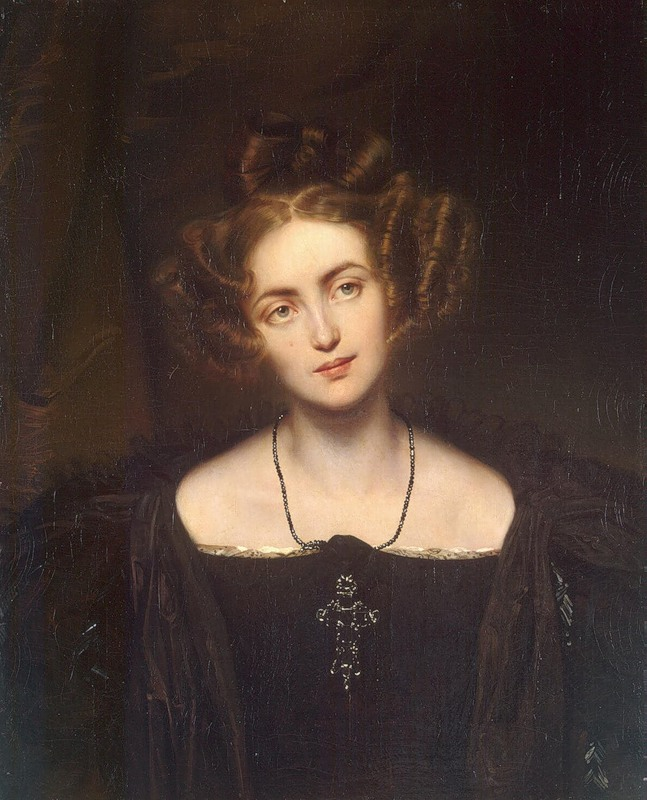
Henriette Sontag

1800

- Elizabeth Austin (c. 1800 – after 1835)
- Luigia Boccabadati (1800–1850)
- Rosalbina Caradori-Allan (1800–1865)
- Emilie Pohlmann (c. 1800–1875)
- Giuseppina Ronzi de Begnis (1800–1853)
- Henriette Spitzeder (1800–1828)
- Karoline Stern (1800–1885)
- Adelaide Tosi (c. 1800–1859)

1801

- Laure Cinti-Damoreau (1801–1863)

1802

- Mary Ann Paton (1802–1864)
- Geneviève-Aimé-Zoë Prévost (1802–1861)

1803

- Emilie da Fonseca (1803–1884)
- Margarethe Stockhausen (1803–1877)

1804

- Wilhelmina Enbom (1804–1880)
- Nanette Schechner (1804–1860)

1801

- Wilhelmine Schröder-Devrient (1804–1860)

1805

- Caterina Canzi (1805–1890)
- Julie Dorus-Gras (1805–1896)

1806

- Fanny Ayton (1806–1891)
- Caroline Fischer-Achten (1806–1896)
- Anna Fischer-Maraffa (1806–1866)
- Henriette Sontag (1806–1854)

1807

- Giacinta Toso (1807–1889)

1808

- Franziska Cornet (1808–1870)
- Jane Shirreff (1808–1883)
- Eugenia Tadolini (1808–1872)

1809

- Sabine Heinefetter (1809–1872)
- Maria Theresia Löw (1809–1885)
- Nadezhda Repina (1809–1867)

=== 1810s ===
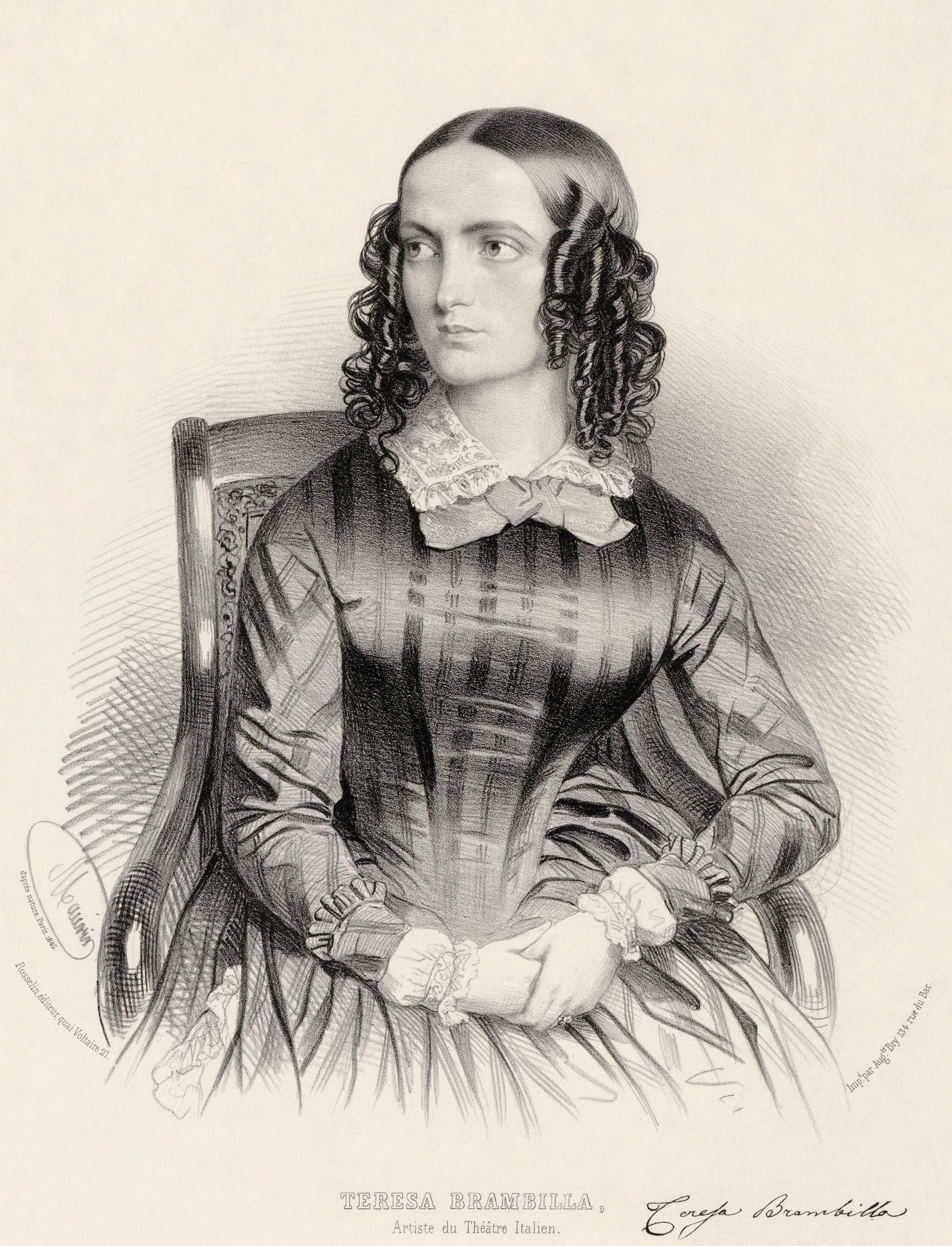
Teresa Brambilla

1810

- Anna Bishop (1810–1884)
- Konstancja Gładkowska (1810–1889)

1811

- Pauline Decker (1811–1882)
- Giulia Grisi (1811–1869)
- Elisa Orlandi (1811–1834)

1812

- Fanny Tacchinardi Persiani (1812–1867)

1813

- Teresa Brambilla (1813–1895)
- Maria Flécheux (1813–1842)

1814

- Cornélie Falcon (1814–1897)
- Mathilda Gelhaar (1814–1889)

1815

- Anna Bochkoltz-Falconi (1815–1879)
- Rita Gabussi (c.1815–1891)
- Fanny Salvini-Donatelli (1815–1891)
- Antonietta Marini-Rainieri (c. 1815–1870)
- Mariya Stepanova (1815–1903)
- Giuseppina Strepponi (1815–1897)

1816

- Mademoiselle Monrose (1816–1893)
- Catharine Simonsen (1816–1849)
- Klara Stöckl-Heinefetter (1816–1857)

1817

- Teresa De Giuli Borsi (1817–1877)
- Adelina Catalani (fl. 1818 – c. 1832)
- Marianna Barbieri-Nini (1818–1887)
- Euphrasie Borghèse (born 1818)
- Livia Frege (1818–1891)
- Erminia Frezzolini (1818–1884)
- Clara Novello (1818–1908)
- Louise Sahlgreen (1818–1891)

1819

- Jeanne-Anaïs Castellan (1819– after 1858)
- Wilhelmina Fundin (1819–1911)
- Kathinka Heinefetter (1819–1858)
- Anna Thillon (1819-1903)

=== 1820s ===
1820

- Sophie Diez (1820–1887)
- Jenny Lind (1820–1887)
- Mathilde Wildauer (1820–1878)

1821
1822

- Julie Berwald (1822–1877)
- Anna Zerr (1822–1881)

1823

- Augusta Albertini (1823–1898)
- Louise Lavoye (1823–1897)
- Rosina Penco (1823–1894)
- Paulina Rivoli (1823–1881)

1824

- Eliza Biscaccianti (1824–1896)
- Jenny Bürde-Ney (1824–1886)
- Marietta Gazzaniga (1824–1884)
- Rosine Laborde (1824–1907)

1825

- Therese Braunecker-Schäfer (1825–1888)
- Malvina Garrigues (1825–1904)
- Anna de La Grange (1825–1905)
- Balbina Steffenone (1825–1896)

1826

- Marie Carandini (1826–1894)
- Sophie Cruvelli (1826–1907)
- Mathilda Ebeling (1826–1851)

1827

- Marie Cabel (1827–1885)
- Rosa von Milde (1827–1906)
- Marie Caroline Miolan-Carvalho (1827–1895)
- Teresa Parodi (1827– after 1878)
- Margherita Zenoni (c. 1827–1878)

1828

- Clara M. Brinkerhoff (1828– after 1901)
- Rebecca Isaacs (1828–1877)
- Caroline Lefebvre (1828–1905)
- Maria Spezia-Aldighieri (1828–1907)

1829

- Luisa Cappiani (1829–1919)
- Lucy Escott (1829–1895)
- Delphine Ugalde (1829–1910)

=== 1830s ===
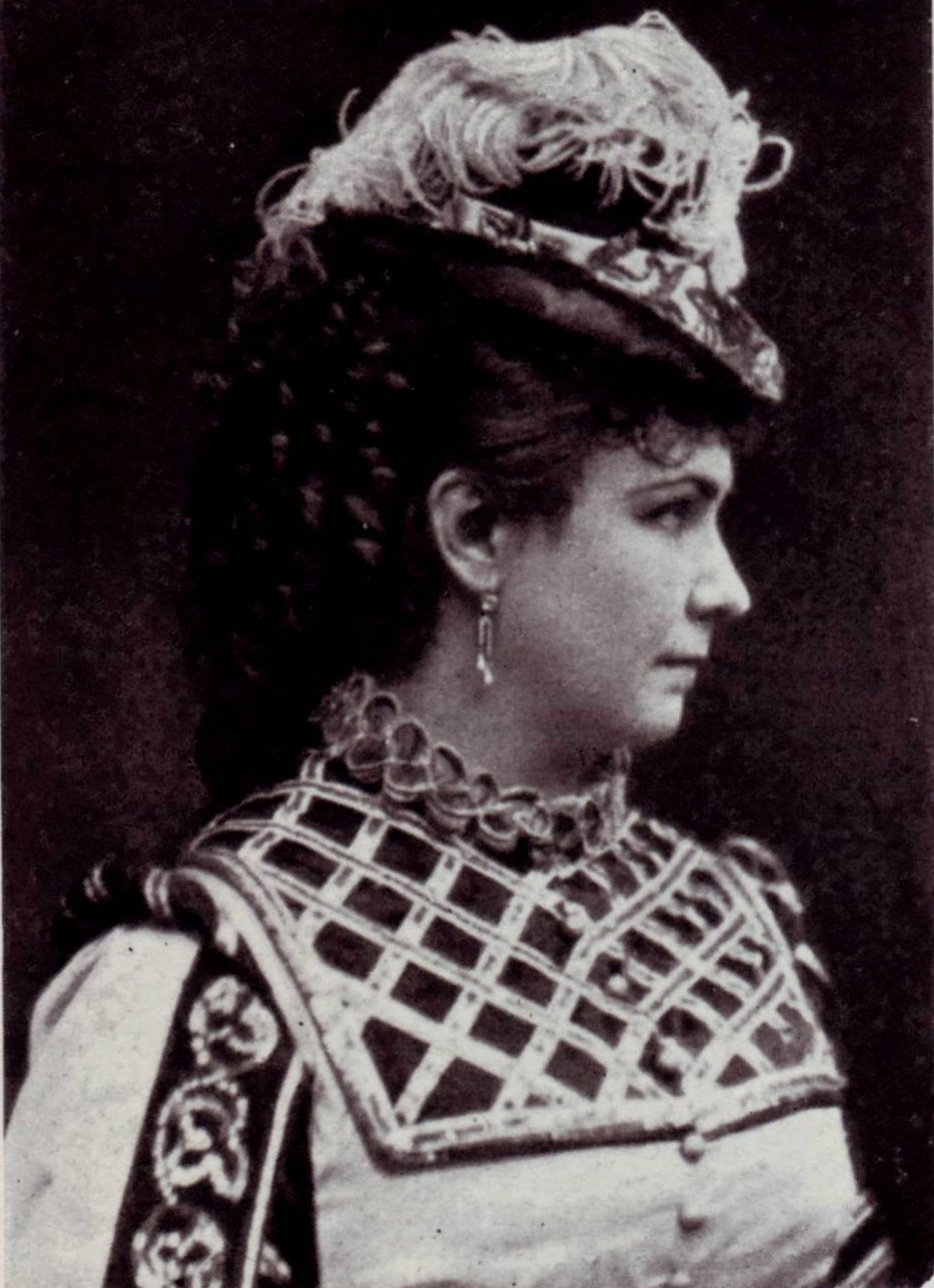
Marie Geistinger

1830

- Caroline Barbot (1830–1893)
- Angiolina Bosio (1830–1859)
- Caroline Girard (born 1830)
- Louise Michaëli (1830–1875)

1831

- Inez Fabbri (1831–1909)
- Emmy La Grua (1831–1922)
- Luise Meyer-Dustmann (1831–1899)
- Marcella Lotti della Santa (1831–1901)
- Thérèse Tietjens (1831–1877)

1832

- Caroline Duprez (1832–1875)
- Eleonora Ehrenbergová (1832–1912)

1833

- Mathilda Enequist (1833–1898)
- Hortense Schneider (1833–1920)
- Marie Wilt (1833–1891)

1834

- Ottilie Genée (1834–1911)
- Pauline Guéymard-Lauters (1834–1918)
- Helen Lemmens-Sherrington (1834–1906)
- Luise Limbach (1834–1909)
- Angiolina Ortolani-Tiberini (1834–1913)
- Marietta Piccolomini (1834–1899)
- Ema Pukšec (1834–1889)
- Marie Sasse (1834–1907)
- Teresa Stolz (1834–1902)
- Lise Tautin (1834–1874)

1835

- Désirée Artôt (1835–1907)
- Léontine de Maësen (1835–1906)
- Carlotta Marchisio (1835–1872)
- Carlotta Patti (1835–1889)
- Fanny Simonsen (c.1835–1896)

1836

- Eufrosyne Abrahamson (1836–1869)
- Marie Geistinger (1836–1903)
- Friederike Grün (1836–1917)
- Bernardine Hamaekers (1836–1912)
- Louise Harriers-Wippern (1836–1878)
- Euphrosyne Parepa-Rosa (1836–1874)
- Fredrika Stenhammar (1836–1880)

1837

- Wilhelmina Gelhaar (1837–1923)
- Signe Hebbe (1837–1925)
- Lucille Tostée (1837–1874)

1838

- Marie Battu (1838–1919)
- Julia Espín y Pérez de Collbrand (1838–1906)
- Adele Passy-Cornet (1838–1915)
- Sophie Stehle (1838–1921)

1839

- Carolina Ferni (1839–1926)
- Anna Henriette Levinsohn (1839–1899)
- Minna Peschka-Leutner (1839–1890)

=== 1840s ===
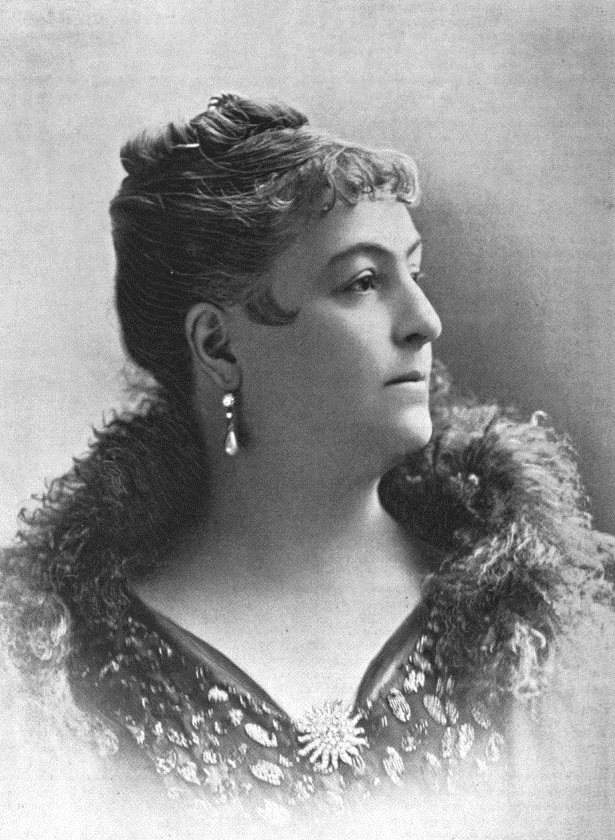
Lilli Lehmann

1840

- Antonietta Fricci (1840–1912)
- Júlia Gusztinyi (fl. 1840 – died 1849)

1841

- Zulma Bouffar (1841–1909)
- Marie Cico (1841–1875)
- Alice Ducasse (1841–1923)
- Pauline Lucca (1841–1908)
- Aglaja Orgeni (1841–1926)
- Yuliya Platonova (1841–1892)

1842

- Clara Louise Kellogg (1842–1916)
- Gabrielle Krauss (1842–1906)
- Melitta Otto-Alvsleben (1842–1893)
- Sarah Edith Wynne (1842–1897)

1843

- Anna Deinet (1843–1919)
- Laurence Grivot (1843–1890)
- Elisabeth Kohut-Mannstein (1843–1926)
- Christina Nilsson (1843–1921)
- Adelina Patti (1843–1919)

1844

- Emma Howson (1844–1928)
- Amalie Materna (1844–1918)
- Rosina Palmer (1844–1932)
- Hermine von Siegstädt (1844–1883)

1845

- Teresina Brambilla (1845–1921)
- Lina Frieb (1845–1876)
- Susan Galton (1845–1918)
- Rose Hersee (1845–1924)
- Anna Kaufmann (1845– died after 1870)
- Henriette Müller-Marion (1845–1921)
- Adelina Paschalis-Souvestre (1845–1925)
- Ángela Peralta (1845–1883)
- Therese Vogl (1845–1921)

1846

- Ida Basilier-Magelssen (1846–1928)
- Marie Roze (1846–1926)

1847

- Emma Albani (1847–1930)
- Emma Fursch-Madi (1847–1894)
- Fanny Holland (1847–1931)
- Mathilde Mallinger (1847–1920)
- Alice May (1847–1887)
- Romilda Pantaleoni (1847–1917)
- Julie Rosewald (1847–1906)

1848

- Alice Barth (1848–1910)
- Lona Gyldenkrone (1848–1934)
- Marie Hanfstängl (1848–1917)
- Lilli Lehmann (1848–1929)
- Virginia Naumann-Gungl (1848–1915)
- Eugenie Pappenheim (1848–1924)
- Alwina Valleria (1848–1925)
- Mathilde Weckerlin (1848–1928)

1849

- Émilie Ambre (1849–1898)
- Mathilde Bauermeister (1849–1926)
- Virginia Ferni Germano (1849–1934)
- Marie Haupt (1849–1928)
- Sallie Holman (1849–1888)
- Alice Oates (1849–1887)
- Marguerite Priola (1849–1876)
- Marie Selika Williams (c.1849–1937)
- Rosa Sucher (1849–1927)

=== 1850s ===
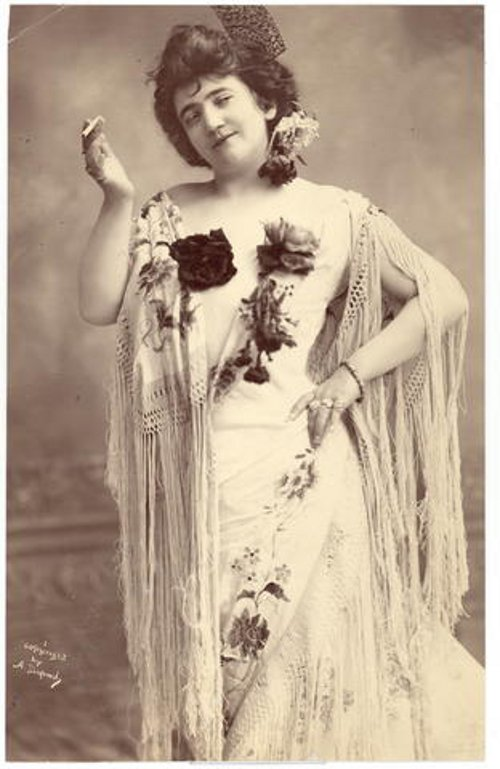
Emma Calvé

1850

- Emma Abbott (1850–1891)
- Nelly Bromley (1850–1939)
- Sophie Keller (1850–1929)
- Maddalena Mariani Masi (1850–1916)
- Selma Nicklass-Kempner (1850–1928)
- Amalia Riégo (1850–1926)
- Anna Sachse-Hofmeister (1850–1904)
- Clementine von Schuch-Proska (1850–1932)
- Teresina Singer (1850–1928)

1851

- Blanche Cole (1851–1888)
- Minnie Hauk (1851–1929)
- Marie Heilbron (1851–1886)
- Elise Wiedermann (1851–1922)

1852

- Marguerite Chapuy (1852–1936)
- Mathilda Grabow (1852–1940)
- Jeanne Granier (1852–1939)
- Thekla Hofer (1852–1938)
- Mila Kupfer-Berger (1852–1905)
- Mily-Meyer (1852–1927)

1853

- Anna D'Angeri (1853–1907)
- Leonora Braham 1853–1931)
- Carolina Östberg (1853–1924)
- Hedwig Reicher-Kindermann (1853–1883)
- Dora Wiley (1853–1924)

1854

- Marion Hood (1854–1912)
- Adèle Isaac (1854–1915)
- Laura Andrews Rhodes (1854–1909)
- Louise Théo (1854–1922)

1855

- Erminia Borghi-Mamo (1855–1941)
- Abigaille Bruschi-Chiatti (c. 1855–1888)
- Etelka Gerster (1855–1920)
- Katharina Klafsky (1855–1896)
- Augusta Lütken (1855–1910)
- Therese Malten (1855–1930)
- Fanny Moran-Olden (1855–1905)
- Giuseppina Pasqua (1855–1930)
- Josephine de Reszke (1855–1891)
- Bertha Schwarz (a.k.a. Bianca Bianchi, 1855–1947)
- Amy Sherwin (1855–1935)
- Marguerite Vaillant-Couturier (1855–1930)

1856

- Ada Adini (1856–1924)
- Marguerite Baux (born 1856)
- Abbie Carrington (1856–1925)
- Selma Ek (1856–1941)
- Alma Fohström (1856–1936)
- Hermine Galfy (1856–1933)
- Antonie Mielke (1856–1907)

1857

- Olga Björkegren (1857–1950)
- Rose Caron (1857–1930)
- Rose Delaunay (1857–1939)
- Adalgisa Gabbi (1857–1933)
- Conchita Gélabert (1857–1922)
- Lillian Nordica (1857–1914)
- Elena Teodorini (1857–1926)
- Giulia Warwick (1857–1904)

1858

- Emma Calvé (1858–1942)
- Minna Fischer (1858–1941)
- Maria Gelhaar (1858–1920)
- Pauline Horson (1858–1918)
- Marie Ismaël-Garcin (1858–1946)
- Pauline Mailhac (1858–1946)
- Marcella Sembrich (1858–1935)
- Nellie Stewart (1858–1931)
- Zaré Thalberg (1858–1915)
- Marie van Zandt (1858–1919)

1859

- Johanna André (1859–1926)
- Elvira Colonnese (1859–1949)
- Medea Figner (1859–1952)
- Emma Nevada (1859–1940)
- Ilka Pálmay (1859–1945)
- Carrie Pringle (1859–1930)
- Irma Reichová (1859–1930)
- Pauline Savari (1859–1907)
- Antonie Schläger (1859–1910)
- Pauline Schöller (1859–1941)
- Juliette Simon-Girard (1859–1954)
- Clara E. Thoms (1859–1941)

=== 1860s ===
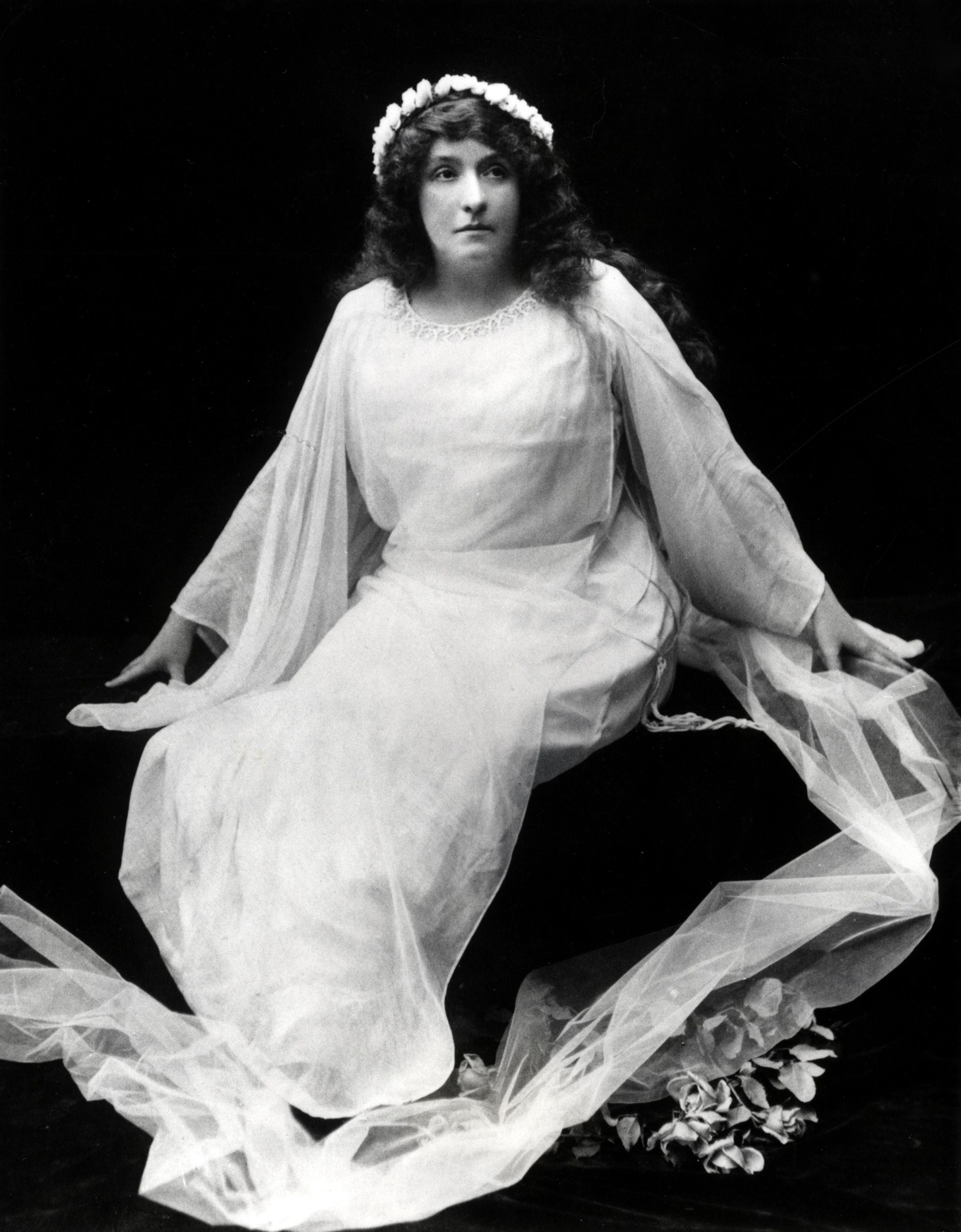
Nellie Melba

1860

- Vendela Andersson-Sörensen (1860–1926)
- Lola Beeth (1860–1940)
- Hariclea Darclée (1860–1939)
- Lillian Henschel (1860–1901)
- Emma Juch (1860–1939)
- Félia Litvinne (1860–1936)
- Koharik Şirinyan (born 1860)
- Agnes Stavenhagen (1860–1945)
- Adelina Stehle (1860–1945)

1861

- Adèle Almati (1861–1919)
- Teresa Arkel (1861–1929)
- Sigrid Arnoldson (1861–1943)
- Zélie de Lussan (1861–1949)
- Dora Henninges Heinsohn (1861–1900)
- Medora Henson (1861–1928)
- Vernona Jarbeau (1861–1914)
- Selma Kronold (1861–1920)
- Sadie Martinot (1861–1923)
- Nellie Melba (1861–1931)
- Amalia Paoli (c.1861–1941)

1862

- Dina Barberini (1862–1932)
- Concepció Bordalba (1862–1910)
- Laura Friedmann (1862–1893)
- Amélie Nikisch (1862–1938)
- Luise Reuss-Belce (1862–1945)
- Marguerite Ugalde (1862–1940)
- Geraldine Ulmar (1862–1932)

1863

- Pauline de Ahna (1863–1950)
- Ottilie Collin (1863–1960)
- Cesira Ferrani (1863–1943)
- Ellen Gulbranson (1863–1947)
- Louise Janssen (1863–1938)
- Charlotte Maconda (1863–1952)
- Cécile Simonnet (1863–1921)
- Milka Ternina (1863–1941)

1864

- Blanche Arral (1864–1945)
- Gemma Bellincioni (1864–1950)
- Jenny Broch (1864–?)
- Elisabeth Dons (1864–1942)
- Alice Esty (1864–1935)
- Chalía Herrera (1864–1948)
- Anna Maria Klemming (1864–1889)
- Elisabeth Leisinger (1864–1913)
- Marie Renard (1864–1939)
- Sibyl Sanderson (1864 –1903)
- Emma Zilli (1864–1901)

1865

- Emma Eames (1865–1952)
- Charlotte Huhn (1865–1925)
- Olga Islar (1865–1944)
- Marie Jahn (1865–1934)
- Johanna Loisinger (1865–1951)
- Rose Stelle-Pourtet (1865– after 1918)
- Olga von Türk-Rohn (1865–1940)
- Marion Weed (1865–1947)

1866

- Ellen Brandt-Forster (1866–1921)
- Nancy McIntosh (1866–1954)
- Fanny Moody (1866–1945)

1867

- Olimpia Boronat (1867–1933)
- Louise von Ehrenstein (1867–1944)
- Evangeline Florence (1867–1928)
- Mathilde Fröhlich (1867 –1934)
- Julie Kopacsy-Karczag (1867–1957)
- Ida Krzyzanowski-Doxat (1867–1947)
- Elise Kutscherra de Nyss (1867–1945)
- Marcella Lindh (1867–1966)
- Olena Muravyova (1867–1939)
- Hedevig Quiding (1867–1936)
- Georgina Stirling (1867–1935)
- Sophie Traubmann (1867–1951)
- Edyth Walker (1867–1950)

1868

- Mathilde Auguez (1868–1955)
- Marie Dietrich (1868–1939)
- Elin Fohström (1868–1949)
- Sissieretta Jones (1868 or 1869–1933)
- Jeanne Leclerc (1868–1914)
- Alice May Bates Rice (1868– after 1907)
- Sarah Robinson-Duff (1868–1934)
- Erika Wedekind (1868–1944)
- Marie Wittich (1868–1931)
- Nadezhda Zabela-Vrubel (1868–1913)

1869

- Anna Bartels (1869–1950)
- Lucienne Bréval (1869–1935)
- Susanne Dessoir (1869–1953)
- Berta Foersterová (1869–1936)
- Laura Hilgermann (1869–1945)
- Georgette Leblanc (1869–1941)
- Růžena Maturová (1869–1938)
- Dorothy Morton (1869–1939)
- Anna Müller-Lincke (1869–1935)
- Juliette Nesville (1869–1900)
- Regina Pinkert (1869–1931)
- Greta Williams (1869–1964)
- Ellen Beach Yaw (1869–1947)

=== 1870s ===
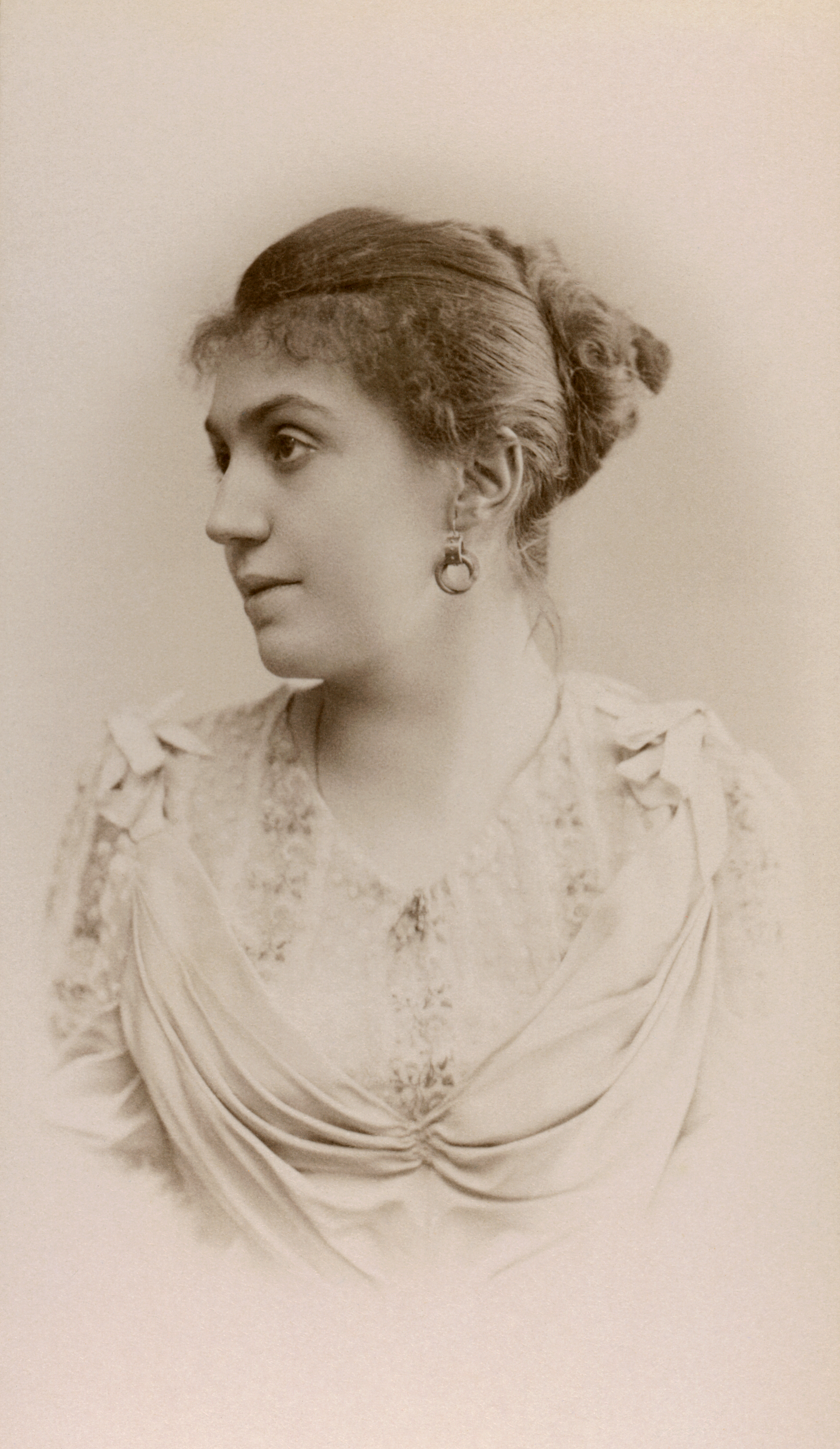
Fausta Labia

1870

- Riza Eibenschütz (1870–1946)
- Louise Grandjean (1870–1934)
- Mary Howe (1870–1952)
- Pauline Joran (1870–1954)
- Fausta Labia (1870–1935)
- Jeanne Laisné (born 1870)
- Marie Mattfeld (1870–1927)

1871

- Carmen Bonaplata (1871–1911)
- Avelina Carrera (1871–1939)
- Olive Fremstad (1871–1951)
- Giuseppina Huguet (1871–1951)
- Maikki Järnefelt (1871–1929)
- Decima Moore (1871–1964)
- Emmie Owen (1871–1905)
- Regina Pacini (1871–1965)
- Anna Sutter (1871–1910)
- Luisa Tetrazzini (1871–1940)
- Helene Wiet (1871–1939)

1872

- Irene Abendroth (1872–1932)
- Suzanne Adams (1872–1953)
- Maria Bossenberger (1872–1919)
- Eugenia Burzio (1872–1922)
- Alba Chrétien-Vaguet (1872–1963)
- Hermine Finck (1872–1932)
- Johanna Gadski (1872–1932)
- Lizete Iesmiņa-Mihelsone (1872–1934)
- Solomiya Krushelnytska (1872–1952)
- Anna von Mildenburg (1872–1947)
- Ida Møller (1872–1947)
- Alice Nielsen (1872–1943)
- Lina Pasini-Vitale (1872–1959)
- Marie Rappold (1872–1957)
- Rosina Storchio (1872–1945)
- Emilie Ulrich (1872–1952)

1873

- Lillian Blauvelt (1873–1947)
- Virginia Galván de Nava (1873–195?)
- Jane Osborn Hannah (1873–1943)
- Bernice de Pasquali (1873–1925)
- Margrethe Lendrop (1873–1920)
- Antonina Nezhdanova (1873–1950)
- Giannina Russ (1873–1951)
- Grace Van Studdiford (1873–1927)
- Alice Verlet (1873–1934)
- Ruth Vincent (1873–1955)

1874

- Johanne Brun (1874–1954)
- Lina Cavalieri (1874–1944)
- Melva Clemaire (1874–1937)
- Marcella Craft (1874–1959)
- Mary Garden (1874–1967)
- Marie Gutheil-Schoder (1874–1935)
- Ingeborg Nørregaard Hansen (1874–1941)
- Selma Kurz (1874–1933)
- Magna Lykseth-Skogman (1874–1949)
- Lalla Miranda (1874–1944)
- Minnie Nast (1874–1956)
- Fanchette Verhunc (1874–1944)

1875

- Hermine Bosetti (1875–1936)
- María Galvany (1875–1927)
- Mai Kalna (1875–1934)
- Janina Korolewicz-Waydowa (1875–1955)
- Violet Mount (1875–1972)
- Anna Oscàr (1875–1915)
- Camilla Pasini (1875–1935)

1876

- Aino Ackté (1876–1944)
- Lola Artôt de Padilla (1876–1933)
- Zina Brozia (1876–1958)
- Mary Carson (1876–1951)
- Marcelle Demougeot (1876–1931)
- Adine Fafard-Drolet (1876–1963)
- Marya Freund (1876–1966)
- Mary Hagen (1876–1944)
- Lucette Korsoff (1876–1955)
- Annie Krull (1876–1947)
- Hilda Moody (1876–1961)
- Agnes Nicholls (1876–1959)
- Amelia Pinto (1876–1946)
- Carrie Tubb (1876–1976)
- Lucie Weidt (1876–1940)
- Mizzi Zwerenz (1876–1947)

1877

- Bella Alten (1877–1962)
- Celestina Boninsegna (1877–1947)
- Emma Carelli (1877–1928)
- Davida Hesse-Lilienberg (1877–1964)
- Marcia Van Dresser (1877–1937)
- Emma Vecla (1877–1972)

1878

- Bessie Abott (1878–1919)
- Emmy Destinn (1878–1930)
- Jenny Dufau (1878–1924)
- Maude Fay (1878–1964)
- Rose Féart (1878–1954)
- Giuseppina Finzi-Magrini (1878–1944)
- Rita Fornia (1878–1922)
- Grete Forst (1878–1942)
- Rosa Grünberg (1878–1960)
- Béatrice La Palme (1878–1921)
- Lucy Isabelle Marsh (1878–1956)
- Berta Morena (1878–1952)
- Ida Salden (born 1878)
- Emma Trentini (1878–1959)
- Ella Tvrdková (1878–1918)

1879

- Lina Abarbanell (1879–1963)
- Frances Alda (1879–1952)
- Marguerite Bériza (1879–1970)
- Hedy Iracema-Brügelmann (1879–1941)
- Suzanne Cesbron-Viseur (1879–1967)
- Vera Curtis (1879 or 1880–1962)
- Zdenka Faßbender (1879–1954)
- Edmée Favart (1879–1941)
- Irene von Fladung (1879–1965)
- Mizzi Günther (1879–1961)
- Alice Guszalewicz (1879–1940)
- Isabel Jay (1879–1927)
- Karola Jovanović (1879–1958)
- Melanie Kurt (1879–1941)
- Vera Nimidoff (1879–1963)
- Signe Rappe-Welden (1879–1974)
- Margarethe Siems (1879–1952)
- Elsie Spain (1879–1970)

=== 1880s ===
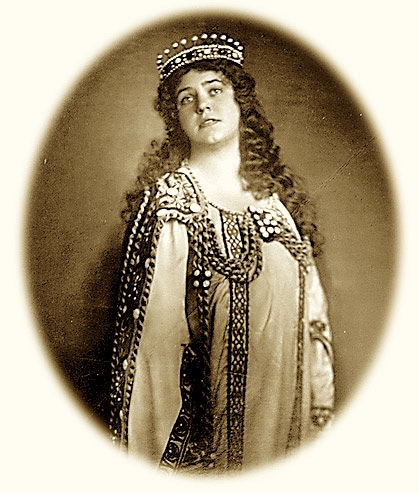
Lotte Lehmann

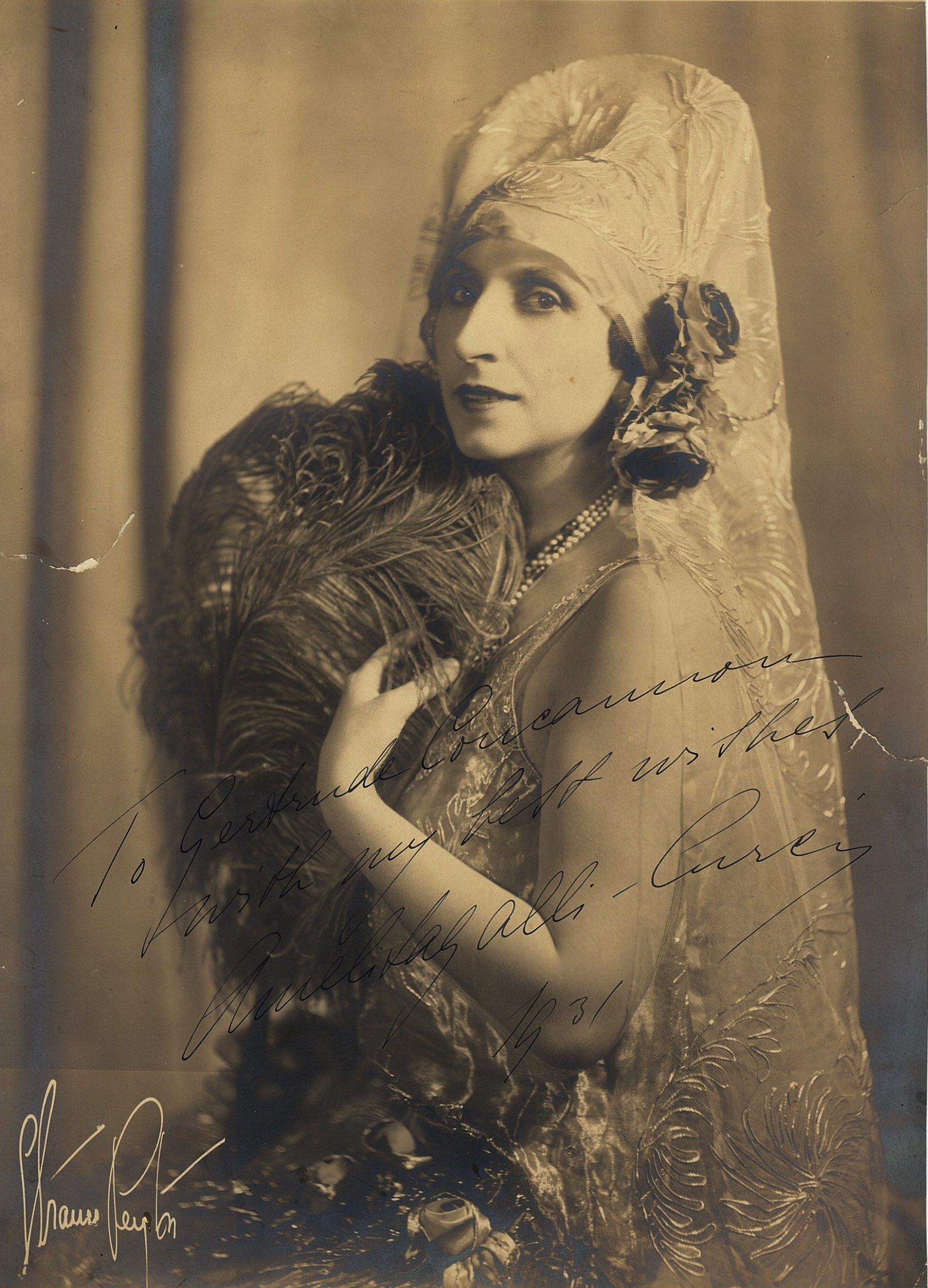
Amelita Galli-Curci

1880

- Elsa Alsen (1880–1975)
- Marguerite Carré (1880–1947)
- Amy Eliza Castles (1880–1951)
- Gertrude Förstel (1880–1950)
- Gabrielle Gills (born 1880)
- Božena Kacerovská (1880–1970)
- Maria Labia (1880–1953)
- Estelle Liebling (1880–1970)
- Ilona Szoyer (1880–1956)
- May Peterson Thompson (1880–1952)
- Martha Winternitz-Dorda (1880–1958)

1881

- Mariska Aldrich (1881–1965)
- Elizabeth Amsden (1881–1966)
- Minna Beckmann-Tube (1881–1964)
- Rosina Buckman (1881–1948)
- Marthe Chenal (1881–1947)
- Erna Denera (1881–1938)
- Yvonne Dubel (1881–1958)
- Natalia Ermolenko-Yuzhina (1881–1937)
- Povla Frijsh (1881–1960)
- Barbara Kemp (1881–1959)
- Margaret Matzenauer (1881–1963)
- Eva von der Osten (1881–1936)
- Bella Paalen (1881–1964)
- Elsa Stralia (1881–1945)
- Marie Tiffany (1881–1948)
- Yvonne de Tréville (1881–1954)
- Anna Kriebel Vanzo (1881–1926)

1882

- Emma Lucy Gates Bowen (1882–1951)
- Eugenia Bronskaya (1882–1953)
- Pauline Donalda (1882–1970)
- Florence Easton (1882–1955)
- Birgit Engell (1882–1973)
- Geraldine Farrar (1882–1967)
- Ines Maria Ferraris (1882–1971)
- Amelita Galli-Curci (1882–1963)
- Mary Kaestner (born 1882)
- Lydia Lipkowska (1882–1958)
- Fritzi Massary (1882–1969)
- Maria Moscisca (1882–1971)
- Vali von der Osten (1882–1923)
- Adelaide von Skilondz (1882–1969)
- Marie Sundelius (1882–1958)
- Tarquinia Tarquini (1882–1976)
- Helene Wildbrunn (1882–1972)

1883

- Else Gentner-Fischer (1883–1943)
- Caroline Hatchard (1883–1970)
- Agnes Hvoslef (1883–1970)
- Borghild Langaard (1883–1939)
- Ester Mazzoleni (1883–1982)
- Frances Peralta (1883–1933)

1884

- Maria Barrientos (1884–1946)
- Amy Evans (1884–1983)
- Helena Forti (1884–1942)
- Hanna Granfelt (1884–1952)
- Alma Gluck (1884–1938)
- Lilly Hafgren (1884–1965)
- Gertrud Kappel (1884–1971)
- Nanny Larsén-Todsen (1884–1942)
- Lydia Locke (1884–1966)
- Nelly Martyl (1884–1953)
- Abbie Mitchell (1884–1960)
- Tamaki Miura (1884–1946)
- Eidé Norena (1884–1968)
- Eugenie Sendrey (1884–1959)
- Luisa Villani (1884–1961)

1885

- Enrica Clay Dillon (1885–1946)
- Claire Dux (1885–1967)
- Erna Ellmenreich (1885–1976)
- Alice Eversman (1885–1974)
- Ester Ferrabini (1885–1984)
- Yvonne Gall (1885–1972)
- Frieda Hempel (1885–1955)
- Alice D'Hermanoy (1885– after 1932)
- Florence Hinkle (1885–1933)
- Tenna Kraft (1885–1954)
- Odette Le Fontenay (1885–1965)
- Miriam Licette (1885–1969)
- Alys Lorraine (1885–1956)
- Carmen Melis (1885–1967)
- Denise Orme (1885–1960)
- Eleanor Painter Strong (1885–1947)
- Therese Wiet (1885–1971)
- Alice Zeppilli (1885–1969)

1886

- Wanda Achsel (1886–1977)
- Martha Atwood (1886–1950)
- Beatrice Gjertsen Bessesen (1886–1935)
- Ina Bourskaya (1886–1954)
- Bertha May Crawford (1886–1937)
- Mabel Garrison (1886–1963)
- Louise Kartousch (1886–1964)
- Emmy Krüger (1886–1976)
- Albertine Morin-Labrecque (1886–1957)
- Mignon Nevada (1886–1971)
- Mabel Riegelman (1886–1967)
- Gabrielle Ritter-Ciampi (1886–1974)
- Mafalda Salvatini (1886–1971)
- Ada Sari (1886–1968)
- Edvige Vaccari (1886–1974)
- Ninon Vallin (1886–1961)
- Carolina White (1886–1961)

1887

- Margherita Bevignani (1887–1921)
- Lucrezia Bori (1887–1960)
- Anna Case (1887–1984)
- Sofia Charlebois (1887–1948)
- Consuelo Escobar (1887–1967)
- Anna Fitziu (1887–1967)
- Antoinette Garnes (c.1887–1938)
- Clytie Hine (1887–1983)
- Maria Jeritza (1887–1982)
- Isa Kremer (1887–1956)
- Bessie Jones (1887–1974)
- Lilly Lamprecht (1887–1976)
- Felice Lyne (1887–1935)
- Germaine Martinelli (1887–1964)
- Christina Morfova (1887–1936)
- Olga Simzis (born 1887)
- Cobina Wright (1887–1970)

1888

- Suzanne Balguerie (1888–1973)
- Adalgisa Giana (1888–1970)
- Johanna Geisler (1888–1956)
- Fanny Heldy (1888–1973)
- Florence Kimball (1888–1977)
- Lotte Lehmann (1888–1976)
- Frida Leider (1888–1975)
- Marguerite Namara (1888–1974)
- Evelyn Parnell (1888–1939)
- Elisabeth Schumann (1888–1952)
- Vera Schwarz (1888–1964)
- Oda Slobodskaya (1888–1970)
- Maggie Teyte (1888–1976)

1889

- Valentina Bartolomasi (1889–1932)
- Yvonne Brothier (1889–1967)
- Florence Macbeth (1889–1966)
- Mary McCormic (1889–1981)
- Claudia Muzio (1889–1936)
- Graziella Pareto (1889–1973)

=== 1890s ===
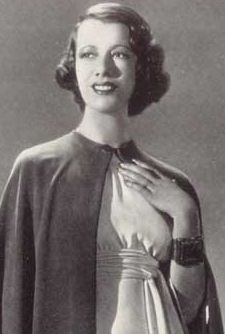
Lily Pons

1890

- Ruth Althén (1890–1985)
- Xenia Belmas (1890–1981)
- Gemma Bosini (1890–1982)
- Lillian Evanti (1890–1967)
- Alma Francis (1890–1968)
- Maria Gerhart (1890–1975)
- Germaine Lubin (1890–1979)
- Marianne Mathy (1890–1978)
- Mary Mellish (1890–1955)
- Ululani McQuaid (1890–1970)
- Ada Navarrete (1890–1967)
- Ida Quaiatti (1890–1962)
- Hina Spani (1890–1969)
- Florence Cole Talbert (1890–1961)
- Stanisława Zawadzka (1890–1988)

1891

- Zola Amaro (1891–1944)
- Giannina Arangi-Lombardi (1891–1951)
- Elvira de Hidalgo (1891–1980)
- Felicie Hüni-Mihacsek (1891–1976)
- Maria Ivogün (1891–1987)
- María Ros (1891–1970)
- Mathilde Saïman (1891–1940)
- Lotte Schöne (1891–1977)
- Liesel Schuch-Ganzel (1891–1990)

1892

- Florence Austral (1892–1968)
- Valeria Barsova (1892–1967)
- Santa Biondo (1892–1989)
- Margherita Grandi (1892–1972)
- Zinaida Jurjewskaja (1892–1925)
- Aga Lahowska (1892–1962)
- Winifred Lawson (1892–1961)
- Maria Litvinenko-Volgemut (1892–1966)
- Emma Luart (1892–1968)
- Dorothee Manski (1892–1967)
- Edith Mason (1892–1973)
- Gladys Moncrieff (1892–1976)
- Delia Reinhardt (1892–1974)
- Gilda dalla Rizza (1892–1975)
- Lisa Roma (1892–1965)
- Eva Turner (1892–1990)

1893

- Rita Bell (1893–1992)
- Toti Dal Monte (1893–1975)
- Haykanoush Danielyan (1893–1958)
- Amparito Farrar (1893–1989)
- Göta Ljungberg (1893–1955)
- Josephine Lucchese (1893–1974)
- Rena Pfiffer-Lax (1893–1943)
- Maria Montana (1893–1971)
- Rosa Raisa (1893–1963)
- Anne Roselle (1893–1989)
- Myrna Sharlow (1893–1952)

1894

- Ewa Bandrowska-Turska (1894–1979)
- Gertrude Johnson (1894–1973)
- Luba Mirella (1894–1972)
- Rose Pauly (1894–1975)
- Yvonne Printemps (1894–1977)
- Elisabeth Rethberg (1894–1976)
- Bianca Scacciati (1894–1948)
- Viorica Ursuleac (1894–1985)

1895

- Margit Angerer (1895–1978)
- Olga Averino (1895–1989)
- Isobel Baillie (1895–1983)
- Emmy Bettendorf (1895–1963)
- Ayres Borghi-Zerni (born 1895)
- Kirsten Flagstad (1895–1962)
- Manet Harrison Fowler (1895–1976)
- Elsie Griffin (1895–1989)
- Fritzi Jokl (1895–1974)
- Mercedes Llopart (1895–1970)
- Ángeles Ottein (1895–1981)
- Hildegard Ranczak (1895–1987)
- Soffi Schønning (1895–1994)
- Else Schøtt (1895–1989)
- Meta Seinemeyer (1895–1929)
- Madeleine Sibille (1895–1984)
- Anny von Stosch (1895–1994)
- Grete Stückgold (1895–1977)
- Maria Zamboni (1895–1976)

1896

- Clara Clairbert (1896–1970)
- Eva Didur (born 1896)
- Sarah Fischer (1896–1975)
- Queena Mario (1896–1951)
- Rosetta Pampanini (1896–1973)
- Evelyn Scotney (1896–1967)
- Ebba Wilton (1896–1951)

1897

- Conchita Badía (1897–1975)
- Mercedes Capsir (1897–1969)
- Roberta Dodd Crawford (1897–1954)
- Alexandra Čvanová (1897–1939)
- Mary Ellis (1897–2003)
- Käthe Heidersbach (1897–1979)
- Tiana Lemnitz (1897–1994)
- Shovkat Mammadova (1897–1981)
- Rina Massardi (1897–1979)
- Maria Nemeth (1897–1967)
- Rosa Ponselle (1897–1981)
- Virginia Rea (1897–1941)

1898

- Margarete Bäumer (1898–1969)
- Irma Björck (1898–1993)
- Claire Born (1898–1965)
- Sylvia Cecil (c. 1898– c. 1983)
- Giuseppina Cobelli (1898–1948)
- Edytha Fleischer (1898–1957)
- Moje Forbach (1898–1933)
- Marta Fuchs (1898–1974)
- Ria Ginster (1898–1945)
- Clara Jacobo (c.1898–1966)
- Caterina Jarboro (1898–1986)
- Grace Moore (1898–1947)
- Maria Müller (1898–1958)
- Iva Pacetti (1898–1981)
- Lily Pons (1898–1976)
- La Julia Rhea (1898–1992)
- Erna Sack (1898–1972)
- Rosalind von Schirach (1898–1981)
- Emy von Stetten (1898–1980)
- Jean Tennyson (1898–1991)
- Jo Vincent (1898–1989)

1899

- Signe Amundsen (1899–1987)
- Helen Traubel (1899–1972)
- Irena Turkevycz-Martynec (1899–1983)

== Born in the 20th century ==
=== 1900s ===
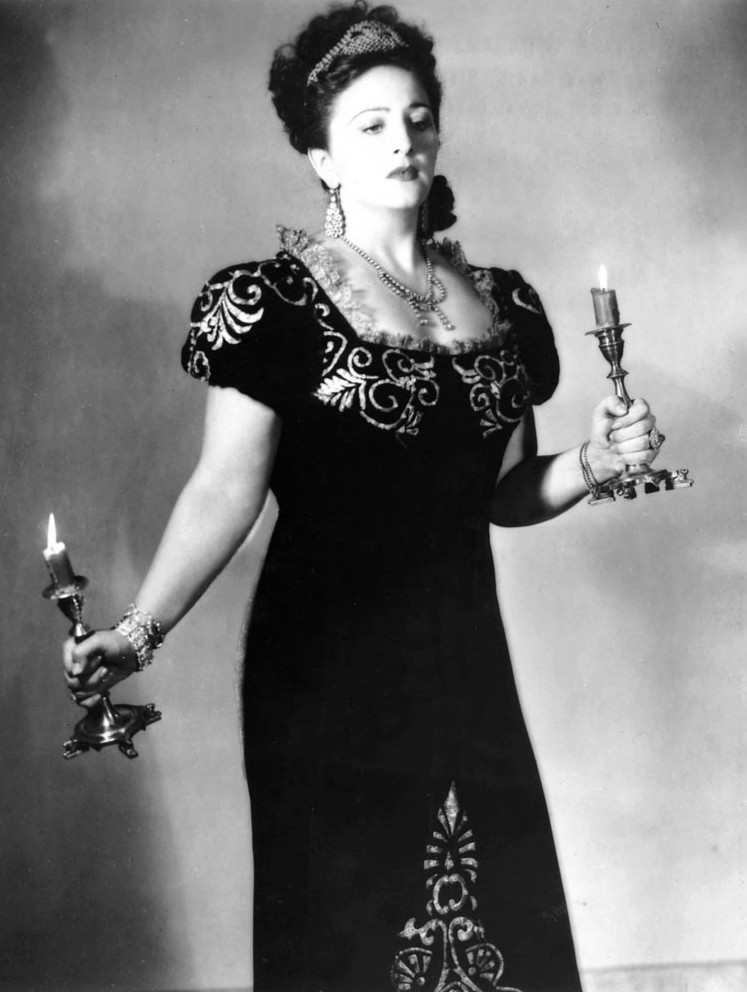
Zinka Milanov

Gina Cigna

1900

- Erna Berger (1900–1990)
- Margit Bokor (1900 or 1903–1949)
- Mary Bothwell (1900- died mid 1970s)
- Vina Bovy (1900–1983)
- Marcelle Bunlet (1900–1991)
- Josepha Chekova (1900–1968)
- Gina Cigna (1900–2001)
- Joan Cross (1900–1993)
- Mary Ellis (1900–2003)
- Anni Frind (1900–1987)
- Helga Görlin (1900–1993)
- Evelyn Laye (1900–1996)
- Mary Lewis (1900–1941)
- Audrey Mildmay (1900–1953)
- Wanda Wermińska (1900–1988)

1901

- Anna Báthy (1901–1962)
- Noël Eadie (1901–1950)
- Luise Helletsgruber (1901–1967)
- Irene Jessner (1901–1994)
- Adele Kern (1901–1980)
- Franca Somigli (1901–1974)
- Ida Loo-Talvari (1901–1997)
- Muriel Wilson (1901–1969)

1902

- Beatrice Belkin (1902–1998)
- Colette D'Arville (1902–1944)
- Clara Ebers (1902–1997)
- Sybil Gordon (1902–1981)
- Zoia Gaidai (1902–1965)
- Dusolina Giannini (1902–1986)
- Hedwig Hillengaß (1902–1970)
- Anny Konetzni (1902–1968))
- Rosl Landwehr (1902–1981)
- Bidu Sayão (1902–1999)
- Maria Sokil (1902–1999)
- Alice Tully (1902–1993)
- Hatsue Yuasa (1902– after 1943)

1903

- Gitta Alpár (1903–1991)
- Helena Braun (1903–1990)
- Muriel Dickson (1903–1990)
- Irene Eisinger (1903–1994)
- Mafalda Favero (1903–1981)
- Marie-Thérèse Gauley (1903–1992)
- Nanette Guilford (1903–1990)
- Anny Helm (1903–1993)
- Frances James (1903–1988)
- Jeanette MacDonald (1903–1965)
- Verna Osborne (1903–2006)
- Noémie Pérugia (1903–1992)
- Maria Reining (1903–1991)
- Margaret Ritchie (1903–1969)
- Ina Souez (1903–1992)
- Pia Tassinari (1903–1995)
- Margarete Teschemacher (1903–1959)
- Geneviève Touraine (1903–1982)
- Sim Viva (1903–1982)

1904

- İclal Ar (1904–2007)
- Irma Beilke (1904–1989)
- Iris Adami Corradetti (1904–1998)
- Margarethe Düren (1904– c.1988)
- Sybil Evers (1904–1963)
- Karen-Marie Flagstad (1904–1992)
- Lillie Grandval (1904–2000)
- Bahrija Nuri Hadžić (1904–1993)
- Else-Marie Hansen (1904–2003)
- Helen Jepson (1904–1997)
- Stella Roman (1904–1992)
- Joan Ruth (c.1904– after 1944)
- Erna Schlüter (1904–1969)

1905

- Maria Caniglia (1905–1979)
- Lillie Claus (1905–2000)
- Germaine Hoerner (1905–1972)
- Hilde Konetzni (1905–1980)
- Maria Madlen Madsen (1905–1990)
- Rosario García Orellana (1905–1997)
- Isa Quensel (1905–1981)

1906

- Gwen Catley (1906–1996)
- Margaret Daum (1906–1977)
- Judith Hellwig (1906–1993)
- Annelies Kupper (1906–1987)
- Jeanette Loff (1906–1942)
- Zinka Milanov (1906–1989)
- Tessie Mobley (1906–1990)
- Lucy Monroe (1906–1987)
- Grete Natzler (1906–1999)
- Aulikki Rautawaara (1906–1990)
- Sara Scuderi (1906–1987)
- Maxine Stellman (1906–1972)
- Marion Talley (1906–1983)

1907

- Martha Angelici (1907–1973)
- Josephine Antoine (1907–1971)
- Rose Bampton (1907–2007)
- Lina Bruna Rasa (1907–1984)
- Winifred Cecil (1907–1985)
- Nadine Conner (1907–2003)
- Ellabelle Davis (1907–1960)
- Annunciata Garrotto (1907–1998)
- Adriana Guerrini (1907–1970)
- Marjorie Lawrence (1907–1979)
- Jarmila Novotná (1907–1994)
- Lina Pagliughi (1907–1980)
- Grace Panvini (1907–1999)
- Hilde Scheppan (1907–1970)
- Eva Siewert (1907–1994)

1908

- Mascha Benya (1908–2007)
- Natalie Bodanya (1908–2007)
- Maria Carbone (1908–2002)
- Margherita Carosio (1908–2005)
- Ludmila Červinková (1908–1980)
- Trude Eipperle (1908–1997)
- Ruby Elzy (1908–1943)
- Gabriella Gatti (1908–2003)
- Aenne Michalsky (1908–1986)
- Margherita Perras (1908–1984)
- Nunù Sanchioni (born 1908)
- Inez Silberg (1908–1985)
- Walburga Wegner (1908–1993)

1909

- Licia Albanese (1909–2014)
- Selma Amansky (1909–1987)
- Sylvia Gähwiller (1909–1999)
- Margaret Harshaw (1909–1997)
- Florence Kirk (1909–1999)
- Miliza Korjus (c.1909–1980)
- Tatiana Menotti (1909–2001)
- Herva Nelli (1909–1994)
- Marie Podvalová (1909–1992)
- Hjördis Schymberg (1909–2008)
- Natalia Shpiller (1909–1995)
- Randi Heide Steen (1909–1990)
- Barbara Thorne Stevenson (1909–1985)
- Nada Tončić (1909–1998)
- Francia White (1909–1984)

=== 1910s ===
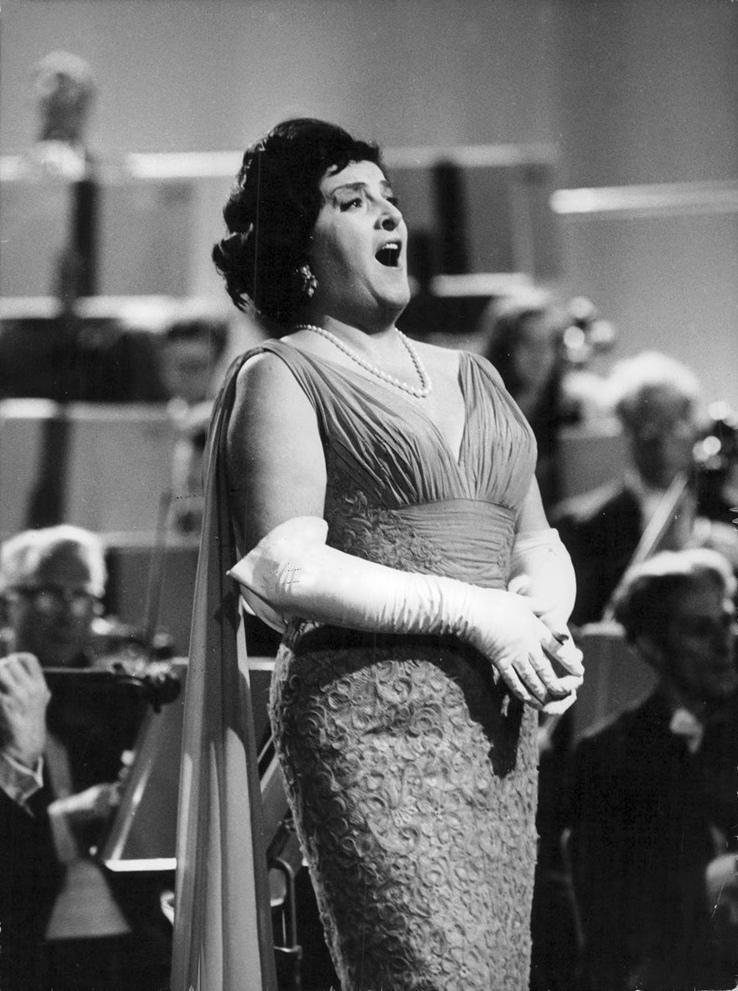
Birgit-Nilsson

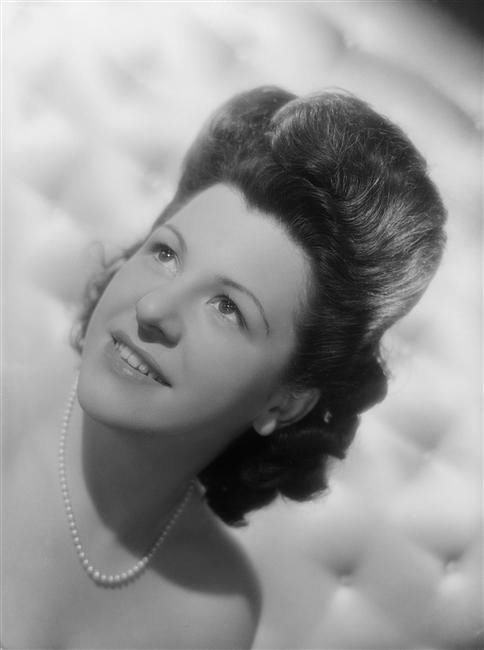
Mado Robin

1910

- Anna-Lisa Björling (1910–2006)
- Rosemarie Brancato (1910–1994)
- Maria Cebotari (1910–1949)
- Sylvia Fisher (1910–1996)
- Margot Guilleaume (1910–2004)
- Dorothy Kirsten (1910–1992)
- Mercedes Matias-Santiago (1910–2003)
- Magda Olivero (1910–2014)
- Ruth Packer (1910–2005)
- Giulietta Simionato (1910–2010)
- Tefta Tashko-Koço (1910–1947)

1911

- Lucia Bercescu-Țurcanu (1911–1995)
- Maud Cunitz (1911–1987)
- Suzanne Danco (1911–2000)
- Annamary Dickey (1911–1999)
- Suzy Frelinghuysen (1911–1988)
- Elisabeth Grümmer (1911–1986)
- Dorothy Larsen (1911–1990)
- Christine McIntyre (1911–1984)
- Zdenka Rubinstein (1911–1961)
- Tresi Rudolph (1911–1997)
- Carla Spletter (1911–1953)
- Maria Stader (1911–1999)
- Maria Tauberová (1911–2003)

1912

- Fedora Alemán (1912–2018)
- Joan Alexander (1912–2010)
- Kulyash Baiseitova (1912–1957)
- Anne Brown (1912–2009)
- Christel Goltz (1912–2008)
- Dési von Halban (1912–1996)
- Joan Hammond (1912–1996)
- Emelie Hooke (1912–1974)
- Marina Koshetz (1912–2000)
- Audrey Langford (1912–1994)
- Magda László (1912–2002)
- Eleanor Lausch (1912–2001)
- Virginia MacWatters (1912–2005)
- Martha Mödl (1912–2001)
- Edith Oldrup (1912–1999)
- Magda Piccarolo (born 1912)
- Mascia Predit (1912–2001)
- Nadine Renaux (1912–2005)
- Esther Réthy (1912–2004)
- Helen Roberts (1912–2010)
- Rosita Serrano (1912–1997)
- Keturah Sorrell (1912–2012)
- Ilona Steingruber (1912–1962)

1913

- Esther Borja (1913–2013)
- Carla Gavazzi (1913–2008)
- Irène Joachim (1913–2001)
- Berthe Kal (1913–2015)
- Loulie Jean Norman (1913–2005)
- Halima Nosirova (1913–2003)
- Elfriede Trötschel (1913–1958)
- Ljuba Welitsch (1913–1996)
- Frances Yeend (1913–2008)

1914

- Sári Barabás (1914–2012)
- Rose Hill (1914–2003)
- Dora Komar (1914–2006)
- Emmy Loose (1914–1987)
- Janine Micheau (1914–1976)
- Clara Petrella (1914–1987)
- Dorothy Sarnoff (1914–2008)
- Marianne Schech (1914–1999)
- Gretl Schörg (1914–2006)
- Graciela Silvain (1914–2006)
- Eleanor Steber (1914–1990)

1915

- Gré Brouwenstijn (1915–1999)
- Vivian Della Chiesa (1915–2009)
- Elen Dosia (1915–2002)
- Mária Gyurkovics (1915–1973)
- Gladys Kuchta (1915–1998)
- Gerda Lammers (1915–1993)
- Jane Lawrence (1915–2005)
- Carolyn Long (1915–1991)
- Elisabeth Schwarzkopf (1915–2006)
- Maria Zhorella Fedorova (1915–2017)

1916

- Helen Boatwright (1916–2010)
- Adriana Caselotti (1916–1997)
- Irma González (1916–2008)
- Virginia Herrick (1916–2016)
- Brenda Miller Cooper (1916–2008)
- Alda Noni (1916–2011)
- Rayén Quitral (1916–1979)
- Anne Sharp (1916–2011)
- Ruth Stewart (1916–2018)

1917

- Helena Bliss (1917–2014)
- Tuhfa Fozilova (1917–1984)
- Frances Greer (1917–2005)
- Marina Gordon (1917–2013)
- Gertrude Grob-Prandl (1917–1995)
- Hilde Güden (1917–1988)
- Mary LeSawyer (1917–2004)
- Eva Prytz (1917–1987)
- Hilde Zadek (1917–2019)

1918

- Ann Ayars (1918–1995)
- Mimi Benzell (1918 –1970)
- Ruthilde Boesch (1918–2012)
- Géori Boué (1918–2017)
- Mesude Çağlayan (1918–2011)
- Ellen Faull (1918–2008)
- Danka Firfova (1918–2003)
- Birgit Nilsson (1918–2005)
- Mado Robin (1918–1960)
- Rosl Schwaiger (1918–1970)
- Astrid Varnay (1918–2006)
- June Winters (1918–2015)

1919

- Lisa Della Casa (1919–2012)
- Philine Fischer (1919–2001)
- Ruth Guldbæk (1919–2006)
- Irene Jordan (1919–2016)
- Eva Likova (1919–2004)
- Patricia Neway (1919–2012)
- Lisa Otto (1919–2013)
- Helen Phillips (1919–2005)
- Irmgard Seefried (1919–1988)
- Camilla Williams (1919–2012)

=== 1920s ===
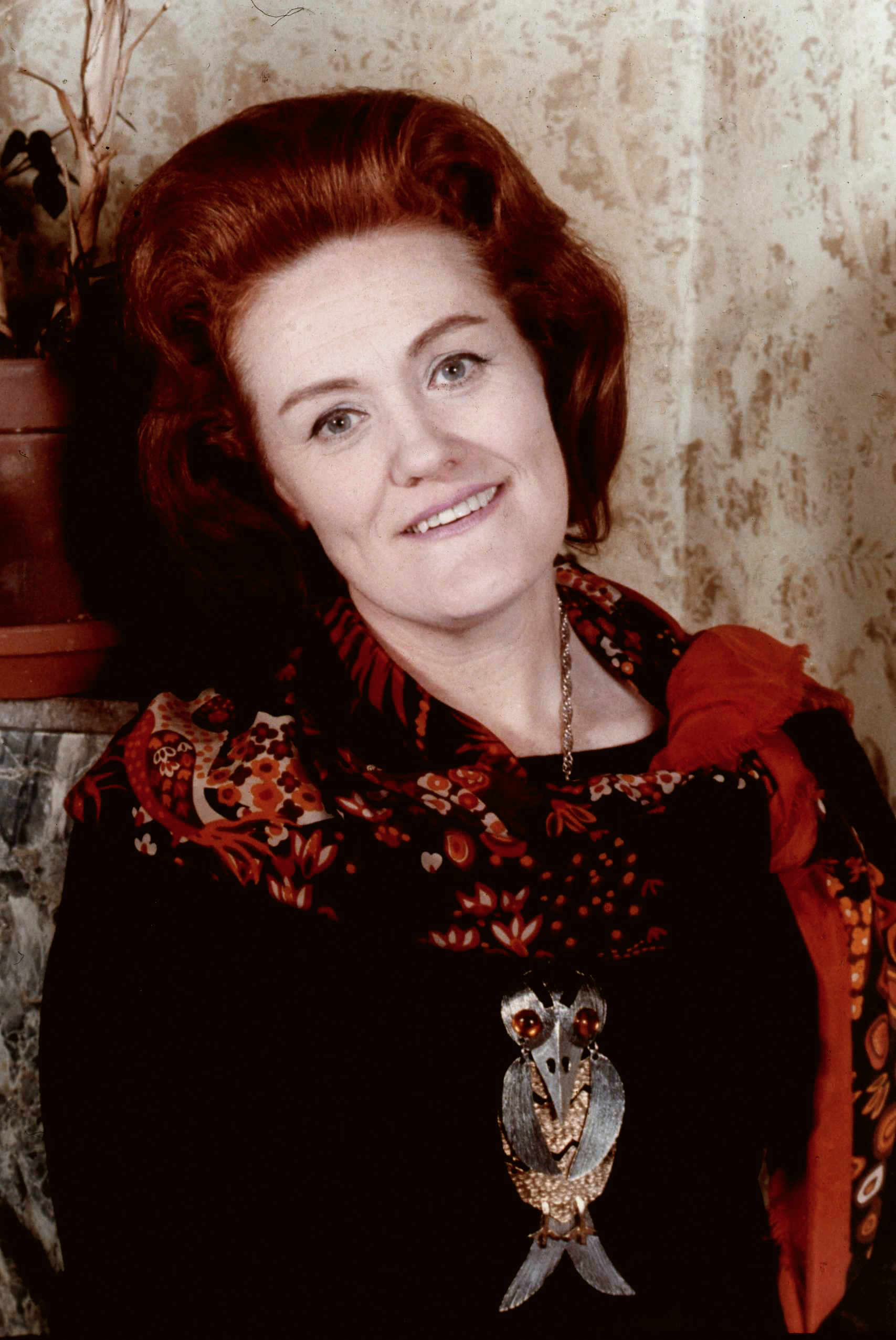
Joan Sutherland

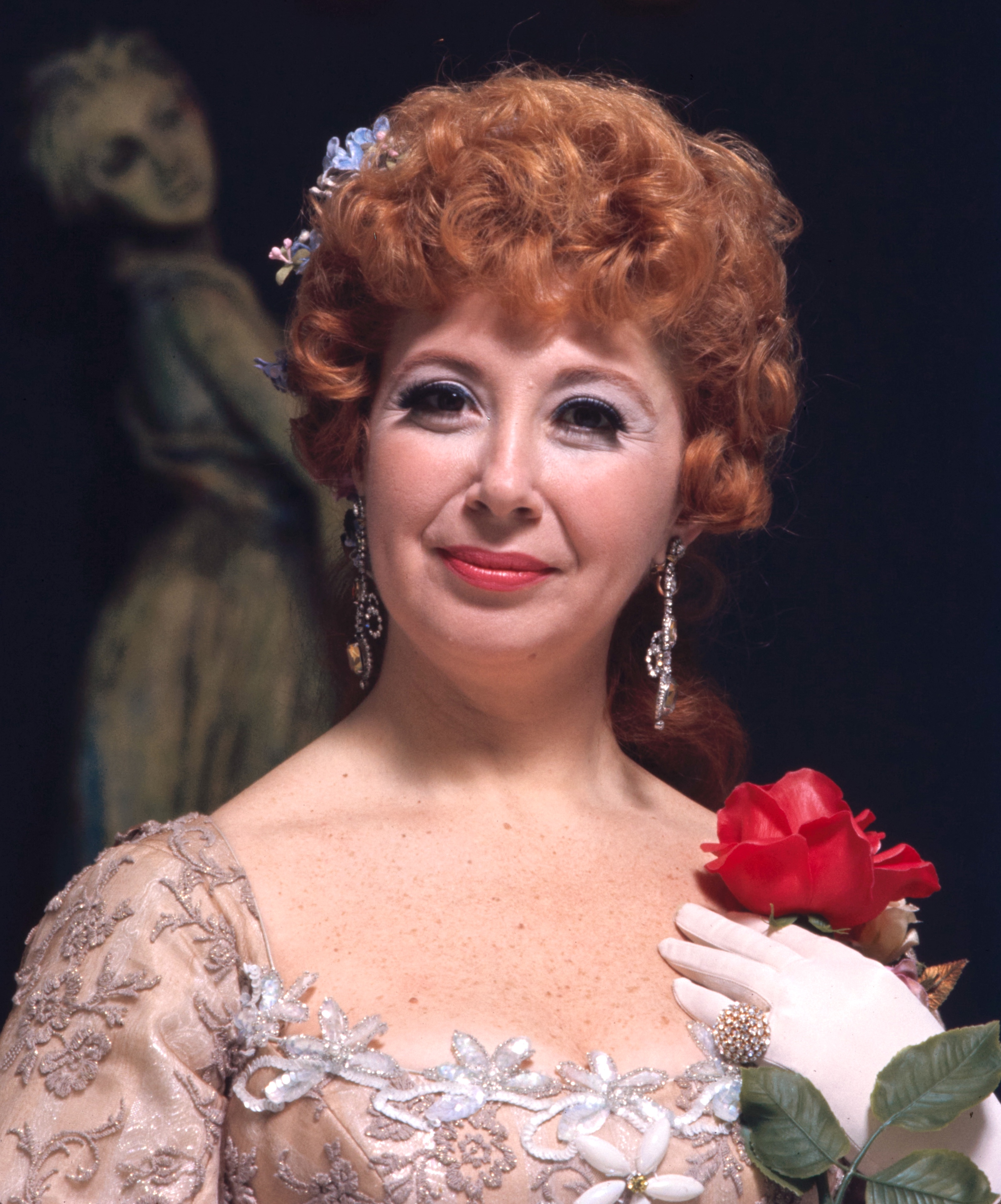
Beverly Sills

1920

- Olivia Bonelli (1920–1990)
- Dorothy Dow (1920–2005)
- Eileen Farrell (1920–2002)
- Elizabeth Fretwell (1920–2006)
- Maýa Gulyýewa (1920–2018)
- Suzanne Juyol (1920–1994)
- Marguerite Piazza (1920–2012)
- Delia Rigal (1920–2013)
- Rita Streich (1920–1987)

1921

- Pierrette Alarie (1921–2011)
- Elisabetta Barbato (1921–2014)
- Dorothy Bond (c. 1921–1952)
- Inge Borkh (1921–2018)
- Jacqueline Brumaire (1921–2000)
- Phyllis Curtin (1921–2016)
- Renée Doria (1921–2021)
- Denise Duval (1921–2016)
- Sena Jurinac (1921–2011)
- Brenda Lewis (1921–2017)
- Marcella Pobbe (1921–2003)
- Graciela Rivera (1921–2011)
- Mary Curtis Verna (1921–2009)
- Clementine von Schuch (1921–2014)
- Dorothy Warenskjold (1921–2010)

1922

- Elisabeth Carron (1922–2016)
- Lina Dachary (1922–1999)
- Kari Frisell (1922–2022)
- Kathryn Grayson (1922–2010)
- Una Hale (1922–2005)
- Ilse Hollweg (1922–1990)
- Charlotte Wesley Holloman (1922–2015)
- Carla Martinis (1922–2010)
- Glenda Raymond (1922–2003)
- Regina Resnik (1922–2013)
- Liane Synek (1922–1982)
- Renata Tebaldi (1922–2004)
- Lore Wissmann (1922–2007)
- Rae Woodland (1922–2013)
- Stefania Woytowicz (1922–2005)

1923

- Victoria de los Ángeles (1923–2005)
- Maria Callas (1923–1977)
- Ludmila Dvořáková (1923–2015)
- Shirlee Emmons (1923–2010)
- Saramae Endich (1923–1969)
- Gigliola Frazzoni (1923–2016)
- Barbara Howitt (1923–2011)
- Lucienne Jourfier (1923–2017)
- Iris Kells (1923–2016)
- Lucy Kelston (1923–2010)
- Elisabeth Lindermeier (1923–1998)
- Colette Lorand (1923–2019)
- Aase Nordmo Løvberg (1923–2013)
- Yolanda Marculescu (1923–1992)
- Stanislava Součková (1923–1997)
- Marlise Wendels (1923–2012)

1924

- Helena Arizmendi (1924 or 1927–2015)
- Liliane Berton (1924–2009)
- Marilyn Cotlow (1924–2024)
- Libuše Domanínská (1924–2021)
- Maaria Eira (1924–1999)
- Anny Felbermayer (1924–2014)
- Gohar Gasparyan (1924–2007)
- Lois Hunt (1924–2009)
- Caterina Mancini (1924–2011)
- Hanifa Mavlianova (1924–2010)
- Anne McKnight (1924–2012)
- Elsie Morison (1924–2016)
- Marta Pérez (1924–2009)
- Anneliese Rothenberger (1924–2010)
- Louise Roy (1924–1985)
- Lotte Rysanek (1924–2016)
- Amy Shuard (1924–1975)
- Milada Šubrtová (1924–2011)
- Helen Vanni (1924–2023)
- Christa Maria Ziese (1924–2012)

1925

- Adele Addison (born 1925)
- Lucine Amara (1925–2024)
- Bethany Beardslee (born 1925)
- Beverly Bower (1925–2002)
- Kjerstin Dellert (1925–2018)
- Mattiwilda Dobbs (1925–2015)
- Franca Duval (1925–2020)
- Maria di Gerlando (1925–2010)
- Hildegard Hillebrecht (1925–2018)
- Lucille Kailer (1925–2011)
- Erika Köth (1925–1989)
- Hanne-Lore Kuhse (1925–1999)
- Wilma Lipp (1925–2019)
- Liselotte Maikl (1925–2014)
- Lois Marshall (1925–1997)
- Patrice Munsel (1925–2016)
- Tamara Nizhnikova (1925–2018)
- Helga Pilarczyk (1925–2011)
- Claudia Pinza Bozzolla (1925–2017)
- Margherita Roberti (1925–2021)
- Aino Seep (1925–1982)
- Jane Stuart Smith (1925–2016)
- Jennifer Vyvyan (1925–1974)
- Virginia Zeani (1925–2023)

1926

- Morag Beaton (1926–2010)
- Yvonne Ciannella (1926–2022)
- Myrtha Garbarini (1926–2015)
- Doreen Hume (1926–2022)
- Evelyn Lear (1926–2012)
- Margarita Miglau (1926–2013)
- Maralin Niska (1926–2016)
- Elinor Ross (1926–2020)
- Leonie Rysanek (1926–1998)
- Lotte Schädle (born 1926)
- Wilma Schmidt (1926–2022)
- Erna Spoorenberg (1926–2004)
- Joan Sutherland (1926–2010)
- Marilyn Tyler (1926–2017)
- Anita Välkki (1926–2011)
- Galina Vishnevskaya (1926–2012)

1927

- Ingrid Bjoner (1927–2006)
- Marie Collier (1927–1971)
- Régine Crespin (1927–2007)
- Anita Darian (1927–2015)
- Veronica Dunne (1927–2021)
- Hilda Hölzl (1927–1992)
- Laurel Hurley (1927–2013)
- Edith Kertész-Gabry (1927–2012)
- Karin Langebo (1927–2019)
- Melitta Muszely (1927–2023)
- Leontyne Price (born 1927)
- Suzanne Sarroca (1927–2023)
- Graziella Sciutti (1927–2001)
- Elisabeth Söderström (1927–2009)
- Teresa Stich-Randall (1927–2007)
- Claire Watson (1927–1986)

1928

- Klara Barlow (1928–2008)
- Adelaide Bishop (1928–2008)
- April Cantelo (1928–2024)
- Antonia Fahberg (1928–2016)
- Jean Fenn (1928–2021)
- Marjorie Finlay (1928–2003)
- Leyla Gencer (1928–2008)
- Andréa Guiot (1928–2021)
- Adele Leigh (1928–2004)
- Pilar Lorengar (1928–1996)
- Emily Mair (1928–2021)
- Judith Raskin (1928–1984)
- Irene Salemka (1928–2017)
- Jeannette Sinclair (born 1928)
- Isabel Strauss (1928–1973)
- Pauline Tinsley (1928–2021)
- Dolores Wilson (1928–2010)

1929

- Mildred Allen (1929–2021)
- June Bronhill (1929–2005)
- Clarice Carson (1929–2015)
- Gianna D'Angelo (1929–2013)
- Glafira Deomidova (1929–2017)
- Betty Fabila (1929–2012)
- Erzsébet Házy (1929–1982)
- Magda Ianculescu (1929–1995)
- Busk Margit Jonsson (born 1929)
- Sigrid Kehl (1929–2024)
- Halina Łukomska (1929–2016)
- Elaine Malbin (born 1929)
- Jolanda Meneguzzer (1929–2020)
- Margaret Nisbett (1929–2023)
- Antonietta Pastori (born 1929)
- Jane Rhodes (1929–2011)
- Anny Schlemm (1929–2026)
- Vera Schlosser (1929–2018)
- Beverly Sills (1929–2007)
- Sylvia Stahlman (1929–1998)
- Antonietta Stella (1929–2022)
- Gabriella Tucci (1929–2020)
- Asta Vihandi (1929–1993)

=== 1930s ===
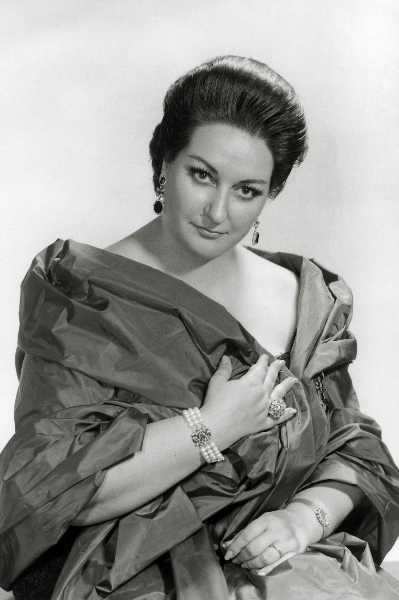
Montserrat Caballé

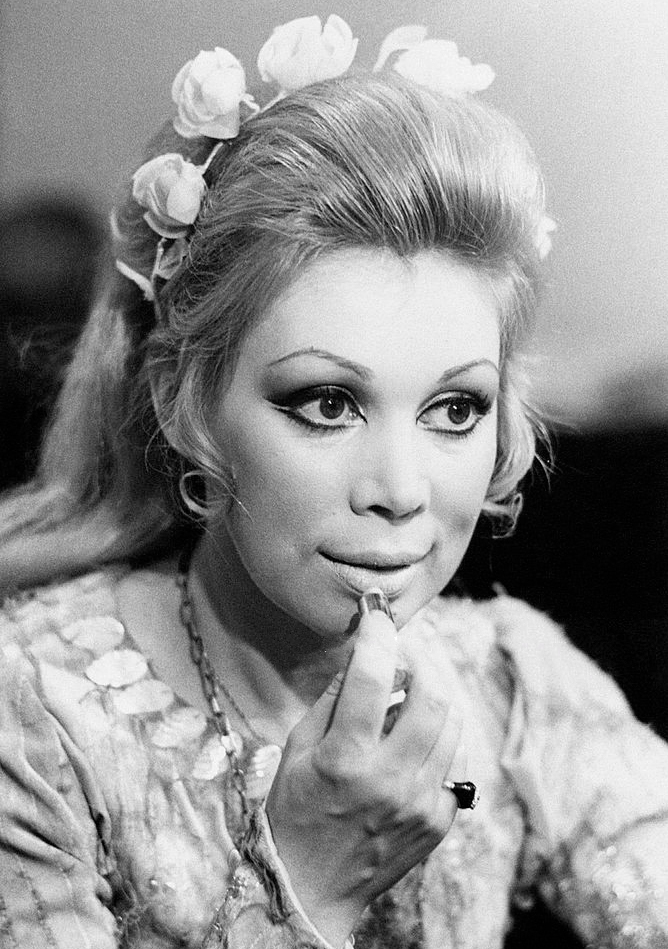
Mirella Freni

1930

- Monte Amundsen (1930 –2011)
- Elisabeth Breul (1930–2016)
- Rosanna Carteri (1930–2020)
- Lamara Chkonia (1930–2024)
- Mary Costa (born 1930)
- Emilia Cundari (1930–2005)
- Dorothy Dorow (1930–2017)
- Mina Foley (1930–2007)
- Christine Görner (born 1930)
- Heather Harper (1930–2019)
- Kirsten Hermansen (1930–2015)
- Betty Jones (1930–2019)
- Marni Nixon (1930–2016)
- Roberta Peters (1930–2017)
- Diana Petrynenko (1930–2018)
- Ruth-Margret Pütz (1930–2019)
- María Remolá (1930–2021)
- Arlene Saunders (1930–2020)
- Lucilla Udovich (1930–1999)
- Teresa Żylis-Gara (1930–2021)

1931

- Joyce Barker (1931 –1992)
- Liselotte Becker-Egner (1931–2015)
- Joan Carlyle (1931–2021)
- Anita Cerquetti (1931–2014)
- Fides Cuyugan-Asensio (born 1931)
- Netania Davrath (1931–1987)
- Gloria Davy (1931–2012)
- Cristina Deutekom (1931–2014)
- Ratiba El-Hefny (1931–2013)
- Margaret Gale (born 1931)
- Margareta Hallin (1931–2020)
- Sheila Jones Harms(1931–2004)
- Renate Holm (1931–2022)
- Harriet Forte Kennedy (1931–1994)
- Luisa Maragliano (born 1931)
- Mady Mesplé (1931–2020)
- Evgeniya Miroshnichenko (1931–2009)
- Dodi Protero (1931–2007)
- Audrey Schuh (1931–2023)
- Shirley Verrett (1931–2010)

1932

- Joan Carroll (born 1932)
- Joy Clements (1932–2005)
- Mimi Coertse (born 1932)
- Billie Lynn Daniel (1932–2002)
- Christiane Eda-Pierre (1932–2020)
- Reri Grist (born 1932)
- Lutfi Kabirova (1932–2013)
- Naděžda Kniplová (1932–2020)
- Ilva Ligabue (1932–1998)
- Anna Moffo (1932–2006)
- Lee Venora (born 1932)

1933

- Elly Ameling (born 1933)
- Margaret Baker Genovesi (c. 1933–2022)
- Radmila Bakočević (born 1933)
- Patricia Brooks (1933–1993)
- Montserrat Caballé (1933–2018)
- Cecilia Fusco (1933–2020)
- Françoise Garner (1933–2024)
- Anna Green (born 1933)
- Liselotte Hammes (born 1933)
- Rita Hunter (1933–2001)
- Leonore Kirschstein (1933–2017)
- Meral Menderes (1933–2011)
- Nicoletta Panni (1933–2017)
- Eugenia Ratti (1933–2020)
- Elisabeth Schwarzenberg (1933–2004)
- Bonna Søndberg (born 1933)
- Helena Tattermuschová (1933–2025)
- Jennifer Toye (1933–2022)

1934

- Mariella Adani (born 1934)
- Valentyna Arkanova (1934–2013)
- Oda Balsborg (1934–2014)
- Andrée Esposito (born 1934)
- Sylvia Geszty (1934–2018)
- Raina Kabaivanska (born 1934)
- Helena Łazarska (1934–2022)
- Berit Lindholm (1934–2023)
- Jacqueline Martel (1934–2017)
- Tamara Milashkina (1934–2024)
- Olivera Miljaković (born 1934)
- Birgit Nordin (1934–2022)
- Arpine Pehlivanian (1934–2004)
- Siff Pettersen (1934–2000)
- Galina Pisarenko (1934–2022)
- Orianna Santunione (1934–2023)
- Renata Scotto (1934–2023)
- Benita Valente (born 1934)
- Ursula Wendt-Walther (1934–2016)

1935

- Judith Beckmann (1935–2022)
- Colette Boky (born 1935)
- Marta Domingo (born 1935)
- Caroline Dumas (born 1935)
- Mirella Freni (1935–2020)
- Gianna Galli (1935–2010)
- Anne Pashley (1935–2016)
- Margherita Rinaldi (1935–2023)
- Francesca Roberto (born c. 1935)
- Mary Sansom (1935–2010)
- Margit Schramm (1935–1996)
- Carolyn Smith-Meyer (1935–2003)

1936

- Barbara Brandt (1936–2022)
- Althea Bridges (born 1936)
- Marie Daveluy (born 1936)
- Zdzisława Donat (born 1936)
- Marisa Galvany (born 1936)
- Ingeborg Hallstein (born 1936)
- Gwyneth Jones (born 1936)
- Junetta Jones (1936–2015)
- Claudia Lindsey (born 1936 or 1937)
- Mirella Parutto (born 1936)
- Janet Pavek (1936–2009)
- Marilyn Richardson (born 1936)
- Ursula Schröder-Feinen (1936–2005)
- Jeanette Scovotti (born 1936)
- Rita Shane (1936–2014)
- Carol Toscano (born 1936)
- Roswitha Trexler (born 1936)
- Ute Vinzing (born 1936)
- Margarita Voites (1936–2024)
- Rachel Yakar (1936–2023)
- Ma Yutao (born 1936)

1937

- Martina Arroyo (1937–2026)
- Hildegard Behrens (1937–2009)
- Victoria Bezetti (1937–2022)
- Grace Bumbry (1937–2023)
- Dolores Cambridge (1937–2024)
- June Card (born 1937)
- Joan Carden (born 1937)
- Maria de Francesca-Cavazza (born 1937)
- Catherine Gayer (born 1937)
- Gundula Janowitz (born 1937)
- Teresa Kubiak (born 1937)
- Catarina Ligendza (born 1937)
- Valerie Masterson (born 1937)
- Antoinette Miggiani (born 1937)
- Rita Orlandi-Malaspina (1937–2017)
- Maruja Troncoso Ortega (born 1937)
- Jeannette Pilou (1937–2020)
- Milka Stojanović (1937–2023)
- Elizabeth Vaughan (born 1937)
- Felicia Weathers (born 1937)
- Helen Zerefos (born 1937)

1938

- Celestina Casapietra (1938–2024)
- Janice Chapman (born 1938)
- Deborah Cook (1938–2019)
- Margaret Curphey (1938–2024)
- Wilma Driessen (born 1938)
- Elizabeth Harwood (1938–1990)
- Roberta Knie (1938–2017)
- Lone Koppel (born 1938)
- Adriana Maliponte (born 1938)
- Jane Manning (1938–2021)
- Edith Mathis (born 1938)
- Johanna Meier (born 1938)
- Yvonne Minton (born 1938)
- Edda Moser (born 1938)
- Janet Price (born 1938)
- Teresa Stratas (born 1938)
- Taru Valjakka (born 1938)

1939

- Arleen Auger (1939–1993)
- Mirjana Bohanec (born 1939)
- Jessica Cash (1939–2023)
- Maria Chiara (born 1939)
- Ileana Cotrubaș (1939–2026)
- Helga Dernesch (born 1939)
- Ángeles Gulín (1939–2002)
- Marie Hayward (1939–2011)
- Yoko Kawahara (born 1939)
- Janis Martin (1939–2014)
- Lois McDonall (born 1939)
- Marita Napier (1939–2004)
- Judith Nelson (1939–2012)
- Lucia Popp (1939–1993)
- Lilian Sukis (born 1939)
- Tsisana Tatishvili (1939–2017)
- Hildegard Uhrmacher (born 1939)

=== 1940s ===
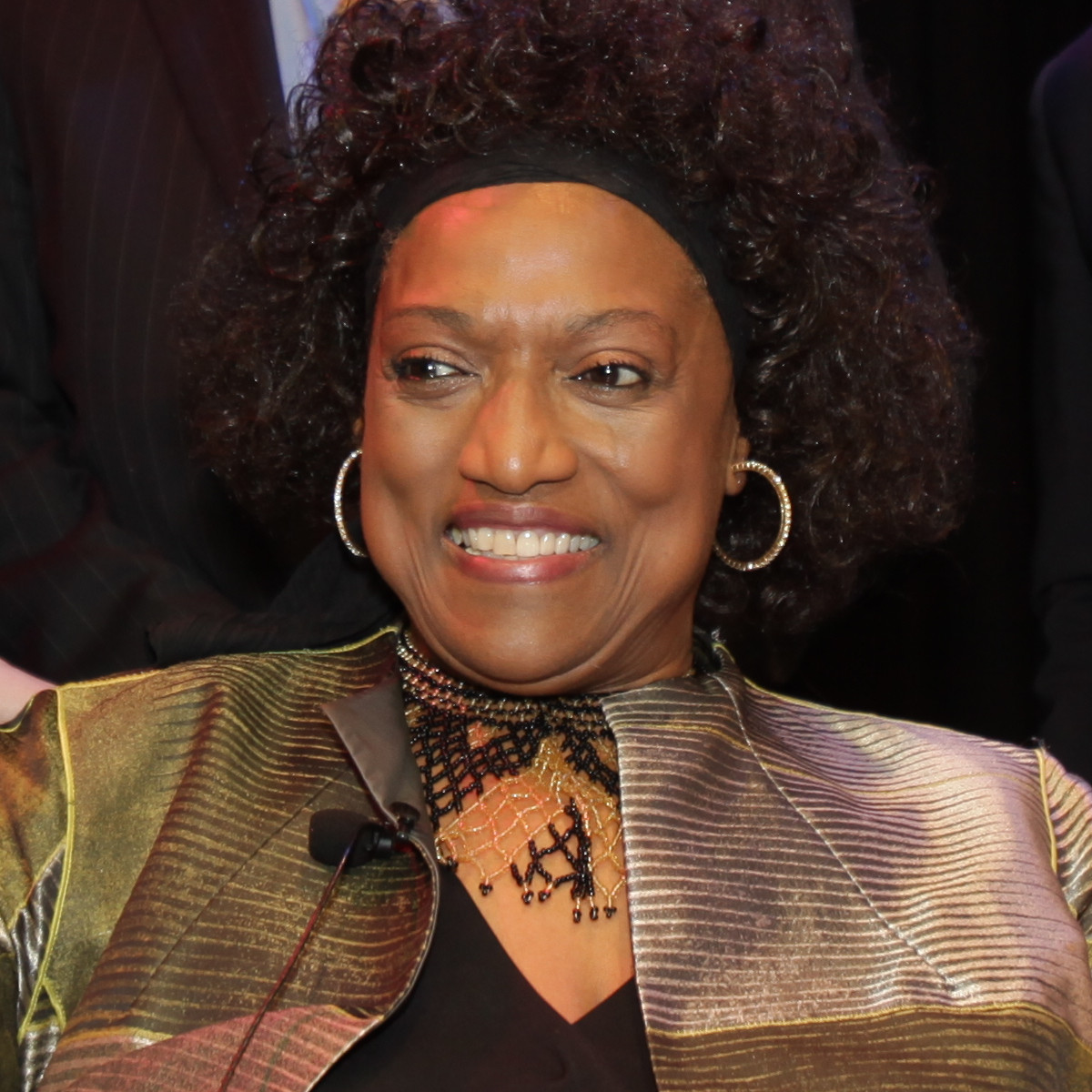
Jessye Norman

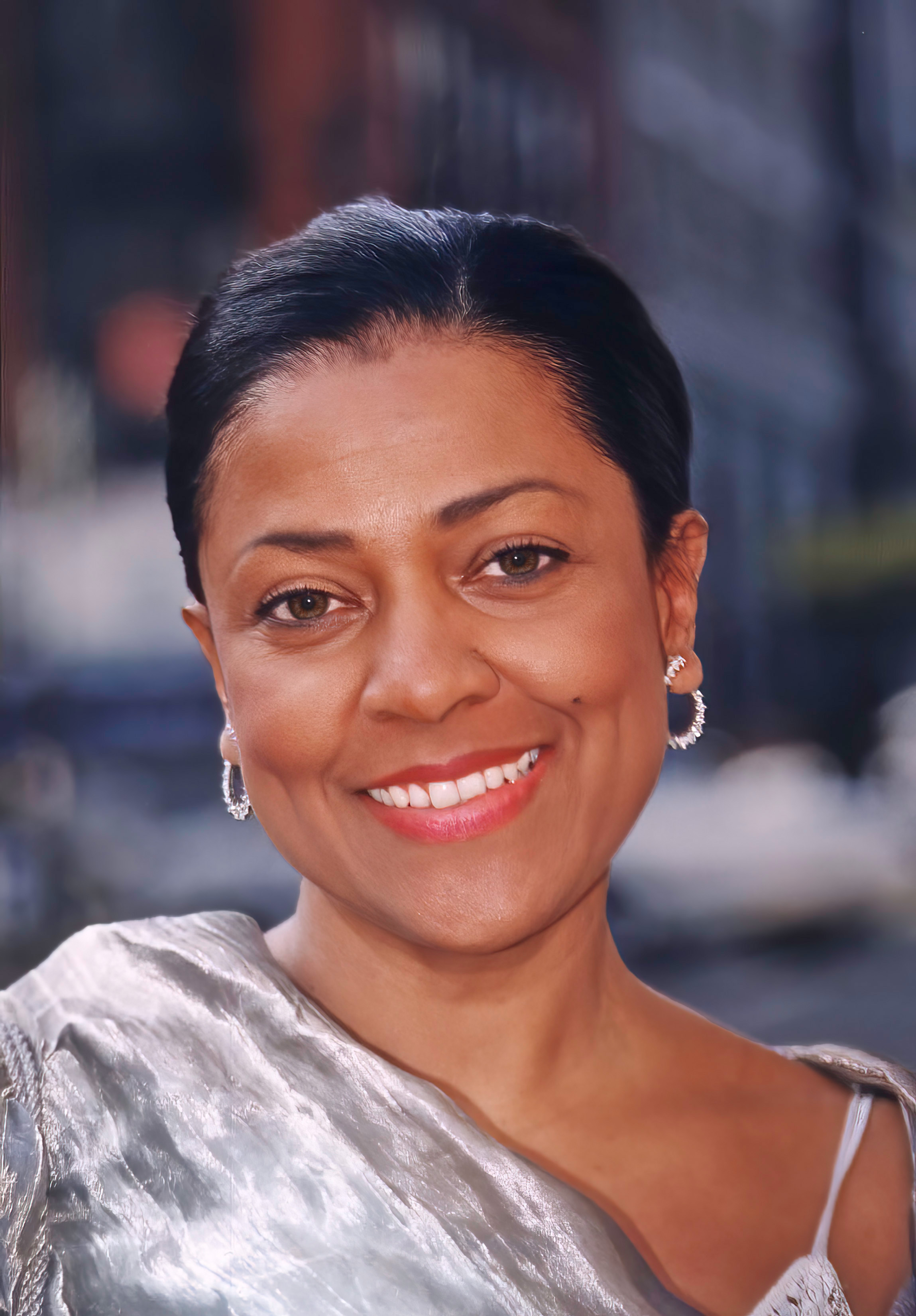
Kathleen Battle

1940

- Claudine Arnaud (1940–2017)
- Josephine Barstow (born 1940)
- Beverley Bergen (born 1940)
- Dorothea Chryst (born 1940)
- Gilda Cruz-Romo (born 1940)
- Helen Donath (born 1940)
- Beatriz Parra Durango (born 1940)
- Kay Griffel (born 1940)
- Rotraud Hansmann (born 1940)
- Hana Janků (1940–1995)
- Anu Kaal (born 1940)
- Urszula Koszut (1940–2023)
- Lilleba Lund Kvandal (1940–2016)
- Tiiu Levald (born 1940)
- Mary Beth Peil (born 1940)
- Galina Savova (1940–2021)
- Anja Silja (born 1940)
- Radmila Smiljanić (born 1940)
- Elisabeth Speiser (born 1940)
- Heather Thomson (born 1940)

1941

- Karan Armstrong (1941–2021)
- Judith Blegen (1941–2026)
- Hannelore Bode (born 1941)
- Eva-Maria Bundschuh (born 1941)
- Ghena Dimitrova (1941–2005)
- Anne Evans (born 1941)
- Glenys Fowles (born 1941)
- Tamara Lund (1941–2005)
- Suzanne Murphy (born 1941)
- Carol Plantamura (born 1941)
- Margaret Price (1941–2011)
- Carmen Reppel (born 1941)
- Helgi Sallo (born 1941)
- Alide Maria Salvetta (1941–1991)
- Anna Tomowa-Sintow (born 1941)
- Júlia Várady (born 1941)
- Mara Zampieri (born 1941)

1942

- Sheila Armstrong (born 1942)
- Luana DeVol (born 1942)
- Loretta Di Franco (born 1942)
- Ruth Falcon (1942–2020)
- Jill Gomez (1942–2026)
- Makvala Kasrashvili (born 1942)
- Marina Krilovici (born 1942)
- Maryetta Midgley (born 1942)
- Romalı Perihan (1942–2016)
- Astrid Schirmer (born 1942)
- Jeannette Zarou (born 1942)

1943

- Susan Davenny-Wyner (born 1943)
- Gisela Ehrensperger (born 1943)
- Ingrid Haubold (born 1943)
- Jana Jonášová (born 1943)
- Malvina Major (born 1943)
- Éva Marton (born 1943)
- Joyce Mathis (1943–1994)
- Adelaida Negri (1943–2019)
- Maria Pellegrini (born 1943)
- Faye Robinson (born 1943)
- Barbara Schlick (born 1943)
- Norma Sharp (born 1943)
- Elena Souliotis (1943–2004)
- Lynne Strow Piccolo (born 1943)
- Irma Urrila (born 1943)
- Dunja Vejzović (born 1943)

1944

- Gabriela Beňačková (born 1944 or 1947)
- Joanna Bruno (born 1944)
- Norma Burrowes (born 1944)
- Krisztina Laki (born 1944)
- Felicity Palmer (born 1944)
- Kiri Te Kanawa (born 1944)
- Susan Larson (born 1944)
- Ellen Shade (born 1944)
- Riki Turofsky (born 1944)
- Lyn Vernon (born 1944)
- Marilyn Zschau (born 1944)

1945

- Lisbeth Balslev (born 1945)
- Renate Behle (born 1945)
- Phyllis Bryn-Julson (born 1945)
- Giovanna Casolla (born 1945)
- Lella Cuberli (born 1945)
- Sona Ghazarian (born 1945)
- Věnceslava Hrubá-Freiberger (born 1945)
- Evelyn Mandac (born 1945)
- Julia Migenes (born 1945)
- Betsy Norden (born 1945)
- Jessye Norman (1945–2019)
- Jennifer Smith (born 1945)
- Thais St. Julien (1945–2019)
- Karin Ott (born 1945)

1946

- Elizabeth Connell (1946–2012)
- Barbara Daniels (born 1946)
- Magdalena Falewicz (born 1946)
- Carole Farley (born 1946)
- Julia Goss (1946–2023)
- Edita Gruberová (1946–2021)
- Eilene Hannan (1946–2014)
- Magdaléna Hajóssyová (born 1946)
- Carol Neblett (1946–2017)
- Inga Nielsen (1946–2008)
- Elena Mauti Nunziata (1946–2024)
- Katia Ricciarelli (born 1946)
- Gail Robinson (1946–2008)
- Nancy Shade (born 1946)
- Luciana Serra (born 1946)
- Diana Soviero (born 1946)
- Georgeta Stoleriu (born 1946)
- María Uriz (born 1946)
- Christine Weidinger (1946–2024)
- Sherry Zannoth (1946–2012)
- Irina Zhurina (born 1946)
- Andrea Zsadon (born 1946)

1947

- Colette Alliot-Lugaz (born 1947)
- Patricia Craig (born 1947)
- Kathryn Day (born 1947)
- Fidan Gasimova (born 1947)
- Sheri Greenawald (born 1947)
- Hildegard Heichele (born 1947)
- Michèle Lagrange (born 1947)
- Felicity Lott (1947–2026)
- Janet Perry (born 1947)
- Lillian Watson (born 1947)

1948

- Jeannine Altmeyer (born 1948)
- Carmen Balthrop (1948–2021)
- Kathleen Battle (born 1948)
- Clamma Dale (born 1948)
- Mariella Devia (born 1948)
- Faith Esham (born 1948)
- Linda Esther Gray (born 1948)
- Barbara Hendricks (born 1948)
- Catherine Malfitano (born 1948)
- Mariana Nicolesco (1948–2022)
- Lyudmila Shirina (born 1948)
- Mariia Stefiuk (born 1948)
- Ruth Welting (1948–1999)

1949

- Roberta Alexander (1949–2025)
- Andrea Bradford (born 1949)
- Cynthia Clarey (born 1949)
- Mioara Cortez (born 1949)
- Wilhelmenia Fernandez (1949–2024)
- Sabine Hass (1949–1999)
- Marjon Lambriks (born 1949)
- Margaret Anne Marshall (born 1949)
- Myra Merritt (born 1949)
- Leona Mitchell (born 1949)
- Carola Nossek (born 1949)
- Emma Aline Osgood (1949–2011)
- Rosalind Plowright (born 1949)
- Deborah Polaski (born 1949)
- Françoise Pollet (born 1949)
- Martha Sheil (born 1949)
- Linda Zoghby (born 1949)

=== 1950s ===
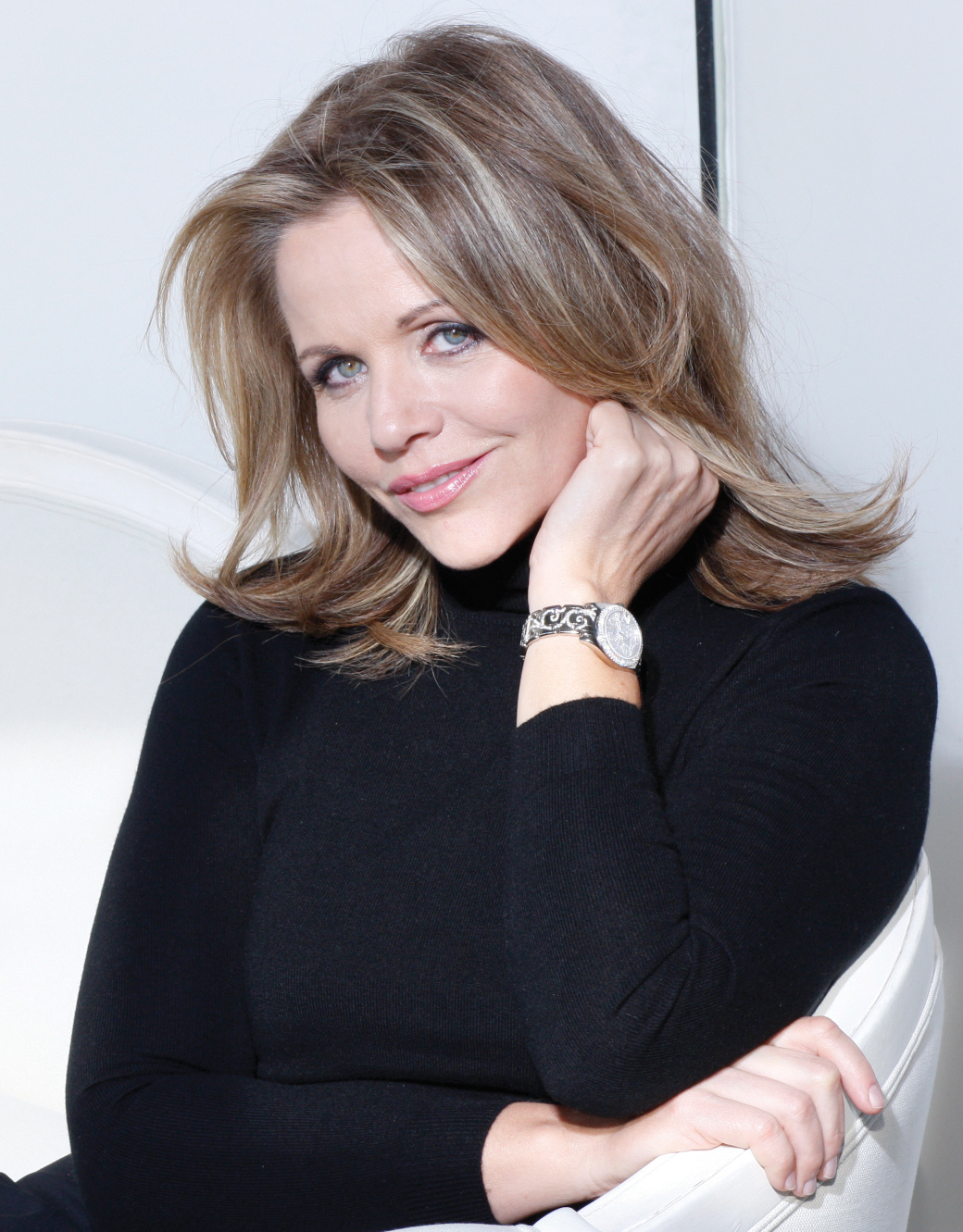
Renée Fleming

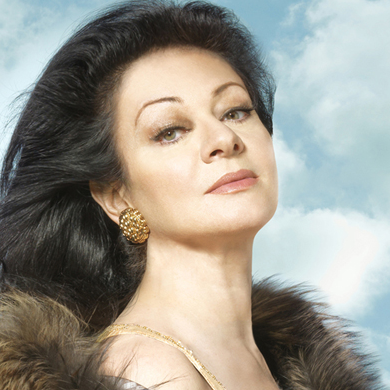
Daniela Dessi

1950

- Maria Abajan (born 1950)
- Maria Ewing (1950–2022)
- Maria Guleghina (born 1959)
- Yvonne Kenny (born 1950)
- Carolann Page (born 1950)
- Natalia Rom (born 1950)
- Ioanna Sfekas-Karvelas (born 1950)
- Elżbieta Towarnicka (born 1950)
- Regina Werner-Dietrich (born 1950)
- Edith Wiens (born 1950)

1951

- Grażyna Brodzińska (born 1951)
- Eliane Coelho (born 1951)
- Lê Dung (1951–2001)
- Khuraman Gasimova (born 1951)
- Ana María González (born 1951)
- Kathryn Harries (1951–2023)
- Beverly Hoch (born 1951)
- Elizabeth Parcells (1951–2005)
- Sylvia Sass (born 1951)
- Gabriele Schnaut (1951–2023)
- Maria Spacagna (born 1951)
- Sharon Sweet (born 1951)
- Natalia Troitskaya (1951–2006)

1952

- June Anderson (born 1952)
- Julianne Baird (born 1952)
- Catherine Bott (born 1952)
- Gwendolyn Bradley (born 1952)
- Kristine Ciesinski (1952–2018)
- Rebecca Copley (born 1952)
- Cyril and Libbye Hellier (1952)
- Jill Feldman (born 1952)
- Karen Holvik (born 1952)
- Nelly Miricioiu (born 1952)
- Ashley Putnam (born 1952)
- Gianna Rolandi (1952–2021)
- Carol Vaness (born 1952)

1953

- Lynne Dawson (born 1953)
- Andrea Ihle (1953–2023)
- Lotty Ipinza (born 1953)
- Camellia Johnson (1953–2015)
- Geraldine McMillian (born 1953)
- Denia Mazzola (born 1953)
- Jolanta Omilian (born 1953)
- Nadine Secunde (born 1953)
- Galina Shoidagbaeva (born 1953)
- Amanda Thane (1953–2012)
- Yoko Watanabe (1953–2004)

1954

- Isobel Buchanan (born 1954)
- Susan Dunn (born 1954)
- Katalin Farkas (born 1954)
- Angela Feeney (born 1954)
- Inese Galante (born 1954)
- Virginia Kerr (born 1954)
- Youngmi Kim (born 1954)
- Marvis Martin (born 1954)
- Marie McLaughlin (born 1954)
- Marilyn Mims (born 1954)

1955

- Maurizia Barazzoni (born 1955)
- Harolyn Blackwell (born 1955)
- Christine Brewer (born 1955)
- Diddú (born 1955)
- Frances Ginsberg (1955–2010)
- Nikki Li Hartliep (born 1955)
- Charlotte Margiono (born 1955)
- Gabriele Sima (1955–2016)
- Cheryl Studer (born 1955)
- Jayne West

1956

- Helen Adams (born 1956)
- Carmen Anhorn (born 1956)
- Barbara Bonney (born 1956)
- Barbara Fris (born 1956)
- Gwynne Geyer (born 1956)
- Nancy Gustafson (born 1956)
- Lyubov Kazarnovskaya (born 1956)
- Cynthia Makris (born 1956)
- Sylvia McNair (born 1956)
- Waltraud Meier (born 1956)
- Joan Rodgers (born 1956)
- Gabriele Rossmanith (born 1956)
- Elżbieta Szmytka (born 1956)
- Korliss Uecker (born 1956)
- Kaia Urb (born 1956)
- Romana Vaccaro (1956–2024)
- Sylvie Valayre (born 1956)
- Mila Vilotijević (born 1956)
- Elisabeth Wärnfeldt (born 1956)
- Linda Watson (born 1956)

1957

- Lucia Aliberti (born 1957)
- Nancy Argenta (born 1957)
- Anne Azéma (born 1957)
- Lioba Braun (born 1957)
- Daniela Dessì (1957–2016)
- Jenny Drivala (born 1957)
- Monika Frimmer (1957–2022)
- Lisa Gasteen (born 1957)
- Miriam Gauci (born 1957)
- Soile Isokoski (born 1957)
- Guillemette Laurens (born 1957)
- Ewa Malas-Godlewska (born 1957)
- Alessandra Marc (born 1957)
- Susan Narucki (born 1957)
- Nina Rautio (born 1957)
- Gitta-Maria Sjöberg (born 1957)
- Vivian Tierney (born 1957)
- Stella Zambalis (born 1957)

1958

- María Bayo (born 1958)
- Susan Bullock (born 1958)
- Kathleen Cassello (1958–2017)
- Maria Dragoni (born 1958)
- Lauren Flanigan (born 1958)
- Gabriele Fontana (born 1958)
- Cynthia Haymon (born 1958)
- Eva Johansson (born 1958)
- Tina Kiberg (born 1958)
- Françoise Kubler (born 1958)
- Hillevi Martinpelto (born 1958)
- Annick Massis (born 1958)
- Agnès Mellon (born 1958)
- Aprile Millo (born 1958)
- Vlatka Oršanić (born 1958)
- Deborah Riedel (1958–2009)
- Deborah Sasson (born 1958)
- Dagmar Schellenberger (born 1958)
- Sonia Theodoridou (born 1958)
- Dilber Yunus (born 1958)

1959

- Rebecca Caine (born 1959)
- Pamela Coburn (born 1959)
- Michèle Crider (born 1959)
- Catherine Dubosc (born 1959)
- Felicia Filip (born 1959)
- Renée Fleming (born 1959)
- Maria Guleghina (born 1959)
- Hong Hei-kyung (born 1959)
- Joanna Kozłowska (born 1959)
- Lena Lootens (born 1959)
- Sabina Mossolow (born 1959)
- Elizabeth Norberg-Schulz (born 1959)
- Susan Owen (born 1959)
- Sarah Payne (born 1959)
- Ulrike Sonntag (born 1959)
- Ruth Ann Swenson (born 1959)

=== 1960s ===
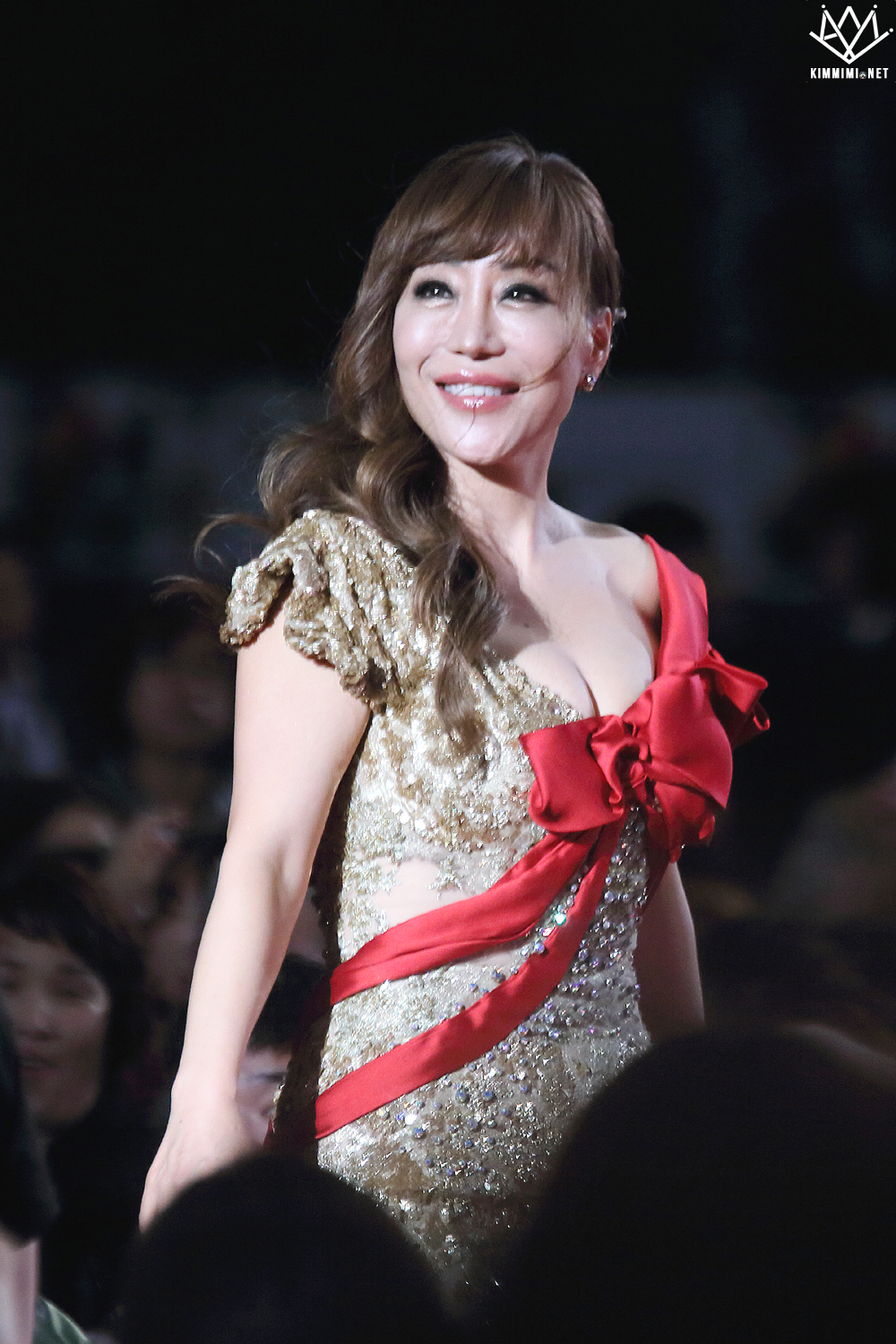
Sumi Jo

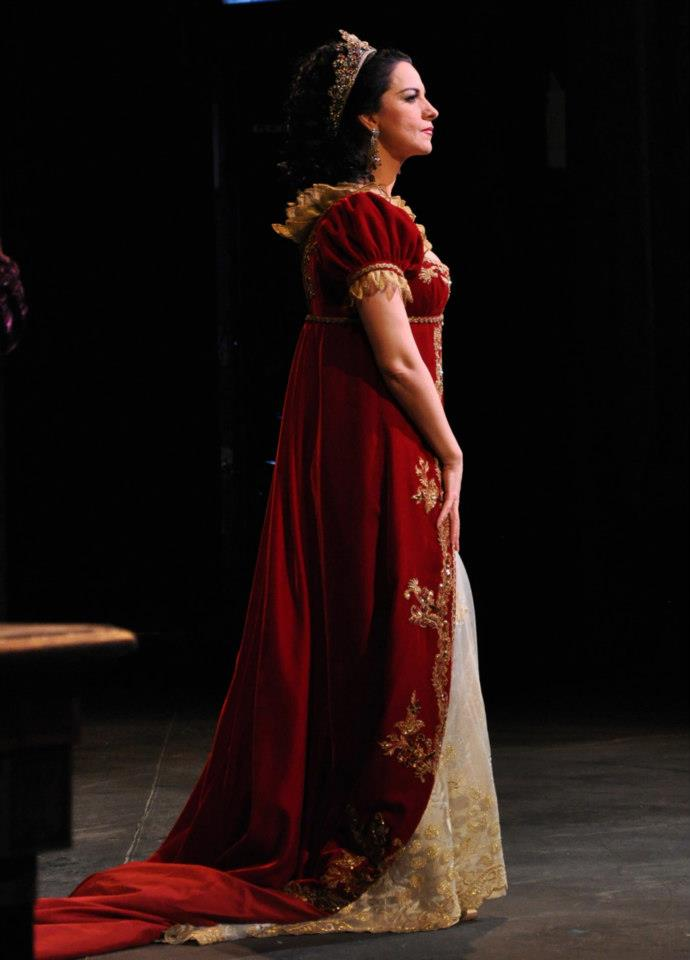
Angela Gheorghiu

1960

- Cheryl Barker (born 1960)
- Jane Eaglen (born 1960)
- Cecilia Gasdia (born 1960)
- Karita Mattila (born 1960)
- Regina Nathan (born 1960)
- Patricia Rozario (born 1960)
- Lisa Saffer (born 1960)
- Ute Selbig (born 1960)
- Ulrike Steinsky (born 1960)
- Phyllis Treigle (born 1960)
- Dawn Upshaw (born 1960)
- Leontina Vaduva (born 1960)
- Elizabeth Vidal (born 1960)
- Deborah Voigt (born 1960)

1961

- Anna Caterina Antonacci (born 1961)
- Tracy Dahl (born 1961)
- Angela Denoke (born 1961)
- Kallen Esperian (born 1961)
- Valeria Esposito (born 1961)
- Amelia Felle (born 1961)
- Nuccia Focile (born 1961)
- Alison Hagley (born 1961)
- Constance Hauman (born 1961)
- Ingrid Kaiserfeld (born 1961)
- Turid Karlsen (born 1961)
- Suzie LeBlanc (born 1961)
- Marquita Lister (born 1961)
- Claron McFadden (born 1961)
- Ľuba Orgonášová (born 1961)
- Hasmik Papian (born 1961)
- Cyndia Sieden (born 1961)
- Eva Urbanová (born 1961)
- Violeta Urmana (born 1961)
- Hendrikje Wangemann (born 1961)
- Shin Youngok (born 1961)
- Monique Zanetti (born 1961)
- Elena Zelenskaya (born 1961)

1962

- Mireille Delunsch (born 1962)
- Sumi Jo (born 1962)
- Petra Lang (born 1962)
- Romelia Lichtenstein (born 1962)
- Pille Lill (born 1962)
- Rosa Mannion (born 1962)
- Noëmi Nadelmann (born 1962)
- Cara O'Sullivan (1962–2021)
- Ildikó Raimondi (born 1962)
- Susanne Rydén (born 1962)
- Krassimira Stoyanova (born 1962)
- Ludmila Vernerová (born 1962)
- Margaret Jane Wray (1962–2025)

1963

- Lívia Ághová (born 1963)
- Mechthild Bach (born 1963)
- Janice Baird (born 1963)
- Henriette Bonde-Hansen (born 1963)
- Angela Brown (born 1963)
- Susan Chilcott (1963–2003)
- Sharon Coste (born 1963)
- Rebecca Evans (born 1963)
- Elizabeth Futral (born 1963)
- Evelyn Herlitzius (born 1963)
- Solveig Kringlebotn (born 1963)
- Inva Mula (born 1963)
- Christiane Oelze (born 1963)
- Adrianne Pieczonka (born 1963)
- Marina Prior (born 1963)
- Larisa Rudakova (born 1963)
- Petra Schmidt (born 1963)
- Nina Stemme (born 1963)
- Darina Takova (born 1963)
- Iréne Theorin (born 1963)
- Ruth Ziesak (born 1963)

1964

- Laura Aikin (born 1964)
- Marion Ammann (born 1964)
- Ainhoa Arteta (born 1964)
- Ingela Brimberg (born 1964)
- Inger Dam-Jensen (born 1964)
- Deborah Cheetham Fraillon (born 1964)
- Rosemary Joshua (born 1964)
- Anne Lünenbürger (born 1964)
- Elisabete Matos (born 1964)
- Mary Mills (born 1964)
- Elena Moșuc (born 1964)
- Annette Seiltgen (born 1964)
- Deborah York (born 1964)
- Johannette Zomer (born 1964)

1965

- Claudia Barainsky (born 1965)
- Anda-Louise Bogza (born 1965)
- Ilana Davidson (born 1965)
- Natalie Dessay (born 1965)
- Angela Gheorghiu (born 1965)
- Susan Gritton (born 1965)
- Nicole Heaston (born 1965)
- Christiane Iven (born 1965)
- Simone Kermes (born 1965)
- Lise Lindstrom (born 1965)
- Zhang Liping (born 1965)
- Emily Magee (born 1965)
- Heidi Grant Murphy (born 1965)
- Catherine Naglestad (born 1965)
- Sandrine Piau (born 1965)
- Patricia Racette (born 1965)
- Christine Schäfer (born 1965)
- Anke Sieloff (born 1965)
- Caroline Stein (born 1965)
- Svetla Vassileva (born 1965)
- Verónica Villarroel (born 1965)
- Janet Williams (born 1965)

1966

- Heidi Brunner (born 1966)
- Fiorenza Cedolins (born 1966)
- Danuta Dudzińska-Wieczorek (born 1966)
- Mary Dunleavy (born 1966)
- Mihoko Fujimura (born 1966)
- Karina Gauvin (born 1966)
- Véronique Gens (born 1966)
- Andrea Gruber (born 1966)
- Malin Hartelius (born 1966)
- Roberta Invernizzi (born 1966)
- Dawn Kotoski (born 1966)
- Eva Lind (born 1966)
- Victoria Loukianetz (born 1966)
- Isabel Rey (born 1966)
- Amanda Roocroft (born 1966)
- Elisabeth Scholl (born 1966)
- Erika Sunnegårdh (born 1966)
- Jennifer Wilson (born 1966)

1967

- Bodil Arnesen (born 1967)
- Stefania Bonfadelli (born 1967)
- Patrizia Ciofi (born 1967)
- Elena Dan (1967–1996)
- Melanie Diener (born 1967)
- Barbara Frittoli (born 1967)
- Lidija Horvat-Dunjko (born 1967)
- Anu Komsi (born 1967)
- Lisa Larsson (born 1967)
- Eva Mei (born 1967)
- María José Moreno (born 1967)
- Dawn Padmore (born 1967)
- Emily Pulley (born 1967)
- Alaine Rodin (born 1967)
- Dorothea Röschmann (born 1967)
- Anne Schwanewilms (born 1967)
- Lisa Tyrrell (born 1967)

1968

- Sophie Daneman (born 1968)
- Laura Claycomb (born 1968)
- Helen Donaldson (born 1968)
- Ying Huang (born 1968)
- Ásgerður Júníusdóttir (born 1968)
- Anja Kampe (born 1968)
- Michaela Kaune (born 1968)
- Camilla Nylund (born 1968)
- Olga Pasichnyk (born 1968)
- Marlis Petersen (born 1968)
- Claudia Pop (born 1968)
- Heidi Skok (born 1968)
- Alexandra von der Weth (born 1968)

1969

- Juliane Banse (born 1969)
- Fabiana Bravo (born 1969)
- Andión Fernández (born 1969)
- Robin Follman (born 1969)
- Christine Goerke (born 1969)
- Eglise Gutiérrez (born 1969)
- Arndís Halla (born 1969)
- Jonita Lattimore (born 1969)
- Linda Lister (born 1969)
- Anahit Mekhitarian (born 1969)
- Nadja Michael (born 1969)
- Lani Misalucha (born 1969)
- Ann-Helen Moen (born 1969)
- Mayra Muhammad-kyzy (born 1969)
- Miah Persson (born 1969)
- Sondra Radvanovsky (born 1969)
- Gerlinde Sämann (born 1969)
- Suzana Šuvaković Savić (1969–2016)
- Regina Schörg (born 1969)

=== 1970s ===
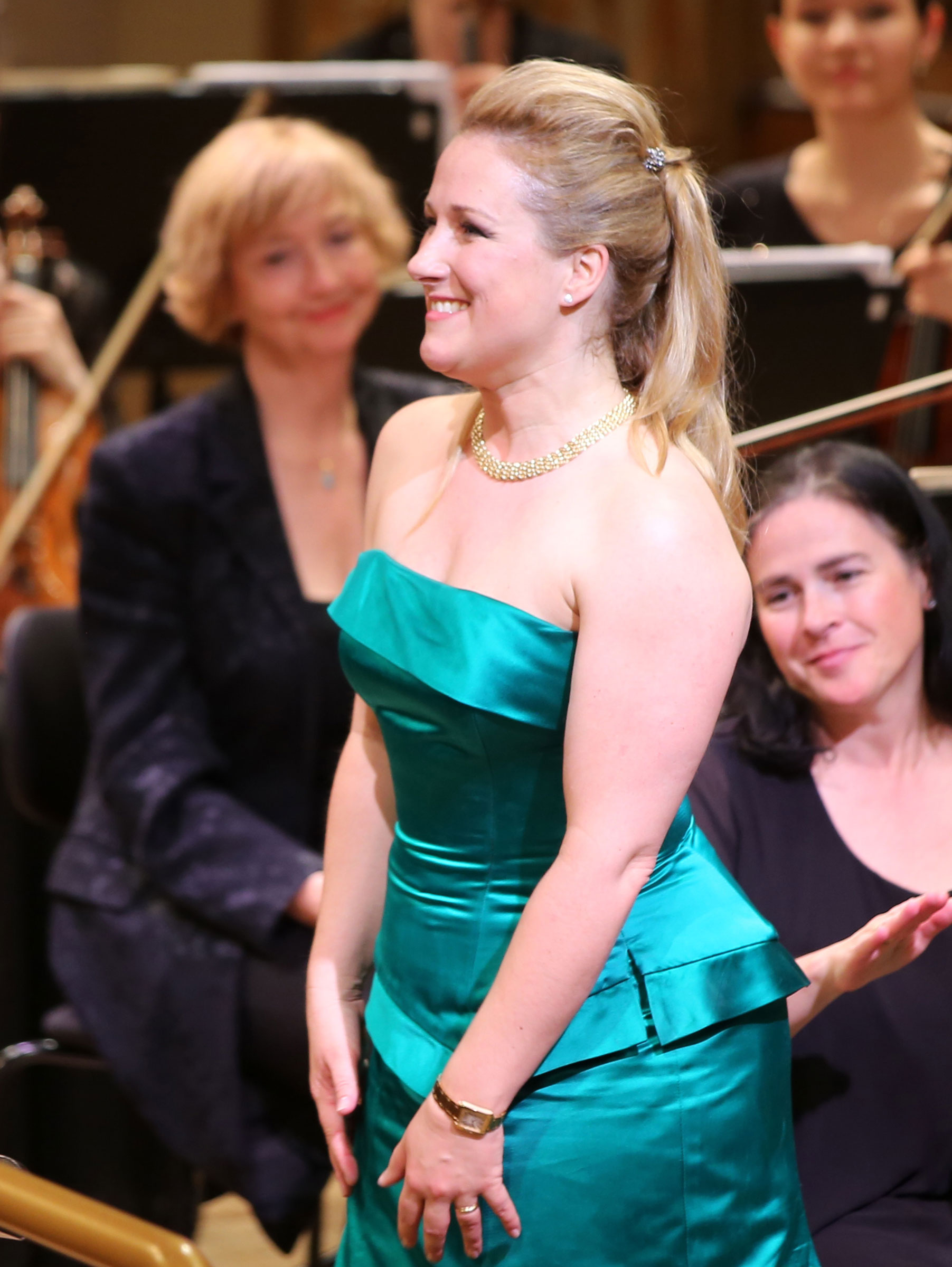
Diana Damrau

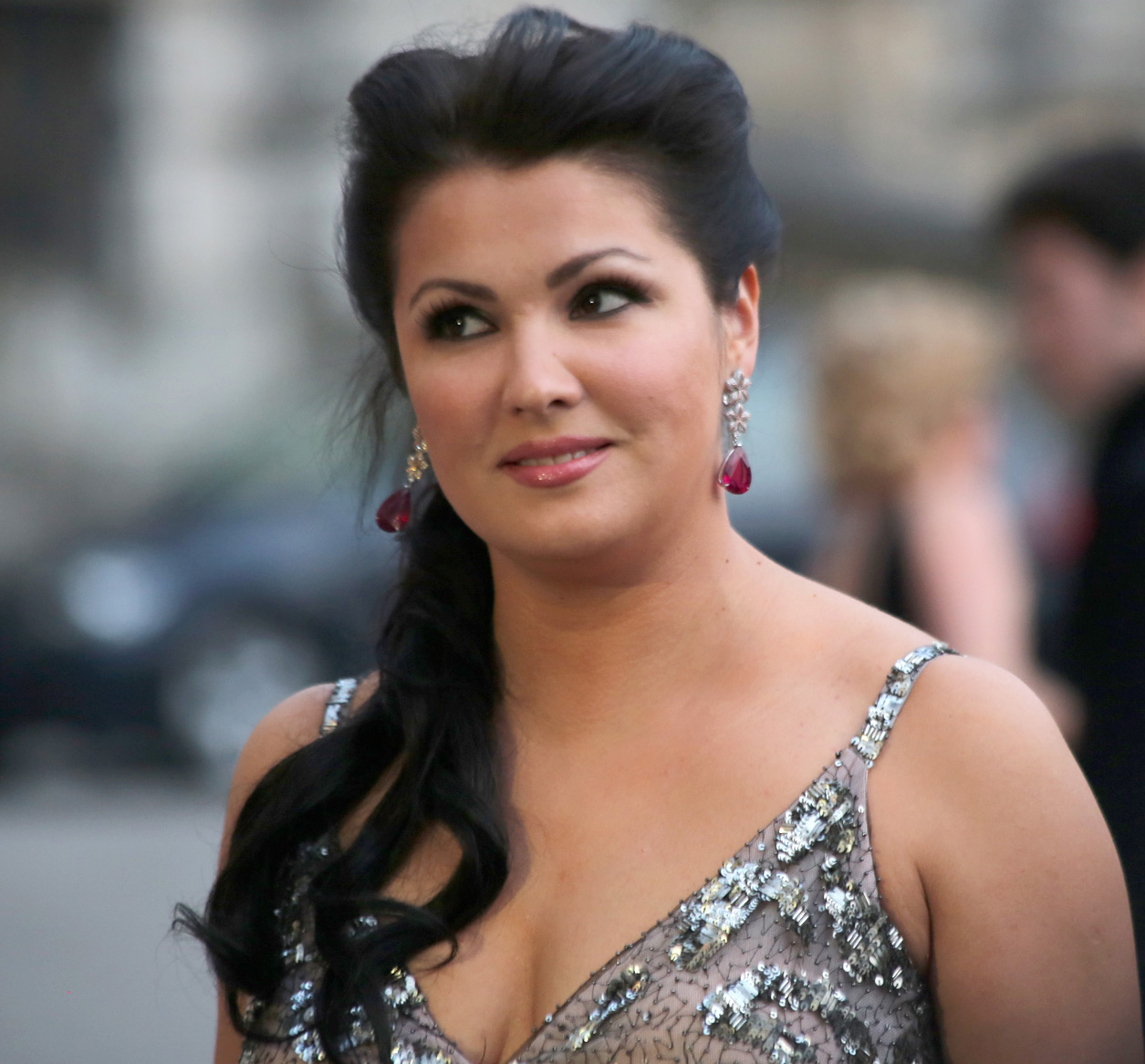
Anna Netrebko

1970

- Norah Amsellem (born 1970)
- Amelia Farrugia (born 1970)
- Hibla Gerzmava (born 1970)
- Esther Heideman (born 1970)
- Isabelle Kabatu (born 1970)
- Dina Kuznetsova (born 1970)
- Marie-Josée Lord (born 1970)
- Emma Matthews (born 1970)
- Audra McDonald (born 1970)
- Gaëlle Méchaly (born 1970)
- Stella Mendonça (born 1970)
- Erika Miklósa (born 1970)
- Maki Mori (born 1970)
- Alexandrina Pendatchanska (born 1970)
- Patricia Petibon (born 1970)
- Silvia Tro Santafé (born 1970)
- Irmgard Vilsmaier (born 1970)
- Eva-Maria Westbroek (born 1970)

1971

- Gun-Brit Barkmin (born 1971)
- Alicia Berneche (born 1971)
- Marnie Breckenridge (born 1971)
- Roxana Briban (1971–2010)
- Diana Damrau (born 1971)
- Klaudia Dernerová (born 1971)
- Marie Devellereau (born 1971)
- Jolana Fogašová (born 1971)
- Barbara Hannigan (born 1971)
- Tamar Iveri (born 1971)
- Tiffany Jackson (born 1971)
- Maria Keohane (born 1971)
- Julia Kogan (born 1971)
- Eteri Lamoris (born 1971)
- Ana María Martínez (born 1971)
- Dorothee Mields (born 1971)
- Aga Mikolaj (1971–2021)
- Anna Netrebko (born 1971)
- Britta Stallmeister (born 1971)
- Camilla Tilling (born 1971)

1972

- Jennifer Aylmer (born 1972)
- Sarah Crane (born 1972)
- Gabriela Eibenová (born 1972)
- Taryn Fiebig (1972–2021)
- Anja Harteros (born 1972)
- Dara Hobbs (born 1972)
- He Hui (born 1972)
- Martina Janková (born 1972)
- Gillian Keith (born 1972)
- Montserrat Martí (born 1972)
- Edyta Piasecka (born 1972)
- Claire Rutter (born 1972)
- Simone Schneider (born 1972)
- Mirjam Tola (born 1972)
- Pavla Vykopalová (born 1972)
- Arianna Zukerman (born 1972)

1973

- Titilayo Adedokun (born 1973)
- Kerstin Avemo (born 1973)
- Maria Luigia Borsi (born 1973)
- Andrea Brown (born 1973)
- Malin Byström (born 1973)
- Ann-Mari Edvardsen (born 1973)
- Serena Farnocchia (born 1973)
- Sarah Fox (born 1973)
- Rachel Harnisch (born 1973)
- Elisabeth Kulman (born 1973)
- Margaret Lloyd (born 1973)
- Joanne Lunn (born 1973)
- Elena Manistina (born 1973)
- Bárbara Padilla (born 1973)
- Sabina Puértolas (born 1973)
- Hila Plitmann (born 1973)
- Carmela Remigio (born 1973)
- Tatjana Romanova-Vorontsova (born 1973)
- Vera Schoenenberg (born 1973)
- Stacey Tappan (born 1973)
- Kristina Vähi (born 1973)

1974

- Anja Augustin (born 1974)
- Isabel Bayrakdarian (born 1974)
- Elizabeth Caballero (born 1974)
- Gabriella Di Laccio (born c.1974)
- Katia Escalera (born 1974)
- Ermonela Jaho (born 1974)
- Kelly Kaduce (born 1974)
- Anja Kaesmacher (born 1974)
- Sophie Karthäuser (born 1974)
- Nomeda Kazlaus (born 1974)
- Annemarie Kremer (born 1974)
- Elizabeth Llewellyn (born 1974)
- Carolyn Sampson (born 1974)
- Talise Trevigne (born 1974)
- Karin Wolverton (born 1974)

1975

- Hanan Alattar (born 1975)
- Aile Asszonyi (born 1975)
- Maria Bengtsson (born 1975)
- Amel Brahim-Djelloul (born 1975)
- Alexandra Deshorties (born 1975)
- Julianna Di Giacomo (born 1975)
- Mojca Erdmann (born 1975)
- Florencia Fabris (1975–2013)
- Catherine Foster (born 1975)
- Carmen Giannattasio (born 1975)
- Anne-Catherine Gillet (born 1975)
- Riki Guy (born 1975)
- Salomé Haller (born 1975)
- Lianna Haroutounian (born 1975)
- Genia Kühmeier (born 1975)
- Gilda Lyons (born 1975)
- Natasha Marsh (born 1975)
- Sally Matthews (born 1975)
- Liudmyla Monastyrska (born 1975)
- Nuria Rial (born 1975)
- Maria Grazia Schiavo (born 1975)
- Shuna Scott Sendall (born 1975)
- Celena Shafer (born 1975)
- Sara Braga Simões (born 1975)
- Ekaterina Siurina (born 1975)
- Ailish Tynan (born 1975)
- Erin Wall (1975–2020)

1976

- Laura Alonso (born 1976)
- Anna Christy (born 1976)
- Annette Dasch (born 1976)
- Maria Fontosh (born 1976)
- Amanda Forsythe (born 1976)
- Christina Gerstberger (born 1976)
- Hannah Holgersson (born 1976)
- Sunhae Im (born 1976)
- Ana James (born 1976)
- Helena Juntunen (born 1976)
- Tania Kross (born 1976)
- Adriana Kučerová (born 1976)
- Magali Léger (born 1976)
- Ann Moss (born 1976)
- Melliangee Pérez (born 1976)
- Barbara Quintiliani (born 1976)
- Elin Rombo (born 1976)
- Céline Scheen (born 1976)
- Amira Selim (born 1976)
- Marita Solberg (born 1976)
- Nadja Stefanoff (born 1976)
- Virginia Tola (born 1976)
- Sandra Trattnigg (born 1976)
- Camille Zamora (born 1976)
- Chiara Zeffirelli (born 1976)

1977

- Susanna Andersson (born 1977)
- Measha Brueggergosman (born 1977)
- Nicole Cabell (born 1977)
- Sarah Coburn (born 1977)
- Sabina Cvilak (born 1977)
- Alenka Gotar (born 1977)
- Othalie Graham (born 1977)
- Joni Henson (born 1977)
- Cecilia Hjortsberg (born 1977)
- Irina Iordachescu (born 1977)
- Aleksandra Kurzak (born 1977)
- Christina Landshamer (born 1977)
- Disella Larusdottir (born 1977)
- Nathalie Manfrino (born 1977)
- Angela Meade (born 1977)
- Claire Meghnagi (born 1977)
- Marina Poplavskaya (born 1977)
- Desirée Rancatore (born 1977)
- Lenneke Ruiten (born 1977)
- Ekaterina Scherbachenko (born 1977)
- Rebecca Sjöwall (born 1977)
- Zanne Stapelberg (born 1977)
- Elin Manahan Thomas (born 1977)
- Frédérique Vézina (born 1977)

1978

- Maria Agresta (born 1978)
- Lucy Crowe (born 1978)
- Oksana Dyka (born 1978)
- Nikki Einfeld (born 1978)
- Siranush Gasparyan (born 1978)
- Teodora Gheorghiu (born 1978)
- Jennifer Holloway (born 1978)
- Audrey Luna (born 1978)
- Eleonore Marguerre (born 1978)
- Iva Mihanović (born 1978)
- Lisa Hopkins Seegmiller (born 1978)
- Heidi Stober (born 1978)
- Burcu Uyar (born 1978)
- Elena Xanthoudakis (born 1978)

1979

- Greta Bradman (born 1979 or 1982)
- Danielle de Niese (born 1979)
- Helena Dix (born 1979)
- Stefania Dovhan (born 1979)
- Kiera Duffy (born 1979)
- Veronika Dzhioeva (born 1979)
- Arijana Marić Gigliani (born 1979)
- Laura Giordano (born 1979)
- Elza van den Heever (born 1979)
- Maija Kovaļevska (born 1979)
- Tsakane Valentine Maswanganyi (born 1979)
- Pumeza Matshikiza (born 1979)
- Latonia Moore (born 1979)
- Kristine Opolais (born 1979)
- Ailyn Pérez (born 1979)
- Kädy Plaas (born 1979)
- Jessica Pratt (born 1979)
- Chen Reiss (born 1979)
- Kate Royal (born 1979)
- Albina Shagimuratova (born 1979)
- Elizabeth Watts (born 1979)
- Monica Yunus (born 1979)

=== 1980s ===
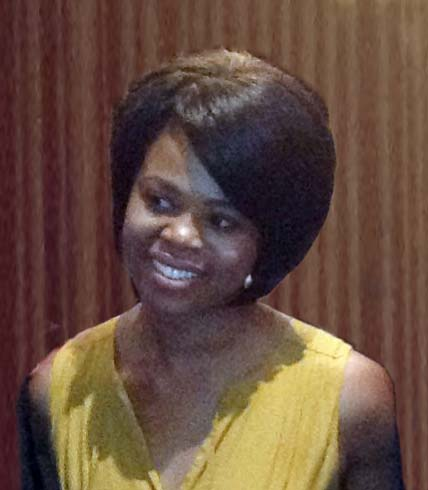
Pretty Yende

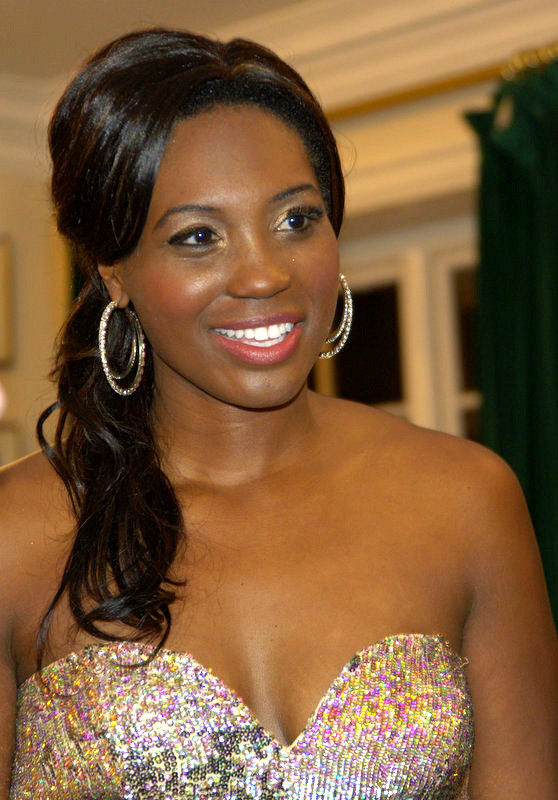
Angel Blue

1980

- Dinara Alieva (born 1980)
- Anja-Nina Bahrmann (born 1980)
- Celine Byrne (born 1980)
- Khori Dastoor (born 1980)
- Ellie Dehn (born 1980)
- Daniela Fally (born 1980)
- Urška Arlič Gololičič (born 1980)
- Wendy Bryn Harmer (born c.1980)
- Sara Hershkowitz (born 1980)
- Rahel Indermaur (born 1980)
- Christiane Karg (born 1980)
- Julia Kleiter (born 1980)
- Katrina Krumpane (born 1980)
- Irina Lungu (born 1980)
- Erin Morley (born 1980)
- Olga Peretyatko (born 1980)
- Marina Rebeka (born 1980)
- Polyna Savridi (born 1980)
- Amber Wagner (born 1980)
- Vittoria Yeo (born 1980)

1981

- Maureen Batt (born 1981)
- Mairead Buicke (born 1981)
- Lisa Lee Dark (born 1981)
- Jeanine De Bique (born 1981)
- Rachele Gilmore (born 1981)
- Tharanga Goonetilleke (born 1981)
- Asmik Grigorian (born 1981)
- Louise Hunter (born 1981)
- Ilona Jokinen (born 1981)
- Anna Kasyan (born 1981)
- Anna Krauja (born 1981)
- Anna Leese (born 1981)
- Kate Miller-Heidke (born 1981)
- Kristel Pärtna (born 1981)
- Susanna Phillips (born 1981)
- Iwona Sobotka (born 1981)
- Ingrid Vetlesen (born 1981)
- Sara Widén (1981–2014)
- Sybille Witkowski (born 1981)
- Sonya Yoncheva (born 1981)
- Dominika Zamara (born 1981)

1982

- Anna Aglatova (born 1982)
- Katrien Baerts (born 1982)
- Eleonora Buratto (born 1982)
- Layla Claire (born 1982)
- Takesha Meshé Kizart (born 1982)
- Mary-Jean O'Doherty (born 1982)
- Micaëla Oeste (born 1982)
- Polina Pasztircsák (born 1982)
- Camille Poul (born 1982)
- Brenda Rae (born 1982)
- Maria Veretenina (born 1982)
- Tamara Wilson (born c. 1982)
- Lauren Worsham (born 1982)

1983

- Sophie Bevan (born 1983)
- Olga Bezsmertna (born 1983)
- Ambur Braid (born 1983)
- Janai Brugger (born 1983)
- Mari Eriksmoen (born 1983)
- Megan Marie Hart (born 1983)
- Anita Hartig (born 1983)
- Saioa Hernández (born 1983)
- Nadine Koutcher (born 1983)
- Jolanta Kowalska (born 1983)
- Kathryn Lewek (born 1983)
- Nino Machaidze (born 1983)
- Julia Novikova (born 1983)
- Lisette Oropesa (born 1983)
- Anna Prohaska (born 1983)
- Golda Schultz (born 1983)
- Natalie Ni Shi (born 1983)
- Charity Sunshine Tillemann-Dick (1983-2019)

1984

- Angel Blue (born 1984)
- Ashley Emerson (born 1984)
- Julie Fuchs (born 1984)
- Venera Gimadieva (born 1984)
- Lauren Jelencovich (born 1984)
- Svetlana Kasyan (born 1984)
- Maria Katzarava (born 1984)
- Amanda Majeski (born 1984)
- Nina Osegueda (born 1984)
- Rachel Willis-Sørensen (born 1984)
- Jennifer Zetlan (born 1984)

1985

- Stacey Alleaume (1985 or 1986)
- Emőke Baráth (born 1985)
- Nicole Car (born 1985)
- Sabine Devieilhe (born 1985)
- Dianne van Giersbergen (born 1985)
- Arete Kerge (born 1985)
- Magda Krysztoforska-Beucher (born 1985)
- Hanna-Elisabeth Müller (born 1985)
- Evelin Novak (born 1985)
- Pretty Yende (born 1985)

1986

- Louise Alder (born 1986)
- Julia Bullock (born 1986)
- Raquel Camarinha (born 1986)
- Rosa Feola (born 1986)
- Alejandra Flores (born 1986)
- Magdalena Hinterdobler (born 1986)
- Sumi Hwang (born 1986)
- Kateryna Kasper (born 1986)
- Alessandra Marianelli (born 1986)
- Regula Mühlemann (born 1986)
- Emmy Rossum (born 1986)
- Elena Stikhina (born 1986)
- Eleonora Vindau (born 1986)

1987

- Gan-ya Ben-gur Akselrod (born 1987)
- Chloé Briot (born 1987)
- Becca Conviser (born 1987)
- Marina Costa-Jackson (born 1987)
- Iulia Maria Dan (born 1987)
- Lise Davidsen (born 1987)
- Sydney Mancasola (born 1987)
- Valentina Nafornița (born 1987)
- Simone Osborne (born 1987)
- Cristina Pasaroiu (born 1987)
- Siobhan Stagg (born 1987)
- Tuuli Takala (born 1987)
- Olena Tokar (born 1987)
- Adela Zaharia (born 1987)

1988

- Vlada Borovko (born 1988)
- Jodie Devos (1988–2024)
- Ying Fang (born 1988)
- Tereza Gevorgyan (born 1988)
- Katharina Konradi (born 1988)
- Zuzana Marková (born 1988)
- Hera Hyesang Park (born 1988)
- Nadine Sierra (born 1988)

1989

- Farrah Eldibany (born 1989)
- Dilyara Idrisova (born 1989)
- Julia Lezhneva (born 1989)
- Federica Lombardi (born 1989)
- Marie Perbost (born 1989)

=== 1990s ===
- Andrea Carroll (born c. 1990)
- Esther Dierkes (born 1990)
- Heather Engebretson (born 1990)
- Alexandra Flood (born 1990)
- Christina Gansch (born 1990)
- Margarita Levchuk (born 1990)
- Mélissa Petit (born 1990)
- Sarah Aristidou (born 1991)
- Elsa Dreisig (born 1991)
- Amina Edris (born 1991)
- Adriana González (born 1991)
- Fatma Said (born 1991)
- Joanna Wos (born 1991)
- Monika Buczkowska (born 1992)
- Isabelle Cals (born 1993)
- Masabane Cecilia Rangwanasha (born 1993)
- Johanna Wallroth (born 1993)
- Maria Mudryak (born 1994)
- Madison Nonoa (born 1994)
- Natasha Wilson (born 1994)
- Anna Nekhames (born 1995)
- Lidia Fridman (born 1996)
- Emily Pogorelc (born 1996)

== See also ==
- List of operatic contraltos
