= Sängerfest =

Germanic musical competitions

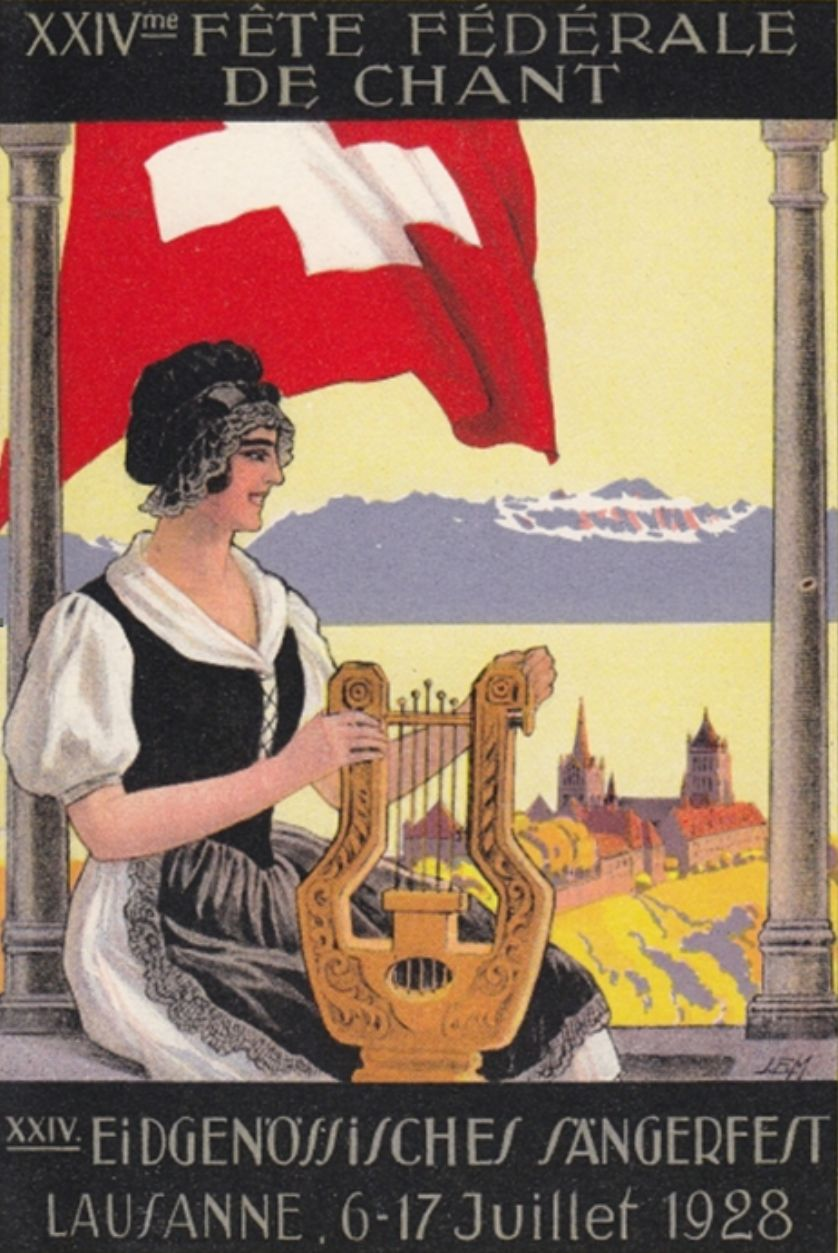
Postcard of the 1928 Lausanne Sängerfest

Sängerfest, also Sängerbund-Fest, Sängerfeste, or Saengerfest, meaning singer festival, is a competition of Sängerbunds, or singer groups, with prizes for the best group or groups. Such public events are also known as a Liederfest, or song festival. Participants number in the hundreds and thousands, and the fest is usually accompanied by a parade and other celebratory events. The sängerfest is most associated with the Germanic culture. Its origins can be traced back to 19th century Europe. Swiss composer Hans Georg Nägeli and educator Carl Friedrich Zelter, both protégés of Swiss educator Johann Heinrich Pestalozzi, established sängerbunds to help foster social change throughout Germany and Prussia. University students began to choose the art form as an avenue for political statements. As the sängerfest concept gained popularity and spread around the world, it was adapted by Christian churches for spiritual worship services. European immigrants brought the tradition in a non-political form to the North American continent. In the early part of the 20th century, sängerfest celebrations drew devotees in the tens of thousands, and included some United States presidents among their audiences. Sängerbunds are still active in Europe and in American communities with Germanic heritage.

== History ==
=== Europe ===
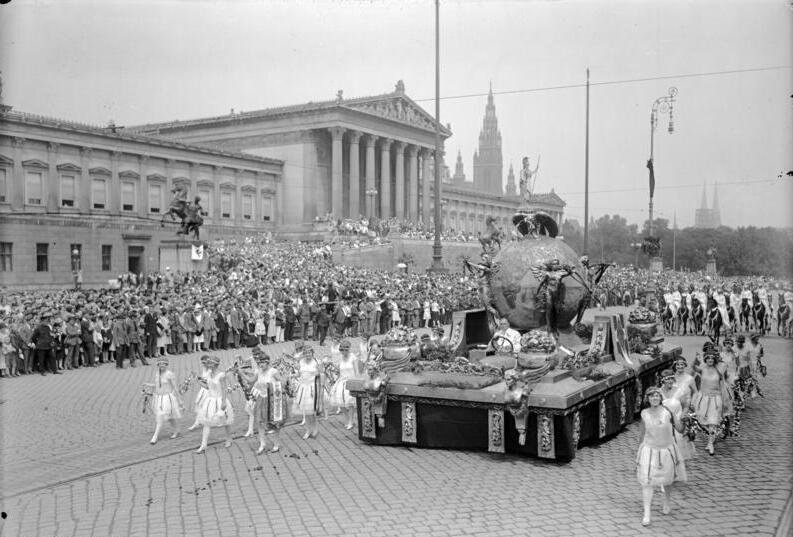
Sängerfest 1928 in Vienna

Students of Swiss educator Johann Heinrich Pestalozzi, a proponent of social reform, applied his teachings when founding some singing groups as an instrument for cultural change. One of his students was Carl Friedrich Zelter, who helped establish the sängerbund movement throughout Prussia in 1809. Pestalozzi's protégé Hans Georg Nägeli was a composer, music teacher and songbook publisher who made numerous journeys across Germany from 1819 to encourage the formation of male singing groups for social reform. Nägeli established several sängerbunds in Switzerland, which became the inspiration for the 1824 establishment of the Stuttgarter Liederkranz. Following the 1819 Carlsbad Decrees in Germany, male-only choral celebrations with hundreds or thousands of vocalists were popular with the masses and often part of political events.

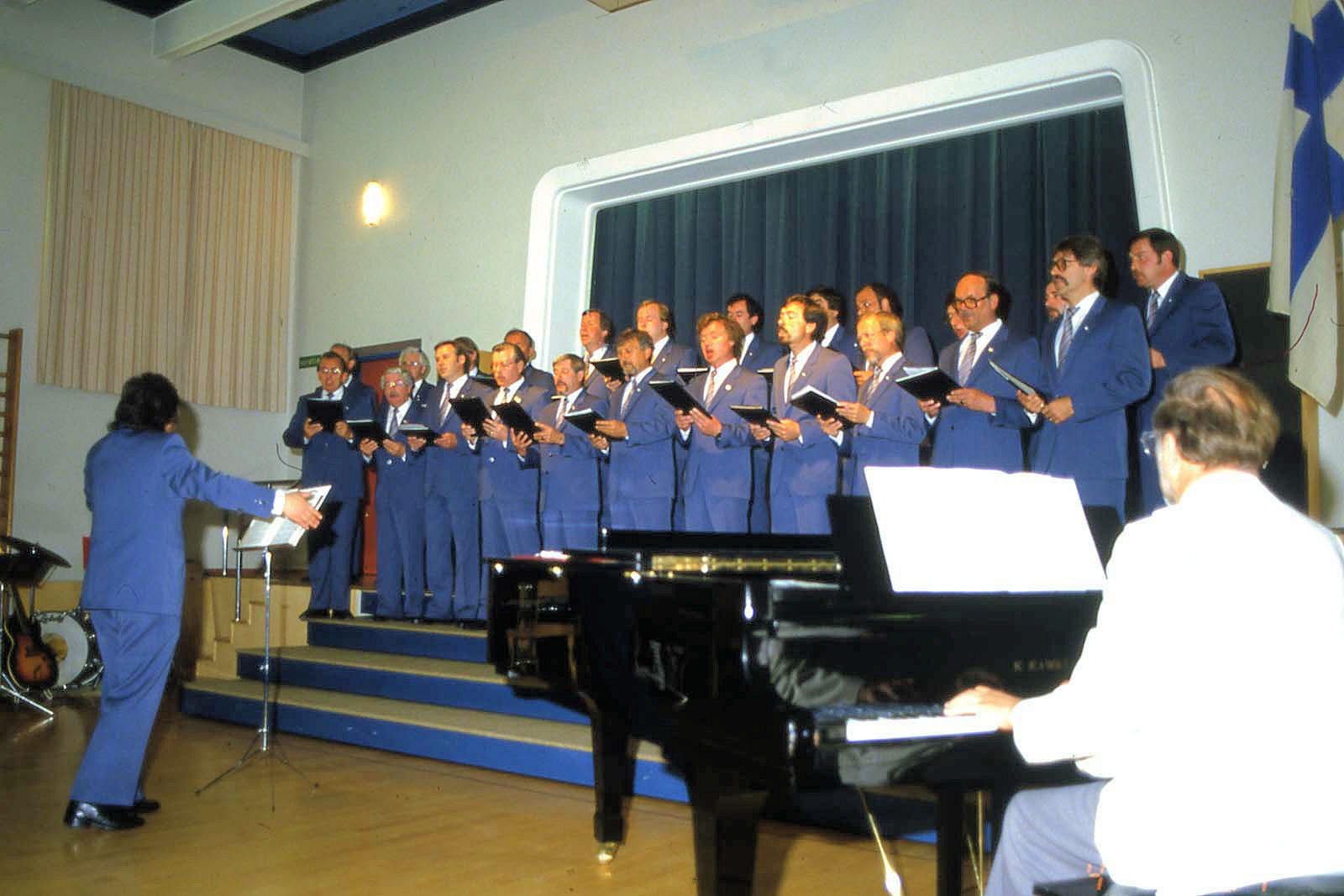
Liederkranz Quartettverein from Velbert Germany

Composer Friedrich Silcher was directly influenced by Pestalozzi and Nägeli. He began using large choirs to express political viewpoints at least as early as 1824 when he and a group of Tübingen University students performed La Marseillaise to commemorate the storming of the Bastille. In 1827 at Plochingen, Baden-Württemberg, several male-voiced choirs combined for a regional liederfest. Sängerfests were part of the Hambach Festival of 1832.

Christian church organizations known as Christlicher sängerbunds adapted the sängerfest for religious gatherings and helped spread its popularity throughout Europe, North America and Australia. They became popular in late 19th century Russia among Mennonite congregations. On 30 May 1893, a sängerfest of seven choirs was held in Rückenau in Molotschna, Ukraine. On Sunday, 29 May 1894, the all-day Russische Saengervereinigung was held in Rückenau under the direction of Polish conductor Friedrich Schweige with assistance from Aron Gerhard Sawatsky, director of the Andreasfeld Mennonite Brethren Church. Beginning on 3 May, Schweiger traveled across Russia rehearsing choirs. On 29 May there were breakfasts for attendees, an estimated 50 vocal presentations by individual choirs, prayer services and sermons, lunch for 2,000 people and afternoon snacks.

=== North America ===
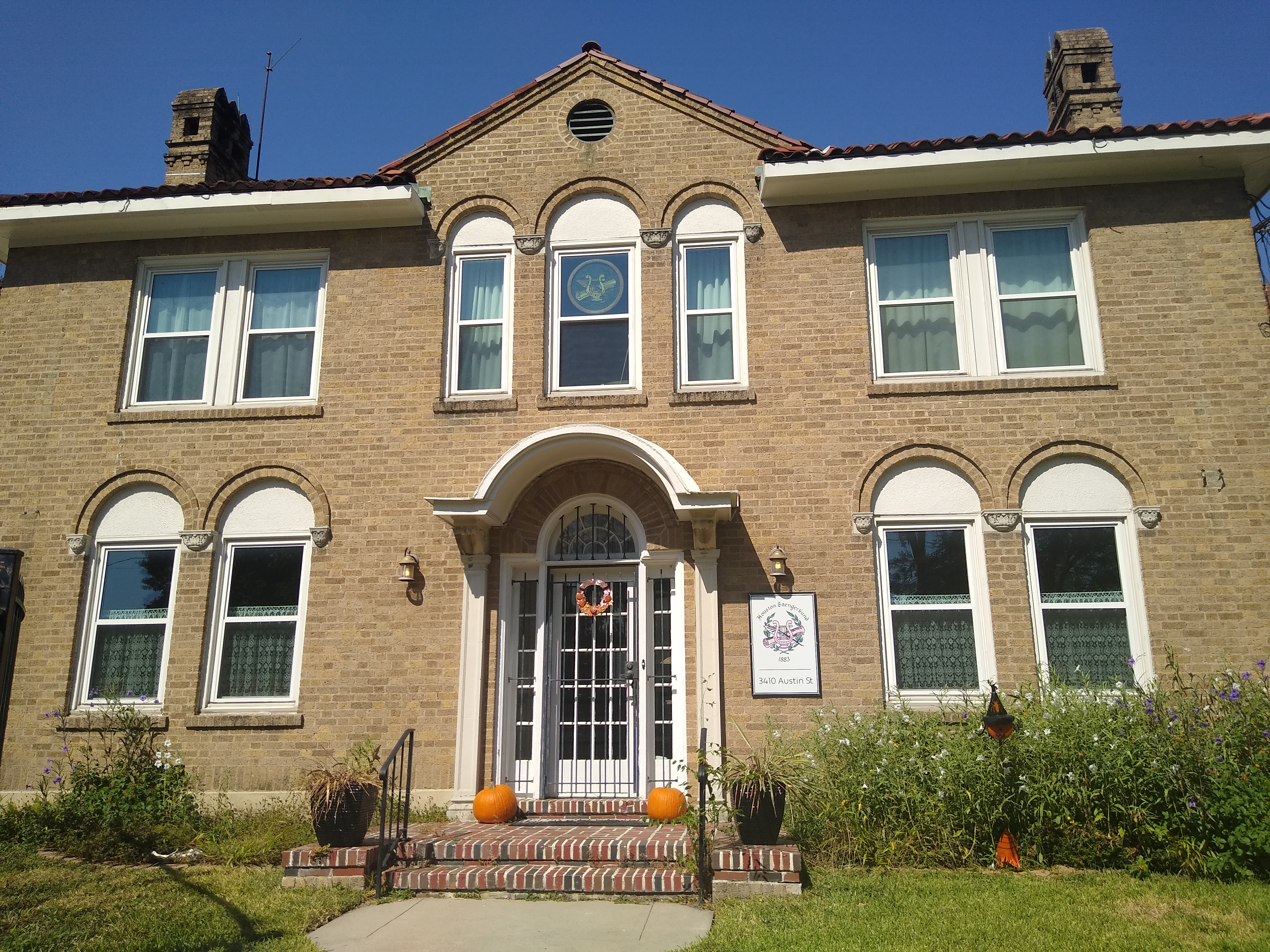
Houston Saengerbund of the First Lutheran Church in Midtown, Houston

Mennonites established the northwest Philadelphia section of Germantown in 1683. The Philadelphia Männerchor founded by German immigrant Phillip Matthias Wohlseiffer in 1835 was the first German-American singing society organized in the United States where the sängerfest began to evolve as a form of civic entertainment. In 1836, Wohlseiffer founded the Baltimore Liederkranz, which became the first to accept women members (1838). In 1846, the Philadelphia, Pennsylvania, group and the Baltimore, Maryland, group performed together at a public sängerfest. The "Brooklyn Daily Eagle Almanac" of 1891 listed numerous sängerbunds in the Brooklyn, New York area. On 21 June 1901, the Nord-Amerikanischer Sängerbund presented a sängerfest in Buffalo, New York, at the famous Pan-American Exposition (where 25th President William McKinley was shot by Leon Czolgosz in a reception line in September 1901). A group in Buffalo hoped to help pay the expenses of the fest by forming the Buffalo Sängerfest Company, selling 1,600 shares of stock at $25 each.

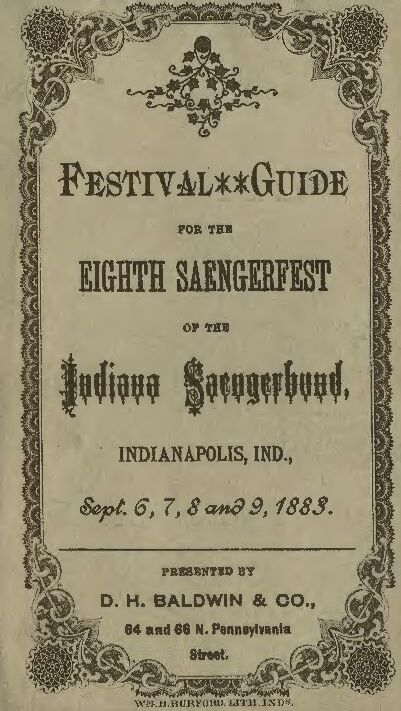
Festival Guide for the Eighth Saengerfest of the Indiana Saengerbund (September 1883)

In 1838, the Cincinnati Deutscher Gesangverein was formed in Ohio, followed by the Cincinnati Deutsch Liedertafel in 1844. The Gesang und Bildungsverein Deutscher Arbeiter formed in 1846 and was the first Cincinnati group that allowed women. Groups from Ohio, Kentucky, Maryland and Indiana created the Nord-Amerikanischer Sängerbund in 1849 for a sängerfest hosted by Cincinnati, featuring the music of German composers. By 1908, it was estimated that 250,000 German Americans belonged to musical organizations, and 50,000 of those belonged to the Nord-Amerikanischer Sängerbund. The first post-Civil War sängerfest in Columbus, Ohio, took place 29 August – 1 September 1865 at Schreiner's Hall and the Opera House. Each arriving sängerbund was escorted to the hall by the Eighteenth regiment of the United States Infantry. There were an estimated 400 singers entertaining 12,000 to 15,000 attendees. The closing day was celebrated with pomp and circumstance.

The first sängerfest in Texas was held in 1853 in New Braunfels, and was held annually until 1860 when conflicting loyalties about, and participation in, the American Civil War caused a 10-year gap in the events. The San Antonio Männergesang-Verein was formed in 1847, the New Braunfels Gesangverein Germania formed in 1850, and the Austin Männerchor formed in 1852. On 4 July 1853 in San Antonio, the San Antonio Männergesang-Verein sponsored an Independence Day celebration attended by the New Braunfels Gesangverein and the Austin Männerchor. The New Braunfels Gesangverein invited everyone to meet in New Braunfels on 16–17 October 1853 for its first Texas Sängerfest. In 1854, the aggregate sängerbunds formed the Texas State Sängerbund. The San Antonio Beethoven Männerchor was organized in 1867 by Wilhelm Thielepape, assistant conductor of the San Antonio Männergesang-Verein. After the surrender of the Confederacy in 1865, Thielepape raised the Union flag of the "Stars and Stripes" over the historic Texan battle site and former church mission, the Alamo in San Antonio and distributed wine and songbooks. The all-male Houston Sängerbund was founded on 6 October 1883 and chartered in 1890. It affiliated itself with Der Deutsch-Texanische Sängerbund. In 1887, founding member Carl C. Zeus served as principal of the organization's German-English school.

22nd and 24th President Grover Cleveland, his wife, and guests took a special train from Washington, D.C. on "Independence Day", 4 July 1888, forty miles northeast to see a Baltimore event. Cleveland had friends who were members of the sängerbunds. 27th President William Howard Taft attended the 1 July 1912 event in Philadelphia. On 15 June 1903, 26th President Theodore Roosevelt and Ambassador Herman Speck von Sternberg attended a sängerfest of 6,000 individual singers at Baltimore's Armory Hall. All 9,000 seats were sold out. President Roosevelt delivered an address praising the German culture and the sängerfest tradition. The Northeastern Sängerbund presented selections by composers Herman Spielter, David Melamet, Carl Friedrich Zöllner, E.S. Engelsberg, Felix Mendelssohn and Richard Wagner.

When Newark, New Jersey, hosted the 21st National Sängerfest, held on 1–4 July 1906 in Olympic Park, 25,000 people showed up to hear the music, many arriving on chartered trains. Only a few thousand were able to get into the hall, and 2,000 were standing. Five thousand singers from more than a hundred sängerbunds representing forty cities from New Jersey, New York, Maryland, Pennsylvania, and Delaware competed for a $20,000 prize offered by Kaiser Wilhelm II. Park vendors offered souvenirs, refreshments, games, and a carousel.

Germans began emigrating to Canada through Nova Scotia, where they helped found the town of Lunenburg in 1753. The sängerfests were first performed in Kitchener, Ontario, in 1862. The community events included the standard concerts and meals, with drama presentations and athletic entertainment sponsored by the local Turnvereine clubs. For the next 40 years, sängerbunds and sängerfests spread throughout Ontario. Pennsylvania Mennonites began settling in Ontario in the late 19th century. Alberta and Saskatchewan host annual Mennonite sängerfestes.

In 1916 at his sentencing for bigamy, Count Max Lymer Louden related another misdeed from his past. Louden claimed he had been hired by a group of wealthy German Americans with a secret fund of $16,000,000 to take 150,000 German reservists, disguised as sängerbunds, across the Canada–United States border for a coup d'état of Canada, on behalf of Kaiser Wilhelm II. If they drew suspicion, they were prepared to "sing at a moment's notice." It was his loyalty to America, he claimed, which caused him to desert the Kaiser's singing invasion force.

== Current events ==
Although some local festivals were canceled or suspended during the World Wars owing to rising anti-German sentiment, the triennial Sängerfest tradition has largely survived and many communities in areas with a significant German-American population have Sängerfests today.

Two major German-American singing associations are the Nordöstlicher (North Eastern) Sängerbund and the much larger Nord-Amerikanischer (North American) Sängerbund.

- Nordöstlicher Sängerbund: The 49th Sängerfest was in Lancaster, Pennsylvania, in 2006. The 50th Sängerfest, hosted by the Washington Sängerbund, took place on the 2009 Memorial Day Weekend in Washington, D.C. The 51st Sängerfest, hosted by the Lehigh Sängerbund, took place in June 2012 in Allentown, Pennsylvania. The Bloomfield Liedertafel hosted the 52nd Sängerfest in 2015 in Pittsburgh, PA.
- Nord-Amerikanischer Sängerbund: The 61st Sängerfest of the Nord-Amerikanischer Sängerbund was June 2013 in Milwaukee, Wisconsin with over 1300 singers. The 62nd Sängerfest took place 27–29 May 2016 in Pittsburgh, PA.

== Gallery ==
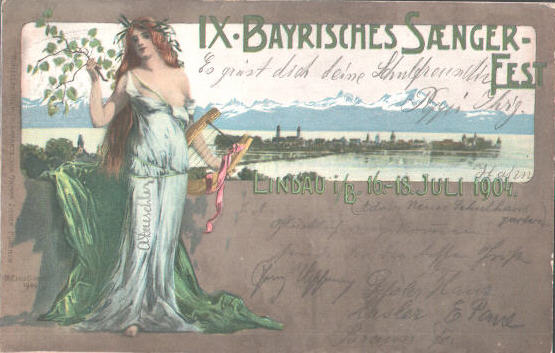

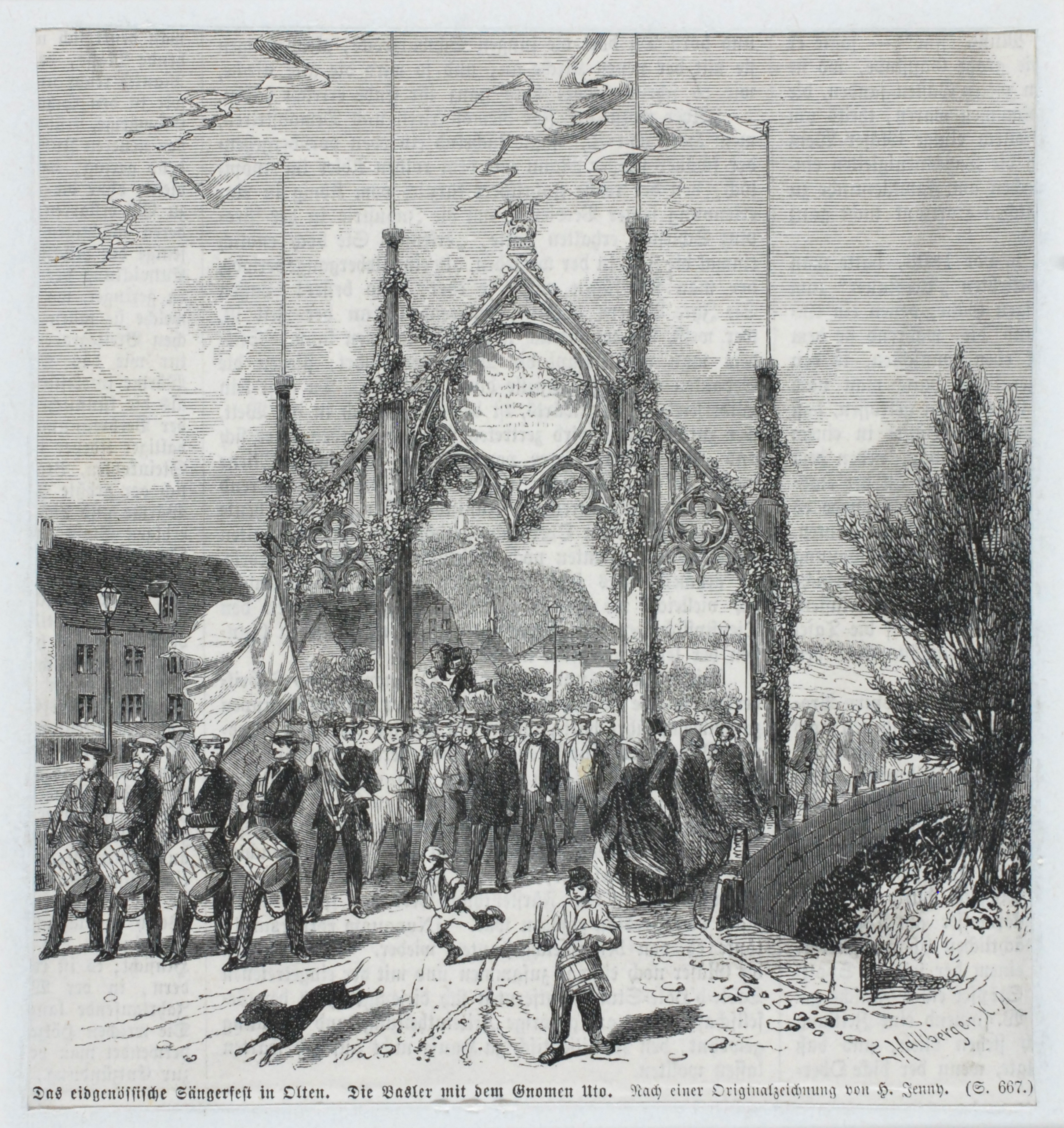

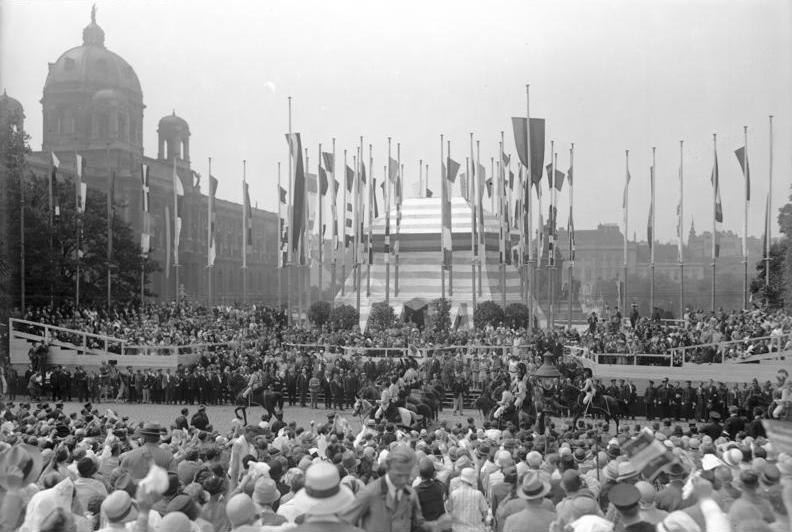

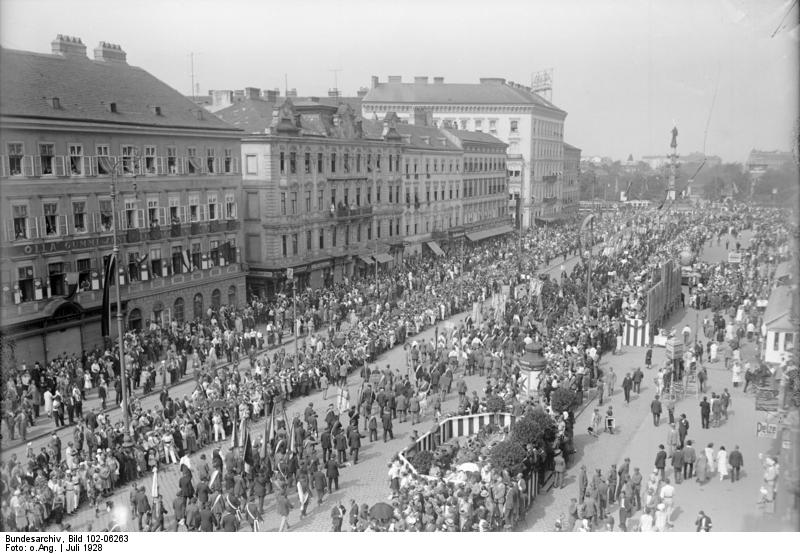

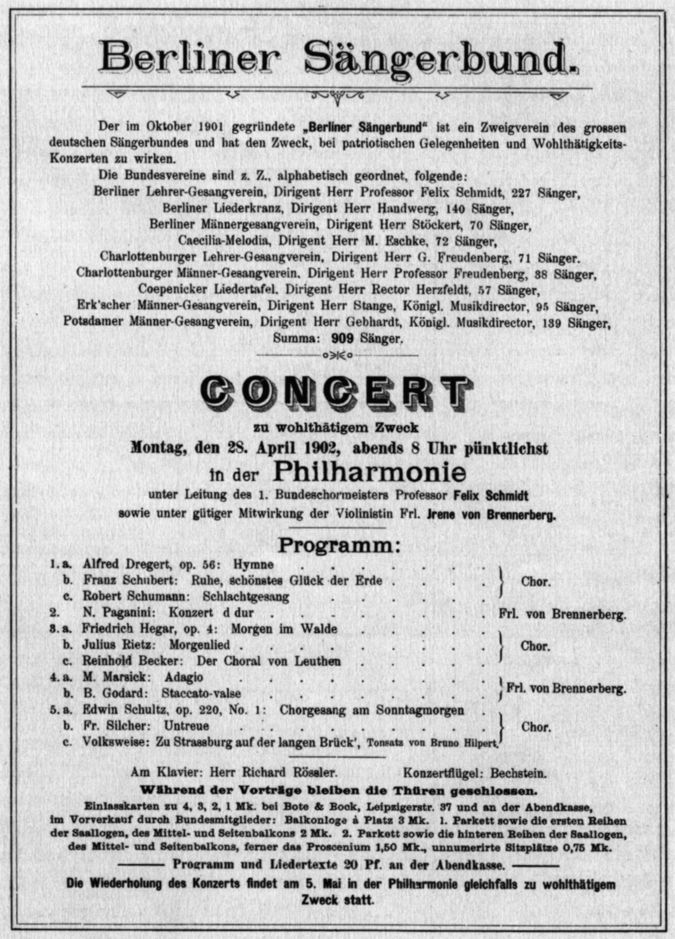

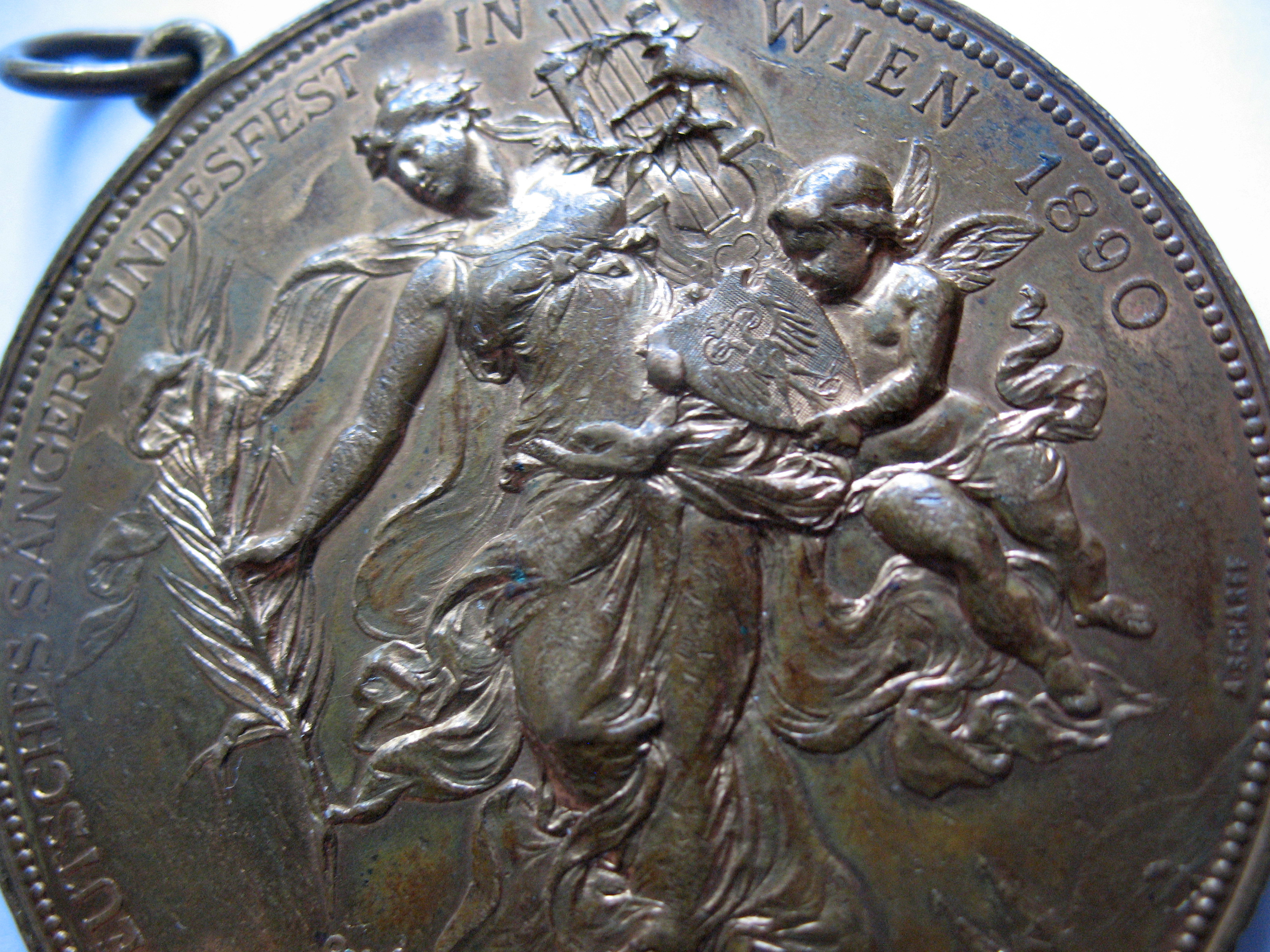
Medaille – Deutsches Sängerbundesfest in Wien 1890 – von A. Scharff

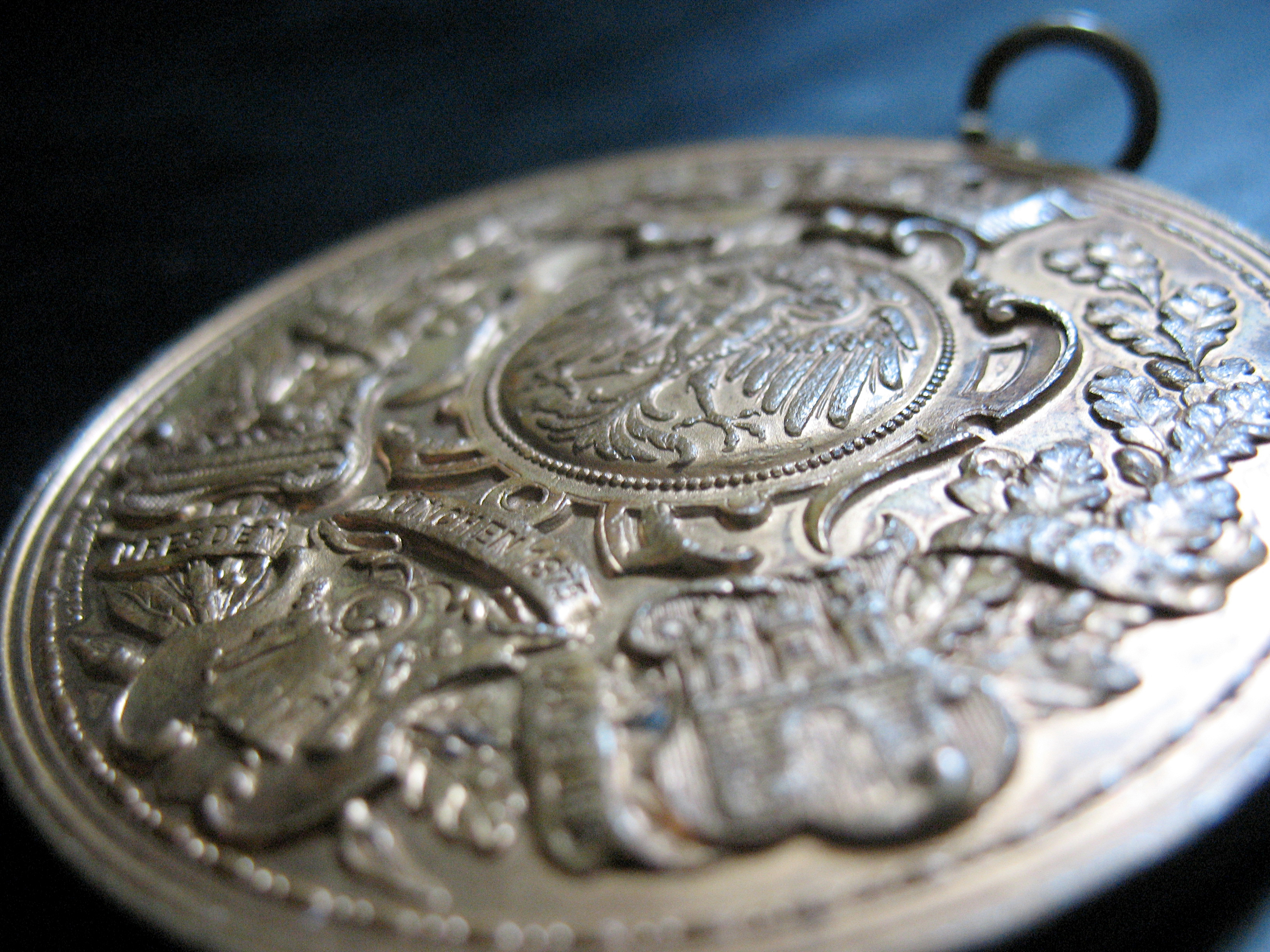
Medaille – Deutsches Sängerbundesfest in Wien 1890 – von J. Schwerdtner

== See also ==
- Saengerfest Halle
- Saengerfest Park
