= Olga von Türk-Rohn =

Austrian soprano and voice teacher (1865–1940)

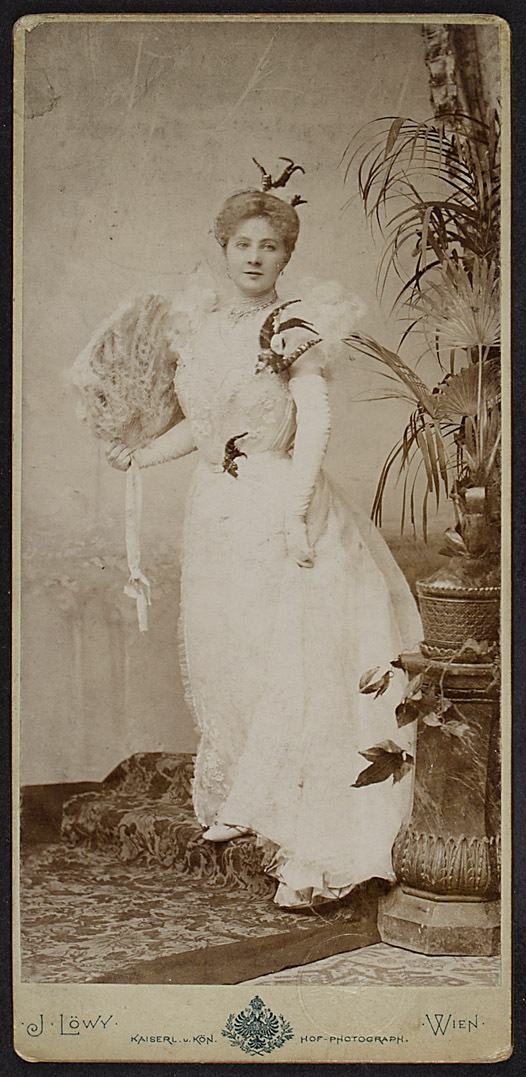
Türk-Rohn in 1890

Olga von Türk-Rohn, also known by her title through marriage as Baroness von Türk-Rohn and by her maiden name Baroness Olga von Rohn (3 June 1865 – 26 February 1940), was an Austrian soprano and voice teacher. She began her career as a concert soprano in 1887 and then worked as an opera singer in Graz from 1888 to 1890. She also sang in one opera with the Vienna State Opera before her marriage to Baron Camillo von Türk in either 1891 or 1897.

After marrying, Türk-Rohn stopped performing in operas, but continued to be a celebrated concert soprano in Europe from the 1890s to the early 1910s. She drew particular acclaim for her performances in oratorios and German lieder. Türk-Rohn was regarded as a leading interpreter of the works of Franz Schubert, a distinction that was acknowledged through several honors, including the Franz Schubert Silver Medal. Her voice from this period is preserved on several recordings she made in Vienna and in Germany from 1905 to 1907. She also taught on the voice faculties of two music schools in Vienna: the Lutwak-Patonay-Konservatorium and the Neues Wiener Konservatorium.

In 1913 Türk-Rohn immigrated with her family to the United States after receiving a contract to perform in operas with a company managed by Oscar Hammerstein I. The planned opera performances never materialized, but Türk-Rohn performed in concerts and recitals in the United States beginning in late 1913. World War I interrupted her performance career. She was living in New York City in 1923 when she relocated to Chicago to join the faculty of Esther Harris's Chicago College of Music. She remained in Chicago for the rest of her professional life, working as a voice teacher both privately and for a variety of different music schools in that city. She ended her teaching career as dean of the vocal department of The Chicago Conservatory College in the mid-1930s. She was also active as a recitalist, concert and radio singer, and conductor while living in Chicago during the 1920s and 1930s. She moved back to New York City late in her life, dying there in 1940.

== Early life and opera career ==
Born Olga Carolina Ludovika von Rohn in Vienna on 3 June 1865, Türk-Rohn was the daughter of Baron Robert von Rohn (also given as Rohnau) and Carolina Anna Tyll. She was encouraged to pursue vocal training and a career as a singer by Mathilde Marchesi who heard her sing at the age of fifteen. Some sources claim her first lessons were with Marchesi at this age, and others that she did not begin her training until later under other teachers.

Türk-Rohn pursued a singing career against the wishes of her parents. She trained as a soprano under the instruction of opera singer Ida Liebhardt-Baier in her native city. She began her career on the concert stage in 1887, and in 1888 made her opera debut at the Stadttheater Graz (the predecessor to the Graz Opera). She was a resident artist at that theatre for two years. She starred in Weber's Der Freischütz at the Vienna State Opera (VSO) in 1888 under conductor Wilhelm Jahn. Despite Jahn's efforts to persuade the directors of the VSO to hire Türk-Rohn for further engagements, she was not offered another contract with the company.

== Marriage and career as a concert soprano in Europe ==
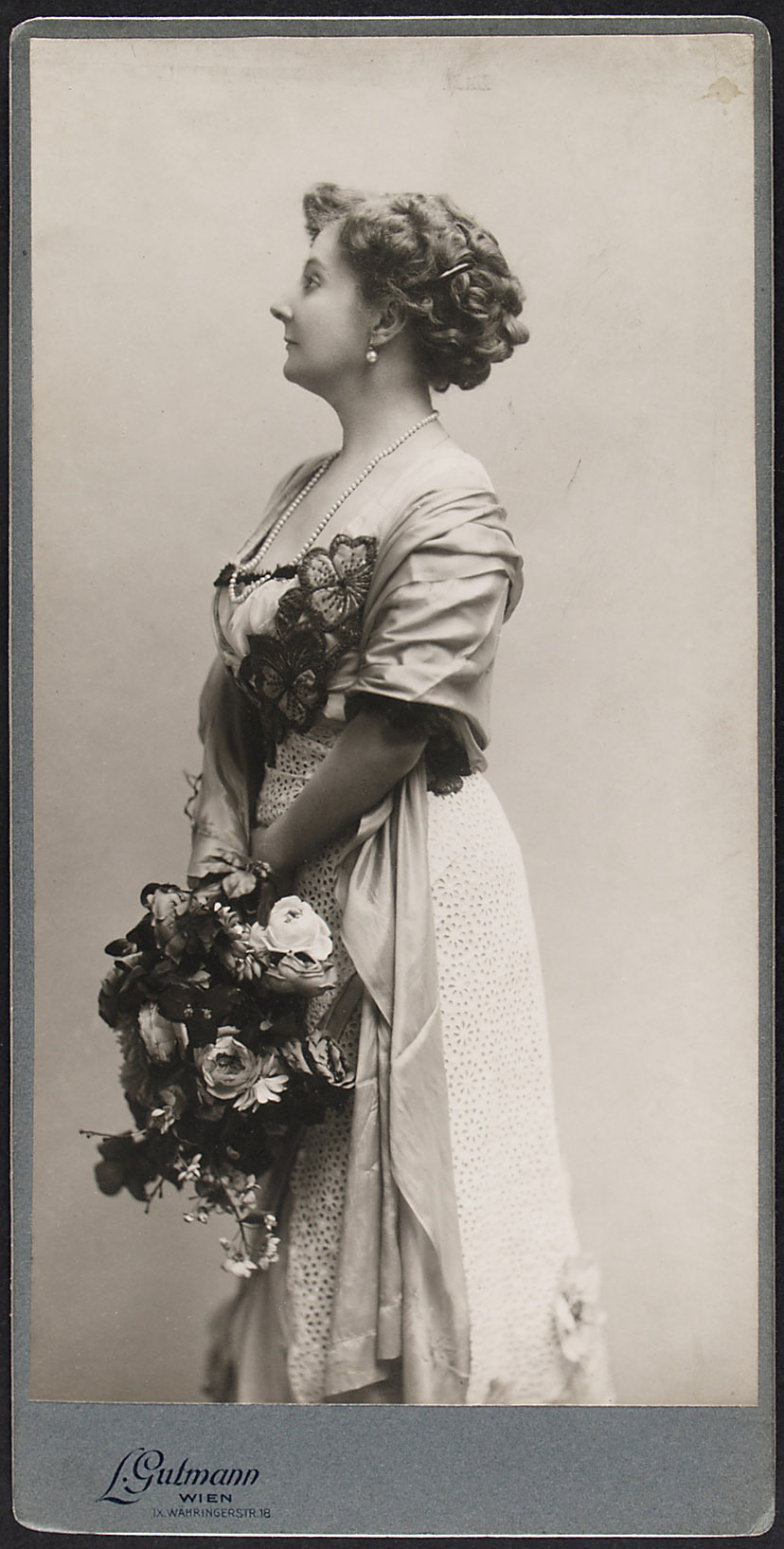
Photograph of Olga von Türk-Rohn c. 1905–1913

Olga retired from the opera stage upon her marriage to Baron Camillo Franz Johann Türk Edler von Karlovacgrad who was State Attorney of Austria at the time of their wedding. Some sources claim their marriage took place in Vienna on 6 October 1891, and others that they were married in 1897. The couple had three daughters together: Elvira, Hertha (sometimes given as Bertha in the American press), and Maude. The Oesterreichisches Musiklexikon claims that the couple divorced a few years after their marriage and that her husband's year of death is unknown. However, this account is contradicted in Türk-Rohn's 1940 obituary in The New York Times which states the couple were still married when Türk-Rohn moved to the United States in 1913. This publication indicates that the baron lived with his wife and their three daughters in the United States until the baron's death in that country in 1926.

After ceasing opera performance, Türk-Rohn continued to perform as a concert soprano. She studied singing in Vienna with Leo Friedrich and Gustav Walter, focusing particularly on lieder with the latter teacher. Her singing drew the admiration of both composer Johannes Brahms and Austrian music critic Eduard Hanslick whose praise did much to further her career as a concert soprano in Austria during the 1890s. The remainder of her singing career was mainly dedicated to the performance of lieder, oratorio, and other sacred vocal works, and she performed internationally in that repertoire from the 1890s until World War I. In addition to performing lieder by Brahms with the composer's support and attendance, Türk-Rohn's repertoire also encompassed lieder by Franz Schubert, Robert Schumann, Hugo Wolf, Richard Strauss, Wilhelm Kienzl, Gustav Mahler, and Edvard Grieg among other composers.

On 18 April 1895 Türk-Rohn was the soprano soloist in the world premiere of Johann Strauss II's waltz for voice and orchestra Klug Gretelein, Op.462 at the Musikverein. The concert was organized by the Gesellschaft der Musikfreunde in celebration of the 25th anniversary of Musikverein, and featured conductor Eduard Strauss leading the Strauss Orchestra. The orchestra and Türk-Rohn's performance of the work was heavily applauded at the premiere, and the work was repeated at the audience's behest.

Türk-Rohn was an early champion of composer Robert Winterberg, and, along with baritone Joseph Schwarz, was one of the soloists in the very first professional concert of his music at Ehrbar Saal (English: Ehrbar Hall) inside the Palais Ehrbar. In 1906 Türk-Rohn and Winterberg were invited to Peleș Castle in Sinaia by Elisabeth of Romania where they gave a concert of Winterberg's music for the queen. She also developed a close working relationship with Czech composer Rudolf Procházka (1864–1936), and performed his Das Glück in concerts in Vienna, Prague and Pilsen.

In the early 20th century Türk-Rohn gave concert tours in Austria, Germany, and Italy in which her repertoire consisted of lieder, opera arias, and religious vocal works. She gave performances at the Theater an der Wien in 1896, 1900, and 1903, and performed at the Tyrolean State Theatre in Innsbruck in 1903. In 1910 she sang at the Stadttheater, Hamburg. She also taught singing briefly on the faculty of the Lutwak-Patonay-Konservatorium before joining the voice faculty of the Neues Wiener Konservatorium in 1909.

Türk-Rohn gained a reputation as one of the finest interpreters of lieder written by Schubert. The city of Jablonec nad Nisou completed a monument to Schubert in 1900 which included a statue of Türk-Rohn in which she was depicted as one of the singing muses for the composer. In 1901 she was awarded a gold medal from the Vienna Schubert Society, and in 1912 she was awarded the Franz Schubert Silver Medal by the combined Schubert Singing Societies of Vienna. She was the recipient of honors from Franz Joseph I of Austria, Carol I of Romania, Ferdinand I of Bulgaria, and Mohammad Ali Shah Qajar, the Shah of Persia. She also was awarded the Salvator gold medal by the city of Vienna in 1901 in recognition of her performances in many concerts for charity in the city. She made several recordings of lieder by Schubert, Brahms, and other composers with various Viennese record labels and the German record label Odeon Records from 1905 to 1907. She also recorded Johann Strauss II's Voices of Spring.

== Later life and career in the United States ==
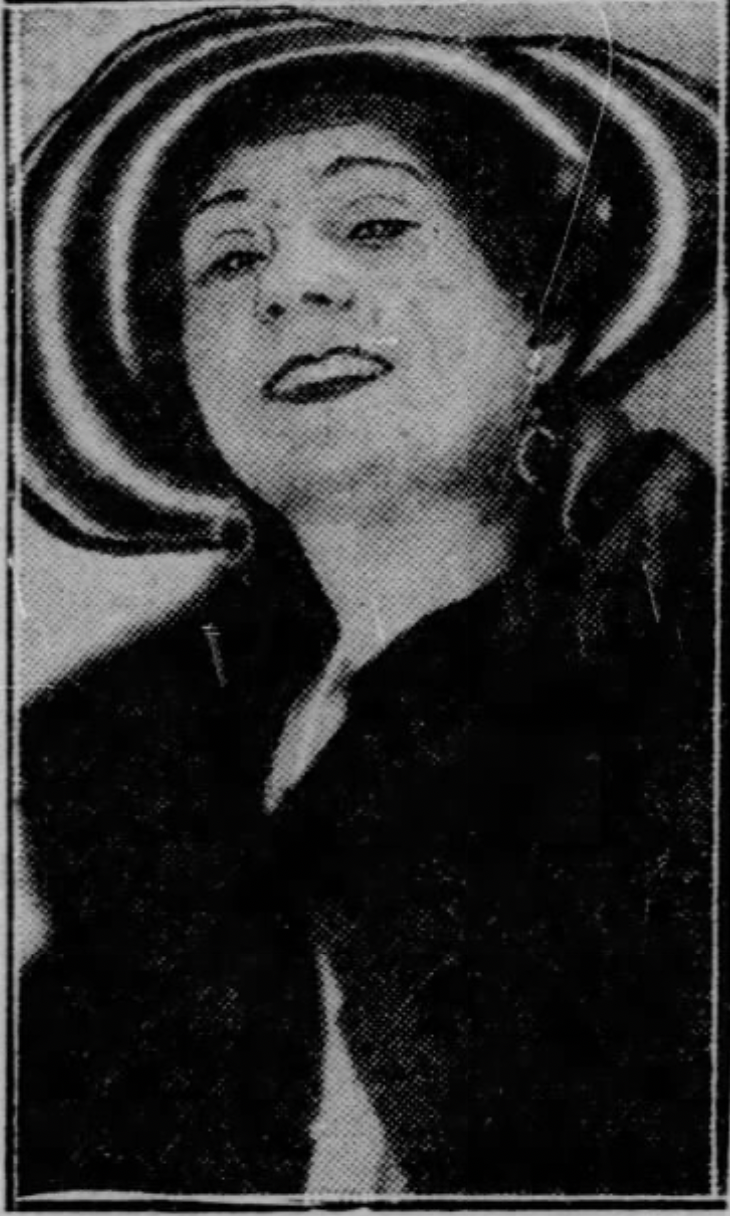
Photograph of Olga von Türk-Rohn published in the Chicago Tribune on 25 June 1925.

In 1913 Türk-Rohn immigrated to the United States with her family to join the roster of artists in Oscar Hammerstein I's opera company. The plans for her appearance with the opera company never materialized. She gave a concert at Cooper Union in Lower Manhattan with violinist Alexander Saslavsky and pianist Leopold Rovenger on 13 November 1913. In February 1914 she performed in concert with the French harpist Carlos Salzedo at Brunswick Hall in Brunswick, New Jersey, and the following month performed in a concert of German music sponsored by Wanamaker's at Egyptian Hall, Masonic Temple in Philadelphia. She then embarked on a lengthy concert tour of the United States. This tour was interrupted by World War I, and her performance career mainly ceased. Herman Spielter served as her accompanist during many of her recitals in the United States in 1914.

Türk-Rohn's daughter, Hertha Türk-Rohn, was also a concert and opera singer. Hertha married Russian-born bass-baritone and voice teacher Reinhold von Warlich in 1923. At the time of their marriage, Olga von Türk-Rohn was living in New York City at 52 W 37th Street. Later that year, both she and conductor Ernst Knoch were visiting instructors at Esther Harris's Chicago College of Music (CCM), and it was announced at the end of this visit in December 1923 that Türk-Rohn had joined the voice faculty of Harris's school. A 1926 review of a student recital program stated that the concert included performances from all fifty-five of Türk-Rohn's voice students at the CCM. A 1927 advertisement for the school in The Reform Advocate listed her as the head of the voice program of the CCM.

By December 1925, Türk-Rohn was also working as a private voice teacher in Chicago with a studio located at the Congress Plaza Hotel. A June 1928 advertisement for her private studio indicates that it was then located at the Kimball Building (now the Lewis Center at Depaul University). By early 1932 at the latest she had joined the voice faculty of the Bush Conservatory of Music in Chicago. In August 1932 the school merged with The Chicago Conservatory College. She ended her teaching career as the dean of the vocal department of this school in the mid-1930s.

After relocating to Chicago, Türk-Rohn resumed performing on a periodic basis. She gave a recital at Kimball Hall inside the Kimball Building in Chicago on 13 November 1924. By 1925 she had founded her own opera chorus for which she conducted performances from the Drake Hotel for radio broadcasts on WGN (AM) in June, November, and December 1925. In November 1925 she sang in concert with the Gordon String Quartet at Orchestra Hall, Symphony Center, and later sang a concert broadcast on WLS (AM) with The Little Symphony of Chicago on 27 November 1925.

In April 1926 Türk-Rohn performed a program of songs broadcast on WMAQ radio (now WKQX). In 1927 her opera ensemble performed a benefit concert at Kimball Hall to raise money for wounded United States veterans and the Edward Hines Jr. Veterans Administration Hospital. In 1929 she was the assistant music director for a Passion Play staged at the Auditorium Building. In 1935 she conducted a concert of grand opera at the Chicago Commons auditorium. In 1936 she sang at a "peace meeting" in New Brunswick, New Jersey, reuniting with Herman Spielter as her pianist, and also sang with an orchestra led by conductor Fred Hart. The meeting was organized by New Brunswick's mayor Austin Scott. In 1937 she was a judge for The New Jersey Federation of Music Clubs music competition.

At the end of her life, Türk-Rohn lived in New York City where she made her home at 32 E 36th Street. She died there on 26 February 1940. Her daughter Maud was listed as the executor of her estate and her cause of death named as general arteriosclerosis coronary sclerosis. That same record stated she was buried at Tresh Paul Cemetery.
