= Robert Winterberg =

Austrian composer (1884–1930)

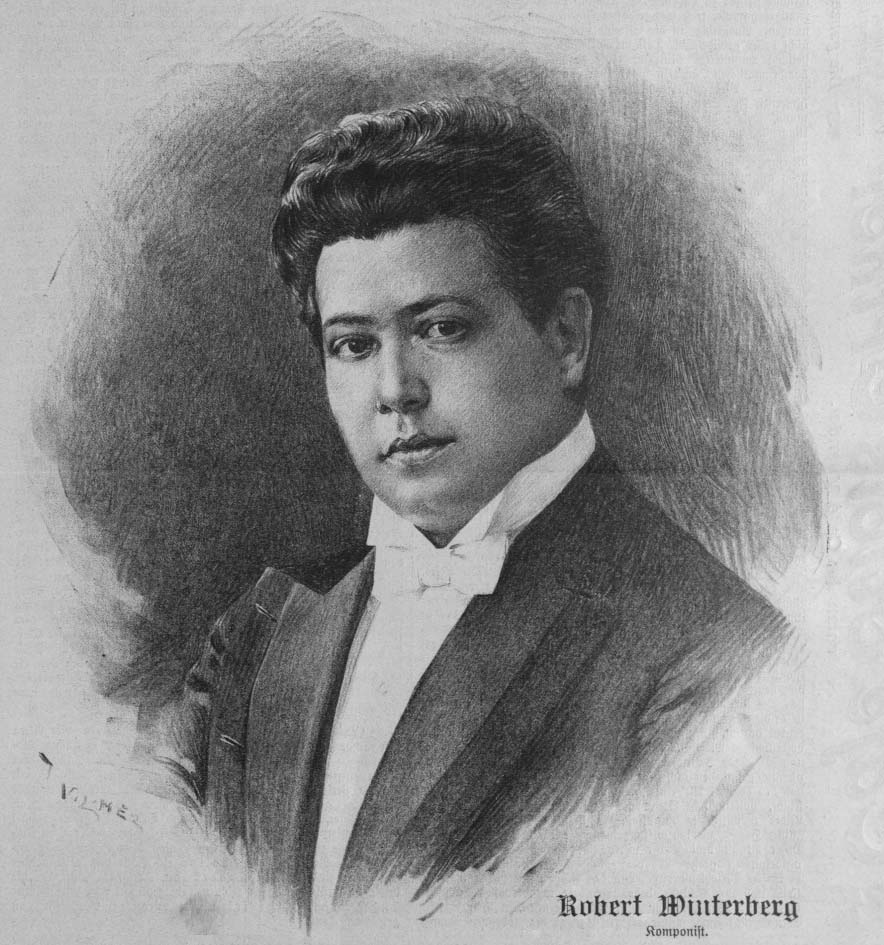
- Winterberg by Jan Vilímek, 1911
- Born: 27 February 1884; Vienna, Austria
- Died: 22 June 1930 (aged 46); Töpchin, Brandenburg, Germany
- Occupations: Pianist; Conductor; Composer
- Known for: Die Dame in Rot

Robert Anton Winterberg (27 February 1884 – 22 June 1930) was an Austrian composer, conductor, pianist, and theatre director. He is best known as a composer of German-language operettas, most of which he created during the 1910s and 1920s. Two of his operettas were adapted into English for Broadway: Die Dame in Rot (1911, Vienna) as The Lady in Red (1919, Lyric Theatre) and Die schöne Schwedin (1915, Vienna) as The Girl from Brazil (1916, 44th Street Theatre). His most successful operettas in Europe were Die Dame vom Zirkus (1919) and Günstling der Zarin (1921).

== Life and career ==
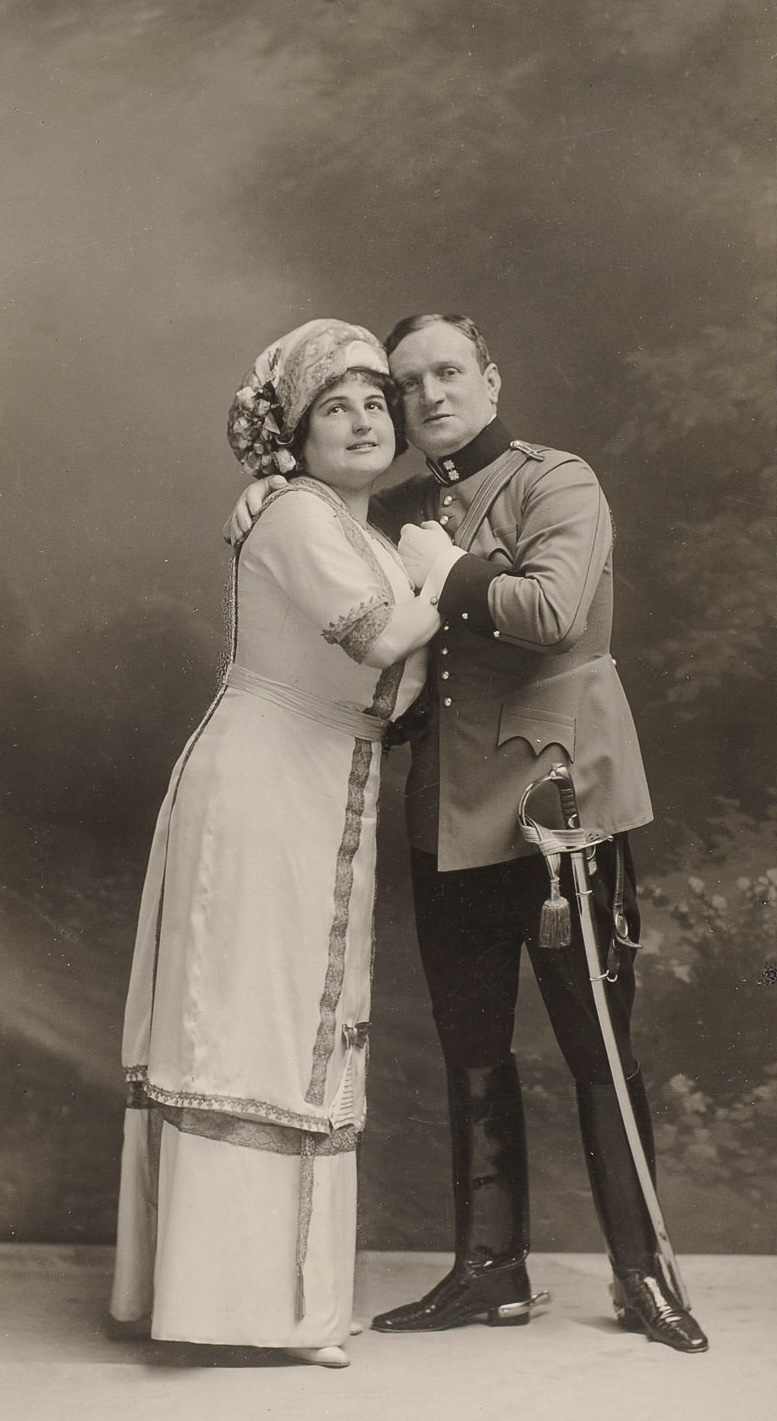
Grete Holm and Fritz Werner in Ihr Adjutant, 1911

Born into a Jewish family in Vienna on 27 February 1884, Robert Winterberg was the son of journalist Friedrich W. Winterberg (1835–1908) who was the founder of the Viennese newspaper Wiener Kommunalblatt. His mother was Pauline Schönfeld. At the age of 14, he chose to cease practicing his Jewish religion.

Winterberg studied music privately with Gustav Mahler, Robert Fuchs, and Hermann Graedener. At the age of 15, he produced his first music compositions which included a piano sonata, a string quartet, and several art songs. A few years later, the first public concert of his music was given at Ehrbar Saal (English: Ehrbar Hall) inside the Palais Ehrbar by baritone Joseph Schwartz and soprano Olga von Türk-Rohn with Winterberg as pianist. In 1906, Türk-Rohn and Winterberg were invited to Peleș Castle in Sinaia by Elisabeth of Romania where they gave a concert of Winterberg's music for the queen.

Winterberg's first experience writing music for the stage was for a new staging of Paul Wertheimer's play Die Frau des Rajah (1906) at the Volkstheater in 1909 for which he wrote incidental music. In 1910, he married the actress and singer Margarete Isbary. That same year, his first operetta, Fasching in Paris, was staged in Vienna. This was followed by two more operettas written for Viennese theatres: Ihr Adjutant (1911, Theater an der Wien) and Madame Serafin (1911, premiered at the Neuen Operntheater, Hamburg but was a co-production with the Johann Strauss Theater in Vienna).

Winterberg's early operettas in Vienna were not particularly successful, and he relocated to Berlin in hopes of achieving better success in that city. There, he had his first major success as a composer with the operetta Die Dame in Rot at the Theater des Westens in 1911. Well received, the work enjoyed popularity both in Germany and abroad. American playwright Anne Caldwell adapted it into an English language version for Broadway entitled The Lady in Red which starred Adele Rowland. It was performed at the Lyric Theatre in 1919 prior to going on a national tour.

Die Dame in Rot was the second of Winterberg's operettas to reach the Broadway stage. His 1915 operetta Die schöne Schwedin (English: The Beautiful Swede) premiered at the Theater an der Wien and was his first operetta to gain popular appeal in Vienna. It was adapted by Sigmund Romberg, Edgar Smith, and Matthew C. Woodward into The Girl from Brazil. This modified version of Winterberg's operetta premiered at Broadway's 44th Street Theatre on 30 August 1916 and enjoyed a New York run of 61 performances before going on tour.

Winterberg's greatest success as an operetta composer among European audiences was Die Dame vom Zirkus (1919) and Günstling der Zarin (1921). His operettas were staged in cities in Germany, Austria, Latvia, and Czechoslovakia during his lifetime, sometimes with Winterberg conducting or staging the performances.

In 1925, Winterberg married his second wife, Hedwig Russak, in Berlin. He died of a lung infection in Töpchin on 22 June 1930.

== Partial list of operettas ==
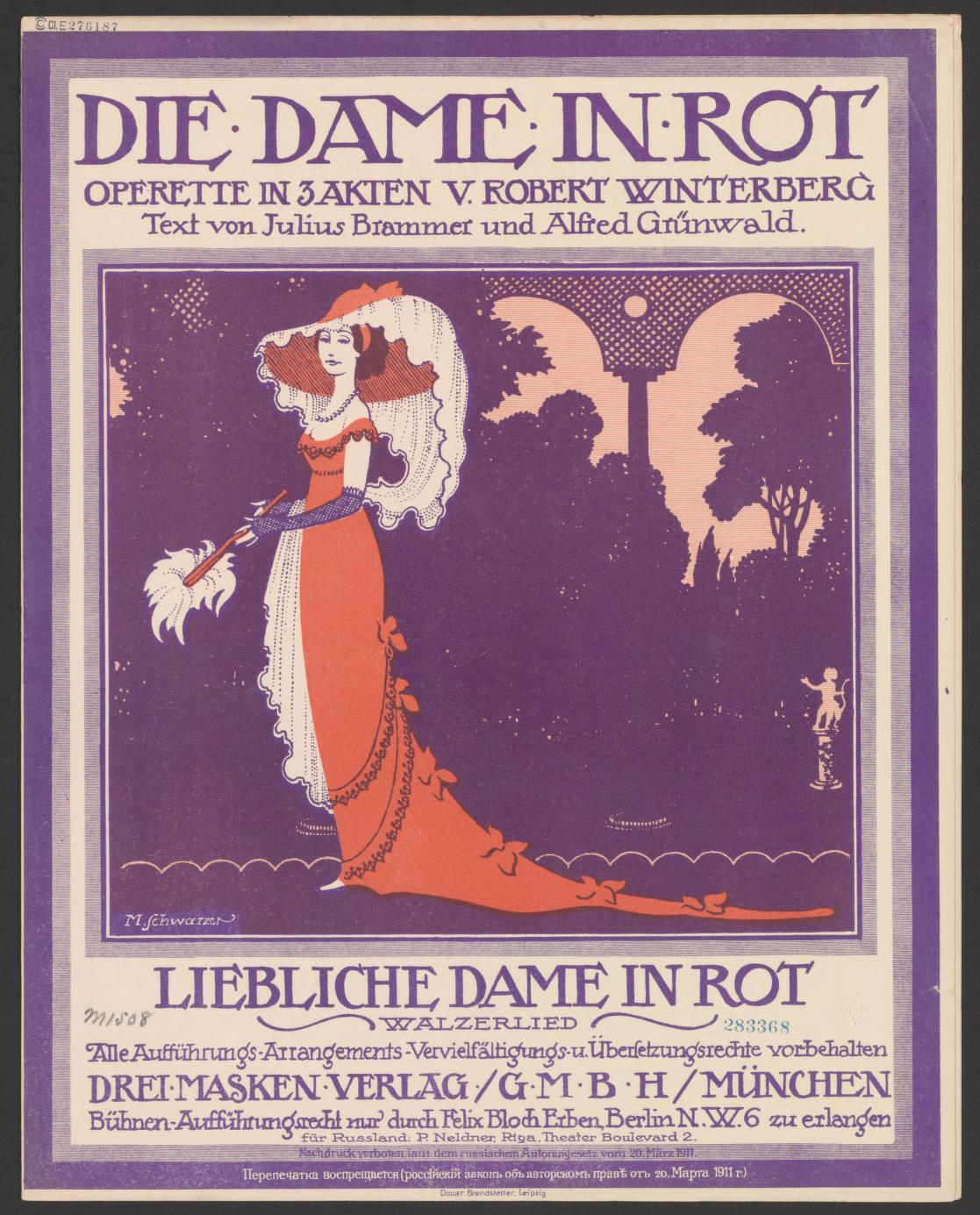
Front cover of sheet music for Winterberg's Die Dame in Rot (1911)

- Fasching in Paris (1910), librettists Benno Vigny and Louis Windhopp
- Ihr Adjutant (1911), librettists Franz von Schoenthan and Rudolf Öesterreicher
- Madame Serafin (1911), librettists Georg Okonkowski and Bruno Granichstaedten
- Die Dame in Rot (1911), librettists Julius Brammer and Alfred Grünwald
- Die Frauen von Monte Carlo (1912), librettist Alfred Deutsch-German
- Hoheit – der Franz! (1913), librettists Artur Landsberger and Willi Wolff
- Unsere Feldgrauen (1914), librettists Alfred Müller-Förster and Josef Bendiner
- Die schöne Schwedin (1915), librettists Julius Brammer and Alfred Grünwald
- Die Blumen der Maintenon (1916), librettist Reinhard Bruck
- Der sanfte Hannibal (1917), librettists Alfred Müller-Förster and Arthur Lokesh
- Graf Habenichts (1918), librettists Jean Kren and Bernhard Buchbinder
- Die Dame vom Zirkus (1919), librettists Jean Kren and Bernhard Buchbinder
- Der dumme Franzl (1919), librettist Reinhard Bruck
- Circe und die Schweine (1919), librettist Max Brod
- Der Günstling der Zarin (1921), librettists Hermann Feiner and Richard Keßler
- Der blonde Engel (1921), librettists Richard Keßler and Arthur Rebner
- Die Herrn von und zu (1922), librettists Jean Kren and Richard Bars
- Der Trompeter vom Rhein (1926), singspiel, librettists August Neidhart and Cornelis Bronsgeest
- Der junge Dessauer (also known as Anneliese von Dessau) (1926) librettists Richard Keßler and Max Jungk
