= Chicago Conservatory College =

American music college (1857–1981)

The Chicago Conservatory College was a music school of higher education from 1857 to 1981 in Chicago, Illinois, United States. The Illinois Board of Higher Education serves as the custodian of records for the college following the its closure.

According to a letter written in 1997 by the Board of Higher Education, the college was in good standing at the time of closure.

== History ==
It was founded by musician and composer Robert Goldbeck (1839–1908) in 1857 and is claimed to be the first music conservatory in the US. It preceded the Oberlin Conservatory of Music - which is today considered the oldest continuously operating conservatory in the United States - and the Chicago Academy of Music (claimed the fourth music conservatory in America) which were founded in 1865 and 1867 respectively.

The Chicago Conservatory College is mentioned among present Chicago Academy of Music, the American Conservatory of Music, the Sherwood Music School, Northwestern, DePaul, Roosevelt University and the University of Chicago in an overview of the music history of the city of Chicago.

It is likely that the music school was founded under a different name, which was eventually changed into The Chicago Conservatory College.

Soprano Olga von Türk-Rohn was dean of the voice department of the conservatory during the 1930s.
