= Reinhold von Warlich =

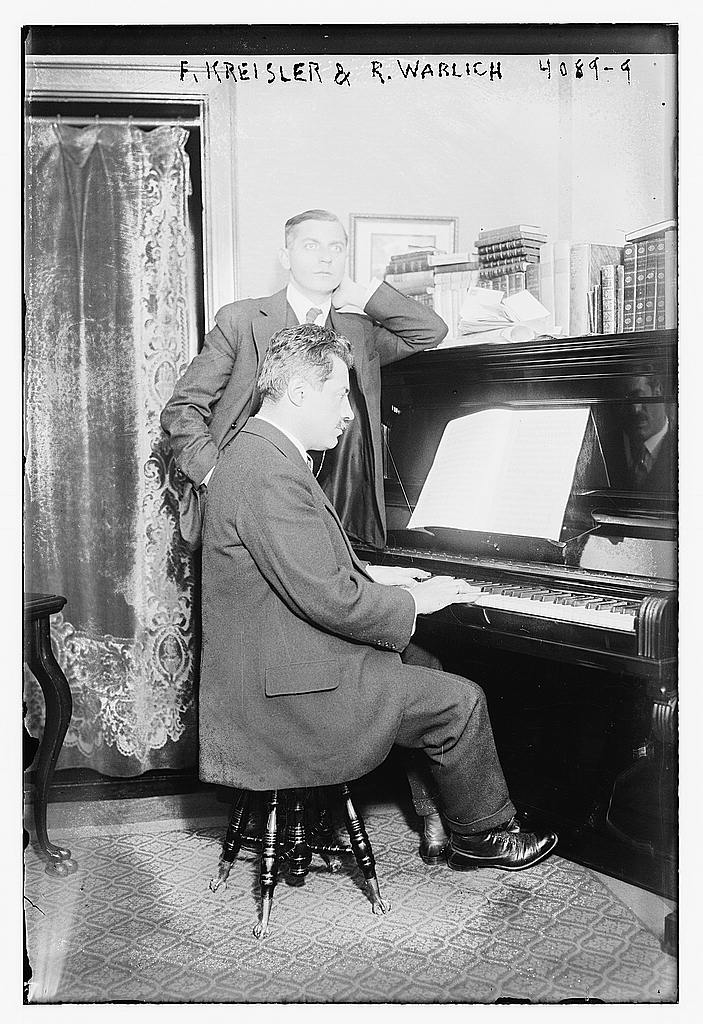
Reinhold von Warlich and Fritz Kreisler in 1917

Reinhold von Warlich (May 24, 1877 - November 10, 1939) was a Russian-born American bass-baritone.

== Biography ==
He was born in St. Petersburg, Russia on May 24, 1877. His father was the musical director for the private orchestra of Nicholas II of Russia.

He studied at the Hamburg Conservatory and then in Florence, Italy where he was a pupil of Giorgio M. Sulli.

He sang in Florence with G. Sulli and I. Braggiotti, and in Cologne with R. Thiele. He made his solo début in Florence in 1899. He toured England, Germany and France. He spent some years in Paris as a singing teacher. His United States début was in 1909 at Mendelssohn Hall in Manhattan, New York City.

In 1910 in Paris he married Georgia Cheatham Maize, the widow and second wife of Edward Judson Ovington, who owned the Ovington Gift Shop in Manhattan. Georgia and von Warlich divorced in 1917.

In 1923 he married Bertha von Turk-Rohn, daughter of Baroness Olga von Turk-Rohn.

He died on November 10, 1939, in Manhattan, New York City.
