= Orianna Santunione =

Italian operatic soprano

- Born: 1 September 1934; Sassuolo, Modena, Emilia-Romagna, Italy
- Died: 16 December 2023 (aged 89); Milan, Italy
- Occupation: Opera singer
- Years active: 1960–early 1980s

Orianna Santunione (1 September 1934 – 16 December 2023) was an Italian operatic soprano. She studied in the city of Milan under the tutelage of the Italian singers Carmen Melis and Renato Pastorino and performed at all of the principal theatres in Italy as well as abroad until her retirement from opera singing in the early 1980s.

== Biography ==
Santunione was born in the town of Sassuolo (Ponte Fossa), near the province of Modena, Emilia-Romagna, Italy on 1 September 1934. When she was young, she moved to Milan. Santunione studied in the city under the tutelage of the Italian singers Carmen Melis and Renato Pastorino. She sung soprano and made her debut in professional opera at the Teatro Nuovo in Milan as Umberto Giordano's Fedora in 1959. Santunione's debut in the United States followed in 1962 as Nedda in Pagliacci at the Dallas Opera and she first appeared at the Royal Opera House in Covent Garden in 1965 as Amelia in Giuseppe Verdi's Simon Boccanegra, also taking on the role at the Vara matinee the following year. She performed at all of Italy's principal theatres, such as La Scala under Riccardo Muti, taking the title role of Giordano’s Madame Sans-Gêne.

She received invites to perform abroad, doing so as the title role of Aida in Tokyo in 1973 (of which a DVD of the production was released), the Paris Opera for Il trovatore as Leonora in 1974, Caracas for Il trovatore in 1978; Sydney for Aida, Il trovatore and Nabucco from 1977 to 1978. Santunione performed at the Carani Theatre in Sassuolo in Tosca in 1970 and was the recipient of the "golden tile" award at the same theatre for giving Sassuolo recognition in 1974. She also had roles in Medea in Luigi Cherubini's opera, Elsa, Amelia in Un ballo in maschera, Leonora n La forza del destino, Desdemona in Othello, Santuzza, Maddalena in Andrea Chénier, La Gioconda, Riccardo Zandonai's Francesca da Rimini, Elisabetta de Valois in Don Carlos, Minnie in La fanciulla del West, the Macerata Festival (Un ballo in maschera alongside Luciano Pavarotti and Aida with Plácido Domingo), and the Ommagio a Puccini concert in 1976.

Santunione also performed at the opera houses in Amsterdam, Barcelona, Budapest, Caracas, Cincinnati, Genoa, Hamburg, Marseille, Madrid, Munich, Naples, Nice, Palermo, Parma, Philadelphia, Rouen, Sydney, Turin and Venice. She did not produce many studio recordings of her works and she made the decision to retire from opera singing in the early 1980s. Recordings include Madame Sans-Gêne, Pimmalione and Otello and Lohengrin for Italian television.

== Personal life ==
She died at the Casa di Riposo per Musicisti in Milan on 16 December 2023.
