= The Lady in Red (musical) =

American musical

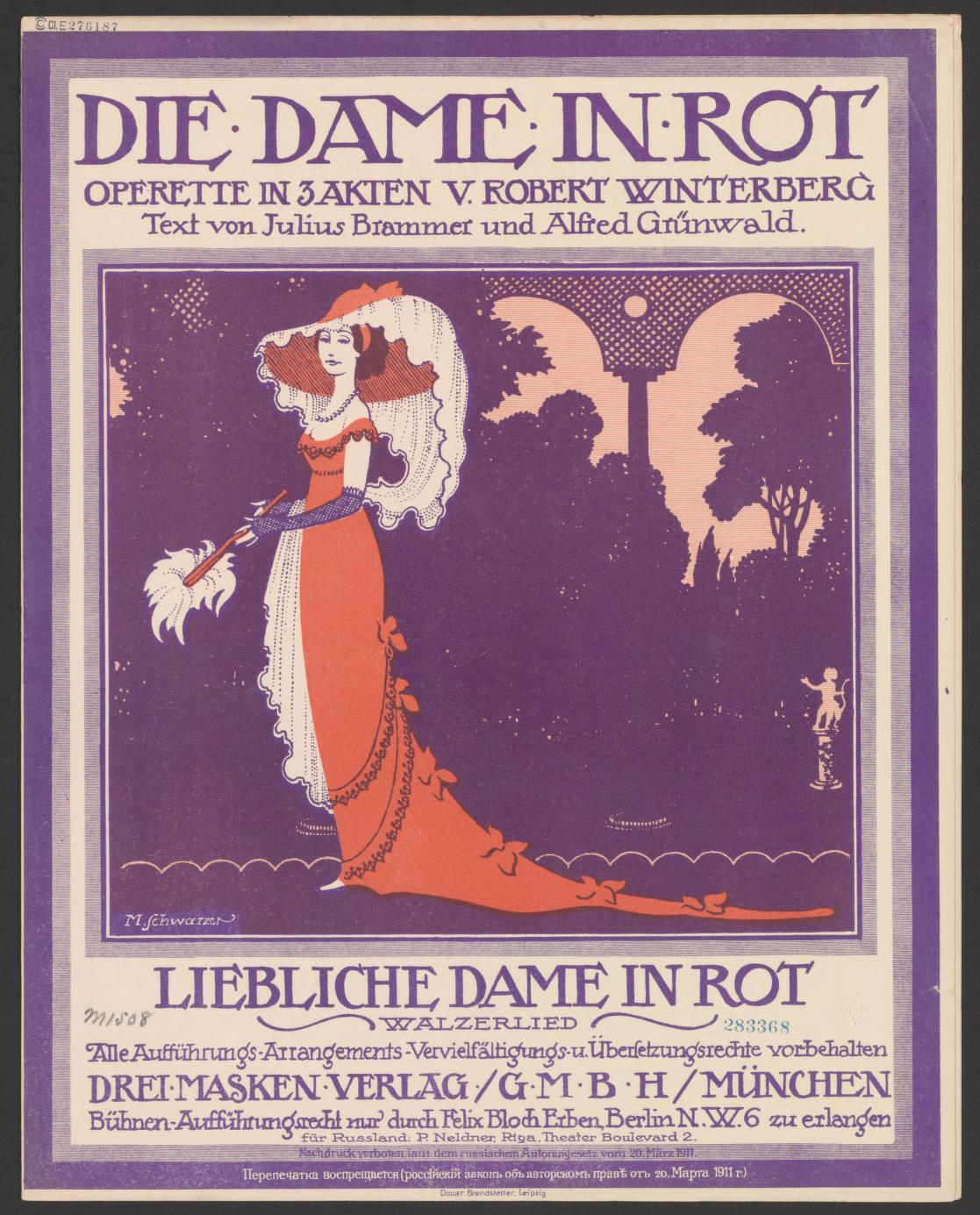
Front cover of sheet music for Winterberg's Die Dame in Rot (1911).

The Lady in Red is a musical in three acts with music by Robert Winterberg and both book and lyrics by Anne Caldwell. It was an Americanized version of Winterberg's earlier German-language operetta Die Dame in Rot (1911) with entirely new lyrics and dialogue by Caldwell and some new music by Winterberg in addition to some of the music from the earlier 1911 work. However, most of Winterberg's original score had been replaced by songs by a variety of American songwriters, many of them uncredited. Composer George Gershwin had two songs in the show, "Some Wonderful Sort of Someone," with lyrics by Schuyler Greene, and "Something About Love", with lyrics by Lou Paley.

The Lady in Red premiered at Broadway's Lyric Theatre on March 12, 1919. This new version of Winterberg's operetta was created as a starring vehicle for Adele Rowland who portrayed Kitty St. Claire. Directed by Frank Smithson and produced by John P. Slocum, the production ran on Broadway for a total of 48 performances, closing on June 21, 1919.
