= Carmen Melis =

Italian opera singer

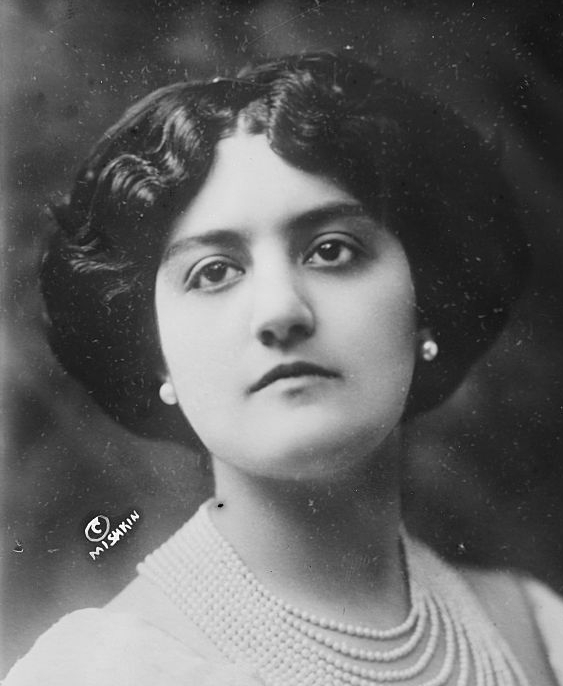
Carmen Melis

Carmen Melis (15 August 1885 – 19 December 1967) was an Italian operatic soprano who had a major international career during the first four decades of the 20th century. She was known, above all, as a verismo soprano, and was one of the most interesting singing actresses of the early 20th century. She made her debut in Novara in 1905 and her career rapidly developed in her native country over the next four years. From 1909 to 1916, she performed with important opera companies in the United States; after which she was busy performing at many of Europe's most important opera houses. From 1917 until her retirement from the stage in 1935, she was particularly active at the Teatro Costanzi in Rome and at La Scala in Milan. After her singing career ended, she embarked on a second career as a voice teacher. Her most notable student was soprano Renata Tebaldi.

== Education and early career in Europe ==
Born in Cagliari, Melis began her voice studies with dramatic soprano Teresina Singer in Florence. This was followed by further studies with baritone Antonio Cotogni in Rome, and with Jean de Reszke in Paris. She made her professional opera debut in 1905 in the title role of Jules Massenet's Thaïs at the Teatro Coccia in Novara at the age of 20. She had her first major success in 1906 at the Teatro di San Carlo as the title heroine in Pietro Mascagni's Iris.

In 1907, Melis toured Russia, notably giving performances at the Bolshoi Theatre in Moscow and the Mariinsky Theatre in Saint Petersburg. She sang Thaïs again for her debuts at the Teatro Costanzi in Rome (1907) and La Fenice in Venice (1908). She returned to the Teatro Costanzi in 1908 to sing Desdemona in Giuseppe Verdi's Otello with Giuseppe De Luca as Iago.

== Performing in the United States ==
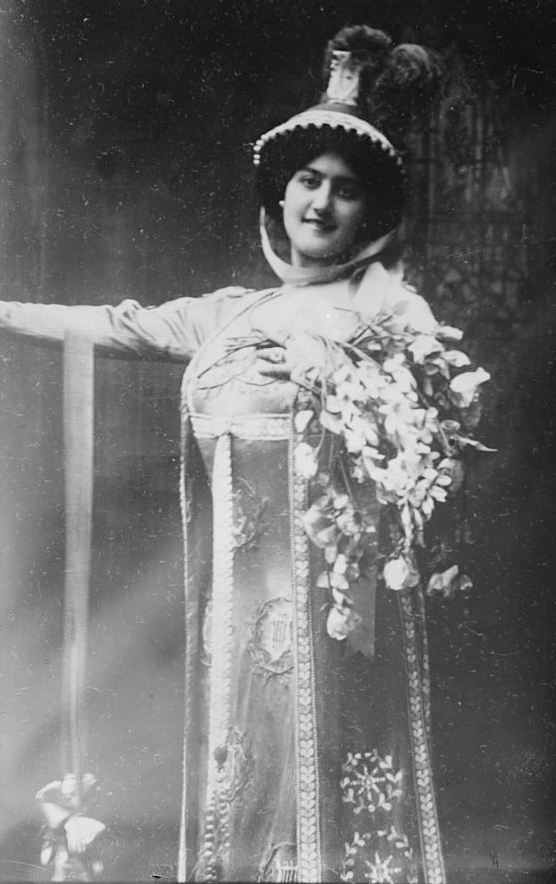
Carmen Melis

Melis continued her vocal training in New York City with Giorgio M. Sulli. In November 1909 she made her United States debut with Oscar Hammerstein I's Manhattan Opera Company at the Manhattan Opera House in New York City as the title heroine in Giacomo Puccini's Tosca. She repeated the role with the company the following month on tour to Pittsburgh. In January 1910, she sang Mimì in Puccini's La Bohème and Santuzza in Mascagni's Cavalleria rusticana with the company. This was followed by performances of Desdemona in February 1910, and in April 1910 she performed the title role in Massenet's Manon opposite Enrico Caruso's Chevalier des Grieux at the Manhattan Opera House. She also performed all these roles at the Philadelphia Opera House 1910, which was also operated by Hammerstein.

In November 1910, Melis portrayed Cio-Cio-San in Puccini's Madama Butterfly at the Manhattan Opera House in the presence of the composer. Her performance impressed Puccini, and he became an admirer of her voice. Puccini went on to personally teach Melis the role of Minnie in his La Fanciulla del West, which she performed for the first time in 1911 with the Boston Opera Company. She had previously made her debut at the Boston Opera House in 1910 in the title role of Verdi's Aida. She sang several more roles in Boston through 1912, including Cio-Cio-San, Desdemona, and Mimi. She also sang the role of Aida with the Chicago Grand Opera Company in Chicago in 1911 and on tour with the company in Philadelphia in 1912.

From 1913 to 1915, Melis made several appearances in San Francisco, including portraying Cio-Cio-San, Tosca, and Fleana in the United States premiere of Ruggero Leoncavallo's Zingari (1913). In 1915, she joined the newly formed Chicago Opera Association where she performed roles in mainly operas by Verdi and Puccini for one season. She notably portrayed the title roles in the United States premieres of two operas with the company: Camille Saint-Saëns' Déjanire (1915) and Leoncavallo's Zazà (1916). She was also successful as a concert singer in the United States.

== Later performance career in Europe ==
In 1912, Melis made her debut at the Paris Opera as Puccini's Minnie with Caruso as Dick Johnson. Caruso also served as her partner for her debut at the Opéra de Monte-Carlo as Minnie in 1912 and at Covent Garden in London as Nedda in Pagliacci in 1913. She also sang the role of Mussetta at Covent Garden that year. She returned to the Royal Opera House in London only one other time in her career, in 1929 as Tosca and Maliella in Ermanno Wolf-Ferrari's I gioielli della Madonna. In 1916, she returned to the Paris Opera to portray the title role in Puccini's Manon Lescaut with Amedeo Bassi as Des Grieux and Domenico Viglione-Borghese as Lescaut.

In 1917, Melis made her debut at La Scala in the world premiere of Victor de Sabata's Il macigno. She returned with some frequency to La Scala up into the 1930s, often portraying roles from the operas of Puccini and Verdi. At La Scala in 1924 she notably created the role of Ginevra in the world premiere of Umberto Giordano's La cena delle beffe under conductor Arturo Toscanini. In 1926, she performed again, with great success, at La Fenice in Venice with Italian tenor Armando Bini, in Madama Butterfly. In 1929 she made a complete recording of the role of Tosca with Apollo Granforte as Scarpia, La Scala's orchestra, and conductor Carlo Sabajno. She was also highly active with the Teatro Costanzi in Rome during the 1920s and made numerous appearances as a guest artist in major Italian theatres up until her retirement from the stage in 1935.

== Work as a voice teacher and later life ==
Around her performance career ceased in 1935, Melis began a second career as a voice teacher. She began her teaching career on the faculty of the Pesaro Conservatory and later taught out of a private studio in Milan. Her most notable pupil was soprano Renata Tebaldi, who credits Melis as a great influence. Tebaldi stated, "Everything I needed to learn for the stage, I learned from her." She was also the teacher of Rita Orlandi-Malaspina, Adriana Maliponte, and Orianna Santunione.

Melis died in Longone al Segrino in 1967 at the age of 82.

== Recordings ==
- Whilst recordings by Melis are rare, there is a complete 1929 Tosca from La Scala with Piero Pauli and Apollo Granforte, cond. Carlo Sabajno, available on CD, VAI AUDIO, 1076–2.
- The Pupil and the Teacher is a CD of arias by Melis and Tebaldi, on the Russian Fono Enterprise FONO 1055.
- There are more extensive collections of Carmen Melis' non-Tosca recordings on Tima Club 34 (two LPs) and Rococo 5259 (one LP).
