= Giorgio M. Sulli =

Italian-born American voice teacher, conductor, composer (1864–1918)

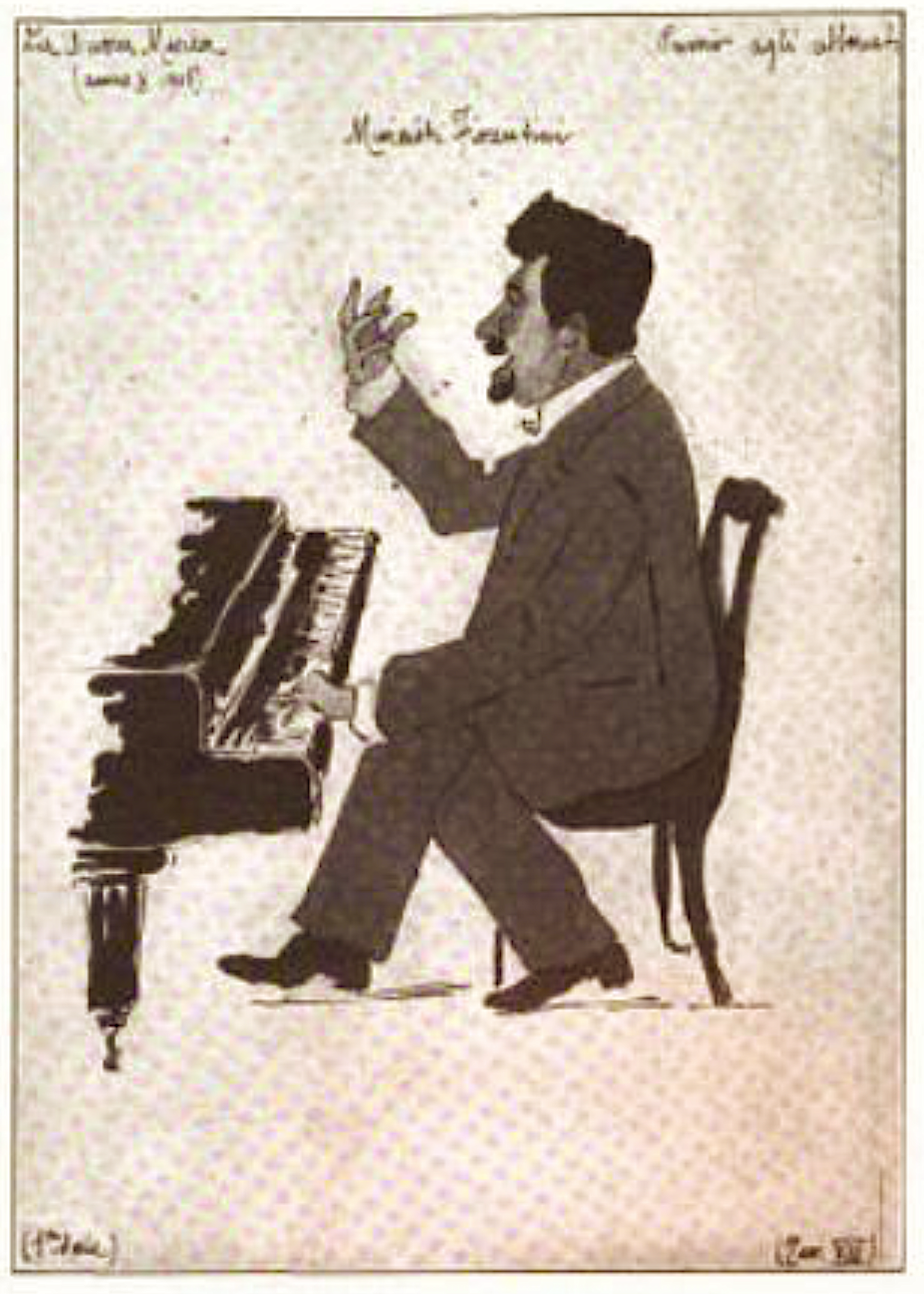
1908 caricature of Giorgio M. Sulli

Giorgio Mario Sulli (23 February 1864 – 18 March 1918) was an Italian-born American voice teacher, conductor, and composer. Trained at the Naples Conservatory, he had an active international career as an opera conductor from 1884 until 1894. After this he primarily worked as a voice teacher. In 1905 he relocated to the United States where he was active as a voice teacher and church musician in New York City and New Haven, Connecticut. He taught several well known opera singers. He died in New York City in 1918.

== Life and career ==
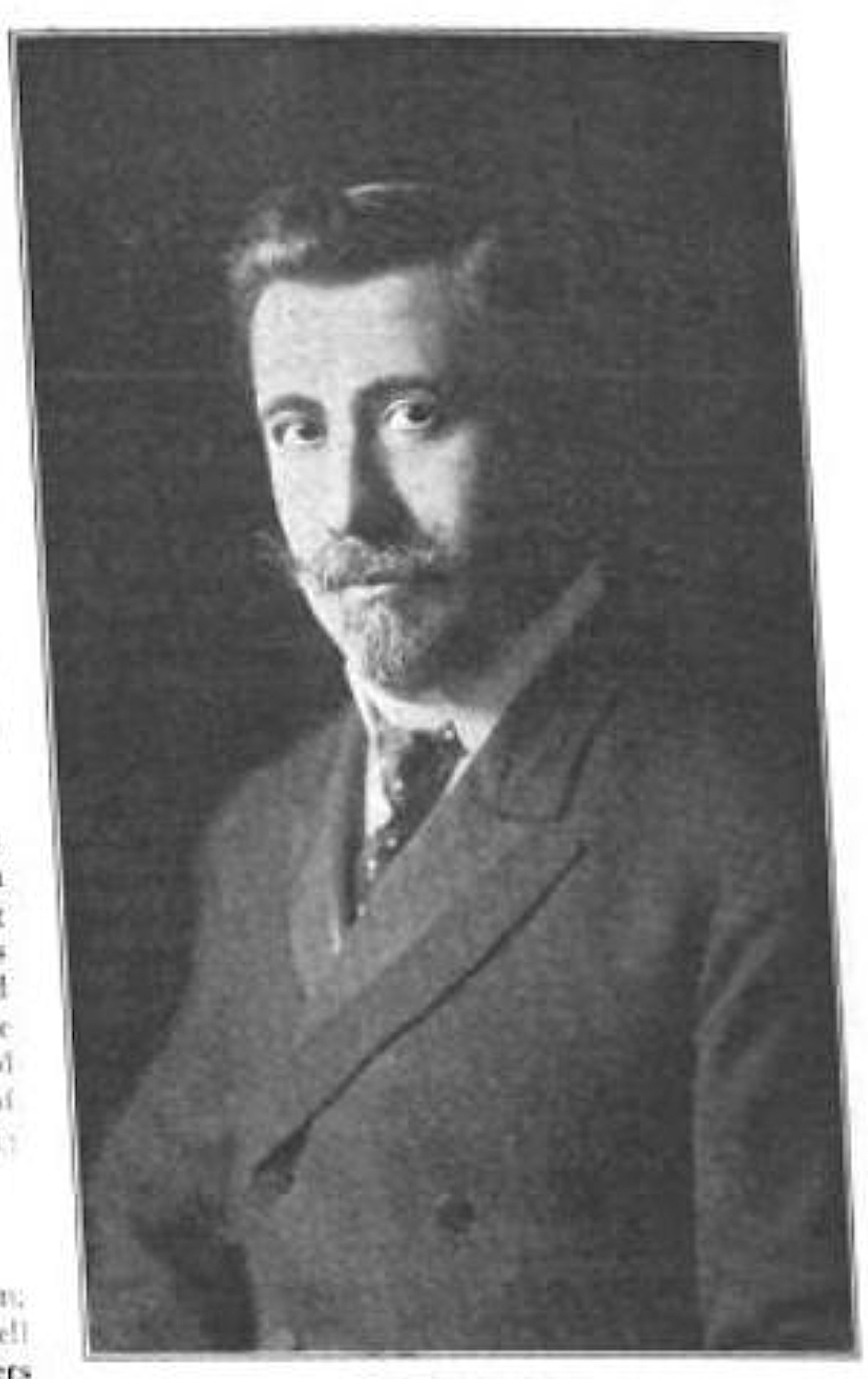
Giorgio M. Sulli

The son of Giovanni Sulli and Carolina Sulli (nee Firaux), Giorgio Mario Sulli was born on 23 February 1864 in Palermo, Italy. His mother had a career on the stage as a dramatic soprano. He was educated as a musician at the Naples Conservatory (NC) where he graduated in 1884. He was appointed Alphonso Guercia's assistant at the NC in 1880; and from him learned how to work as a vocal coach.

Sulli had active international career as an opera conductor from 1884 to 1894 during which time he conducted more than 50 different operas. He worked as an opera conductor at major theaters in Italy, Spain, Austria, and North and South America. In 1884 he conducted productions of Faust and Fra Diavolo at the Teatro Bellini, Naples. When Aida was staged for the first time in Siena in 1896, Sulli was invited to conduct the work at the request of the opera's composer, Giuseppe Verdi.

After 1894, Sulli devoted his career to working as a voice teacher and church musician. He worked as a voice teacher in Florence and then relocated to New York City in 1905. He taught voice lessons in New York out of a studio located at 267 West 70th Street. Notable singers who studied with him either in Italy or New York included sopranos Carmen Melis, Lena Mason, Tarquinia Tarquini, Giuseppina Huguet, Marta Du Lac, and Clara Clemens (daughter of Mark Twain); tenor Umberto Sorrentino; baritone Mario Sammarco; and bass-baritone Reinhold Warlich.

From 1905 until 1909 he served as choirmaster of St. Michael's Roman Catholic Church at 29 Wooster Pl and 234 Greene Street in New Haven, Connecticut. He later worked in the same capacity at Labor Temple in New York City from 1914 until 1916; a Presbyterian Church located at 242 East 14th Street.

His compositional output included art songs, a cantata, and works for solo piano. He also composed one opera, Dhalma; selections from which were given frequently during his lifetime in symphony concerts.

Sulli died in New York City on 18 March 1918. The cause of death was heart failure. He had one child with his first wife, the singer Vittoria Petrilli. He married his second wife, Margaret J. Penn, in 1913. His second wife was also a singer, and she continued to teach singing out of Sulli's studio in New York after his death.
