= Mabel Rowland =

American actress (1879–1943)

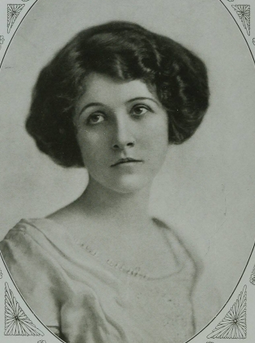
- Mabel Rowland, from a 1909 photograph by Sarony.
- Born: Mabel Laura Levi; February 8, 1879; Philadelphia, Pennsylvania
- Died: February 21, 1943 (aged 64); Hollywood, California
- Occupations: Actress, monologist, writer, director, editor
- Spouses: John Briel Rowland (m. 1900; died 1908); Robert Emmet Mason Goolrick (m. 1911, divorced); Jay Spencer Strong (sep. 1940)
- Relatives: Adele Rowland (sister); C. O'Conor Goolrick (brother-in-law)

Mabel Rowland (February 8, 1879 – February 21, 1943) was an American monologist, actress, writer, director, editor, and the founder of the Metropolitan Players in New York City.

== Early life ==
Mabel Laura Levi was born in Philadelphia, Pennsylvania, to Abraham D. Levi and Adelina (Lloyd) Levi. Her father was a printer and engraver. Her younger sister was the actress and singer Adele Rowland.

== Career ==
Rowland wrote a weekly column, "Mabelle's Letter on Fashion and Frivolity" for The Cincinnati Enquirer newspaper as a young woman. Rowland was a monologist, who gave short, comic character sketches. She also did publicity, and managed her actress sister's career.

In 1916 Rowland organized a wartime fundraiser, a cookbook, with recipes contributed by over 200 actors and actresses.

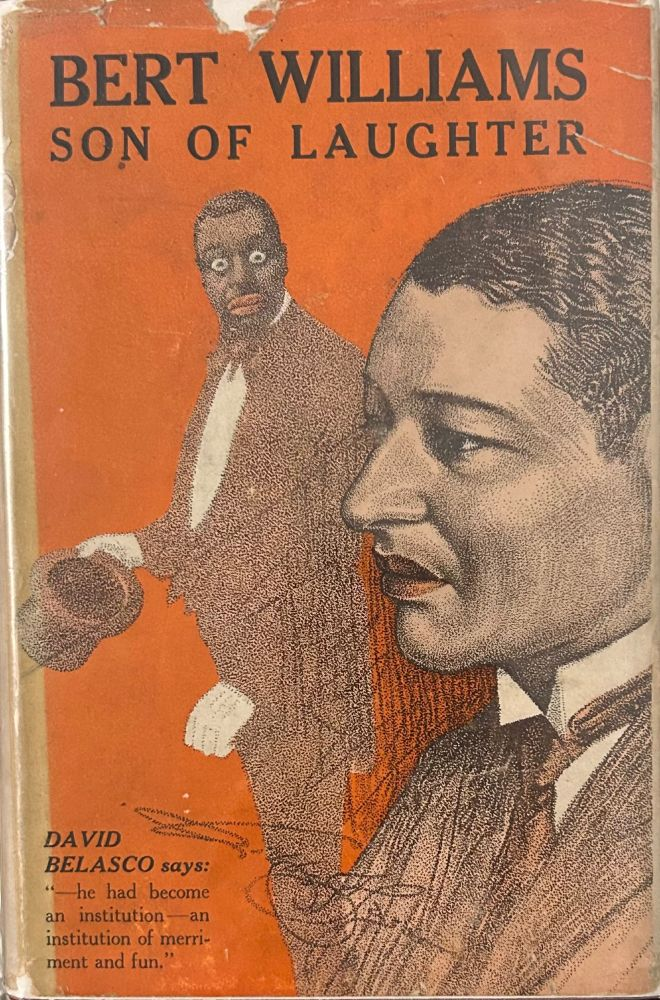
Bert Williams Son of Laughter. (1923)

She also edited Bert Williams: Son of Laughter (1923), a collection of tributes to Bert Williams, a fellow comedian and actor, written by notable performers and others, including David Belasco, Eddie Cantor, W.C. Fields, W. E. B. Du Bois, and Ring Lardner.

In 1925, Rowland was founder and director of the Metropolitan Players in New York City. In 1926, she was founder of the Institute of the Woman's Theatre, to increase and improve professional opportunities for women in theatre.

Rowland was a benefactor of the Bide-a-Wee Home for Friendless Animals, and received a medal for her support of the organization.

== Personal life ==
Mabel Levi married three times. Her first husband was John B. Rowland, head of an advertising agency; they married in 1900, and he died from typhoid fever in 1908. Her second husband was Robert Emmet Mason Goolrick, a lieutenant in the United States Army; they married in 1911, and later divorced. Her last husband was a fellow theatre professional, Jay Strong; they separated in 1940. She died on February 21, 1943, aged 64 years, at her sister's home in Hollywood, California. Her book Bert Williams: Son of Laughter was reprinted in 1969.
