= Joseph Schwarz (baritone) =

Russian-born German baritone (1880–1926)

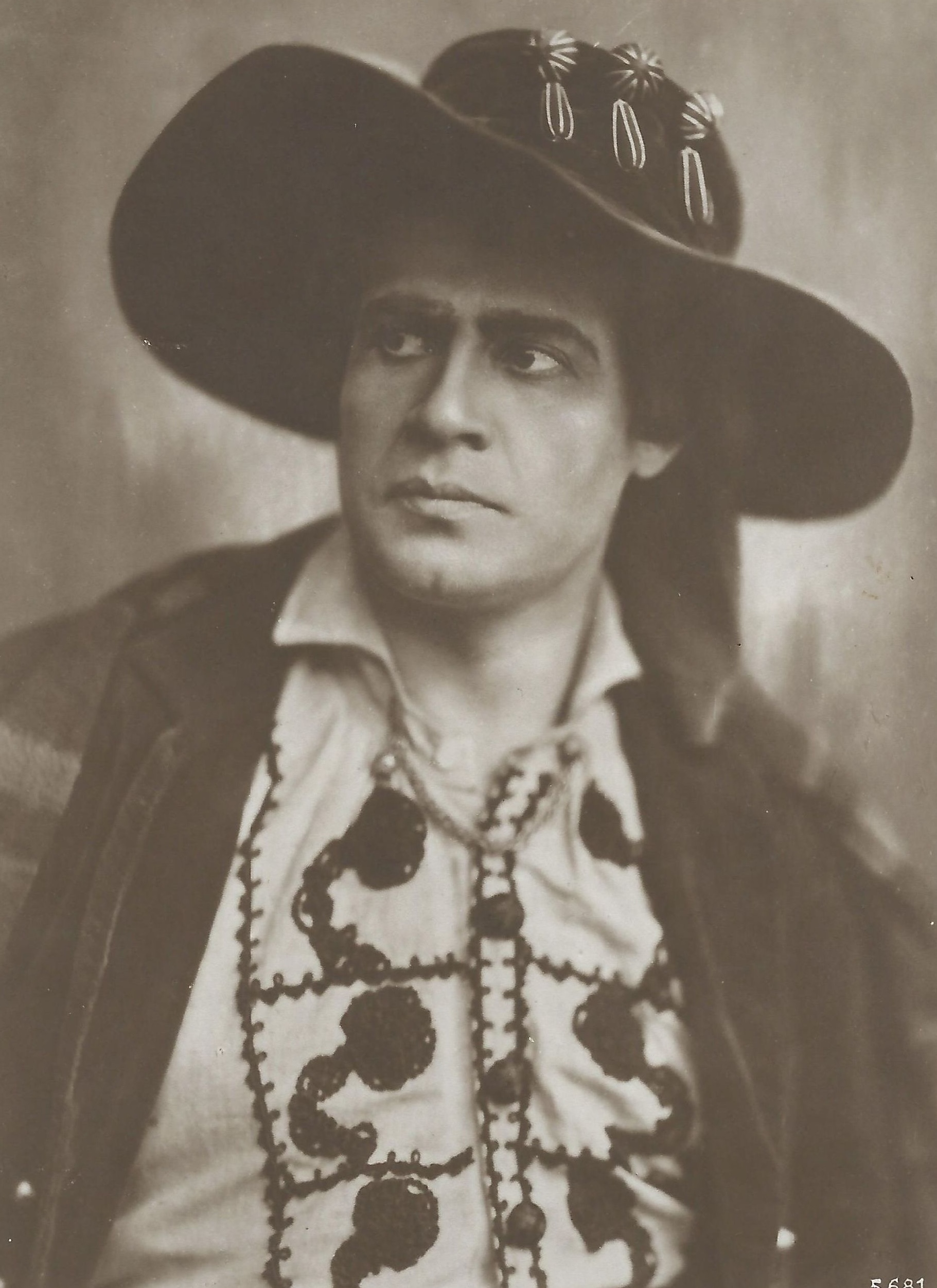
- Schwarz as Sebastiano in Tiefland, c. 1916
- Born: 10 October 1880; Riga
- Died: 10 November 1926 (aged 46); Berlin
- Education: Vienna Conservatory
- Occupation: Operatic baritone
- Organizations: Rigaer Stadttheater; Vienna State Opera; Berlin State Opera; Chicago Opera Association

Joseph M. Schwarz (10 October 1880 – 10 November 1926) was a Russian-born German baritone. He pursued a performance career against the wishes of his parents, running away from home as a teenager to join a band of traveling minstrels. He later trained at the Vienna Conservatory and had an active international performance career in operas and concerts during the first quarter of the twentieth century.

After making his professional opera debut as Amonasro in Verdi's Aida at the Linz State Theatre in 1900, Schwarz worked as a resident artist at first the Rigaer Stadttheater and then the Graz Opera and Mariinsky Theatre. In 1906 he returned to Vienna to join the roster of artists at the Vienna Volksoper before being committed to the Vienna State Opera from 1909 to 1915. From 1915 to 1921 he was a principal artist at the Berlin State Opera, and from 1921 to 1925 he sang with the Chicago Opera Association and its predecessor the Chicago Civic Opera. He also appeared as a guest artist with several opera houses, including the Paris Opera, the San Francisco Opera, and the Royal Opera House in London.

Alcoholism impacted Schwarz's voice during the latter part of his career and he died in Berlin in 1926. His voice is preserved on several recordings made during the first two decades of the twentieth century for a variety of record labels, including Zonophone, Pathé Records, and Deutsche Grammophon. He should not be confused with bass Joseph E. Schwarz who had a career at the Prague State Opera.

== Early life and education ==
Joseph M. Schwarz was born in Riga on 10 October 1880 in what was then part of the Russian Empire and is today Latvia. His initial studies and performances in music were as a pianist in Riga. He grew up in poverty and had nine siblings. Part of a Jewish family, he attended services at Riga's Great Choral Synagogue on Gogol Street where the singing of cantor Baruch Leib Rosowsky had a profound impact on his decision to pursue a career as a vocalist. He joined the choir at that synagogue and had his initial vocal instruction in that ensemble.

Schwarz's father was a tailor and his parents wanted Joseph to pursue this profession as well. Unhappy with the life planned for him by his family, he ran away from home and joined a band of traveling minstrels with whom he toured the Baltic provinces. Still a teenager, he was able to pursue formal education as a singer through the aid of a wealthy Russian nobleman. He studied singing in Berlin with baritone Alexander Heinemann (1873–1919) before entering the Vienna Conservatory. While studying in Vienna he performed with soprano Olga von Türk-Rohn in the very first professional concert featuring music composed by Robert Winterberg at Ehrbar Saal (English: Ehrbar Hall) inside the Palais Ehrbar.

== Later life and singing career ==
Schwarz made his professional opera debut in 1900 in Verdi's Aida at the Linz State Theatre. He then returned to Riga where he was a principal artist at the Rigaer Stadttheater (precursor to the Latvian National Opera) for two seasons. This was followed by two seasons with the Graz Opera. He then spent time performing with the Imperial Russian Opera at the Mariinsky Theatre in Saint Petersburg.

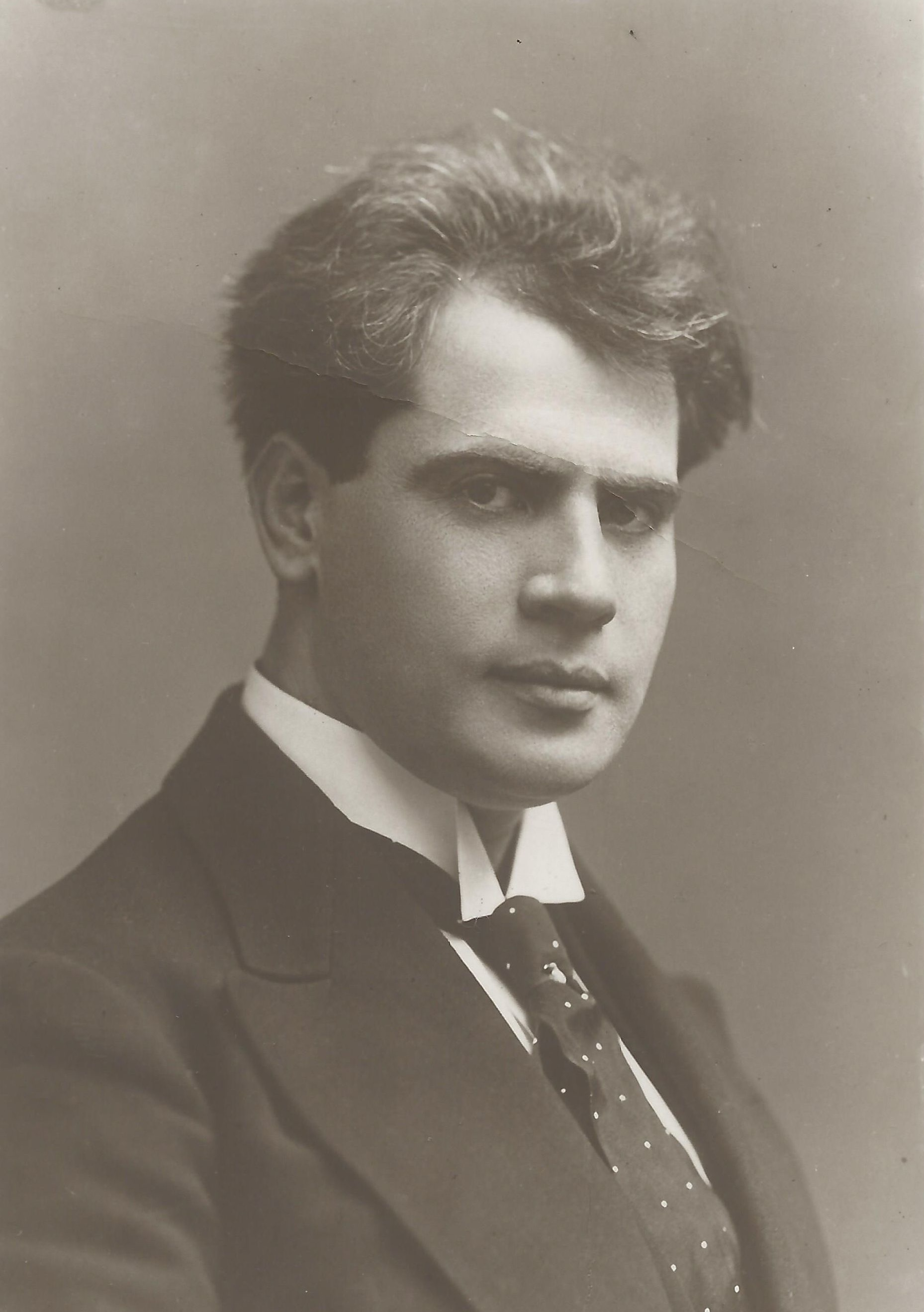
Schwarz in 1912

After leaving St. Petersburg, Schwarz returned to Vienna where he was a leading baritone at the Vienna Volksoper from 1906 to 1909. He married Hannah Radon in 1907, divorcing her in 1908. He then worked as a principal artist at the Vienna State Opera (VSO) from 1909 to 1915; making his debut with the company as the Conte di Luna in Verdi's Il trovatore. His repertoire at the VSO included Le Comte de Nevers in Meyerbeer's Les Huguenots which he performed under the baton of Gustav Mahler. Some of the other roles in his repertoire included Germont in La traviata, Iago in Otello, Scarpia in Puccini's Tosca, Tonio in Leoncavallo's Pagliacci, Wolfram in Wagner's Tannhäuser, and the title role in Rigoletto.

In 1915 Schwarz left the VSO to become a resident artist at the Berlin State Opera where he remained committed until 1921. In Berlin he starred in the world premiere of Leo Blech's Rappelkopf (1917). He also appeared as a guest artist with the Paris Opera and the Royal Swedish Opera, and performed in operas in Milan under conductor Arturo Toscanini.

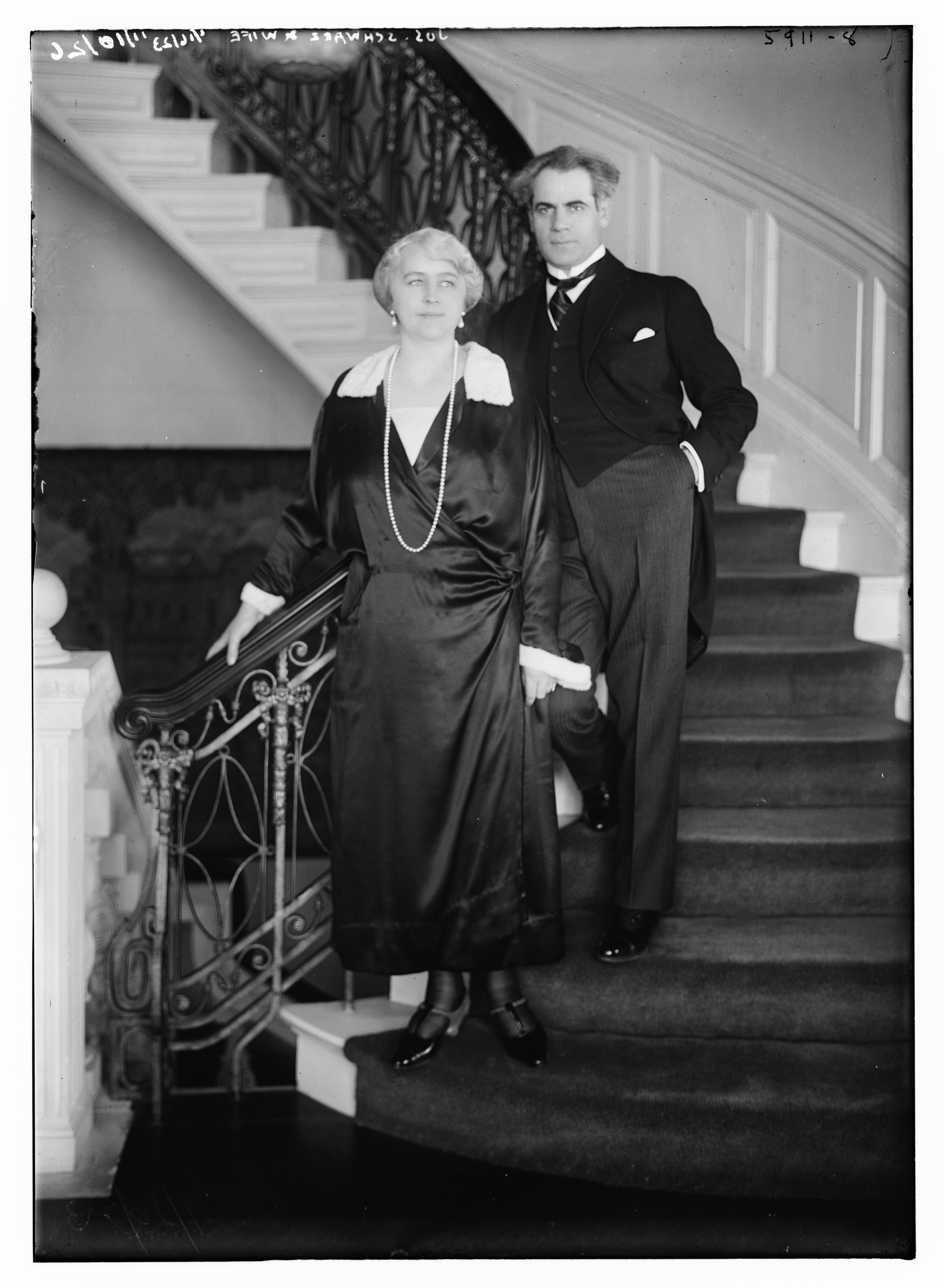
Schwarz with his wife Clara Sielcken in 1923

Schwarz left Germany for the United States where he was a principal artist with first the Chicago Opera Association and then its predecessor, the Chicago Civic Opera from 1921 to 1925. In 1922 he married Clara Sielcken in New York City; she was a German-born widow who had previously been married to the "coffee king" millionaire Hermann Sielcken. Clara was the daughter of sugar manufacturer Paul Isenberg. In 1924 he performed the role of Rigoletto at the Royal Opera House in London. In 1925 he gave a recital at the Salzburg Festival. On 12 January 1926, he starred as Hou in the United States premiere of Joseph Redding's Fay Yen Fah at the San Francisco Opera. His last performance was in the role of Rigoletto which he portrayed in Berlin shortly before his death in 1926.

Schwarz battled alcoholism in his later career and his voice began to decline while working in Chicago. He developed a medical problem with his kidneys which required surgery in 1926. He died during that surgery in Berlin on 10 November 1926.

== Recordings ==
Schwarz made several recordings during his career, the first of which were released in 1906 by Zonophone. He made several phonograph cylinder recordings in 1907 in Vienna. In 1910–1911 he made several recordings released by Pathé Records. He also made records with Parlophone in Vienna in 1911 and in Berlin in 1913. From 1916 to 1919 he made several recordings with the Deutsche Grammophon label. A planned Christmas record for Vox Records was supposed to be recorded in 1926, the year of Schwarz's death, but never happened.
