= Josefina Huguet =

Catalan soprano (1871–1950)

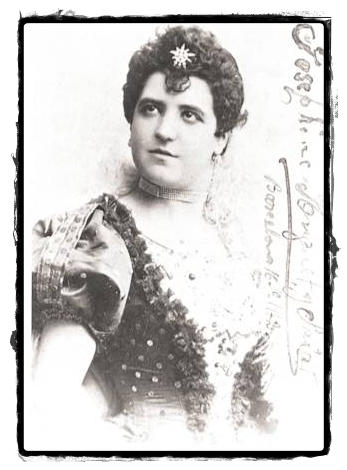
- Born: September 22, 1871; Barcelona, Spain
- Died: November 10, 1950 (aged 79); Barcelona, Spain
- Occupation: soprano

Josefina Huguet i Salat, also known by the pseudonyms Giuseppina Huguet and Josephine Huguet, (22 September 1871– 10 November 1950) was a Catalan operatic soprano with a lyrical voice who sang throughout Europe prior to World War I. Although Huguet often sang coloratura soprano parts, such as Rosina in Rossini's Il Barbiere di Siviglia, she also undertook the verismo roles of Mimì in Puccini's La Bohème and Cio-Cio-San in Puccini's Madama Butterfly. Her complete repertoire contained a wide range of roles: from The Queen of Night in Mozart's The Magic Flute to Nedda in Leoncavallo's Pagliacci.

== Life and career ==
Josefina Huguet was born on 22 September 1871 in Barcelona. Her father worked as a chauffeur for a Spanish industrialist. Her first music teacher was Francisco Bonet in Barcelona. She also studied at the Conservatori Superior de Música del Liceu. She later continued her vocal studies with Giorgio M. Sulli.

Huguet made her professional opera debut in 1888 at the Liceu in the title role of Léo Delibes's Lakmé. Her other repertoire at the Liceu that year included the parts of Micaëla in Carmen and Inès in L'Africaine with casts that included the tenor Julián Gayarre. She subsequently toured several countries, including some South American nations. She first performed in Italy in 1895, and in 1896 appeared for the first time in Milan at La Scala in the role of Ophélie in Ambroise Thomas's Hamlet. After this she worked at the Teatro Costanzi in Rome. She also appeared at the Teatro Argentina in that city where she performed the part of Elvira in I puritani in 1899.

On 6 November 1896 Huguet made her first appearance in the United States at the Academy of Music in New York City as Amina in La sonnambula with James Henry Mapleson's opera company. This was followed by performances in the title role of Lucia di Lammermoor. In 1898 she went on an extensive North American tour during which she was favorably compared to Adelina Patti by the New York critics while appearing at the Academy of Music.

After this, Huguet appeared successfully in opera houses in London, Paris, Madrid, Barcelona, Monte Carlo, Lisbon, and Russia. In 1900 she portrayed the part of Mimì in Puccini's La Bohème first the first time at the Teatro Arriaga in Bilbao. In 1901 she appeared as Violetta in La traviata at La Fenice and Amina in La sonnambula at the Teatro di San Carlo. She retired from the stage in 1912.

In retirement Huguet worked as a voice teacher in Spain. She died at the age of 79 on 10 November 1950 in Barcelona.

== Recordings ==
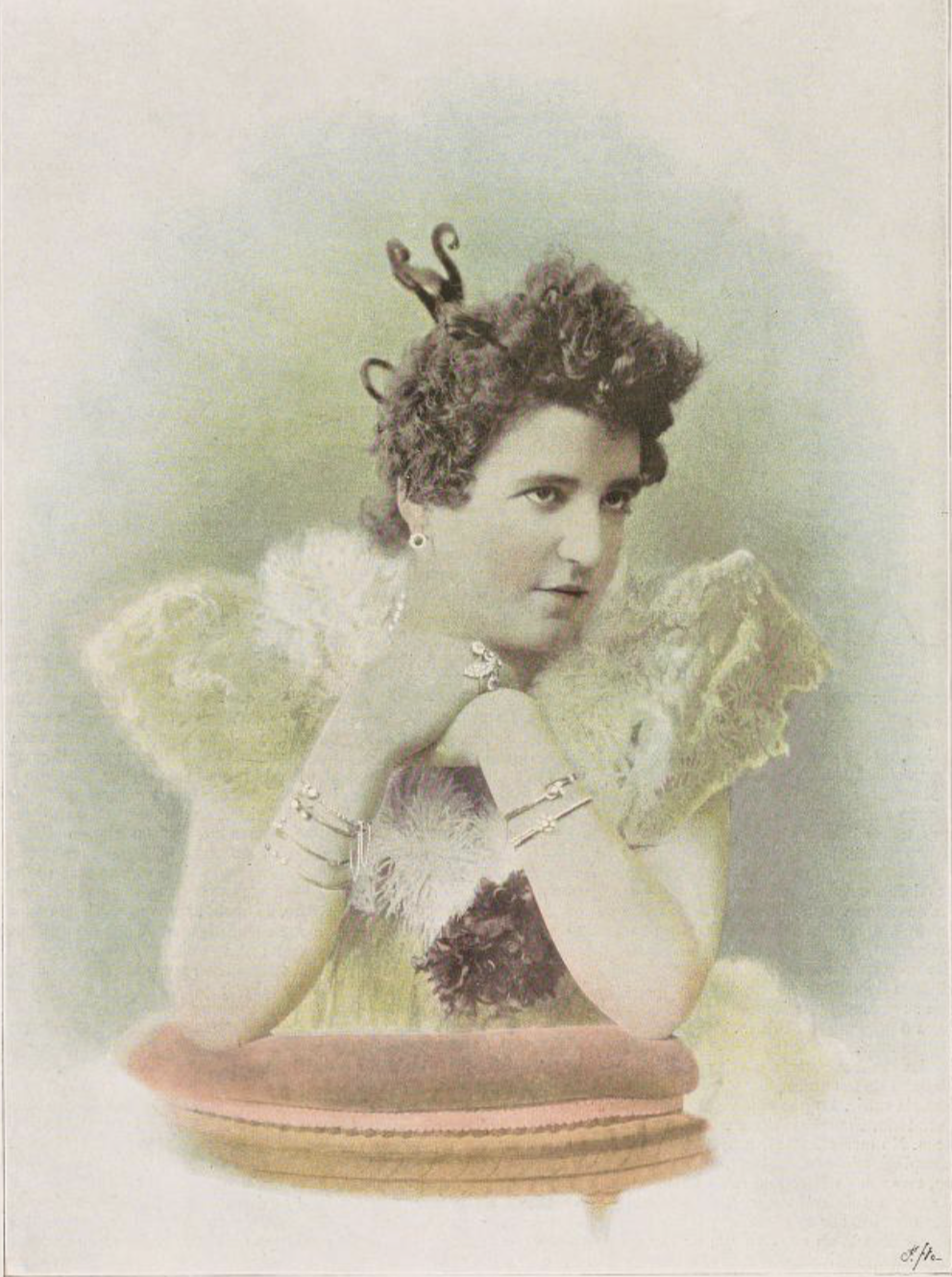
Josefina Huguet

According to Karl-Josef Kutsch and Leo Riemens, Huguet's voices was "abundantly represented" on phonograph records. She made numerous recordings for the Gramophone & Typewriter Company from 1903-1908. Her discography consists mainly of arias and ensemble pieces from operas. Her recording of "O luce di quest'anima" is a particular favorite among record collectors.

Huguet sang the role of Nedda in the first complete recording of Pagliacci in 1907 (with the Orchestra and Chorus of the Teatro alla Scala di Milano, Carlo Sabajno conducting). Her recordings also include excerpts from Wagner's Lohengrin (on which she is accompanied by the famous tenor Fernando De Lucia). Volume One of The Record of Singing by Michael Scott (Duckworth, London, 1977) contains a synopsis of her career and an appraisal of her records, some of which are available on CD transfers.

Along with Rafael Bezares, Huguet was among a small number of Spanish opera singers to be recorded, as the Compagnie Francaise du Gramophone were more focused on native genres, such as zarzuela and flamenco. 17 commercial wax cylinder of her voice survive; she also recorded 23 cylinders privately for the industrialist Ruperto Regordosa. Huguet's coloratura soprano and high register were advantageous to her recording, as these voice types recorded particularly well on wax cylinders.
