= Rita Orlandi-Malaspina =

Italian operatic soprano

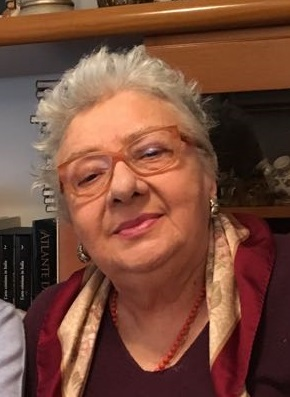
Rita Orlandi-Malaspina

Rita Orlandi-Malaspina (28 December 1937 – 8 April 2017) was an Italian operatic soprano who had a major international career from the 1960s through the 1980s. She drew particular acclaim for her portrayals of Verdi heroines. She also had a successful career as a concert soprano, particularly in performance of Verdi's Requiem and Ludwig van Beethoven's Symphony No. 9.

She was married to bass Massimiliano Malaspina who also has an important opera career. Prior to her marriage she performed under the name Rita Orlandi.

== Biography ==
Born in Bologna, Orlandi was a student of the famous Italian soprano and voice teacher Carmen Melis in Milan. She made her professional stage debut in Milan in 1963 at the Teatro Nuovo as Giovanna in Verdi's Giovanna d'Arco. She quickly became a major figure in Italy's most important opera houses during the 1960s.

Orlandi-Malaspina enjoyed a particularly fruitful partnership with La Scala, where she made her debut on 29 April 1966 as Leonora in Verdi's La forza del destino under the baton of Gianandrea Gavazzeni with a cast that included Luigi Ottolini, Piero Cappuccilli, Nicola Zaccaria, Bianca Maria Casoni and Renato Capecchi. Other Verdi roles she was admired for at that house were Aida, Amelia in Un ballo in maschera, Elvira in Ernani, Leonara in Il trovatore, and Odabella in Attila. She also appeared as a guest artist at the Teatro dell'Opera di Roma, the Teatro di San Carlo, the Teatro Carlo Felice, La Fenice, the Teatro Regio di Parma, the Teatro Massimo, the Teatro Regio di Torino, the Teatro Comunale di Bologna, and the Teatro Comunale Giuseppe Verdi. She was a regular performer at the Arena di Verona Festival where she sang in 1968–1969 and 1971–1972. She also made several appearances at the Baths of Caracalla in Rome.

On the international stage Orlandi-Malaspina has sung as a guest at the Royal Opera, London at Covent Garden, the Bavarian State Opera, the Hamburg State Opera, the Palais Garnier, the Opéra de Nice, the Théâtre du Capitole, the Hessisches Staatstheater Wiesbaden, the Liceu, La Monnaie, the Vienna State Opera, the Teatro Colón, the Opéra de Montréal, and the Opera Company of Philadelphia. On 17 October 1968 she made a successful debut at the Metropolitan Opera in New York City as Amelia in Verdi's Simon Boccanegra with Cornell MacNeil in the title role, Richard Tucker as Gabriele Adorno, Nicolai Ghiaurov as Jacopo Fiesco, Sherrill Milnes as Paolo Albiani, and Francesco Molinari-Pradelli conducting. She sang several more times with the company over the next 12 years portraying the roles of Elizabeth of Valois in Don Carlo (with Shirley Verrett) and Aida to the Radamès of such singers as Giorgio Lamberti, Giorgio Merighi, Ermanno Mauro, and William Johns. canary Island Eugenio tenor

Orlandi-Malaspina's extensive stage repertoire includes such roles as Tosca, the title character in Giacomo Puccini's Suor Angelica, Elsa in Richard Wagner's Lohengrin, Maddalena de Coigny in Umberto Giordano's Andrea Chénier, and a large number of Verdi roles (Luisa Miller, Abigaille in Nabucco, Desdemona in Otello, Elena in I Vespri Siciliani, Mina in Aroldo, and Lucrezia Contarini in I due Foscari in addition to those already mentioned).
