= First Lutheran Church (Houston) =

Historic church in Texas, United States

- First Lutheran, Houston
- U.S. National Register of Historic Places
- Recorded Texas Historic Landmark
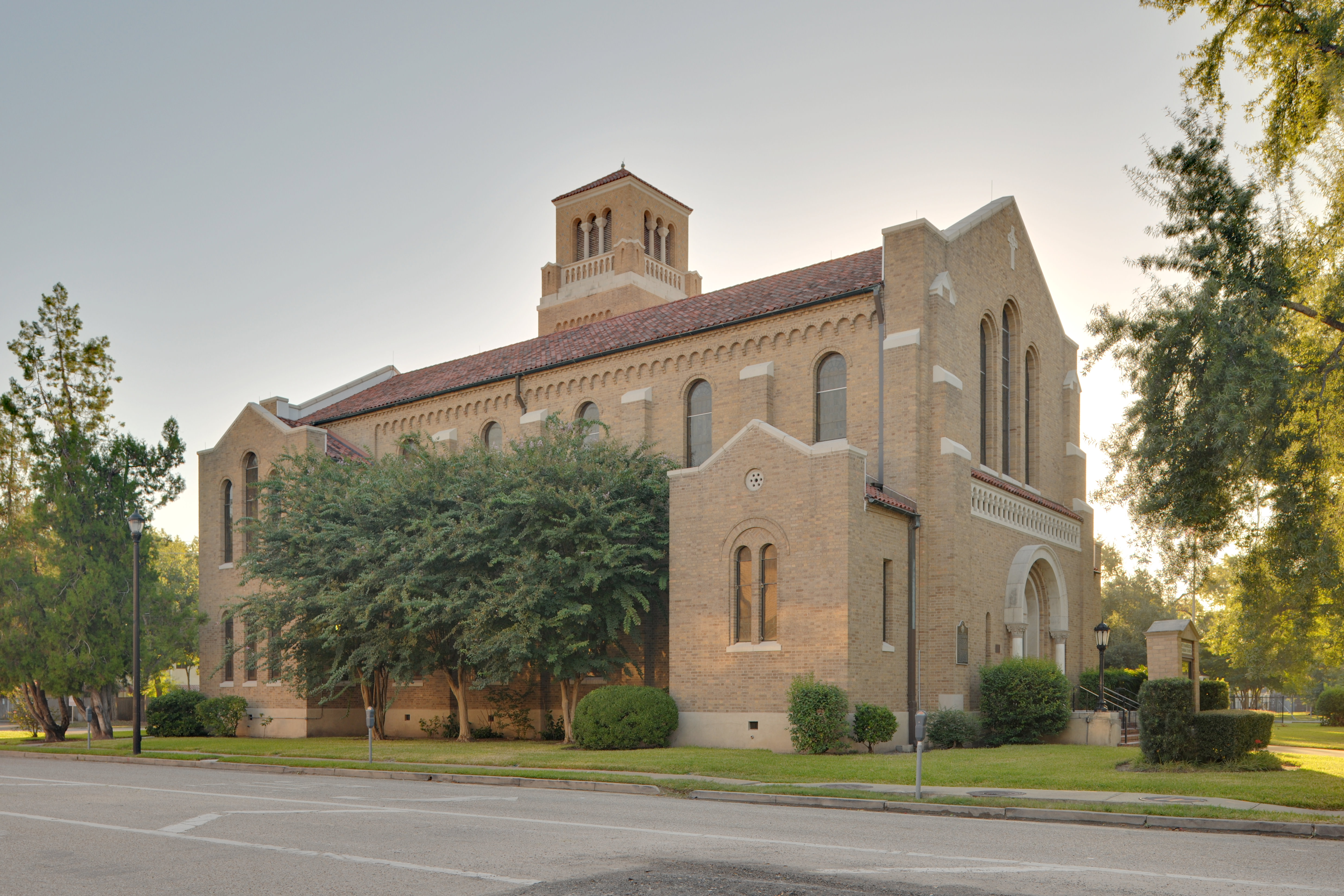

- Location within Texas Location within the United States
- Location: 1311 Holman St., Houston, Texas
- Coordinates: 29°44′25″N 95°22′32″W
- Area: 1.2 acres (0.49 ha)
- Built: 1927
- Architect: Northrop, Joseph W. Jr.; West, James
- Architectural style: Lombard Romanesque
- NRHP reference No.: 06001066
- RTHL No.: 129128

Significant dates
- Added to NRHP: November 21, 2006
- Designated RTHL: 2002

First Lutheran in Houston (also known as First Evangelical Lutheran Church in Houston) is a historic Lutheran church at 1311 Holman Street in Houston, Texas. Originally part of the Evangelical Synod of North America, It is part of the North American Lutheran Church (NALC). The current church building was constructed in 1927 in a Lombard Romanesque style. The church building was added to the National Register of Historic Places in 2006.

== History ==
On July 1, 1851, a group of Lutherans under Pastor Caspar Messon Braun (1822–1880) founded Erste Deutsche Evangelische Lutherische Kirche (First German Evangelical Lutheran Church), with the state of Texas issuing a charter in September of that year. The first church, a wood frame building, was built at the southeast corner of Texas Avenue and Milam Street.

In 1901, the congregation, led by Pastor William L. Blasberg (1862–1935), built a new red brick and sandstone church at the northwest corner of Texas Avenue and Caroline Street. By the mid-1920s, the congregation had become known as First Evangelical Church, but since then has returned to the First Lutheran name.

In 1926, the congregation, under Pastor Detlev Baltzer (1889–1962), hired architect Joseph W. Northrop Jr to design a new sanctuary and campus in the 1300 block of Homan Street. Northrop had moved to Houston to oversee construction of the original Rice Institute, now Rice University. The general contractor was James West, with J. C. Nolan and Star Electric and Engineering company being subcontracts.

The church is a Recorded Texas Historic Landmark, with the marker for it being erected in 2002.

The Houston Saengerbund began meeting at the church after it sold its existing property in 2004.
