= Adele Rowland =

American actress (1883–1971)

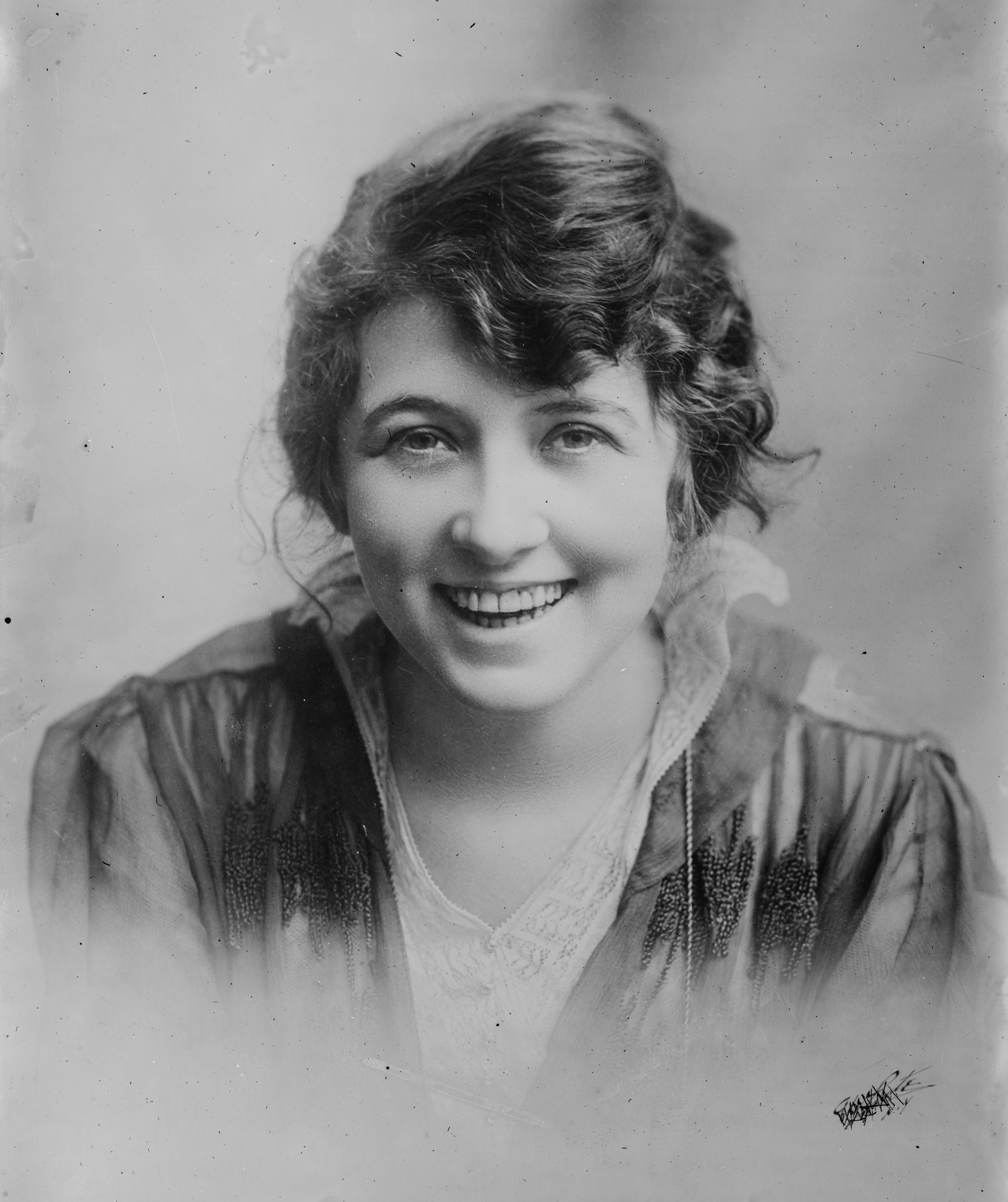
- Rowland, c. 1916
- Born: Adele P. Levi; July 10, 1883; Washington, D.C., U.S.
- Died: August 8, 1971 (aged 88); Los Angeles, California, U.S.
- Occupation: Actress
- Years active: 1904–1950
- Spouses: Charlie Ruggles (m. 1914; div. 1916) Conway Tearle (m. 1918; died 1938)
- Relatives: Mabel Rowland (sister)

Adele Rowland (born Adele P. Levi; July 10, 1883 – August 8, 1971) was an American actress and singer.

== Biography ==
She was born on July 10, 1883, as Adele P. Levi in Washington, D.C., the youngest daughter of Abraham D. Levi and Addie (Lloyd) Levi. She had a sister, Mabel Rowland, who was an actress, monologist, producer and director, and a brother, Harmon L. Rowland, a real estate broker in Los Angeles, California.

Rowland performing in a 1928 Vitaphone Varieties short

A soprano, Rowland was a standout in musical comedy productions from 1904, specializing in "story songs". In 1914 she created the role of the soubrette Patsy in Victor Herbert's The Only Girl. She was best known for her rendition of the song "Pack Up Your Troubles in Your Old Kit-Bag", which she introduced in 1915 in the Broadway production of Her Soldier Boy. The 1919 musical The Lady in Red was created as a starring vehicle for her by playwright Anne Caldwell. In that production she introduced a new song by George Gershwin, "Something About Love", which contained lyrics by Lou Paley.

Rowland later moved to Los Angeles. In 1935 she presented her stage talents for the film world at Harold Lloyd's organization, the Beverly Hills Little Theatre for Professionals, in John Entenza's play "A Notorious Lady", starring Paul De Ricon, Lora Treadwell, Grace Hale, and Robert Hoover, and directed by Alexander Leftwich. The theatre had been specifically organized as such a showcase. She made a career playing small parts in motion pictures, acting well into the 1950s.

== Personal life ==
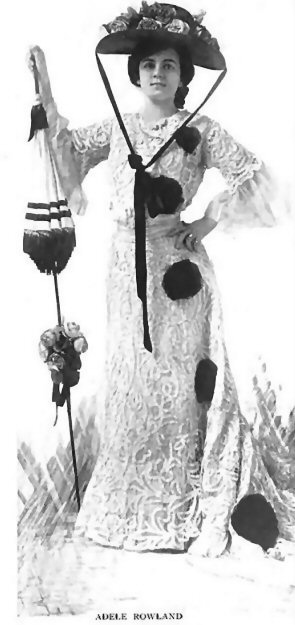
Adele Rowland, c. 1904

She married actor Charlie Ruggles in 1914 and they divorced in 1916. She married stage and film actor Conway Tearle in 1918; he died in 1938.

== Death ==
She died on August 8, 1971, in Los Angeles.

== Filmography ==
- 1950 The Secret Fury
- 1948 For the Love of Mary
- 1948 The Big Punch
- 1942 Lucky Legs
- 1942 A Tragedy at Midnight
- 1941 The Blonde from Singapore
- 1928 Stories in Song
