= Herman Spielter =

American composer

Herman Spielter (April 26, 1860 – November 10, 1925) was an American composer born in Germany who came to the United States in 1880. He wrote cantatas and other works for choir as well as some chamber music.
