= Pehk =

Surname list

Pehk is an Estonian surname. Notable people with the surname include:

- Erki Pehk (born 1968), Estonian conductor
- Heino Pehk (1940–2025), Estonian choir conductor
- Jaan Pehk (born 1975), Estonian writer and singer
