= Anzhelina Shvachka =

Ukrainian operatic mezzo-soprano singer

Anzhelina Shvachka Анжелина Алексеевна Швачка Shevchenko National Prize laureate
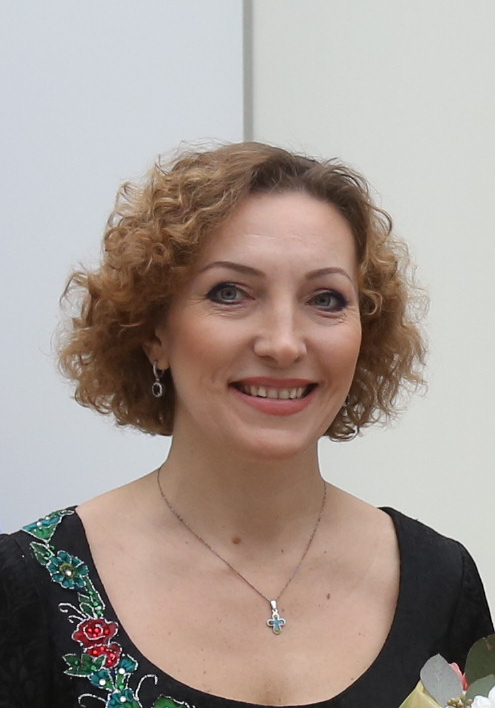
- Shvachka in 2016

Background information
- Born: July 17, 1971 (age 55); Dnipro, Ukraine
- Genre: Opera
- Occupation: Opera singer (mezzo-soprano)

Anzhelina (Note: Also transcribed as "Angelina") Alekseevna Shvachka (Ukrainian: Анжеліна Олексіївна Швачка, romanized: Anzhelina Olesiivna Shvachka; Russian: Анжелина Алексеевна Швачка, born in 1971) is a Ukrainian operatic mezzo-soprano singer. She is a leading soloist of the National Opera of Ukraine in Kyiv, where she started in 1997.

== Career ==
Shvachka was born in Dnipro, Ukraine. She is the prizewinner of Klaudia Taev Competition in 2005. After that, she was invited to perform numerous times at the Pärnu International Opera Music Festival PromFest in Estonia and abroad. Some notable roles were the title role in Carmen (2007), Lyubasha in The Tsar's Bride (2013), and Amneris in Aida (2015).

She recorded Prince Igor with the NRCU Symphony Orchestra under Theodore Kuchar in 2005, and Robert Ian Winstin's Oedipus Requiem with the Kyiv Philharmonic in 2007.

== Awards ==
- Taras Shevchenko National Prize of Ukraine (2016)

== Notes and references ==
Notes
