= Teet Kask =

Estonian choreographer (born 1968)

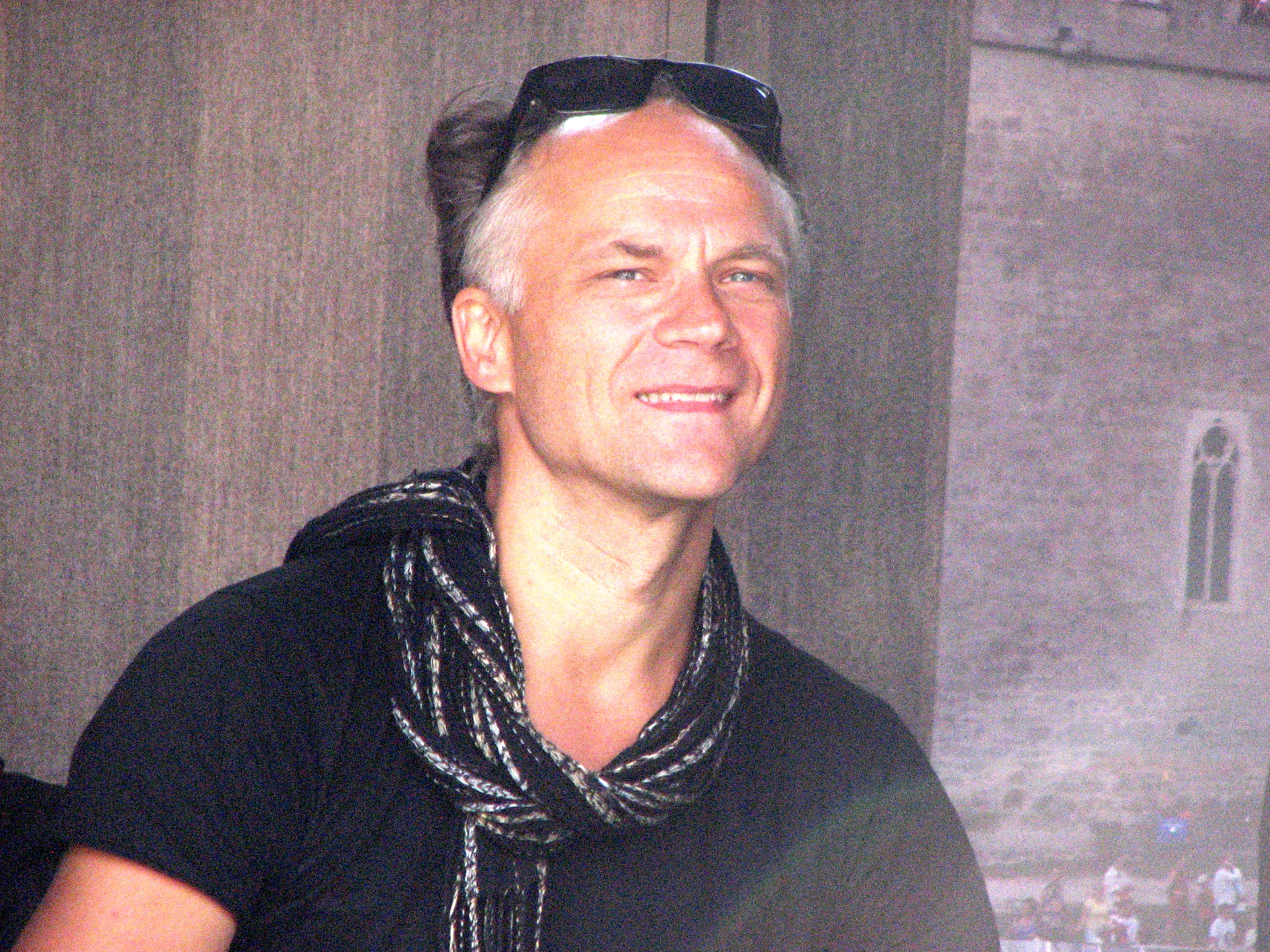
Kask in 2013

Teet Kask (born 8 May 1968 in Pärnu) is an Estonian choreographer.

== Overview ==
In 1978, he joined the Tallinn Ballet School, where he studied Vaganova classical ballet.

At 18 years old, he had leading roles in the Estonian National Ballet.

A turning point for Kask came when he was engaged by The Royal Swedish Ballet, in 1989, as the first Estonian ballet artist to work full-time in West before the Iron Curtain fell in 1991.

In 1990, he was invited to work with the Norwegian National Ballet.

In 1997, parallel with dancing, Kask began to work as a freelance choreographer.

In 2005, he graduated from City University London/Trinity Laban Conservatoire of Music and Dance with a Master of Arts in choreography.

=== Choreographer and director ===
2014

- Clocks'n'Clouds ballet, The Norwegian National Ballet, Oslo, Norway
- Baan Sirin concert-performance, Bangkok, Thailand
- Grüne Woche opening concert-ceremony director, Berlin, Germany

2013

- Tsar's Bride Rimsky-Korsakov's opera director, PromFest and Kaunas State Musical Theatre
- Big Stage Azerbaijan National TV program director

2012

- Oliver musical for State Opera of Georgia and Rustaveli Theatre, Tbilisi, Georgia
- Eunoto for State Ballet of Georgia, Tbilisi, Georgia
- Motus II for State Ballet of Georgia, Tbilisi, Georgia
- Tampopo for Nina Ananiashvili's 30 Years on Stage Celebration and State Ballet of Georgia, Tbilisi, Georgia

2011

- Exitus for ETA – Estonia Dance Agency, Tallinn, Estonia
- A Wingless Flight Into the Darkness for State Ballet of Georgia, Tbilisi, Georgia
- Father Hunger for STÜ – Independent Dance Union, Tallinn, Estonia

2010

- Joanna tentata Birgitta Festival, Tallinn, Estonia
- The Sound of Water Says What I think Royal Holloway, London, UK

2008

- Consecration of Tallinn Airport, Estonia
- Games On the Grass Nargen Opera, Estonia
- Plough- Shaped Era Pärnu Concert Hall, Estonia

2007

- w.o.r.k. in progress II Tartu, Viljandi, Pärnu, Estonia
- w.o.r.k. in progress I Viljandi, Pärnu, Estonia

2006

- Scope at The Oslo National Academy of the Arts, Norway

2005

- Sad Pleasure at The Place Theatre, London
- Amor Vincit Omnia at Bonnie Bird Theatre, London
- To Fish for Candid Arts Gallery, London

2004

- Female Interfaces at Centre Pompidou, Paris
- Fluxus for the European Art channel Mezzo under European Classics, Paris
- Distant Buddha at The Oslo National Academy of the Arts, Norway
- Forever at Moscow Youth Theatre, Russia

2003

- Tango for Estonian Drama Company, Tallinn
- Ithaka for David Oistrakh Music Festival in Pärnu, Estonia

2002

- Runo the interval act for Eurovision Song Contest Tallinn, Estonia
- Fluxus for Vanemuine Ballet Company, Tartu, Estonia
- Magic Mountain for Tallinn City Drama Company, Estonia

2001

- Shadowgraph at Black Box Theatre, Oslo
- Peer Gynt for Eurovision Dance Competition, London
- Lighthouse with Estonia National Opera and Ballet Company

2000

- Silent Areas at Hair 2000, Oslo

1999

- Gips for Vigeland Museum with photographer Knut Bry, Oslo
- Dream Sequence for multimedia artist Pia Myrvold, Paris
- Ursula X for Estonian National Ballet, Tallinn

1998

- Duo for Nina Ananiashvili and Bolshoi Stars Japan Tour 1998
- Pling i Bollen for Norwegian food-artist Trond Moi, Henie-Onstad Art Centre, Oslo
- Primum Mobile for Norwegian photographer Knut Bry, Oslo
- Post Machine for Norwegian multimedia artist Pia Myrvold, Oslo

1997

- Veritas Vos Liberabit for The Norwegian National Opera Ballet School, Oslo
- Two at Nille Dance School, Oslo

1996

- Time To ... for The Norwegian National Ballet, Oslo

=== Ballet companies worked with ===
- 2004, 2014 - Vanemuine Theatre Ballet
- 2011–2012 – The State Ballet of Georgia
- 1990–2004 – The Norwegian National Ballet
- 1989–1990 – The Royal Swedish Ballet
- 1986–1989 – The Estonian National Ballet

=== Producer/artistic consultant ===
- 2009/2010 – artistic consultant for the visual aesthetics, graphics and cultural programme for 30th International Hanseatic Days (24.-27.06.2010 in Pärnu, Estonia)
- 2009/2010 – artistic consultant for the conception developing and planning of 11th Estonian Youth Dance and Song Festival in 2011 for organising team-Eesti Laulu- ja Tantsupeo SA
- 2008 – producer of c.o.n.t.est08 - Competition of Nonverbal Theatre in Pärnu, Estonia
- 2007 – invited participant of International Festival of Non-Verbal Theatre Personal Profile Moscow, Russia by Moscow Dance Agency TSEH
- 2006/2007 – Estonian producer in the international contemporary dance project "The Migrant Body" (Estonia, Italy, the Netherlands, Romania, the UK)
- 2005/2006 – artistic director and producer of the White Nights Festival, Estonia
- 2002–2004 – consultant for music and dance programs of the Estonian Television (ERR)
- 2002 – choreographer and producer of the Interval Act of the Eurolaul 2002
- 2001 – founder, producer and director of the production company Motion ArtPro, Norway
- 1997–2000 – founder and producer of Stage Fight Courses at Pärnu Endla Theatre, Estonia
- 1995 – tour manager of the Swedish dance company "Pullet Proof"

=== Tutorial work ===
- 2011 – Estonian Dance Agency (ETA, Tallinn, Estonia)
- 2009 – Baltic Movement Workshop (Club ZAK Gdansk, Poland)
- 2008 – University of Tartu Viljandi Culture Academy, Estonia
- 2006 – Tallinn University, Estonia
- 2005 - 2006 – White Nights Festival in Pärnu, Estonia
- 2002 - – The Oslo National Academy of the Arts (KHiO), Norway

=== Awards ===
1999 – title of "outstanding male dancer" by the Critics Survey of Ballet International/Tanz Aktuell International

=== Appearances as a dancer ===
- Man (Babels Barn/Child of Babylon, choreography by Kjersti Alveberg)
- Pair 2 (Holberg Suite, choreography by Ib Andersen)
- White (Monotones, choreography by Sir Frederick Ashton)
- Drosselmayer (Nutcracker, choreography by Dinna Bjørn)
- Tybalt (Romeo and Juliet, choreography by Michael Corder)
- Jean (Miss Julie, choreography by Birgit Cullberg)
- Death (Vier Letzte Lieder, choreography by Rudi van Dantzig)
- Edvard Munch (Between Amor and Psyche, choreography by Anders Døving)
- Rothbart (Swan Lake, choreography by Anna-Marie Holmes)
- Roles in performances: Stoolgame, Heart's Labyrinth, Stamping Ground (choreography by Jiri Kylian)
- Oedipus (Sphinx), Young Husband (La Ronde), Roles in performances: Mythical Hunters, Rite of Spring (choreography by Glen Tetley)
- Demetrius (A Midsummer Night's Dream, choreography by Robert Sund)
