= Klaudia Taev =

Estonian vocal pedagogue

Klaudia Taev (13 April 1906 in Saaremaa – 7 June 1985 in Pärnu) was an Estonian vocal pedagogue.

Born into a teacher's family on the Estonian island of Saaremaa, she studied as an opera singer at the Tallinn Conservatoire, under the tutorage of Aino Tamm, the first professional opera singer in Estonia.

During World War II, she taught singing in Yaroslavl, and her students included the famous Estonian baritone, Georg Ots. Later, other well-known Estonian singers Urve Tauts, Silvia Vestmann, Hans Miilberg, Viktor Gurjev, Asta Vihandi studied under her.

Taev died on 7 June 1985, due to an illness. She is remembered through an international competition for opera singers named after her - the Klaudia Taev Competition.
