= Tatjana Romanova-Vorontsova =

Russian opera singer

Tatjana Romanova-Vorontsova (until 1998 Romanova; Russian: Татьяна Романова-Воронцова; born on 5 July 1973 in Pomara, Mari El Republic) is a Russian soprano opera singer.

In 2000 she graduated from Estonian Music Academy. From 1998 until 2001 she was a visiting soloist, and from 2001 until 2003 a soloist at Vanemuine Theatre in Estonia. Since 2003, she is working at Finnish National Opera.

She was graduated in 1993, majoring in singing and music theory. She was married to singer Alexey Voronstov.

Awards:

- 2003: 2nd prize in Klaudia Taev Competition

== Roles ==
- Gilda (Verdi, Rigoletto, 1998)
- Lucia (Donizetti, Lucia di Lammermoor, 1999)
- Leonora (Nielsen Maskarade, 1999)
