= PromFest =

International opera festival held in Pärnu, Estonia

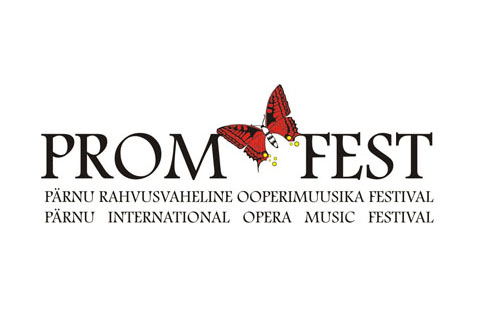
PromFest logo

PromFest is an international opera festival held biennially in Pärnu, Estonia, since 1996. PromFest stands for Pärnu International Opera Music Festival in Estonian.

The main attraction of PromFest is an operatic production, in which the leading roles are performed by prizewinners from previous Klaudia Taev Competitions.

The artistic director of PromFest is conductor Erki Pehk.

== History ==
Year	Competition	Program
1996	1st	Memorial concert
2001	2nd	Memorial concert Final concert of the competition
2003	3rd	Opera production: Rigoletto by G.Verdi (stage director Linnar Priimägi); Memorial concert Final concert of the competition
2005	4th	Opera production: Demon by Anton Rubinstein (stage director Mati Unt); Mozart masterclass by Prof. Ingrid Kremling; Concert of Alexander Vedernikov; Memorial concert Final concert of the competition
2007	5th	Opera production: Carmen by G.Bizet (stage director Marko Matvere); Concert of Barbara Hendricks; Concert of Yevgeny Nesterenko; Masterclass of Ingrid Kremling; Memorial concert Final concert of the competition
2009	6th	Opera production: Thaïs by J.Massenet (stage director Mai Murdmaa); Solo concert of Vladimiras Prudnikovas; Masterclass of Teresa Żylis-Gara; Memorial concert Final concert of the competition
2011	7th	Opera production: Attila by G.Verdi (stage director Üllar Saaremäe); Opera evening with Mati Palm; Masterclass of Ingrid Kremling; PromFest Cinema: Thaïs by Massenet and Rigoletto by Verdi; Exhibition about the history of PromFest; Memorial concert Final concert of the competition
2013	8th	Opera production: The Tsar's Bride by Nikolai Rimsky-Korsakov (stage director Teet Kask); Masterclass of Edda Moser; Open lecture by Hans Nieuwenhuis; Cinema: Bizet's Carmen, Massenet's Thaïs and Verdi's Attila; Exhibition about the history of PromFest; Memorial concert Final concert of the competition
2015	9th	Opera production: Aida by G.Verdi (stage director Madis Nurms); Concert of Sergei Leiferkus; Open lecture by Hans Nieuwenhuis; An hour with Karan Armstrong; Memorial concert Final concert of the competition
2017	10th	Opera production: La traviata by G.Verdi (stage director Anu Lamp); PromFest Stars Gala; Open lecture by Hans Nieuwenhuis; Masterclass of Luana DeVol; Memorial concert Final concert of the competition
2019	11th	Opera productions: I Capuleti e i Montecchi by. V.Bellini (stage director Katrin Tegova); The Tsar's Bride by N.Rimsky-Korsakov (stage director Teet Kask); Aida by G.Verdi (stage director Madis Nurms); Open lecture by Hans Nieuwenhuis; Masterclass of Dolora Zajick; Final concert of the competition
2021	12th	Opera productions: Il turco in Italia by. G.Rossini (stage director Andrus Vaarik); Exhibition - Klaudia Taev 115; Lecture by Hans Nieuwenhuis; Masterclass of Cynthia Makris; Masterclass of Anna Samuil; Meet and Greet with Cynthia Makris; Final concert of the competition
2023	13th	Opera productions: Cendrillon by. J.Massenet (stage director Jüri Nael); Lecture by Hans Nieuwenhuis; Masterclass of Vesselina Kasarova; Meet and Greet with Vesselina Kasarova; Final concert of the competition
2025	14th	Opera productions: Adriana Lecouvreur by F. Cilea (stage director Marta Aliide Jakovski) Lecture by Hans Nieuwenhuis; Masterclass of Maria Guleghina; Meet and Greet with Maria Guleghina Workshop by Erkki Alste; Final concert of the competition

In addition to the biennial events, 2006 saw an Opera Gala, and 2008 a Puccini gala.
