= Émigré (oratorio) =

2023 American oratorio

- Oratorio by Aaron Zigman
- Text: Mark Campbell; Brock Walsh
- Language: English; Chinese; Hebrew; Latin
- Performed: November 17, 2023

Émigré is an oratorio composed by Aaron Zigman with lyrics by Mark Campbell and Brock Walsh. Set in 1930s Shanghai, it relates the story of a Jewish refugee who falls in love with a Chinese woman. It premiered on 17 November 2023 to mixed reviews.

== Background ==
In 2019, Chinese conductor Yu Long, director of the Shanghai Symphony Orchestra, reached out to Jewish-American composer Aaron Zigman to collaborate on a piece about Jewish refugees in Shanghai. Yu's grandfather, Ding Shande, had worked with and taught many Jewish musicians during the 1930s and 1940s; Yu desired to honor his grandfather with a production about it. Mark Campbell and Brock Walsh joined the project as lyricists. The oratorio was commissioned by both the Shanghai Symphony Orchestra and the New York Philharmonic. Zigman described the story as "a multicultural love story at the end of the day, and then a story of humanity, love, hope and acceptance through the tragedy of loss as well."

== Premise ==
In 1938, just days after Kristallnacht, two German Jewish brothers emigrate to Shanghai to escape mounting antisemitism in Germany. One of the brothers, Otto, is a rabbinical student who desires to keep his Jewish traditions. The other, Josef, a doctor, visits a Chinese herbal medicine shop, where he meets and falls in love with Lina, a woman whose mother was murdered during the Rape of Nanjing. The two marry in spite of their families' opposition to their union, but face many hardships.

== Cast ==
Roles, voice types, premiere cast
Role	Voice type	Premiere cast, 17 November 2023 Conductor: Yu Long
Josef Bader	tenor	Arnold Livingston Geis
Otto Bader	tenor	Matthew White
Li Song	mezzo-soprano	Zhu Huiling
Lina Song	soprano	Zhang Meigui
Wei Song	bass-baritone	Shenyang
Tovah Odesska	soprano	Diana Newman
Yaakov Odesska	bass-baritone	Andrew Dwan
Chorus: Jewish refugees, Shanghai citizens, etc.

== Performances ==
Émigré had its world premier in Shanghai on 17 November 2023. It received its US premiere on 29 February 2024, and is set to premiere in Beijing in October 2024, Berlin in November 2024, Hong Kong in April 2025, and London in June 2025. Deutsche Grammophon recorded the oratorio and released the recording on 2 February 2024.

== Reception ==
Émigré was hailed as "a sign of the power of cultural exchange between China and the United States", according to the New York Times.

A reviewer from the Financial Times praised the libretto, score, Yu's conducting and the singing of the actors; the reviewer criticized what he perceived as the oratorio's lack of definition.

Observer in a negative review called Émigré "pure schlock". Zachary Woolfe in a review for The New York Times called it "bland..."Émigré" is oratorio at its worst" and criticized the music, lyrics, pacing, and characterization.
