= Merle Silmato =

Estonian opera singer

Merle Silmato (born 1968) is an Estonian opera singer (contralto). She has been a member of the Finnish National Opera since 2007.

In 2001, she graduated from Estonian Music Academy. In 2006 she graduated from Sibelius Academy.

She continues to perform regularly with the Finnish National Opera while also undertaking guest engagements across Europe.

Awards:

- 2001: 3rd prize in Klaudia Taev Competition

== Roles ==
- Azucena (Verdi "Il trovatore", Vanemuine Theatre)
- Carmen (Bizet "Carmen")
- Tavern's woman (Estonian: kõrtsinaine) (Mussorgsky "Boriss Godunov", Estonia Theatre)
