= Mikhaylo Lomonosov =

- Russian: Михайло Ломоносов
- Directed by: Aleksandr Ivanov
- Written by: Leonid Rakhmanov
- Starring: Boris Livanov; Asta Vihandi; Vladimir Soshalsky; Vladimir Belokurov; Sergei Plotnikov
- Cinematography: Lev Sokolsky
- Music by: Venedikt Pushkov
- Release date: 1955
- Country: Soviet Union

Mikhaylo Lomonosov (Russian: Михайло Ломоносов) is a 1955 Soviet film directed by Aleksandr Ivanov.

== Plot ==
The film tells about the great Russian scientist Mikhailo Lomonosov, who, after completing his studies in Germany, returns to Russia, where he dreams of creating scientific centers and opening a university.

== Starring ==
- Boris Livanov as Mikhaylo Lomonosov
- Asta Vihandi as Elizaveta Lomonosova
- Vladimir Soshalsky as Shuvalov
- Vladimir Belokurov as Prokop Andreevitch
- Sergei Plotnikov as Archbishop
- Yuri Rodionov as Popovsky
- Aleksey Batalov as Muzhik
- Ants Eskola as Rikhman
- Janis Osis as Miller
- Alfred Rebane as Shumakher
