= Rothbart =

Rothbart, Rotbart or Rottbart is a surname of German origin. The members of this family have historically held notable positions in various governments, various ecclesiastical positions, and owned significant lands.

Notable people with the surname include:

- Franz Rotbart (1480–1570), first Protestant pastor in Görlitz, also known as the true reformer of Görlitz
- Alois Rotbart, Austrian Catholic priest
- Monsignor Josef Rothbart, Austrian Catholic priest and professor
- Georg Konrad Rothbart, German architect, Saxe-Coburg-Gotha court councillor, and Construction official in the service of Ernest II, Duke of Saxe-Coburg and Gotha
- Hans Rothbart, a German architect, knight, castle captain of Veste Coburg, head of the ducal private office and president of the ducal cabinet in the service of Alfred, Duke of Saxe-Coburg and Gotha
- Gustav Rothbart, German landowner, farmer, politician, Kreistag and Reichstag member
- Johann Lorenz Theodor Rothbart, oil painter, watercolor painter, draftsman, lithographer
- Davy Rothbart (born 1975), American writer and filmmaker
- Ferdinand Rothbart (1823–1899), German painter
- Michael Forster Rothbart, American photojournalist

Rotbart can also refer to:

- Pater Rotbart – nickname of Joachim Haspinger, a Capuchin priest who played a key role in the Tyrolean Rebellion of 1809
- a German form of the name Barbarossa of Emperor Frederick I.
- a German brand of razor, used by German soldiers during World War II
- a long-period comet C/1946 K1 (Pajdusakova-Rotbart-Weber)

== Fictional ==
- Baron von Rothbart, character from the ballet Swan Lake
