= Zhu Huiling =

Chinese opera singer (born 1982)

Zhu Huiling (Chinese: 朱慧玲; pinyin: Zhū Huìlíng; born 1982 in Shanghai) is a Chinese mezzo-soprano opera singer. She won 2nd prize at the 2005 Klaudia Taev Competition in Estonia. She has appeared as Maddalena in Rigoletto in Shanghai, as Carmen in Estonia, and in a ballet to Grieg's Peer Gynt for Ballett Zürich which was released on DVD. Zhu has also performed jazz. She appeared in Aaron Zigman's Emigré as Li Song.
