= Asta Vihandi =

Estonian opera singer, actress and dancer

- Born: Asta Kronberg; 21 July 1929; Tartu, Estonia
- Died: 5 March 1993 (aged 63); Tallinn, Estonia
- Occupation(s): Opera singer, actress, dancer
- Years active: 1947–1990
- Spouse(s): Oskar Vihandi (1947–1958); Aleksandr Mandrõkin

Asta Vihandi (born Asta Kronberg; 21 July 1929 – 5 March 1993) was an Estonian opera and operetta soprano, stage and film actress, and dancer whose career began in 1947 at the age of eighteen. Vihandi's longest engagement was at the Estonian National Opera, which lasted from 1950 until 1985. Later in life, she worked as an administrator for the National Philharmonic of the Estonian SSR.

== Early life and education ==
Asta Vihandi was born Asta Kronberg in Tartu to August and Lilli Kronberg (née Zoo). She had one sibling. Vihandi attended primary and secondary schools in Tartu, graduating from Tartu Secondary School No.5 in 1947. In 1946, she studied ballet at the Vanemuine Ballet Studio, and also took singing lessons in Pärnu under the instruction of vocal pedagogue Klaudia Taev and under instruction of Linda Saul and Elsa Maasik in Tallinn.

== Career ==
=== Stage ===
In 1947, shortly after graduating from secondary school, Vihandi began a year-long engagement at the Vanemuine theatre in Tartu as a soprano choral singer. The following year, she joined the Endla Theatre in Pärnu as an actress, dancer, and choral singer, leaving in 1950. Vihandi's longest engagement was as a prima donna with the Estonian National Opera in Tallinn, from 1950 until 1985, leaving to become an administrator of the National Philharmonic of the Estonian SSR (now, Eesti Kontsert).

=== Film ===
In addition to roles as an opera singer and stage actress, Vihandi also appeared in a number of roles in film, beginning with a leading role of Elizaveta Lomonosova in the 1955 Aleksandr Ivanov-directed Russian-language Soviet drama Mikhaylo Lomonosov. Notable appearances in Estonian-language films include the role of Heli in the 1957 drama Pöördel, the role of Luisa in the 1958 drama Esimese järgu kapten, and the role of Teele in the 1960 historical drama Perekond Männard. All three of which were produced by Tallinna Kinostuudio (now, Tallinnfilm) and directed by Vihandi's second husband Aleksandr Mandrõkin. In 1972, she had a small role in the popular Sulev Nõmmik-directed comedy television film Noor pensionär for Eesti Telefilm.

== Personal life ==
In 1947, at age eighteen, Asta Kronberg married singer, actor, and photographer Oskar Vihandi. The couple divorced in 1958. Later, she married director Aleksandr Mandrõkin. Vihandi had one child. She died in 1993, aged 63, and was interred at the Forest Cemetery in the Pirita district of Tallinn.

== Filmography ==
| Year | Title | Role | Notes |
|---|---|---|---|
| 1955 | Mikhaylo Lomonosov | Elizaveta Lomonosova | |
| 1957 | Pöördel | Heli | |
| 1958 | Esimese järgu kapten | Luiza Everling | |
| 1960 | Perekond Männard | Teele | |
| 1971 | Risk | Magda Zeller | |
| 1972 | Noor pensionär | | |
