= Erki Pehk =

Estonian conductor

- Born: 23 March 1968 (age 58); Võru, then part of Estonian SSR, Soviet Union
- Occupations: Conductor, artistic director
- Years active: 1991 – present
- Father: Heino Pehk
- Relatives: Sander Pehk (nephew)
- Awards: Estonian Theatre Union Musical Production Award (2010)
- Website: erkipehk.eu

Erki Pehk (born 23 March 1968) is an Estonian conductor and artistic director of opera music festival PromFest.

== Childhood ==
Erki Pehk was born in Võru, Estonia, in the family of Heino Pehk, an established music teacher and choir conductor. Erki started learning music (piano) at age six at the Võru Music school.

== Education ==
In 1982, he moved to Tallinn to study piano and choir conducting at the Tallinn Music High School. After graduating in 1986, he began studying choir conducting with Prof. Ants Üleoja and orchestra conducting with Peeter Lilje at the Tallinn Conservatoire (now Estonian Academy of Music). At the same time, before his graduation in 1993, he studied orchestra conducting at the Jāzeps Vītols Latvian Academy of Music with Paul Mägi (years 1992–1994). Erki Pehk has improved his musical skills in Kirill Kondrashin Conductors Masterclass in 1990 in Hilversum (teacher Hiroyuki Iwaki), then at the Interpretation Course in Stuttgart led by John Eliot Gardiner in 1991 and also in the opera course at the Guildhall School of Music and Drama in London with Prof. Mauritz Sillem in 1997.

== Career ==
During his student years, Erki Pehk conducted the semi-professional Tallinn Town Hall Chamber Choir (1989-1995) and was invited to teach choir conducting in 1991 at Tallinn Music High School, the same school where he graduated 5 years ago. Pehk taught young choir conductors for six years till 1997 until he dropped that position due to his increased workload in Estonian National Opera, where Pehk was working since 1994 till 2011 conducting operas, ballets, operettas and musicals like La traviata, Carmen, Rigoletto, La belle Hélène, The Firebird, Swan Lake, Sleeping Beauty, Giselle, Die Fledermaus, Die Lustige Witwe, Wiener Blut, Die Czardasfürstin, Hello, Dolly! and others.

At the same time, in January 2000, Erki Pehk formed the project-based 21st Century Orchestra in Tallinn to produce alternative music projects, with musical styles ranging from baroque to rock. Some notable concerts were with countertenor Max Emanuel Cenčić and violinist Tatiana Grindenko, the symphonic rock concert with the legendary Estonian rock group Ruja at the Song Festival Square in Tallinn, voluntary TV concert series dedicated to World AIDS Day with numerous Estonian and foreign musicians recorded in St.Charles Church (Kaarli Kirik) in Tallinn and participating in many large scale musical productions produced by Smithbridge Productions in Tallinn Linnahall (City Concert Hall) like La cage aux Folles (1999), Tanz der Vampire (2000), Les Misérables (2001), Miss Saigon (2002), Crazy for You (2004), Cinderella (2005) and other performances and concerts.

Since 2001, Erki Pehk has been the artistic director of Klaudia Taev Competition for young singers in Pärnu, Estonia. He had the idea of producing the opera as the main prize for the competition winners. After the first production of Rigoletto in 2003, due to the increased program capacity of the competition, he decided to create the Pärnu International Opera Music Festival - PromFest in 2005 and has remained its artistic director to the present time. During all this time after Rigoletto he has produced and conducted The Demon (2005), Carmen (2007), Thaïs (2009), Attila (2011), Tsar's Bride (2013), Aida (2015), La Traviata (2017), I Capuleti e i Montecchi (2019), Il turco in Italia (2021), Cendrillon (2023) and Adriana Lecouvreur (2025).

Erki Pehk has been the Permanent Guest Conductor of The Symphony Orchestra of the National State Television and Radio Company of the Republic of Belarus 2010–2017. The most active collaborations are with the Kaunas State Musical Theatre (since 2011) and the Ukrainian National Chamber Ensemble "Kyiv Soloists" (since 2016). Also, he has built up his reputation as an orchestra and opera conductor performing throughout Europe with music theatres of France (Opéra de Rennes, Angers-Nantes Opéra), Lithuania (Kaunas State Musical Theatre), Germany (Erfurt Theater), Bulgaria (Sofia Opera and Ballet, Burgas Opera and Varna Opera), Belarus (National Bolshoi Opera and Ballet Theatre), and working in Germany, the Netherlands (including a gala concert in Amsterdam Concertgebouw with Nederlands Opera Studio), Finland, Russia, Ukraine, Latvia, Hungary, Iceland, and France.

== Awards ==
For artistic achievements at the PromFest festival and for the production of Thaïs by Massenet, Erki Pehk was awarded the Estonian Theatre Union Musical Production Award in 2010.
