= Sindi, Estonia =

Town in Estonia

Sindi Sindi
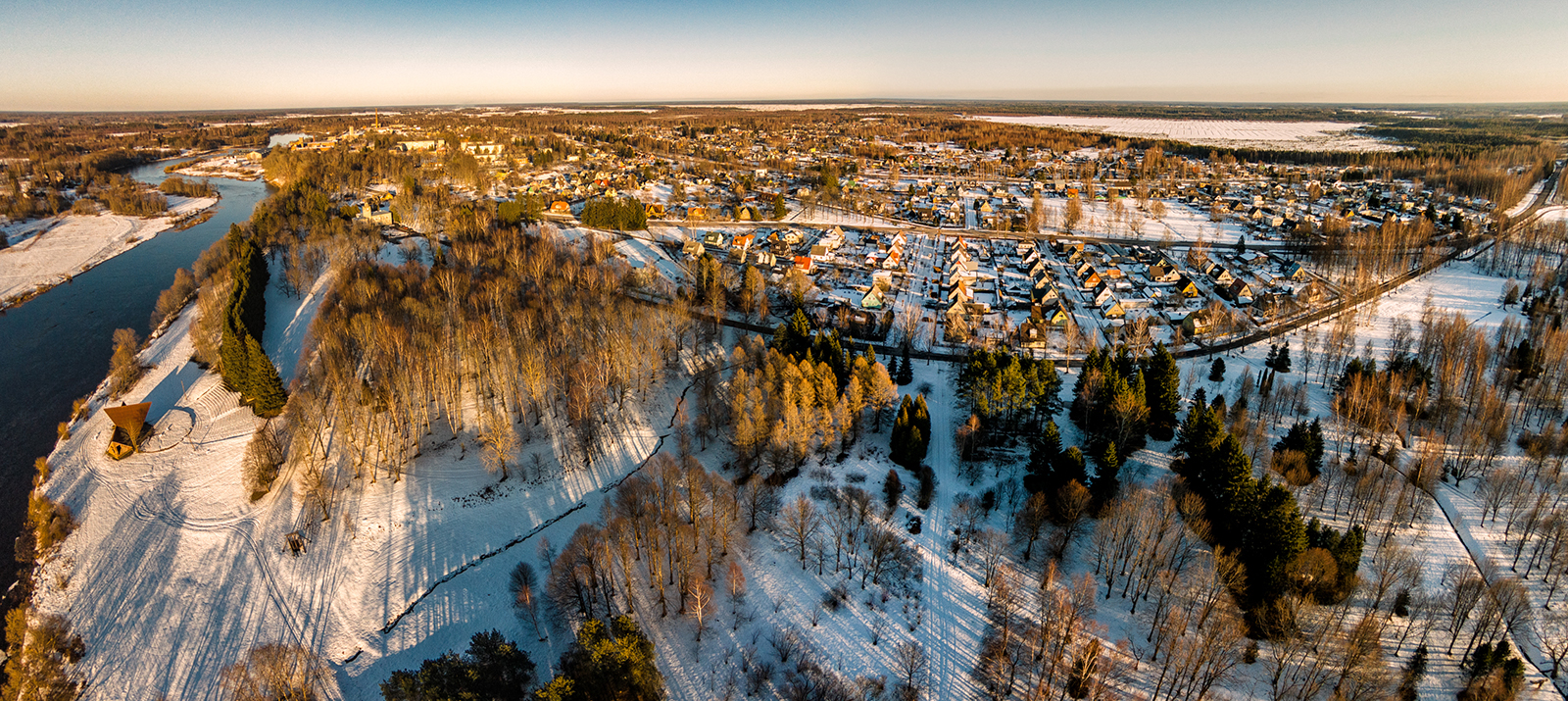

- Location in Estonia
- Coordinates: 58°24′2″N 24°40′3″E
- Country: Estonia
- County: Pärnu County
- Municipality: Tori Parish

Population (2026)
  - Total: 3,749
  - Rank: 27th

Ethnicity
  - Estonians: 81.1%
  - Russians: 14.8%
  - other: 4.1%
- Time zone: UTC+2 (EET)
  - Summer (DST): UTC+3 (EEST)

Sindi (German: Zintenhof) is a town in Tori Parish, in Pärnu County, Estonia, with a population of 3906 in 2017. It is located 14 kilometers from the county capital Pärnu, on the left coast of the Pärnu river.

== History ==
The area of what is now Sindi was the site of the Mesolithic settlement of Pulli, dating from around 8500 BCE – the oldest known settlement in Estonia. It was discovered by geologists in 1965. The settlement probably existed for a short period, as the area was later covered by water. As a swampy region, the area remained unpopulated until the 16th century.

The settlement was formed in 1833 around a textile factory owned by the manor. It officially became a borough in 1921 and a town in 1938.

Important to the town's development was the founding of a railway station in 1928. The railway operated until 1970.

Manor and factory settlement

Sindi Manor was a private manor located in the Tori Parish, about which there are written records from 1603. The later town did not grow out of the manor heart, but a little further away from the industrial settlement established on the banks of the Pärnu River. The manor heart was located on the banks of the Pärnu River in the area of the later vocational school and the Paikuse police school.

The Sindi workers' settlement arose in 1833 around the Sindi Kalevi factory, which was established on the area of the Saia and Tõela villages that belonged to the manor. The factory was founded by Riga merchant and industrialist Johann Christoph Wöhrmann (1784–1843), whose earlier Kalev factory in Sieradz had been burned down during the Polish uprising in 1831.

The Sindi Kalevi factory became one of the largest Kalevi factories in the Livonian and Estonian governorate, and a monofunctional industrial settlement was established around it.

The layout of the factory, the foremen's houses and the workers' barracks followed the principle of symmetry and hierarchy: the factory complex was located by the river, the workers' houses were located to the east of it and the foremen's houses to the south. By 1841, 57 houses had been completed in the settlement.

The oldest buildings of the current factory date from the time of its foundation, as well as some of the former foremen's houses and the Harmonie building, the officials' club.

In the mid-19th century, a mechanical department was built at the factory, where cast iron was also found, and a gas factory. These were among the earliest industrial enterprises of this type in Pärnu County.

Town and city

In 1921, Sindi received town rights. The further development of the settlement was boosted by the completion of the Lelle–Papiniidu railway section in 1928, when Sindi received a railway station. The narrow-gauge railway that passed through Sindi was in operation until 1969, when the railway was moved across the river to the other bank.

On May 1, 1938, Sindi became a third-tier city with the entry into force of the City Act. After receiving city rights, a more representative city center was planned for Sindi. The most important building of this plan was the Sindi Town Hall, the design of which was completed in 1935 and the building in 1937.

Soviet era and after the restoration of independence

In the years 1957–1991, Sindi was administratively part of the city of Pärnu. The city of Sindi became an independent local government unit on September 26, 1991.

With the 2017 administrative reform, a new Tori municipality was formed by merging Are rural municipality, Sauga rural municipality, Sindi city and the former Tori rural municipality.

The merger agreement entered into force on 11 November 2017. In the new rural municipality, Sindi remained the municipal center as a city within a rural municipality; the Tori rural municipality government is located in Sindi at 12 Pärnu mnt.

== Name ==
The town's name is derived from Clauss Zindt, a mayor of Pärnu in 1565, who founded a manor ( Zintenhof )where the town is now.In the late 1930s, during the Estonianing of names, the change of Sindi's name was considered.

On October 19, 1938, the Minister of the Interior ordered the City Government of Sindi to find a new name for the city on May 1, 1939. As this order was not met, the Pärnu county government extended the deadline until

July 1, 1940. As a new name, the press proposed, for example, the Blue River and Kalevi. However, the change of name did not fail.

== Geography ==
Sindi is located on the left bank of the Pärnu River, between the river and the wetland of Lanksaare. As Sindi is located in the lower reaches of the Pärnu River, its about 14 km from Pärnu.

The settlement has a elongated shape and its historic core was formed around the riverside factory complex. The location along the river Pärnu has affected both Sindi's economic history, industrial development and the later recreation and natural environment.

Next to the city is the Sindi Rapids, which was built to replace the former Sindi Dam. The expansion of the river Pärnu long prevented the migration of fish, as the dam was about 14 km from the estuary and closed access to much of the habitats of the Pärnu River.

The demolition of the dam began in October 2018, and by the summer of 2020, a natural crest was built to replace the concrete dam, organized outdoor swimming pool and fish spawning grounds.

== Population ==
The population of Sindi has been strongly linked to the development of the Sindi Kalevi Factory and the industrial settlement that developed around it.

During the Soviet era, the settlement had a significant proportion of industrial workers. In the 1970s and 1980s, the population of Sindi increased by over 4,000, and at the time of the 1989 census, 4,548 people lived in Sindi.

Later, the population has decreased; at the time of the 2011 census, 4,076 people lived in Sindi, and as of 1 January 2025, 3,766 people.

== Education ==
Sindi is home to Sindi Gymnasium, Sindi Music School named after Karl Ramm, and Sindi Kindergarten.

The beginning of school education in Sindi is considered to be 1837, when Johann Christoph Wöhrmann, the owner of the Sindi factory, opened an elementary school for the children of foreign workers. In 1841, a German school was opened in Sindi, and in 1857 the school was reorganized into an Estonian, German, and Russian educational institution. From 1887 to 1917, Estonia's first ministry school operated in Sindi. A three-story red brick schoolhouse was completed in 1901, which is the historical part of the later Sindi Gymnasium.

The beginning of kindergarten in Sindi is considered to be 1892, when Joseph Wulff, the director of the Sindi Kalevi Factory, founded a so-called soup school to care for the children of women recruited to work in the factory. Work began in the Sindi Karskusselts hall, where over a hundred children were placed, and the costs were borne by the factory.

In 1894, official permission to open a kindergarten was received from the Riga Educational District; this year is considered the official opening year of the Sindi Kindergarten.

== Religion ==
The Sindi Lutheran Church and the Sindi Orthodox Church are located in the city. An independent congregation was established for the Sindi Orthodox, many of whom were associated with the Kalevi factory, in 1896. In 1899, the red-brick Sindi Epiphany Church was completed, the construction of which was financed by the Moscow merchant R. Schön and the Sindi Kalevi factory. The church was consecrated by the Bishop of Riga, Agafangel.

== Notable people ==
- Julius Seljamaa (1883–1936), politician and diplomat, Minister of Foreign Affairs, 1933 to 1936
- Juho Matsalu (1911–1987), footballer, played 14 matches for Estonia from 1937 to 1940.
- Uno Palu (1933-2024), decathlete, finished fourth in decathlon at the 1956 Summer Olympics
- Hans Miilberg (1945–2020), baritone opera singer
- Marko Šorin (born 1974), politician, Mayor of Sindi from 2011 to 2016
- Allar Raja (born 1983), rower, team bronze medallist at the 2016 Summer Olympics
- The Tuberkuloited (formed 1991), rock band originally from Sindi

== Gallery ==
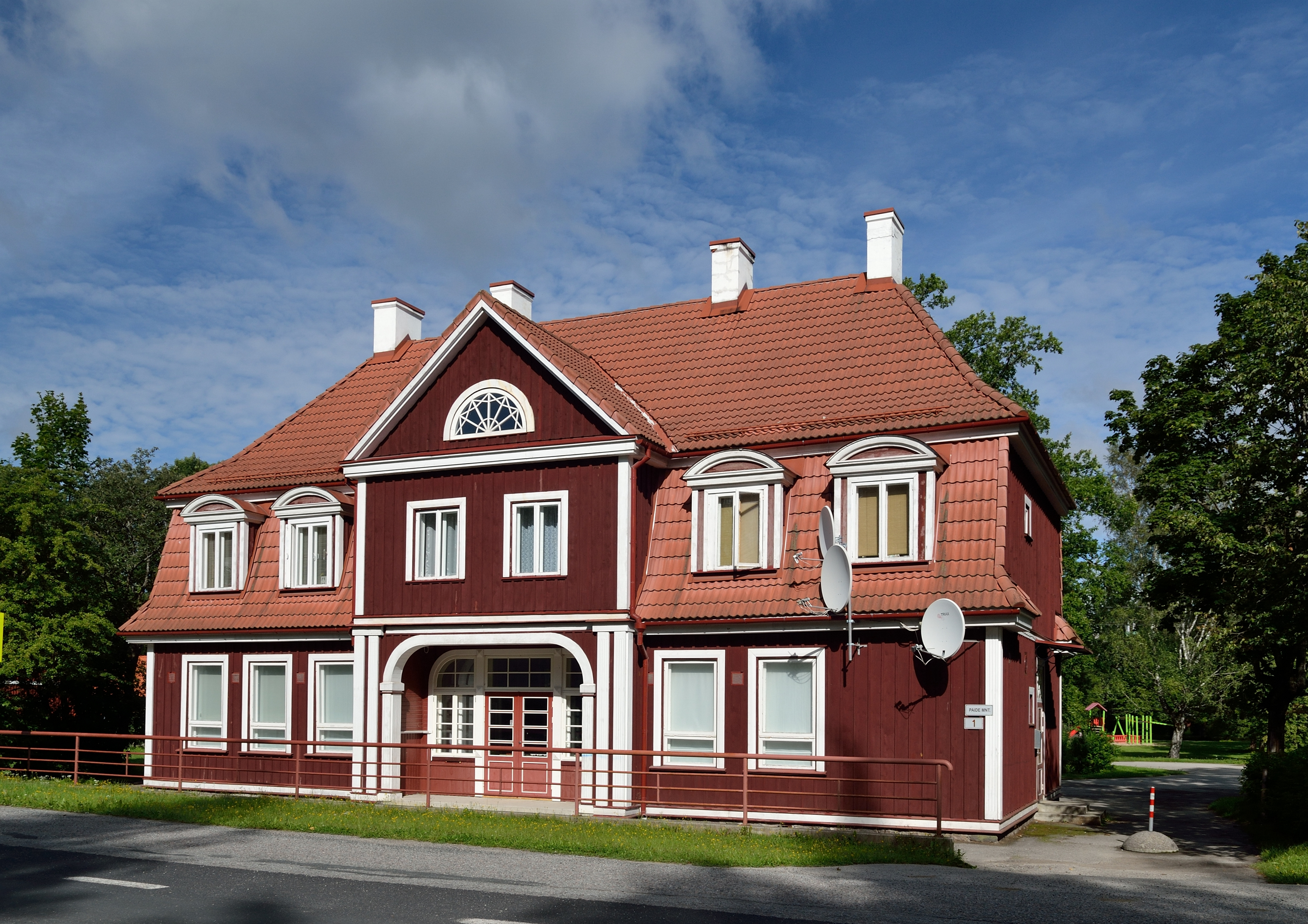
Railway station building

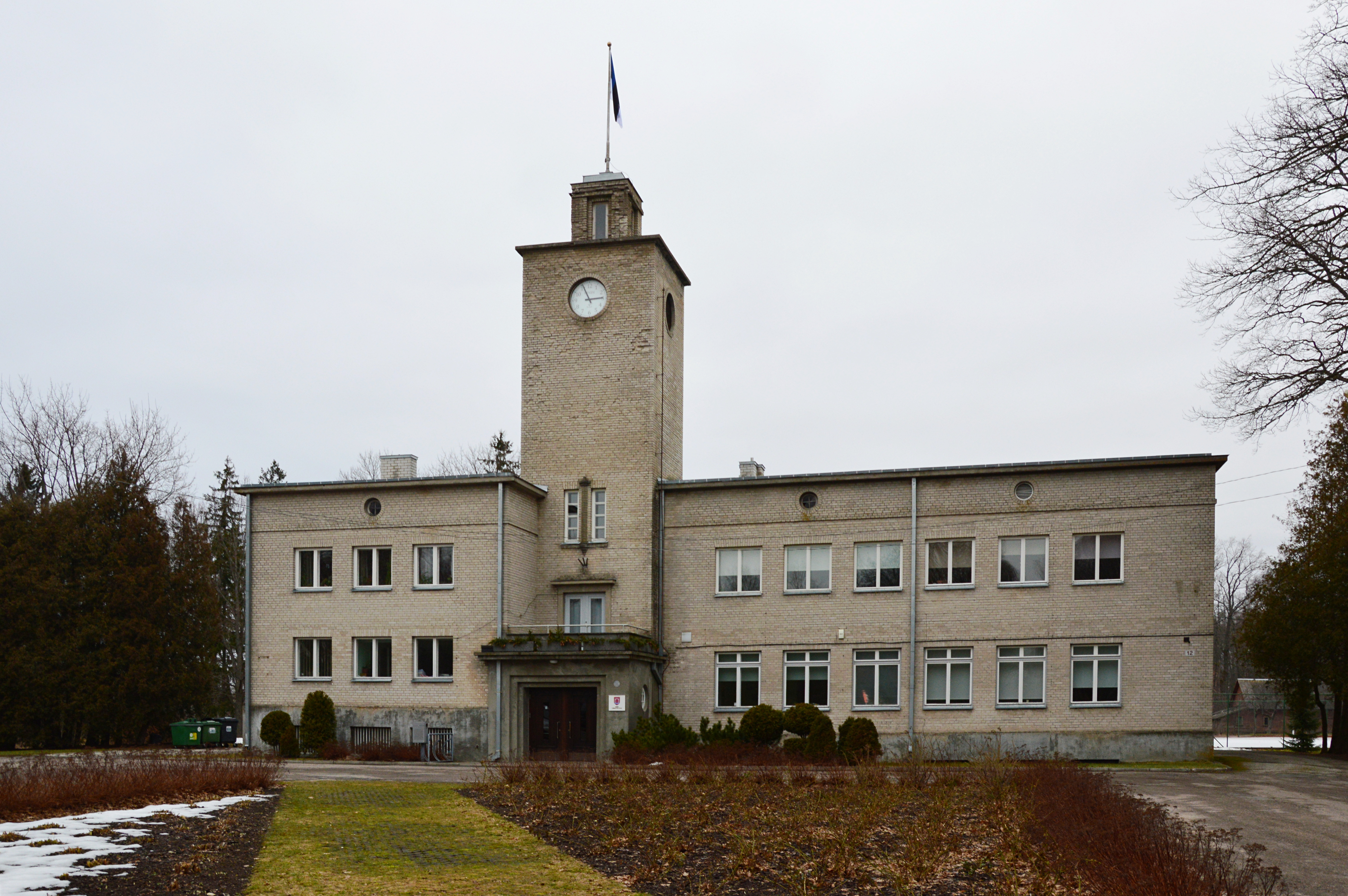
Town hall of Sindi

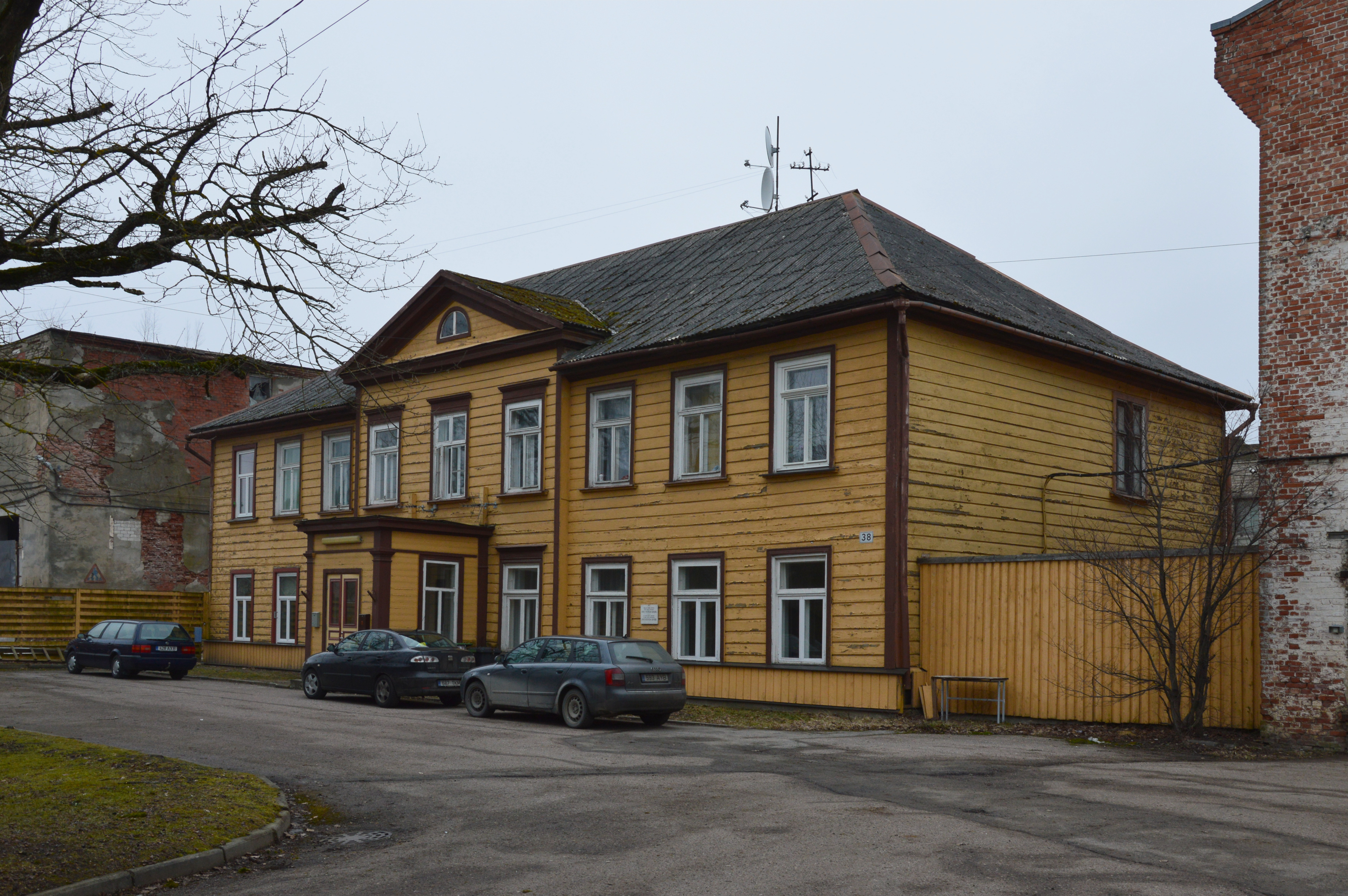
Historical Sindi schoolhouse

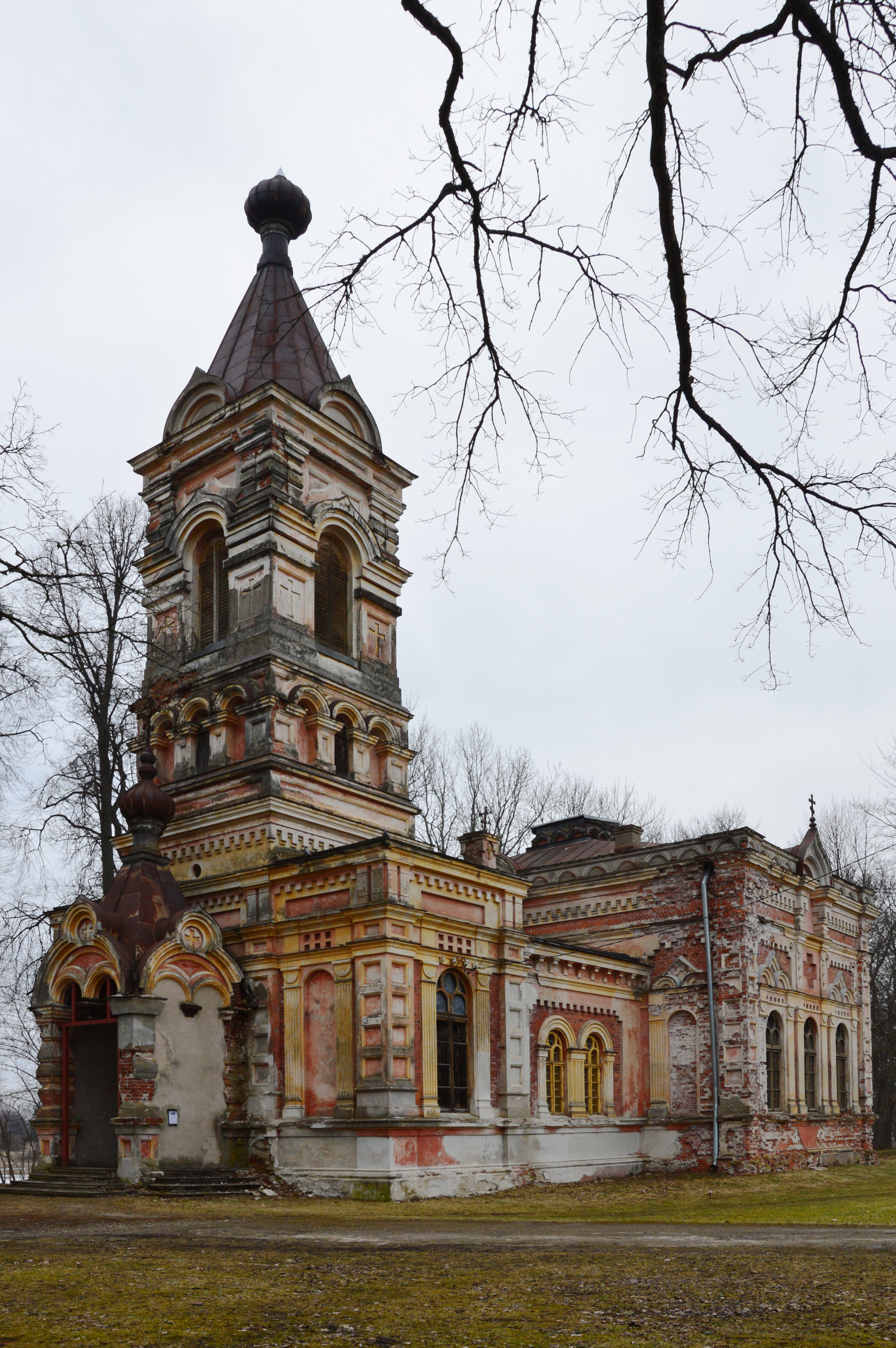
Sindi Eastern Orthodox church

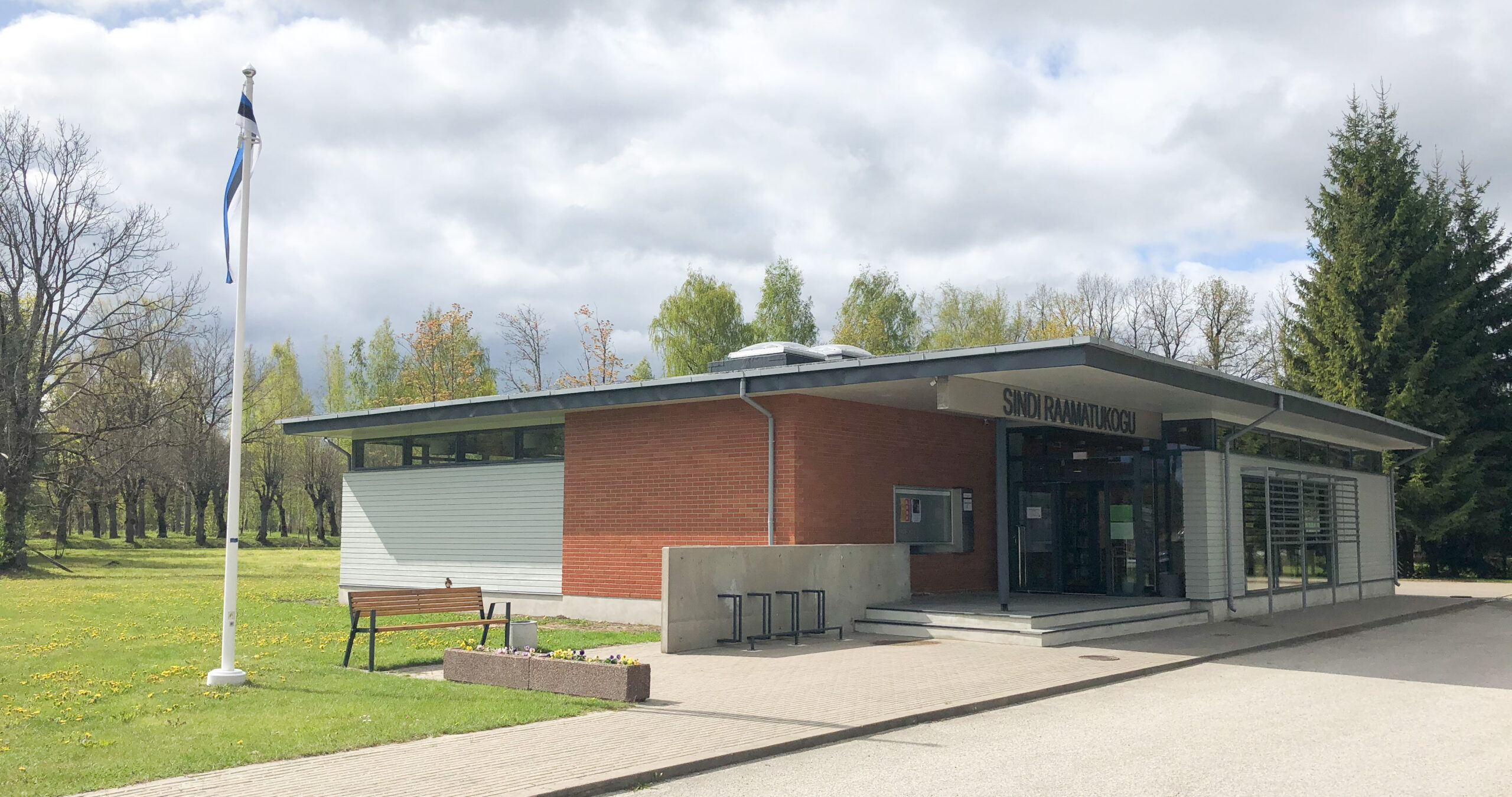
Sindi library

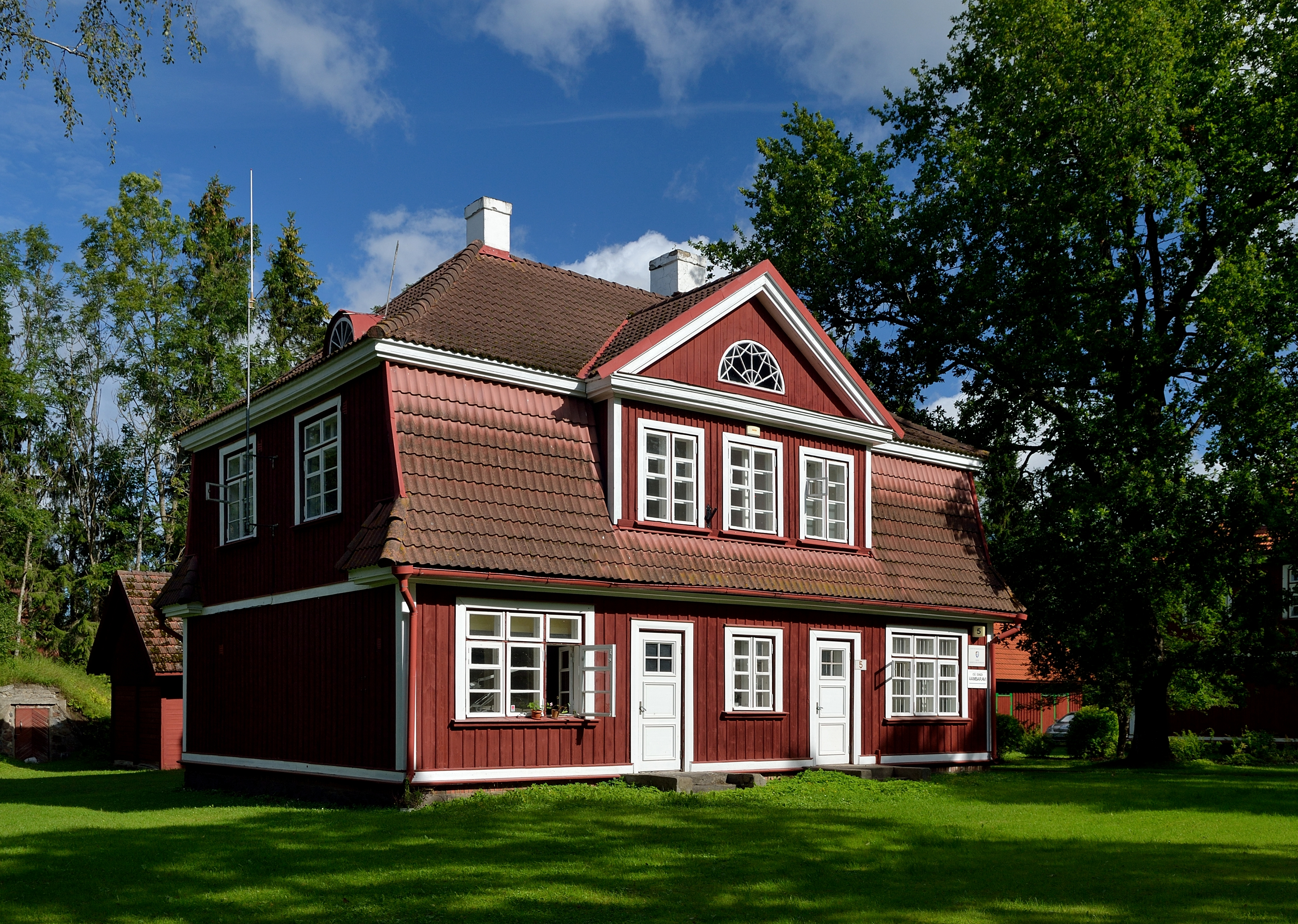
Residential building

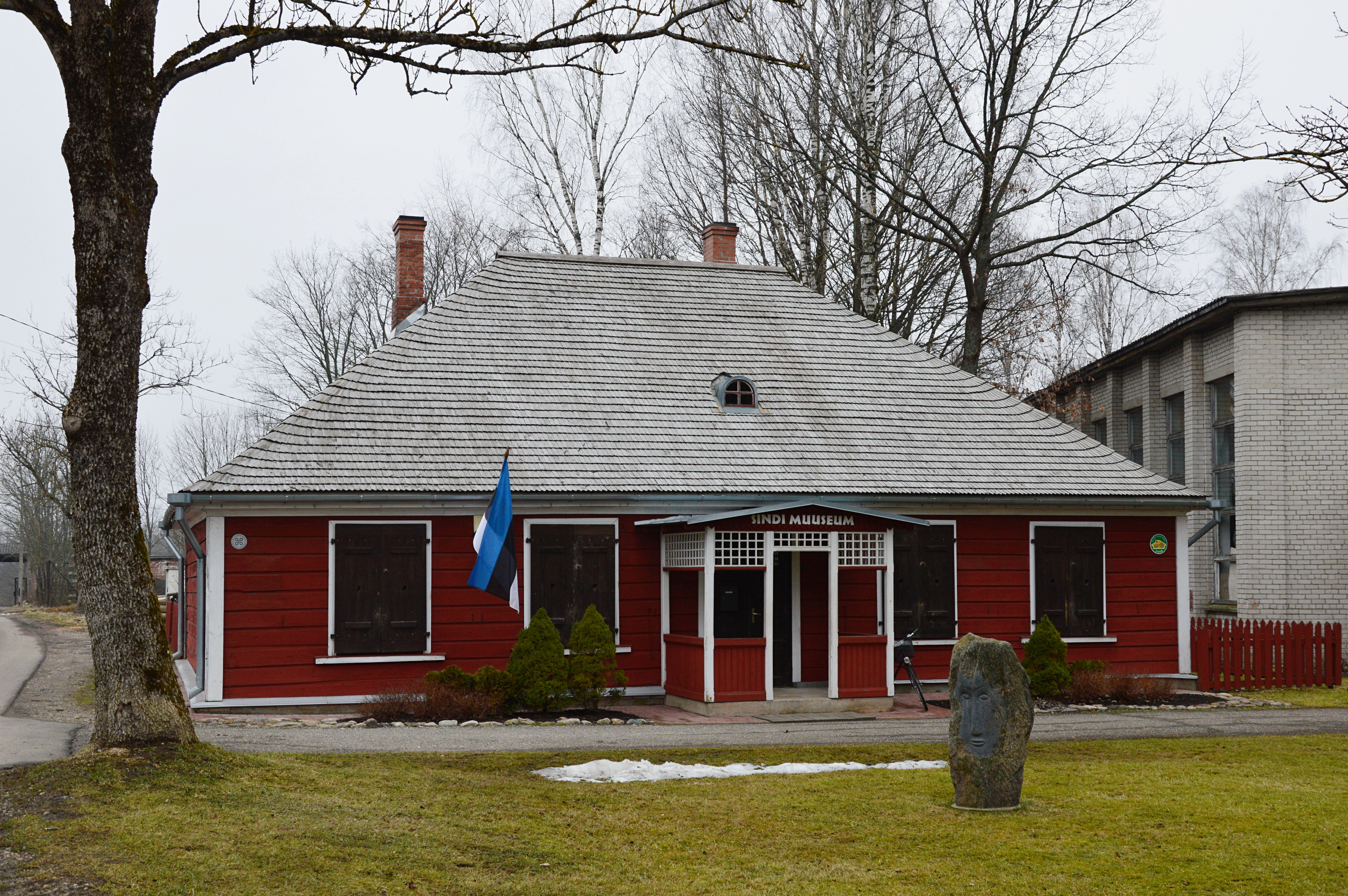
Sindi museum

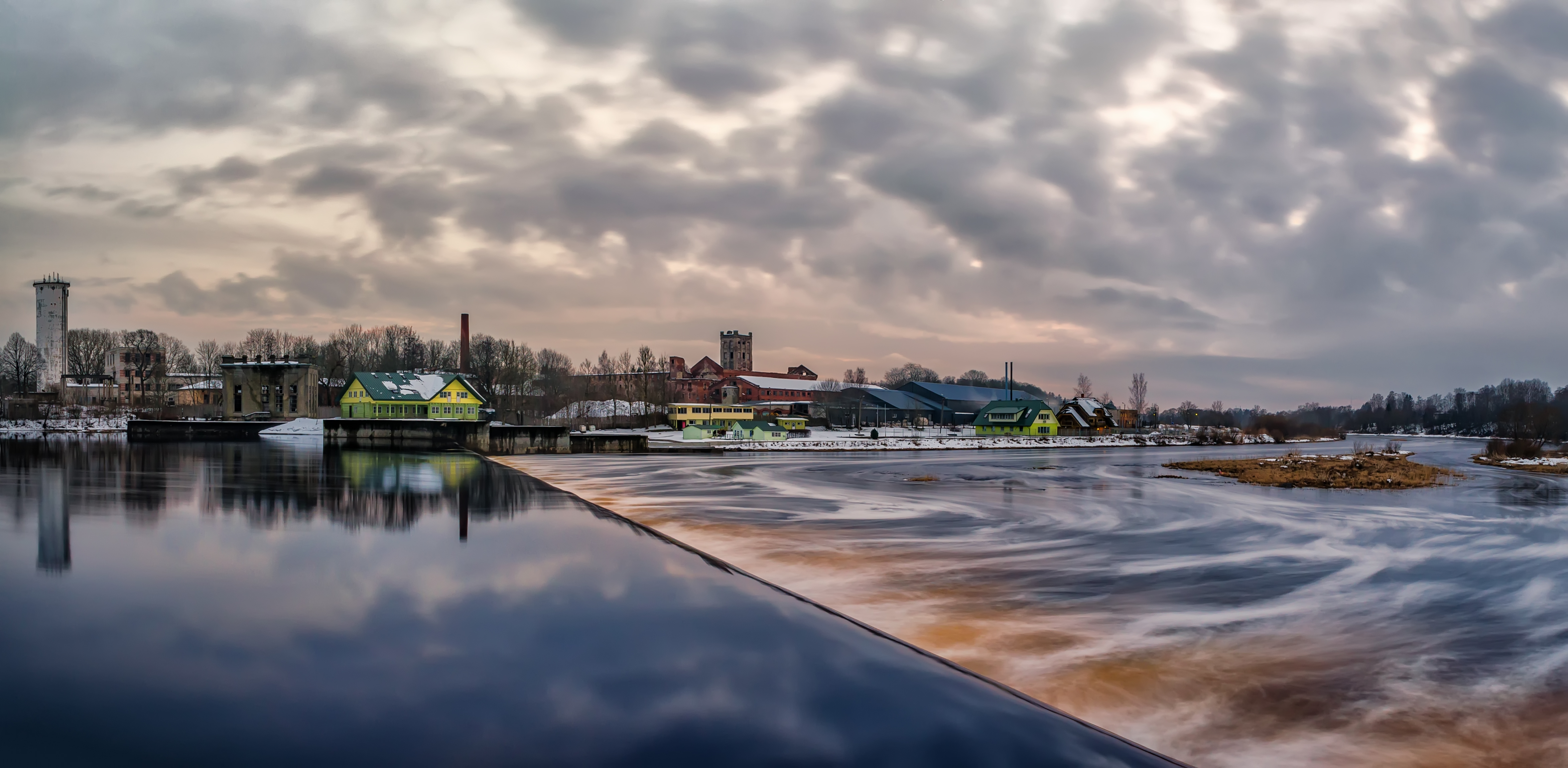
Former Sindi dam
