= Kristina Vähi =

Estonian opera singer

Kristina Vähi (since 2008 Vähi-Matesen) was born on 25 March 1973 in Tartu. She is an Estonian opera singer (soprano).

In 1996, she graduated from Georg Ots Tallinn Music School. In 2003, she graduated from Estonian Academy of Music and Theatre.

From 2006 to 2014, she was an operatic soloist at Estonia Theatre., and between 1997 and 2007, she was a member of operatic group Operetta Scretta.

Since 2005, Vähi works as a vocalist in the accompaniment class of the Tallinn Music High School and since 2018, also as a singing teacher and vocal coach.

Awards:

- 1996: 1st prize in Klaudia Taev Competition

== Roles ==
- Ernestine (Offenbach "Pitzelbergide salong", 1996, Estonian Music Academy)
- Danubia (Suppé "Kümme neidu ja ei ühtegi meest", 1998, Estonian Music Academy)
- Nicole and Etienne (Herman "Linnupuur", 1999, Smithbridge Productions)
