= Ilya Silchukov =

Ilya Silchukou
- Ілля Сільчукоў
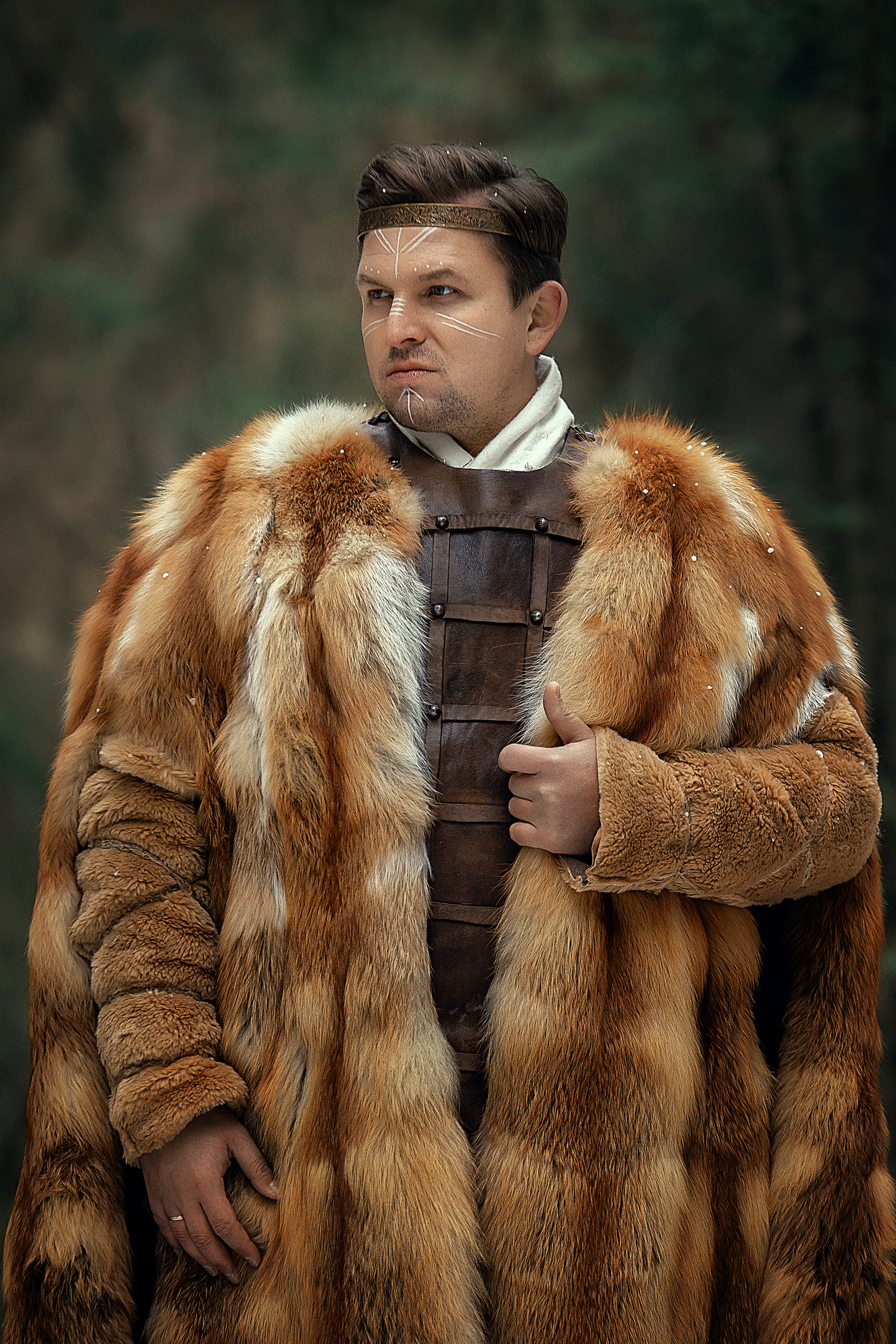
- Baryton-Noble
- Born: 1982 (age 42–43); Minsk, Byelorussian Soviet Socialist Republic
- Occupation: Opera singer (baritone)
- Years active: 2005–present
- Awards: Medal Of Francysk Skaryna; Silver Medal of Union of Theatre Workers of the Russian Federation; International Music Award BelBrand
- Website: www.ilyasilchukov.com

Christ Is Risen
Christ is Risen, a Romance by Sergei Rachmaninoff

Ilya Silchukou, could also be spelled Ilya Silchukov, (Belarusian: Ілля Сільчукоў; Russian: Илья Сильчуков; born 1982) is a Belarusian Baryton-noble Baritone. He debuted his career in Tchaikovsky's Eugene Onegin at the National Opera and Ballet of Belarus in 2005. Ever since his debut he has shared his appearance at several European opera houses. His academic and vocal achievements had shown his preparedness and the alertness of a true opera singer.

== Early life and education ==
Ilya Silchukov was born and grew up in Minsk, Belarus. In 1988, at the age of six he began studies of music and it became known that Ilya had an Absolute pitch. In 2000, he graduated with honors from the State Musical Lyceum of the Belarusian State Academy of Music. As his base education he studied choir conducting. Starting from 9th grade, Silchukov began attending voice performance classes of baritone Sergey Kostin. In 2002, he graduated from Minsk State Musical College n.a. M. Glinka classes of professor Adam Murzich majoring in Vocal Performance. In 2005, Ilya Silchukov earned a BFA and in 2007 MD in Voice Performance at the Belarusian State Academy of Music under the tutelage of docents/associate professors Petr Riedeger and Larisa Shymanovitch. In 2009, Silchukov participated in Tremplin Jeunes Chanteurs project of Opéra d'Avignon. In 2011, he was selected for Young Singers Program of the Salzburg Festival where he worked with Christa Ludwig, Piotr Beczała, Michael Schade, Simon Keenlyside, Marc Minkowski and Ivor Bolton.

== Early career ==
In 2005 Silchukov debuted his career in Eugene Onegin by Pyotr Ilyich Tchaikovsky entering the ensemble of the National Opera and Ballet of Belarus in Minsk. Silchukov's International debut was in 2009 at Parnu International Opera Festival as Athanael in J. Massenett's "Thais" with Veronika Dzhioeva (Russia), Staged by Mai Murdmaa and directed by Erki Pehk. The next years brought performances in many important opera houses including Teatro dell'Opera di Roma, Oper Frankfurt, Israeli Opera, Théâtre Royal de la Monnaie, Grand Theatre, Warsaw, Teatro Lirico Giuseppe Verdi, Opéra National de Montpellier, Estonian National Opera, Slovak National Theater, Janáček Theatre, Vorarlberger Landestheater, Opera i Filharmonia Podlaska, Moldova National Opera Ballet, National Theatre Brno, Perm Opera and Ballet Theatre, Bruckner Festival, and others.

== Professional career ==
In 2019 Ilya Silchukou performed a duet with Elena Salo at the Opening Ceremony of 2nd 2019 European Games hold in Minsk, Belarus: Among Anna Netrebko, Yusif Eyvazov, Igor Krutoy and Dimash Kudaibergen. In 2008, 2009 and 2010 Ilya Silchukou was awarded grand prizes of the Special Fund of the President of the Republic of Belarus for Support of the Talented Youth.

Silchukou's public opposition to Alexander Lukashenko's re-election as President of Belarus in August 2020 resulted in his being fired from the National Opera in Minsk. Subsequently, in May 2021, Silchukou left Belarus with his family and settled in Boston USA. He has renounced three Special Fund of the President of the Republic of Belarus awards that he received personally from Lukashenko in 2008, 2009 and 2010.

== Awards and achievements ==
- In 2015 Silchukov was given a, governed by the Law of the Republic of Belarus, State award – Medal Of Francysk Skaryna for contribution to the development of national culture and art.
- In 2015 Silchukov received the International Music Award BelBrand

== Roles and productions ==
Year	Opera/Work	Role/Part	Location
2020	Pagliacci	Silvio	Belarus State Opera Bolshoi, Minsk
2020	Faust	Valentine	Belarus State Opera Bolshoi, Minsk
2020	La Traviata	Giorgio Germont	Armenian State Symphony, Yerevan
2020	L'Elisir D'Amore	Belcore	Theatre Du Capitole, Toulouse
2019	Eugene Onegin	Onegin	Polish National Opera, Warsaw
2018	Iolanta	Robert	Opera De Rennes, Rennes
2018	Iolanta	Robert	Grand Theatre, Angers
2018	Iolanta	Robert	Theatre Graslin, Nantes
2018	La bohème	Marcello	Belarus State Opera Bolshoi, Minsk
2017	Iolanta	Robert	Brucknerfest, Linz
2017	La Traviata	Giorgio Germont	Parnu International Opera Music Festival, Parnu
2017	Faust	Valentine	Israeli Opera, Tel Aviv
2017	Stabat Mater (Dvořák)	Bass Solo	Opéra National de Montpellier
2017	Eugene Onegin	Onegin	Polish National Opera, Warsaw
2016	La Traviata	Giorgio Germont	Moldova National Opera Ballet, Chişinău
2016	Luisa Miller	Miller	Teatro Lirico Giuseppe Verdi di Trieste
2016	Il tabarro	Michele	Opéra National de Montpellier
2016	Royal Palace by Kurt Weill	the Beloved of Yesterday	Opéra National de Montpellier
2015	Werther	Albert	Teatro Lirico Giuseppe Verdi di Trieste
2015	The Miserly Knight	Duke	La Monnaie/De Munt, Bruxelles
2015	La Traviata	Giorgio Germont	Opera i Filharmonia Podlaska, Bialystok
2014	La Traviata	Giorgio Germont	Estonian National Opera, Tallinn
2014	The Queen of Spades	Prince Yeletzky	Belarus State Opera Bolshoi, Minsk
2013	La Traviata	Giorgio Germont	Vorarlberger Landestheater, Bregenz
2013	La Traviata	Giorgio Germont	Narodni Divadlo, Brno
2012	Khovanshchina	Boyar Fyodor Shaklovitiy	Oper Frankfurt
2012	The Barber of Seville	Fiorello	Teatro dell'Opera di Roma
2012	Kashchey the Deathless	Prince Ivan Korolevich	Belarus State Opera Bolshoi, Minsk
2012	Pagliacci	Silvio	Belarus State Opera Bolshoi, Minsk
2011	Iolanta	Robert	State Opera, Perm
2011	Faust	Valentine	Slovak National Opera, Bratislava
2011	The Snow Maiden	Misgir	Belarus State Opera Bolshoi, Minsk
2009	Thaïs	Athanael	Parnu International Opera Music Festival, Parnu
2008	Carmen	Morales	Belarus State Opera Bolshoi, Minsk
2007	The Magic Flute	Speaker of the Temple	Belarus State Opera Bolshoi, Minsk
2006	Iolanta	Robert	Belarus State Opera Bolshoi, Minsk
2005	Eugene Onegin	Onegin	Belarus State Opera Bolshoi, Minsk

== Competitions ==
In 2001 Ilya Silchukov won his first vocal contest by getting 1st Prize of 2nd National S. Maniuszko Vocal Competition in Cherven, Belarus. Following his success Ilya went on to compete at numerous vocal competitions around the world. Among most honored competitions attended are: Belvedere Competition, Klaudia Taev Competition, Muslim Magomaev Competition...

Prize	Location	Year	ref.
3rd Prize	International Opera Competition of Portofino. Portofino, Italy	2017	
2nd Prize & STD Silver Medal	1st L.P Alexandrovskaya International Vocal Competition. Minsk, Belarus	2004	
1st Prize	I M. Magomaev International Vocal Competition. Moscow, Russia.	2010	
1st Prize	21st M. Schneider-Trnavsky International Vocal Competition. Trnava, Slovak Republic.	2010	
Semi Final Diploma	13th Neue Stimmen International Vocal Competition. Gutersloh, Germany.	2011	
Helikon Opera Special Prize	30th International Hans Gabor Belvedere Gesangswettbewerb. Vienna, Austria.	2011	
3rd Prize	6th International Vocal Competition "VOKAL GENIAL". Munchen, Germany	2011	
3rd Prize	Malmo Vocal Competition. Malmo, Sweden	2006	
1st Prize & Prof. Kucharsky Gold Medal	22nd I. Godin International Vocal Competition. Vrable, Slovakia.	2010	
1st Prize	15th International Vocal Competition "BELLA VOCE". Moscow, Russia	2007	
5th Prize	3rd N. Obukhova International Vocal Competition. Lipetsk, Russia.	2008	
Finalist Diploma	3rd International Singing Competition at the 71st Strasbourg Music Festival. Strasbourg, France	2008	
Gold Medal	2nd World Delphic Games. Saratov, Russia	2008	
Silver Medal	4th Youth International Delphic Games. Astana, Kazakhstan	2007	
3rd Prize	4th B. Shtokolov International Vocal Competition. Saint Petersburg, Russia	2014	
Diploma	25th L. Sobinov Contest of Voice Competitions Winners. Saratov, Russia	2012	
Diploma	1st P. Lisitsian International Baritone Competition. Moscow, Russia	2008	
2nd Prize	18th I. Godin International Vocal Competition "IUVENTUS CANTI". Vrable, Slovakia.	2006	
Special Prize	4th International Vocal Competition "VOKAL GENIAL". München, Germany	2007	
3rd Prize & Ave Maria Prize	5th Klaudia Taev Competition. Parnu, Estonia	2007	
Special Prize	Competizione Dell'Opera. Minsk, Belarus	2012	
3rd Prize	2nd L.P. Alexandrovskaya International Vocal Competition. Minsk, Belarus	2012	
Special Prize	1st International Christmas Vocal Competition. Minsk, Belarus	2014	
Finalist	European Broadcasting Union's New Talent Contest, Bratislava, Slovakia	2009	

== Discography ==
- RACHMANINOV, S.: Troika- Aleko / The Miserly Knight / Francesca da Rimini (rec. La Monnaie, 06/2015; Label: Bel Air Classiques; Catalogue No: BAC133; Barcode: 3760115301337; Physical Release: 08/2016)

== Photos ==
Photos
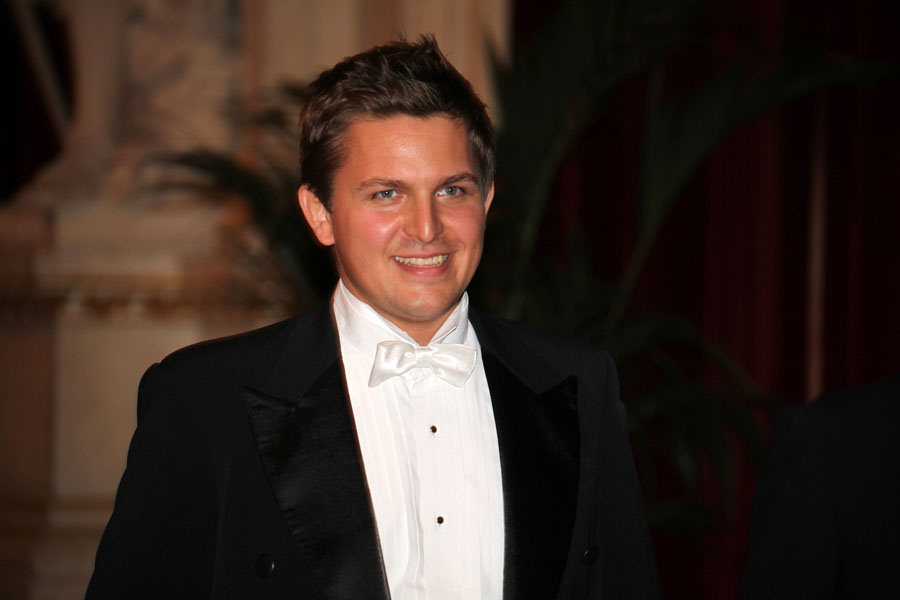
Belvedere Competition Vienna in Austria.

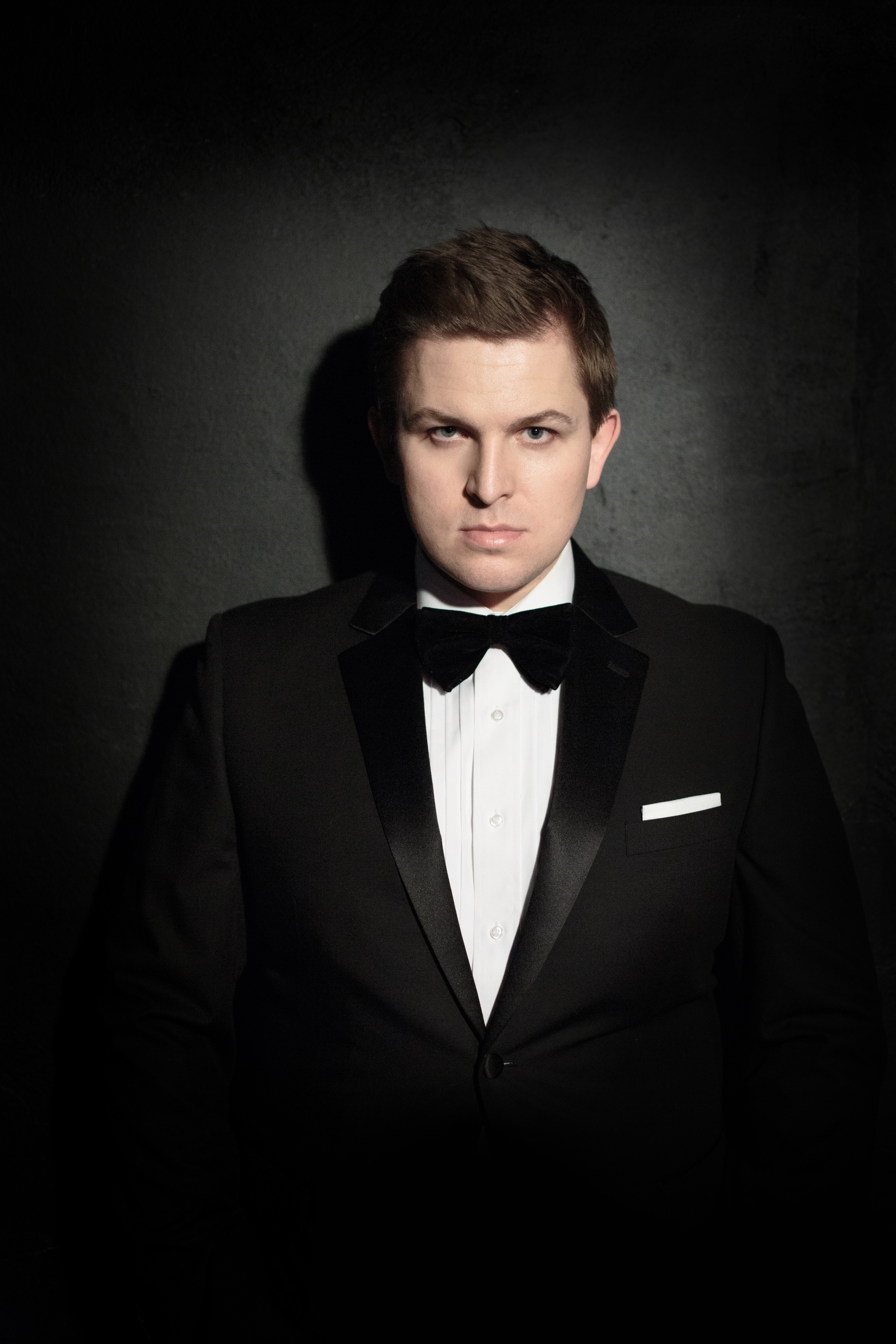
Silchukov in a role of Eugene Onegin, 2012

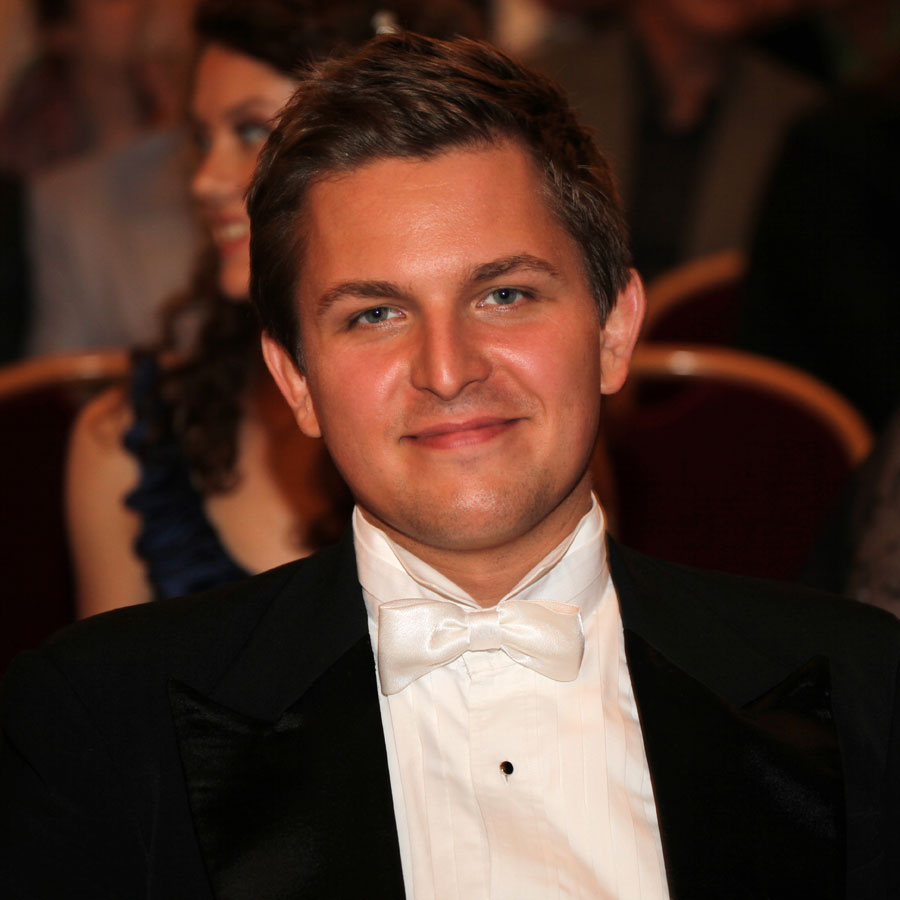
Silchukov is in attendance of Belvedere Competition, 2014

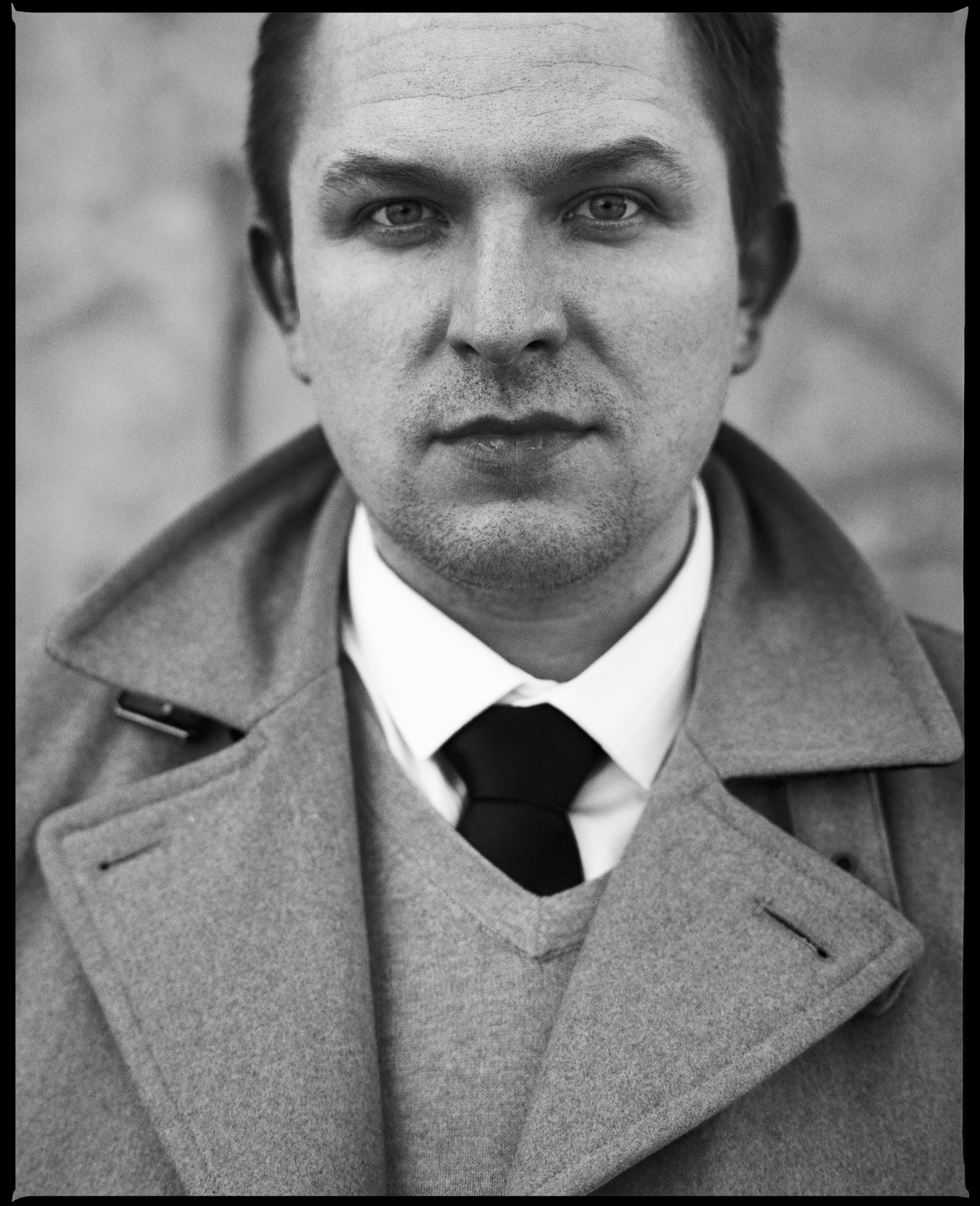
Ilya Silchukov Lyric Baritone

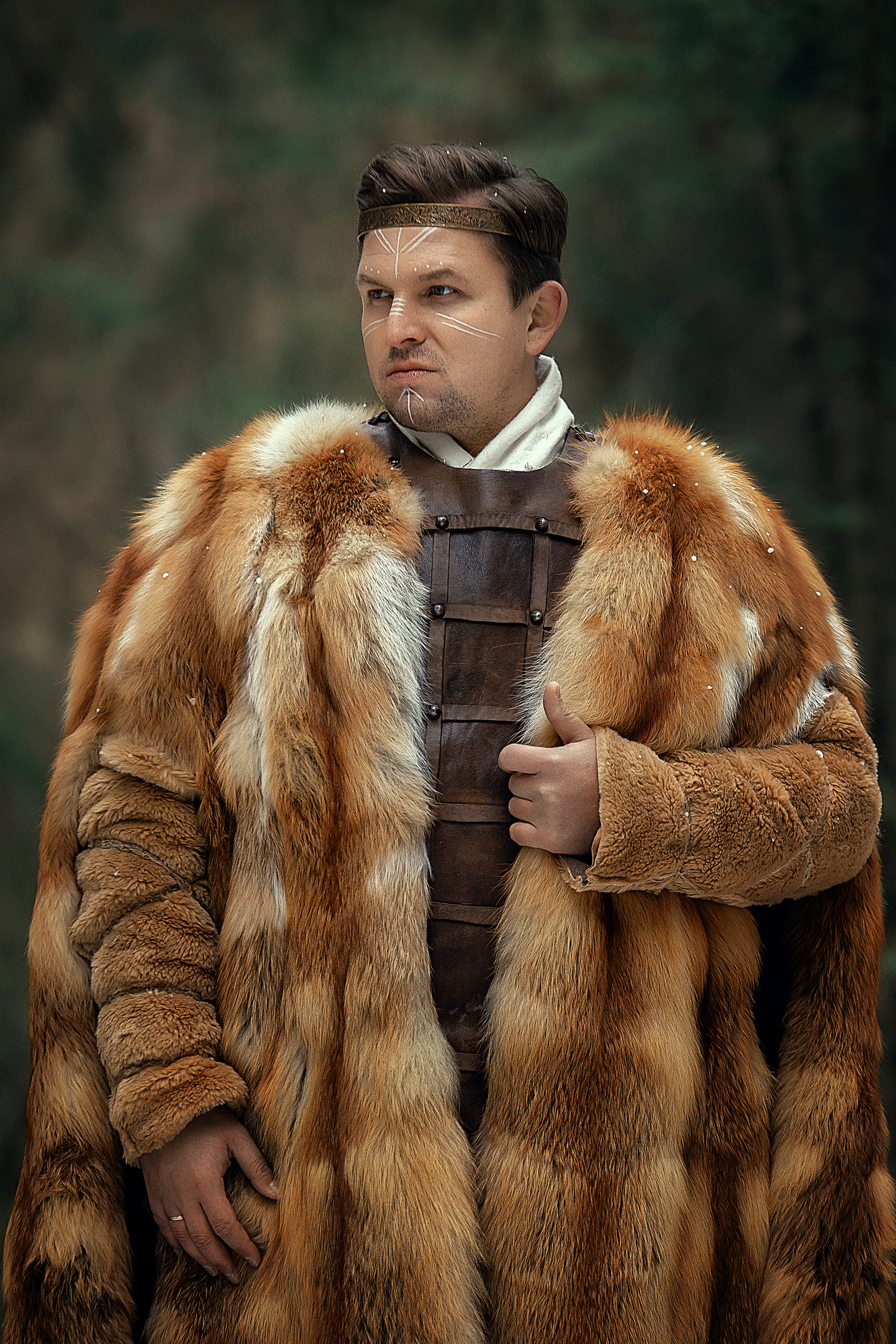
Ilya Silchukov in an artistic role
gallery
