= Klaudia Taev Competition =

Opera competition

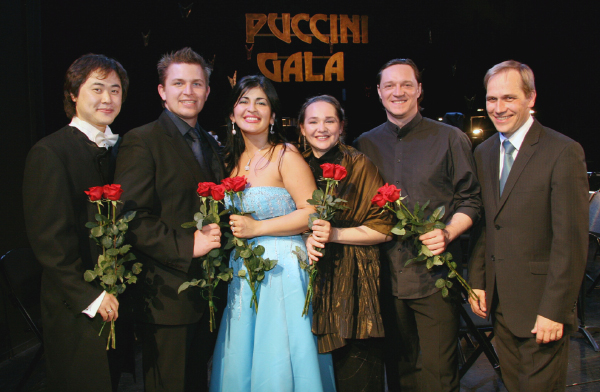

The Klaudia Taev Competition is a competition for young opera singers. It is the main event of the Pärnu Opera Music Festival PromFest. The Competition has been named after a local legendary singing teacher Klaudia Taev. The first Competition was held in the year 1996 and since 2001 it takes place biannually.

The main prize of the competition is the proposal to sing the main opera role in opera production, which is selected at the request of the winner of the competition.

Among others Barbara Hendricks, Edda Moser, Dolora Zajick, Yevgeny Nesterenko, Teresa Żylis-Gara, Ileana Cotrubas, Vesselina Kasarova, Maria Guleghina, Karan Armstrong, Luana DeVol, Cynthia Makris, Sergei Leiferkus and Irina Arkhipova have been the jury members of the Klaudia Taev Competition.

== Prize winners ==
No.	Year	1st Prize	2nd Prize	3rd Prize	Other finalists
1.	1996	Kristina Vähi (soprano, Estonia)	Taina Hirvonen (soprano, Finland)	Monika Sutt (soprano, Estonia)	
2.	2001	Anna Samuil (soprano, Russia)	not awarded	Gediminas Tiškevičius (tenor, Lithuania); Klavdia Sorokina (soprano, Russia); Merle Silmato (mezzo-soprano, Estonia)	András Muskát (tenor, Hungary); Yulia Semenova (soprano, Estonia)
3.	2003	Laimonas Pautienius (baritone, Lithuania)	Tatjana Romanova (soprano, Estonia); Elena Semyonova (soprano, Russia)	Eleonore Marguerre (soprano, Germany)	Nurlan Bekmukhambetov (tenor, Kazakhstan); Igor Bogaert (baritone, The Netherlands)
4.	2005	not awarded	Huiling Zhu (mezzo-soprano, China); Anzhelina Shvachka (mezzo-soprano, Ukraine)	Ewa Biegas (soprano, Poland)	Julia Markova (mezzo-soprano, Russia); Angelika Mikk (soprano, Estonia); Olga Senderskaya (soprano, Russia)
5.	2007	Ji-Min Park (tenor, South-Korea)	Veronika Dzhioeva (soprano, Russia)	Ilya Silchukov (baritone, Belarus); Oliver Kuusik (tenor, Estonia)	Oksana Volkova (mezzo-soprano, Belarus); Nikolay Shamov (baritone, Russia)
6.	2009	not awarded	Anatoli Sivko (bass, Belarus)	Asmik Grigorian (soprano, Lithuania); Pauliina Linnosaari (soprano, Finland); Maria Veretenina (soprano, Estonia)	Tadas Girininkas (bass, Lithuania); Alfiya Karimova (soprano, Russia)
7.	2011	not awarded	Andrey Savchenko (baritone, Belarus)	Elina Shimkus [Volkmane] (soprano, Latvia)	Tatiana Ganina (soprano, Ukraine); Pirjo Jonas [Püvi] (soprano, Estonia); Nicola Proksch (soprano, Austria); Iurii Samoilov (baritone, Ukraine)
8.	2013	Jomantė Šležaitė (soprano, Lithuania)	Anna Denisova (soprano, Russia)	Leo Radoslavljevic (baritone, USA)	Jin Hee Lee (soprano, South Korea); Olga Heikkilä (soprano, Finland); Ksenia Kuchukova (soprano, Estonia)
9.	2015	Alex (Sunghyun) Kim (tenor, South Korea)	Ewa Tracz (soprano, Poland)	Yury Rostotsky (tenor, Russia); Rihards Millers (baritone, Latvia)	Elena Brazhnyk (soprano, Ukraine); Margrethe Fredheim (soprano, Norway)
10.	2017	Abigail Levis (mezzo-soprano, USA)	Taras Berezhansky (bass, Ukraine)	Eszter Zemlényi (soprano, Hungary)	Margarita Levchuk (soprano, Belarus); Modestas Sedlevičius (baritone, Lithuania); Laura Teivāne (soprano, Latvia)
11.	2019	not awarded	Sargis Bazhbeuk-Melikyan (bass, Armenia); Hanna Tverdova (soprano, Ukraine)	Kamilė Balabonaitė (soprano, Lithuania); Samuli Taskinen (bass-baritone, Finland)	Marija Arutiunova (soprano, Lithuania); Vladislav Tlushch (baritone, Ukraine)
12.	2021	Zuzanna Nalewajek (mezzo-soprano, Poland)	Gyungmin Gwon (baritone, South-Korea)	Kadi Jürgens (mezzo-soprano, Estonia); Serhii Moskalchuk (bass-baritone, Ukraine)	Kamila Dutkowska (soprano, Poland); Yuliia Zasimova (soprano, Ukraine)
13.	2023	Gabrielė Bukinė (soprano, Lithuania)	Marie-Andrée Bouchard-Lesieur (mezzo-soprano, France)	Gagik Vardanyan (baritone, Armenia)	Adrian Janus (baritone, Poland); Junoh Lee (bass-baritone, South Korea); Tomi Punkeri (baritone, Finland)
14.	2025	Vlada Koieva (soprano, Ukraine)	Arpi Sinanyan (soprano, Armenia)	Emma Kajander (soprano, Finland)	Oleksandra Diachenko (mezzo-soprano, Ukraine); Duangamorn Fu (soprano, Thailand); Jongwoo Hong (tenor, South Korea)

== Opera productions ==
No.	Year	Production	The role offers for the laureates/finalists	The role offers for laureates/finalists of previous years
1.	2003	Rigoletto (Verdi)	Anna Samuil (Gilda)	
2.	2005	The Demon (Rubinstein)	Laimonas Pautienius (Demon)	Merle Silmato (Tamara's Nurse)
3.	2007	Carmen (Bizet)	Anzhelina Shvachka (Carmen); Huiling Zhu (Carmen)	Tatiana Romanova (Micaëla); Laimonas Pautienius (Escamillo)
4.	2009	Thaïs (Massenet)	Veronika Dzhioeva (Thaïs); Ilya Silchukov (Athanaël); Oliver Kuusik (Nicias)	
5.	2011	Attila (Verdi)	Anatoli Sivko (Attila)	
6.	2013	The Tsar's Bride (Rimsky-Korsakov)	Andrey Savchenko (Gryaznoy); Elina Shimkus (Marfa)	Anzhelina Shvachka (Lyubasha)
7.	2015	Aida (Verdi)	Jomantė Šležaitė (Aida)	Anzhelina Shvachka (Amneris)
8.	2017	La traviata (Verdi)	Alex (Sunghyun) Kim (Alfredo)	Anna Denisova (Violetta); Ilya Silchukov (Germont)
9.	2019	The Capulets and the Montagues (Bellini)	Abigail Levis (Romeo); Margarita Levchuk (Giulietta)	Yury Rostotsky (Tebaldo)
10.	2021	Il turco in Italia (Rossini)	Sargis Bazhbeuk-Melikyan (Selim); Hanna Tverdova (Fiorilla); Kamilė Bontė (Zaida); Vladislav Tlushch (Prosdocimo)	Taras Berezhansky (Don Geronio); Yury Rostotsky (Don Narciso)
11.	2023	Cendrillon (Massenet)	Zuzanna Nalewajek (Cendrillon)	Abi Levis (Le Prince Charmant); Jomantė Šležaitė (Madame de la Haltière); Eszter Zemlényi (La Fée); Laimonas Pautienius (Pandolfe)
12.	2025	Adriana Lecouvreur (Cilea)	Gabrielė Bukinė (Adriana); Adrian Janus (Michonnet)	Laimonas Pautienius (Michonnet)
