= Marko Šorin =

Estonian politician

Marko Šorin (born 9 June 1974 in Sindi) is an Estonian politician. He is a member of the XIV Riigikogu.

From 2011 until 2016, he was Mayor of Sindi and former deputy mayor of Pärnu.

Since 2011, he has been a member of Estonian Centre Party.
