= Jomantė Šležaitė =

Lithuanian operatic soprano singer (born 1989)

Jomante Slezaite Jomantė Šležaitė
- Born: February 7, 1989 (age 36); Tauragė, Lithuania
- Genres: Opera
- Occupation: Opera singer (soprano)

Jomante Slezaite (Lithuanian: Jomantė Šležaitė born 1989) is a Lithuanian operatic soprano singer.

Jomantė graduated from the Lithuanian Academy of Music and Theatre and Kaunas Vytautas Magnus University Music Academy (class of Prof. Vladimiras Prudnikovas). She has participated in master classes taught by Ingrid Kremling (Hamburg), Wojciech Starostecki (Prague) and Verena Rein (Berlin).

She won the Klaudia Taev Competition in 2013 and received prizes at the Tiit Kuusik International Lied Competition (2012), Kaunas International Solo Song Contest (2012), and the Lonigo International Song Contest (2010).
