= Maria Veretenina =

Estonian opera singer

Maria Veretenina is an Estonian dramatic coloratura soprano opera singer.

== Early life ==
She was born in Tallinn. Veretenina graduated in 2010 from the Estonian Academy of Music and Theatre.

== Career ==
In 2011 she made her opera debut at Finnish National Opera. She performed with bass Matti Salminen. In 2019, Maria gave a sold-out solo concert at the Mariinsky Theatre's new stage in the main Concert Hall in St Petersburg. At age 19, Maria began a series of thousands of solo concerts throughout the world including the Grand Hall of the St. Petersburg Philharmonia, the Chamber Opera in Vienna, the Royal College of Music and St. John's Smith Square in London, Zaragoza Concert Hall and in Estonia, the opera and Estonia concert halls in Tallinn. She appears on Estonian radio and television, and sang for his Majesty King Charles III (then HRH The Prince of Wales) and the Royal Family (2016, London). Maria performed for the Archbishop of Canterbury and Pope Francis in London, in 2017.

== Awards ==
- 2006: 1st prize at Hendrik Krumm Young Singers Contest in Kuressaare (Estonia)
- 2006: 1st prize at International Isabella Yurieva Competition of Russian Romance Singers in Tallinn
- 2009: 3rd prize at Klaudia Taev Competition in Pärnu
- 2018: 1st prize at festival-competition European Romance in Hamburg

== Opera roles ==
Handel

- Cleopatra Giulio Cesare
- Semele Semele
- Merab Saul
- Rinaldo, Almirena Rinaldo
- Alcina Alcina

Mozart

- Queen of the Night Die Zauberfloete
- Konstanze Die Entfuhrung aus dem Serail
- Fiordiligi Cosi fan tutte
- Donna Anna Don Giovanni
- Zerlina Don Giovanni

Donizetti

- Lucia Lucia di Lammermoor
- Linda Linda di Chamounix
- Norina Don Pasquale

Bellini

- Norma Norma
- Amina La Sonnambula

Rossini

- Rosina IL Barbiere di Siviglia
- Semiramide Semiramide

Offenbach

- Olympia Les Contes d’Hoffmann
- Antonia Les Contes d’Hoffmann

Puccini

- Liu Turandot
- Lauretta Gianni Schicchi
- Musetta La Boheme

Verdi

- Violetta La Traviata
- Guilda Rigoletto
- Aida, Voice of the High Priestess Aida

Rimsky-Korsakov

- Marfa Tsars Bride
- Tsaritsa of Shemakha The Golden Cockerel

Mussorgsky

- Xenia, Marina Boris Godunov

Tchaikovsky

- Tatjana Eugene Onegin

Bach

- Magnificat
- St. Matthew Passion
- Requiem, Missa in c, Vespers, Exsultate Jubilate
