= Veronika Dzhioeva =

South Ossetian operatic soprano singer

- Джиоты Вероникæ
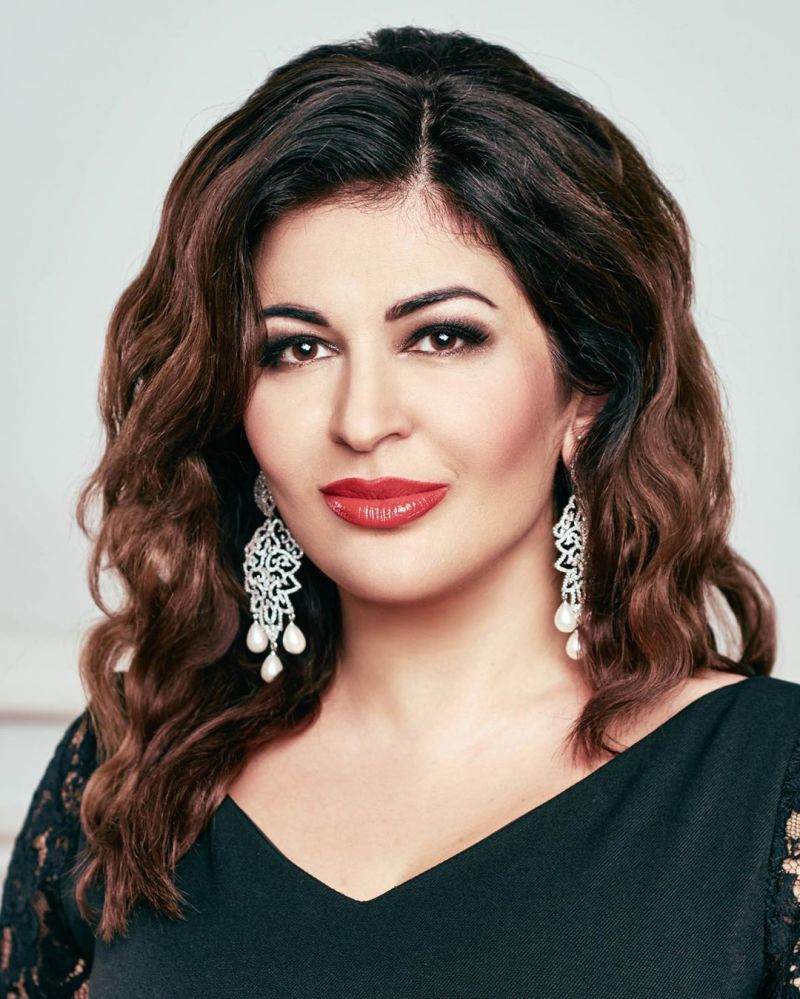
- Born: January 29, 1979 (age 46); Tskhinvali, South Ossetia, Georgian Soviet Socialist Republic, Soviet Union
- Occupation: Opera singer (soprano)
- Years active: 1992–present

Veronika Dzhioeva (Ossetian: Джиоты Романы чызг Вероникæ; born 29 January 1979) is a South Ossetian soprano.

== Early life ==
Dzhioeva was born in Tskhinvali, South Ossetia. Since she was 13 years old she performed in solo concerts as a dancer, but her real dream at that time was to become a singer. She finished her training in Vladikavkaz College in 2000 and then 5 years later graduated from the Saint Petersburg Conservatory where her teacher was Tamara Novichenko. Following that she attended numerous master classes with Elena Obraztsova, Joan Sutherland, and Luciano Pavarotti. As of 2006 she works in Novosibirsk Opera and Ballet Theatre and since 2010 is a guest soloist with Bolshoi Theatre.

== Career ==
In 2006 Veronika sang a part from Mozart's Così fan tutte while being in a role of Fiordiligi at Moscow's International House of Music and then sang Great Mass in C minor at the Moscow Conservatory. During the same year she appeared as Princess Urusova in Shchedrin's Boyarynya Morozova and then in 2007 appeared as Zemfira in Rachmaninoff's Aleko along with Russian National Orchestra and its conductor Mikhail Pletnev. The same year she performed both Giuseppe Verdi's Requiem and Gustav Mahler's Symphony No. 2 at the same place. In 2008 she sang as Mimì in La bohème at the Moscow Conservatory and then returned to Requiem performance which was staged in Saint Petersburg. In 2007 and 2009 respectively she performed Tishchenko’s Flight of Time at the Saint Petersburg Philharmonia and then played as the title role in Thaïs in Estonia and as Micaëla in Carmen in Seoul, South Korea.

In 2010 Dzhioeva joined Novosibirsk Philharmonia with which she sang Four Last Songs under Alim Shakhmametev's conducting. Later on she joined Mariinsky Theatre with which she traveled the world. She is also a frequent performer at the International Contemporary Art Festival.

From January to February 2013 Veronika played a role of Donna Elvira in Don Giovanni which was performed on stage at the Wortham Theater Center and Houston Grand Opera. She then moved with the play to Vermont where she played the same role in November of the same year and a year later performed as Elizabeth in a third production of Don Carlos.

== Films ==
She is also known for her appearance in many Russian TV films such as The Winter Solo of the Wave, Vasilyevsky Island, and Monte Cristo.

== Awards ==
In 1998 in Astrakhan Veronika Dzhioeva was awarded first prize at the World Vision International Competition and five years later won another price in the same city at the Mikhail Glinka International Competition. In 2005 she won third prize at the All-Russian Competition of Opera Singers in Saint Petersburg and then won another one in Athens at the Maria Callas Grand Prix the same year. A year later she became first-prize recipient again, this time at the Amber Nightingale Competition in Kaliningrad and then became 2nd prize winner at the Klaudia Taev Competition in Pärnu, Estonia. In 2009 she won Paradise prize for her performance as Lady Macbeth in a play of the same name. In 2010 Veronika won EURO Pragensis Ars prize from Czech Republic and next year received Grand Prix award which from Channel One Russia Grand Opera competition. Besides those awards she is also a proud holder of the Golden Mask and Golden Sofit awards.

In 2015 she and Marat Gatsalov were nominated for Golden Mask award again. In 2017 she received a Russian National Music Award nomination for "Best Vocalist in Classical Music".

== Repertoire ==
- La boheme — Mimi
- Don Giovanni — Donna Elvira
- Ruslan and Lyudmila — Gorislava
- Turandot — Liu
- Don Carlos — Elisabeth
- La boheme — Musetta
- Cosi fan tutte — Fiordiligi
- The Marriage of Figaro — La Contessa
- Boyarynya Morozova — Princess Urusova
- Aleko — Zemfira
- Eugene Onegin — Tatiana
- La traviata — Violetta
- Carmen — Micaela
- Don Carlos — Elisabeth
- Macbeth — Lady Macbeth
- Thaïs — Thaïs
- Un ballo in maschera — Amelia

== Works ==
- Opera Arias
