= Joachim Haspinger =

Capuchin priest and Tyrolean Rebellion leader

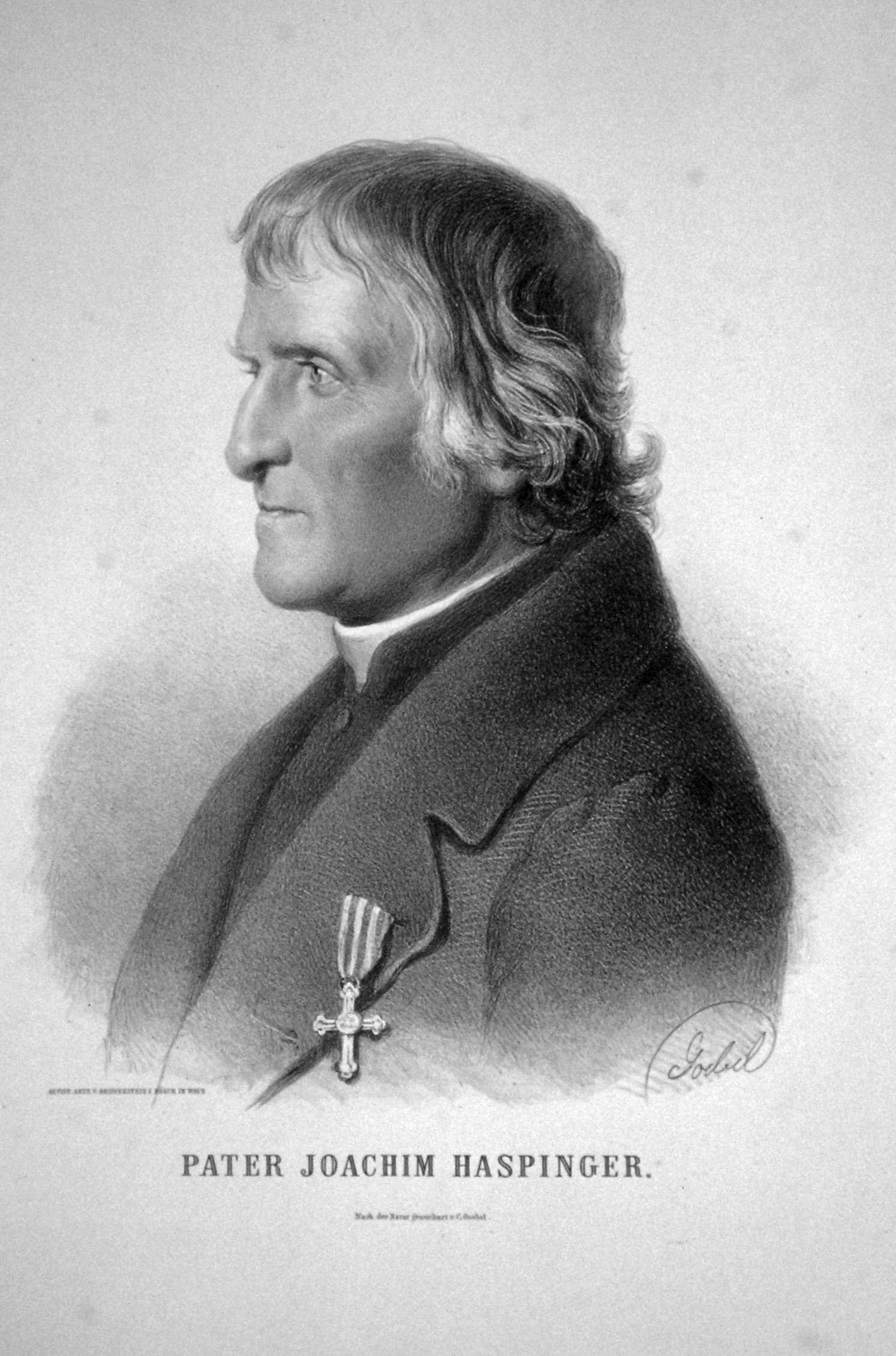
Joachim Haspinger

Johann Simon Haspinger (28 October 1776 – 12 January 1858) was a Capuchin priest and a leader of the Tyrolean Rebellion against the French and Bavarian occupation forces during the Napoleonic War of the Fifth Coalition.
