= Hans Miilberg =

Estonian opera singer (1945–2020)

Hans Miilberg (25 May 1945 Sindi – 2 December 2020 Tallinn) was an Estonian opera singer (baritone). He was the son of Johannes Miilberg and Maria Miilberg and brother of Martin Miilberg, Velly Kuusik, Linda Kuusik. His father was a carpenter, mother was employed as a weaver.

In 1978 he graduated from the Tallinn State Conservatory. From 1972 to 1977 he sang with Estonian Radio's mixed choir, and from 1977 to 2006 at the Estonia Theatre performed as a chamber and pop singer, including in Canada, England, France, Sweden, etc.

== Opera roles ==
- Almaviva (Mozart's "Figaro pulm", 1976)
- Don Giovanni (Mozart's "Don Giovanni", 1977)
- Chaunard (Puccini's "Boheem", 1977)
