= Heino Pehk =

Estonian choir conductor and music teacher

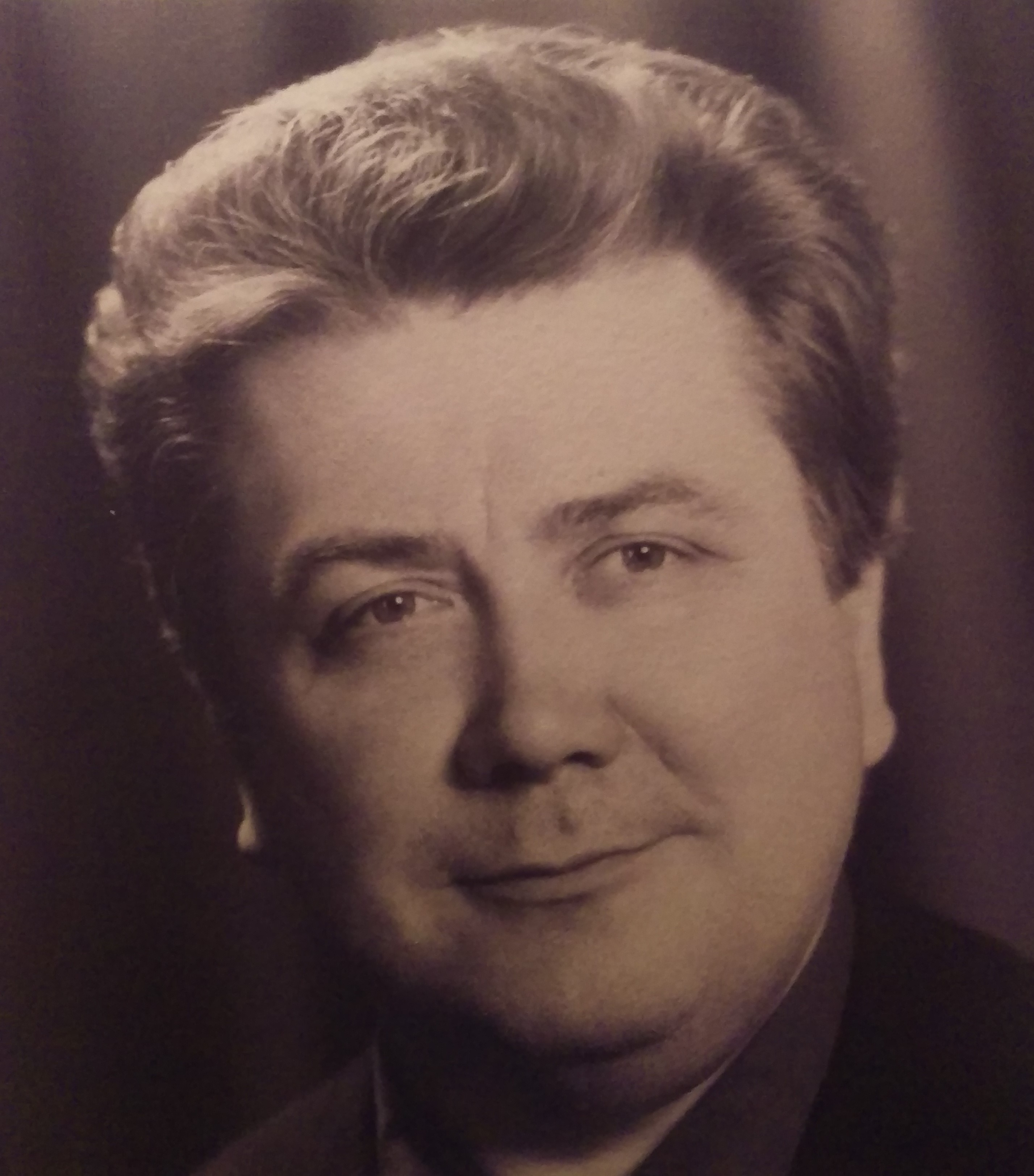
- Heino Pehk (1975)
- Born: December 25, 1940; Maaritsa, then part of Estonian SSR, Soviet Union
- Died: 14 January 2025 (aged 84)
- Occupations: choir conductor and music teacher
- Years active: 1965–2022
- Children: Heiki Pehk (son), Erki Pehk (son), Marika Alavere (daughter)
- Relatives: Sander Pehk (grandson)
- Awards: Medal of The Order of the White Star (2004)

Heino Pehk (25 December 1940 - 14 January 2025) was an Estonian choir conductor and music teacher.

== Biography ==
From 1955 to 1959, Pehk studied accordion in Tartu Music School. From 1960 to 1965, he studied choir conducting at Tallinn State Conservatory with Arvo Ratassepp.

He taught accordion for more than 50 years, from 1959 to 2010, at Võru Music School, and from 1960 to 1964 at Tallinn Music School.

He has been the chief conductor of Võru Male Choir since 1965, and has worked as a conductor with many other vocal ensembles and choirs. These include:

- 1964-1966 – Sõsara (Sisters), a female vocal group
- 1965-2000 – Cantus, a mixed choir of Võru County music teachers
- 1973 – Võru Boys Choir
- 1980-2000 – Võru Male Ensemble
- 1994-2022 – Ensemble of Soldiers' Union of Võru

== Awards ==
- 1975 – Honorary Artist of the Estonian Soviet Socialist Republic
- 2009 - Order of Võru County's coat of arms (the highest recognition for citizens of the county)
- 2014 – Medal of the Order of the White Star
