= Cynthia Makris =

American soprano opera singer (born 1956)

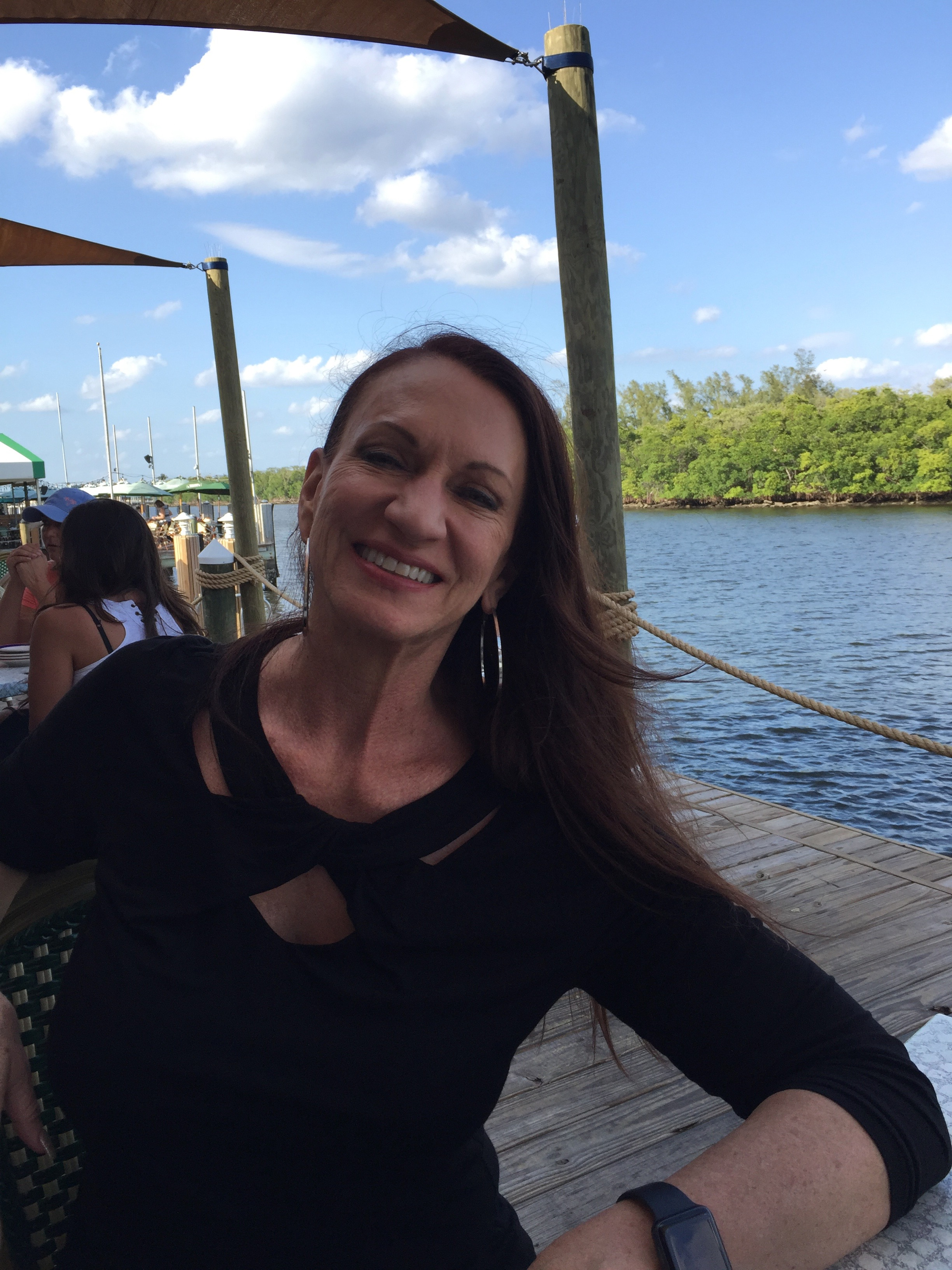
On the water in Florida

Cynthia Makris (born 1956) is an American soprano opera singer as well as a voice and empowerment coach.

== Early life and education ==
Makris was born in Sterling, Colorado, USA, and has a Bachelor of Arts degree in History and Music Performance from Adams State College. Cynthia also has a degree in Interior Design from Palm Beach State College.

== Opera Singer and Voice Coach ==
Cynthia Makris brings 30 years of experience singing major operatic roles in the leading opera houses of the world to her voice coaching. Her vast repertoire ranges from bel canto to dramatic, from Bellini, Donizetti, and Mozart to Verdi, Richard Strauss, and Wagner. Her career brought her to the stages of the world, including La Scala, Covent Garden, and the Teatro Colon in Buenos Aires. She has lived and worked in nearly every country in Europe, as well as Japan, Singapore, Australia, Brazil, Chile, Mexico, and Argentina. Makris has been praised not only for the beauty of her voice but also for the integrity, honesty, and depth of her portrayals of figures as diverse as Puccini’s fragile title heroine, Madama Butterfly, to Verdi’s Lady Macbeth or Strauss’ Salome, which she has performed over three hundred times on five continents.

Cynthia is multilingual and has sung in many languages. This, along with her knowledge of musical styles, makes her an ideal coach for the serious classical student. She also specializes in preparing young people for auditions and building the foundation for their vocal technique. Her students have been accepted into the prestigious Bak Middle School for the Arts and the Dreyfoos High School for the Arts, as well as receiving college scholarships to pursue degrees in vocal music.

Cynthia has been coaching singers since 2007. She has a B.A. in Music Performance and is a certified life coach and master practitioner of NLP. She is a very demanding teacher and expects her students to have a high demand of themselves. Understanding that the voice is a very intimate part of a person’s makeup, she is also very compassionate and positive and always on the side of the student, empowering at all times. Ms. Makris teaches a natural and healthy approach to developing the voice, using the body’s own resonance chambers. It is especially important for children, whose voices are still developing, to learn a natural style of singing which will support the still maturing voice and not put unnecessary strain on the vocal chords. Classical Italian techniques uncover the natural beauty of each voice. The goal is an instrument which is integrated in all registers, which is capable of a wide variety of expression and has both power and beauty throughout.

== Career ==
Makris has sung major soprano roles at La Scala and the Royal Opera House, the Finnish National Opera and many other opera houses. She has performed in Europe, South America, and Asia. Her repertoire ranges from coloratura to dramatic roles including the title role in Salome by Richard Strauss. For Opera Queensland she sang Abigaille in Verdi's Nabucco in 2007 and Turandot in 2008.

Her first professional role was as Tosca with the Denver Lyric Opera Company.

== Awards ==
Makris won the Metropolitan Opera Regional award for young singers as well the San Francisco Opera Regional award two consecutive years during her graduate studies in vocal performance at the University of Colorado at Boulder.

She received an award in 1982 from the German state of North Rhine-Westphalia for her performance of the three heroines in The Tales of Hoffmann.

She was Artist of the Year of the Savonlinna Opera Festival in 2006, an award for her contribution to the festival since 1993, when she sang Lady Macbeth in Ralf Långbacka's televised production of Verdi's opera.

== Personal life ==
Cynthia is married to Finnish tenor, Raimo Sirkiä and has a son, Pete Makris, who lives in Colorado. She lives in Florida, USA, and in Helsinki, Finland.

== Repertoire ==
Composer	Opera	Role	Opera Company / Partial List
Beethoven	Fidelio	Leonore	Finnish National Opera
Bellini	Norma	Norma	Finnish National Opera Opera of Philadelphia Badisches Staatstheater
Berg	Lulu	Lulu	Staatsoper Hannover
Berg	Wozzeck	Marie	Teatro Municipal de Santiago Badisches Staatstheater
Brand	Maschinist Hopkins	Nell	Theater Bielefeld ORF Concert & Recording, Wien
Donizetti	Anna Bolena	Anna	Finnish National Opera Badisches Staatstheater
Donizetti	Lucia di Lammermoor	Lucia	Theater Bielefeld Opernhaus Dortmund
Giordano	Andrea Chénier	Maddalena	Aalto Theater Essen
Korngold	Die tote Stadt	Marie/Marietta	Deutsche Oper am Rhein Teatro Colón Buenos Aires Royal Swedish Opera Teatro Bellini Catania Opera Antwerpen
Krenek	Jonny spielt auf	Anita	Teatro Colón Buenos Aires
Leoncavallo	La Bohème	Mimi	Theater Bielefeld
Moore	The Ballad of Baby Doe	Baby Doe	Theater Bielefeld
Mozart	Don Giovanni	Donna Anna	Theater Bielefeld Opernhaus Dortmund
		Donna Elvira	University of Colorado
Mozart	Die Entführung aus dem Serail	Constanze	Theater Freiburg Saarländisches Staatstheater
Mozart	Le Nozze di Figaro	La Contessa	Niederlandse Reisopera
Mozart	Die Zauberflöte	Pamina	Theater Freiburg
Offenbach	Les contes d’Hoffman	Olympia Antonia Giulietta	Theater Bielefeld Niederlandse Reisopera Opernhaus Dortmund
Puccini	La fanciulla del West	Minnie	Finnish National Opera Teatro Regio Torino Grange Park Opera
Puccini	Madama Butterfly	Cio-Cio San	Opéra de Rouen Utah Opera
Puccini	Manon Lescaut	Manon	Theater Bielefeld Staatsoper Berlin
Puccini	Tosca	Tosca	Denver Lyric Opera Badisches Staatstheater Finnish National Opera Opéra-Comique Paris Deutsche Oper Berlin
Puccini	Turandot	Turandot	Savonlinna Opera Festival Teatro Argentino de la Plata Teatro Colón Buenos Aires Auditorio National Mexico City Esplanade Singapore Queensland Opera Welsh National Opera
Schreker	Irrelohe	Eva	Theater Bielefeld
Smetana	The Bartered Bride	Marie	Theater Bielefeld
Spohr	Faust	Kunigunde	Theater Bielefeld
Johann Strauss	Die Fledermaus	Rosalinde	Opernhaus Dortmund Staatsoper Berlin
Johann Strauss	Der Zigeunerbaron	Saffi	Theater Freiburg
Richard Strauss	Arabella	Arabella	Opernhaus Dortmund New National Theatre Tokyo
Richard Strauss	Ariadne auf Naxos	Najade	Theater Freiburg
Richard Strauss	Die Frau ohne Schatten	Die Kaiserin	Theater Bielefeld Finnish National Opera
Richard Strauss	Der Friedenstag	Maria	Concert Version Germany
Richard Strauss	Elektra	Elektra	Tiroler Festspiele Erl Theater Freiburg
Richard Strauss	Salome	Salome	Opernhaus Dormund Australian Opera New National Theatre Tokyo Opera of Philadelphia Finnish National Opera Opéra national du Rhin Teatro municipal Rio de Janeiro Staatsoper Berlin Bayerische Staatsoper Teatro Nacional de São Carlos Royal Swedish Opera Scottish Opera
Verdi	Aida	Aida	Estonian National Opera
Verdi	Un ballo in maschera	Amelia	Opernhaus Dortmund Opéra de Rouen Semperoper Dresden
Verdi	Falstaff	Alice Ford	University of Colorado
Verdi	La forza del destino	Leonora	Badisches Staatstheater Savonlinna Opera Festival
Verdi	Luisa Miller	Luisa	Theater Bielefeld
Verdi	Macbeth	Lady Macbeth	Savonlinna Opera Festival Teatro Colón Buenos Aires Theater Bonn Teatro alla Scala Milano
Verdi	Nabucco	Abigaille	Estonian National Opera Royal Opera Covent Garden Queensland Opera
Verdi	Otello	Desdemona	Opernhaus Dortmund
Verdi	La traviata	Violetta	Oper Graz Theater Freiburg Deutsche Oper am Rhein Badisches Staatstheater Staatstheater am Gärtnerplatz Theater Bielefeld Opera Corpus Christi Staatsoper Berlin
Verdi	Il trovatore	Leonora	Opernhaus Dortmund Finnish National Opera Teatro Municipal de São Paulo Teatro Colón Buenos Aires Opera Leipzig Royal Danish Opera
Wagner	Der fliegende Holländer	Senta	Theater Bonn Tampere Opera Musikfestival Wels
Wagner	Die Meistersinger von Nürnberg	Eva	Opernhaus Dortmund
Wagner	Das Rheingold	Freia	Theater Freiburg
Wagner	Tannhäuser	Venus, Elisabeth Venus	Savonlinna Opera Festival Teatro Real Madrid
Weber	Der Freischütz	Agathe	Theater Bielefeld
Weill	Aufstieg und Fall der Stadt Mahagonny	Jenny	Theater Bielefeld Operahaus Dortmund
Zandonai	Francesca da Rimini	Francesca	Teatro Colón Buenos Aires
