= Oscar Saenger =

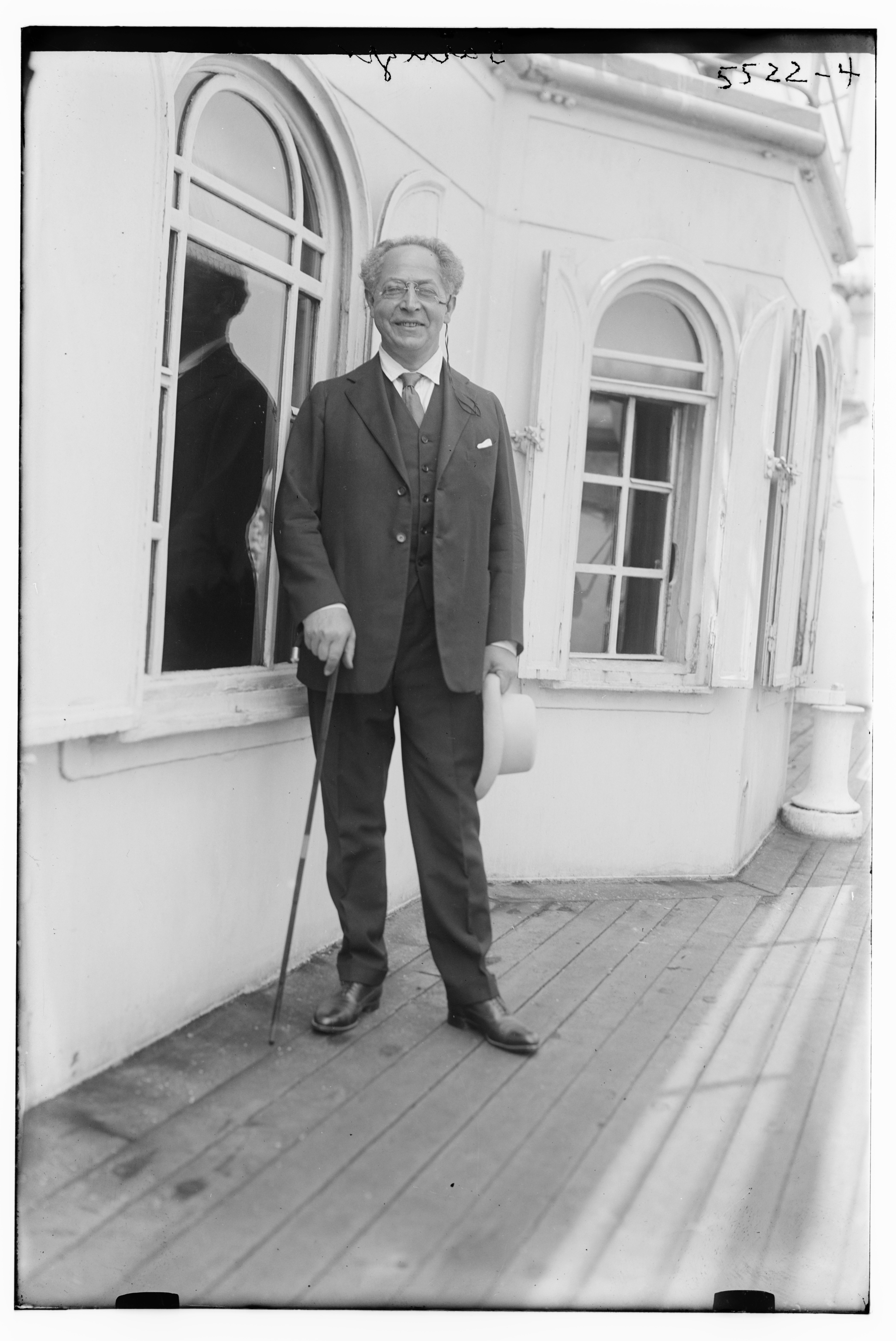
Oscar Saenger

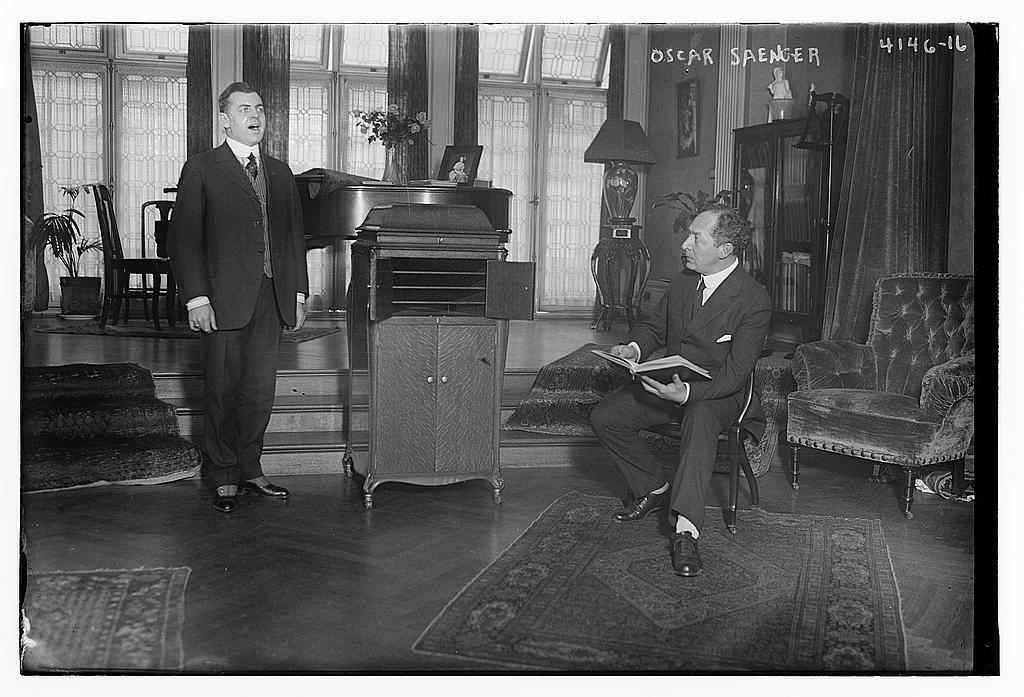
Saenger in 1917

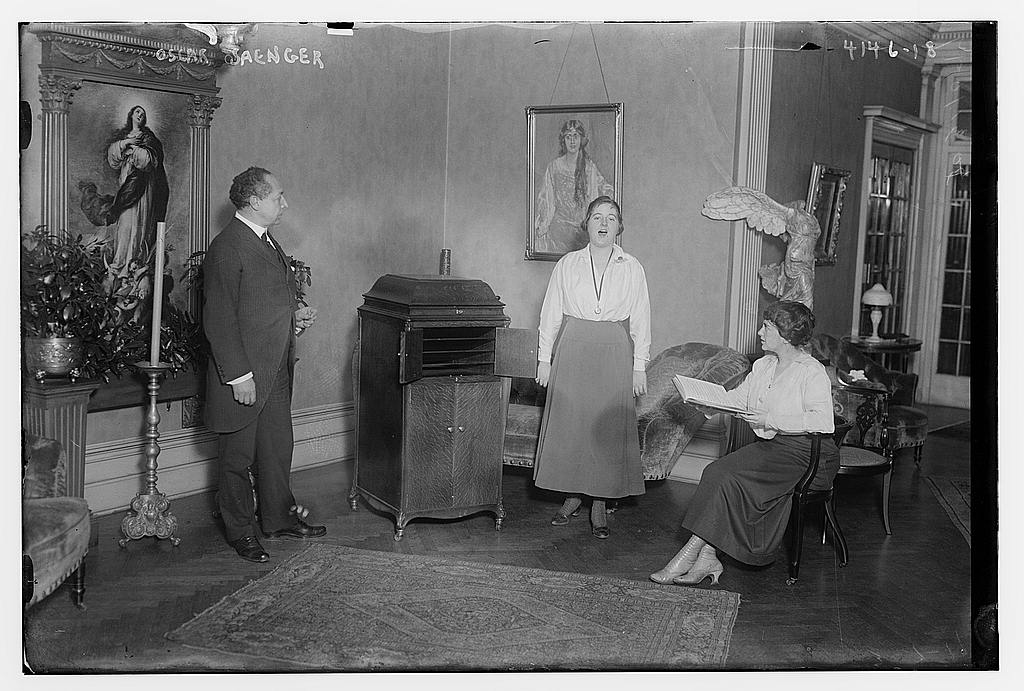
Saenger in 1917

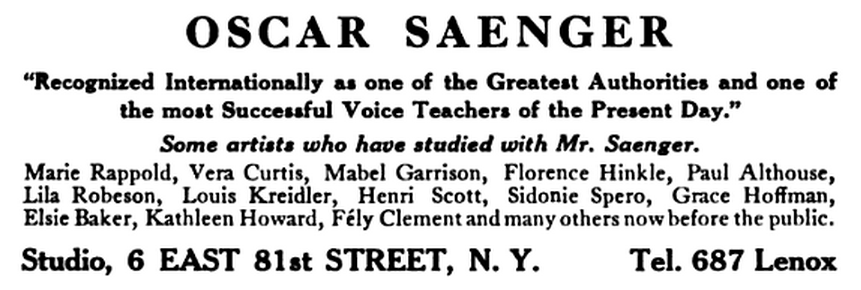
Saenger advertisement in the International Who's Who in Music and Musical Gazetteer (1918)

Oscar Saenger (January 5, 1868 – April 20, 1929) was a singing teacher. With the Victor Talking Machine Company he produced a complete course in vocal training in twenty lessons.

== Biography ==
He was born on January 5, 1868, in Brooklyn, New York City to German-American parents. When he was 18 years old, in 1886, he received a scholarship to the National Conservatory of Music of America. One of his teachers there was Leopold Winkler (piano). In 1891 he became the baritone soloist for the New American Opera Company in Philadelphia, Pennsylvania and in 1892 was a soloist for the Arion Society on their European tour.

He married Charlotte Wells on October 5, 1892, in Brooklyn. They had a daughter, actress and dancer Khyva St. Albans.

From 1925 to 1927 he served as president of the New York Singing Teachers Association.

He died on April 20, 1929, at the Washington Sanitarium in Washington, DC of cancer. He had been ill for a year and a half. Swami Paramahansa Yogananda performed the funeral rites.

== Pupils ==
He had the following pupils:

- Theodore C. Diers (1880–1942)
- Paul Althouse (1889–1954)
- Mabel Garrison (1886–1963)
- Kathleen Howard (1884–1956)
- Orville Harrold (1878–1933)
- Florence Hinkle (1885–1933)
- Bernice de Pasquali (1873–1925)
- Leon Rains (1870–1954)
- Marie Rappold (1874–1957)
- Lila Robeson, Louis Kreidler, Henri Scott, Sidonie Spero, Grace Hoffman, Elsie Raker, Evelyn Marston, Fely Clement, Joseph Regneas, Joseph S. Bernstein, Vera Curtis [Pauline Widenmann Kempf (1860–1953) of Ann Arbor, MI].
- Florence Cole Talbert (1890–1961)
