= Edward Ziegler (music journalist) =

American opera manager

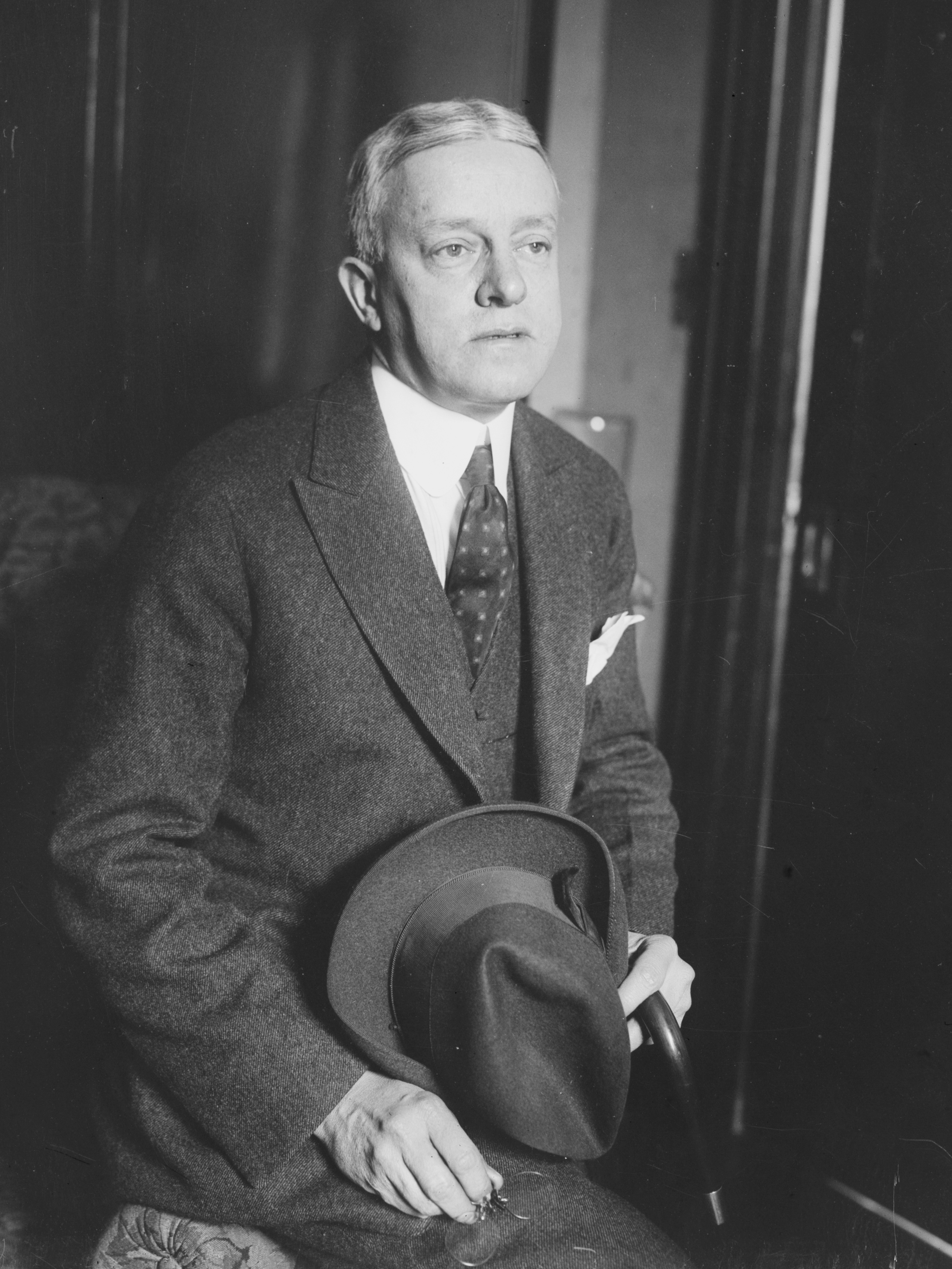
Edward Ziegler

Edward Emil Ziegler (March 25, 1870 – October 25, 1947) was an American music critic and opera manager.

A native of Baltimore, Ziegler began his career as assistant music critic at the New York Sun, working under James Gibbons Huneker. He served as a critic for various other New York City papers before becoming the administrative secretary of the Metropolitan Opera in 1916; in 1920 he was engaged as the assistant general manager to Giulio Gatti-Casazza. He remained with the company for the rest of his life, supervising most of its administrative and financial operations; he also scouted Europe in search of new talent to add to the roster. In addition, he organized the radio broadcasts of company productions from its stage.

When Herbert Witherspoon died at his post in 1935, Ziegler was considered for his replacement before being passed over in favor of Edward Johnson. In 1940 he helped lead the successful public drive to raise a million dollars for the company. He died in New York in 1947.
