= Rosina Galli =

Rosina Galli may refer to:

- Rosina Galli (dancer) (1892–1940), Italian-American ballet dancer
- Rosina Galli (actress) (1906–1969), Italian-American film actress
