= Edward Ziegler =

Edward or Edi Ziegler may refer to:

- Edward D. Ziegler (1844–1931), American local official and Democratic legislator
- Edward Ziegler (music journalist) (1870–1947), American writer and opera manager
- Edi Ziegler (born 1930), German road racing cyclist

== See also ==
- Edward Zigler (1930–2019), American psychologist and academic
- Ziegler (surname)
