= Rosa Olitzka =

German opera singer (1873–1949)

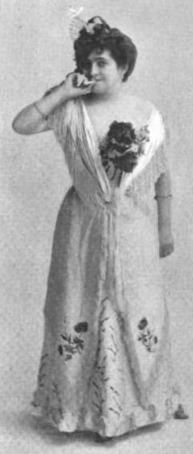
- Rosa Olitzka, from a 1903 publication.
- Born: September 6, 1873; Berlin
- Died: September 29, 1949 (aged 76); Chicago
- Other names: Rosa Olitzka Sinai, Rose Olitzka
- Occupation: opera singer
- Years active: 1890s–1920s

Rosa Olitzka (September 6, 1873 – September 29, 1949) was a German-born contralto singer. She sang with the Metropolitan Opera from 1895 to 1901, and with the Chicago Opera from 1910 to 1911.

== Early life ==
Rosa Olitzka was born in Berlin; her parents were Jewish immigrants from Poland. Her father, Joseph Olitzki, was a cantor. She studied voice with Julius Hey in Berlin, and with Désirée Artôt de Padilla in Paris. She also studied piano.

== Career ==
Olitzka made her opera debut in 1892, in Brno. She sang at the Court Theatre in Hanover, at the Municipal Theatre in Hamburg, and at the Court Opera in Dresden. At the Royal Opera House in London's Covent Garden, she appeared in Siegfried (1893), Orfeo ed Eurydice (1894), Otello (1895), Lohengrin (1895 and 1907), Faust (1895), Tannhäuser (1895), Die Walküre (1895, 1900, and 1907), Carmen (1897), Götterdämmerung (1900), Rigoletto (1901), and Aida (1905).

Olitzka sang at the 1896 funeral of William Steinway, in New York City. She first performed opera in the United States with the Damrosch Opera Company, and was a member of the Metropolitan Opera from 1895 to 1901. From 1902 to 1910, she was in Europe, singing in various German cities, as well as Brussels, Paris, and in Milan, at La Scala. She sang with the Chicago Opera from 1910 to 1911. Her Chicago manager was Vera Brady Shipman. In 1915 she toured Kansas, Arkansas, and Texas, giving concerts. She made dozens of recordings, mostly on the Columbia label, including several duets with soprano Bernice de Pasquali. "Mme. Olitzka has a marvelously sweet yet strong voice and produces wondrously beautiful tones in her work," commented one reviewer. "Dramatic in manner as she sings, her vocal efforts are most charming. Her voice is perfect in a compass of three full octaves from low C to high C."

She had a famous collection of jewelry, including a diamond pin given to her by Queen Victoria for her work, and a medal from Kaiser Wilhelm. She was the victim of several publicized episodes of theft or robbery later in life, in 1920, 1930, and 1937.

== Personal life ==
Rosa Olitzka married Boris J. Sinai, a Russian-born insurance agent, in 1908. She was widowed when he died in 1919. She died from a heart attack in 1949, aged 76 years, in her Chicago home.
