= Leopold Winkler =

German-born American pianist (1860–1924)

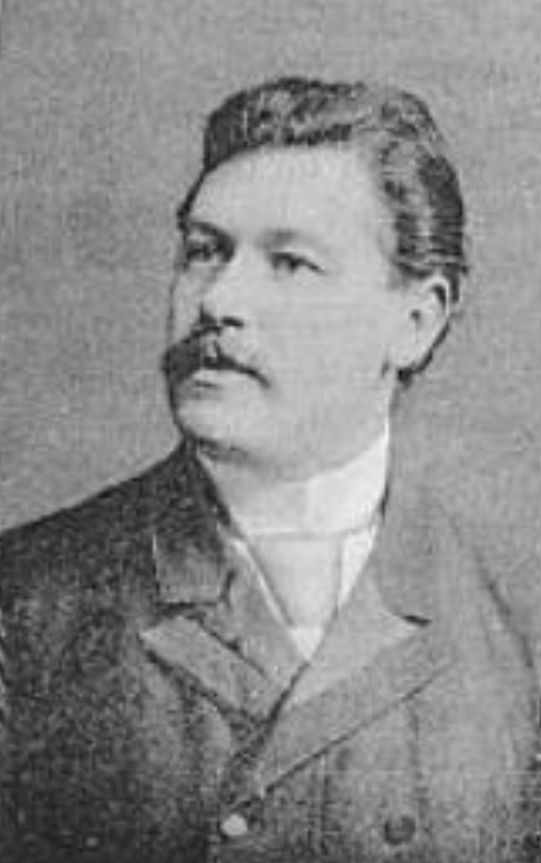
Leopold Winkler

Leopold Winkler (15 June 1860 – 21 December 1924) was a German-born American pianist, composer, and music educator.

== Life and career ==
The son of Solomon and Bertha Winkler, Leopold Winkler was born on 15 June 1860 in Gleiwitz, Kingdom of Prussia, in what is today Gliwice, Poland. He entered the Vienna Conservatory in 1870 at the age of ten, studying there for an eight year period. He won three gold medals at the conservatory, and graduated with high honors. He later studied piano privately with Anton Rubinstein. He was a member of the Tonkünstler-Societät.

Winkler immigrated to the United States in 1888 after having a successful career as a concert pianist in Europe. His first performances in America were performed that year under conductors Anton Seidl and Frank Van der Stucken He maintained a transcontinental concert career in the 1890s, performing in cities throughout Europe just prior to his first American tour in 1894. Subsequent U.S. tours followed in 1897 and 1898.

Winkler married in New York City in 1896, and had four children. He resided in Harlem at a home located at 111 W 124th St. In New York he taught on the faculty of the National Conservatory of Music of America (NCMA) for six years while Antonín Dvořák led the school. One of his students at the NCMA was Oscar Saenger. He left the NCMA to join the faculty of the Brooklyn Conservatory of Music. He became a naturalized American citizen on May 23, 1904.

As a composer he wrote solo works for the piano and art songs. He also worked as an arranger. He gave concerts at Carnegie Hall among other important venues in Manhattan. In 1912 he gave a recital at the Horace Mann School that was sponsored by Columbia University. In 1915/1916 he performed in a concert series of sonata recitals for cello and piano given at Hunter College.

Winkler died at the Harlem Hospital on 21 December 1924 following an attack of apoplexy while traveling on the New York City Subway. He was a member of the Arion Society of New York.
