= Florence Hinkle =

American operatic soprano

Florence Hinkle Witherspoon
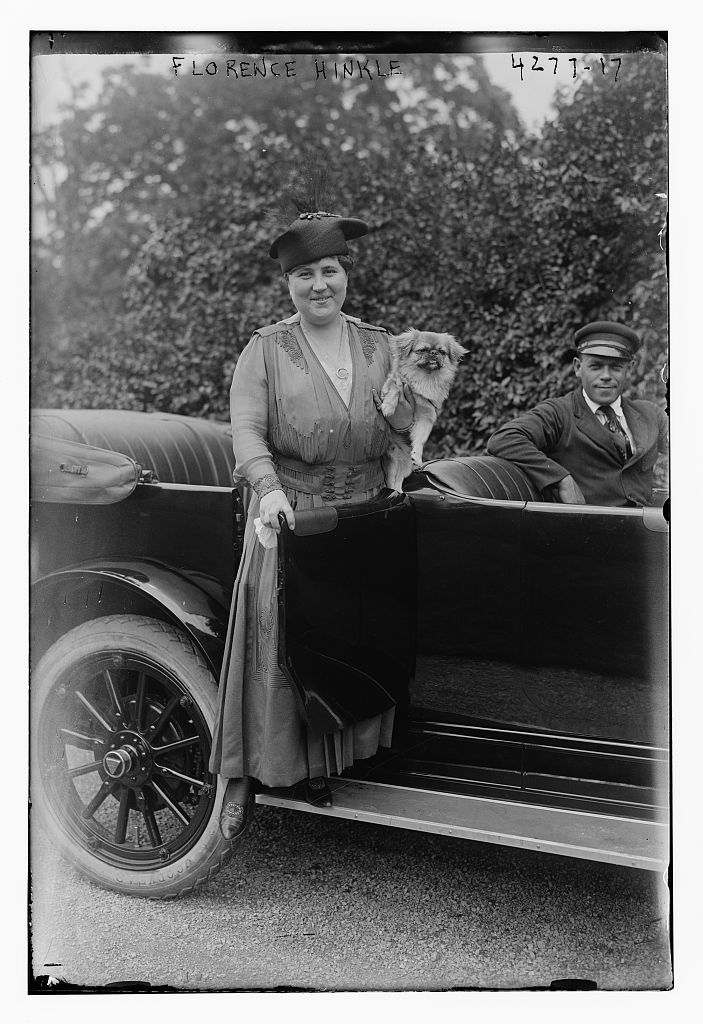
- Born: Florence Hinkle; June 22, 1885; Columbia, Pennsylvania
- Died: April 19, 1933 (aged 47); Cincinnati, Ohio
- Occupation: Opera singer (soprano)
- Spouse: Herbert Witherspoon

Florence Hinkle (June 22, 1885 - April 19, 1933) was an operatic soprano.

== Biography ==
Born on June 22, 1885, in Columbia, Pennsylvania, she toured with the Metropolitan Opera and, in 1915, performed in Richmond, Virginia. In 1919, she appeared at Aeolian Hall (Manhattan). She died on April 19, 1933, in Cincinnati, Ohio.

== Family ==
On June 20, 1916, in Manhattan she married Herbert Witherspoon, he had been previously married. Her widower died in 1935 after being named as the general manager of the Metropolitan Opera to replace Giulio Gatti-Casazza. His will set aside money for the Library of Congress to buy musical manuscripts in her name.
