= Khyva St. Albans =

American actress (1896–1989)

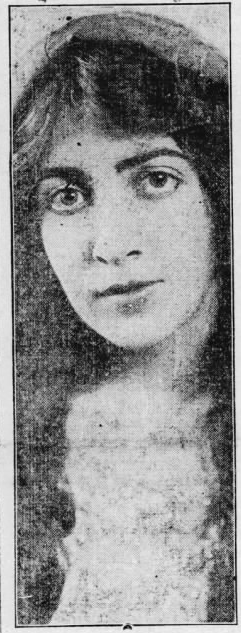
Khyva St. Albans, from a 1916 newspaper.

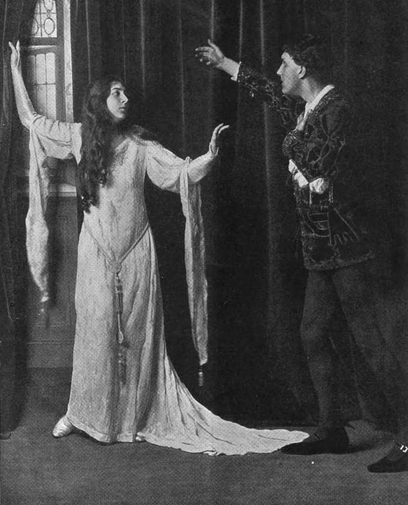
Khyva St. Albans and George Relph in the title roles of Romeo and Juliet, from a 1915 publication.

Khyva St. Albans (born Eleanor[e] Saenger; 1896–1989), also known as Zara Alexeyewa, Ayenara Alexeyeva, was an American actress, dancer, and choreographer. She was a longtime resident of Ajijic, on Lake Chapala in Mexico.

== Early life ==
Eleanore Saenger was born in New York City, although she claimed other birthplaces, including France. Her parents were musicians; her mother was organist Charlotte Welles Saenger, and her father was baritone singer and voice coach Oscar Saenger. Both parents supported and financed St. Albans' hopes of a theatrical career, until Oscar Saenger died in 1929.

== Stage career ==
St. Albans appeared in two shows on Broadway; she played Juliet opposite George Relph's Romeo in a 1915 production of Romeo and Juliet, and she played a dancer in Ruth Sawyer's The Awakening (1918), costarring with Theodore Kosloff. Neither show was well-reviewed; the New York Times called The Awakening "a weird and very artificial play" "almost unbelievably crude and old-fashioned." Metcalfe, a writer in Life, mused that "Someday, perhaps, we shall have a Society for the Prevention of Ladies Who Think They Can Act, but Can't, [and] a League for the Suppression of Persons Who Write Plays But Shouldn't. Had either of these organizations been in successful existence we should never have had 'The Awakening' with Khyva St. Albans." Of her Juliet, Heywood Broun in the New York Tribune wrote that "there was no passion in the performance of Miss St. Albans. She was a Juliet of the sort who would have suggested a long engagement, deferring marriage until such time as she had finished her schooling and Romeo had a steady job".

St. Albans translated a work by Leonid Andreyev as The Painted Laugh, which she starred in and produced for the London stage in 1921. Basil Rathbone was the male lead. The production became infamous when she and her mother suddenly disappeared after bad reviews for the first matinee, leaving the show's backers and cast unpaid. She was eventually found in a Paris hotel.

From 1926 to 1927, she was co-director of ballet at the Philadelphia Grand Opera Company, with her partner, dancer Holger Alexeyev-Mehner.

== Mexico ==
In the 1940s, after several extended visits, St. Albans had moved to Mexico permanently, with Alexeyev-Mehner (who died in 1944). She was known as "La Rusa" in Ajijic on Lake Chapala, where she made her home. An American visitor to Ajijic described her as "a ghostly figure in flowing silks and gossamer. She wore a wide-brimmed hat and held herself erect with a perfectly straight back. A long, thick rope-like braid of hair hung down to her waist." Late in life, she called attention to the problem of pollution in Lake Chapala. She died in Ajijic in 1989, aged 92 years.
