= Bernice de Pasquali =

American opera singer (1873–1925)

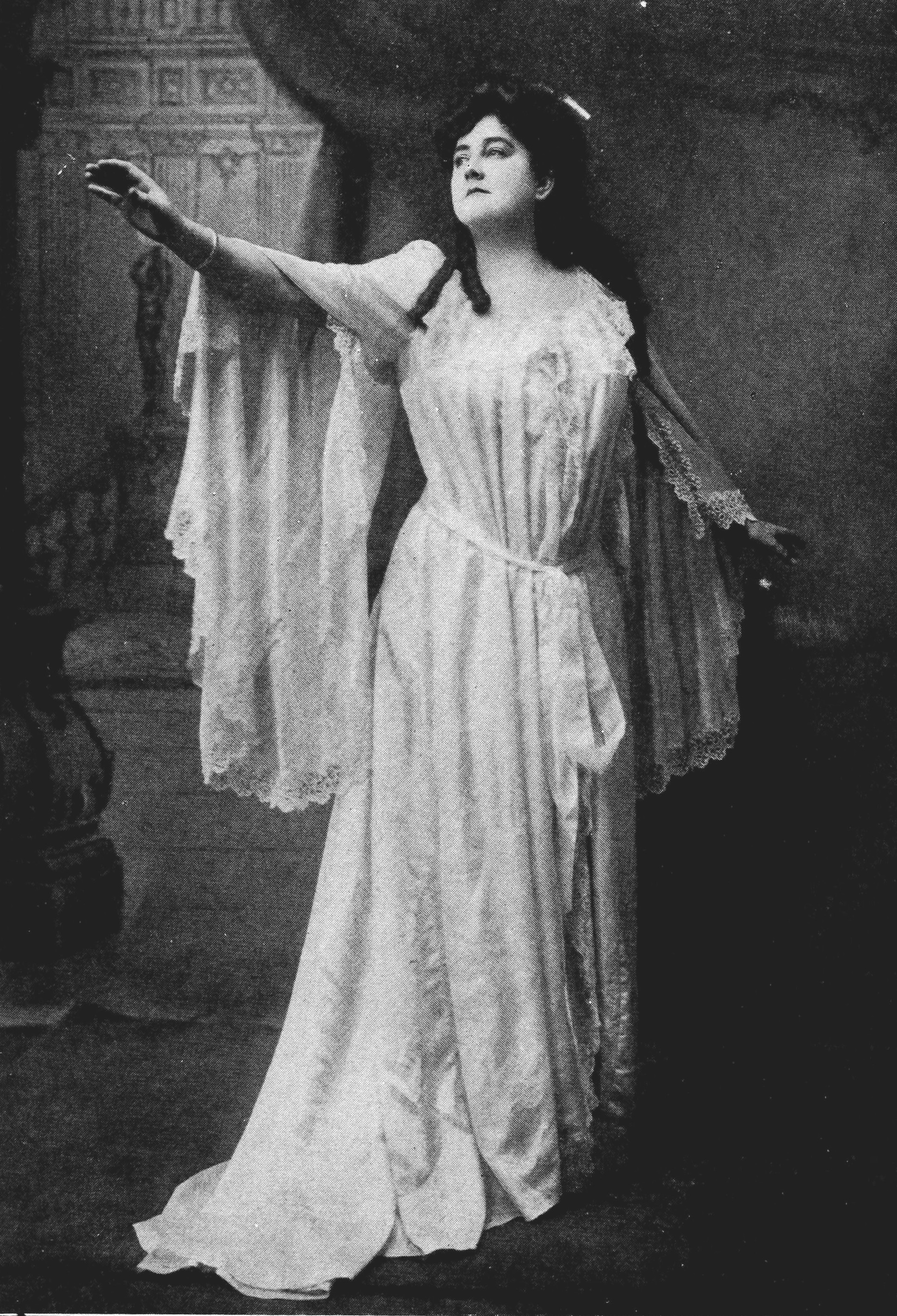
- Bernice de Pasquali as Gilda in Rigoletto (1912)
- Born: Bernice W. James; December 7, 1873; Hull, Massachusetts
- Died: April 3, 1925 (aged 51); Omaha, Nebraska
- Other names: Bernice de Pasquale, Berenice de Pasquali, Bernice Pasquali
- Occupation: coloratura soprano singer
- Years active: 1900–1925

Bernice de Pasquali (December 7, 1873 – April 3, 1925), born Bernice James, was an American coloratura soprano singer and pianist. She sang with the Metropolitan Opera from 1908 to 1917, and was the first American woman elected to membership in the Accademia Filarmonica Romana.

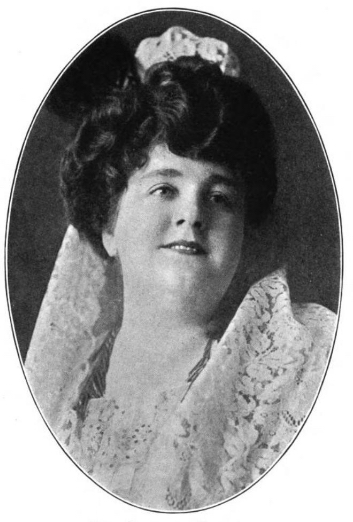
Bernice de Pasquali, from a 1921 publication.

== Early life ==
Bernice W. James was born in Hull, Massachusetts, the daughter of William W. James, a sea captain. Her uncle was Joshua James, a noted sea captain and commander of civilian life-saving crews. She played piano, and studied voice with Oscar Saenger in New York.

== Career ==
Bernice de Pasquali started on the opera stage in Milan in 1900. She made her American opera debut in 1908, in La traviata with the Metropolitan Opera, and she sang with the company until 1917. She toured the American west coast in 1910 and 1912–1913. She sang in London in 1905, Italy in 1906 and 1907, in Mexico City in 1908, in Havana in 1915, and at the Pan-American Exposition in San Diego in 1916. In 1908, she was the soloist at ceremonies marking the anniversary of the founding of Quebec, with the Prince of Wales in attendance.

She made many recordings, between 1911 and 1914, including several duets with German contralto Rosa Olitzka. She wrote on singing, explaining that "From the very start the singer, particularly the one who aspires to become an operatic singer, should endeavor to discard fear entirely," adding "If the singer gives the audience the least suspicion that she is in fear of their verdict, the audience will detect it at once and the verdict will be bad."

In 1924, De Pasquali became the first American woman elected to membership in the Accademia Filarmonica Romana.

== Personal life ==
Bernice James married Salvatore de Pasquali, an Italian tenor, in 1896. She was widowed in 1923, and she died in Omaha, Nebraska in 1925, aged 51 years, after weeks of pneumonia while touring on the vaudeville circuit. Her grave is with her husband's, in her hometown in Massachusetts.
