= Herbert Witherspoon =

American operatic bass

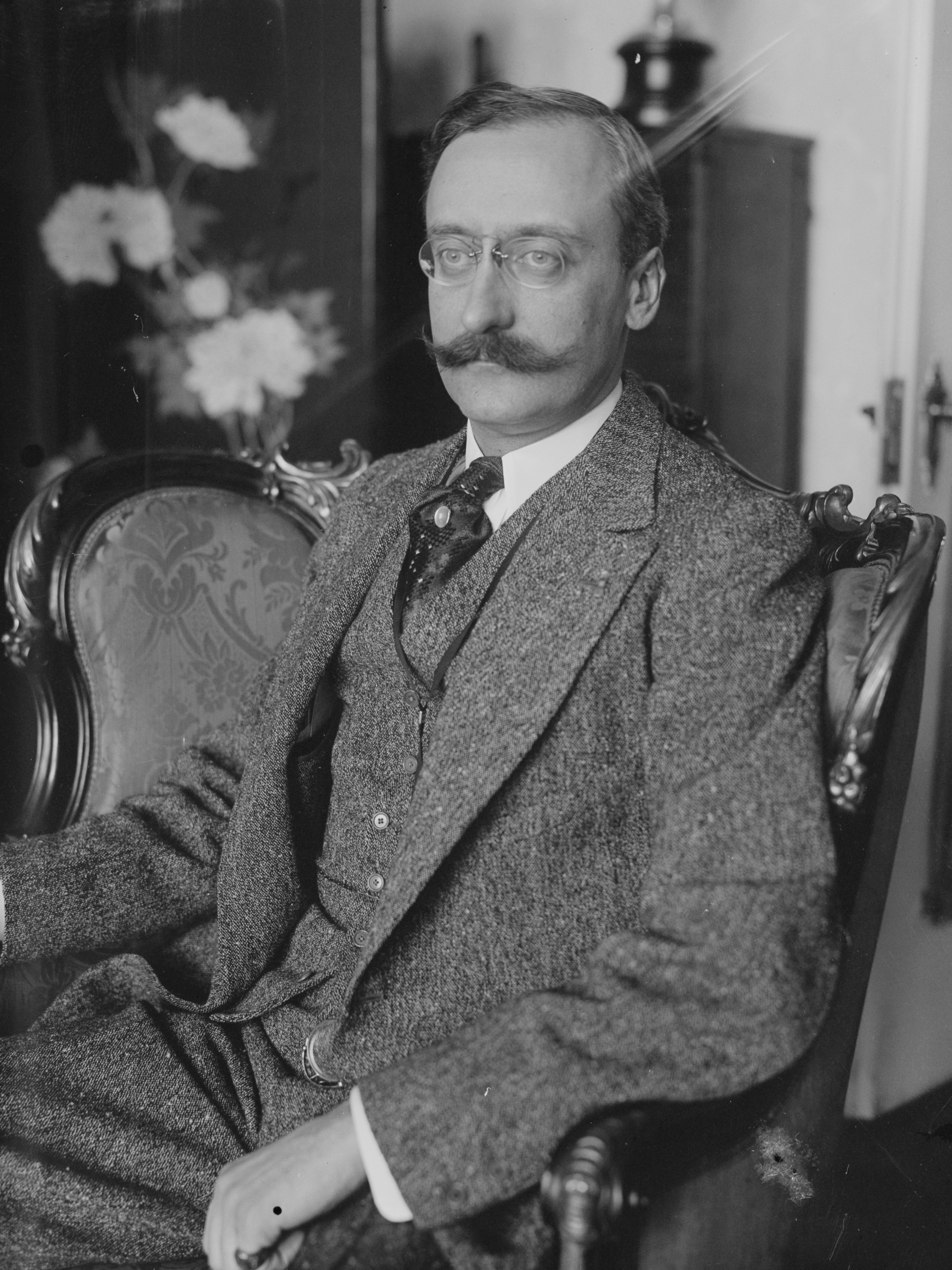
- Witherspoon circa 1915

General Manager of the Metropolitan Opera
- In office 1935–1935
- Preceded by: Giulio Gatti-Casazza
- Succeeded by: Edward Patrick Johnson

Personal details
- Born: July 21, 1873 Buffalo, New York
- Died: May 10, 1935 (aged 61) Manhattan, New York City
- Spouses: Greta Hughes (divorced); Florence Hinkle (m. 1916; died 1933) Blanche Sternberg Skeath (m. 1933)
- Education: Yale University

Herbert Witherspoon (July 21, 1873 – May 10, 1935) was an American bass singer and opera manager.

== Biography ==
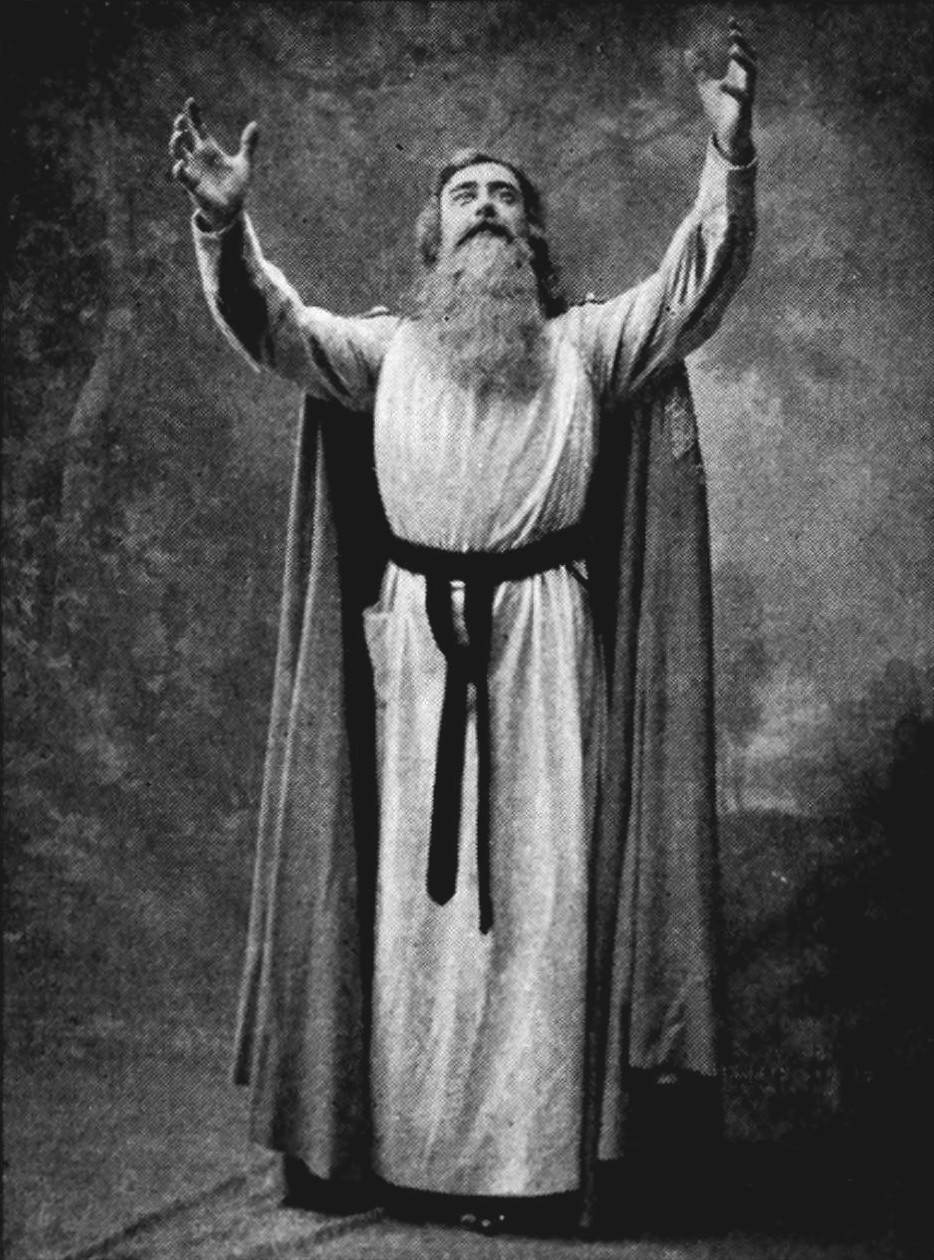
Witherspoon in costume as Gurnemanz in Parsifal

He was born on July 21, 1873, in Buffalo, New York.

He graduated from Yale University in 1895 where he had performed as a member of the Yale Glee Club. After leaving school he studied music with Horatio Parker, Edward MacDowell, and Gustav Stoeckel. Witherspoon also studied singing with Walter Henry Hall and Max Treumann in New York City. For further study he traveled to Europe. He worked in Paris with Jean-Baptiste Faure and Jacques Bouhy and in Milan with Francesco Lamperti and also studied in London and Berlin.

Witherspoon made his singing debut in 1898 with a small company in New York, and soon was making many appearances in concert and in oratorios. On November 26, 1908, he made his debut with the Metropolitan Opera as Titurel in Richard Wagner's Parsifal. He remained with the company until his retirement from singing in 1914, at which point he chose to concentrate on teaching. Witherspoon made many recordings for the Victor Talking Machine Company between 1907 and 1917.

On June 20, 1916 in Manhattan he married Florence Hinkle as his second wife.

In 1925, Witherspoon became president of the Chicago Musical College. In 1930 he became artistic director of the Chicago Civic Opera, and in 1931 took over as president of the Cincinnati Conservatory. On the strength of his work in these positions, Witherspoon was named to succeed Giulio Gatti-Casazza when the latter retired as General Manager of the Metropolitan Opera in 1935.

After the death of Florence Hinkle in 1933, he married Blanche Sternberg Skeath.

Witherspoon died suddenly on May 10, 1935, at the Metropolitan Opera House. He was barely six weeks into his term as general manager, when he collapsed at his desk from a heart attack while meeting with Met assistant manager, Edward Ziegler. His last words, after Ziegler gave him the news that subscriptions for the 1935–1936 season were exceeding expectations, were, "That's grand." In 1944 his widow became the managing director of the new Ballet International. His will set aside money for the Library of Congress to buy music scripts to be donated in the name of Florence Hinkle, his second wife. The remainder of his estate went to his third wife, Blanche Sternberg Skeath.

== Legacy ==
Witherspoon was succeeded as General Manager of the Metropolitan Opera by tenor Edward Johnson. During his career he also taught singing privately. One of his students was Met soprano Mabel Garrison; another was contralto Amy Ellerman.

== Works or publications ==
- 36 lessons in singing for teacher and student. OCLC 023968287
- Singing; a treatise for teachers and students. OCLC 000911719

Preceded by Giulio Gatti-Casazza	General Manager of the Metropolitan Opera; 1935	Succeeded by Edward Johnson
