= Joan Ruth =

American soprano and stage actress

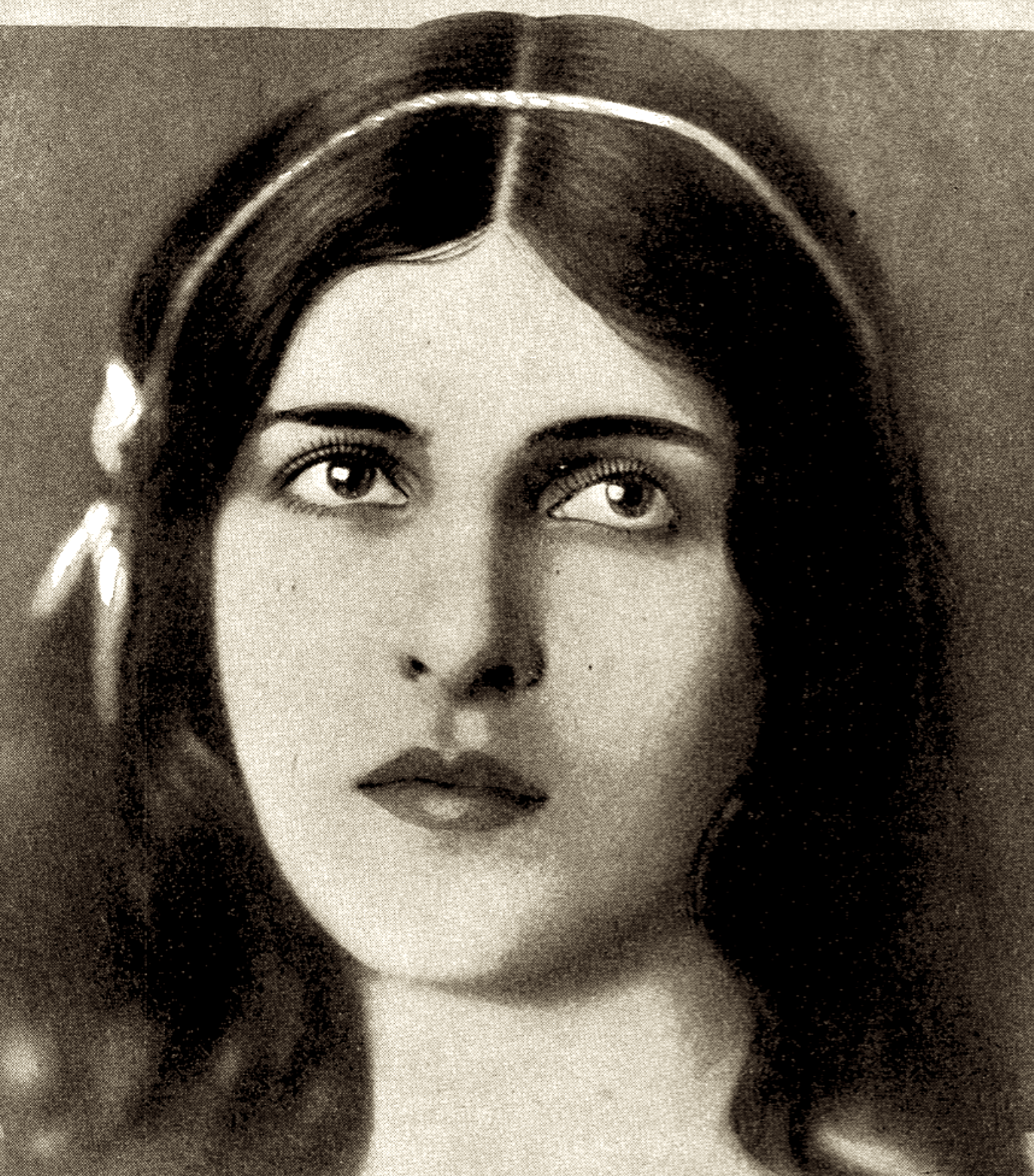
Joan Ruth in 1926

Joan Ruth (born c. 1904) was an American soprano and stage actress. Born in Massachusetts, she studied singing at the New England Conservatory and with Estelle Liebling in New York City. She had an active stage career in operas, concerts, and musicals from the early 1920s into the mid 1940s. She made her professional opera debut with the Wagnerian Opera Company in 1923. She sang two seasons with the Metropolitan Opera, and also performed roles with other American opera companies like the Cincinnati Opera and the St. Louis Municipal Opera. In 1926 she toured throughout the United States in concert with the tenor Edward Johnson. In 1927 she created the role of Sally Negly in the original Broadway production of Sigmund Romberg's My Maryland. She starred in the 1929 Warner Bros. short film Guido Ciccolini and Eric Zardo. She was also active as a singer on American radio stations in New York City.

== Early life and education ==
Joan Ruth was born in Boston c. 1904. She grew up in the Roxbury neighborhood of Boston in a family of seven children. She pursued a singing career against the wishes of her mother who preferred she get married as a means of obtaining security, and if that failed, training as a stenographer. She rejected a proposal of marriage from a man who ran a hardware business in Boston because he wanted her to give up her ambitions at a singing career. Her early musical training occurred in Boston, studying at the New England Conservatory. In 1922 she moved to New York City where she studied singing with Estelle Liebling.

== Early career ==
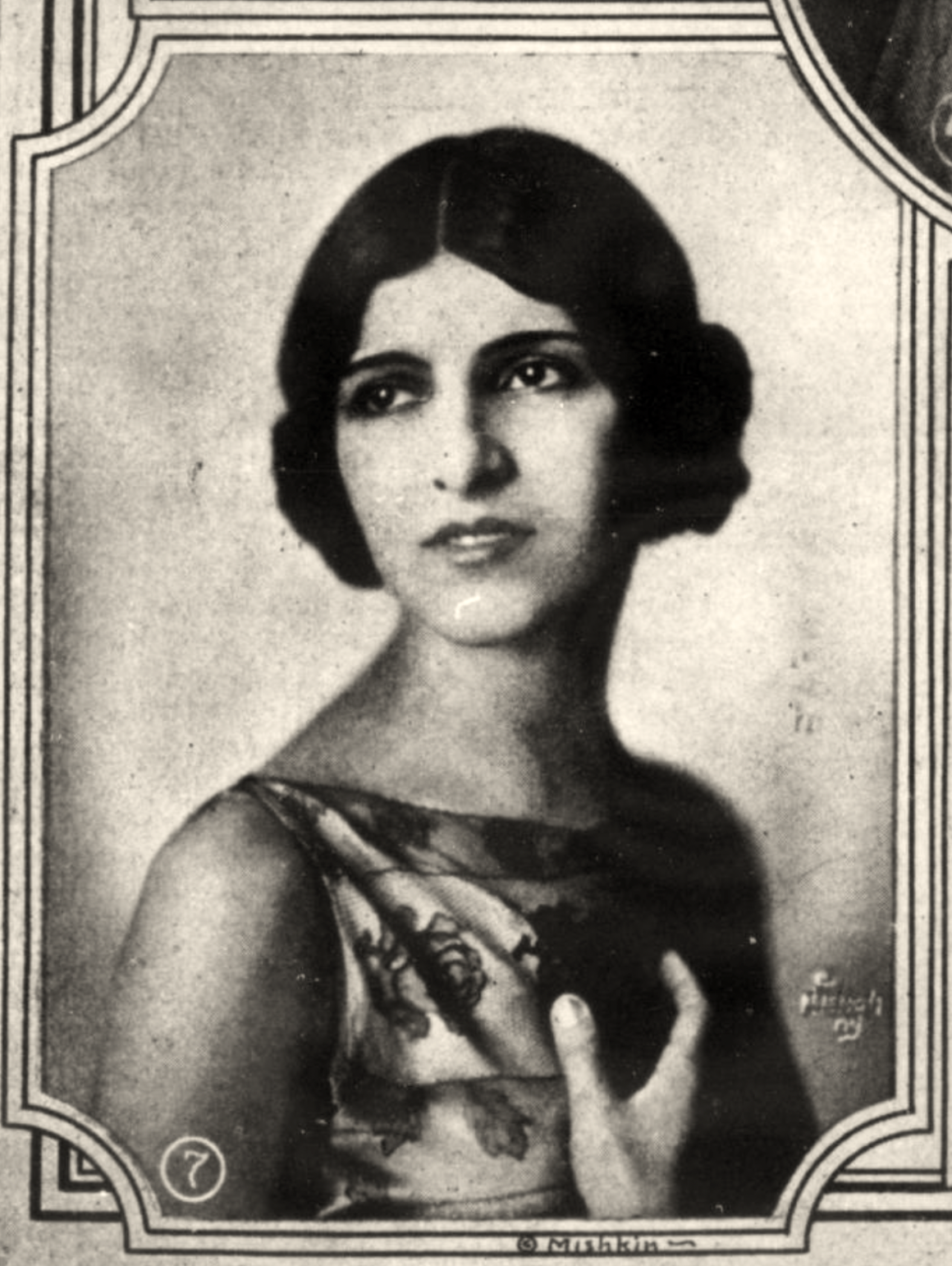
Joan Ruth in 1924

In December 1922, Ruth was engaged to perform at Hugo Riesenfeld's theatre in Manhattan where she was a soloist in a concert of music by Franz Schubert. On April 14, 1923, she made her debut at Carnegie Hall as a soloist in a chamber music concert sponsored by the Music Students' League. In August 1923 she sang to accompany the silent film Homeward Bound at the Stanley Theatre in Philadelphia.

For the 1923/1924 season, Ruth was engaged by Melvin H. Dahlberg's touring Wagnerian Opera Company (WOC). Musically, the WOC was led by the conductor Josef Stránský who had previously been conductor of the New York Philharmonic. She made her professional opera debut with the company at Poli's Theatre in Washington D.C. in October 1923 as Cherubino in Wolfgang Amadeus Mozart's The Marriage of Figaro. Her other repertoire with the WOC in the 1923-1924 season included the role of the Forrest Bird in Richard Wagner's Siegfried, the Shepherd Boy in Eugen d'Albert's Die toten Augen, the page in Wagner's Tannhäuser, and the Dewman in Engelbert Humperdinck's Hansel and Gretel.

After leaving Washington D.C., the WOC went on a tour which included a six-week engagement at the Manhattan Opera House in New York City. Other stops on the tour included performances in Philadelphia (Metropolitan Opera House), Baltimore (Lyric Opera House), Pittsburgh, Indianapolis (Murat Theatre), Cincinnati (Cincinnati Music Hall), Cleveland, Milwaukee (Davidson Theatre), Buffalo, New York, and Chicago (Great Northern Theatre).

In April 1924, Ruth performed on WOR radio. The same month she was a soloist at a concert sponsored by the Rubinstein Club at the Waldorf Astoria New York. In the summer of 1924 she performed in the original touring production of Victor Herbert's operetta The Dream Girl. She remained with the company when it ran on Broadway at the Ambassador Theatre, performing under a different name and being featured as a vocalist in the Colonial tableaux scene. She left the Broadway cast in October 1924 and her part was taken over by Jean Linza.

Ruth was engaged for the 28th season of the Maine Music Festival for performances in Bangor, Portland, and Lewiston in October 1924. Her repertoire at the festival included the role of Inez in Giuseppe Verdi's Il trovatore, and the aria "Quando me'n vo'" from Puccini's opera La bohème.

== Metropolitan Opera and 1926 national tour ==
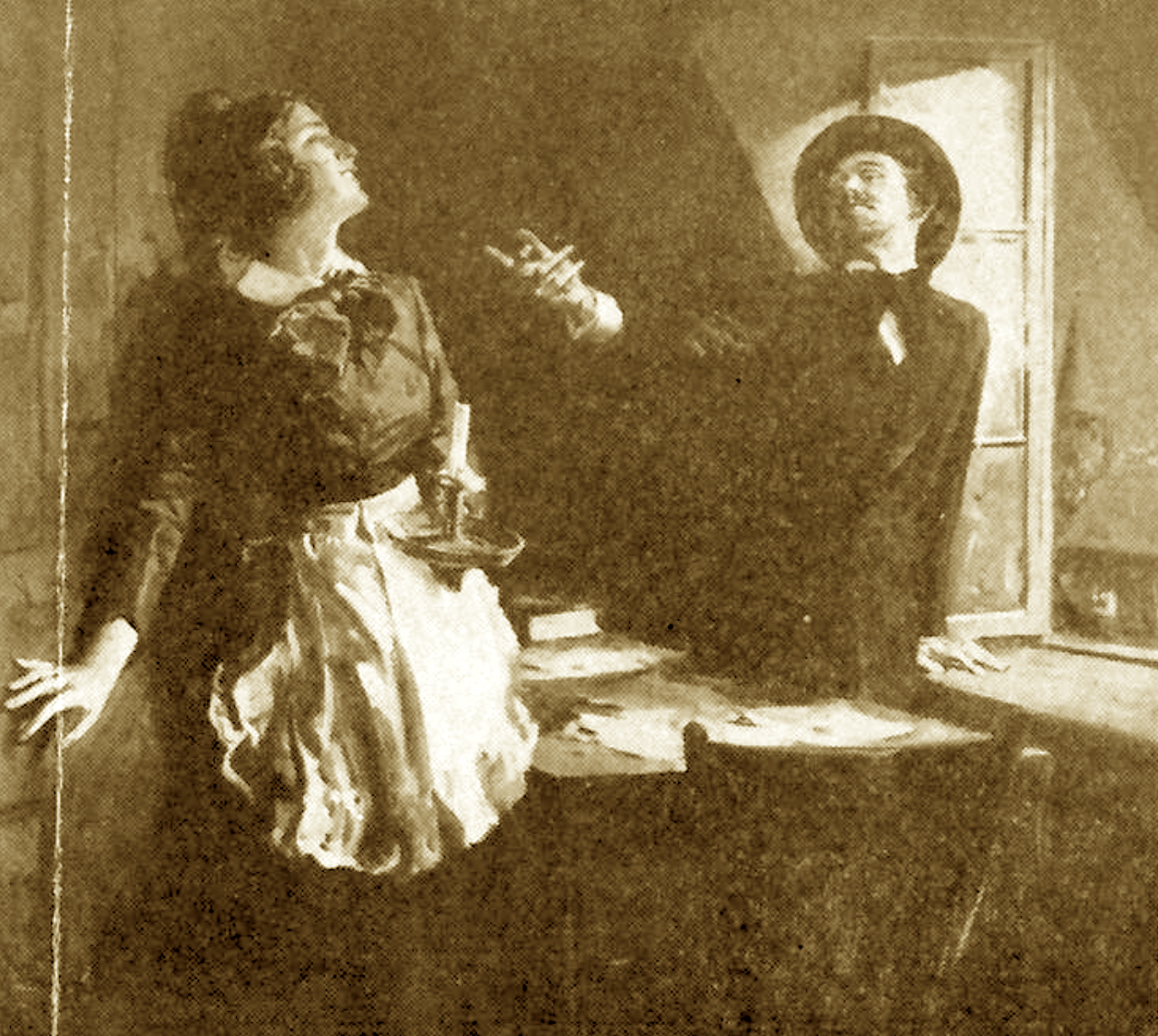
Joan Ruth as Mimi and Edward Johnson as Rodolfo in a picture from their 1926 concert tour program

Ruth was originally scheduled to make her debut at the Metropolitan Opera in the role of Olympia in The Tales of Hoffmann. However, this performance never happened, and she ultimately made her debut as Frasquita in Georges Bizet's Carmen with Florence Easton in the title role in November 1924. She returned to the Met in January 1925 as one of the pages in Tannhäuser, and again in March 1925 to perform the role of Siebel in Charles Gounod's Faust with Armand Tokatyan in the title role. She also sang in multiple concert events at the Metropolitan Opera House during both the 1924-1925 and 1925-1926 opera seasons.

In February 1925, Ruth made her Boston recital debut at the Boston Athletic Association. In June 1925 she joined a touring variety musical revue that also starred the Two Black Crows and W. C. Fields. In late July and August 1925 she performed the title roles in Friedrich von Flotow's Martha and Herbert's Naughty Marietta at the St. Louis Municipal Opera. with tenor Ralph Errolle as her love interest in both. In August 1925 she performed with conductor Edwin Franko Goldman and his band in a concert at New York University.

In October 1925, she performed once again at the Maine Festival. That same month she gave a recital at Aeolian Hall with her repertoire including the Mad Scene from Ambroise Thomas's Hamlet, and the aria "Meinem Hirten bleib ich treu" from Johann Sebastian Bach's cantata Ich hab in Gottes Herz und Sinn, BWV 92 among other works.

Ruth was engaged for performances in the Elwyn Artists Series, giving a national concert tour in 1926 with the Metropolitan Opera tenor Edward Johnson. Performing "coast to coast", the duo gave concerts of operatic arias and duets. The pair wore costumes in presentation of scenes from various operas, including scenes from Charles Gounod's Roméo et Juliette and Giuseppe Verdi's Rigoletto. In the midst of their tour, they were told by representatives of Giacomo Puccini's estate that they were not allowed to perform his music from La bohème in costume unless they were accompanied by a full orchestra. Since they did not have a large orchestra with them on tour, Johnson and Ruth changed into concert dress for those selections beginning with their stop in Washington D.C.

Some of the stops on the lengthy Elwyn Artists tour included concerts in Boston (Symphony Hall), Garden City, New York, Amsterdam, New York, Washington D.C. (Washington Auditorium), Toronto, Canada, Los Angeles (Shrine Auditorium), San Francisco (San Francisco Exposition Auditorium), Oakland, California (Oakland Civic Auditorium), Portland, Oregon (Portland Civic Auditorium), Oak Park, Illinois, Cleveland (Masonic Hall), and Akron, Ohio. In the midst of this tour Ruth, Johnson, and the pianist Elmer Zoller performed a concert of music broadcast nationally on radio across fifteen different radio stations on March 14, 1926.

== Late 1920s ==
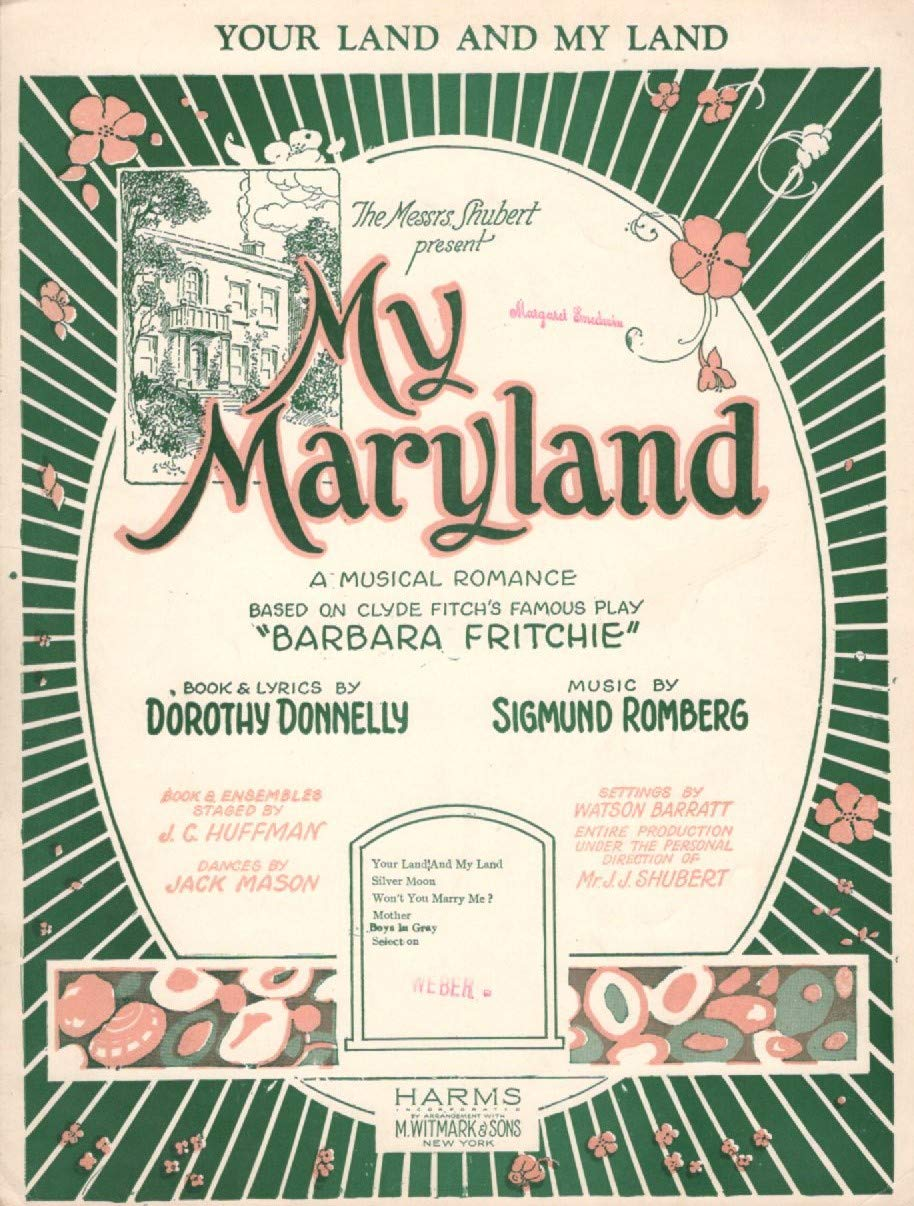
Front cover of sheet music from the musical My Maryland

By June 1926, Ruth had completed her tour with Johnson and was performing at the Saenger Festival in Peoria, Illinois. After this she appeared at the Cincinnati Opera from late June through August 1926 as Gilda in Rigoletto, Alice Ford in the first presentation of Falstaff in the city of Cincinnati, and the title role in Flotow's Martha. In the midst of the Cincinnati run she returned back to New York City briefly to perform again in concert with Edwin Franko Goldman and his band at NYU and then came back to Cincinnati to complete her opera engagement. The concert with Goldman was broadcast live on WEAF (now WFAN radio).

Ruth had previously worked as a regular contracted singer with WEAF in the mid 1920s, notably appearing on the front cover of Radio Digest on January 16, 1926. On July 25, 1926, gave a recital that was broadcast not only on WEAF but also on WGN (AM) in Chicago. In late July and early August 1926 she performed as a soloist with an orchestra for broadcasts on WEAF's the Atwater Kent Hour. In September 1926 she starred as Princess Eudoxie in a concert version of La Juive given at the Coney Island Stadium as a benefit for the Jewish Sanatorium (now Zucker Hillside Hospital). She returned to St. Louis in October 1926 to star in a musical revue. In December 1926 she performed at the Willard InterContinental Washington at an event attended by Charles G. Dawes who was then the Vice President of the United States. It was organized by Charles Caldwell McChord.

In February 1927, Ruth gave a recital at Churchill House on the campus of Brown University. The previous month she had signed a contract to star in Sigmund Romberg's new musical My Maryland. She performed the role of Sally Negly in the original production which toured prior to its arrival in New York City. She remained with the production when it debuted on Broadway in September 1927. She continued to play the part until the end of February 1928. On April 14, 1928, she was the featured soprano soloist in a concert sponsored by the Mozart Club of New York City. The following June she went on tour again with W. C. Fields and Two Black Crows through the Southern United States in a show called American Chaure-Souris. After returning from her tour, she was engaged for a brief period at the Stanley Theater in Jersey City, New Jersey before doing work as an actress on film at a studio in Camden, New Jersey. It was reported than on September 17, 1928, she left for Europe to give a ten week concert tour across Germany and England. However, Ruth was in the United States for a production of Pagliacci in which she portrayed the role of Nedda at the Loreto Theater in New York on October 21, 1928. On November 7, 1928, she gave a concert of coloratura soprano arias on WOV radio.

In 1929, Ruth made a sound film for Warner Bros., Guido Ciccolini and Eric Zardo, which was named for her male co-stars. From December 1929 to January 1930 she starred as Maria Credaro in Edward Childs Carpenter's play The Bachelor Father at the Orpheum Theater in St. Louis.

== 1930s and 1940s ==
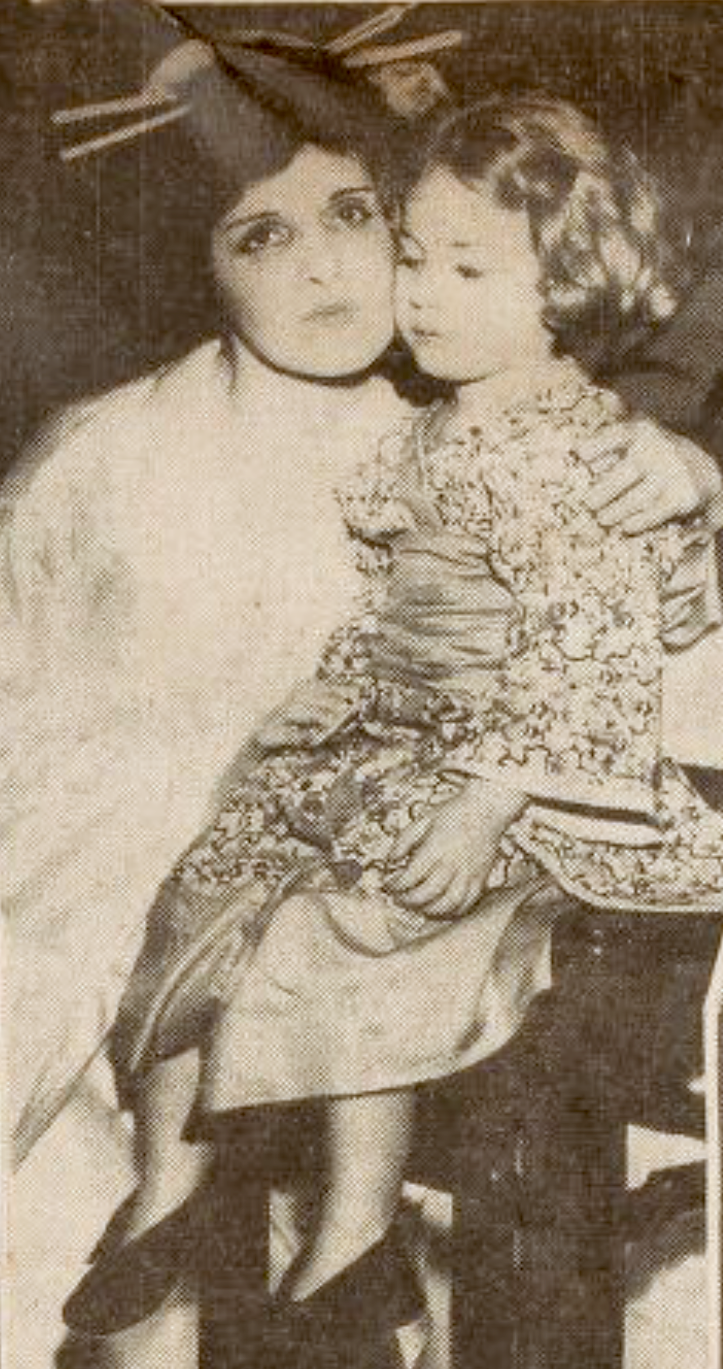
Joan Ruth as Cio-Cio-San in Madama Butterfly for the Federal Theatre Project

Ruth continued to perform periodically on American radio in the early 1930s. In May 1932 she performed excerpts from Lucia di Lammermoor at a concert sponsored by the Rubinstein Club at the Waldorf Astoria New York. In 1933 she portrayed Frasquita in Carmen opposite Coe Glade in the title role at the Lewisohn Stadium with the New York Philharmonic and the chorus of the Metropolitan Opera being led by Giuseppe Bamboschek. During the Great Depression of the 1930s she was in several productions mounted by the Federal Theatre Project, among them starring as Cio-Cio-San in a production of Madama Butterfly in Boston. In 1939 she was a soloist with the Providence Symphony Orchestra, performing Victor Herbert's "Italian Street Song".

In 1941, Ruth was the soprano soloist in a performance of Johann Sebastian Bach's wedding cantata Weichet nur at Huntington Chambers Hall in Boston, a concert sponsored by the Composer's Forum. She assisted the choral music composer, arranger, and conductor S. G. Braslavsky in a lecture on "Jewish music and music by Jews" given at the Boston Public Library at Copley Square on January 31, 1943, performing several traditional Jewish songs and music by Jewish composers to provide attendees examples during the lecture. On November 8, 1944, she gave a concert of "national songs" from around the world at Longwood University in Virginia.
