= Marie Rappold =

American opera singer

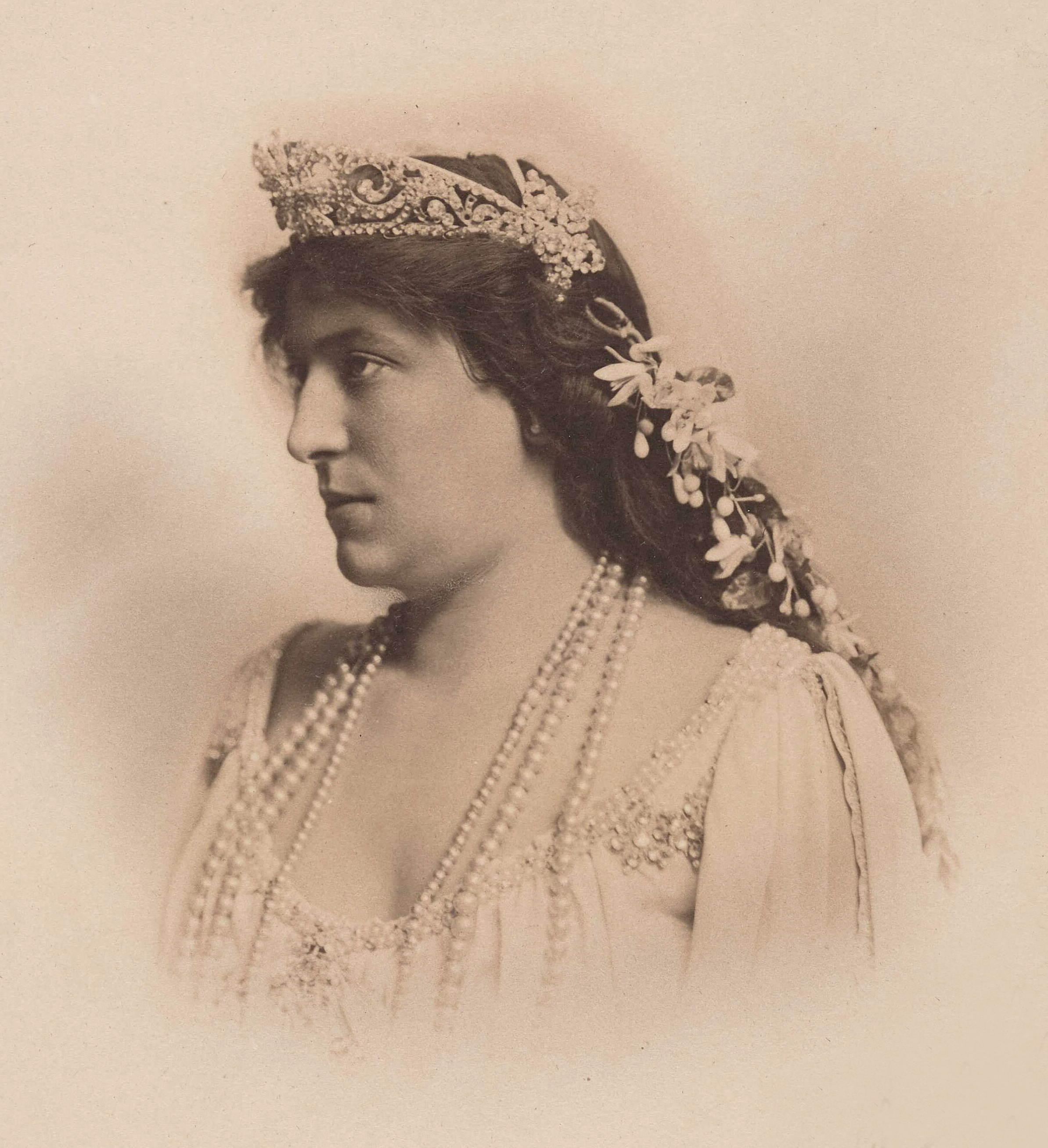
Marie Rappold, c. 1906

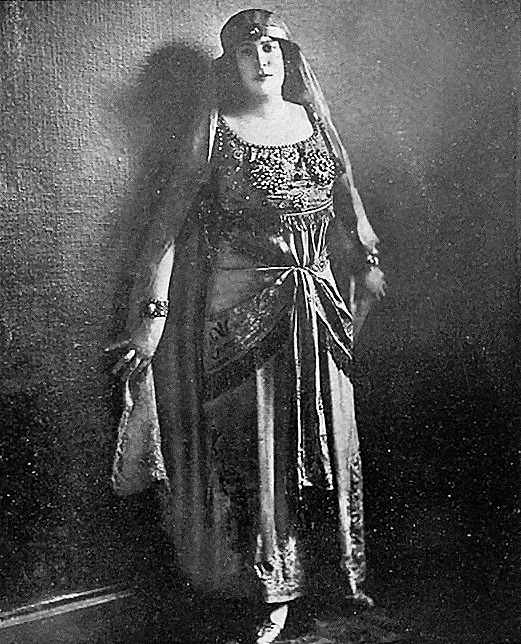
Marie Rappold while at the Metropolitan Opera (before 1920)

"O patria mia"
Marie Rappold performing "O patria mia" from Verdi's Aida (1916)

"Ave Maria" (Bach/Gounod)
"Ave Maria", Marie Rappold and Albert Spalding (violin)

Marie Rappold, née Winterrath (17 August 1872 – 12 May 1957) was a German-born American operatic dramatic soprano. She sang with the Metropolitan Opera from 1905 to 1920.

== Early life ==
She was born in Barmen, Germany on 17 August 1872.

She appeared on stage in London at the age of five before moving with her parents to Brooklyn, New York, where she later studied with Oscar Saenger and sang with the Amberg German Opera Company. In New York City she studied singing with Estelle Liebling.

== Opera and recording career ==
On 22 November 1905, Rappold made her debut at the Metropolitan Opera as Sulamith in Karl Goldmark's Die Königin von Saba (The Queen of Sheba, 1875). She continued to appear at the Met until 1920, during which time, she gave a total of 198 performances in 23 roles and 22 operas. Her first husband, Dr. Julius Rappold, objected to her career, and she divorced him in 1907. In 1913, she married tenor Rudolf Berger (17 April 1874, Moravia – 27 February 1915, New York City).

During World War I, Edison Records started a marketing campaign, hiring prominent opera singers and vaudeville performers to perform alongside and alternating with Edison records of their performances played on top-of-the-line Edison Diamond Disc Phonographs. At various stages during the performances, all lights in the theater would be darkened and the audience challenged to guess whether they were hearing a live performance or a recording. Written accounts of the time often said that much of the audience was astonished when the lights went back up to reveal only the Edison phonograph on stage. According to a book published by the Edison company titled Composers and Artists whose Art is Re-Created by Edison's New Art (ca. 1920), the first such "comparison test" took place at Carnegie Hall on April 28, 1916, with Rappold providing the live vocal performance.

She recorded for Edison and Victor Records, and appeared in short films for Universal Studios. She also appeared in a short film made by Lee De Forest in his Phonofilm sound-on-film process in 1922, which is now in the Maurice Zouary film collection at the Library of Congress.

On September 20, 1922, she and the members of the San Carlo Opera Company gave a presentation of "Aida" over radio station WJZ, then in Newark, New Jersey. She played the role of Aida. Rappold had previously sung on WJZ during the station's first month on the air.

In June 1925, Rappold played the female lead in the premiere of Frank Patterson's opera The Echo with tenor Forrest Lamont (1881–1937).

== Death and legacy ==
She died on 12 May 1957 at Victory Hospital in North Hollywood, California.

On October 11, 2010, Rappold's former home in Upstate New York was featured on History Channel's series American Pickers.
