= Edward Johnson (tenor) =

Canadian opera singer (1878–1959)

Edward Johnson CBE
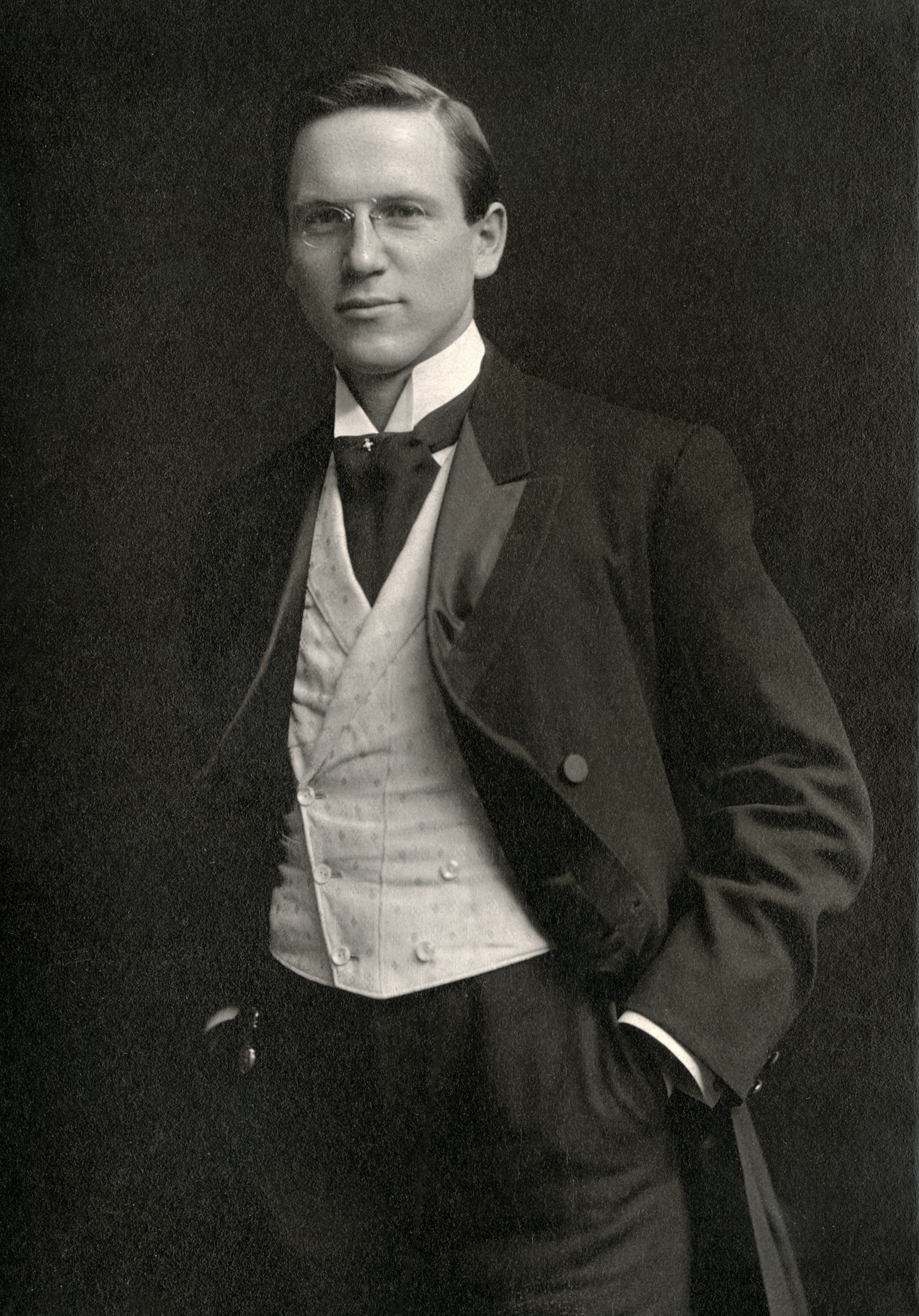
- Edward Johnson, c. 1905

General Manager of the Metropolitan Opera
- In office 1935–1950
- Preceded by: Herbert Witherspoon
- Succeeded by: Rudolf Bing

Personal details
- Born: Edward Patrick Johnson; 22 August 1878 Guelph, Ontario, Canada
- Died: 20 April 1959 (aged 80) Guelph Memorial Gardens, Guelph, Ontario, Canada
- Occupation: Operatic tenor; opera manager

Edward Patrick Johnson, CBE (22 August 1878 – 20 April 1959) was a Canadian operatic tenor who was billed outside North America as Edoardo Di Giovanni. He became general manager of the Metropolitan Opera in Manhattan, New York City from 1935 to 1950.

== Early life ==
Born in Guelph, Ontario, Canada, Johnson was the son of James Johnson and the former Margaret Jane Brown. The young tenor sang in his local church choir and at events in the Guelph area. At a concert in Stratford, Ontario in 1897, contralto Edith Miller encouraged him to move to New York and pursue a singing career. He sang as a soloist with several church choirs in the New York area. After this period he did much concert work, touring through the Mid-West with the Chicago Symphony Orchestra and singing in many Music Festivals throughout the country. After a peripatetic existence for some years, working in a variety of venues and training with several masters, he made his concert debut at Carnegie Hall in 1904.

Johnson sang the lead role in the North American premiere of Oscar Straus's A Waltz Dream in 1907. In 1908 he moved to Paris, France and began training under Richard Barthélemy. He married Beatrice d'Arneiro, in London, in August 1909. His only child, Fiorenza, was born 21 December 1910. She married George Drew who later became Premier of Ontario and Federal Leader of the Opposition, and died in 1965.

== Opera career ==
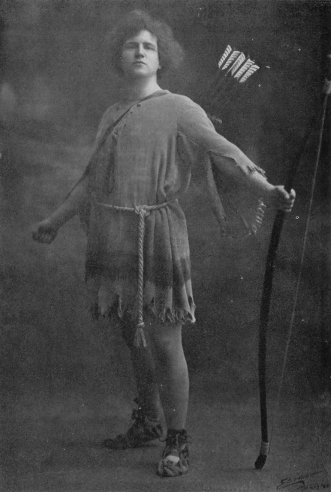
Edward Johnson

Johnson went to Italy in 1909, studying voice with Vincenzo Lombardi, in Florence. When singing outside North America, Johnson called himself Edoardo Di Giovanni. He made his opera debut on 10 January 1912 as Andrea Chénier at Padua's Teatro Verdi. After his début in Padua, he became leading tenor at La Scala, Milan, for five consecutive seasons. In Rome he spent four seasons at the Costanzi Theatre, where, among other roles, he sang Luigi and Rinuccio in the Italian premiere of Il trittico. In 1914 he sang the title role in the first performance in Italian of Richard Wagner's Parsifal, under the baton of Arturo Toscanini. He sang in Madrid, Rio de Janeiro, and Buenos Aires. His London debut was in Gounod's Faust, alongside Nellie Melba.

Johnson made his North American opera debut on 20 November 1919 as Loris in Giordano's Fedora with the Chicago Opera. He remained in Chicago for three years. Johnson made his Metropolitan Opera debut on 16 November 1922, as Avito in Italo Montemezzi's L'amore dei tre re. He remained with the Met for thirteen years as a singer. He notably created the title role in the world premiere of Deems Taylor's The King's Henchman in 1927. His last performance was on 20 March 1935.

Johnson was engaged for performances in the Elwyn Artists Series; giving a national concert tour in 1926 with the Metropolitan Opera soprano Joan Ruth. Performing "coast to coast", the duo gave concerts of operatic arias and duets. The pair wore costumes in presentation of scenes from various operas; including scenes from Charles Gounod's Roméo et Juliette and Giuseppe Verdi's Rigoletto. In the midst of their tour, they were told by representatives of Giacomo Puccini's estate that they were not allowed to perform his music from La bohème in costume unless they were accompanied by a full orchestra. Since they did not have a large orchestra with them on tour, Johnson and Ruth changed into concert dress for those selections beginning with their stop in Washington D.C.

Some of the stops on the lengthy Elwyn Artists tour included concerts in Boston (Symphony Hall), Garden City, New York, Amsterdam, New York, Washington D.C. (Washington Auditorium), Toronto, Canada, Los Angeles (Shrine Auditorium), San Francisco (San Francisco Exposition Auditorium), Oakland, California (Oakland Civic Auditorium), Portland, Oregon (Portland Civic Auditorium), Oak Park, Illinois, Cleveland (Masonic Hall), and Akron, Ohio. In the midst of this tour Ruth, Johnson, and the pianist Elmer Zoller performed a concert of music broadcast nationally on radio across fifteen different radio stations on March 14, 1926.

== As an opera director ==
In May 1935, Johnson became general manager of the Metropolitan Opera, succeeding Herbert Witherspoon, who died just six weeks into his tenure. Johnson held the position for fifteen years. During this time, in 1943, he became a member of The Lambs.

== Retirement ==
Johnson retired from the Met on 15 June 1950 and was succeeded by Rudolf Bing. He returned to Guelph, promoting musical education and serving as chairman of the board of the Royal Conservatory of Music in Toronto. He established the Edward Johnson Music Foundation, sponsor of the annual Guelph Spring Festival.

He suffered a heart attack and died while attending a National Ballet recital at the Guelph Memorial Gardens.

== Thoughts on singing ==
- Not many rules

"If you get right down to the bottom, there are in reality not so many singing rules to learn. You sing on the five vowels, and when you can do them loudly, softly, and with mezzo voce, you have a foundation upon which to build vocal mastery. And yet some people study eight, ten years without really laying the foundation. Why should it take the singer such a long time to master the material of his equipment? A lawyer or doctor, after leaving college, devotes three or four years only to preparing himself for his profession, receives his diploma, then sets up in business. It ought not to be so much more difficult to learn to sing than to learn these other professions." Edward Johnson

- The ear

"Of course the ear is the most important factor, our greatest ally. It helps us imitate. Imitation forms a large part of our study. We hear a beautiful tone; we try to imitate it; we try in various ways, with various placements, until we succeed in producing the sound we have been seeking. Then we endeavor to remember the sensations experienced in order that we may repeat the tone at will. So you see Listening, Imitation and Memory are very important factors in the student's development." Edward Johnson

- Bel canto

"The old Italian operas cultivate the bel canto, that is—beautiful singing. Of course it is well for the singer to cultivate this first of all, for it is excellent, and necessary for the voice. But modern Italian opera portrays the real men and women of to-day, who live, enjoy, suffer, are angry and repentant. Bel canto will not express these emotions. When a man is jealous or in a rage, he will not stand quietly in the middle of the stage and sing beautiful tones." Edward Johnson

- Interpretation

"I feel that if I have worked out a characterization, I must stick to my idea, in spite of what others say. It is my own conception, and I must either stand or fall by it. At times I have tried to follow the suggestions of this or that critic and have changed my interpretation to suit their taste. But it always rendered me self conscious, made my work unnatural and caused me speedily to return to my own conception." Edward Johnson

== Honours and awards ==
- The University of Toronto's Faculty of Music Building and Music Library were named in his honour and currently house his memorabilia.
- The Edward Johnson Elementary School was opened in Guelph in 1955.
- On 17 October 2006, Canada Post issued a set of five domestic rate (51¢) stamps to celebrate great Canadian opera singers, including Johnson.

=== Orders and decorations ===
- Johnson was appointed a Commander of the Order of the British Empire (CBE) by King George V
- Chevalier de la Légion d'honneur
- Officer of the Crown of Italy, Order of the Star of Italian Solidarity
- Commander of the Royal Swedish Order of Vasa
- Brazilian Order of the Southern Cross

=== Honorary degrees ===
- 31 May 1929: Doctor of Laws (LL.D) – University of Western Ontario.
- 1934: Doctor of Music (D.Mus.) – University of Toronto.
- 1943: Doctor of Letters (D.Litt.) – Union College, New York.

Preceded by Herbert Witherspoon	General Manager of the Metropolitan Opera; 1935–1950	Succeeded by Rudolf Bing
