= Mabel Garrison =

American opera singer (1886–1963)

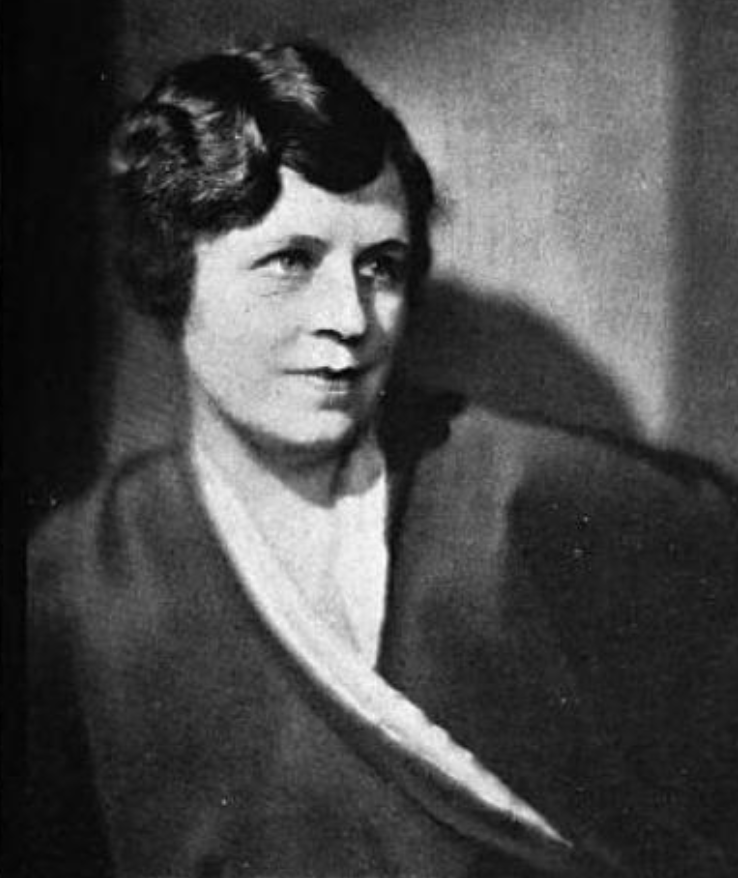
- Mabel Garrison, from a 1927 publication
- Born: April 24, 1886; Baltimore, Maryland, U.S.
- Died: August 20, 1963; New York, New York, U.S.
- Occupation: Opera singer

Mabel Garrison Siemonn (April 24, 1886 – August 20, 1963), was an American coloratura soprano who sang at the Metropolitan Opera from 1914 to 1921.

== Biography ==
Garrison was born in Baltimore, Maryland on April 24, 1886. She lived in the Guilford neighborhood at 3 Overhill Road.

She graduated from Western Maryland College (now McDaniel College) in 1903. She went on to study singing at the Peabody Conservatory. In 1908 she married the professor of harmony, George Siemonn and then studied further with Oscar Saenger and Herbert Witherspoon in New York. She made her debut in 1912 with the Aborn Opera Company as Philine in Mignon. She made her Metropolitan Opera debut on February 15, 1914 in a Sunday afternoon concert singing arias from operas by Verdi and Mozart. Her first role at the Met was Frasquita in Bizet's Carmen. Other roles included Adina in L'Elisir d'Amore, Bertha in Euryanthe, Biancofiore in Francesca da Rimini, Crobyle in Thaïs, the Dew Fairy in Hansel and Gretel, Gilda in Rigoletto, Olympia in The Tales of Hoffmann, Lady Harriet in Martha, Oscar in Un Ballo in Maschera, the Queen of the Night in The Magic Flute, the Queen of Shemakha in The Golden Cockerel, Rosina in Il Barbiere di Siviglia, and Urbain in Les Huguenots among others. Her last performance at the Met was as the title role in Lucia di Lammermoor on January 22, 1921.

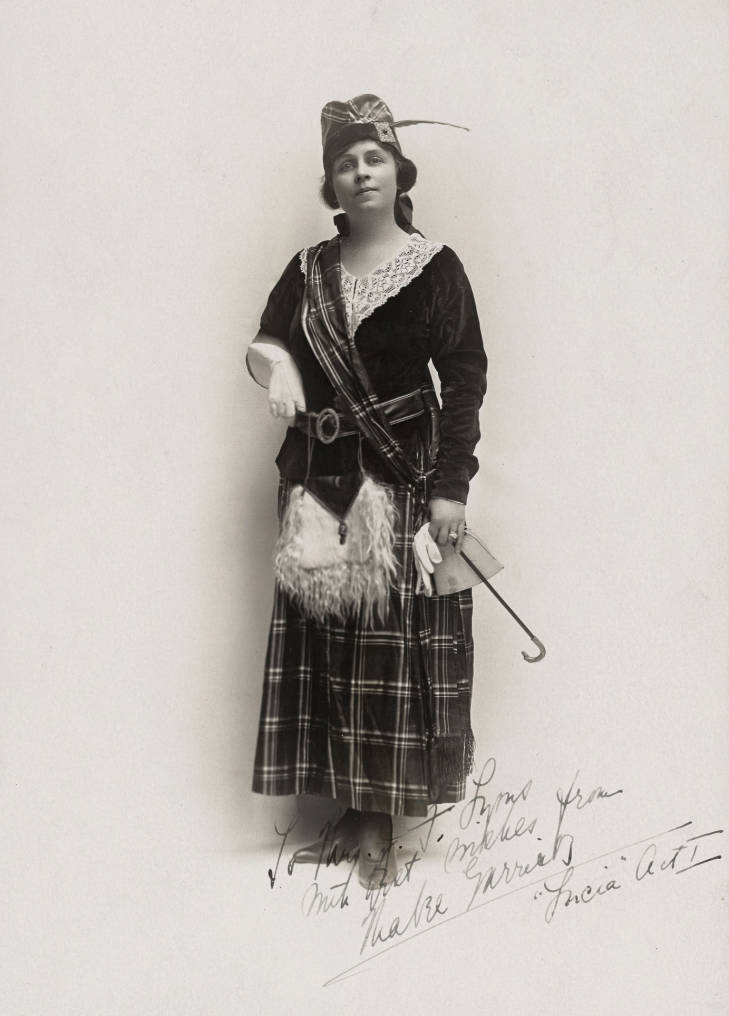
Mabel Garrison in 1916.

In 1921, Garrison made guest appearances at the Berlin State Opera in Hamburg and at the Cologne Opera. Later that year, she made a world concert tour. She was a member of the Chicago Civic Opera during the 1925-26 season. She was a teacher at Smith College after 1933. Garrison had an admirably trained coloratura soprano voice, as she demonstrated in both opera and concert and in several fine recordings she made for the Victor Talking Machine Company.

She died in New York City on August 20, 1963.
