= Rosina Galli (dancer) =

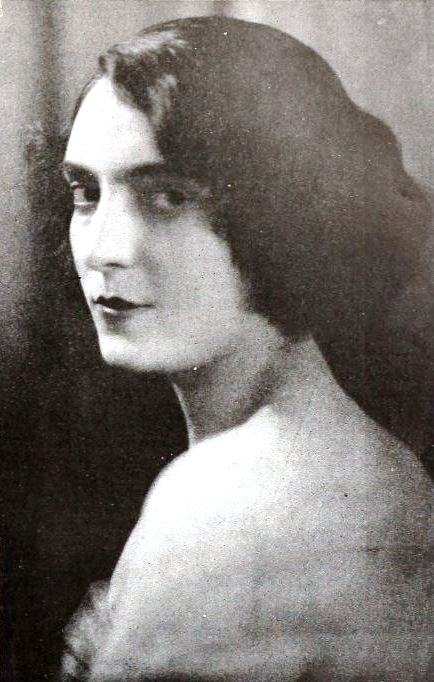
Rosina Galli

Rosina Galli (1892 – April 30, 1940) was an Italian ballet dancer, choreographer, ballet mistress, and dance teacher. After early years in Italy, she moved to the US, where she was associated with the Metropolitan Opera in New York City. Prima ballerina at La Scala Theatre Ballet, and the Chicago Ballet, she was also the première danseuse at the Teatro di San Carlo and the Metropolitan Opera.

== Biography ==
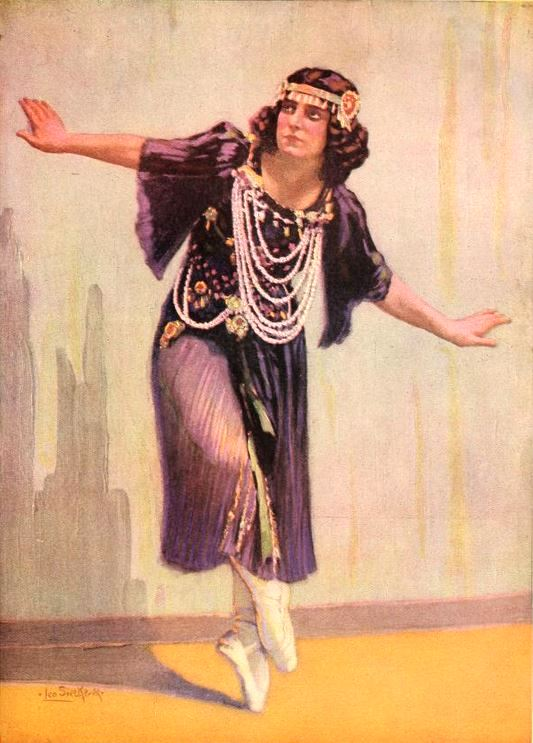
Galli (1920)

Galli was born in Naples, where her father was a lawyer. She studied dance at the Teatro di San Carlo's ballet school, becoming the company's première danseuse at the age of 14. When she was offered the première danseuse position at La Scala Theatre Ballet, the family moved to Milan. She debuted in 1910, at the age of eighteen, dancing in Pietro Micca and Ballo Excelsior of Luigi Manzotti.

In 1911, her father and two brothers escorted Galli to Genoa, from where Galli and her mother proceeded to Chicago, US. Galli performed first as soloist, and then as prima ballerina of the Chicago Ballet. In 1913, she was hired by the Metropolitan Opera House. Though she sported a petite figure, characterized as elfish, Galli demonstrated a rigorous technique and performed powerful pirouettes, continuing to dance there until 1931. Her partner at the Met was Giuseppe Bonfiglio. Her studies in America were under Luigi Albertieri.

In 1919, she began teaching dance at the Met, also serving as ballet mistress until 1935. As a teacher, she applied the strict program from her days at La Scala, teaching the Cecchetti method. Helen Tamiris, who formed the School of American Dance in 1930, was a pupil under Galli. Her expanded responsibilities included choreography, and in that respect, Galli is credited for over 100 offerings at the Met, such as Carmen (1924), La traviata (1925), and Merry Mount (1934).

It was at the Met where Galli met her future husband, Giulio Gatti-Casazza, former superintendent at La Scala and director of the Met since 1908. Initially she was his mistress; they married in 1930 at St. Joseph's Roman Catholic Church in Jersey City, New Jersey. When her husband retired in 1935, the couple returned to Italy, residing at a villa on Lake Maggiore. She died in Milan on April 30, 1940. Gatti, 23 years older, died the following September.

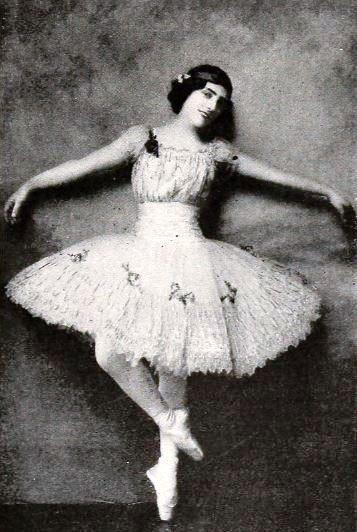
Galli (1919)

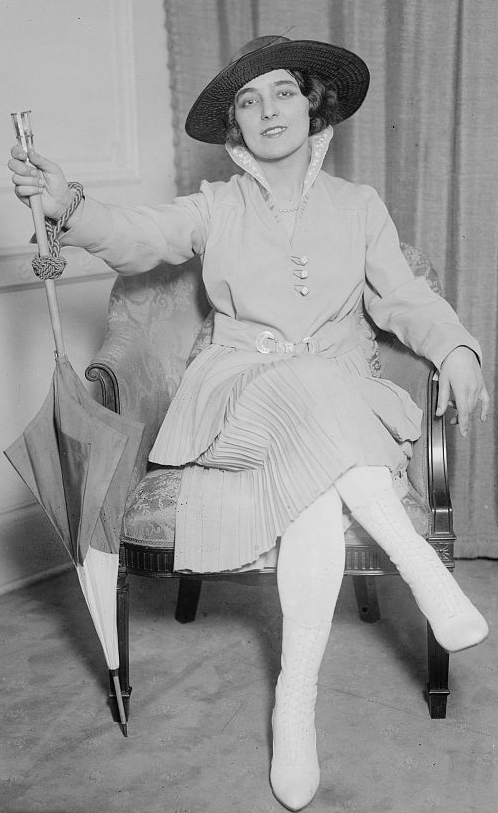
Italian dancer and choreographer Rosina Galli

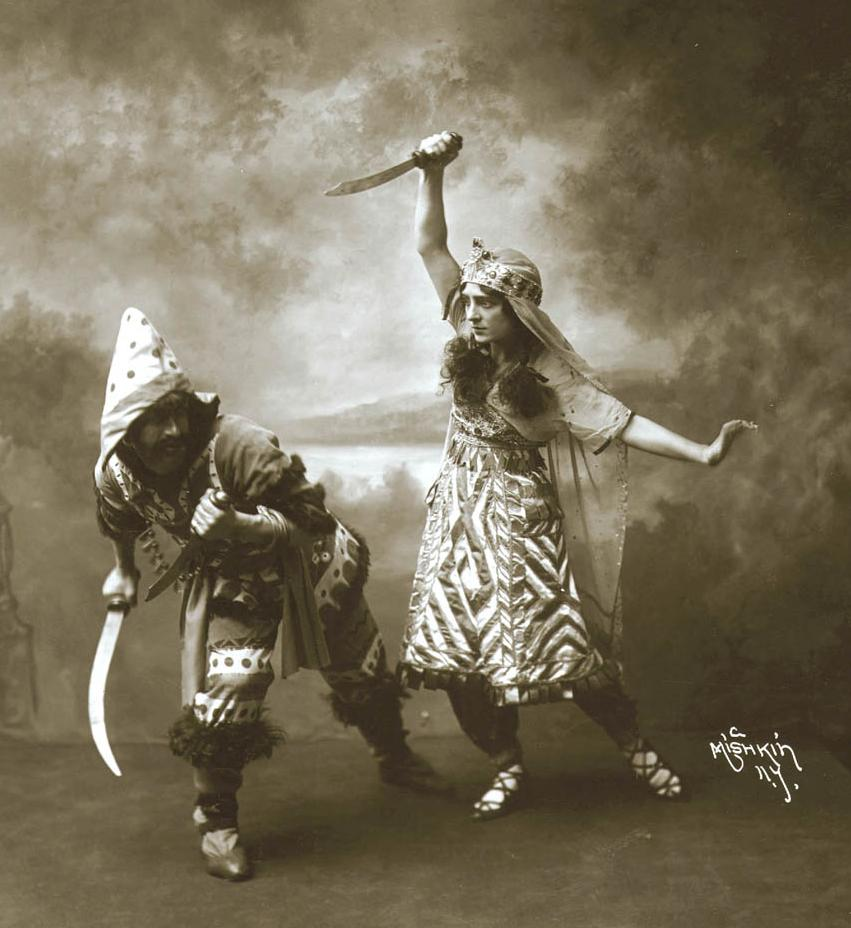
Giuseppe Bonfiglio and Rosina Galli in costume for the Polovtsian Dances in Borodin's "Prince Igor " 1915

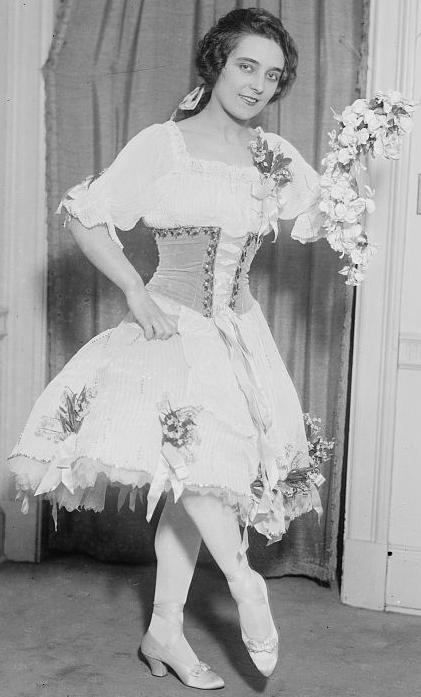

== Sources ==
- Tullia Bohen Limarzi, She Trills with Her Toes. The Metropolitan Ballet Career of Rosina Galli, in: Proceedings of the 9th Annual Conference of the Dance History Scholars, pp. 80–90, 1986
- "Galli Rosina", in: Felice Cappa, Piero Gelli, Marco Mattarozzi, Dizionario dello spettacolo del '900, Baldini & Castoldi, 1998 ISBN 88-8089-295-9 (p. 442) (in Italian)
- "Galli Rosina in Gatti Casazza", in: Rachele Farina (a cura di), Dizionario biografico delle donne lombarde: 568–1968, Baldini & Castoldi, 1995 ISBN 88-808-9085-9 (pp. 499–500) (in Italian)
- Ennio Speranza, Dizionario Biografico degli Italiani – Volume 52 (1999), Istituto dell'Enciclopedia italiana Treccani (in Italian)
