= Giulio Gatti-Casazza =

Italian opera manager

General Manager of the Metropolitan Opera
- In office 1908–1935
- Preceded by: Heinrich Conried
- Succeeded by: Herbert Witherspoon

General Manager of La Scala
- In office 1898–1908

Personal details
- Born: 3 February 1869 Udine, Italy
- Died: 2 September 1940 (aged 71) Ferrara, Italy
- Spouse(s): Frances Alda (m. 1910; div. 1928) Rosina Galli

Giulio Gatti-Casazza (3 February 1869 – 2 September 1940) was an Italian opera manager. He was general manager of La Scala in Milan, Italy, from 1898 to 1908 and later the Metropolitan Opera in New York City from 1908 to 1935.

== Biography ==
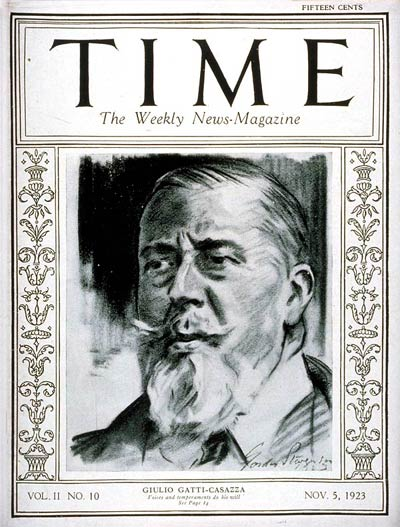
Time cover, 5 November 1923

Gatti-Casazza was born on 3 February 1869 in Udine, in northeastern Italy. In 1893, he succeeded his father as manager of the municipal theatre in Ferrara. He was manager of La Scala from 1898 to 1908, before his move to New York City, where he became general manager of the Metropolitan Opera from 1908 to 1935. Under his leadership, the Metropolitan enjoyed a prolonged era of artistic innovation and musical excellence. He brought with him conductor Arturo Toscanini, who became the company's principal conductor and led performances of Verdi, Wagner and others that set high standards for the Metropolitan, which have endured to the present day. The Viennese composer Gustav Mahler also was a Met conductor during Gatti-Casazza's first two seasons, and in later years, conductors Tullio Serafin and Artur Bodanzky led the company in the Italian and German repertories, respectively.

Affectionately called "Gatti" by friends and colleagues, Gatti-Casazza's prodigious artistic and organizational skills attracted the best singers and conductors to the Metropolitan, and, on 10 December 1910, hosted its first World premiere, La Fanciulla del West by Giacomo Puccini. Many noted singers of the era appeared at the Met under Gatti-Casazza's leadership, including Rosa Ponselle, Emmy Destinn, Frances Alda, Amelita Galli-Curci, Maria Jeritza, Lily Pons; Enrico Caruso, Jacques Urlus, Giovanni Martinelli, Beniamino Gigli, Feodor Chaliapin, Titta Ruffo, Giacomo Lauri-Volpi, and Lauritz Melchior.

For his accomplishments, Gatti-Casazza was one of the first Italians (and the first Italian living in the United States) to be featured on the cover of Time magazine. He appeared on the weekly's cover twice; on 5 November 1923, and again on 1 November 1926.

In 1910, he married the soprano Frances Alda. They divorced in 1928 and he married the Met's prima ballerina Rosina Galli. He retired in 1935 and spent the last years of his life in his native Italy. He died on 2 September 1940 in Ferrara, Italy.

== Cultural depictions ==
- The Great Caruso (1951); portrayed by Eduard Franz
- Anna Pavlova (1983); portrayed by Martin Scorsese

== See also ==
- Metropolitan Opera
- List of covers of Time magazine (1920s) - 5 November 1923 and 1 November 1926

Awards and achievements
Preceded by Roy Chapman Andrews	Cover of Time magazine 5 November 1923	Succeeded by Woodrow Wilson
