= Natalie Bodanya =

American operatic soprano

Natalie Bodanya as Micaela in Georges Bizet's Carmen at the Met.

Natalie Bodanya (August 23, 1908 – March 4, 2007) was an American operatic soprano who had an active international career from the late 1920s through the 1940s. She notably sang at the Metropolitan Opera in New York City from 1937 through 1942 and was a performer with the New York City Opera during the company's 1943-1944 inaugural season.

== Early life and education ==
Born Natalia Bodanskaya in Manhattan, Bodanya grew up in an apartment building on the borough's Upper East Side. One of her neighbors was an employee at the Union Settlement, a music school in Bodanya's neighborhood. Her neighbor provided her with the opportunity to receive her first music lessons at the school and eventually provided her with the opportunity to audition for famed coloratura soprano Marcella Sembrich. Impressed, Sembrich took on Bodanya as her student and through her support, Bodanya was able to enroll at the Curtis Institute of Music. After graduating she continued with further vocal studies under Sylvan Levin. She later studied privately in New York City with Sidney Dietch.

== Career ==
While studying at Curtis, Bodanya made her professional opera debut on December 26, 1929, as Blonde in Wolfgang Amadeus Mozart's Die Entführung aus dem Serail with the Philadelphia Grand Opera Company at the Academy of Music under conductor Emil Młynarski. At the time of her debut, Natalie Bodanya billed herself as Natalie Bodanskaya. She shortened her name as of December 22, 1936, to lessen confusion with the mezzo-soprano Ina Bourskaya and the conductor Artur Bodanzky.

After several years of performing with second tier companies in the United States, Bodanya was invited by Edward Johnson to join the roster of principal artists at the Metropolitan Opera. She made her debut with the company as Micaela in Georges Bizet's Carmen on May 11, 1936, with Bruna Castagna in the title role, Armand Tokatyan as Don José, Carlo Morelli as Escamillo, and Gennaro Papi conducting. Her portrayal of Micaela later appeared on the January 7, 1937 Metropolitan Opera radio broadcast on January 7, 1937, in which her performance shines through as one of the great creations of that role.

Bodanya remained on the Met roster for the next seven consecutive seasons, taking only a brief hiatus from performance for a few months after her 1938 marriage to William Gorman, a philosophy professor who collaborated with Mortimer Adler. She notably sang Elisetta in the Met's first staging of Domenico Cimarosa's Il matrimonio segreto on February 25, 1937, with Muriel Dickson as Carolina, Irra Petina as Fidalma, George Rasely as Paolino, Louis D'Angelo as Geronimo, and Ettore Panizza conducting. Among the other roles she portrayed on the Met stage were an American Girl in Walter Damrosch's The Man Without a Country, Ellen in Lakmé, an Errand Girl in Louise, the Forest Bird in Siegfried, the First Esquire in Parsifal, an orphan in Der Rosenkavalier, Musetta in La Bohème, Papagena in The Magic Flute, Poussette in Manon, and Yniold in Pelléas et Mélisande. Her last and 157th performance at the Met was as Esmeralda in Bedřich Smetana's The Bartered Bride on January 16, 1942, with Jarmila Novotná as Marenka, Tokatyan as Jeník, Karl Laufkötter as Vasek, Norman Cordon as Kecal, Thelma Votipka as Ludmila, and Paul Breisach conducting.

Bodanya took some time off from performing to have her son Paul. After a two-year absence from the stage, she joined the fledgling New York City Opera company in 1944. Her first appearance with the company was as Musetta in the NYCO's first staging of La Bohème. She also sang the role of Nedda in Pagliacci with the NYCO in 1944.

In addition to her appearances in the United States, Bodanya was also active as a guest artist in operas and concerts in Europe. She notably canceled her contracts with the Vienna State Opera and La Scala in 1938 to protest the anti-Semitic measures being taken by the governments of Italy and Austria. She also appeared in nightclubs, performed on the radio, and recorded a few songs with Mario Lanza.

In the 1950s Bodanya embarked on a second career as a singing teacher in California. She died in Santa Barbara, California, aged 98.
