= Rosalbina Caradori-Allan =

French operatic soprano

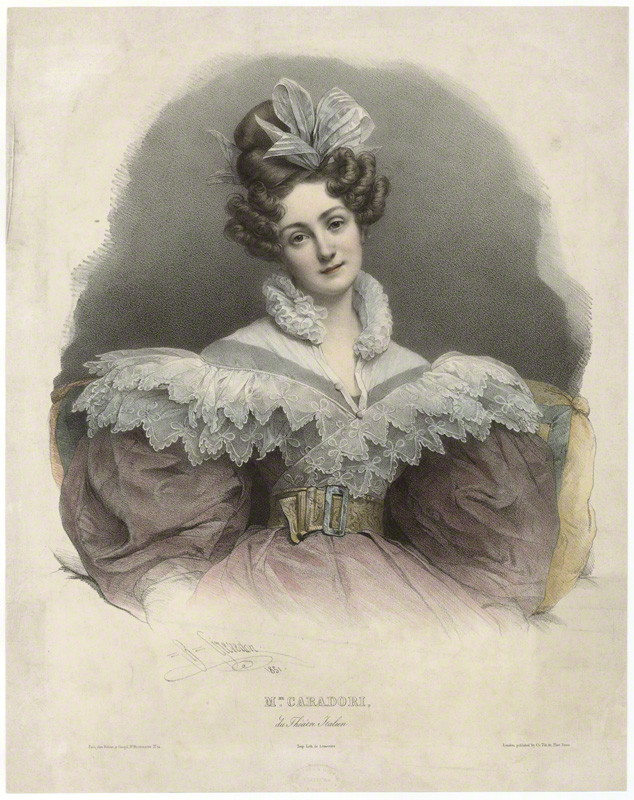
- Rosalbina Caradori-Allan by Pierre Louis ('Henri') Grevedon, 1831
- Born: Maria Caterina Rosalbina de Munck; 1800; Milan, Italy
- Died: 15 October 1865; Surbiton, England
- Occupations: Opera and concert singer (soprano)
- Years active: 1821–1845
- Children: Edward Allan (1824 -)

Maria Caterina Rosalbina Caradori-Allan (née de Munck; 1800–1865), known as Signora Rosalbina Caradori during her career, was a French operatic soprano.

== Early life ==
Caradori was born at the Casa Palatina, Milan, in 1800. Her father, Baron de Munck, was an Alsatian who served in the French army, while her mother Elizabeth Christina, whose maiden name was Caradori, was a native of either Saint Petersburg or Italy. According to the New American Cyclopedia, and Moore's Complete Encyclopaedia of Music, her father died when she was 20, leaving the family short of funds, and obliging her to employ professionally her musical talents, which had previously been under the direction of her mother, as "an elegant accomplishment". Caradori was proficient in English, French, German and Italian.

== Singing debut and first appearances ==
Caradori's debut was held at the Argyll Rooms in London on 30 July 1821. After a tour in France and part of Germany, the influence and support of Count St. Antonio resulted in her engagement at King's Theatre in London, where she made her first appearance as Cherubino in Le nozze di Figaro on 12 January 1822. The performance starred Violante Camporese as Susanna, Giuseppina Ronzi de Begnis as the Countess, Carlo Angrisani as Figaro, Giuseppe Ambrogetti as Almaviva and Placci as Bartolo.The Examiner of 20 January 1822 reviewed Caradori's performance favourably:

She appears very youthful, with a slight figure and pleasant archness of countenance that suits the character well. Her voice is like her person, slender; but has tones of extreme sweetness and expression that go at once to the heart, with a happy facility of execution that appears the result of natural rather than acquired flexibility, so completely free is it from all show of difficulty or exertion. If, as critics, we must find any fault, it is in rather a redundancy of ornament, but it is introduced in a manner so little interfering with the sentiment, and so charmingly executed, that we were more pleased with it than, as grave and judicious judges, we fear we ought to be.

Caradori's salary for this first season was £300. During this year she appeared in an unsuccessful run of Pacini's Il barone di Dolsheim (as the second heroine), and other performances including La gazza ladra (as Pippo - in which her acting skills were criticised), Rossini's Otello (as Emilia). She also sang with Giuseppina Ronzi de Begnis and Laure Cinti-Damoreau during her first season. On the 15th April 1822 Caradori performed at the Philharmonic Society, where she performed with Pierre Begrez and Bellamy. Caradori was managed by John Ebers, who leased the King's Theatre: she performed at the venue throughout the year with singers Angelica Catalani and Giuseppe Ambrogetti, and with musicians Raphael Georg Kiesewetter, Paolo Spagnoletti, and Arthur Clifton. In May 1822 Caradori performed her own concert at the King's Theatre alongside Violante Camporese and Rebecca Isaacs (who was known as 'Zuchelli').

== Early career, marriage, and motherhood ==
In 1823 Caradori was re-engaged, at a salary of £400, and appeared as Vitellia in Mozart's La clemenza di Tito (after the two preferred singers were unable to perform) and as Carlotta in Saverio Mercadante's Elisa e Claudio in April that year. She also returned to singing at the Philarmonic Society, and performed (somewhat unsuccessfully) the role of Countess d’Arco in Rossini's Matilde di Shabran. On 16 August 1823 Caradori married the secretary of the King's Theatre, Edward Thomas Allan; she was known professionally as Madame Caradori Allan from this point onward.

In 1824 Caradori-Allan returned to the King's Theatre on a salary of £500, singing with Catalani in Mayr's Nuovo latico per la Musica, Luigi Caruso's Il fanatico per la musia with Angelica Catalani, Giuseppina Rozni de Begnis and Curioni and (as a benefit for herself) as Zerlina in Don Giovanni. Caradori-Allan's performances of Don Giovanni were broken up by the birth of her son, Edward, on the 25th May; she returned to singing in August.

In 1825 Caradori-Allan's chief parts were Carlotta in Pietro Generali's L'Adelina, Fatima in Gioachino Rossini's Pietro l'Eremita, and Palmide in Giacomo Meyerbeer's Il crociato in Egitto; in the latter opera she performed with the castrato Velluti, who struggled to connect with the contemporary audience. Lord Edgecumbe noted that "her genteel and particularly modest manner, combined with a very agreeable person and countenance, render her a pleasing and interesting, though not a surprising performer." After the operatic season Caradori-Allan performed in Manchester with Maria Malibran, where reviewers praised her pronunciation of English lyrics. Subsequent performances in the Yorkshire and Derby Festivals were met with mixed opinions.

Struggling to adapt to the large spaces of opera houses which singers such as Guidetta Pasta and Maria Malibran were successful in, Caradori-Allan switched to singing in concert rooms instead and built a career there performing oratorio music.

In 1826 Caradori-Allan's salary, which had been lowered to £400, was raised to £700. Her first performance of the year (again at the King's Theatre, under John Ebers) was as Elena in Rossini's La donna del lago, alongside Alberico Curioni, Torri, and Cornega. She sang with Giuditta Pasta in Zingarelli's Giulietta e Romeo, and as Rosina in Il Barbiere di Seviglia. Pasta in Zingarelli's Giulietta e Romeo, and as Rosina in Il Barbiere di Seviglia. Caradori-Allan also performed as Susanna in Mozart's Le nozze di Figaro, Fatima in Pietro l’eremita, and in Mayer’s Medea in Corinto, making it - as historian Kurt Ganzl noted - Caradori-Allan's "most successful season to date." After the operatic season Caradori-Allan worked the concert circuit, including performing at the Philharmonic Society's Concert of Ancient Music for the first time; she would continue to sing at this event for the next 20 years. Caradori-Allan's performances at the Gloucester Musical Festival and the Birmingham Festival also received positive reviews in this season.

In 1827 Caradori-Allan's salary rose to £1,200: this was supported by Ebers giving her the key role of Giulia in Spontini’s La vestale. However this was the last season of Italian opera in England for some time. After that, Caradori-Allan went to the continent.

She sang in Venice in 1830, where she created the role of Giulietta in Bellini's I Capuleti e i Montecchi, but in 1834 re-appeared in Italian opera in London, and after 1835 remained mainly in England until her death.

Caradori-Allan sang the soprano solo at the British première of Beethoven's Symphony No. 9 on 21 March 1825 and in the same year took part in performances in York and Gloucester. In 1827 she performed at the Leicester and Worcester festivals. In 1834 she sang in the Handel festival in Westminster Abbey, and in 1836 performed at the Winchester festival with Maria Malibran. During the Winchester performance Malibran collapsed and died nine days later. In 1846 Caradori-Allan took part in Felix Mendelssohn's Elijah at a production given at the Birmingham Festival; it is this performance, along with her 1825 premiere of Beethoven's Symphony No.9, for which she is primarily remembered.

In the final phase of her career, Caradori-Allan abandoned the stage for oratorio and concert singing. In 1840 she undertook a successful concert tour in the United States. She was a regular performer at the Concerts of Antient Music, and did some teaching. Caradori-Allan also composed musical works. The Daily News of 12 July 1847 reviewed her compositions favourably:

...several new Italian airs and duets have appeared from the pen of Madame Caradori Allan, a lady long distinguished for her pure and graceful style in this species of composition. There are two duets, "Le Due Rose", and Il Canto del Trovadore", both for ladies’ voices [Good review follows, praising her harmonic competence]. But our favourite among these songs is "Il sospiro": it is quite a little gem, full of fanciful tenderness, and original and imaginative in every bar.

Her mother, Elizabeth de Munck (née Caradori), died in London in 1841, aged 79. She was buried in Highgate Cemetery. Her grave monument has a relief carving of a pelican illustrating the legend that a mother pelican would sacrifice herself in times of need by pecking her breast and letting her chicks drink her blood. Beneath this are the words, “Ici repose ma meillure amie, ma mère”.

Caradori-Allan retired in 1848 following the end of season Concert of Ancient Music on 14 June, although she put in one final appearance on the platform, for the Crystal Palace concert which opened The Great Exhibition on 1 May 1851. She died at Elm Lodge, Surbiton, on 15 October 1865.

== Legacy ==
Throughout her life, Caradori-Allan enjoyed popularity. Musically, she was accomplished, being a sight reader and a composer of songs for solo and ensemble voices. Her singing was remarkable for finish than for force; her voice was characterized as pure, sweet, clear, silvery, and flexible. However, it was said of her that "she always delighted, but never surprised" her audiences. As an actress she was charming.
