= Il matrimonio segreto =

Opera by Domenico Cimarosa

- Opera by Domenico Cimarosa
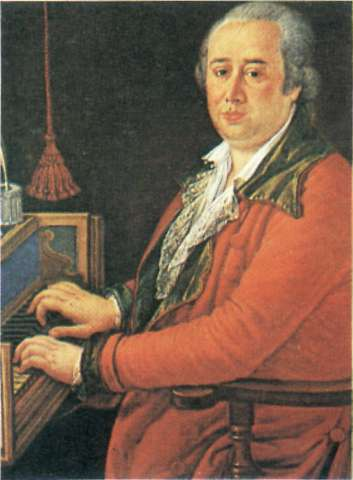
- The composer
- Translation: The Secret Marriage
- Librettist: Giovanni Bertati
- Language: Italian
- Based on: The Clandestine Marriage by George Colman the Elder and David Garrick
- Premiere: 7 February 1792; Imperial Hofburg Theatre in Vienna

Il matrimonio segreto (The Secret Marriage) is a dramma giocoso in two acts, music by Domenico Cimarosa, on a libretto by Giovanni Bertati, based on the 1766 play The Clandestine Marriage by George Colman the Elder and David Garrick. It was first performed on 7 February 1792 at the Imperial Hofburg Theatre in Vienna in the presence of Emperor Leopold II.

== Performance history ==
Cimarosa's only work still to be regularly performed, it is arguably one of the greatest 18th century opera buffa apart from those by Mozart. Its premiere was the occasion of the longest encore in operatic history; Leopold II was so delighted that he ordered supper served to the company and the entire opera repeated immediately after without the orchestra, with the composer accompanying on the harpsichord.

The Italian premiere of the opera was given at La Scala in Milan on 17 February 1793 with Maria Gazzotti as Carolina and Vincenzo Del Moro as Paolino. On 23 May, the same year, it arrived at the Teatre de la Santa Creu in Barcelona. England saw the work for the first time on 11 January 1794 at The King's Theatre in London and the following 6 August it was performed for the first time in Portugal at the Teatro Nacional de São Carlos in Lisbon with Domenico Caporalini as Carolina and Luigi Bruschi as Paolino. The French premiere was given by the Théâtre-Italien in Paris on 10 May 1801 with Teresa Strinasacchi Avogadro as Carolina and Gustavo Lazzarini as Paolino.

Il matrimonio segreto was first performed in the United States at the Italian Opera House in New York City on 8 January 1834. The Metropolitan Opera presented the work for the first time on 25 February 1937 with Muriel Dickson as Carolina, George Rasely as Paolino, Natalie Bodanya as Elisetta, Julius Huehn as Robinson, and Ettore Panizza conducting.

== Roles ==
Roles, voice types, premiere cast
Role	Voice type	Premiere cast, 7 February 1792 Conductor: Domenico Cimarosa
Carolina	soprano	Irene Tomeoni
Elisetta	soprano or mezzo-soprano	Giuseppina Nettelet
Fidalma	mezzo-soprano	Dorothea Bussani
Paolino	tenor	Santi Nencini
Geronimo	bass	Giambattista Serafino Blasi
Count Robinson	bass	Francesco Benucci

== Synopsis ==
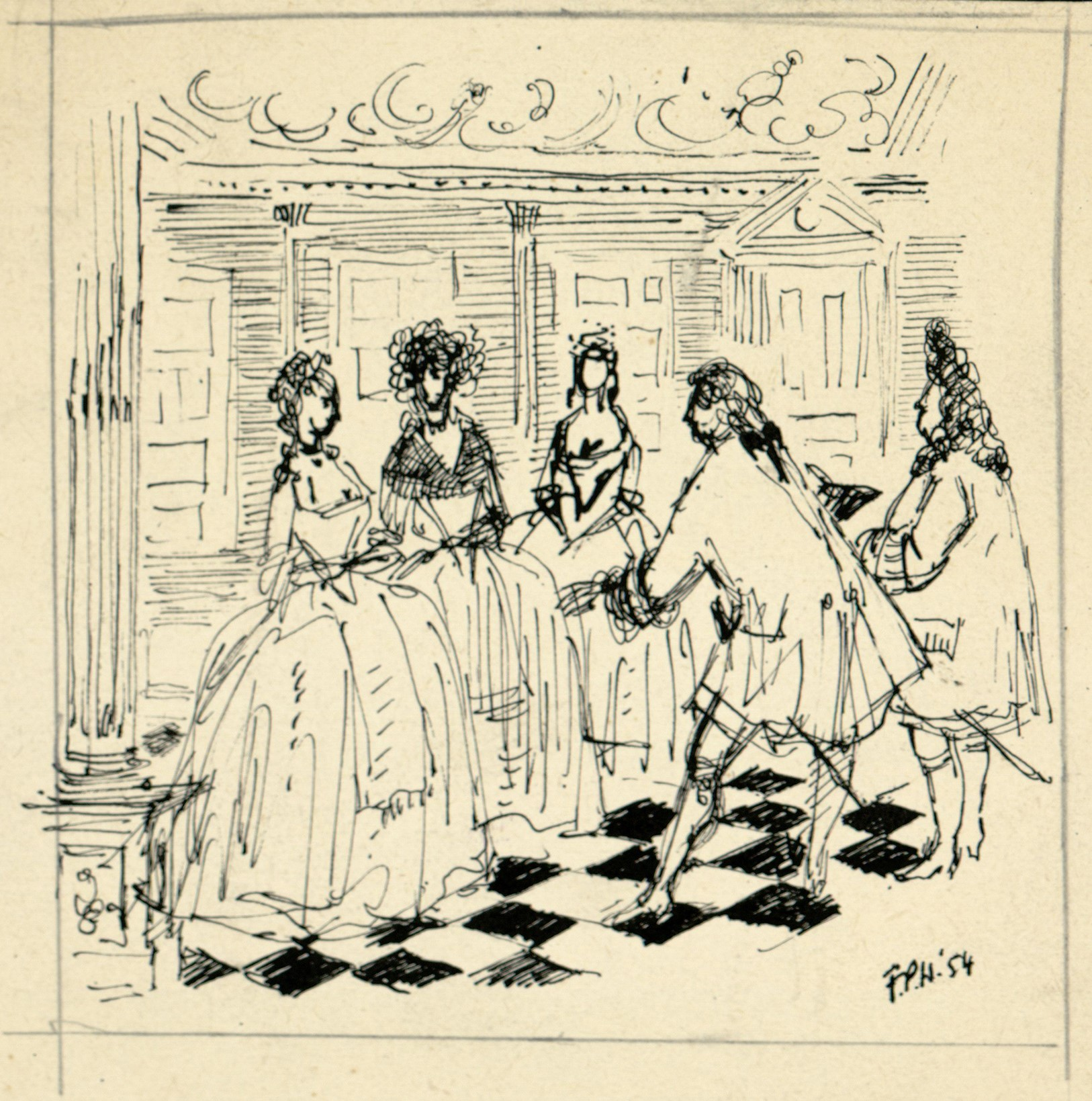
Design for libretto cover, 1954

We are in the household of Geronimo, a wealthy citizen of Bologna; he has two daughters, Elisetta and Carolina, and a sister Fidalma, who runs the household. He also has a young secretary, Paolino, who is secretly married to the younger daughter, Carolina. The time is the early eighteenth century.

=== Act 1 ===
Paolino is working to arrange a marriage contract between Elisetta and his patron, Count Robinson, hoping that as soon as Geronimo's older daughter is well married, his marriage to the younger one will be acceptable. Count Robinson has written a letter expressing interest – tempted by Elisetta's substantial dowry – and Geronimo is thrilled to think that his daughter will be a Countess ("Udite, tutti udite"). Fidalma confesses to her niece that she is in love, too, but only reveals in an aside to the audience that she has her eye on Paolino ("È vero che in casa").

When the Count arrives he is disappointed to find that it is not Carolina who has been offered to him ("Senza tante cerimonie"). He tells Paolino that he will be content with a smaller dowry and sends him off to arrange the match. Carolina does not dare tell the count that she is married, so when she admits she has no lover it excites him further; she tries to convince him she has no desire or qualification to be a countess ("Perdonate, signor mio"), but he continues to pursue her. Elisetta accuses them both of betraying her, and the commotion attracts Fidalma who joins Carolina in trying to calm Elisetta ("Lasciatemi, signore"); everyone tries at once to explain his or her feelings to the confused and exasperated Geronimo ("Orsù, saper conviene").

=== Act 2 ===
Geronimo insists that the Count must honor his contract and marry Elisetta, but the Count refuses. When he offers to accept a smaller dowry with Carolina's hand instead, Geronimo is delighted to save face and money – as long as Elisetta agrees.

Paolino is distraught, and throws himself on Fidalma's mercy, but is stunned to find that she hopes to marry him; he faints, giving her the idea that she returns his emotion and making Carolina think she has been betrayed, but he promises that they will leave the house at dawn and take refuge in the house of a relative.

The Count tells Elisetta all his bad habits and physical defects, hoping she would reject him, but she stands firm – and he finally confesses that he cannot abide her. Geronimo can not persuade her either. Fidalma suggests sending Carolina to a convent, and Geronimo agrees. Carolina is broken-hearted and tries to confess her predicament to the Count, but they are interrupted by her sister, her aunt and her father who are gleeful at having caught them together, and Geronimo sends Paolino off with a letter to the Mother Superior.

After a brilliant and farcical finale Paolino and Carolina finally confess they have been married for two months; Geronimo and Fidalma are furious, but the Count and Elisetta advise them to forgive the newlyweds, adding that they (the Count and Elisetta) will marry after all.

== Recordings ==
- 1951: Alda Noni, Ornella Rovere, Giulietta Simionato, Cesare Valletti, Sesto Bruscantini, Antonio Cassinelli – Orchestra del Maggio Musicale Fiorentino, Manno Wolf-Ferrari – (Warner Fonit)
- 1956: Graziella Sciutti, Eugenia Ratti, Ebe Stignani, Luigi Alva, Franco Calabrese – Orchestra del Teatro alla Scala, Nino Sanzogno – (EMI)
- 1978: Arleen Auger, Júlia Várady, Julia Hamari, Ryland Davies, Dietrich Fischer-Dieskau, Alberto Rinaldi – English Chamber Orchestra, Daniel Barenboim – (Deutsche Grammophon)
- 1991: Susan Patterson, Janet Williams, Gloria Banditelli, William Matteuzzi, Petteri Salomaa, Alfonso Antoniozzi, Orchestra of the Eastern Netherlands, Gabrielle Bellini – (Arts Music)
- 1992: Elżbieta Szmytka, Jeannette Fischer, Anne-Marie Owens, Tracey Welborn, François Le Roux, Angelo Romero, Orchestre de Chambre de Lausanne, Jesús López-Cobos – (Cascavelle)
- 2008: Cinzia Forte, Priscille Laplace, Damiana Pinti, Alberto Rinaldi, Aldo Caputo – Orchestra & Chorus of the Opéra Royal de Wallonie, Giovanni Antonini – (Dynamic)
- 2021: Renato Girolami, Donato Di Stefano, Loriana Castellano, Klara Ek, Giulia Semenzato, Jesús Álverez, Orchester der Academia Montis Regalis, Alessandro De Marchi – (cpo)
