= Giuseppe Ambrogetti =

Italian opera singer

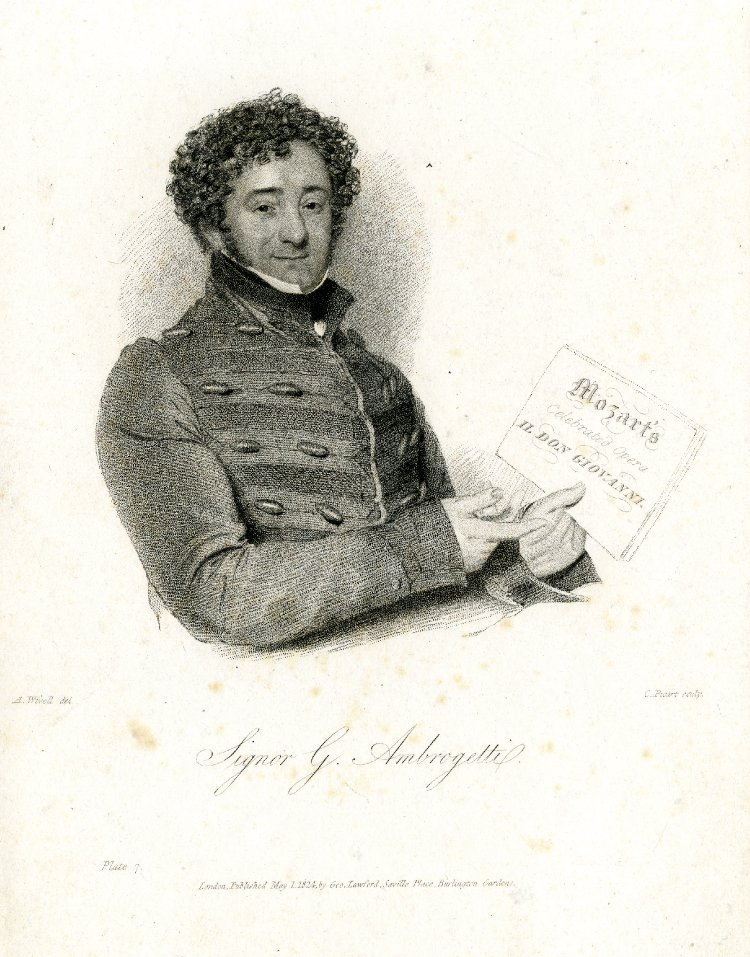
Portrait of Giuseppe Ambrogetti, holding Mozart's score to Don Giovanni. Print by Charles Picart after Abraham Wivell

Giuseppe Ambrogetti (1780 – after 1838) was an Italian opera singer of the type basso buffo.

He was an excellent buffo. His first performance was in 1807; his debut in Paris was in 1815 in Don Giovanni. He debuted at the opera in London in 1817, where he was very successful. His voice was a bass of no great power, but he was an excellent actor, with a natural vein of humour, though often put into characters unsuited to him as a singer. Yet he acted extremely well, and in a manner too horribly true to nature, the part of the mad father in Ferdinando Paer's opera Agnese (opera), while the part of the daughter was sung by Violante Camporesi. He remained until the end of the season of 1821, in which his salary was £400. He married the singer Teresa Strinasacchi. The date of his death is not known. He was said to have become a monk in France; but in 1838 he was in Ireland, after which nothing was heard of him.
