= Annamary Dickey =

American soprano and actress

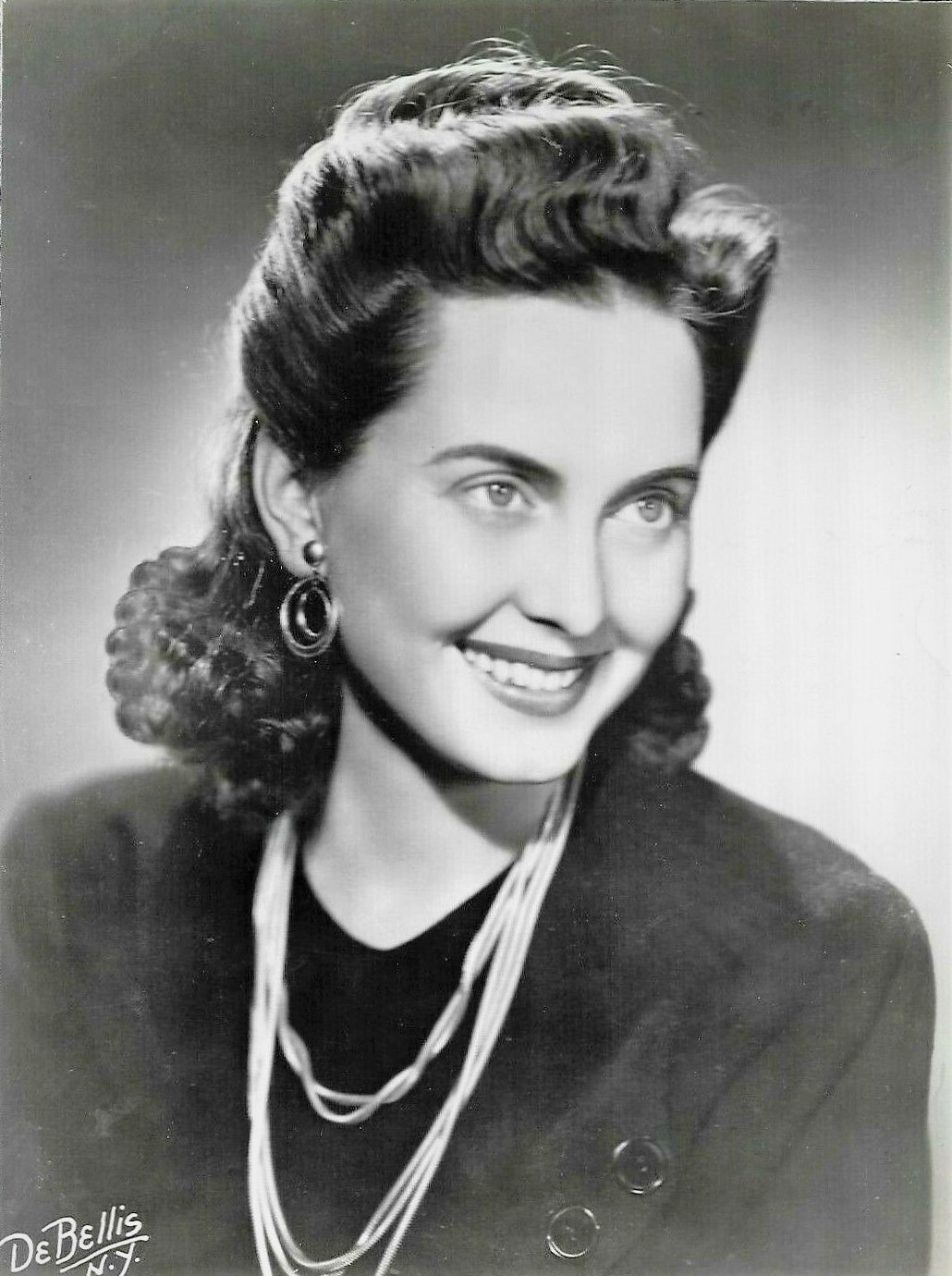
Dickey in a 1944 press photograph

Annamary Dickey (April 9, 1911 – June 1, 1999), also known as Annamary Dickey Laue, was an American soprano and actress in operas, operettas, musicals, night clubs, and concerts who had an active performance career from the 1930s through the 1960s. She began her career as a regular performer with the Chautauqua Opera and the St. Louis Municipal Opera in the mid to late 1930s. In 1939 she won the Metropolitan Opera Auditions of the Air which earned her a contract with the Metropolitan Opera (Met). She was a soprano in mainly secondary roles at the Met from 1939 to 1944; appearing in productions of Gluck's Orfeo ed Euridice, Massenet's Manon, Delibes' Lakmé, Charpentier's Louise, Bizet's Carmen, Der Rosenkavalier by Richard Strauss, Mozart's The Marriage of Figaro, and Smetana's The Bartered Bride. Her most significant role at the Met was as Musetta in Puccini's La bohème. A strikingly beautiful woman with a passion for fashionable clothes, she gained the moniker the "Glamour Girl of the 'Met'" and headlined a fashion campaign for Saks Fifth Avenue in 1945.

While working at the Met, Dickey became the headline night club singer at the Wedgewood Room of the prestigious Waldorf-Astoria Hotel from 1943 to 1946, singing a mix of popular songs and classical works. She also had engagements singing at the Terrace Room in The Statler Hilton in Boston and the Empress Club in London. After leaving the Met, her work shifted predominantly towards musical theatre, becoming a leading lady on Broadway from 1944 to 1954. She created roles in the original productions of Kreisler's Rhapsody (1944, as Empress Maria Theresa), George S. Kaufman's Hollywood Pinafore (1945, Brenda Blossom), and Rodgers and Hammerstein's Allegro (1947, Marjorie Taylor); the latter of which was the pinnacle of her career. She also portrayed Marjorie Taylor in the work's first national tour in the late 1940s.

Dickey's association with Rodgers and Hammerstein continued to grow after Allegro ended. She starred in annual summer concerts of the duo's music with the New York Philharmonic at Lewisohn Stadium from 1948 to 1957. She also portrayed Anna Leonowens in the original Broadway run of The King and I, initially serving as the standby actress for Constance Carpenter. She stepped in on several occasions for Carpenter, including two weeks while the actress was visiting family in England. She later took over the role after Carpenter left the show in January 1954, and was succeeded by Patricia Morison in March 1954.

In addition to her performances on stage, Dickey was a regular presence on radio in the 1930s and 1940s. She was co-host of the Texaco Star Theater with James Melton from 1945 to 1947. She also made numerous appearances on variety programs on American television. After her husband died in 1966, she took a position as head of the opera program at the University of South Florida in Tampa. Upon her retirement from the faculty of USF in 1988 she was honored with the title of professor emeritus. She died in 1999 at the age of 88.

== Early life and education ==
Born in Decatur, Illinois, Dickey was the daughter of Dr. James Harvey Dickey, a dentist, and his wife, Rebecca McAdams. She graduated from Stephen Decatur High School in 1928, after which she pursued music studies at Millikin University from which she graduated in 1932. While at Millikin, she won third place in the Chicagoland Music Festival's singing competition in 1930, which was held at Soldier Field. This led to a short-term contract performing on radio programs in Chicago. From 1933 to 1937 she studied opera at the Juilliard School with Florence Kimball. She gave her graduate studies recital in the recital hall at the Barbizon Hotel on January 12, 1936.

Dickey appeared in several operas with the Juilliard Opera Theatre (JOT), beginning with the mezzo-soprano role of La Ciesca in Giacomo Puccini's Gianni Schicchi in 1933. In the same class as mezzo Risë Stevens, she portrayed the lead soprano roles of Amore to Stevens's Orfeo in Gluck's Orfeo ed Euridice, and Pamina to Stevens's Pappagena in Mozart's The Magic Flute in 1935. Other opera roles she performed with the JOT included Mistress Ford in Otto Nicolai's The Merry Wives of Windsor (1936); Kitty in the United States premiere of Albert Stoessel's Garrick (1937); and Angelica in the United States premiere of Ralph Vaughan Williams's The Poisoned Kiss (1937). Dickey went with the Juilliard School production of Garrick to the Worcester Music Festival, Massachusetts, where Stoessel conducted performances of his opera at Mechanics Hall.

While at Juilliard, Dickey spent her summers studying opera with Marcella Sembrich at her teaching studio in Bolton Landing, Warren County, New York, near Lake George, and as a member of the Chautauqua Institution a prestigious summer training ground for young opera singers. With the Chautauqua Opera she performed the roles of Elsie Maynard in Gilbert and Sullivan's The Yeomen of the Guard and Lady Marian in Reginald De Koven's Robin Hood in 1935; and the title role in Michael William Balfe's The Bohemian Girl in 1936.

== Early career in Saint Louis and on Broadway ==
In 1937, Dickey became a contracted member of the St. Louis Municipal Opera (SLMO); beginning her professional career performing in operas, operettas, and musicals with the company. She made her professional debut in July 1937 with the SLMO in the world premiere of Frederick Loewe and Earle Crooker's 1937 musical, Salute to Spring, at The MUNY in the supporting role of Splaster with Bernice Claire starring. The following summer she appeared in the world premiere of Jerome Kern and Oscar Hammerstein II's operetta Gentleman Unafraid. Other works she performed in with the SLMO included De Koven's Robin Hood (1937); the world premiere of Bruno Hardt-Warden's Wild Violets (1937, as Mitzi); Bedřich Smetana's The Bartered Bride (1939, as Esmerelda); and Victor Herbert's Babette (1939, as Vinetta). In 1937, she also performed as a regular on the 'Evening Serenade' program for KMOX radio in Saint Louis.

In 1938, Dickey starred in Glendon Allvine's Knights of Song, a stage work which told the story of Gilbert and Sullivan. The work included several scenes and excerpts from the operettas of the famous pair and Dickey was featured heavily in those scenes. Among the parts she portrayed in the show were, Edith from The Pirates of Penzance and Pitti-Sing from The Mikado among others. She performed in the world premiere of the work at the SLMO in August 1938, and then continued with the production when it transferred to Broadway on October 17, 1938; an occasion which marked her Broadway debut. The production was produced by Laurence Schwab and directed by Hammerstein. In 1939, she returned to Broadway in the role of the Nurse in Arnold Sundgaard's Everywhere I Roam.

== Singing at the Met and work during World War II ==
In 1939, Dickey won the Metropolitan Opera Auditions of the Air which earned her a contract with the Metropolitan Opera. This win also led to an invitation to perform songs at the Central Park Mall in June 1939 for a "New Citizens Day" event, attended by more than 5,000 people, which also featured comedian and singer Eddie Cantor and a speech by Justice John C. Knox. She made her debut at the Met as the Happy Shade in Gluck's Orfeo ed Euridice on November 29, 1939, with Kerstin Thorborg as Orfeo, Irene Jessner as Euridice, and Herbert Graf conducting. She performed the role again with the Met on tour to the Academy of Music in Philadelphia the following month.

Dickey continued to sing at the Met annually through 1944, where her most significant role was Musetta in Giacomo Puccini's La bohème (1940–1944). Other roles she performed on the Met stage included Poussette in Jules Massenet's Manon (1939–1941, with Bidu Sayão); Ellen in Léo Delibes's Lakmé (1940, with Lily Pons); the Newsgirl in Gustave Charpentier's Louise (1940–1941, with Grace Moore); Frasquita in Georges Bizet's Carmen (1942, 1944); the Milliner in Richard Strauss's Der Rosenkavalier (1940–1942); Barbarina in Wolfgang Amadeus Mozart's The Marriage of Figaro (1941, 1943); and Esmeralda in The Bartered Bride (1942). Her 91st and final performance at the Met was as Musetta on April 7, 1944, with Licia Albanese as Mimì, Armand Tokatyan as Rodolfo, and John Brownlee as her Marcello with Cesare Sodero conducting.

As part of her work for the Metropolitan Opera, Dickey was often utilized for publicity or charity events on radio, television, and in the community. A strikingly beautiful woman with a taste for fashionable clothes, she earned the moniker the "Glamour Girl of the Met". This public image earned her a contract leading a fashion sales campaign at Saks Fifth Avenue in 1945. She made several appearances on television including a featured role in the variety broadcast "Milestone in Television" for NBC in 1940 singing opera with Leonard Warren. In 1943 and 1944, she performed in several "camp shows" for the United Service Organizations (USO) with the Met during World War II. These camp shows brought opera performances to the military camps of the United States Armed Forces on United States soil as a means of entertaining troops on active duty. She also traveled with the USO to Australia in 1943 to perform for US and Australian troops serving in the Pacific front of the war. In the summer of 1944 she was committed to performing on cruise ships with Helen Hayes and Bert Lytell for the United States government, as means of encouraging the sale of War bonds to raise capital for the military.

While working at the Met, Dickey became the headline night club singer at the Wedgewood Room of the prestigious Waldorf-Astoria Hotel from 1943 to 1946, singing a mix of popular songs and classical works. She also had engagements singing at the Terrace Room in The Statler Hilton in Boston in 1946. She also starred in operas with Giorgio D'Andria's touring National Opera Company in the early 1940s, notably portraying Violetta in Giuseppe Verdi's La traviata at the Brooklyn Academy of Music in 1942 among other theaters.

== Broadway and other work ==
After leaving the Met, Dickey's work shifted predominantly towards musical theatre, radio, and concert work. In 1945, she was signed to a three-year contract co-hosting the radio program Texaco Star Theater with James Melton. She was also a recurring guest on The Celanese Hour on Chicago radio and the Cities Service Band of America concert series. She became a leading lady on Broadway from 1944 to 1954. She starred as Empress Maria Theresa in Fritz Kreisler's Rhapsody at the New Century Theatre in 1944. This was followed by the role of Brenda Blossom in another Gilbert and Sullivan musical adaptation, Hollywood Pinafore by George S. Kaufman, which premiered at Ford's Grand Opera House in May 1945 before transferring to the Alvin Theatre on Broadway the following June. In 1946, she starred in the variety show The Postman Always Rings Twice with Guy Lombardo and his orchestra at the Capitol Theatre.

Dickey had the biggest success of her career when she originated the role of Marjorie Taylor in Rodgers and Hammerstein's Allegro at the Majestic Theatre on October 10, 1947. She had performed the role the September prior in out-of-town try-outs in New Hampshire. She remained with the production until it closed after 315 performances on July 10, 1948, and then continued to perform the role in the first national tour of the musical in 1948–1949. She recorded the role for the original Broadway cast album in 1947.

Dickey left the National tour of Allegro following the production's stay in Los Angeles in February 1949; citing the desire to return home to her family. She had married the New York businessman Arthur E. Laue in Richmond, Virginia, on April 6, 1940; and they had recently had a daughter in June 1947, just three months before Allegro had opened on Broadway. After this decision, Dickey continued her association with Rodgers and Hammerstein through appearing in their annual summer concerts with the New York Philharmonic at Lewisohn Stadium from 1948 to 1957 singing works from the shows Carousel, Oklahoma!, South Pacific, Allegro, and The King and I with crowds as large as 20,000 in attendance. She also performed in a special concert of Rodgers and Hammerstein's music at Drury University in 1949, when the two men were honored with honorary doctorates in music from that institution; and starred in a concert of their music at Carnegie Hall with the New York Philharmonic in 1954. She also was a soloist in a concert of their music with the Los Angeles Philharmonic at the Hollywood Bowl in July 1954 with Richard Rodgers conducting.

On April 19, 1946, Dickey sang "The Star-Spangled Banner" for the opening game of the 1946 New York Yankees season; an occasion which marked the premiere of the newly renovated Yankee Stadium which had added several thousands of box seats. In 1949, she returned to the St. Louis Municipal Opera to perform the role of Nadina in Oscar Straus's The Chocolate Soldier. In 1950, she starred in the title role of Harry Tierney Rio Rita at the Bucks County Playhouse with David Atkinson as Captain Jim Stewart. That same year she starred in the NBC television variety program Ford Star Review with comedian George DeWitt. She returned to performing in night clubs, with engagements at the Flame Room of the Hotel Radisson Minneapolis in 1950 and the Cotillion Room of The Pierre hotel in 1951. In 1951, she headlined at the Empress Club in London. She also starred in a 1951 variety show at the Roxy Theatre with ventriloquist Jimmy Nelson.

In September 1952 Dickey was engaged as the standby actress for Constance Carpenter as Anna Leonowens in the original Broadway production of Rodgers and Hammerstein's The King and I after the death of Gertrude Lawrence. She performed the role for two weeks in August 1953 while Carpenter was on vacation in England. She took over the role when Carpenter left the show in January 1954, and continued in the part until Patricia Morison succeeded her in March 1954. She continued to portray the role of Leonowens frequently in regional theatres, starring in productions in Atlanta (1956), Louisville (1956), Chicago (1956), and the Berkshire Theatre Festival (1962).

In 1959, she starred as Louisa Giovanni in Robert Wright and George Forrest's Song of Norway at The Little Theatre on the Square. She returned there in 1961 to star in Take Me Along.

== Later life ==
In 1966, Dickey's husband, Arthur E. Laue, who was president of a furnishings company in New York, died suddenly of heart failure. After this she devoted her time to teaching singing. She took a position as head of the opera program at the University of South Florida in Tampa in 1967. Upon her retirement from the faculty of USF in 1988, she was honored with the title of professor emeritus. She died in 1999 at the age of 88 in Tampa, Florida.
