= John Van Dyke =

John Van Dyke or John van Dyke may refer to:

- John Van Dyke (politician) (1807–1878), American politician
- John Charles Van Dyke (1856–1932), American art historian and critic
- John Wesley Van Dyke (1849–1939), president of the Atlantic Refining Company, Philadelphia
- John van Dyke (canoeist) (1935–2021), American canoeist
