= Edna de Lima =

American soprano (1879–1968)

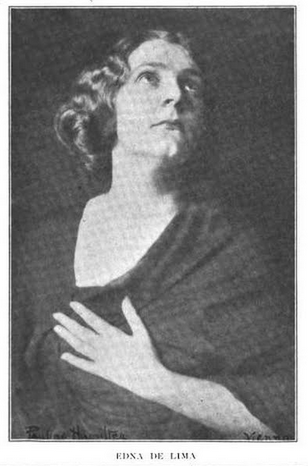
- Born: Edna Burton; July 15, 1879; Lima, Ohio, United States
- Died: April 23, 1968 (aged 88); Stonington, Connecticut, United States
- Other name: Edna Burton Van Dyke
- Occupations: Soprano singer and Translator
- Years active: 1910–1918
- Spouse: John Dyke (m. 1908; died 1939)

Edna de Lima (born Edna Burton; 15 July 1879 – 23 April 1968), later known as Edna Burton Van Dyke, was an American lyric soprano singer and translator.

== Early life ==
Edna O. Burton was from Lima, Ohio, the daughter of Dr. Enos G. Burton and Emma Jane Brown Burton. She took her professional name from her hometown. She studied voice in Paris with Marcella Sembrich and Jean de Reszke.

== Career ==
=== Abroad ===
In 1910, Edna de Lima appeared in the operas Louise, Gli Ugonotti, Faust and La bohème at the Royal Opera House in Covent Garden in London. Edna de Lima debuted at the Imperial Opera House in Vienna on 24 January 1911 in a tiny role in Meyerbeers Le prophète. After this first performance she returned to Vienna in October of the same year, as a member of the ensemble. She performed in small and large roles across the repertoire of the Imperial Opera House. Six times she sang Mimì in La bohème, four times Micaëla in Carmen, seven times Barbarina in Le nozze di Figaro, once Urbain in Les Huguenots and twenty times Lola in Cavalleria rusticana. The rest were mainly smaller roles like Wellgunde in Der Ring des Nibelungen or one of the flowermaidens in Parsifal, her last performance in Vienna on 22 June 1914. She sang a role in Faust again in London in 1923. In 1925, she traveled to South Africa for a performing tour.

=== In the United States ===
Edna de Lima first sang at New York's Aeolian Hall in 1916. She made her Chicago concert debut in 1917, when a reviewer declared that "Nature has been bounteous to Mme. de Lima in the bestowal of personal attractiveness and grace of manner in addition to the crystalline purity of her voice." She was billed as "formerly of the Vienna Opera" when she appeared at the Stadium Concerts in New York in the summer of 1918. She performed on a bill with pianist Winifred Byrd, tenor Dan Beddoe, and violinist Michel Gusikoff, for the Globe Music Club later in 1918. She translated lyrics for recitalists, including Margaret Matzenauer. During World War I, she sang at concerts for the Liberty Bond Campaign, and for the Red Cross.

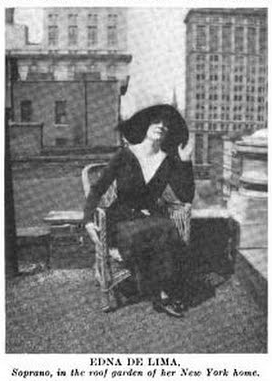
Edna de Lima, from a 1918 publication

== Personal life ==
Edna Burton married John Wesley Van Dyke, an oil company executive, in Paris in 1908, on the condition that she be allowed to continue her singing career, because "the divine fire of music was in her blood and in her brain". She was not mentioned in Van Dyke's obituary in 1939. However, "Mrs. Edna Van Dyke" was mentioned as still alive and living in New York City in her sister Elma Burton Baxter's obituary in 1960.
