= Frances Robinson-Duff =

American actress (1878–1951)

Frances Robinson-Duff (1878-1951) was an American actress and voice teacher known as "the foremost dramatic coach in America" in the first half of the 20th century.

Robinson-Duff was born in Bangor, Maine, to British mining engineer Colonel Charles Duff and his wife Sarah Robinson, a native of Bangor who, after the couple separated, moved to Chicago and later to Paris, becoming a noted opera singer and singing teacher under the name Sarah Robinson-Duff; her first pupil was future opera star Mary Garden.

From an early age, Robinson-Duff wanted to teach dramatic arts, but her mother insisted that she first gain experience in the craft of acting. After being instructed in the Delsarte system by a drama teacher in Chicago, Robinson-Duff was invited to join the touring company of famed Shakespearean actress Julia Marlowe. In 1898 she made her Broadway debut with Miss Marlowe at the Knickerbocker Theatre in New York, and subsequently appeared in numerous productions in New York and London.

After eleven years of acting, she joined her mother in Paris, where they enjoyed the company of performers and composers such as Enrico Caruso, Sarah Bernhardt and Camille Saint-Saëns. One of her mother's pupils in Paris was Florence Kimball, who became a celebrated voice teacher at the Juilliard School for 45 years, and was in turn the teacher of Leontyne Price. Frances began her teaching career in Paris, and during World War I, she volunteered her services to teach wounded soldiers how to regain the use of damaged lungs.

Shortly after the end of the war, mother and daughter moved to New York City, where Robinson-Duff established herself as a leading voice teacher, whose many famous pupils included Vivian Nathan, Mary McCormic, Dorothy Gish, Helen Hayes, Kenneth MacKenna, Catherine Calvert, Ina Claire, Miriam Hopkins, Ruth Chatterton, Mary Pickford, Clark Gable, Norma Shearer, and Katharine Hepburn.

The Robinson-Duff approach to voice training involved elaborate vocal and breathing exercises focused on the use of the diaphragm, a method humorously recounted by Hepburn (who never mastered it) in her autobiography, Me: Stories of My Life (1991).
