= Rosemarie Brancato =

American soprano

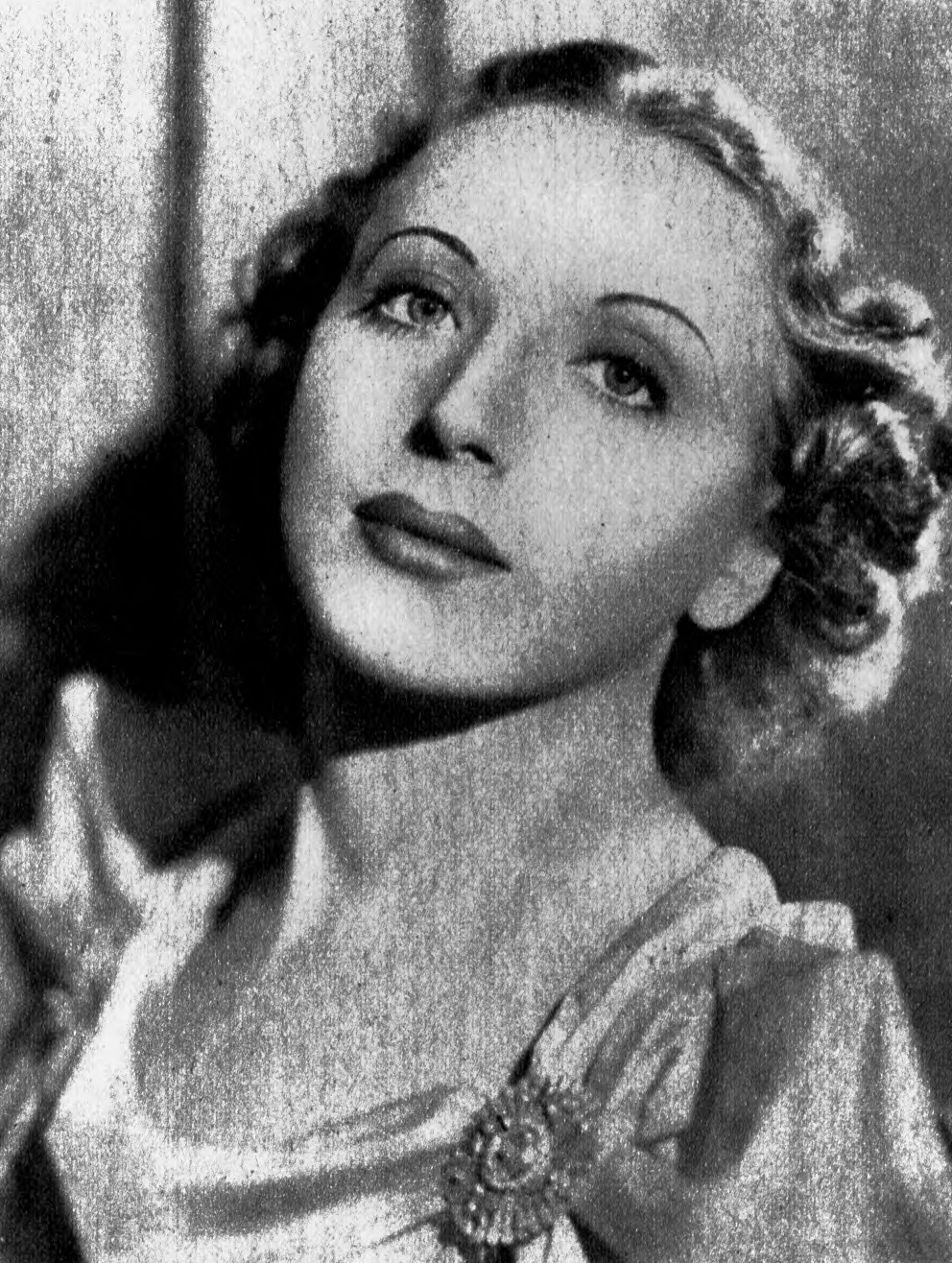
Brancato c. 1937

Rosemarie Brancato (October 2, 1910 – June 18, 1994) was an American coloratura soprano who had an active performance career in operas, operettas, and concerts on the American stage and on American radio from the mid-1930s into the 1950s. She created the role of Madame Boticini in the original Broadway production of Fritz Kreisler's Rhapsody in 1944.

== Life and career ==
Born in Kansas City, Missouri, Brancato was the daughter of Maddalena Brancato who was an obstetrician. She trained at the Eastman School of Music in Rochester, New York. Her voice teacher at Eastman was the Irish bass and composer Thomas Austin-Ball (1872-1944). While a student, she was a winner of the Northeastern regional level of the Atwater Kent Foundation's National Radio Audition in 1930; a national singing contest which awarded radio contracts as well as prize money. After graduating, she pursued further vocal studies with Estelle Liebling, the teacher of Beverly Sills, in New York City.

Brancato made her professional debut with the Chicago Civic Opera in 1934 as Gilda in Giuseppe Verdi's Rigoletto; being offered the role just a day prior after Marion Talley walked out of the production. The audience responded enthusiastically to her debut, and gave her an ovation that lasted four minutes. That same year she gave a concert of opera arias at the New York Hippodrome with the Cosmopolitan Opera Association, and began performing on WDAF radio in Kansas City. In 1936 she was signed with the Columbia Concerts Corporation who booked her in national concert tours in venues throughout the United States during the mid to late 1930s. She was heard regularly on CBS Radio in the late 1930s and 1940s.

In 1944 Brancato portrayed Madame Boticini in the original Broadway production of Fritz Kreisler's Rhapsody at the New Century Theatre. In 1946 she made her debut with the New York City Opera as Violetta in Verdi's La traviata. She sang leading roles with the Detroit Civic Light Opera and the Cincinnati Opera. In the early 1950s she starred in several operettas at the Paper Mill Playhouse, including the roles of Marianne Beaunoir in Sigmund Romberg's The New Moon (1950); Nina Hagerup in Robert Wright and George Forrest's Song of Norway (1951); and Yum-Yum in Gilbert and Sullivan's The Mikado (1953). In 1952 she performed the role of Sybil in Rudolf Friml's The Firefly with ballerina Patricia Bowman as her castmate at the Pittsburgh Civic Light Opera (PCLO). In 1953 she returned to the PCLO in the title role of Victor Herbert's Naughty Marietta with tenor Brian Sullivan as her romantic interest in 1953.

Brancato died of cancer at Beth Israel Hospital in New York City at the age of 83. She was married to Dr. Lester D. Rothman, and off stage was known as Rosemarie Rothman.
