= Rhapsody (operetta) =

Rhapsody is an operetta in 2 Acts by Fritz Kreisler (music) and John La Touche (lyrics) with a book by Arnold Sundgaard and Leonard Louis Levinson that is based on an original story by A. N. Nagler. The music from the operetta is taken mainly from Kreisler's 1932 Austrian-language operetta Sissy and from his large collection of works for violin and piano; with only a relatively small portion of new music by Kreisler being added to the operetta's score. While La Touche was the primary lyricist, playwright Blevins Davis and American composer Robert Russell Bennett also contributed some lyrics. Additionally, Davis was the operetta's producer (along with the New York socialite Lorraine Manville Dresselhuys), and Bennett was the orchestrater of Kreisler's music which was originally scored for piano. The Austrian conductor Fritz Mahler served as the production's music director.

Opening at the New Century Theatre on Broadway on November 22, 1944, Rhapsody is set within the court of Roman Emperor Francis I and Empress Maria Theresa. The operetta was directed and choreographed by Russian-American ballet dancer David Lichine; who had achieved fame as a leading artist with The Royal Ballet in London and as a choreographer in Hollywood films. The production boasted highly expensive and elaborate sets designed by Tony Award winning designer Oliver Smith; with a production value of $300,000.00 Frank Bevan designed the production's costumes and Stanley McCandless served as lighting designer. While critics praised the music and the singing of the show's leads, reviews of the operetta's written dialogue were universally bad; and the show was widely mocked in the press as a result. The play closed on December 2, 1944, after just 14 performances which proceeded 8 additional performances given in previews; making it one of the most expensive flops on Broadway at the time that it closed.

== Roles ==
Roles, voice types, premiere cast
Role	Voice type	Premiere cast, 22 November 1944
Empress Maria Theresa	soprano	Annamary Dickey
Emperor Francis I	baritone	George Young
Madame Boticini	soprano	Rosemarie Brancato
Charles Eckert	tenor	John Hamill
Lotzi Hugenhaugen	comic tenor	John Cherry
Lili Hugenhaugen	soprano	Gloria Story
Frau Tina Hugenhaugen	contralto	Bertha Belmore
Captain of the Guard	bass-baritone	Randolph Symonette
Ilse Bonen	dance role	Patricia Bowman
Casanova	comic role	Eddie Mayehoff
Ivan	dance role	George Zoritch
Sonya	dance role	Alexandra Denisova
Demi-Tasse		Mister Johnson
Maid		Mildred Jocelyn
Rickshaw Man		Nicolas Berizoff
The Dandy		Jerry Ross
Jailer		Robert W. Kirkland
