= Marcia Van Dresser =

American actress and singer

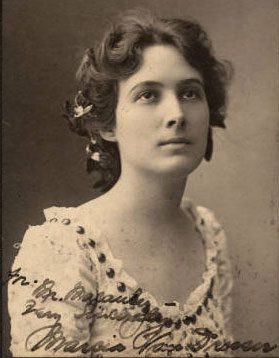
- Van Dresser, circa 1901
- Born: 1877; Memphis, Tennessee
- Died: July 11, 1937; London, England
- Occupation(s): Actress, singer

Marcia Van Dresser (1877 – July 11, 1937) was an American operatic soprano, recitalist and actress. She was sometimes referred to as a mezzo-soprano.

== Biography ==
Van Dresser spent her early life in Memphis and later studied for opera with Hermine Bosetti and Jean de Reszke. She was a member of the Famous Original Bostonians before joining Alice Nielsen Company in 1898 for Victor Herbert's The Fortune Teller and Singing Girl. She studied voice in New York City with Sarah Robinson-Duff, herself trained in Paris by Mathilde Marchesi. Van Dresser appeared as an actress in 1902 with Otis Skinner in a revival of George Henry Boker's Francesca da Rimini. Apparently she never recorded for the gramophone industry. Van Dresser joined New Yorks's Metropolitan Opera company, and sang across Europe before joining the Chicago Opera in 1915 for her major opera roles. In April 1918 she appeared at Aeolian Hall singing Haydn in Italian, Debussy and Fauré in French. The Haydn work had been arranged by Pauline Viardot.

She died in London on July 11, 1937, after a long illness.
