= Gunda Mordhorst =

American singer

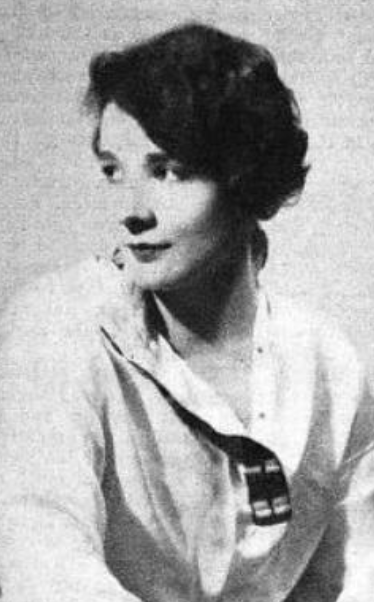
- Gunda Mordhorst, from a 1929 publication
- Born: Gunda Margarethe Mordhorst; May 13, 1898; Ogdensburg, New York, U.S.
- Died: October 1980 (age 82); New York City, U.S.
- Other name: Gunda Mordan
- Occupations: Singer, theatre professional

Gunda Margarethe Mordhorst (May 13, 1898 – October 1980), also known as Gunda Mordan, was an American singer and theatre professional, known for her "costume recitals", in which she wore costumes to match national and historical origins of the songs in her program.

== Early life and education ==
Mordhorst was born in Ogdensburg, New York, the daughter of Oskar Mordhorst and Laura Mabel Thayer Mordhorst. She recalled a childhood spent in Shanghai and in London, and boarding school at St. Mary's Hall in New Jersey. She studied voice and acting with Yvette Guilbert and Enrica Clay Dillon. She also studied singing with Sidney Dietch.

== Career ==
Mordhorst was a soprano singer fluent in four languages. Composer Sandro Corona accompanied her at a Brooklyn performance in 1928. She gave recitals in London in 1929, wearing a succession of historical or national costumes to match the context of the songs on her program. "Her impersonation of a cabaret pierrot who was grise was pathetic and funny at the same time," wrote one reviewer. She was in the cast of Cochran's 1930 Revue in London. In 1932 she performed in Germany and Scandinavia.

Later in her career, as Gunda Mordan, she was heard on radio programs including the Major Bowes Capitol Family Program in 1936. She toured in the United States, including a concert tour with baritone Frederick Baer in 1937 and 1938. "Miss Mordan has a voice that is clear and full," noted a 1938 reviewer, "with charming directness and calm authority."

Mordan was artistic director of Community Opera Inc. of New York in the 1950s. She taught pantomime, singing, and other performance skills in Buffalo, and at the Seagle Music Colony in New York state. In 1966 she directed a production of Hansel and Gretel at Schroon Lake.
