= Sidney Dietch =

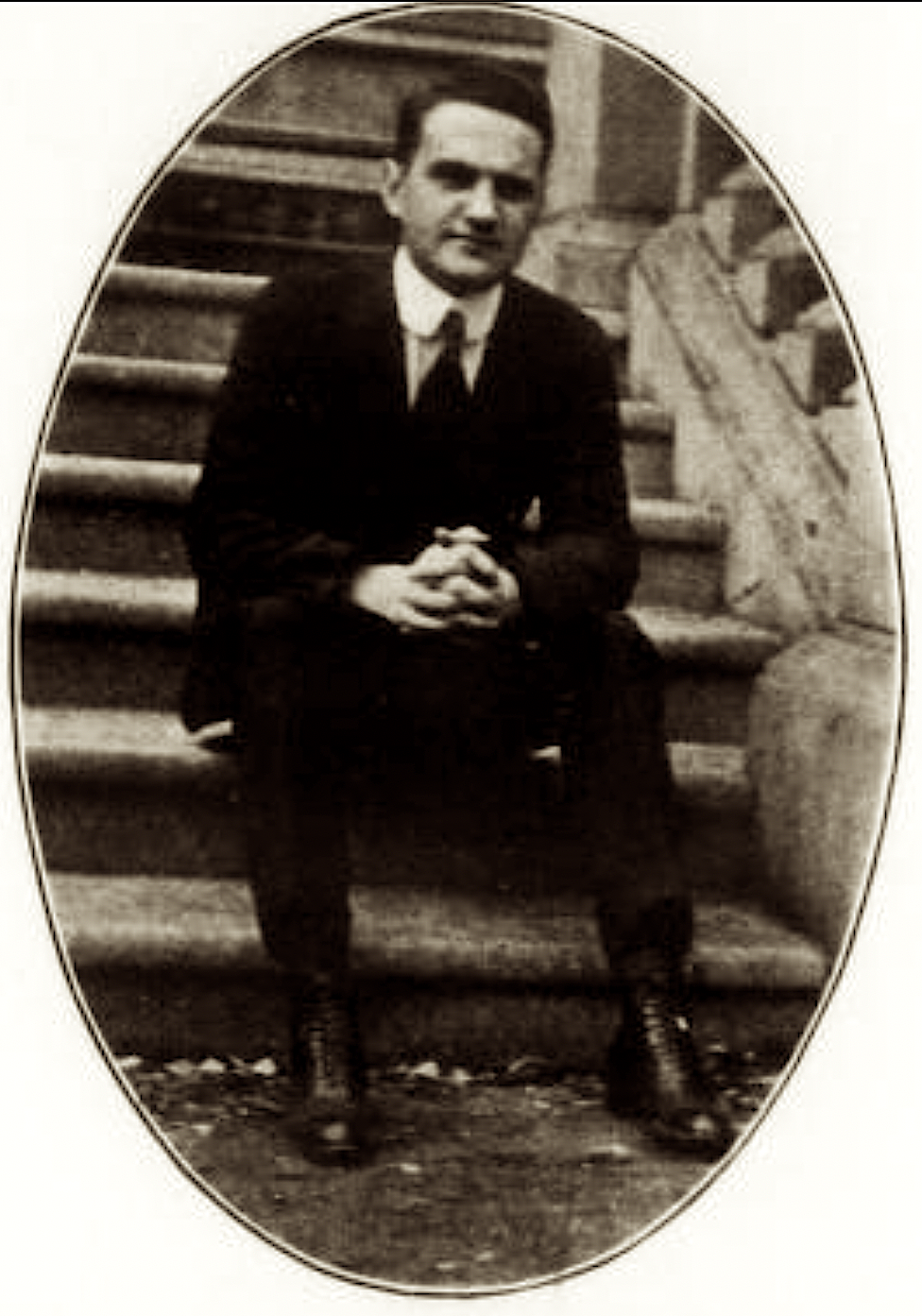
Sidney Arno Dietch. Published in Musical America on September 30, 1916

Sidney Arno Dietch (May 8, 1892 – December 1, 1964) was an American voice teacher, vocal coach, pianist, and organist. A native of Cedar Rapids, Iowa, he was trained as a pianist and vocal pedagogue in Paris, France. He started his career as an organist and teacher of singing in Chicago. In the mid 1910s he began working as an accompanist to singers on the concert stage. In the late 1920 and early 1930s he worked closely with William Vilonat; teaching out of Vilonat's studios in New York City, Berlin, and Dresden, Germany. He took over Vilonat's studio after he died. In 1943 he joined the voice faculty of the Academy of Vocal Arts in Philadelphia where he served twenty years as head of the voice department. He maintained his private studio in New York while teaching in Philadelphia. Many of his students had careers in opera and the concert stage.

== Early life and career ==
Sidney Arno Dietch was born in Cedar Rapids, Iowa on May 8, 1892. He was one of two children born to Samuel and Hannah W. Dietch. He graduated from Washington High School in Cedar Rapids. He studied piano with Moritz Moszkowski in Paris, and spent three years training in that city as a vocal coach. After returning to the United States he worked as an organist, choirmaster, and voice teacher. By 1914 was playing in concerts in the Chautauqua circuit. On November 2, 1914 he performed with the Chicago Symphony Orchestra led by conductor Glenn Dillard Gunn at Orchestra Hall. In 1915 he was active as an accompanist for concerts in Chicago.

In early 1916 Dietch was accompanist for a recital tour given by tenor George Hamlin; including concerts at Aeolian Hall in New York City and the Blackstone Theatre in Chicago. After completing a tour of the American mid-west with Hamlin, he spent time living in Manhattan in Spring 1916. In the summer of 1916 he toured in vaudeville as accompanist to operatic soprano Luella Chilson-Ohrman. He then returned to Chicago where he opened a voice studio in the Fine Arts Building.

He accompanied recitals given by contralto Christine Miller (1917), baritone Paul Althouse (1918), and mezzo-sopranos Hulda Lashanska (1918) and Julia Claussen (1918). He served in the United States Army during World War I; beginning his military service on April 24, 1918. He was appointed bandmaster at the 62nd Street Armory in Bay Ridge, Brooklyn.

== Later life and career ==
In the late 1920s and early 1930s Dietch taught voice in New York City, Berlin, and Dresden, Germany in a studio with baritone William Vilonat. Some of his pupils in this studio included Metropolitan Opera stars Richard Bonelli and Richard Crooks. He took over Vilonat's studio after he died. In 1943 he joined the voice faculty of the Academy of Vocal Arts in Philadelphia. Not long after he became head of the voice department at the school; holding that position for twenty years until his death in 1964. He concurrently taught voice out of a private studio in New York City.

Sidney Dietch died in Manhattan on December 1, 1964.

== Students ==
Singers who studied with Dietch either at AVA or in his private studio included sopranos Natalie Bodanya, Janice Harsanyi, Fedora Kurban, Flora Mattioli de Pasquale, Gunda Mordhorst, Genevieve Rowe, and Margaret Truman; contraltos Christine Johnson and Hilda Kutsukian Kosta; baritones Todd Duncan, Nelson Eddy, Ryan Edwards, John Holland, and Leonard Warren; mezzo-sopranos Gwynn Cornell and Beverly Wolff; bass-baritones Therman Bailey Gene Hollmann, and Julius Huehn; bass Malcolm Smith; and tenors David Bender, Leonardo Del Ferro, and Louis Roney.

Dietch also taught several music educators; among them Arthur E. Westbrook who was the dean of the School of Music at Illinois Wesleyan University; Andrew White who was head of the voice department at Drake University; and Dorothy DiScala who joined him on the voice faculty at AVA. William R. Shoppell, conductor of the Monmouth Civic Chorus, was also one of his students.
