= Hollywood Pinafore =

- or The Lad Who Loved a Salary
- Music: Arthur Sullivan
- Lyrics: George S. Kaufman
- Book: George S. Kaufman
- Basis: Gilbert and Sullivan's; H.M.S. Pinafore
- Productions: Ford's Grand Opera House, Baltimore (1945); Broadway (1945)

Hollywood Pinafore, or The Lad Who Loved a Salary is a musical comedy in two acts by George S. Kaufman, with music by Arthur Sullivan, based on Gilbert and Sullivan's H.M.S. Pinafore. The adaptation transplants the maritime satire of the original Pinafore to a satire of the glamorous world of 1940s Hollywood film making, but Sullivan's score is retained with minor adaptations.

The work premiered on May 8, 1945, at Ford's Grand Opera House in Baltimore for tryouts. It opened on Broadway at the Alvin Theatre on May 31, 1945, and closed on July 14, 1945, after 52 performances. It was directed by Kaufman and starred Annamary Dickey as Brenda Blossom, Shirley Booth as Louhedda Hopsons, Victor Moore as Joseph W. Porter, George Rasely as Mike Corcoran, William Gaxton as Dick, and Mary Wickes as Miss Hebe. The costumes were designed by Mary Percy Schenck.

According to Howard Teichmann's 1972 biography George S. Kaufman: An Intimate Portrait, Kaufman had the inspiration for Hollywood Pinafore during a poker game with his friend Charles Lederer. While Lederer was arranging his cards, he idly sang a few bars of "When I Was a Lad" from Pinafore while ad-libbing a new lyric: "Oh, he nodded his head / and he never said 'no' / and now he's the head of the studio." Kaufman insisted on paying Lederer a token fee for the idea of transplanting Pinafore's setting to a Hollywood studio.

Although Kaufman's lyrics are witty, the book is static for a musical. However, it has been revived a number of times in recent years, including a 1998 "Lost Musicals" staged concert production at the Barbican Centre in London.

== Synopsis ==
Starlet Brenda Blossom, pining for a lowly writer, Ralph, is promised in marriage by her father (a director looking to advance his own career) to the studio head, Joseph Porter. If she marries Ralph, she'll be tossed out of Hollywood and forced to make a living on the stage. Everything turns out for the best when it is discovered that a mix-up in Louhedda Hopsons' gossip column was responsible for Ralph's fall from grace. In reality, it was Ralph who was meant to head the studio instead of Porter.

== Roles and Broadway cast ==
- Joseph W. Porter, head of Pinafore Pictures – Victor Moore
- Mike Corcoran, a director – George Rasely
- Ralph Rackstraw, a writer – Gilbert Russell
- Dick Live-Eye, an agent – William Gaxton
- Brenda Blossom, a star – Annamary Dickey
- Louhedda Hopsons, a columnist (a combination of the names of Louella Parsons and Hedda Hopper) – Shirley Booth
- Bob Beckett, a press agent – Russ Brown
- Miss Hebe, Mr. Porter's secretary – Mary Wickes
- Miss Gloria Mundi – Diana Corday
- Miss Beverly Wilshire – Pamela Randell
- Little Miss Peggy – Ella Mayer
- Doorman – Daniel De Paolo
- Secretaries, Guard, Actors, Actresses, Assistant Directors, Cameramen, Technicians, Singers and Dancers

== Musical numbers ==
Act I

- Simple Movie Folk – Miss Gloria Mundi, Miss Beverly Wilshire, Little Miss Peggy, Girls, Ensemble
- Little Butter-Up – Louhedda Hobson
- An Agent's Lot Is Not a Happy One – Dick Live-Eye
- A Maiden Often Seen – Ralph Rackstraw, Miss Beverly Wilshire, Ensemble
- I'm a Big Director at Pinafore – Mike Corcoran, Ensemble
- Here on the Lot – Brenda Blossom
- Joe Porter's Car is Seen – Male Chorus, Ensemble
- I Am the Monarch of the Joint – Joseph W. Porter, Miss Liebe, Ensemble
- When I Was a Lad – Joseph W. Porter, Ensemble
- A Writer Fills the Lowest Niche – Bob Beckett, Ralph Rackstraw, Guard, Ensemble
- Never Mind the Why and Wherefore – Dick Live-Eye, Ensemble
- Refrain, Audacious Scribe/Proud Lady, Have Your Way – Ralph Rackstraw, Brenda Blossom, Miss Liebe, Ensemble
- Can I Survive This Overbearing? (Finale Act 1) – Dick Live-Eye, Brenda Blossom, Miss Liebe, Ralph Rackstraw, Bob Beckett, Ensemble

ACT II

- Fair Moon – Mike Corcoran
- I Am the Monarch of the Joint (reprise) – Joseph W. Porter, Miss Liebe, Ensemble
- Ballet Interlude: Success Story – Chief Maid, Other Little Maids, Talent Scout, Her True Love, Two More Boys, Armand, the Movie Hero, Director, Studio Assistants
- Hollywood's a Funny Place – Louhedda Hobson, Joseph W. Porter
- To Go Upon the Stage – Brenda Blossom
- He Is a Movie Man – Joseph W. Porter, Dick Live-Eye, Ensemble
- The Merry Maiden and the Jerk – Dick Live-Eye, Joseph W. Porter
- Carefully on Tiptoe Stealing (music brazenly taken from The Pirates of Penzance) – Brenda Blossom, Ralph Rackstraw, Dick Live-Eye, Mike Corcoran, Ensemble
- Pretty Daughter of Mine – Mike Corcoran, Ralph Rackstraw, Miss Liebe, Joseph W. Porter, Dick Live-Eye, Ensemble
- Farewell, My Own – Ralph Rackstraw, Brenda Blossom, Miss Liebe, Joseph W. Porter, Louhedda Hobson, Bob Beckett, Ensemble
- This Town I Now Must Shake – Louhedda Hobson, Ensemble
- Finale Act 2 – Entire Company
