= Sarah Robinson-Duff =

American opera singer (died 1934)

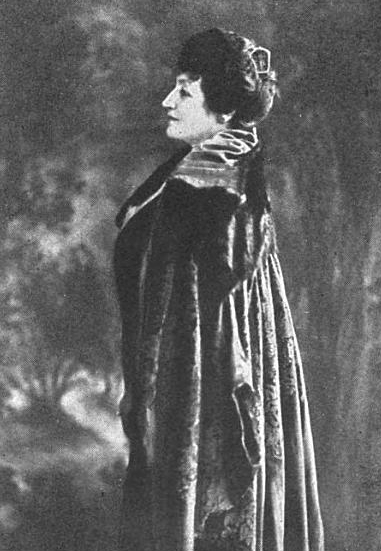
Photograph of Sarah Robinson-Duff published in Simple Truths Used by Great Singers (1919)

Sarah Robinson-Duff (May 1, 1868 – May 11, 1934) was an American operatic soprano and celebrated voice teacher of many important opera singers, including Mary Garden and Alice Nielsen. She wrote the vocal pedagogy book Simple Truths Used by Great Singers (1919) which was based in the tradition of Robinson-Duff's teacher, Mathilde Marchesi. She is considered one of the most important American voice teachers of the late 19th and early 20th centuries.

== Life and career ==
Born in Bangor, Maine on May 1, 1868, Robinson-Duff was the daughter of Henry K. Robinson and his wife Frances Robinson (née McClintock). She was a descendant of John Robinson (1576–1625), the pastor of the "Pilgrim Fathers" before they left on the Mayflower. When she was 18 she married Colonel Charles Duff. Their daughter, Frances Robinson-Duff (1878–1951), became an important teacher of drama whose students included Katharine Hepburn, Dorothy Gish, Helen Hayes, Mary Pickford, and Clark Gable among many others. They also had two sons: Roden Robinson-Duff, a physician in Chicago, and Jay Robinson-Duff, a trader on the New York Stock exchange.

Robinson-Duff studied singing in Europe with George Henschel and Mathilde Marchesi. Before her teaching career she was active as a soprano in concerts and operas in Europe. She taught singing in Chicago from 1889 through 1897 where one of her pupils was Mary Garden. Her voice studio was located at No. 63 Auditorium Building. In 1890 she performed in recital with her students at Central Music Hall. In 1897 she relocated to Paris, and celebrated the turn of the century at a party held by Horace Porter, United States Ambassador to France, and his wife. She taught singing in Paris for 22 years. In 1919 she returned to the United States and settled in New York City where she continued to teach voice. One of her students was soprano Florence Kimball, the teacher of Leontyne Price, who became a celebrated voice teacher at the Juilliard School for 45 years. Her other successful students included contralto Jessie Bartlett Davis; sopranos Frieda Hempel, Mary McCormic, Alice Nielsen, and Marcia Van Dresser; mezzo-sopranos Olive Fremstad and Fanchon H. Thompson; and vaudeville star Nora Bayes. She was quoted in The New York Times as stating: "Breath and brains are the qualifications most necessary for a singer."

She died in New York City on May 11, 1934.
