= Hermine Bosetti =

German opera singer

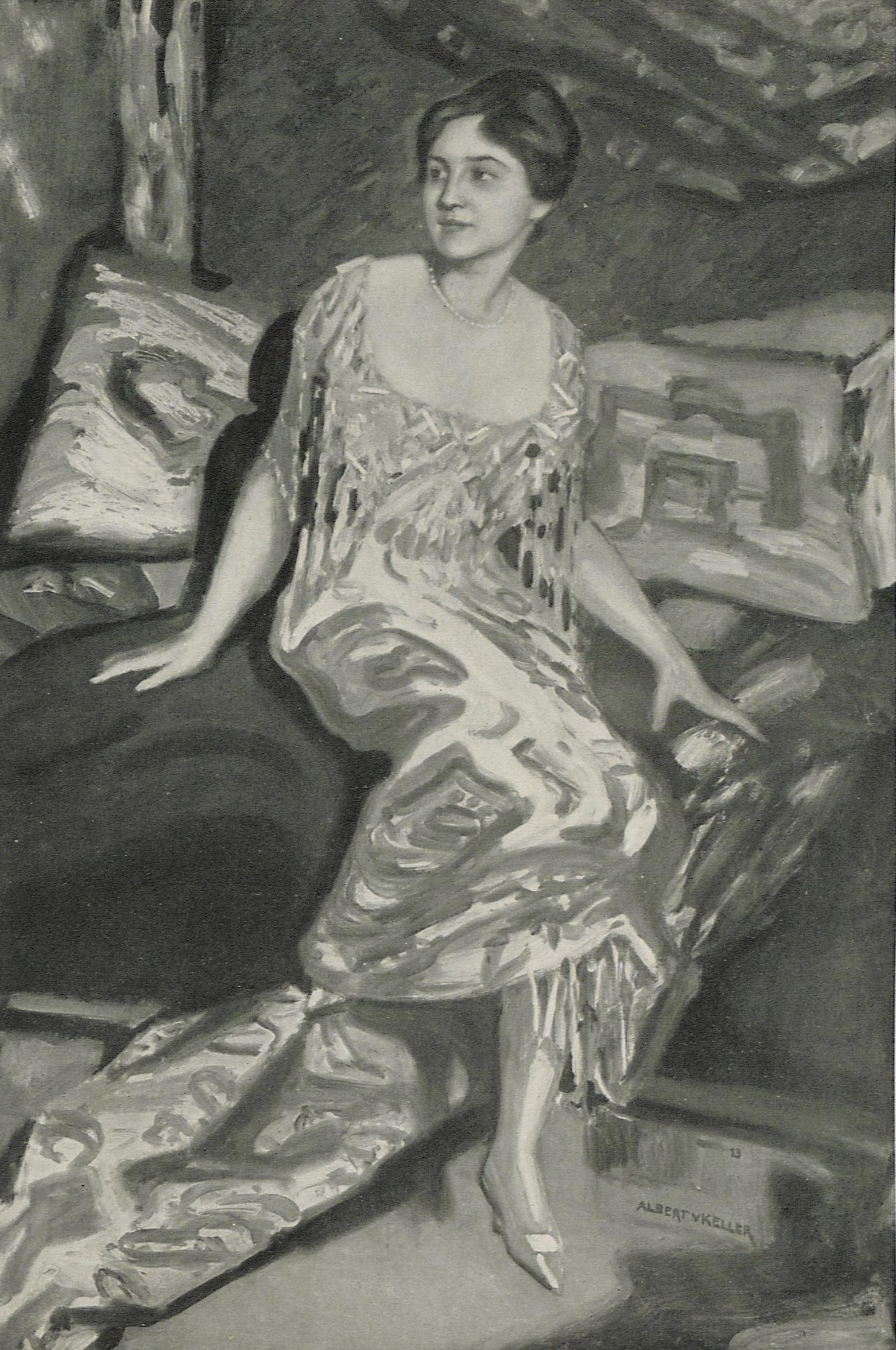
By Albert von Keller, c. 1913

Hermine Bosetti married von Flick (28 September 1875, Vienna – 1 May 1936, Höhenrain near Lake Starnberg), was an Austrian coloratura soprano.

Bosetti made her debut in Wiesbaden (1898) as "Ännchen" in Der Freischütz. In 1900, she became a member of the Vienna State Opera and from 1901 until 1924 she was a star singer with the Bavarian State Opera. In 1903, she sang the role of "Colombina" in the first performance of Le donne curiose (Ermanno Wolf-Ferrari). She appeared in most of the German opera houses as well as in the Netherlands, Belgium, London, and Russia. In 1905 she was appointed Kammersängerin. In 1908, she sang roles such as "The Queen of the Night" (Die Zauberflöte) and "Marguerite de Valois" (Les Huguenots) as a guest artist in Vienna.

She recorded for G&T/Gramophone and Odeon.

She taught at the Hoch Conservatory in Frankfurt am Main from 1925 to 1930. Among her students were Marcia Van Dresser and Adele Kern.

In 1913, she became the face of Aok products in Germany in their advertising, claiming "I have used Aok soap for years".

== Recordings ==
- Hermine Bosetti 1875–1936. Court Opera Classics CO 396 (LP)
- The Record of Singing (Part 2): Fra Diavolo – Welches Glück ich atme freier (Munich, 1906)
- Aus Münchens Operngeschichte – Sängerinnen und Sänger der Münchner Hof- und Staatsoper von 1900–1945: Die Entführung aus dem Serail – Martern aller Arten
- Sie sangen im Prinzregententheater: Die Entführung aus dem Serail – Ach ich liebte.

== Sources ==
- Cahn, Peter: Das Hoch'sche Konservatorium in Frankfurt am Main (1878–1978). Frankfurt am Main: Kramer, 1979, ISBN 3-7829-0214-9.
- Kesting, Jürgen: Die großen Sänger. Düsseldorf: Claassen, 1986; ISBN 3-546-45387-5, p. 750 f
- Karl Josef Kutsch/ Leo Riemens: Großes Sängerlexikon. München: K. G. Saur 2003, ISBN 3-598-11598-9, p 530 f
- Rainer E. Lotz, Axel Weggen, Oliver Wurl und Christian Zwarg: Discographie der deutschen Gesangsaufnahmen, Vol. 4. Bonn: Lotz 2005, ISBN 3-9810248-0-X, pp 1459–1469.
