= Anna Hamlin =

American singer (1898–1988)

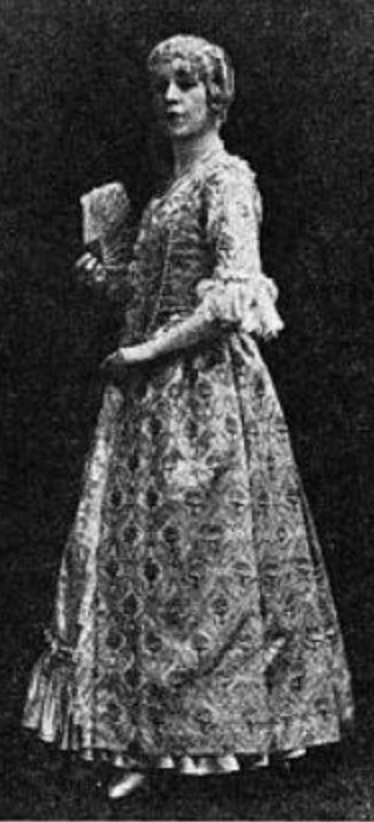
- Anna Hamlin in costume, from a 1927 publication
- Born: Anna Mary Hamlin; September 10, 1898; Chicago, Illinois, U.S.
- Died: May 24, 1988 (aged 89); New York, New York, U.S.
- Occupations: Opera singer, voice teacher
- Parent: George Hamlin

Anna Hamlin (September 10, 1898 – May 24, 1988) was an American soprano singer associated with the Chicago Civic Opera Company. From 1939 to 1959, she was a professor of voice at Smith College, and "widely known as one of the most distinguished of voice teachers".

== Early life and education ==
Hamlin was born in Chicago, the daughter of George Hamlin and Harriet Rebecca Eldredge Hamlin. Her father was a noted tenor singer. She studied voice with Marcella Sembrich.

== Career ==
Hamlin was a lyric soprano who appeared in opera roles and gave recitals. With the Chicago Civic Opera she played the Page in Masked Ball in 1927. In 1928, she was a soloist at the Adirondack Music Festival and sang in Monte Carlo. Composer Amy Beach dedicated a song to Hamlin. In 1931, she gave a recital in Cincinnati, including a song by local composer Louise Snodgrass. She sang on radio in the 1930s.

From 1939 to 1959, Hamlin was a music professor at Smith College. She conducted summer master classes in Milan in 1956. Her students included Judith Raskin, music professor Lynn Clarke Meyers, Lucy Kelston, Daniel Ferro, Nico Castel, and actress Jane White. In retirement she wrote a memoir, Father was a Tenor (1978).

== Publications ==
- Father was a Tenor (1978)

== Personal life and legacy ==
Hamlin died in 1988, at the age of 89, in a New York City nursing home. Her memorial service was held in a recital space at Carnegie Hall. The George and Anna Hamlin Papers, including her diaries and concert programs, are in the collection of the New York Public Library.
