= Marcella Sembrich =

Polish opera singer (1858–1935)

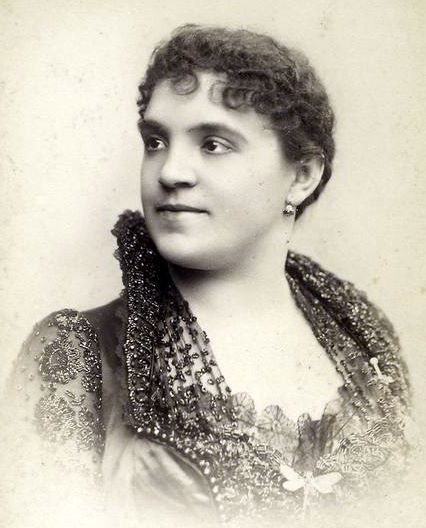
- Sembrich in the 1880s
- Born: February 15, 1858; Wisniewczyk, Austro-Hungarian Empire (now Ukraine)
- Died: January 11, 1935 (aged 76)
- Occupations: dramatic coloratura soprano, music teacher
- Spouse: Wilhelm Stengel
- Musical career
- Genres: Classical, romantic
- Labels: RCA Victor Red Seal, Nimbus records, Columbia

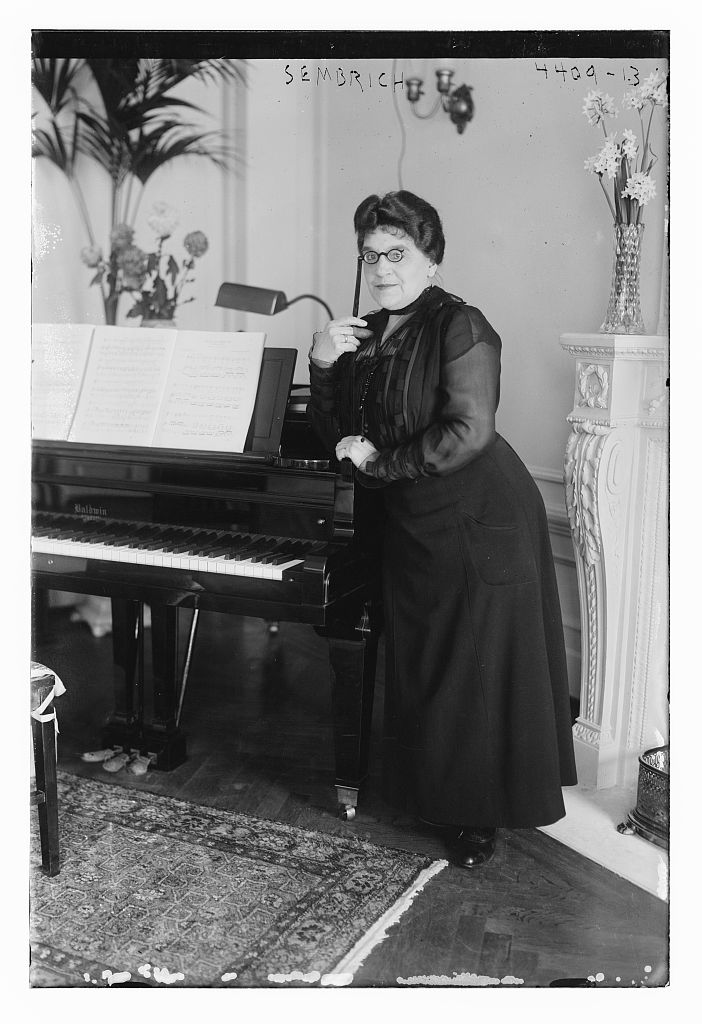
Marcella Sembrich in 1917

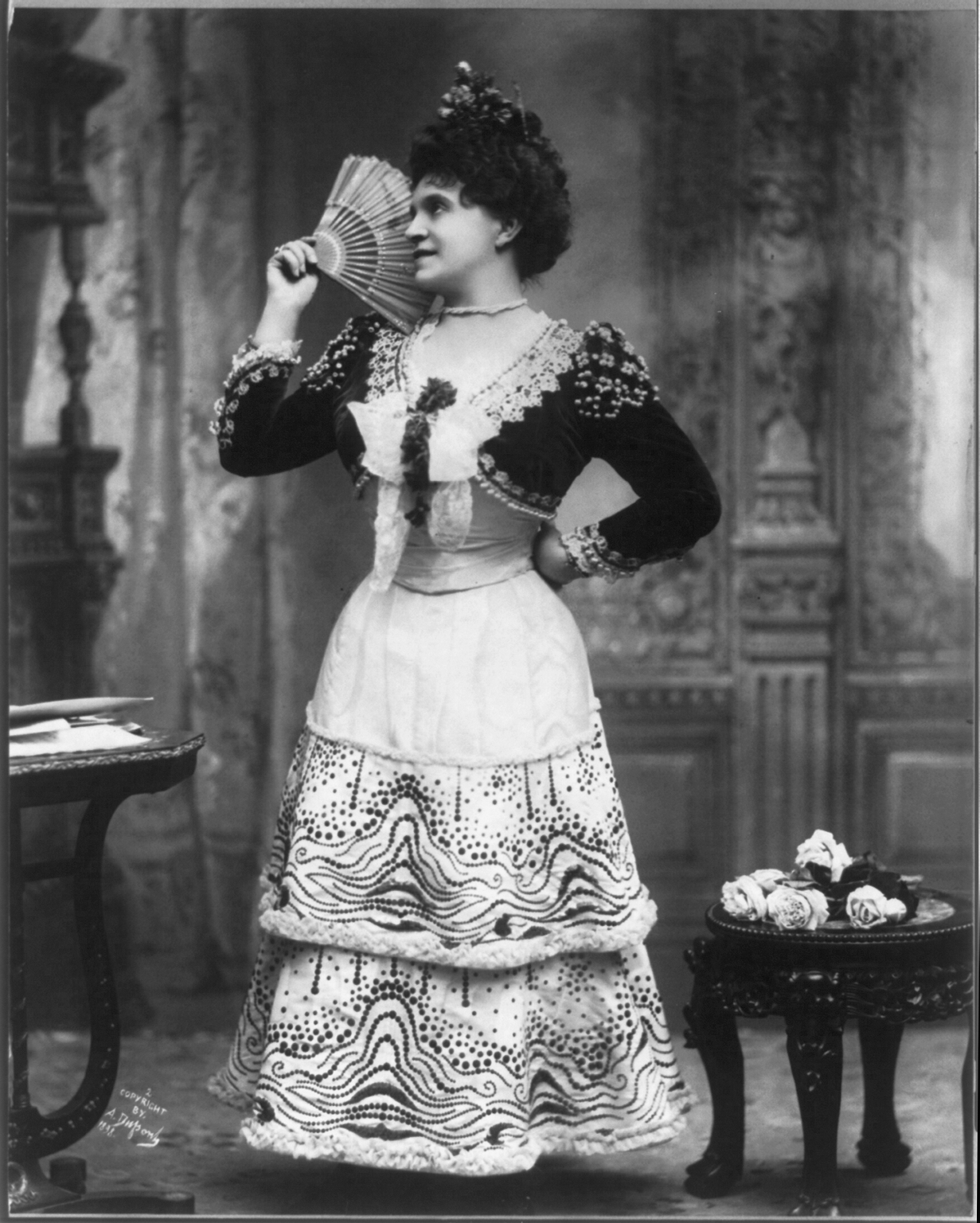
Sembrich in the role of Rosina

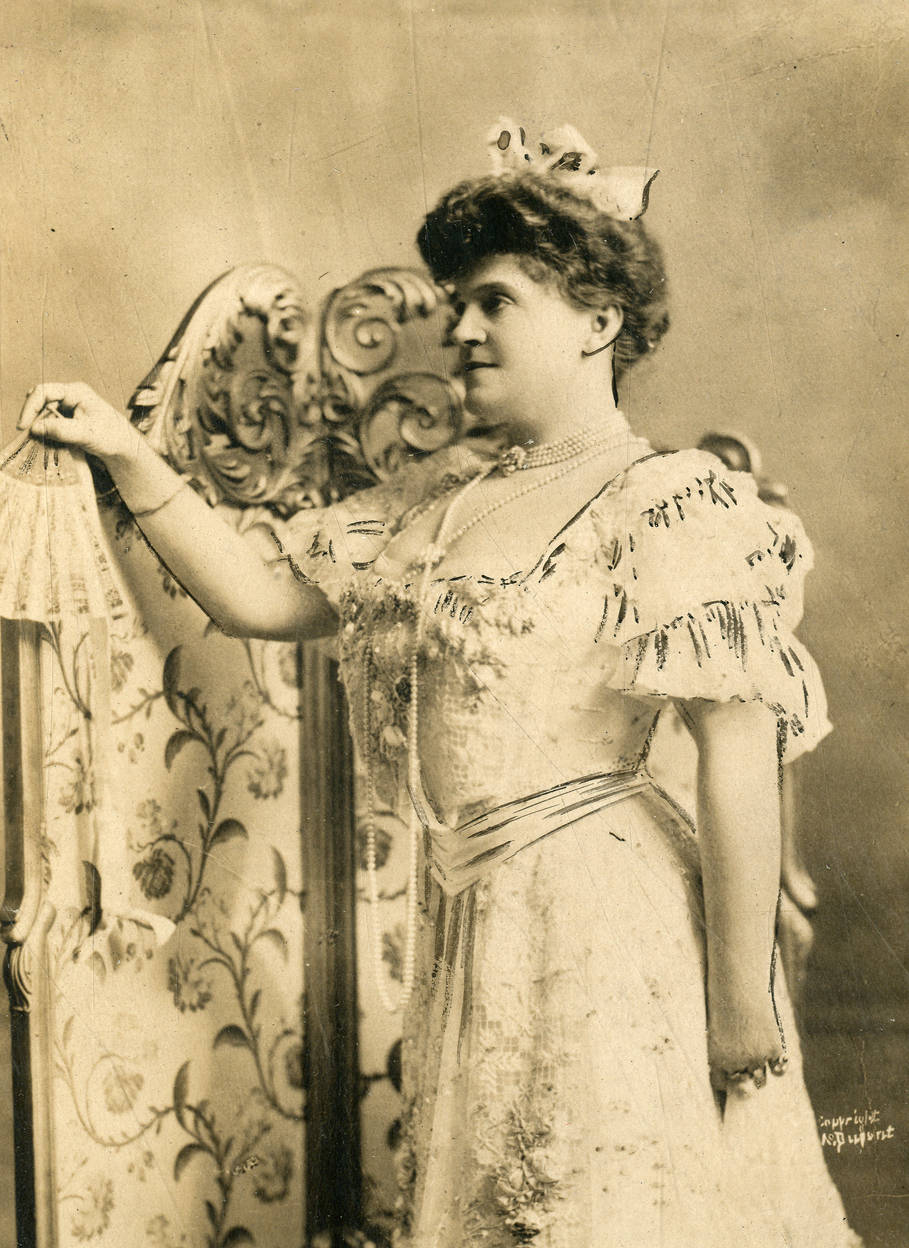
Sembrich in 1911

Prakseda Marcelina Kochańska (February 15, 1858 – January 11, 1935), known professionally as Marcella Sembrich, was a Polish dramatic coloratura soprano. She is known for her extensive range of two and a half octaves, precise intonation, charm, portamento, vocal fluidity, and impressive coloratura. Her voice was regarded as flute-like and pure. She had an international singing career, chiefly at the New York Metropolitan Opera and the Royal Opera House, in London.

== Early life ==
Sembrich was born at Wisniewczyk which lies in the Polish region of Austro-Hungarian occupied Galicia, now part of Ukraine. The young Sembrich first studied violin and piano with her father, and earned money to support her family and pay for studies by playing for parties of nobility. She would often play in the town center, and became well known and liked by locals. An elderly man nicknamed Dziadek Lanowitch, took a liking to her and at age ten sent her to the Lemberg Conservatory in what was then Lwow, Poland.

== Education ==
While at the Lemberg Conservatory, she studied piano with her future husband Wilhelm Stengel and violin with Sigismond Bruckmann. When she was sixteen years old, Stengel took her to perform for Franz Liszt in Weimar. Liszt encouraged her to develop her voice: ‘Sing, sing for the world, for you have the voice of an angel.’ This led Sembrich to pursue musical studies in Vienna and Milan. In the Autumn of 1875 she began her studies at the Vienna Conservatory, studying violin with Joseph Hellmesberger Sr., piano with Julius Epstein, and voice with Viktor Rokitansky. After a year she decided to fully devote her studies to voice lessons. She arrived in Milan in September 1876 to study with one of the most renowned vocal teachers on the continent, namely Giovanni Battista Lamperti, son of the eminent teacher Francesco Lamperti, with whom she would later study in 1885.

== Career ==
After less than a year of study with the younger of the two Lampertis, Sembrich made her debut in opera at Athens as Elvira in Bellini's I puritani on June 3, 1877. She sang not only I Puritani, but also Dinorah, Lucia di Lammermoor, Robert le diable and La sonnambula! It is a testament to her proper early training that a 19-year-old soprano could learn so many roles in a foreign language so quickly. Her letters indicate that she could speak English, Polish, German, French, and Italian.

That year, she also married her piano teacher, Wilhelm Stengel. When in Athens, she first appeared under the name “Marcella Bosio”, because she felt that her last name was too hard for audiences to pronounce. Not long after she opted to adopt her mother's maiden name, Sembrich.

After Athens, she was to appear with the Vienna Opera, but due to pregnancy she broke the contract. During her pregnancy and after the birth of her first son, Wilhelm Marcel, she continued her vocal studies, this time with Marie Seebach and Richard Lewey in Vienna.

After a long and frustrating search for an opera engagement, she was hired as a guest at the Dresden Royal Opera House in September 1878, debuting as Lucia in Donizetti's Lucia di Lammermoor. After this success, she was dubbed the "Polish Patti." She was immediately made a member of the company and remained in Dresden battling opera house politics, until 1880. She broke her contract at Dresden and sang a number of concerts to raise money to go to London. She had an auspicious audition with the impresario Ernest Gye at Covent Garden and signed a contract there for five seasons. In June 1880 she created a sensation in her debut at Covent Garden as Lucia. She became a great favorite in the characters of Zerlina, Don Giovanni; Susanna, The Marriage of Figaro; Konstanze, The Abduction from the Seraglio; Lady Harriet/Martha, Martha; and, of course, Lucia.

In 1883, Sembrich went to the United States to sing in the newly founded Metropolitan Opera company. She made her Met debut as Lucia in the company premiere of Lucia di Lammermoor on October 24, 1883. Sembrich sang more debut roles than any other singer in the company's history. She was the Met's first Queen of the Night in Die Zauberflöte, Elvira in I Puritani, Violetta in La Traviata, Amina in La Sonnambula, Gilda in Rigoletto, Marguerite in Les Huguenots and Rosina in Il Barbiere di Siviglia. She was also the first to record on the Mapleson Cylinders backstage at The Met. Due to the terrific financial loss of the company that year, Italian opera was abandoned and German opera reigned supreme at the Met for the next dozen years or so. In 1888, Sembrich relocated to Berlin. For next three decades, Sembrich traveled across the United States and Europe singing in major cities including Dresden, London, Madrid, Paris, St. Petersburg, New York. Sembrich was a tremendous favorite at the Italian Opera inform 1890 to 1897.

Sembrich returned to the Met in 1898. In total, she sang more than 450 Met performances in her 11 seasons there, and remained associated with the company until 1909, when the silver jubilee of her Met debut was celebrated with a farewell gala.

She gave recitals until 1917. Sembrich would often end her recitals with piano or violin performances. Many that knew her claim that her experience with the violin made her a sensible and instinctual singer. The diva also made it her mission to promote Polish art as much as possible; her concerts almost always featured a piece by a Polish composer. After this date, she started the vocal programs at both Curtis Institute in Philadelphia and at the Juilliard School of Music, where she ended up teaching once she retired. Her students included Alma Gluck, Hulda Lashanska, Queena Mario, Edna de Lima, Dusolina Giannini, Josephine Antoine, Natalie Bodanya, Annamary Dickey, Nancy McCord, Jane Pickens. Additionally, some of her students in turn became important vocal teachers around the country. Among them were Anna Hamlin (teacher of Judith Raskin) at Smith College, and Florence Page Kimball (teacher of Leontyne Price) at Juilliard, Eufemia Gregory (teacher of Anna Moffo, Judith Blegen and Frank Guarrera) at the Curtis Institute.

The outbreak of World War I had made it impossible for the diva to return to her beloved Alps during the summers. Sembrich turned instead to the Adirondack Mountains area and spent summers at Lake Placid from 1915 to 1921, and then at a home on Lake George from 1922 to 1934. The Marcella Sembrich Opera Museum can be found at Bolton Landing, New York. The museum contains many mementos from the diva's career.

== Death ==
Sembrich died on January 11, 1935, at her home, 151 Central Park West in Manhattan, New York City.

== Reception ==
Sembrich's 1883 Met debut elicited praise from all who heard her. The New York Truth called Sembrich "an artist of the foremost rank among the living". The New York Journal dubbed her "queen of the opera season so far. Her Lucia is a marvel of voice, execution and magnetism. [She] sings deliciously. There seemed to be no limit to her vocalization: notes run out like pearls falling into a casket with infinite richness, and apparently no effort." Until her retirement at the end of the 1908–09 season, Sembrich captivated audience after audience. Her farewell gala and performance, one of the most lavish farewells in Met history, sold out within two hours of going on sale. At the gala, Sembrich's first entrance was met with a standing ovation lasting several minutes.

=== The Victor Recordings ===
Recorded in 1908–1919, the Victor Recordings feature Sembrich's renditions of arias from Rigoletto, Lucia di Lammermoor, Semiramide, Linda di Chamounix, I Vespri Siciliani, The Merry Widow, Ernani, La Traviata and Waltz Dream. James Camner, in his review of the album in Opera News, notes that Marcella was "past her prime" when recording technology came to popularity, but she was still one of the first of her time to produce full-length albums. But more important, according to ARSC Journal, is the access to her recordings. Richard LeSueur, reviewer for ARSC Journal, states that her recordings may have been controversial at the time, but it provides a broader picture of her art.

== Legacy ==
Following her death, the New York Times and The Musical Times gave Sembrich obituaries that highlighted her time in the spotlight of the opera world. Fans across the world mourned her death and the loss of one of the great artists of the time; The New York Times states "her death removes one of the last remaining artists from the rapidly thinning ranks of those who form a link with the great traditions of the past. Fortunate are those who remember her in her days of artistic affluence."

Off stage, she was a dedicated teacher and philanthropist, highlighted below:

- Over the summers Sembrich would retreat to her studio on Lake George in Bolton Landing, New York. She would house and host her students for the summer while they continued their studies with her. Today the studio serves as The Marcella Sembrich Opera Museum and contains many mementos from the diva's life.
- She made a substantial impression on both her teachers and students. Her former teacher Lamperti, dedicated his book about the art of singing to her.
- She was a great Polish patriot and humanitarian throughout her life. During World War One she was President of the American-Polish Relief Committee of New York. She was wholly devoted to raising money, food, and clothes for her suffering countrymen. The Kosciuszko Foundation, Inc., an American center for Polish culture in New York City, annually holds the "Marcella Sembrich Voice Competition". The competition is open to singers up to the age of 35 who are not under professional management. The American Council for Polish Culture [ACPC] also honors Sembrich with an annual vocal competition for singers of Polish descent, the "ACPC Marcella Kochańska Sembrich Vocal Competition". She also had organized concerts and activities to raise money for victim of the San Francisco earthquake.
- Two portraits of Sembrich, one in costume, were painted in 1899 by the Swiss-born American artist Adolfo Müller-Ury (1862–1947) but are now lost. Her 1936 portrait by Alice Ruggles Sohier (1880–1969) now hangs in the Metropolitan Opera House. She also made a number of acoustic recordings prior to World War 1 for both Columbia Records (1903) and the Victor Talking Machine Company. Although these fail to do justice to her voice and undoubted artistry, they have been reissued on CD and repay careful listening.

== See also ==
- List of Poles
