= George Rasely =

American opera singer (1890–1965)

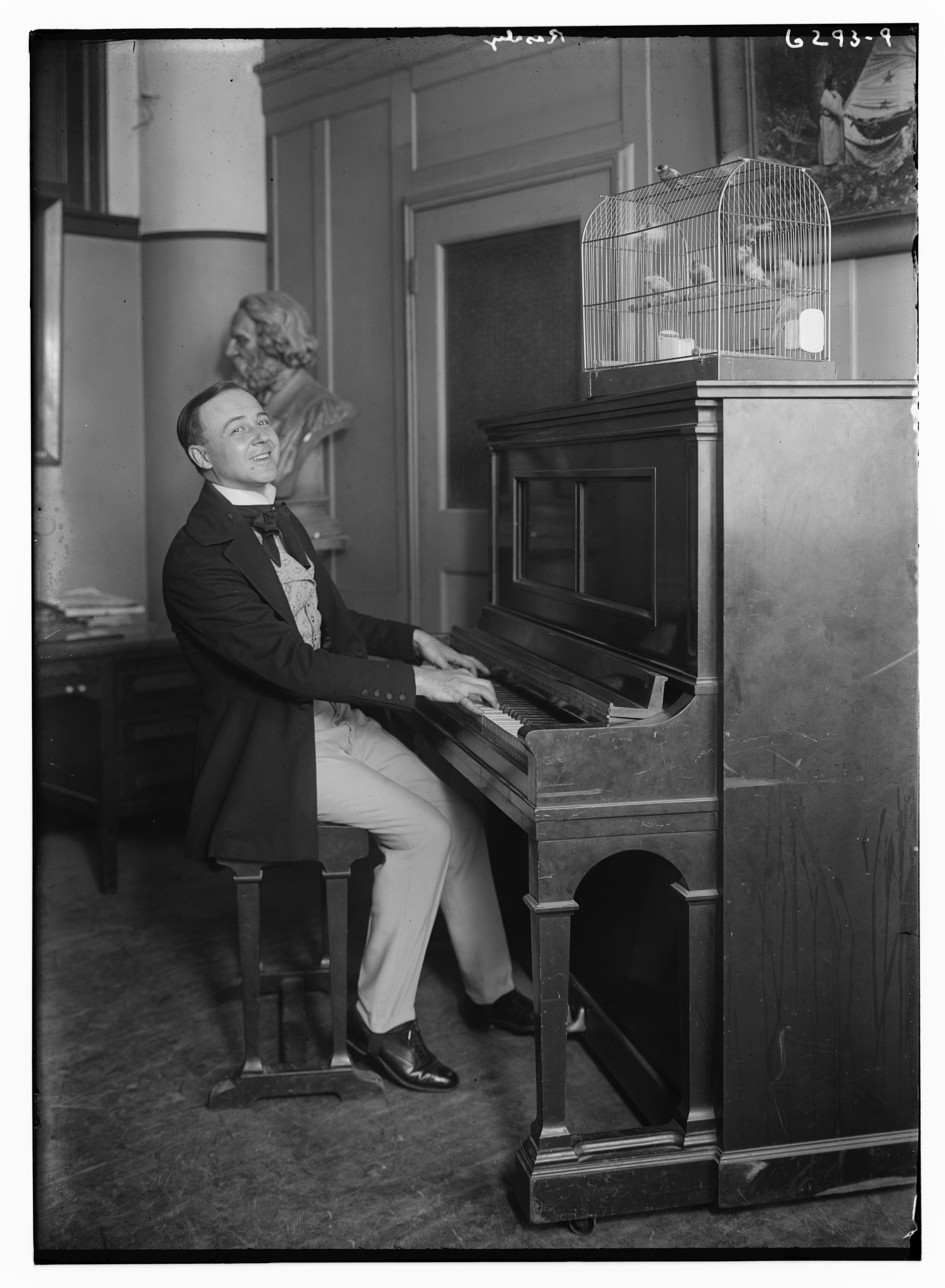
George Rasely, c. 1924

George Rasely (October 27, 1890 – 3 January 1965) was an American tenor who had an active career in operas, concerts, and musicals during the first half of the 20th century. He was also a frequent performer on American radio during the 1920s through the 1940s. He won the National Music League singing competition in 1927 and the Walter W. Naumburg Foundation vocal competition in 1928.

Born in St. Louis, Missouri, Rasely made his Broadway debut in 1917 as Nur-Al-Huda in Frederic Norton's Chu Chin Chow. He was a part of The Greenwich Village Follies between 1922 and 1924. He returned to Broadway again in 1939 to portray Mr. Scratch in The Devil and Daniel Webster. His other Broadway credits include La Vie parisienne (1941), Helen Goes to Troy (1944), and Hollywood Pinafore (1945). In 1928, he was committed to the Philadelphia Civic Opera Company where he notably portrayed the role of Schweiker von Gundelfingen in the United States premiere of Richard Strauss's Feuersnot on 2 December 1927 at Philadelphia's Metropolitan Opera House under the baton of Alexander Smallens.

In 1936, Rasely joined the roster of the Metropolitan Opera in New York City, making his debut with the company as Vasek in Bedřich Smetana's The Bartered Bride on May 15, 1936, with Muriel Dickson as Marenka, Mario Chamlee as Jeník, and Wilfred Pelletier conducting. He remained at the Met for the next eight years, notably creating the role of Harman Blennerhassett in the world premiere of Walter Damrosch's The Man Without a Country on May 12, 1937, and portraying Gherardi in the United States premiere of Richard Hageman's Caponsacchi on February 4, 1937. His other roles at the Met included Don Curzio in The Marriage of Figaro, Fellah in Mârouf, Gherardo in Gianni Schicchi, Nathanael in The Tales of Hoffmann, Paolino in Il matrimonio segreto, and the Poet in Louise among others. His final performance at the Met was on March 22, 1944, as Bardolfo in Falstaff with Leonard Warren in the title role.
