= Florence Kimball =

American soprano and voice teacher (1888–1977)

- Florence Kimball in 1973
- Born: Florence Page Kimball; April 26, 1888; Salt Lake City, Utah, U.S.
- Died: November 24, 1977 (aged 89); Greenwich Village, New York, U.S.
- Education: Juilliard School
- Occupations: Operatic soprano; Voice teacher

Florence Page Kimball (April 26, 1888 – November 24, 1977) was an American soprano who became a celebrated voice teacher at the Juilliard School where she taught for 46 years. She taught hundreds of students, and many of her pupils had successful performance careers. Her most famous student was soprano Leontyne Price. As a soprano Kimball was primarily active as a recitalist. In 1929 she performed Verdi arias in a touring vaudeville production.

== Life and career ==
Born in Salt Lake City, Utah, Kimball was educated at a boarding school before going to Paris to study singing with Sarah Robinson‐Duff, the teacher of Mary Garden, and Frank King Clark. She later studied the piano with Mary Alport, Carlo Buonamici and Arthur Shepherd in the United States. During World War I she entertained American and French troops as a member of the YMCA's Over There League. While in France she was awarded the Ordre national du Mérite in 1917 for her volunteer musical service during the war. In 1919 she assisted in taking care of refugee children in Soissons, France.

In the 1920s, Kimball moved back to America to study singing with Marcella Sembrich at the Juilliard School in New York City. In 1927 Kimball replaced Sembrich at Juilliard when she retired. Kimball continued to teach at Juilliard until her retirement 45 years later in 1972. She had hundreds of voice students during her tenure; many of whom had successful careers, including: Annamary Dickey, Martha Flowers, Sung Sook Lee, Jean Madeira, Joyce Mathis, Mariquita Moll, Regina Sarfaty, Nigi Sato, Wilma Shakesneider and Veronica Tyler. Notably among her students is Patrica Carey, mother and vocal teacher to Mariah Carey. Her most famous pupil was Leontyne Price whom she began teaching in 1949. Price developed an extremely close relationship to Kimball, and her teacher continued to work closely with her on preparing her roles for the Metropolitan Opera; even helping her select her costumes and think through stage movements in addition to working on the music material. In a 1983 interview, Price stated of her association with Florence Kimball:

It was the most important relationship of my life. Like sex it was pure chemistry ... She told me there was an innate quality of dignity in my voice, and that I moved like I sounded.

Kimball continued to perform periodically while teaching. She made her New York debut on December 3, 1925, at Aeolian Hall while studying with Sembrich. During her years as a teacher at Juilliard she also gave recitals at The Town Hall and made recital tours. In 1929 she starred in the Cal Levance Show, a vaudeville-style production featuring multiple kinds of entertainments including Kimball performing Verdi arias, which started in Chicago and then toured to other cities including a stop at the Cincinnati Music Hall.

Kimball died at Saint Vincent's Catholic Medical Centers in Greenwich Village at the age of 87. She was a friend of composer Samuel Barber, who dedicated his choral work "To Be Sung on the Water" (1968) to her.
