= Muriel Dickson =

Scottish soprano and actress (1903–1990)

Muriel Dickson as Josephine in H.M.S. Pinafore

Muriel Dickson (12 July 1903 – 11 March 1990) was a Scottish soprano who was particularly known for her performances in the works of Gilbert and Sullivan. After performing with the D'Oyly Carte Opera Company for seven years, she sang for four seasons with the Metropolitan Opera and went on to a concert career. In later years, she taught singing at the Royal Scottish Academy of Music and Drama and privately.

== Early years and D'Oyly Carte ==
Born Constance Muriel Dickson in Edinburgh, she studied singing in Florence, Italy with Luigi Ricci.

In March 1928 she became a member of the D'Oyly Carte Opera Company, initially as a member of the chorus, performing in the company's repertory of Gilbert and Sullivan operas. Her nickname with the company was "Poppy". She had the opportunity, during her first season, to fill in as the principal soprano, Mabel, in The Pirates of Penzance. Soon, she was given the small roles of Fleta in Iolanthe, and, the next year, Ada in Princess Ida. In 1931, she was also given the small part of Ruth in Ruddigore, but she understudied and occasionally performed the leading roles of Mabel in Pirates, the title role in Patience, Yum-Yum in The Mikado, Elsie Maynard in The Yeomen of the Guard, and both Casilda and Gianetta in The Gondoliers.

After the departure from the company of Winifred Lawson in 1931, Dickson more regularly performed several of the leading roles, including Josephine in H.M.S. Pinafore, Mabel in Pirates, the title role in Patience, Phyllis in Iolanthe, Lady Psyche in Princess Ida, Yum-Yum in The Mikado, Rose Maybud in Ruddigore, Elsie in Yeomen, and Gianetta in The Gondoliers. In 1932, she exchanged Psyche for the title role in Princess Ida and took on the new part of Aline in The Sorcerer. She continued to play most of these roles until June 1935. She recorded six of her roles for His Master's Voice: Gianetta (1931), Mabel (1931), Rose Maybud (1931), Elsie Maynard (1931), Princess Ida (1932) and Aline (1933). She also sang roles in the company's live and studio broadcasts, including Yum-Yum (1932 and 1933), Elsie (1932 and 1935) and Giannetta (1932).

== Metropolitan Opera and later years ==
Dickson toured with D'Oyly Carte to New York City in 1934–1935. Her performances with the company drew the attention of Edward Johnson, the then newly appointed director of the Metropolitan Opera. Johnson offered her a contract with the company which she accepted. On 15 May 1936 Dickson made her Met debut as Marenka in Bedřich Smetana's The Bartered Bride, conducted by Wilfred Pelletier, with Mario Chamlee as Jeník and George Rasely as Vasek, the latter of whom partnered with her in many operas. She helped to prepare the English translation for the production. Time magazine wrote that she "exhibited a sure, clear voice, a pleasing professional stage presence and a diction so polished that it was difficult to believe that the D'Oyly Carte once frowned on her for a burry Scottish accent." Helen Noble wrote, "What a hubbub there was around the Opera House about Muriel Dickson; how charming she was, how delightfully she sang.

Dickson remained at the Met for the next four years, portraying such roles as Carolina in the company's premiere of Il matrimonio segreto, the title role in the company premiere of Gian Carlo Menotti's Amelia Goes to the Ball, and the part of Nedda in Pagliacci. Her last performance at the Met was on 15 January 1940 as Musetta in Giacomo Puccini's La Bohème with Bidu Sayão as Mimi, Jussi Björling as Rodolfo, John Brownlee as Marcello, and Gennaro Papi conducting. During these years, she also sang in concerts, including performances at Carnegie Hall and The Town Hall.

After leaving the Met, Dickson spent the next five years performing as a concert soloist and recitalist in England, the US and Italy. In 1945, she returned to the UK for what she intended to be a brief holiday. There she met an old boyfriend, fell in love and married. She retired from singing, and although Covent Garden offered her the role of Octavian in Der Rosenkavalier, she declined and never sang publicly again. For the next decade, she worked as an antiques dealer, but in 1955, she joined the faculty of the Royal Scottish Academy of Music and Drama, teaching there for the next 21 years. She retired from the Academy in the 1970s but continued to teach privately out of her home in Glasgow up until her death in 1990 at the age of 86.
