= Patricia Bowman =

American dancer (1908–1999)

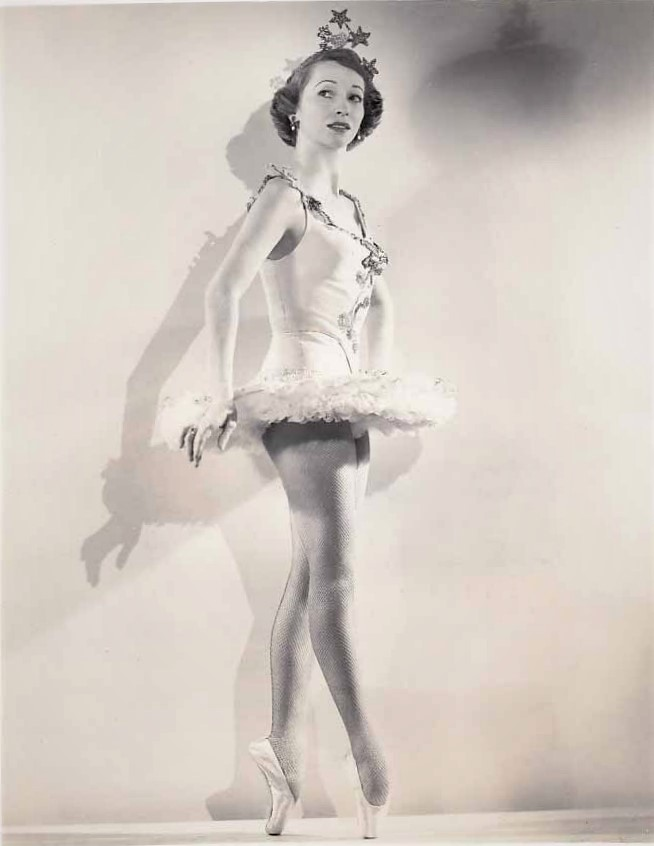
Bowman, press photograph for The Patricia Bowman Show in 1951

Patricia Bowman (December 12, 1908 – March 18, 1999) was an American ballerina, ballroom dancer, musical theatre actress, television personality, and dance teacher.

Dance critic Jack Anderson described her as "the first American ballerina to win critical acclaim and wide popularity as a classical and a musical-theater dancer ... Her sparkling stage personality won her many fans." She was the first prima ballerina of the Radio City Music Hall when it opened in 1932, and is chiefly remembered for her work as a founding member of the American Ballet Theatre with whom she was a principal dancer from 1939 to 1941. Active as a performer in Broadway musicals from 1925 to 1944, her performance credits on the New York stage include: the George White's Scandals (1925-1927), the Ziegfeld Follies of 1934, Calling All Stars (1934-1935), Arthur Schwartz's Virginia (1937), and Fritz Kreisler's Rhapsody (1944). In 1942 she portrayed the Sorceress of the North (a.k.a. Glinda the Good Witch) in the first stage adaptation of the 1939 movie musical The Wizard of Oz at The MUNY. On television, she appeared in several very early broadcasts in 1931 and 1939, and later headlined her own program, The Patricia Bowman Show for CBS in 1951. She was the director of a ballet school in New York from 1957 to 1977; after which she lived in retirement in Las Vegas.

== Life and career ==
Born in Washington D.C., Bowman studied dance with various teachers in her native city, New York City, and in Europe. She started her dancing career as a teenager at a time when there were no major ballet companies in the United States, initially using her birth name, Edna Bowman, before transitioning to the stage name Patricia Bowman in 1927. Her first performances were in musical revues and in ornate live performances staged in movie palaces during the 1920s and 1930s. She made her Broadway debut in 1925 as Edna Bowman in George White's Scandals; also appearing in the 1926 and 1927 versions of that production. She joined the dance troupe of Vera Fokina, the wife of choreographer and dancer Michel Fokine, which was engaged for performances at the New York Hippodrome in 1926. She continued to tour periodically with the Fokine ballet in the late 1920s and 1930s. During this period she also worked as a ballroom dancer with Tony DeMarco, was a prima ballerina at the Roxy Theatre (1928–1932), and toured in vaudeville. One of her more well-known vaudeville works was Tennis, a humorous piece choreographed by Michel Fokine.

In 1932 Bowman was appointed the leading ballerina of the newly opened Radio City Music Hall; a theatre she continued to perform at into the early 1950s. In 1934 she starred in the Ziegfeld Follies with Fanny Brice, the Howard Brothers, Jane Froman, and Everett Marshall. In 1937 she returned to Broadway in Arthur Schwartz's Virginia, and in 1938 she toured as a prima ballerina with Mikhail Mordkin's dance troupe.

In 1939 Bowman became a founding member of the American Ballet Theatre (then called simply Ballet Theatre), which began its first season in January 1940. In the company's first season she danced the roles of Princess Odette (the White Swan) in Pyotr Ilyich Tchaikovsky's Swan Lake, the title role in Adolphe Adam's Giselle, and the role of Lisette in the United States premiere of La fille mal gardée. She also starred in Fokine's Les Sylphides; a work which she appeared in again with the company in 1955 as a guest artist opposite Erik Bruhn. In the summer following the ABT's first season she portrayed Cinderella in the premiere of Edward Eager's musical adaptation of the fairy tale, After the Ball, at the Clinton Playhouse in Connecticut.

Bowman left the American Ballet Theatre in 1941, after which she became the headline act at the Copacabana nightclub in Manhattan with singer Elvira Ríos. In the summer of 1942, she created the role of the Sorceress of the North, aka Glinda, at The Municipal Opera Association of St. Louis, in the first ever stage production of The Wizard of Oz to use the songs from the 1939 MGM film. Helen Raymond portrayed the Wicked Witch of the West, Evelyn Wyckoff played Dorothy Gale, Donald Burr played the Tin Man, Edmund Dorsey played the Cowardly Lion, Lee Dixon played the Scarecrow, and John Cherry played the Wizard of Oz. In 1944 she created the role of Ilse Bonen in the original Broadway cast of Fritz Kreisler's Rhapsody.

On screen, Bowman appeared in early television broadcasts in 1931 and 1939. She was a featured dancer in the 1937 film O-Kay for Sound. She made guest appearances on The Milton Berle Show, Cavalcade of Stars, The Ken Murray Show, and the Ford Star Revue. In 1951 she hosted her own television program, The Patricia Bowman Show, for CBS.

After retiring from performance, Bowman was the director of a ballet school in New York from 1957 to 1977. She married Albert Kaye in 1977, at which point she retired and relocated to Las Vegas. She lived there until her death in 1999.
