= Violante Camporesi =

Italian soprano (1785–1839)

Violante Camporesi Giustiniani
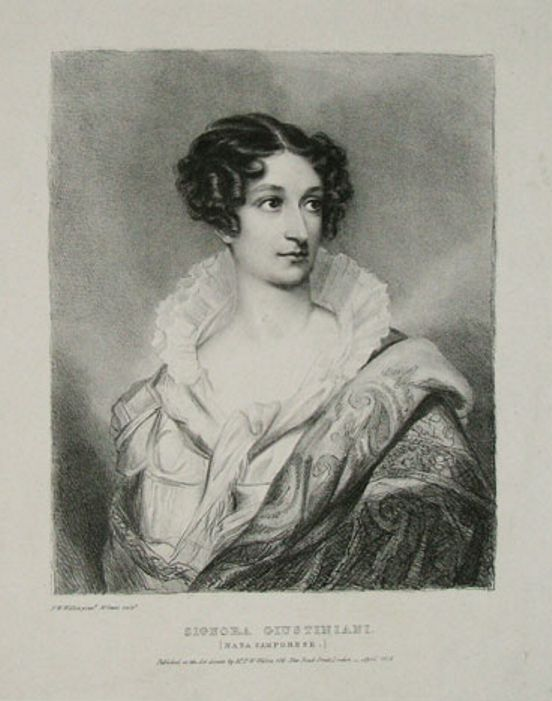
- Born: Violante Camporesi; 23 December 1785; Rome, Papal States (now Italy)
- Died: 1839; Rome, Papal States
- Occupation: Soprano

Violante Camporesi, or Camporese (23 December 1785 – 1839), was an Italian soprano.

== Life ==
Born in Rome in 1785, she was the daughter of an architect, Giulio, and Maddalena Belli. After marrying Giustiniani, she found herself in financial difficulties and therefore thought of dedicating herself to singing professionally.

She retired from active singing in 1829 and died in Rome in 1839.

== Musical career ==
Camporesi performed for the first time in public in 1809 singing arias in a concert in Rome, which were followed by numerous concerts that soon made her famous even outside Italy. She was hired for Napoleon's private concerts to perform in Paris. While in Paris, she trained with Girolamo Crescentini for quite some time to improve her vocal qualities.

The political events of those years forced her to leave the country to England where she debuted at Theatre Royal Haymarket on 11 January 1817 in Cimarosa's opera, Penelope. She made her debut at La Scala on 26 December 1818 as Sesto in Mozart's La clemenza di Tito.

Her noted performances includes Mozart's Don Giovanni, La clemenza di Tito, Le nozze di Figaro and Rossini's La gazza ladra, Otello, La donna del lago, Bianca e Falliero. She was a sought after and an acclaimed performer in London and La Scala.

After retiring in 1829, Camporesi participated in private concerts performing music by Boïeldieu and to Naples with Ferdinand Ries for musical entertainment.
