= John Wesley Van Dyke =

John Wesley Van Dyke (c. 1849–1939) was president of the Atlantic Refining Company, Philadelphia, Pennsylvania, from 1911 until 1927. After the break-up of Standard Oil Trust, Van Dyke led the debt-ridden Atlantic Refining Company into expanded markets and sales of more than $131 million.

== The early years ==
John Wesley Van Dyke was born in Franklin County, Pennsylvania in about 1849. In 1867, at the age of 17, young Van Dyke ran away from home to find a job in the western Pennsylvania oil fields. By the age of 21, he was a driller, tool dresser, and small producer, having purchased two oil leases in Venango County, Pennsylvania. Van Dyke was hired as an engineer by Standard Oil's Long Island Refinery in the mid-1870s. In 1879, Standard Oil purchased the Sone & Fleming Refinery in Brooklyn, New York and Van Dyke was made plant manager.

== Time With Standard Oil Trust ==
John Van Dyke was sent to Lima, Ohio in 1886 to manage the newly formed Solar Refinery. Charged with finding a way to remove the sulfur from Ohio’s crude oil, John D. Rockefeller teamed Van Dyke with German chemist, Herman Frasch. Frasch successfully devised the necessary chemistry while Van Dyke invented a hollow water-cooled drive shaft for the furnace employed in the recovery of the copper oxide that was necessary to remove the sulfur from the crude oil.

Standard Oil transferred John Van Dyke to its Point Breeze Refinery in Philadelphia in 1903. Working together with William Irish, the two men developed the technology for the "tower still," which offered greater control over condensation during refining. This technique was considered the industry's first complete distillation process, saving millions of dollars annually in refining costs.

== Designer of Railroad Tank Cars ==
In 1902, John Van Dyke was tasked with designing an improved railroad tank car for Standard Oil's tank car operating unit, Union Tank Line (UTL). His design, patented September 8, 1903, (US 738259) was for an all steel car without a conventional frame, or center sill. This so-called V-car was thoroughly tested by UTL and its design approved by the (Railroad) Master Car Builders’ Association. However, it was considered radical and was not well received by the railroad industry. Few were built. Sources vary as to the actual number, from as few as "about one hundred" to as many as two thousand.

In response to the V-car's poor acceptance, UTL asked John Van Dyke to design a tank car along more conventional lines. This car, later known as the X-car, was patented August 30, 1904 (US 768888). It had a substantial center sill incorporating an anchor, securely riveted to the tank and to the center sill, to prevent the tank from shifting longitudinally in the event of a wreck. The X-car was a success and was built by the thousands for a period of at least ten years.

== Time With Atlantic Refining ==
When the Sherman Antitrust Act broke up Standard Oil Trust in 1911, John Van Dyke became president of the Atlantic Refining Company. Without the huge integrated operation of the former parent company, Atlantic Refining faced many challenges. The company owned three refineries in Philadelphia, Pittsburgh, and Franklin, Pennsylvania. Its domestic markets were confined to the states of Delaware and Pennsylvania. The company did not own or lease any oil wells, pipe lines, or oil tankers, and though sixty per cent of its business was foreign, it had no foreign sales force; it was several million dollars in debt to its former associates.

Van Dyke developed a business plan to expand Atlantic's domestic and foreign markets, but domestic sales came to a halt when the U.S. entered World War I in April 1917. Prior to U.S. involvement in the war, gasoline exports increased to the Allied Forces. As air forces emerged, the demand for aviation grade gasoline grew, and during the time of the U.S. involvement in World War I, fifty percent of the aviation fuel sent abroad was produced at Atlantic's Point Breeze Refinery.

After the war, Van Dyke returned to his business plan for expansion. In response to changes in the source areas of crude oil, he focused on building up the fleet of oil tanker ships owned by the company. A second strategy was to produce oil, rather than rely on purchased crude. By the mid-1930s, Atlantic was producing oil in Kansas, Texas, Oklahoma, and New Mexico from more than 1,000 domestic oil wells.

Atlantic's expansion of foreign markets began with the opening of the company's first foreign office in Paris in the spring of 1919. Six months later, a branch was opened in Italy. In 1923, the company entered the South African market, and by the following year had offices in all of Western Europe, on the north, west and south coasts of Africa, and in South America. In 1926, in partnership with Union Oil Company of California, the company began business in Australia.

== Van Dyke's Legacy ==
John Van Dyke retired as president of the Atlantic Refining Company in 1927, at which time he became chairman of the board. Prior to the Great Depression, a boom period occurred and Van Dyke took an unpopular stance in restraining Atlantic's growth. Although employee hours were cut, wages were maintained, and the company met all of its obligations, and continued its dividends.

On November 20, 1937, an 18,500 ton, welded oil tanker, (the first American-built turbo-electric tanker), was launched at Chester, Pennsylvania, bearing the name of "J.W. Van Dyke."

Having returned to Philadelphia in poor health from a trip to Brazil, Van Dyke died at the age of 89, in September 1939. Van Dyke's will created an educational endowment fund for the children of the Atlantic's employees in the amount of $1.5 million.

In 1966, Atlantic Refining merged with the Richfield Oil Company of California creating the Atlantic Richfield Company, (ARCO).
