= Armand Tokatyan =

Armenian operatic tenor

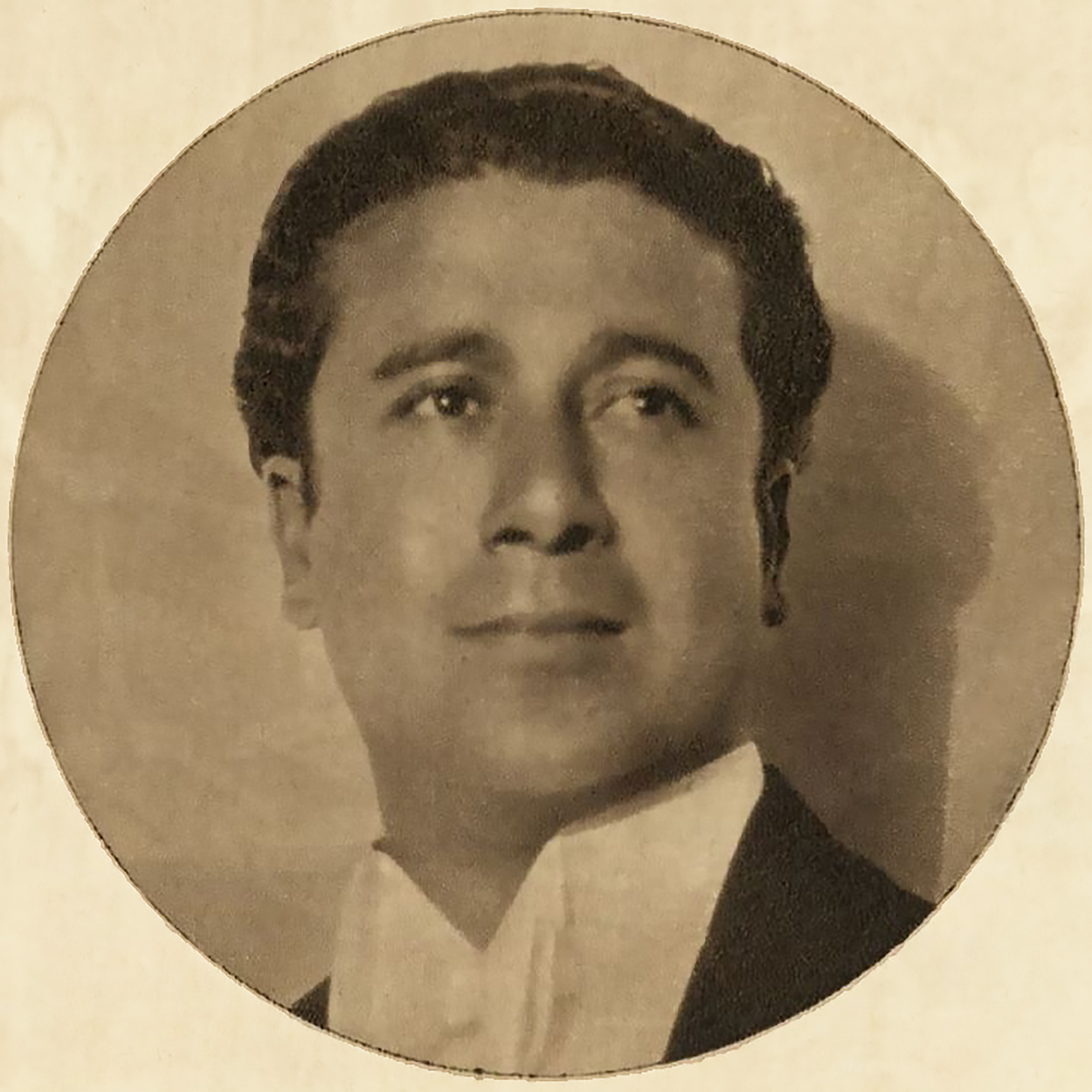
Armand Tokatyan

Armand Tokatyan (Armenian: Արման Թոքաթյան; Bulgarian: Арман Токатян; June 16, 1894 – June 12, 1960) was an operatic tenor. An Armenian born in Plovdiv, Bulgaria, he travelled to Egypt with his parents where he sang in cafés to a favorable response. He was then sent to Paris to study tailoring, but instead sang in Left Bank cafés. In 1914, he returned to Egypt and earned his living by again singing in the cafés. He took up operetta, soon becoming a matinee idol, then in 1919 went to Milan to pursue an opera career. His operatic debut was in 1921 at the Teatro Dal Verme in Puccini's Manon Lescaut. With the help of Italian conductor Giuseppe Bamboschek, he joined the touring Scotti Opera Company in the United States, and was soon noticed by the Metropolitan Opera where he debuted in 1923. For many years he performed there and at many other opera houses in the US and Europe. He was proficient in numerous languages. Many recordings were made of his performances.

Dorothy Kirsten in her autobiography writes the following about Tokatyan:

I recall how grateful I was to have him as a partner for my first performance of [La Traviata] at the Met because there had been no orchestra rehearsal. Tokatyan afforded me a sense of security, having sung Alfredo innumerable times in that theatre. His authority onstage and his ingratiating manner made me very comfortable. He seemed to be just right for the role. As Alfredo his noble appearance helped me create the illusion that I was desperately in love with him.

Tokatyan died in Pasadena, CA of a heart attack on June 12, 1960.

== CD recordings ==
- Lebendige Vergangenheit - Armand Tokatyan
