= Teresa Strinasacchi =

Italian opera singer (1768–1838)

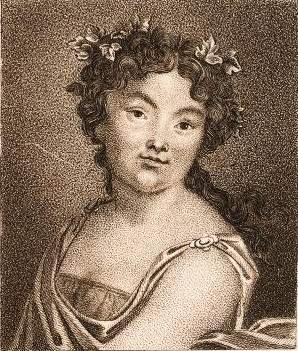
Teresa Strinasacchi

Teresa Strinasacchi (1768–1838) was an Italian opera singer. She was engaged in the Divadlo v Kotcích in 1793–1797, where she was the prima donna at the time.
