= Martha Lipton =

American opera singer

Martha Lipton (April 6, 1913 – November 28, 2006) was an American operatic mezzo-soprano and music educator who is best known for her career performing at the Metropolitan Opera ("The Met") from 1944 to 1961. A native of New York City, she began her training as a vocalist with her mother who had a brief career as a concert soprano under the name Estelle Laiken. She later studied both privately and at the School of Musicianship for Singers, Inc and the Juilliard School. She made her professional concert debut while still a student in 1933 at Carnegie Hall, performing in a concert of light opera excerpts with the New York Light Opera Guild. In 1936 she began working as a church vocalist at both Riverside Church and Temple Emanu-El of New York.

While studying in the graduate school of Juilliard from 1937 to 1939, Lipton began her opera career as a contract member of the resident opera company at Radio City Music Hall (RCMH), making her professional opera debut as Alisa in Lucia di Lammermoor on November 6, 1938, at the RCMH. In 1939 she created the role of Queen Isabella in the world premiere of Eugene Zador's opera Christopher Columbus with the RCMH Opera Company. That same year she won two singing competitions, one by the MacDowell Club of New York and the other a national competition by the National Federation of Music Clubs, which significantly raised her profile as a vocalist. Contracts for recitals and concert work with symphony orchestras on the national stage soon followed, including performances with the Boston Symphony Orchestra, Pittsburgh Symphony Orchestra, Portland Symphony Orchestra, Indianapolis Symphony Orchestra, and Milwaukee Symphony Orchestra among others.

In 1941 Lipton performed the role of the Lady-in-Waiting in the United States premiere of Giuseppe Verdi's 1865 version of Macbeth at Broadway's 44th Street Theatre. In 1944 she performed in the New York City Opera's first season as Nancy in Friedrich von Flotow's Martha. That same year she made her debut at The Met as Siebel in Charles Gounod's Faust. She went on to sing in seventeen seasons at the Met, giving more than 400 performances with the company and portraying a total of 36 different characters. She notably appeared as Mrs. Sedley in the Met's first staging of Benjamin Britten's Peter Grimes in 1948, and performed the role of Mother Goose in the United States premiere of Igor Stravinsky's The Rake's Progress in 1953. Her most frequently performed roles at the Met were Annina in Richard Strauss's Der Rosenkavalier and Emilia in Verdi's Otello. She mainly retired from performance after completing the 1960–1961 season at the Met.

On the international stage, Lipton made appearances as a guest artist in opera houses in Mexico, Brazil, Holland, and the United Kingdom. She also gave a concert tour of South America in 1946. She created roles in the world premieres of two operas by Douglas Moore: Augusta Tabor in The Ballad of Baby Doe (1956) and Aunt Maud in The Wings of the Dove (1961). She made multiple recording with Columbia Records during the 1950s and into 1960s, including records made with Eugene Ormandy and the Philadelphia Orchestra; the New York Philharmonic under conductors Leopold Stokowski, Bruno Walter, and Leonard Bernstein; and multiple complete opera recordings with the Metropolitan Opera.

Lipton was a voice teacher on the faculty of the Jacobs School of Music at Indiana University in Bloomington, Indiana from 1960 until her retirement in 1983. Having never married, she died in Bloomington in 2006 at the age of 93.

== Early life and education ==
The daughter of Leon Lipton and Estelle Lipton (née Laiken), Martha Lipton was born in New York City on April 6, 1913. Her mother had a short career as a concert soprano under the name Estelle Laiken. Her first voice lessons were taught to her by her mother.

Lipton trained further in New York under Anna E. Ziegler at the School of Musicianship for Singers, Inc in the early 1930s. On December 15, 1933, she made her debut at Carnegie Hall as a member of the New York Light Opera Guild, performing as a soloist in a concert of operetta music by Reginald De Koven. After this she studied privately in New York in the studio of Melanie Guttman-Rice in 1936–1937. In 1936 she was engaged as a resident soloist at both Riverside Church and Temple Emanu-El of New York, and in 1937 she made her radio debut on NBC Radio's "Magic Keys" program after being selected to perform by Walter Damrosch.

Lipton won a scholarship to the graduate school of the Juilliard School in November 1937. There she studied singing with tenor Paul Reimers. She performed in a Juilliard concert of opera excerpts directed by Alberto Bimboni on April 22, 1938. In early January 1939 she won the singing competition of the MacDowell Club of New York. This led to her New York City recital debut at the concert hall of the MacDowell Club on January 26, 1939. In April 1939 she performed the role of the Sorceress in Juilliard's production of Henry Purcell's Dido and Aeneas with Margaret Harshaw as Dido and Albert Stoessel as the music director. After graduating from Juilliard, she continued to study singing in New York with Ettore Verna.

In May 1939 Lipton won first prize in the national level of the singing competition of the National Federation of Music Clubs (NFMC). In addition to the cash prize, the competition win led to a her performing as a soloist in a concert broadcast on national radio with her singing with a 70 piece orchestra under conductor Alfred Wallenstein. The NFMC competition win significantly raised her profile as a singer, and helped her earn professional contracts nationally at the beginning of her career.

== Early career ==
While studying at Juilliard, Lipton began her opera career at Radio City Music Hall as a contract member of that theatre's resident opera company. She made several appearances in operas with conductor Ernö Rapée and the symphony orchestra of Radio City Music Hall (RCMH) which were recorded for live broadcast on the NBC Blue Network radio program "Radio City Music Hall of the Air"; a radio program that aired lived shows from the RCMH stage on Sunday afternoons with an audience also in the theatre. These included performing the roles of Alisa in Lucia di Lammermoor (November 6, 1938), Lucia in Cavalleria rusticana (November 13, 1938), and Maddalena in Rigoletto (November 20, 1938). On October 8, 1939, she performed the role of Queen Isabella in the world premiere of Eugene Zador's opera Christopher Columbus at the Center Theatre which was presented in a concert version by the RCMH Opera Company and also broadcast on the "Radio City Music Hall of the Air".

In December 1939 Lipton was a guest soloist with the Portland Symphony Orchestra in which she sang Wolfgang Amadeus Mozart's "Allelujah" from his Exsultate, jubilate and the arias "Che farò senza Euridice" from Christoph Willibald Gluck's Orfeo ed Euridice and "Amour! viens aider ma faiblesse" from Camille Saint-Saëns's Samson and Delilah. In February 1940 she appeared at the 92nd Street Y as a soloist in Sergei Rachmaninoff's Springtide and Saint-Saëns's Le Déluge with the Jewish Choral Society of New York and conductor Abraham Binder, and that same month performed a series of vocal duets by Johannes Brahms at The Town Hall with soprano Mabel Berryman. In April 1940 she was a soloist in Giuseppe Verdi's Requiem with soprano Zinka Milanov, conductor Fritz Reiner, and the Pittsburgh Symphony Orchestra. This was soon followed by engagements as a soloist in two different concerts with the Milwaukee Symphony Orchestra.

In March 1941 Lipton gave a recital at The Town Hall. In November 1942 she returned to that theatre to perform in a concert of vocal quartets by Joseph Haydn with her fellow soloists including soprano Margaret Daum, tenor Earl Rogers, and bass Edward Constantin. She joined the roster of principal arts of the New Opera Company (NOC) in Manhattan, making her debut with the company on October 18, 1941, as Dorabella in Mozart's Così fan tutte at Broadway's 44th Street Theatre. Later that season she performed two more roles at the same theatre with the NOC; Pauline in Tchaikovsky's The Queen of Spades and the Lady-in-Waiting in the United States premiere of Verdi's 1865 version of Macbeth. On May 3, 1942, she performed in concert with soprano Grace Moore and the Indianapolis Symphony Orchestra on the campus of Purdue University with that school's choir. Later that year she performed in concerts at military bases in New York state to entertain troops serving during World War II, and continued to perform in concerts organized by the United Service Organizations in 1943.

In 1943 Lipton was made a national honorary member of the professional music fraternity Delta Omicron, and sang in concert with the Memphis Symphony. In May 1943 performed the role of Lola in Cavalleria rusticana at the Center Theatre in Manhattan with the San Carlo Opera Company. In July 1943 she performed in a series of concerts at Meridian Hill Park in Washington D.C. with baritone Conrad Thibault. On August 31, 1943, she gave a joint recital with Alexander Kipnis in Halifax, Nova Scotia, and in October 1943 she gave a recital at Westminster College in Pennsylvania. The following November she gave a recital in Dallas.

Lipton appeared in the very first season of the New York City Opera as Nancy in Friedrich von Flotow's Martha; portraying that role for her debut with the company on February 25, 1944, with Mary Martha Briney in the title role. She continued to appear with the company in that role into early March 1944. On March 26, 1944, she appeared with the Handel and Haydn Society and the Boston Symphony Orchestra under the baton of Julius Theodorowicz at Jordan Hall, New England Conservatory as a soloist in Johann Sebastian Bach's St Matthew Passion. In May 1934 she returned to The Town Hall as a soloist in Felix Mendelssohn's Elijah with John Gurney in the title role. She gave recitals at Columbia University (March 1934) and the University of Toronto (October 1944, with John Brownlee).

== Metropolitan Opera ==
Lipton made her debut at the Metropolitan Opera ("The Met") on November 28, 1944, as Siebel in Charles Gounod's Faust with Ezio Pinza as Méphistophélès, Licia Albanese as Margherite, and Raoul Jobin in the title role. It was also the first performance given during the Met's 1944–1945 season. She toured with the company the following month to perform the same opera at the Academy of Music in Philadelphia. By the time she ended her singing career at the Met in 1961 she had performed a total of 401 times with the company across seventeen seasons in a total of 36 different characters. She later returned for a final 402nd appearance on the Met stage on October 22, 1983, at a Centennial Gala at which she was an honoree.

Lipton's most frequent assignments at the Met were as Annina in Der Rosenkavalier and Emilia in Otello. In 1948 she performed as Mrs. Sedley in the Met's first staging of Benjamin Britten's Peter Grimes. In 1953 she portrayed Mother Goose in the United States premiere of Igor Stravinsky's The Rake's Progress. In 1957 she performed the role of Madame Larina in Peter Brook's staging of Eugene Onegin. Other roles in her Met repertoire included Amneris in Aida, Countess Waldner in Arabella, both Floßhilde and Fricka in Das Rheingold, a Genii in The Magic Flute, Hansel in Hansel and Gretel, La Cieca in La Gioconda, Lola in Cavalleria rusticana, Maddalena in Rigoletto, Mercedes in Carmen, and the Nurse in Boris Godunov. Her final appearance at the Met was as the Innkeeper in Boris Godunov on January 7, 1961, with George London in the title role.

In addition to her work on the stage of the Met, Lipton also made radio appearances and sang in concerts associated with the Met in other locations. On December 26, 1944, she sang a program of music with Met tenor Richard Manning on the radio program "Metropolitan Opera, USA" on WQXR; a radio program organized by the Metropolitan Opera Guild which featured American singers under contract with the Met. In April 1945 she performed at a concert organized by the Met at the Public Auditorium in Cleveland, Ohio in which she performed works form The Marriage of Figaro with Frances Greer and Hugh Thompson, and sang the duet "L'amo come il fulgor del creato" from La Gioconda with Frances Greer. The Cleveland Orchestra was the ensemble for that concert with Wilfrid Pelletier leading the musical forces before an audience of 9,000 people.

On February 16, 1946, Lipton performed on the radio program "Opera News of the Air" with fellow Met singer Lucrezia Bori and Met conductor Boris Goldovsky. In May 1946 she toured with the Met to the Kiel Opera House in St. Louise where she starred in a production of Rigoletto with Patrice Munsel and Ezio Pinza.

When the final concert was given at The Old Met on April 16, 1966, Lipton was in attendance as an official guest of honor.

== International appearances ==
Lipton made her debut at the Palacio de Bellas Artes in Mexico City in 1945 as Delilah in Camille Saint-Saëns's Samson and Delilah with Ramón Vinay as Samson. In the summer of 1946 she was committed to the Theatro Municipal in Rio de Janeiro where she starred as Octavian in Der Rosenkavalier with Mimi Benzell as Sophie, and as Preziosilla in La forza del destino with Zinka Milanov as Leonora, Kurt Baum as Don Alvaro, Glno Bech as Don Carlo, Giacomo Vaghi as the Marchese di Calatrava, and Tino Cremagnani conducting. This was immediately followed by a concert tour of South America; which included a performance with the Brazilian Symphony Orchestra under conductor Eugen Szenkar. She later returned to the Theatro Municipal in 1950.

Lipton also sang in Europe. In 1951 she performed the role of Ulrica in Un ballo in maschera for her debut at the Holland Festival. She returned to that festival again in 1952 and 1953. She sang the title role in Benjamin Britten's The Rape of Lucretia for the English Opera Group in 1954.

== Other work ==
In the 1945–1946 academic year, Lipton was a guest artist / teacher in the Lyceum Course at Brigham Young University. In February 1945 she was one of several featured singers in a concert organized by William Colston Leigh Sr. at Carnegie Hall that was hosted by Lawrence Tibbett. In the summer of 1945 she performed in concert with conductor Rudolph Ringwall and the Cleveland Pops Orchestra in a program that included duets with tenor Robert Marshall.

In January 1946 Lipton sang at Times Hall in New York City in a concert of Jewish religious music in the Hebrew language under conductor Max Helfman that was sponsored by the Hebrew Arts Committee. In April 1946 she gave a recital at Assumption College in Ontario. In May 1946 she was a soloist in Ludwig van Beethoven's Symphony No. 9 with soprano Rosa Canario, tenor William Hain, bass Nicola Moscona, conductor Fritz Reiner, and the Pittsburgh Symphony Orchestra. In December 1946, Lipton was a guest soloist in Wayne State University's performance of George Frideric Handel's Messiah with her fellow soloists including Met singers Richard Bonelli and Donald Dame.

On February 2, 1947, Lipton performed Modest Mussorgsky's song cycle The Nursery in a concert at The Town Hall. On April 20, 1947, she performed as a soloist with conductor John Warren Erb and a chorus of 500 voices in a concert given at the Metropolitan United Methodist Church in Detroit as a part of the national convention of the National Federation of Music Clubs.

On October 27, 1949, she made her debut with the New York Philharmonic (NYP) at Carnegie Hall, performing Arnold Schoenberg's "Song of the Wood Dove" ("Lied der Waltaube") from Gurre-Lieder under conductor Leopold Stokowski. She appeared with the NYP in a total of 27 concerts during her career, with her final performance with the orchestra being in a memorial concert for Dimitri Mitropoulos at Carnegie Hall on April 2, 1961 in which she was a soloist in Gustav Mahler's Symphony No. 3 under conductor Leonard Bernstein. In 1957 she performed Brahm's Alto Rhapsody with the NYP under Albert Fracht.

In 1951 Lipton was the soloist in Charles Martin Loeffler's Canticle of the Sun in a concert conducted by Richard Korn at the City College of New York. In 1952 she gave another recital at The Town Hall, and that same year performed in the United States premiere of Hugo Wolf's opera Der Corregidor which was given in a concert version at Carnegie Hall.

In 1956 Lipton made her debut at the Lyric Opera of Chicago as Herodias in Salome. On July 7, 1956, Lipton portrayed the role of Augusta Tabor in the world premiere of Douglas Moore's The Ballad of Baby Doe at the Central City Opera; a role she repeated that same year at the New York City Opera (NYCO). She later starred in another world premiere of an opera by Moore; portraying Aunt Maud in the original production of The Wings of the Dove with the NYCO at New York City Center on October 12, 1961

Lipton was active during the 1950s as a recording artist for Columbia Records. Her recordings with Columbia included Mahler's Third Symphony, featuring Leonard Bernstein leading the New York Philharmonic and Bruckner's Te Deum led by Bruno Walter. With Aaron Copland on piano, she recorded Copland's Twelve Poems of Emily Dickinson. One of her best known recordings was Handel's Messiah with Eugene Ormandy and the Philadelphia Orchestra and the Mormon Tabernacle Choir. She also participated in Ormandy's complete recording of Die Fledermaus singing the role of Prince Orlofsky.

== Later life ==
Lipton became a professor of voice at Indiana University in 1960. While serving as a professor, she also performed in many Indiana University opera productions. Most notably, Lipton played the role of Amneris from Giuseppe Verdi's opera Aida in IU's outdoor stage production at Memorial Stadium in July and August 1963. In 1983, Lipton officially retired from teaching with the rank of professor emeritus. She continued to teach part-time until her death.

Lipton died in Bloomington, Indiana, on November 28, 2006. She was 93.

== Partial list of recordings ==
- 1945, original release by RCA Victor (re-released by Columbia Records in 1949); Act III of Richard Wagner's Die Walküre, New York Philharmonic, Chorus of the Metropolitan Opera, conductor Artur Rodziński; Lipton sings the role of Grimgerde with Helen Traubel as Brünnhilde and Herbert Janssen as Wotan
- 1950, Columbia Records: Arnold Schoenberg's "Lied der Waltaube") from Gurre-Lieder, New York Philharmonic, conductor Leopold Stokowski; Lipton as soloist
- 1950, Columbia Records: Johann Strauss II's Die Fledermaus, Chorus and Orchestra of the Metropolitan Opera, conductor Eugene Ormandy; with Lipton as Prince Orlofsky, Lily Pons as Adele, Ljuba Welitsch as Rosalinda, Richard Tucker as Alfred, Charles Kullman as Einstein, and John Brownlee as Dr. Falke
- 1953, Columbia Records; Igor Stravinsky's The Rake's Progress, Chorus and Orchestra of the Metropolitan Opera, conductor Fritz Reiner; with Lipton as Mother Goose, Eugene Conley as Tom Rakewell, Hilde Güden as Anne Trulove, Mack Harrell as Nick Shadow, and Blanche Thebom as Baba the Turk
- 1953, Columbia Records; Ludwig van Beethoven's Symphony No. 9, Westminster Choir, New York Philharmonic, conductor Bruno Walter; with soloists Martha Lipton, Frances Yeend, David Lloyd], and Mack Harrell
- 1957, Columbia Records; Umberto Giordano's Andrea Chénier with Lipton as the Countess di Coigny, Richard Tucker in the title role, Mary Curtis-Verna as Maddalena di Coigny, Mario Sereni as Carlo Gérard, Rosalind Elias as Bersi, George Cehanovsky as Pietro Fléville, Gabor Carelli as The Abbé, and Alessio De Paolis as The Spy.
- 1959, Columbia Records; George Frideric Handel's Messiah, Mormon Tabernacle Choir, Philadelphia Orchestra, conductor Eugene Ormandy; with soloists Martha Lipton, Eileen Farrell, Davis Cunningham, and William Warfield
- 1965, Columbia Records (recorded April 3, 1961); Gustav Mahler's Symphony No. 3, Women's Chorus of The Schola Cantorum, Boys' Choir of The Church of The Transfiguration, New York Philharmonic, conductor Leonard Bernstein; Martha Lipton as soloist
