= Josepha Chekova =

Czech-American soprano

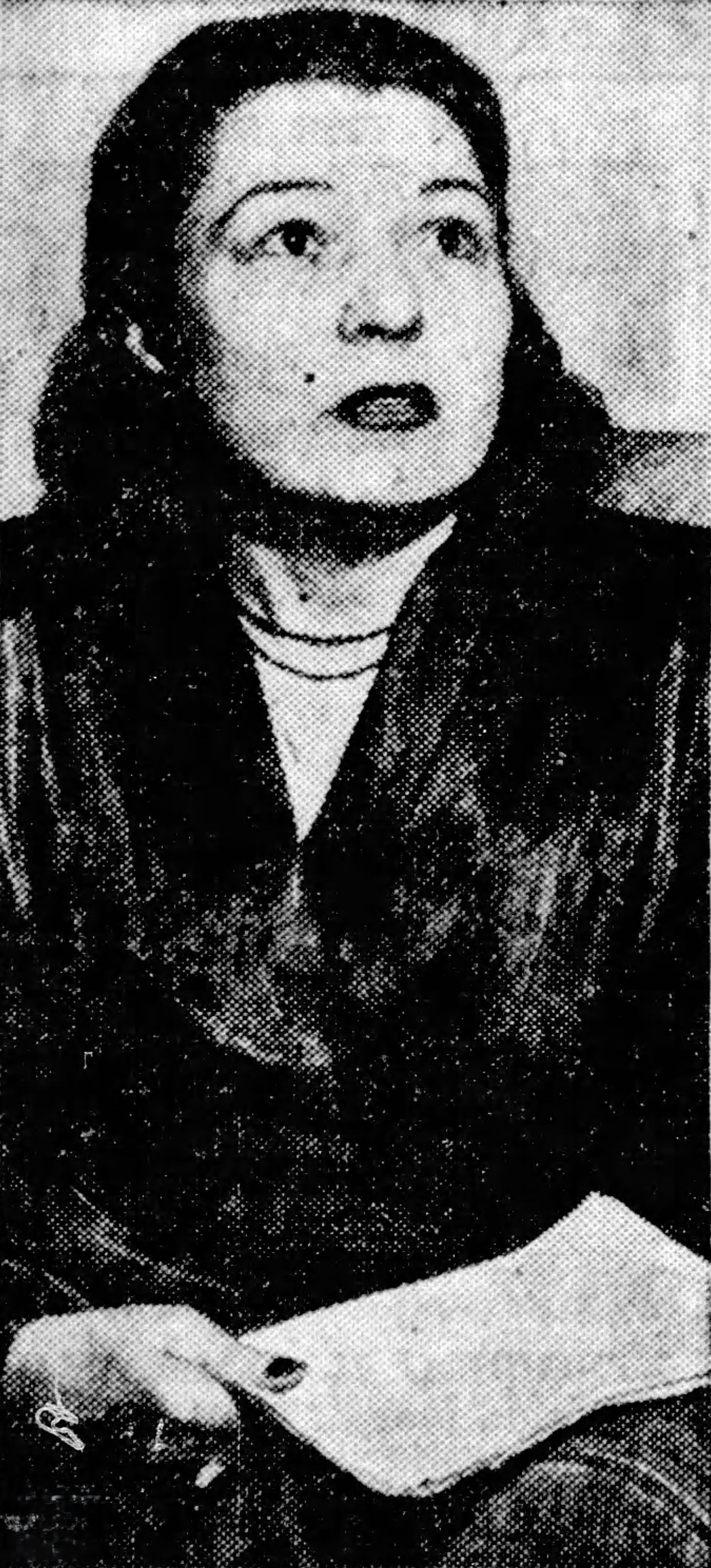
Chekova in 1948

Josepha Chekova, sometimes given as Josefa Chekova and also known by her married name Josepha Domansky, (26 May 1900 – 25 February 1968) was a Czech-American soprano. She began her career in vaudeville as early as 1924, and was a contracted singer with WRNY radio in 1926–1927. After appearing in a musical revue in Chicago, she won a vocal competition in 1927 which provided her with a scholarship to train as an opera singer at the Bel Canto Studio, Inc. of New York. She later studied singing further in New York City with Estelle Liebling. She made her opera debut at the Prague State Opera prior to becoming a leading soprano with the New York Opera Company in 1933. She was a leading soprano at Radio City Music Hall in 1930s, and toured with the San Carlo Opera Company in 1935–1936. She worked regularly with the Steel Pier Opera Company in Atlantic City from the mid 1930s into the early 1940s, and also appeared as a guest artist with opera companies in Washington D.C., Cincinnati, and Chicago. From 1940 to 1942 she toured with Armand Bagarozy's Columbia Opera Company, and in 1948 she gave a concert tour of Czechoslovakia.

In addition to her work as a soprano, Chekova also translated opera libretti into English. She notably translated Eugene Zador's opera Christopher Columbus from German into English for the work's world premiere in 1939. Her English language translation was later used by the American Symphony Orchestra for their 1975 recording of that work.

== Vocal training and career ==
The daughter of Czech immigrants to the United States, Josepha Chekova was born on 26 May 1900 in New York City.

She was performing in vaudeville as early as May 1925 at Keith's Theatre in Syracuse, New York. and the Strand Theatre in Shenandoah, Pennsylvania. She sang several programs of music on WRNY in 1926–1927. She later was engaged by Thomas A. Edison's music company to perform a program of Czech music on WRNY in June 1928 with the Edison Orchestra.

In May 1927 Chekova performed in the variety show Oh, Teacher at the Oriental Theatre in Chicago. The following October she won a singing competition held by the Bel Canto Studio, Inc. of New York; the prize of which was free vocal training for at least one year, and possibly as long as three years, and a trip to Italy. She later studied singing with Estelle Liebling in New York City. In 1929 she recorded the duet "Love Me Tonight" for the Victor Talking Machine Company with singer Dennis King.

Chekova had a minor part in the ensemble of the 1931 Broadway revival of John N. Raphael and Constance Collier's Peter Ibbetson at the Shubert Theatre. She made her professional opera debut with the Prague State Opera in The Bartered Bride. In 1933 she was a leading soprano with the New York Opera Company.

In 1934 Chekova was engaged at Radio City Music Hall (RCMH) where she sang works by Rudolf Friml is a stage show that also featured The Rockettes. She also performed the title role in Giacomo Puccini's Madama Butterfly at the RCMH in May 1934 with Edwina Eustis as Suzuki and Alfredo Gandolfi as Sharpless. In 1935 she performed the role of Musetta in Puccini's La bohème at the RCMH under conductor Ernö Rapée; a performance which was recorded live for a broadcast on NBC Radio. That same year she portrayed the title role Georges Bizet's Carmen and the role of Leonora in Giuseppe Verdi's Il trovatore at the Steel Pier Theatre in Atlantic City.

Chekova was engaged with the touring San Carlo Opera Company for the 1935–1936 season in which she performed the role of Nedda in Pagliacci, Marguerite in Faust and Micaëla in Carmen.

In 1936 Chekova performed at Aeolian Hall in a program of music by composer Elmo Russ. In 1937 she starred in a production of Benjamin Godard's La Vivandière at the Robin Hood Dell in Philadelphia. Staged by H. Maurice Jacquet's short lived American Opera Company, the opera was also performed in Trenton, New Jersey.

In 1939 Chekova portrayed Leonora in Il trovatore opposite Florence Foster Jenkins as Azucena with the Verdi Club in New York City, and returned to the RCMH as Musetta.

Chekova translated the original German language libretto to Eugene Zador's opera Christopher Columbus (1939) into English, and it is her translation of the libretto that was used when the work was given its world premiere on October 8, 1939 in a concert version of the work at the Center Theatre with Robert Weede in the title role. It was performed not only for a live radio broadcast on the NBC Blue Network program Music Hall of the Air but also in front of a sold out audience at the theatre. Her translation was later recorded by the American Symphony Orchestra under conductor Laszlo Halasz in 1975. It was released by the Cambria record label in 1997. Her translation was also used with the Tucson Symphony Orchestra performed the opera in 1956.

From 1940 to 1942 Chekova was a leading soprano with Armand Bagarozy's touring Columbia Opera Company. In 1941 she portrayed Mimi in La bohème with Rochester Grand Opera Company. The same year she returned to the RCMH to once again perform the role of Cio-Cio-San in Madama Butterfly. She gave a concert tour of Czechoslovakia in 1948 and was in the nation when the 1948 Czechoslovak coup d'état occurred. She wrote about her experience during this event in the Victoria Daily Times on March 10, 1948.

In 1955 she recorded the duet "Dio Ti Giocondi" from Verdi's Otello with tenor Mario Lanza. That recording was used in the soundtrack for the 1956 film Serenade.

== Later life ==
Josepha Chekova died at Christian Science Hospital in Boston at the age of 68 on 25 February 1968. Her husband, the concert manager Vladimir Domansky, had died a month earlier on 14 January 1968.
