= Jan Peerce =

American opera singer (1904–1984)

External audio
- You may hear Jan Peerce as Don José in Georges Bizet's opera Carmen with Fritz Reiner conducting the RCA Victor Orchestra and Rise Stevens, Robert Merrill and Licia Albanese in 1951 Here on archive.org

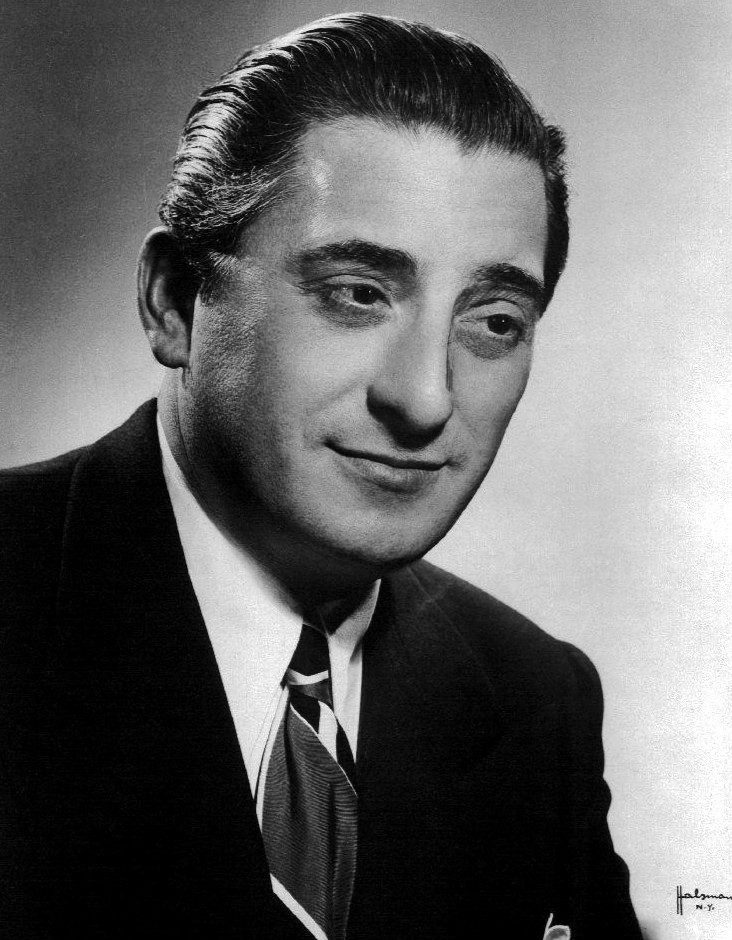
Jan Peerce in 1953

Jan Peerce (born Yehoshua Pinkhes Perelmuth; June 3, 1904 – December 15, 1984) was an American operatic tenor. Peerce was an accomplished performer on the operatic and Broadway concert stages, in solo recitals, and as a recording artist. He is the father of film director Larry Peerce.

== Family life ==
Jan Peerce was born Jacob Pincus Perelmuth (though his Hebrew gravestone gives his first name as יהושע, or Joshua, not Jacob), to a Jewish family. His parents, Levi (anglicized to Louis) and Henya Perelmuth, came from the village of Horodetz, formerly in Poland, now Belarus. Their first child, a daughter, died in an epidemic. In 1903 they emigrated to America along with their second child, a boy named Mottel. A year later, on June 3, 1904, their third child, Jacob Pincus, was born in a cold water flat on the Lower East Side of Manhattan, New York. He was nicknamed "Pinky" by his neighborhood friends. When he was three years old, his older brother Mottel was killed in an accident as the boy hitched a ride on an ice wagon. Jacob attended DeWitt Clinton High School and Columbia University. At his mother's urging he took violin lessons, and gave public performances, including dance band work as Jack "Pinky" Pearl. Sometimes he also sang and it was soon discovered he was an exceptional lyric tenor.

Peerce became the brother-in-law of fellow American tenor Richard Tucker when Sara Perelmuth, Peerce’s only surviving sister, married Tucker, who was then a part-time cantor, in 1936. While Peerce introduced Tucker to vocal coaches, and Tucker and Sara were living with Peerce's parents when Peerce made his debut with "The Met", Peerce tried to discourage Tucker's operatic ambitions. Ultimately their operatic competition led to familial estrangement lasting until Tucker's untimely death in 1975.

Jan remained on the Lower East Side until his 1930 marriage to Alice Kalmanovitz (1907–1994), a childhood friend to whom he was married for 54 years, until his death. He died at his home in New Rochelle, New York on December 15, 1984 at the age of 80. Peerce is interred at Mount Eden Cemetery in Valhalla, Westchester County.

== Career ==
Peerce studied singing in New York City with Giuseppe Boghetti. In 1932 he was hired as a tenor soloist with the Radio City Music Hall company by the impresario Roxy, who renamed him John Pierce. They soon compromised on the spelling Jan Peerce, which the singer felt better reflected his ethnicity. Thanks to radio broadcasts on the Radio City Music Hall of the Air and stage programs, Peerce soon had a nationwide following. The legendary maestro Arturo Toscanini heard him singing Wagner on the radio and was able to contact Peerce through a mutual friend to see if he would like to audition for him. Toscanini found him to be the tenor he had sought to sing operatic and choral works with the NBC Symphony Orchestra. The recordings made during, or following, the NBC broadcasts are among the outstanding musical legacies of the mid-20th century. Toscanini was reportedly pleased with Peerce's professionalism, as well as his musical talents and his unusually native-sounding pronunciation of Italian; many have said that Peerce was Toscanini's "favorite tenor" during the Maestro's 17 years at NBC. Peerce recalled that Toscanini never lost his temper with him the way he famously did with other musicians, even though Peerce believed he had the right to, on a few occasions. Peerce first sang publicly with Toscanini on February 6, 1938, in Carnegie Hall in an NBC broadcast performance of Beethoven's Ninth Symphony; the soloists also included soprano Vina Bovy, mezzo-soprano Kerstin Thorborg, and bass Ezio Pinza.

Peerce at an RCA Victor recording session, c. 1950

Peerce joined the roster of principal tenors at the Philadelphia La Scala Opera Company (PLSOC) in 1938. He made his professional opera debut with the company on December 10 of that year as the Duke of Mantua in Verdi's Rigoletto with Robert Weede in the title role and Fritz Mahler conducting. He also sang Alfredo in La traviata with Annunciata Garrotto as Violetta and Weede as Germont during the company's 1938-1939 season. Peerce sang in several more performance with the PLSOC through 1941, singing Pinkerton in Puccini's Madama Butterfly with Elda Ercole as Cio-Cio-San, and reprising the roles of the Duke and Alfredo a number of times.

On October 8, 1939, Peerce created the role of Diego Columbus in the world premiere of Eugene Zador's opera Christopher Columbus at the Center Theatre. In November 1939, he performed his first solo recital

in New York City. He made his debut with the Metropolitan Opera on November 29, 1941, singing Alfredo in Verdi's La traviata. He sang also the parts of Cavaradossi in Puccini's Tosca, Rodolfo in La bohème, and in Gounod's Faust. He was hailed by critics as the "All-American successor to the 'greats' of opera's almost extinct 'Golden Age'."

In December 1943, Peerce appeared in the OWI film Hymn of the Nations with Toscanini, the NBC Symphony Orchestra, and the Westminster Choir in a performance of Verdi's then seldom-heard cantata. Filmed in NBC Studio 8-H, the soundtrack of the performance of Hymn of the Nations has been issued on LP and CD by RCA Victor, and the entire film has been released on video-cassette and DVD.

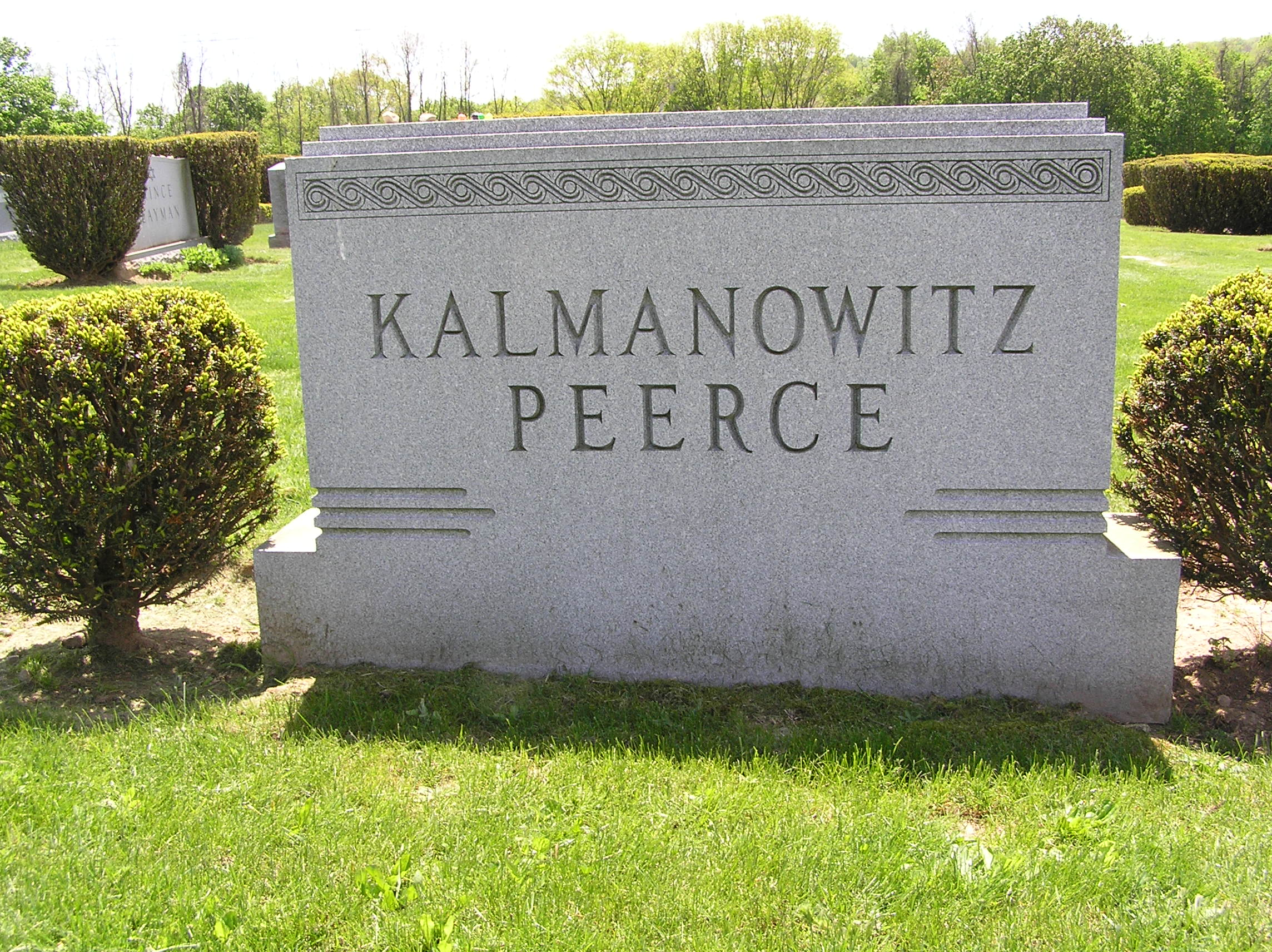
The headstone of Jan Peerce

During the 1950s Peerce performed regularly as a featured soloist before audiences of over 14,000 guests under the conductor Alfredo Antonini at the Lewisohn Stadium in New York City. These Italian Night open-air concerts featured the New York Philharmonic and the Lewisohn Stadium Orchestra along with such operatic luminaries as Richard Tucker, Robert Merrill, and Eileen Farrell.

In 1956 Peerce made a sensation in Moscow as a musical "cultural exchange" ambassador, being the first American to sing with the famed Bolshoi Opera. He remained on the roster of the Metropolitan until 1966, appearing again in 1966-1967. He also taught a master class. In 1971 he made his Broadway debut as Tevye in Fiddler on the Roof.

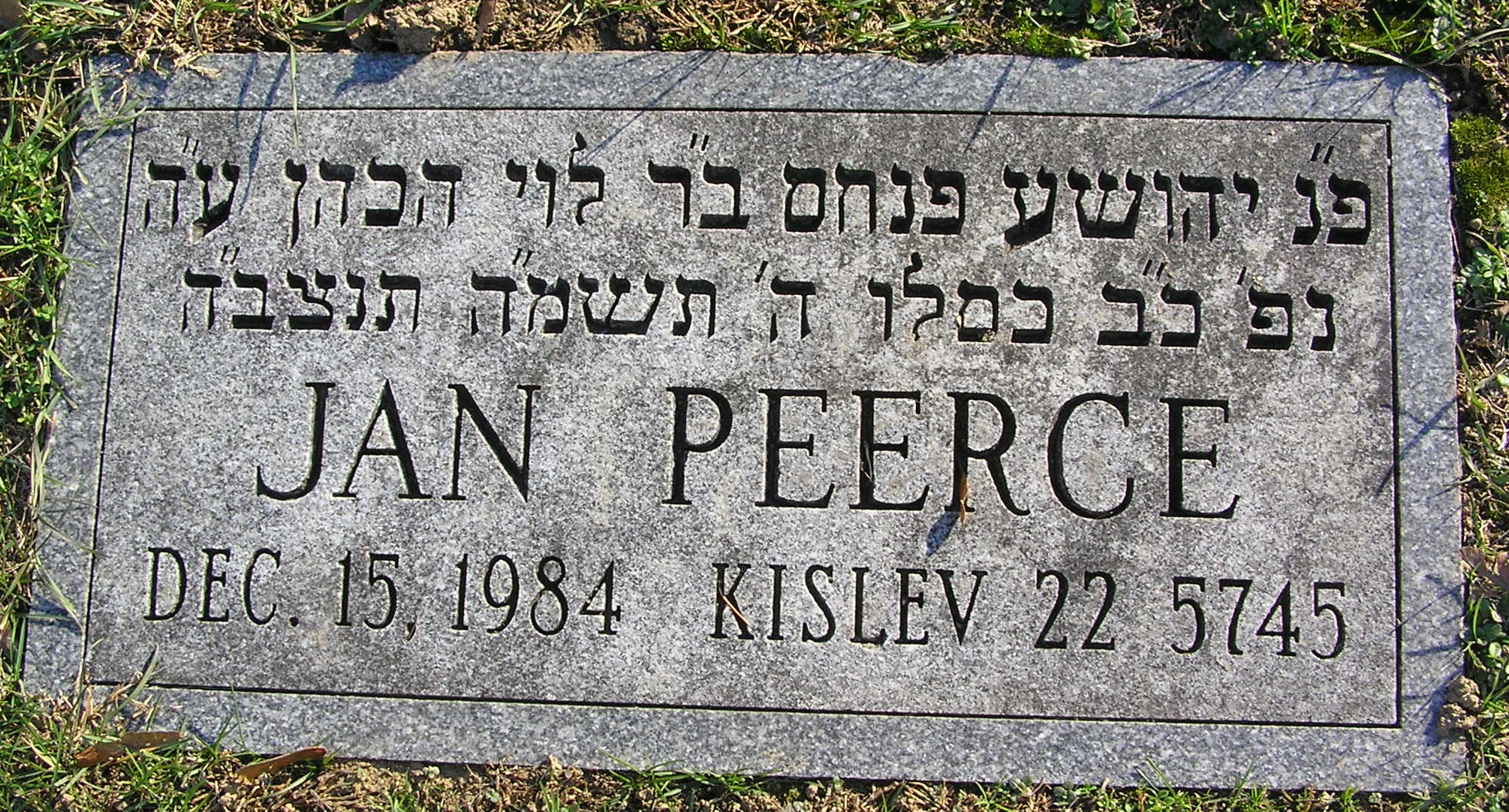
The footstone of Jan Peerce

He continued to make occasional appearances until his retirement in 1982, remaining in fine voice. His last concert was on May 2, 1982, as the guest artist with the Beth Abraham Youth Chorale in Dayton, Ohio.

== Recordings ==
Peerce's first recordings were made in 1931-1932, as a vocalist with New York area dance bands, using the names "Jack Pearl" and "Pinky Pearl." Several of these were with the Jack Berger Orchestra, with whom he was appearing at the Hotel Astor. They include popular hits of the day such as "Snuggled on Your Shoulder" and "Dancing on the Ceiling," and were issued on numerous smaller labels including Crown, Perfect, Banner and Melotone.

Peerce recorded almost exclusively for RCA Victor as a "Red Seal" artist from the late 1930s to the early 1960s. Among his first RCA Victor recordings were as a featured soloist in Nathaniel Shilkret's 1939 tribute album to Victor Herbert. Peerce had been the tenor soloist in Toscanini's 1938 broadcast concert of Beethoven's Ninth Symphony, which was rejected for commercial release by Toscanini and RCA Victor; it wasn't until 1952 that Toscanini approved a studio recording of that symphony (with Peerce as tenor soloist) for release.

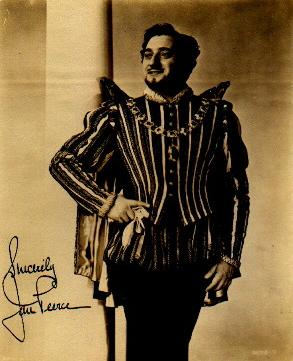
Peerce as the Duke in Rigoletto

Peerce also sang in Toscanini's 1944 performance/broadcast of Beethoven's Fidelio with Rose Bampton, followed by the complete performances of Verdi's La traviata, Puccini's La bohème (both with Licia Albanese), and Verdi's Un ballo in maschera (with Herva Nelli), all eventually released by RCA Victor on LP and CD. Peerce did not sing in Toscanini's broadcasts of Verdi's Otello, Aida, or Falstaff; he was offered the tenor parts in the latter two but declined, believing his voice was not suited for those roles. He also sang in the Madison Square Garden concert in 1944, which featured the final act of Rigoletto with Leonard Warren, Zinka Milanov, and Toscanini conducting the combined New York Philharmonic and NBC Symphony Orchestra; this performance was recorded and later released by RCA Victor on LP and CD. In 1952, he participated in Toscanini's only studio recording of the Beethoven Ninth Symphony, which the Maestro finally approved for release by RCA Victor.

Among the complete opera recordings Peerce made for RCA Victor were Verdi's Rigoletto in 1950 with Leonard Warren singing the title role, Erna Berger, and Nan Merriman, Bizet's Carmen in 1951 with Risë Stevens in the title role, Licia Albanese, and Robert Merrill, and also Donizetti's Lucia di Lammermoor in 1957 with Roberta Peters, Philip Maero, and Giorgio Tozzi and Ariadne auf Naxos, with Leonie Rysanek, Sena Jurinac, Roberta Peters, and Walter Berry, conducted also by Erich Leinsdorf. Several opera excerpt albums with Peerce were recorded by RCA Victor as well including Madama Butterfly with Licia Albanese, Samson et Dalila with Risë Stevens. Many broadcasts of live performances from the Metropolitan opera and other houses with Peerce have been released on LP and CD as well. Peerce later recorded several operas and oratorios for Vanguard Records, a good majority of them Handelian.

Peerce recorded another performance of Fidelio opposite Sena Jurinac and Beethoven's oratorio Christ on the Mount of Olives with Maria Stader, both for the Westminster label, released in 1961 and 1963, respectively; for Columbia Records he sang the title role in a 1963 recording of selections from Sigmund Romberg's The Student Prince, opposite Roberta Peters, and also featuring Giorgio Tozzi. Peerce's final religious, pop, and recital albums from the late 1960s through 1980 were released by Vanguard.

Peerce's best-selling record was his 1945 RCA Victor recording of "Bluebird of Happiness" (music by Sandor Harmati, lyrics by Edward Heyman and Harry Parr-Davies). It became his "signature tune" and he recorded it at least three times for RCA Victor. As of the late 1970s, it remained among the all-time best selling recordings by opera and concert singers. According to Peerce and his collaborator in his memoirs, Bluebird was second in sales only to Enrico Caruso's 1918 recording of George M. Cohan's "Over There". Estimated sales of the Caruso recording by discographer John R. Bolig indicate, however, that the 1918 disc was not among the top-selling operatic recordings of the Victor Talking Machine Company. Peerce titled his 1976 autobiography The Bluebird of Happiness: The Memoirs of Jan Peerce.

=== Recordings of complete operas ===
- Beethoven, Fidelio, Toscanini/Steber/Bampton/Peerce/Janssen/Belarsky, 1944, NBC Studio 8H, New York, Dec 10 and 17, RCA Victor
- Beethoven, Fidelio, Knappertsbusch/Stader/Jurinac/Peerce/Neidlinger/Ernster, 1961, Westminster
- Bizet, Carmen, Reiner/Albanese-L/Stevens/Peerce/Merrill, 1951, RCA Victor
- Donizetti, Lucia di Lammermoor, Leinsdorf/Peters-R/Peerce/Maero/Tozzi, 1957, RCA Victor
- Gounod, Faust, Monteux/los Ángeles/Miller-Mi/Peerce/Merrill/Siepi, 1955, live in New York, Melodram
- Mozart, Don Giovanni, Böhm/Steber/della Casa/Peters-R/Peerce/Corena/Siepi, 1957, live in New York, Andromeda
- Puccini, La Bohème, Toscanini/Albanese-L/McKnight/Peerce/Valentino, 1946, NBC Studio 8H, New York, Feb 3 and 10, RCA Victor
- Puccini, Madama Butterfly, Ormandy/Steber/Carré/Peerce/Bonelli, 1948, live in Los Angeles, VAI
- Romberg, The Student Prince, Allers/Peters-R/Peerce, 1963, Columbia
- Strauss, Ariadne auf Naxos, Leinsdorf/Rysanek/Peters-R/Jurinac/Peerce, 1958, Decca
- Verdi, Un ballo in maschera, Walter/Milanov/Greer/Thorborg/Peerce/Warren, 1944, live in New York, Jan 15, Myto
- Verdi, Un ballo in maschera, Toscanini/Nelli/Haskins/Turner/Peerce/Merrill, 1954, Carnegie Hall, Jan 17 and 24 and June 3, RCA Victor
- Verdi, Un ballo in maschera, Mitropoulos/Milanov/Peters-R/Anderson-M/Peerce/Merrill, 1955, live in New York, Sony
- Verdi, Rigoletto, Cellini/Berger/Peerce/Warren, 1950, RCA Victor
- Verdi, La traviata, Toscanini/Albanese-L/Peerce/Merrill, 1946, NBC Studio 8H, New York, Dec 1 and 8, RCA Victor

== Film appearances ==
Peerce was cast in a number of films including Something in the Wind, in which he played Tony the jailer. In this 1947 role, Peerce sang the Miserere from Il trovatore in a duet with his jailed charge, the film's star, Deanna Durbin. This performance is available on DVD. In 1953 he was heard (but not seen) as the voice of the tenor-character Gregory Lawrence in Tonight We Sing, a film based upon the life of Sol Hurok. In 1969, his son Larry Peerce cast his father and his uncles Max and Sender Peerce for a scene in Goodbye Columbus, which the younger Peerce directed for Paramount Pictures.
