= Radio City Music Hall of the Air =

American radio program (1932–1942)

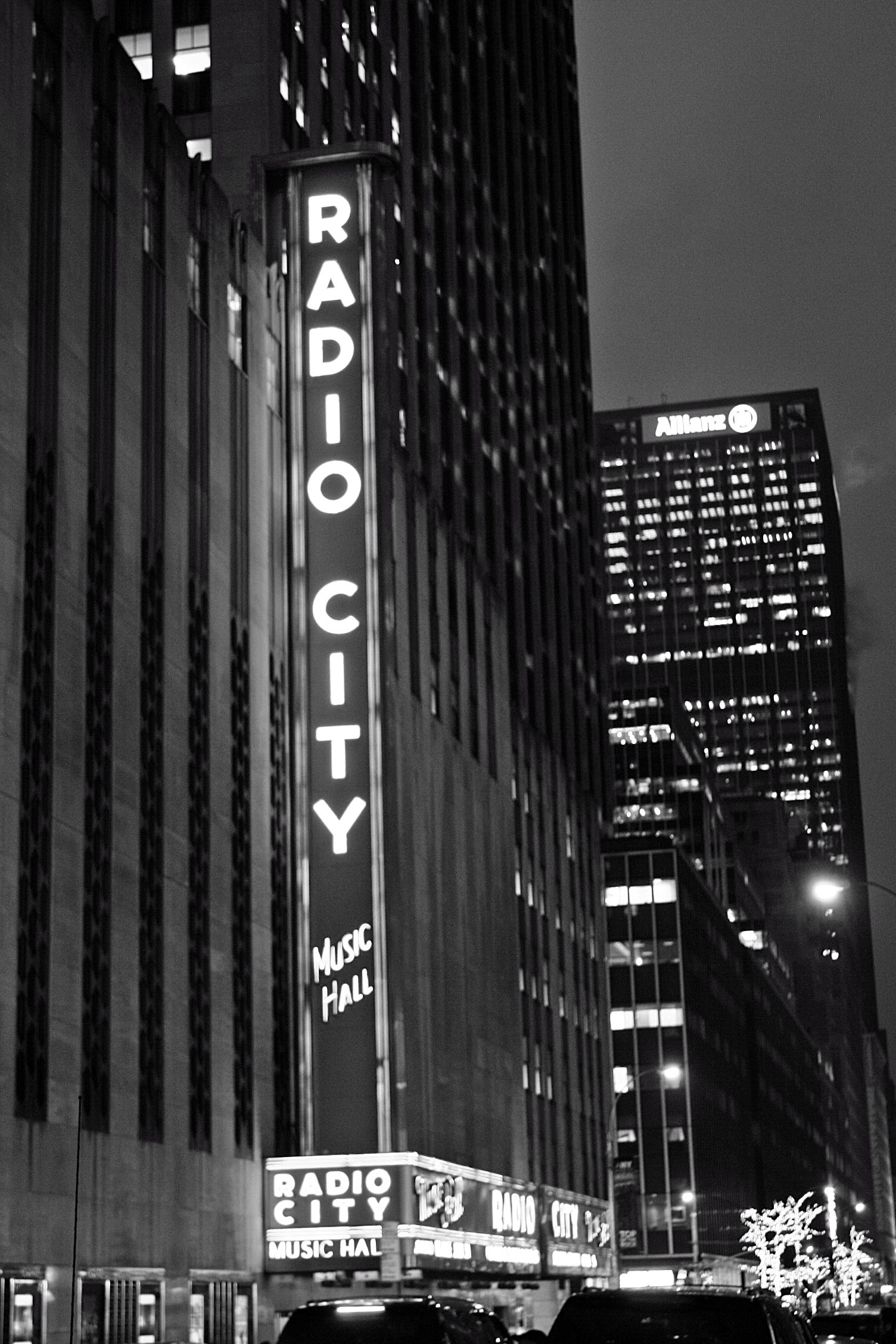
Facade of Radio City Music Hall

Radio City Music Hall of the Air was a weekly American radio program broadcast on the NBC Blue Network from 1932 through 1942 that featured a range of classical music programming extending from symphonies and other kinds of orchestral works to operas, oratorios, chamber music, choral works and other kinds of classical music literature. The program was usually broadcast live on Sunday afternoons at noon from Radio City Music Hall (RCMH) in front of a live audience in the theatre. Broadcasts featured the RCMH symphony orchestra under conductor Ernö Rapée. The program was typically an hour long, although occasionally the program's running time would be extended to a lengthier time block if they were performing a complete masterwork such as an opera.

== History ==
From 1932 through 1942 the hour-long Radio City Music Hall of the Air radio program was broadcast on the NBC Blue Network. The program was usually broadcast live on Sunday afternoons at noon from Radio City Music Hall (RCMH) in programs featuring the RCMH symphony orchestra under conductor Ernö Rapée, but with occasional time deviations to later starting time like 12:15 or 12:30 in the afternoon. Rapée was director of the program from its inception in December 1932 until the program ceased broadcasting in the autumn of 1942.

The Radio City Music Hall of the Air program was one of the more prominent "radio symphony series" programs of its era. It was dedicated to performing classical music masterworks, and featured a wide range of literature from symphonies, concerti, and other orchestral literature to operas, oratorios, chamber works, and choral music. The program was noted not only for programming music by standard European composers like Mozart, Beethoven, Brahms, Stravinsky, and Prokofiev, but also featuring American composers at a time when American-made classical music was just beginning to find its foothold in the national and international concert stage. Some American composers who were featured on the program included Aaron Copland, George Gershwin, Roy Harris, and Edgar Stillman Kelley. In 1938 the program was the recipient of a Medal of Merit award from Radio Guide magazine for excellence in radio programming.

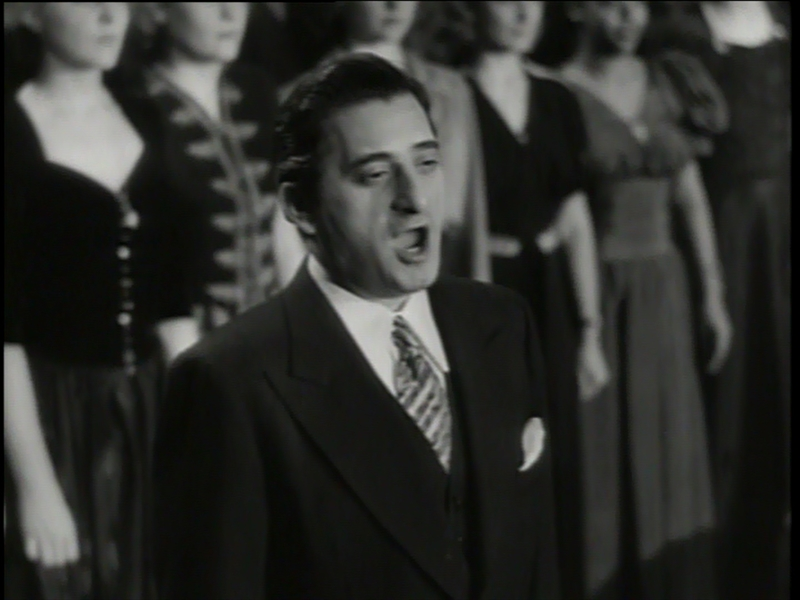
Tenor Jan Peerce whose career was launched on the Radio City Music Hall of the Air program.

In 1937 the program drew particular acclaim for its ambitious programming of the complete cycle of Jean Sibelius's seven symphonies. On October 8, 1939, the program presented the world premiere of Eugene Zador's opera Christopher Columbus; a work written by its Jewish composer while fleeing persecution from Nazi Germany by sailing across the Atlantic. On December 3, 1939, the program featured the United States premiere of Erich Zeisl's "Little Symphony"; a work whose four movements were each based on a different painting by the Austrian artist Roswitha Bitterlich.

In 1940 The New York Times described the program as the "oldest and longest sustained [program] of its kind in radio"; highlighting the fact the program had employed approximately 10,000 musicians and featured a wide range of top soloists, including sopranos Kirsten Flagstad and Viola Philo; contraltos Edwina Eustis Dick and Bruna Castagna; baritones John Charles Thomas and Robert Weede; violinists Mischa Elman, Jascha Heifetz, and Ossy Renardy; and pianists Josef Hofmann, José Iturbi and Henrietta Schumann. RCMH impresario Samuel Roxy was credited with discovering the American tenor Jan Peerce who became a regular performer on the program from its earliest broadcasts in 1932. The program also regularly featured the Stradivarius Quartet of New York; an ensemble founded by the violinist Alfred Pochon whose members also included violinist Wolfe Wolfinsohn, violist Nicolas Moldavan, and cellist Gerald Warburg. Also of note were the opportunities afforded to some African-American performers who were at that time barred from the opera stage due to racial prejudice. For example, bass-baritone Lawrence Winters performed in six broadcasts on the program during his early singing career.

In Rapée's 1945 obituary in The New York Times the paper stated that the pinnacle of his artistic success as a conductor was achieved on the occasion of the 500th broadcast of Radio City Music Hall of the Air program on April 12, 1942, with a masterful performance of Gustav Mahler's Symphony No. 8. This performance employed 400 performers; including a chorus of 300 voices.
