= Daughter of Destiny (1917 film) =

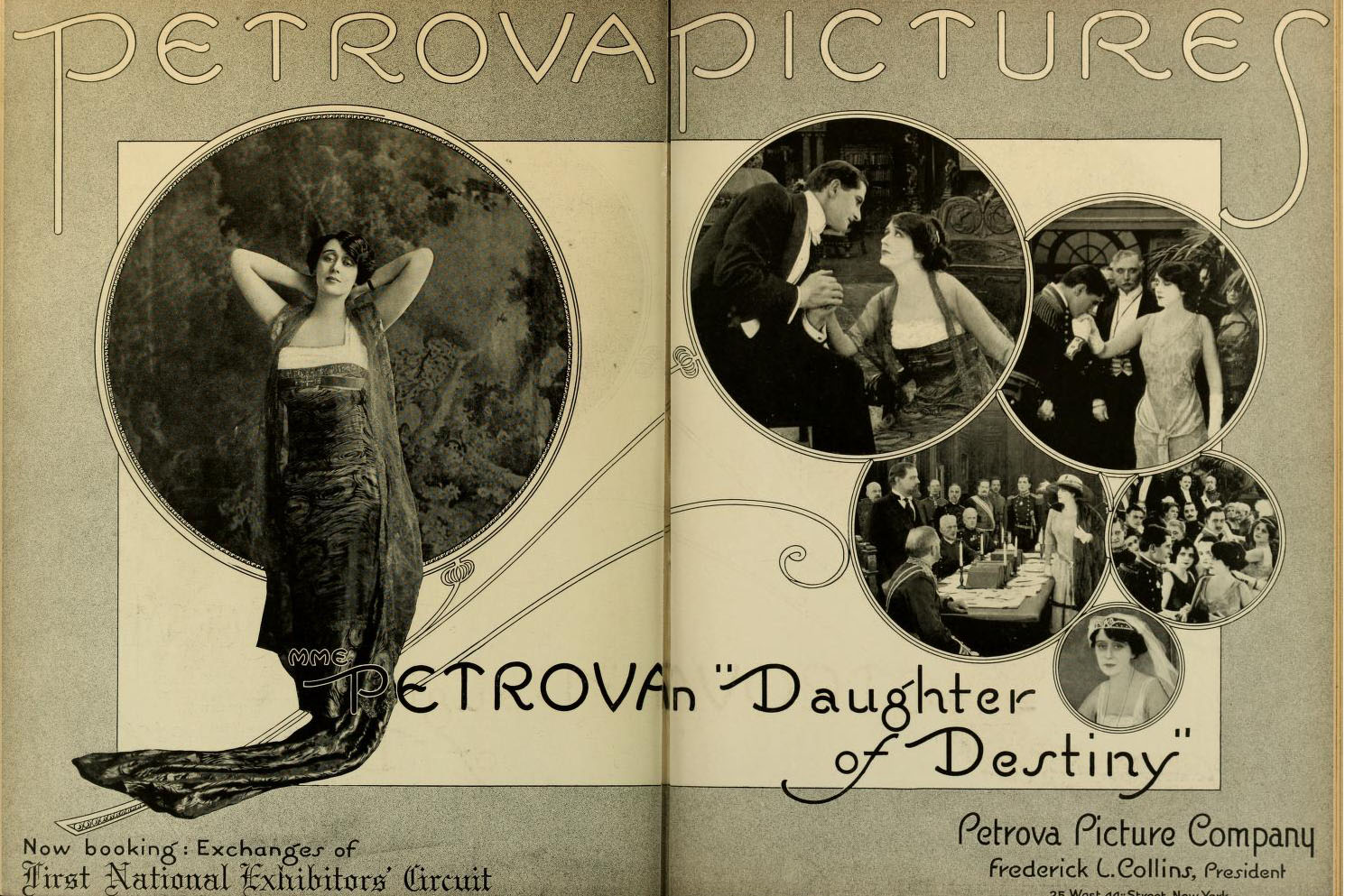
- Directed by: George Irving
- Story by: Olga Petrova
- Produced by: Olga Petrova
- Starring: Olga Petrova
- Cinematography: Harry B. Harris
- Production company: Petrova Picture Co. / First National Pictures
- Distributed by: Metro Pictures
- Release date: December 23, 1917
- Running time: 5 reels
- Country: United States
- Language: Silent (English intertitles)

Daughter of Destiny is a 1917 American silent drama film directed by George Irving, produced by and starring Olga Petrova, and distributed by Metro Pictures.

== Plot ==
As described in a film magazine, Marion Ashley (Petrova), daughter of the newly appointed American ambassador to Belmark, is married to Franz Jorn (Randolf), a French artist who also is a spy in the employ of the imperial government. Jorn is anxious to learn certain American war secrets through Marion, but is unsuccessful. Returning to his studio he finds a detective, and in a fight the detective is killed. Jorn places his ring on the dead man's finger and sets fire to the studio. The burned body is mistaken for Jorn. Marion goes to Belmark with her father Ambassador Ashley (Broderick). There she falls in love with Leopold (Harding), the Crown Prince, who asks her to marry him. Marion learns that, if Leopold marries her, war will be declared on Belmark and the country will be devastated, so she gives Leopold up. Jorn appears and tells Marion that Belmark is connected to a worldwide war for greed. The people are demanding peace and Marion goes to tell them that the American government will help them. Jorn places a bomb at the feet of Leopold and Marion, seeing it, throws herself at his feet. The bomb explodes and Marion is severely injured while Jorn is killed.

== Cast ==
- Olga Petrova as Marion Ashley
- Thomas Holding as Leopold, The Crown Prince
- Anders Randolf as Franz Jorn
- Robert Broderick as Ambassador Ashley
- Henry Leone as Police Agent Morhange (credited as Henri Leone)
- Richard Garrick as Graham West
- Carl Dietz as Secret Service Man
- Nita Allen as The Maid (credited as Anita Allen)
- Beatrix Sherman as Art Student

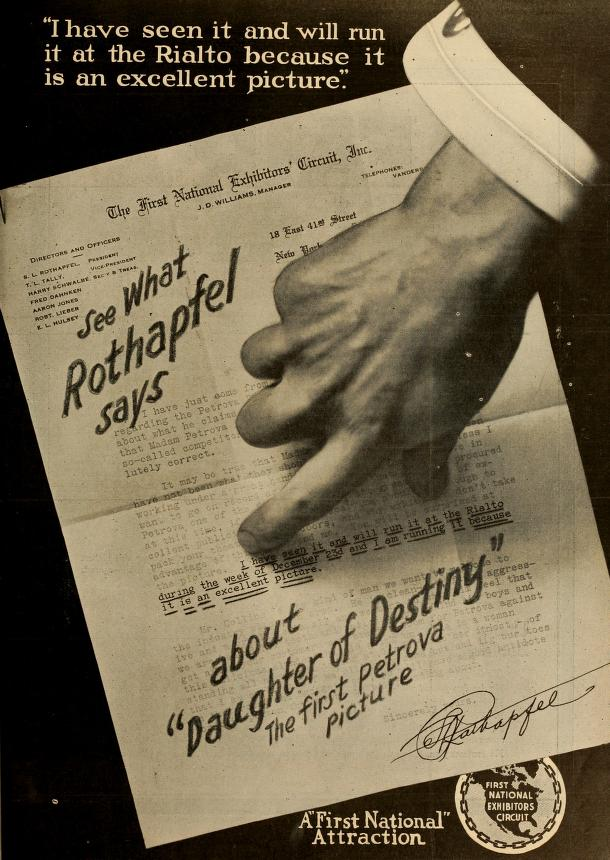
Advertisement for Daughter of Destiny featuring S. L. Rothafel endorsement

== Reception ==
Like many American films of the time, Daughter of Destiny was subject to cuts by city and state film censorship boards. The Chicago Board of Censors required a cut of the cafe scene with a husband embracing a young woman sitting on his lap, setting a dead body on fire, and lighting and throwing an explosive to the balcony.

== Preservation status ==
The last known print was destroyed in the 1965 MGM vault fire. Daughter of Destiny is now considered to be a lost film.
