= Christopher Columbus (Zador) =

Opera by Eugene Zador

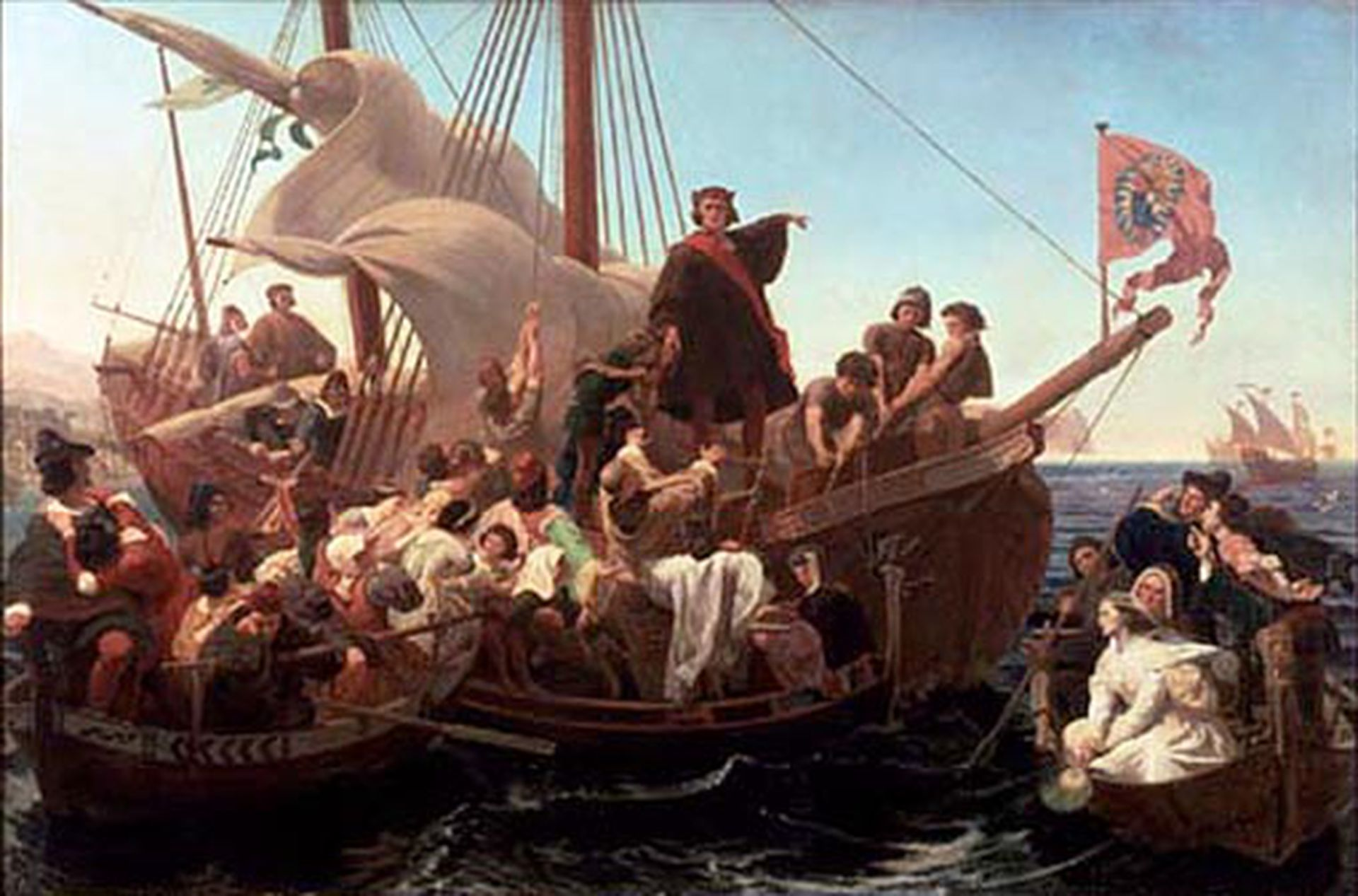
Christopher Columbus on the Santa María as depicted in Emanuel Leutze's 1855 painting.

Christopher Columbus is an opera in one act by composer Eugene Zador with a German-language libretto by Archduke Joseph Francis of Austria. Zador, a Hungarian Jew, wrote the opera while voyaging across the Atlantic Ocean in 1939 to flee persecution from Nazi Germany. The work depicts the first voyage of Christopher Columbus to America in 1492. Soprano Josepha Chekova wrote an English-language translation to the work for its world premiere on October 8, 1939. Her translation has been used several times for performances of the work in the United States, including on a recording made by the American Symphony Orchestra in 1975. The opera is approximately one hour in length.

== Plot ==
The opera occurs in a single act which is divided into five scenes. The first scene occurs in the Spanish court of Ferdinand and Isabella and dramatizes Columbus's successful funding campaign before the Spanish monarchs. The remaining four scenes all occur on board the Santa María with the final scene depicting Columbus's landing at San Salvador on 12 October 1492.

== History ==
Eugene Zador was a Hungarian Jew who fled Austria on the day of the Anschluss to return to his native country. Recognizing that his safety in Europe was likely only temporary due to the rise of Nazi Germany, he sought employment in the United States and was able to secure a position on the faculty of the New York College of Music. The school obtained an American visa for Zador, and he sailed to the United States in 1939. While traveling across the Atlantic Ocean he wrote the music to his opera Christopher Columbus, making the score both a reflection of Columbus's journey to the New World but also a personal reflection of Zador's own journey to America at the time of the Holocaust.

Christopher Columbus had its world premiere on October 8, 1939. It was presented in a concert version at the Center Theatre in New York City with conductor Ernö Rapée leading the symphony orchestra of Radio City Music Hall (RCMH). Originally the opera was scheduled for performance at the RCMH, but ticket demand was high enough that the performance was moved to the larger Center Theatre which sold out. The premiere used an English-language translation of Archduke Joseph Francis of Austria's original German-language libretto by soprano Josepha Chekova.

The original cast included Robert Weede as Christopher Columbus, Jan Peerce as Diego Columbus, Martha Lipton as Queen Isabella, Lorenzo Alvary as King Ferdinand II, and Louis Purdey as a Saracen. In addition to being heard by the audience in the theatre, the performance was broadcast live nationally on the NBC Blue Network and on WJZ in New York City on the radio program Radio City Music Hall of the Air.

In 1956 the Tucson Symphony Orchestra performed the opera using Chekova's English-language translation. Her translation was also used on the American Symphony Orchestra's 1975 recording of the opera made under the direction of Laszlo Halasz.

== Critical reception ==
The Musical Courier critic wrote that Zador's score "showed manifest modernistic tendencies as well as several derivative ideas". The New York Times was critical of the libretto and stated that the story had been shortened to the point that it prevented "dramatic action", and that its episodic construction made the work more akin to a cantata rather than opera. That reviewer also felt the vocal writing lacked a sense of appealing melody, and felt the music overall was derivative of Ildebrando Pizzetti while simultaneously praising the orchestral score as "colorful" and "richly-textured" and providing the "most interest" to the work.
