= Steel Pier Theatre =

Theater in Atlantic City, New Jersey

Coordinates: 39.3577°N 74.4191°W

The Steel Pier Theatre (SPT) was a theatre in Atlantic City, New Jersey located at the Steel Pier. It opened in 1898 and operated as a theatre venue into the 1970s. It was converted into a venue for boxing known as the Steel Pier Arena which presented a summer season of "all-star boxing" matches in the summer of 1979 before closing permanently later that year. It was destroyed by fire in December 1982.

== History ==
The Steel Pier Theatre opened in 1898. At some point during the theatre's history architect William Harold Lee was responsible for designing renovations and alterations to the theatre. In its early years Eddie Cassady headlined a minstrel show, Steel Pier Minstrels (SPM), in the summer months at the theatre. The SPM was also known as Frank Elliott’s Minstrels and continued to play at the theatre into the 1930s. The theatre was also periodically used as a venue for Yiddish theatre during the 1920s with actors like Celia Adler and Samuel Goldenberg.

By 1927, films were being screened at the SPT. Variety theatre and vaudeville was also featured at the theatre. Some of the variety performers who worked at the SPT included The Royal Lilliputians (1928), Eddie Cantor (1930), and Arren and Broderick (1933). In 1929 soprano Hope Hampton was the prima donna in production of Puccini's La bohème and Massenet's Manon given at the SPT by the French-Italian Opera Company. Josepha Chekova starred as Leonora in Giuseppe Verdi's Il trovatore at the SPT in 1935. The Atlantic City Opera Company also used the theatre in the 1930s. Both Abbott and Costello and Glenn Miller and His Orchestra played at the theatre in 1942.

In the early 1960s it was being used as nightclub with comics like Joe E. Ross performing there. In the late 1960s the theatre was home to the Tony Grant Children's Theatre. The theatre was converted into a space to hold boxing matches and was rechristened the Steel Pier Arena with a seating capacity of 1,850 people. The first event of this kind was a boxing match between George Chaplin and Duane Bobick on July 3, 1979. Further boxing matches were held into August 1979, and the summer "all-star" fight series was filmed for broadcast on UA-Columbia Cablevision. The venue closed permanently later that year.

The SPT was destroyed by a fire set by an arsonist on December 10, 1982.
