= Freddie Trenkler =

Freddie Trenkler (January 9, 1913 - May 21, 2001) was a comic ice skater.

He was born in Austria. He dressed in rags and was known for his hilarious stumbles and falls on Broadway, television and film.

Combining amazing skill with amusing slapstick, Trenkler dashes madly round the ice, tears toward the audience, stops dead on his heels a half-inch south of the pit. Amid much that is pleasant, Icetime suffers from too little display of skill and too much display of scenery.

— Time, July 3, 1944

Trenkler died at age 88 in California.

== Television ==
- The Ed Sullivan Show (1957)

== Films ==
- The Countess of Monte Cristo (1948)

== Broadway ==
- Howdy Mr. Ice (1949)
- Icetime (1946–1947)
- It Happens on Ice (1941–1942)
