= Roswitha Bitterlich =

Austrian painter, artist and sculptor (1920 - 2015)

Roswitha Bitterlich, also known by her married names Roswitha Bitterlich-Brink and Roswitha Wingen-Bitterlich, (24 April 1920 – 10 December 2015, Porto Alegre) was an Austrian painter, graphic artist, sculptor, and writer.

== Life and career ==
Roswitha Bitterlich was born in Bregenz, Austria on 4 April 1920. Her mother was the Austrian Catholic mystic Gabriele Bitterlich who founded the Opus Sanctorum Angelorum, a movement of the Catholic Church that promotes devotion to angels, especially guardian angels. Her father was the Austrian lawyer and state government secretary Hans Bitterlich, and her brother was the Austrian priest and writer Hansjörg Bitterlich. In 1921 she moved with her family to Šluknov, and after seven years there to Innsbruck in 1928. She was educated at schools in that city, and began her career as an artist while a child in Innsbruck.

A prodigy, Bitterlich had her first professional exhibition in 1932 and in 1933 a book of reproductions of her work was published in Berlin. She had a series of highly acclaimed exhibitions in cities in Austria, Germany, the Netherlands, Czechoslovakia, and Denmark in the 1930s, including an acclaimed May 1937 exhibition at the Kunsthal Charlottenborg of the Royal Danish Academy of Art in Copenhagen. Composer Erich Ziesel's Little Symphony based each of its four movements off of a different painting by Bitterlich. After its Austrian premiere, it was given its United States debut at Radio City Music Hall in New York in 1939 and was heard on the radio program Radio City Music Hall of the Air on December 3, 1939. In 1941 her graphic art cycle Till Eulenspiegel created to words by Hans Leip was published in Berlin.

In 1945 Bitterlich married the Catholic publicist and anti-Nazi resistance-movement fighter Michael Brink. Her husband was imprisoned by the Nazi in a concentration camp, and died in 1947 as a result of health problems incurred from his stay there. Roswitha gave birth to their daughter, Mechthild Maria, in 1946. In 1951 she had a successful exhibition at the Galerie St. Etienne in New York City which displayed oil paintings, watercolors and graphic works created by Bitterlich in the years 1945 through 1950. After marrying her second husband, Hubert Wingen, she immigrated with her husband and daughter to Brazil.

She died on 10 December 2015 in Porto Alegre, Brazil.
