= Hats Off to Ice =

Hats Off to Ice was an ice show originally conceived by figure skating champion Sonja Henie, G.S. Eyssell, and Arthur Wirtz. The show was presented at the Center Theatre in New York City and ran from 1944 to 1946 for a total of 889 performances. It became Henie's most popular show.

== Musical ice shows ==
As an ice theater, the Center Theatre's initial presentation was of Henie's production It Happens on Ice, the first of the musical ice spectacles by Henie. More ice spectacles produced by Henie and Wirtz soon followed, including: Stars on Ice, Hats Off to Ice, Icetime, and Howdy Mr. Ice.

By the end of the 1940s, the novelty of ice shows had waned, and the sensation had all but ended.
