= Charlotte Arren =

American comedienne, actress, dancer, and singer

Charlotte Arren (left) performing with her brother Charles.

Charlotte Arren (born Charlotte L. Ehrenberg, July 9, 1911 – September 30, 1986), also known by her married name Charlotte M. Broderick, was an American comedienne, actress, singer, and dancer. A native of Chicago, she grew up touring as a child entertainer in her family's vaudeville act, the Four Arrens, performing alongside her parents and brother Charles from 1917 to 1922. After this she formed an act with her brother, the Arren Kids, which was active from 1922 to 1930. She concurrently began performing in stage musicals in American regional theatre during the late 1920s.

As an adult performer, Arren was one half of the comedy, dancing, and musical duo Arren and Broderick which also featured her husband, the pianist and composer Johnny Broderick. This act premiered in Chicago in 1931 and was active until as late as 1970 in performances in musicals, nightclubs, variety theatre, and film. The duo was particularly known for their sketch "Opera in the Rough" in which Arren parodied operatic divas with Broderick as her accompanist.

== Early life and child performer ==
The daughter of Frank L. Ehrenberg and his wife Charlotte Ehrenberg, Charlotte L. Ehrenberg was born in Chicago on July 9, 1911. Charlotte's parents were singers and comedians who used the surname Arren on the stage. They passed down their craft to their children. The Ehrenberg family worked together in a variety entertainment act known as the Four Arrens.

Charlotte sang duets with her older brother Charles in the family act. The Four Arrens were performing as early as September 1917, and as late as July 1922. The popularity of Charlotte and her brother led their parents to rework the act into featuring just the children in a singing and dancing duo. They began appearing as the Arren Kids with the billing "The Baby Grands of Variety" as early as November 1922.

In 1923 the Arren Kids act was booked in the Orpheum Circuit. They also worked under the billing of Charles & Charlotte Arren, including in a return to the Orpheum Circuit in 1925. The duo worked primarily out of Chicago and the surrounding region until relocating to New York in the summer of 1927. They were billed as the Arren Kids in American and Canadian radio broadcasts in 1929.

Arren ventured out on her own when she landed a featured part in the musical comedy Swim Girl, Swim which opened at the Metropolitan Theatre in Boston in September 1927 with a cast led by Bebe Daniels. In this show she sang and danced in the musical number "Asleep in the Deep". Soon after she was cast in a show called Joy Bells at Shea's Buffalo in which she sang the song "Call for Mr. Brown". It was produced by John Murray Anderson. She subsequently toured nationally in this show in 1927–1928, but by the end of March 1928 had left this production to reteam with her brother in vaudeville.

== Arren and Broderick ==
In the winter of 1931 Arren formed a partnership with the pianist and composer Johnny Broderick. She had met the musician though her talent agent who had introduced them to each other with the idea of forming a creative team. The act they crafted together involved Arren doing a parody of a coloratura soprano with Broderick as her assisting accompanist. The original act featured Arren performing the song "Kiss Me Again" from the operetta Mlle. Modiste with buffoonish stage antics while Broderick serves as her warm-hearted but long suffering pianist. At one point Arren lifts up her gown to reveal roller skates which she then uses to skate off the stage.

Arren and Brodderick debuted their act in Chicago in late 1931, and by October 1932 they were touring the sketch "Opera in the Rough" at the Lyric Theatre in Indianapolis, Indiana. The duo also did another set where they performed comedic versions of popular songs. This act played the Orpheum Circuit in 1932 for performances at the Orpheum Theater in Davenport, Iowa, Orpheum Theatre in Green Bay, Wisconsin, and the Orpheum Theatre in Sioux City, Iowa.

Arren and Broderick continued to tour for performances around the country, sometimes performing live in conjunction with screening of movies and other times appearing in variety theatre. Theaters they performed at in 1933 included the RKO Capitol Theatre in New Jersey, both the Fox Theatre and the RKO Bushwick Theatre in Brooklyn, the Hippodrome Theatre in Baltimore, both the Carman Theatre and Fay's Theatre in Philadelphia, the Fox Theatre in Detroit, both the Capitol Theatre and the Steel Pier Theatre in Atlantic City, the Penn Theatre in Wilkes-Barre, Pennsylvania, Shea's Buffalo Theatre, the Fox Theatre in St. Louis, the Palace Theatre in Chicago, the Metropolitan Theatre in Boston, and the Roxy Theatre in New York City among other venues.

At some point prior to October 1935 Arren and Broderick married. They continued to work professionally as a stage duo until as late as 1970. In 1935 the husband and wife team were cast members in the Broadway musical revue, Earl Carroll's Sketch Book, which played at first the Winter Garden Theatre and then the Majestic Theatre. In this show Arren did a comic impersonation of operatic soprano Jenny Lind. That same year Arren and Broderick starred in the short musical film The Doorman's Opera from the Broadway Brevities series. They were also featured in the British musical film Calling All Stars (1937). Her spoof of an operatic soprano was featured in Broadway Melody of 1940 – a musical film produced by Metro-Goldwyn-Mayer – in which she performed a humorous rendition of the famous vocal waltz "Il bacio".

Arren's performances with Broderick were celebrated during the 1930s and 1940s, making her one the era's successful female comediennes. The opera comedy sketch became a template for Arren and Broderick which they used for decades, including on tours to London and Paris. Arren's parodies of opera prima donnas involved humorous facial contortions that invoked a "grotesque effect", high-pitched screams, cross-eyed looks, and comic gesticulations. While her work engaged with physical comedy and parody it also would switch into serious moments that would show off Arren's genuine vocal gifts, including singing up to an F above high C.

With the end of vaudeville, Arren and Broderick moved into working as nightclub entertainers from the 1940s to the 1960s. In 1957 they returned to Broadway as Jerry Lewis's co-stars at the Palace Theatre in the variety show Jerry Lewis at the Palace. As late as 1966 they were booked as entertainers at the Nevada Lodge in Lake Tahoe for 15 weeks of performances. In 1970 they were booked as musicians at the Ponce de Leon Festival in Port Charlotte, Florida.

== Personal life and death ==
In 1965 Charlotte and John Broderick's eldest son, John E. Broderick, Jr., died from injuries sustained in a motor vehicle accident at the age of 22. They were the parents of three other children: a son, Arren Michael, and daughters, Barbara and Patricia. In 1963 the couple moved to Port Charlotte, Florida, with their three youngest children.

In addition to performing with his wife, John E. Broderick, Sr. was a composer and a native of Sharon, Pennsylvania. He was known for writing the music to the songs "Hail to the Legionnaires" and "A Star Stood Still". The latter song was recorded by Mahalia Jackson. He also created songs with the lyricist Arthur Longbrake, and occasionally wrote both words and music for songs like "Little Darling of Mine" and "Do You Mind If I Dream About You". John died in Port Charlotte on April 14, 1977.

Charlotte M. Broderick died in Orlando, Florida, on September 30, 1986.
