= Eileen Seigh =

American figure skater

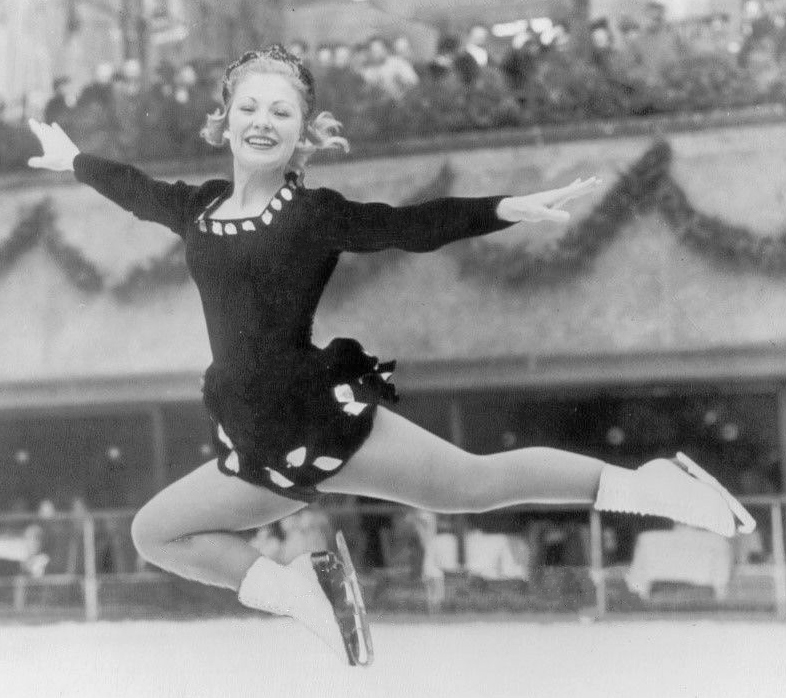
- Seigh in 1949

Personal information
- Full name: Eileen Seigh
- Born: December 27, 1928 (age 97) New York City, U.S.

Figure skating career
- Country: United States

Eileen Seigh (born December 27, 1928) is a retired American figure skater. She represented the United States at the 1948 Winter Olympics, where she placed 11th. Following her retirement from competitive skating, she skated professionally on Broadway in the Howdy, Mr. Ice ice show. She later worked as a skating coach at the Broadmoor Hotel in Colorado Springs, Colorado. In December 1952 she married one of her pupils, Pete Honnen, the founder of the heavy equipment company Honnen Equipment.

== Competitive highlights ==
| Event | 1945 | 1946 | 1947 | 1948 |
|---|---|---|---|---|
| Winter Olympic Games | | | | 11th |
| World Championships | | | 4th | |
| U.S. Championships | 1st J | 4th | 3rd | |
