= Howdy Mr. Ice =

1940s New York ice show

Howdy Mr. Ice was one of a series of ice shows at the Center Theatre in Rockefeller Center, New York City, that was produced by Sonja Henie and Arthur M. Wirtz in the 1940s.

Other shows in the series include, It Happens on Ice, Stars on Ice, Hats Off to Ice, Icetime and Icetime of 1948. Howdy Mr. Ice boasted "the greatest collection of comedians and skaters" featuring the famed, "icettes".

== Cast and crew ==
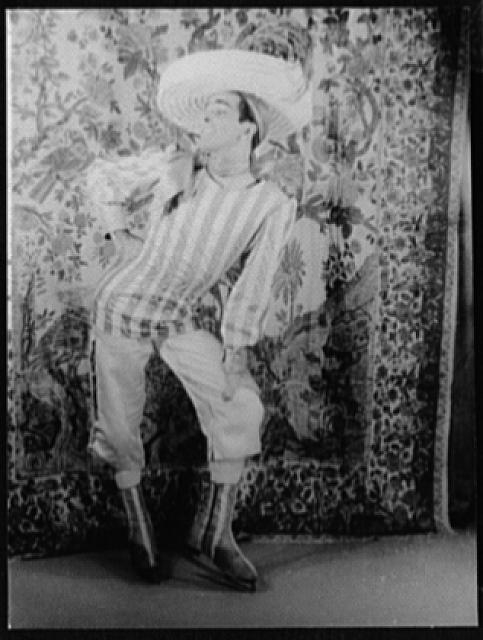
Rudy Richards in Howdy Mr. Ice (1948)

Executive director: Arthur M. Wirtz, production director: William H. Burke, musical director: David Mendoza, staged by: Catherine Littlefield.

Skaters

- Skippy Baxter, hailed as the world's greatest male skater, is the only known blade star to execute a triple turn in the air.
- Eileen Seigh, U.S. Olympic skating star.
- Freddie Trenkler, the "Bouncing Ball of the Ice", and acclaimed as the world's foremost ice comedian.
- Trixie, internationally famous juggler.
- Rudy Richards, Cissy Trenholm, Jinx Clark, Harrison Thomson, The Prestons, Paul Castle, James Sisk, Kay Corcoran, Buster Grace, Buck Pennington, John Walsh, Mary Jane Yeo, Raymond Henry Berg, and John Kasper.

Vocals

- Nola Fairbanks, Dick Craig, Fred Martell, William Douglas.
