= Robert Weede =

American baritone (1903–1972)

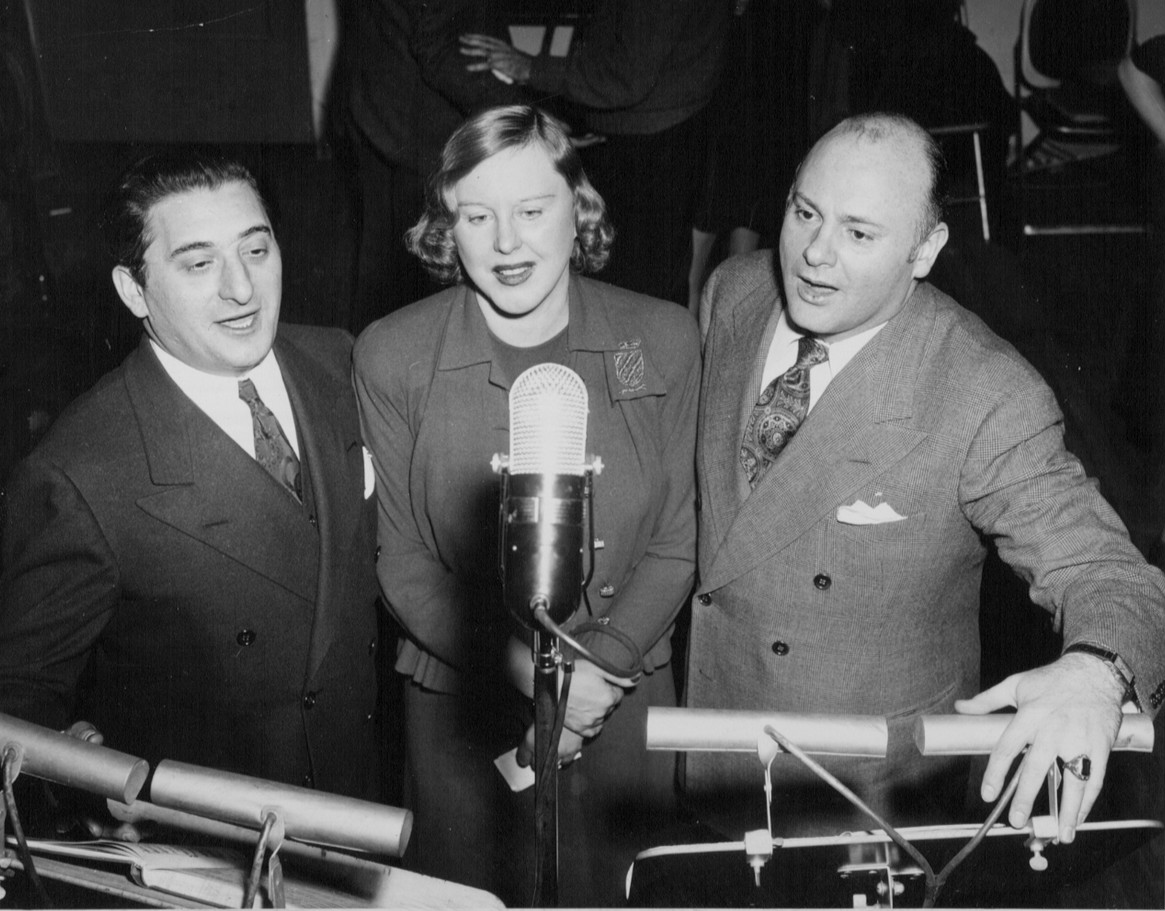
- Weede at right with Jan Peerce and Jean Tennyson on the radio program "Great Moments in Music", 1942
- Born: February 22, 1903; Baltimore, Maryland, U.S.
- Died: July 9, 1972 (aged 69); Walnut Creek, California, U.S.
- Occupation: Singer

Robert Weede /ˈwiːdi/ (February 22, 1903 – July 9, 1972) was an American operatic baritone.

== Life and career ==
Lebendige Vergangenheit

Robert Wiedefeld was born in Baltimore, Maryland, and had two sisters, Elizabeth and Mary Wiedefeld. Weede studied voice at the Eastman School of Music and in Milan. He made his Metropolitan Opera debut in 1937, as Tonio in Pagliacci. His other roles at the Metropolitan included the name part in Rigoletto (opposite Jussi Björling), Amonasro (Aïda), Manfredo (L'amore dei tre re), Shaklovity (Khovanshchina) and Baron Scarpia (Tosca). It was with Rigoletto that he made his debuts in Chicago (1939), San Francisco (1940), and at the New York City Opera (1948). In 1939 he portrayed the title role in the world premiere of Eugene Zador's Christopher Columbus at the Center Theatre.

At the New York City Opera, Weede also sang in Pagliacci and in the world premiere of William Grant Still's Troubled Island, opposite Marie Powers, Marguerite Piazza and Robert McFerrin. In Mexico City, the baritone appeared with Maria Callas in 1950, in Aïda and Tosca. Later, he sang again with Callas in Chicago, in Il trovatore and Madama Butterfly.

In 1956, he scored a great success on Broadway as Tony Esposito in the original production of Frank Loesser's The Most Happy Fella, which was recorded by Columbia Records; and as Jacob Marley in The Stingiest Man in Town, a musical adaptation of Dickens' A Christmas Carol. He was also seen on Broadway in Milk and Honey (1961–63, also recorded) and Cry for Us All (1970).

Weede's operatic recordings include excerpts from Bizet's Carmen, for Columbia in 1946, with Risë Stevens conducted by Georges Sébastian; and an album of arias by Verdi for Capitol Records in 1953, conducted by Nicola Rescigno. In 2006, Lebendige Vergangenheit published a compact disc of excerpts from his Bizet and Verdi recordings, as well as various live performances from 1948 through 1954.

Weede often gave assistance to younger singers, especially John Alexander, Dominic Cossa, Mario Lanza, Jan Peerce, Seymour Schwartzman and Norman Treigle. He died in Walnut Creek, California, in 1972.

== Videography ==
- Spielman: The Stingiest Man In Town (Munsel, Rathbone; Camarata, Petrie, 1956) [live] VAI
