= Beatrix Sherman =

American artist

- Sherman c. 1916 in Cartoons Magazine
- Born: January 10, 1894; Scranton, Pennsylvania
- Died: January 1, 1975 (aged 80); West Palm Beach, Florida
- Occupation: Silhouette artist

Beatrix (Beatrice) Sherman (10 January 1894 – 1 January 1975) was an American 20th-century silhouette artist.

== Early life ==
Beatrice Sherman, later known as Beatrix, was born in Scranton, Pennsylvania, United States on January 10, 1894. She studied art from an early age, attending Saturday classes at the Art Institute of Chicago from October 1905 until January 1906. She later went on to attend the Institute's Juvenile School in the fall of 1909.

At the age of 17, Sherman enrolled at Henderson College, in Arkadelphia, Arkansas. The Star, a periodical published by Henderson's Literary Societies, lists Beatrice Sherman as arriving at Henderson as an 'Irregular' student in the Spring semester of 1911. She was an active participant in a number of extracurricular activities, including art class, tennis club and the women's basketball team.

She returned to the Art Institute of Chicago in February 1912, attending classes through March 1914. It was at this time that Beatrice changed her given name to Beatrix.

== Traveling silhouettist ==
A.P. Shield, 31 August 1926 (Private Collection)

Beatrix Sherman's first documented silhouettes were shown at the Twenty-Sixth Annual Exhibition of Water Colors, and Pastels and Miniatures by American Artists held by the Art Institute of Chicago from May 7 to June 7, 1914. At the exhibition, Sherman displayed six pieces, five of which were silhouettes.

Sherman attended her first major exhibition at the Panama Pacific International Exposition (PPIE) held in San Francisco in 1915. It was around this time that she greatly increased the amount of work she produced, cutting as many silhouettes as she possibly could. She also began keeping guest books to document the signatures of the subjects she cut. There are six known surviving guest books, all in private collections. The one used at the PPIE was sold at auction in May 2006.

T. Roosevelt, 1918 (Private Collection)

Lafayette, 1928 (Private Collection)

Sherman often compared herself to August Edouart, a well-known 19th century French silhouette artist who kept books with an extra copy of each sitter's silhouette. This not only allowed Edouart to keep a visual record of his work, but also allowed him to cut copies of silhouettes for sale at a later date. Beatrix Sherman emulated August Edouart by numbering or making a notation on the back of each of her silhouettes, enabling her to create an extensive personal archive that included both silhouettes and her sitter's autographs. Often she would write comments on the verso of the silhouette noting both the location and anything else of interest about the sitter or the process of cutting the silhouette. Sherman's use of scissors in lieu of a camera created a collection that documented society in both an old fashioned and personal way. She even began to experiment with larger silhouettes, and in Fall of 1925, Beatrix Sherman advertised in The New Yorker, offering to cut not only single but also family silhouettes to be made into Christmas cards.

Keeping a permanent studio in New York City through the 1950s, Sherman traveled extensively cutting silhouettes. Attending six World Fairs, in 25 years, she attempted to expand the traditional boundaries of the silhouette artist, doing more than simply cutting a quick and inexpensive portrait of the sitter. Her efforts to adapt her profession to changing times allowed her both greater economic and artistic freedom. Even from an early age, she had begun copyrighting silhouettes of a number of the famous people she cut. Reproductions of presidents Theodore Roosevelt, Woodrow Wilson, and Herbert Hoover were copyrighted in 1918.

Beatrix Sherman attended art classes at The Arts Students League, eventually becoming a lifetime member. It was possibly around this time that she first created Silhouette Stick-on-Figures, packages of small themed miniature silhouette figures with various decorative uses. She not only printed silhouettes of famous historical people, including Napoleon, Dickens, Lafayette and Washington, but designed mats and frames for her silhouettes. Sherman also printed a series of nursery rhymes in three colors, complete with accompanying silhouette illustrations.

Silhouette Stick-on Figures, c. 1921 (Private Collection)

== Later years ==
Sherman continued to cut both single and larger family silhouettes into her later career. After relocating to West Palm Beach in 1957, she continued to attend social and charitable events with the goal of cutting silhouettes. Previous exhibitions and international fairs displaying her signed silhouettes of the famous allowed her access to a number of different social circles, helping her to continue pursuing her art creating collections of signed portraits. In 1961, Sherman cut the silhouette of President John F. Kennedy. The January 1, 1961 Palm Beach-Post Times article wrote 'She was admitted to his press conference Saturday morning to try her art from the sidelines while Kennedy spoke.'

Kennedy was her 10th presidential silhouette. It is of interest that in the same article Sherman discusses her plans to publish a book to be titled Shadows of the Great featuring silhouettes from her collection of portraits of over 10,000 people. One of her last exhibits, at the sixth anniversary of the Henry Morrison Flagler Museum, displayed a number of her silhouettes, including President Kennedy's and nine other presidential portraits Sherman had cut, beginning with Theodore Roosevelt, at the Hero Land Bazaar, held in New York City in 1917.

Beatrix Sherman lived to be 80 years old. She died on January 1, 1975, in West Palm Beach, Florida.
