= Ernö Rapée =

American conductor and composer (1891–1945)

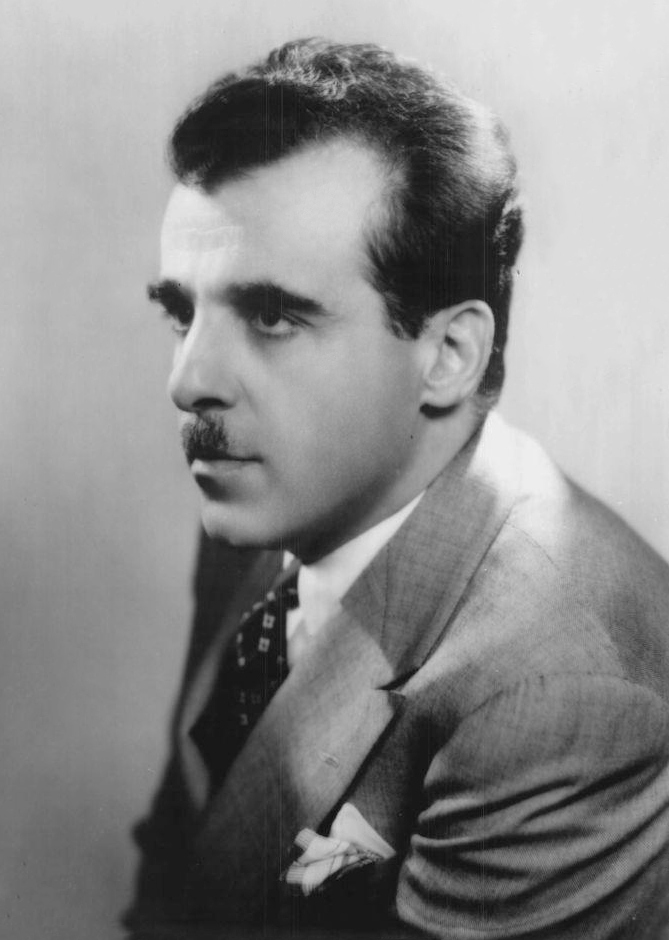
Rapée in 1937.

Ernő Rapée (or Erno Rapee) (4 June 1891 – 26 June 1945) was a Hungarian-born American symphonic conductor in the first half of the 20th century whose prolific career spanned both classical and popular music. His most famous tenure was as the head conductor of the Radio City Symphony Orchestra, the resident orchestra of the Radio City Music Hall, whose music was also heard by millions over the air on the radio program Radio City Music Hall of the Air.

A virtuoso pianist, Rapée is also remembered for popular songs that he wrote in the late 1920s as photoplay music for silent films. When not conducting live orchestras, he supervised film scores for sound pictures, compiling a substantial list of films on which he worked as composer, arranger or musical director.

== Biography ==
Rapée was born in Budapest, Hungary where he studied as a pianist and later conductor at the Royal National Hungarian Academy of Music. Later, he was assistant conductor to Ernst von Schuch in Dresden. As a composer, his first piano concerto was played by the Philharmonic Orchestra of Vienna, and after a tour of America as a guest conductor, began performing at the Rialto Theater in New York as assistant to Hugo Riesenfeld, where he began composing and conducting for silent films.

Following positions at the Rialto and Rivoli theaters, he was hired by Samuel "Roxy" Rothafel as the musical director of the Capitol Theatre's 77-member orchestra in New York. It was at the Capitol that Rapée made his most famous classical arrangement of Franz Liszt's Hungarian Rhapsody No. 13. While at the Capitol, he pioneered orchestral radio broadcasts from the theatre over station WEAF, beginning with him conducting the Capitol Grand Orchestra (as it was called) in the first known broadcast of Richard Strauss's tone poem Ein Heldenleben on Sunday evening, 19 November 1922 as part of the Capitol's pre-feature film multi-act stage presentation, which was announced over the air by Rothafel himself. This was the first of what eventually became the Roxy's Gang programs, a two-hour weekly variety show hosted by Rothafel using Capitol and, later, Roxy Theatre artistes, broadcast every Sunday evening starting at 7:20 p.m., first from an improvised basement studio at the Capitol and later from a purpose-built studio at the Roxy. Rapée also engaged Eugene Ormandy, whom he had known in his youth as a fellow music student in Budapest, as the Capitol's concertmaster and assistant conductor; Ormandy eventually became musical director of the Roxy's Gang broadcasts. The Capitol orchestra made a number of commercial acoustical recordings (and one released electrical recording, using the Pallophotophone process) under Rapée and associate conductor David Mendoza (who succeeded Rapée as chief conductor in late 1923) for the Brunswick-Balke-Collender Company between 1923 and 1926, while Ormandy made a number of acoustical and electrical solo violin records as "Concertmaster of the Capitol Theatre Orchestra, New York" for Cameo Records.

Rapée's next move was to Philadelphia, where he conducted an orchestra of 68 at the Fox Theatre. Percy Grainger was one of his guest artists during this engagement. After his tenure at the Fox, Rapée went on to international success in Berlin with an orchestra of 85 at the Ufa-Palast am Zoo. While there he was invited to conduct the Berlin Philharmonic Orchestra in a concert. Later he appeared as conductor of the Budapest Philharmonic Orchestra and other European orchestras.

In 1926, he returned to America after notable European successes. He began an engagement at the Roxy Theatre in New York, opening the theater in March 1927, as music director of its 110-player Roxy Symphony Orchestra. (At the time this was world's largest permanent orchestra, outnumbering the New York Philharmonic by three musicians). Millions of listeners heard his symphonic concerts over the air on Sunday afternoon during The Roxy Hour radio broadcasts, and he also conducted for the General Motors Concerts.

Finally, in 1932, Rapée reached the apex of his career as the musical director and head conductor of the symphony orchestra at Roxy Rothafel's new Radio City Music Hall, a position Rapée held until his death in New York City, New York, from a heart attack on June 26, 1945.

== Compositions ==
During his years conducting for silent films on Broadway, Rapée arranged and composed a bulk of his library. In 1923, Robbins-Engel Music began publishing the music of Rapée and his associates under the banner of the "Capitol Photoplay Series". Under their "Gold Seal" series (carefully selected pieces chosen to be printed on high-quality paper), his song "When Love Comes Stealing" was published the same year. Five years later, it became the theme song of the Paul Leni film, The Man Who Laughs.

== Film music ==
Collaborating with Dr. William Axt, Rapée co-wrote an eminent collection of photoplay music, which included a series of three Agitatos, Appassionato No. 1, Debutante, Frozen North, Screening Preludes 1 and 2 and Tender Memories. Other pieces written solo included The Clown's Carnival and Pollywog's Frolic.

In 1926, Rapée collaborated with composer Lew Pollack on "Charmaine" for the film, What Price Glory? (1926), "Diane", for the Fox Film production, Seventh Heaven (1927), and "Marion" for the Fox production 4 Devils (1928). Rapée and Pollack's songs were covered by Mantovani, Frank Sinatra, Jim Reeves and numerous other artists, including 1960s hits for the Irish M-O-R group The Bachelors.

== Publications ==
Rapée also wrote several music books that were first published in the 1920s. The following are still in print:

- Encyclopedia of Music for Pictures, Belwin, NY, 1925. Reprinted in 1970 by the Arno Press. ISBN 0-405-01634-4
- Motion Picture Moods for Pianists and Organists, G. Schirmer, NY, 1924. Reprinted in 1974 by the Arno Press. ISBN 0-405-01635-2

== Selected filmography ==
- Nero (1922)
- The Iron Horse (1924), uncredited
- A Waltz Dream (1925)
- The Brothers Schellenberg (1926)
- When She Starts, Look Out (1926)
- The Prince and the Dancer (1926)
- Whispering Winds (1929)
- The Bachelor's Club (1929)
- The Dance Goes On (1930)
- The Right of Way (1931)
- Conquer by the Clock (1942)
