= Samuel Roxy Rothafel =

American theatrical impresario (1882–1936)

Samuel "Roxy" Rothafel
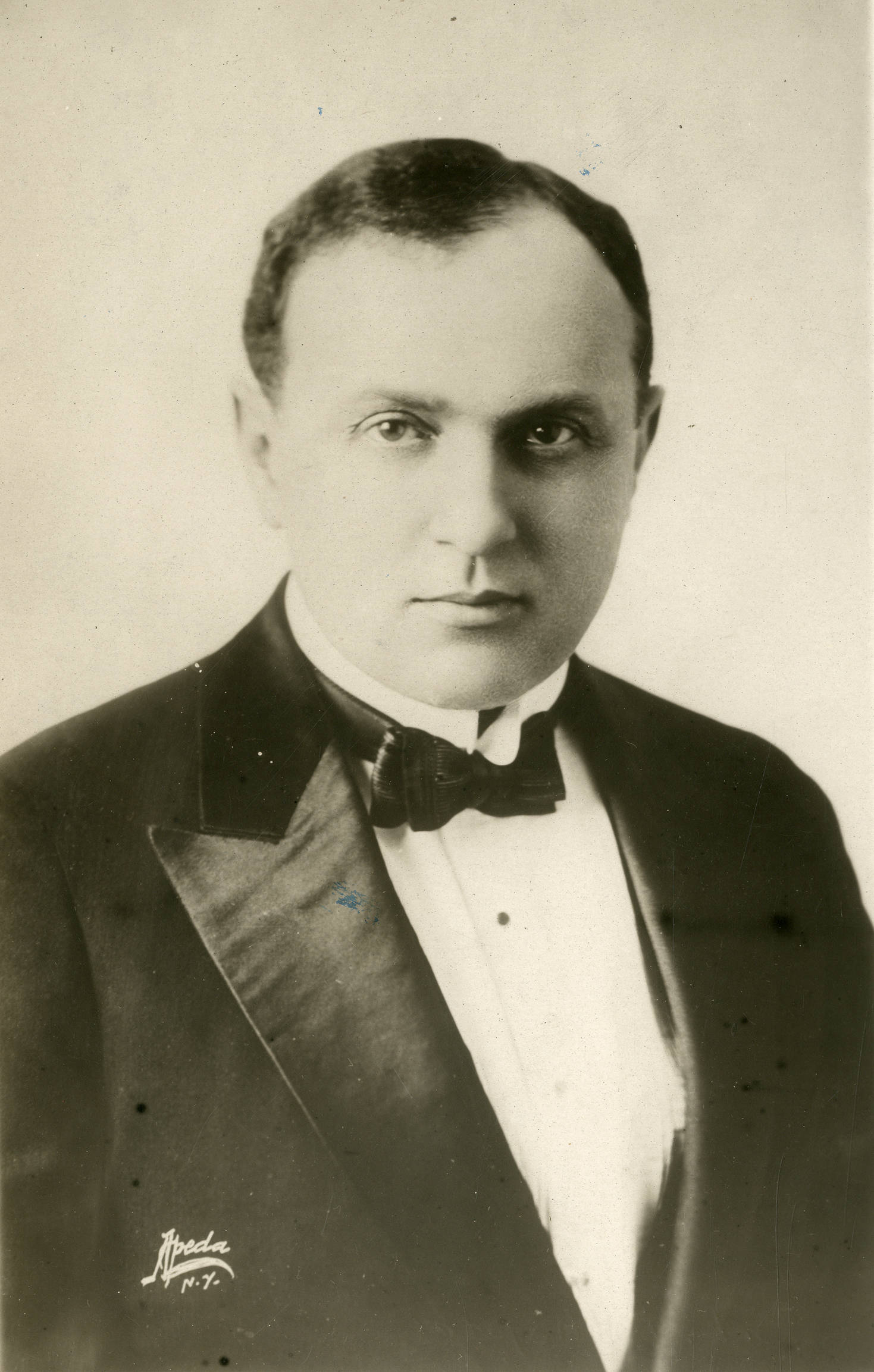
- Born: Samuel Lionel Rothapfel; July 9, 1882; Prussia
- Died: January 13, 1936 (aged 53); New York City, US
- Occupation: Theatrical impresario
- Spouse: Rosa Freedman
- Children: 2
- Relatives: Amanda Peet (great-granddaughter)

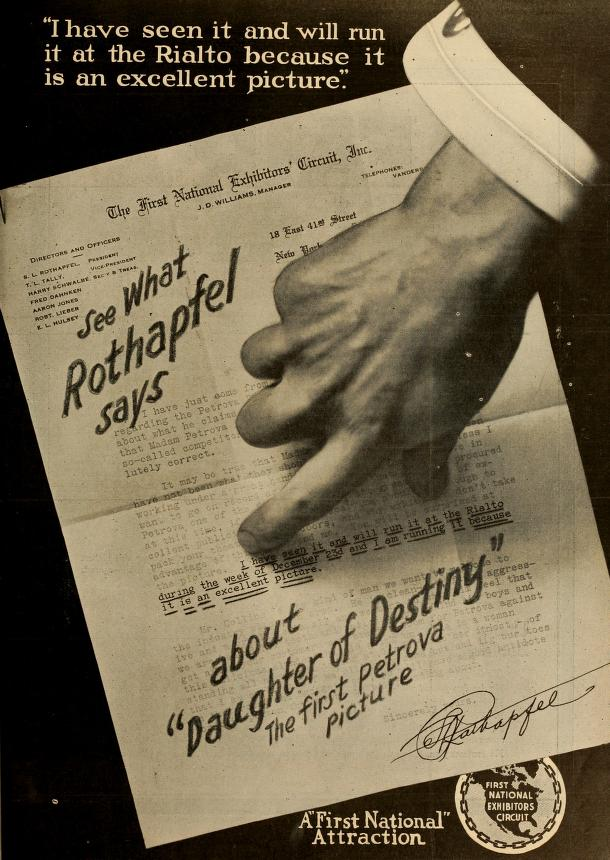
Advertisement for Daughter of Destiny (1917) starring Olga Petrova

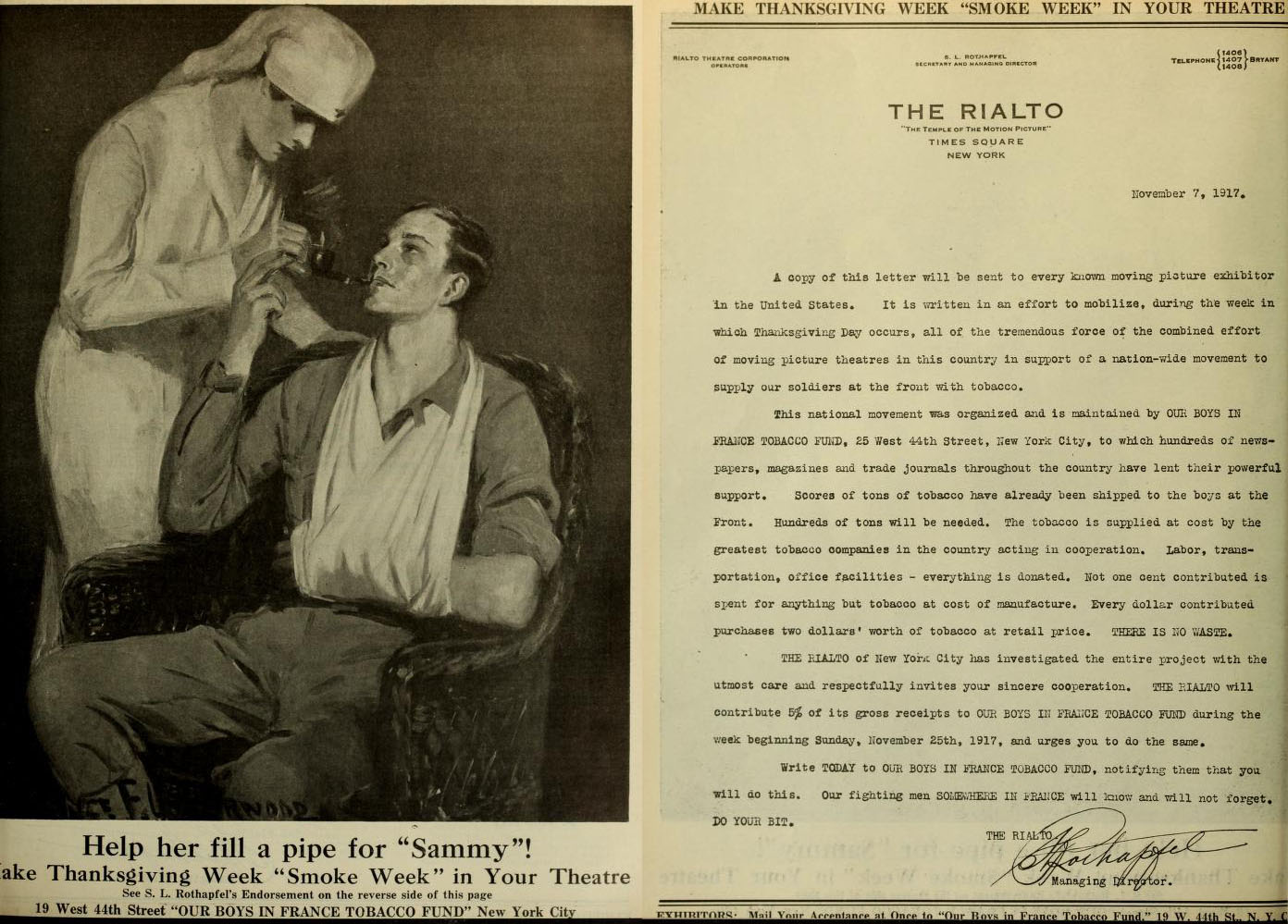
Smoke week (1917), letter by Rothafel

Samuel Lionel "Roxy" Rothafel (July 9, 1882 – January 13, 1936) was an American theatrical impresario and entrepreneur. He is noted for developing the lavish presentation of silent films in the deluxe movie palace theaters of the 1910s and 1920s.

== Life and career ==
Samuel Rothafel (originally Rothapfel, meaning ‘‘Red Apple’’, the modern German spelling is: Rotapfel) was born in Bromberg, Province of Posen, Prussia, Germany, (now Bydgoszcz, Poland), and was the son of Cecelia (née Schwerzens) and Gustav Rothapfel. In 1886, at the age of three, he and his mother boarded the S/S Rugia, sailing from Hamburg to the Port of New York on May 24, 1886. In that same year, Rothafel and his parents moved to Stillwater, Minnesota. In 1895 at the age of thirteen, Rothafel moved to New York with his family. He became estranged from his father when he lost interest in his studies and nearly two years after his mother’s death in 1897, he was forced out of his father’s house. Before setting out to create and establish notable movie theaters in New York City, Rothafel pursued any job he could get to make ends meet. He served seven years in the U.S Marine Corps where he saw action in China’s Boxer Rebellion. After being discharged Rothafel moved back to Philadelphia as a decorated marine. Samuel Rothafel is best known by his nickname, "Roxy." He was the impresario who brought the great New York City movie palaces that he managed to fame and popular success.

In 1908 he first began his show business career in Forest City, Pennsylvania, where he created the "Family Theater", a combination cinema and skating rink in the backroom of a local saloon. In 1912 he came to New York City, where he would achieve his greatest successes. In New York at different times he managed and produced shows at the Regent, Strand, Rialto, Rivoli, and Capitol theaters.

Often considered his greatest achievement was his eponymous Roxy Theatre at Times Square which opened March 11, 1927. He later opened the Radio City Music Hall and the RKO Roxy (later the Center Theatre) in 1932, his last theatrical project. The Music Hall featured the precision dance troupe the Roxyettes (later renamed The Rockettes), which Rothafel brought with him from the Roxy Theatre.

Rothafel has been credited with many movie presentation innovations, including synchronizing orchestral music to movies (in the silent film era) and having multiple projectors to effect seamless reel changes. The book The Best Remaining Seats by Ben M. Hall (1961), gives a good overview of the movie palaces of the 1920s and, specifically, of Roxy himself.

Roxy grew up with a Jewish background that continued to influence him throughout his life. In 1923 a journalist noted that Rothafel's the Regent Roxy theater attempted to appeal to Jewish audiences with its spectacular music capabilities. Roxy also hired Hungarian Jewish violinist Eugene Ormandy to play and conduct in his theaters, which boosted Ormandy's career. Roxy was also the target of anti-semitism, as seen in the diary of American author Theodore Dreiser who wrote: “clever Jew who has become managing director of three great movie houses in New York,'' as well as other racial slurs after Dreiser made a 1916 visit to one of Roxy’s theaters.

Rothafel had health issues in his later life, mainly angina pectoris. He died of a heart attack in his sleep on January 13, 1936, in New York City aged 53. He is buried in Linden Hill Jewish Cemetery in Queens, New York.

His wife was Rosa Freedman. His son was Arthur Ingram Rothafel, journalist, writer and ski reporter. His daughter, Beta Rothafel, married Lawrence Harold Levy, the son of Samuel Levy, a New York City lawyer, businessman, and public official, who served as Manhattan borough president. Through Rothafel's granddaughter, Penny (Levy), he is the great-grandfather of actress Amanda Peet.

=== Radio ===
Roxy also made a name for himself on network radio, where he began broadcasting in mid-November 1922. Through 1925, live broadcasts of his weekly variety show, Roxy and His Gang from the Capitol Theatre (New York City), became increasingly popular. One estimate from 1924 placed his typical radio audience at about five million listeners, and he was said to receive thousands of pieces of fan mail weekly. After Rothafel left the Capitol, his radio show, now known as The Roxy Hour, was broadcast from the new Roxy Theatre on NBC's Blue Network from 1927 to 1932.
