= Center Theatre (New York City) =

Former theatre in Manhattan, New York

- Interactive map of Center Theatre
- Former names: RKO Roxy Theatre
- Address: 1230 Sixth Avenue
- Location: New York City
- Coordinates: 40.7587°N 73.9806°W
- Owner: Rockefeller Center
- Capacity: 3,500
- Type: Broadway

Construction
- Opened: 29 December 1932
- Demolished: 1954
- Architect: Edward Durrell Stone

The Center Theatre was a theater located at 1230 Sixth Avenue, the southeast corner of West 49th Street in Rockefeller Center in New York City. Seating 3,500, it was originally designed as a movie palace in 1932 and later achieved fame as a showcase for live musical ice-skating spectacles. It was demolished in 1954, the only building in the original Rockefeller Center complex to have been torn down.

== History ==
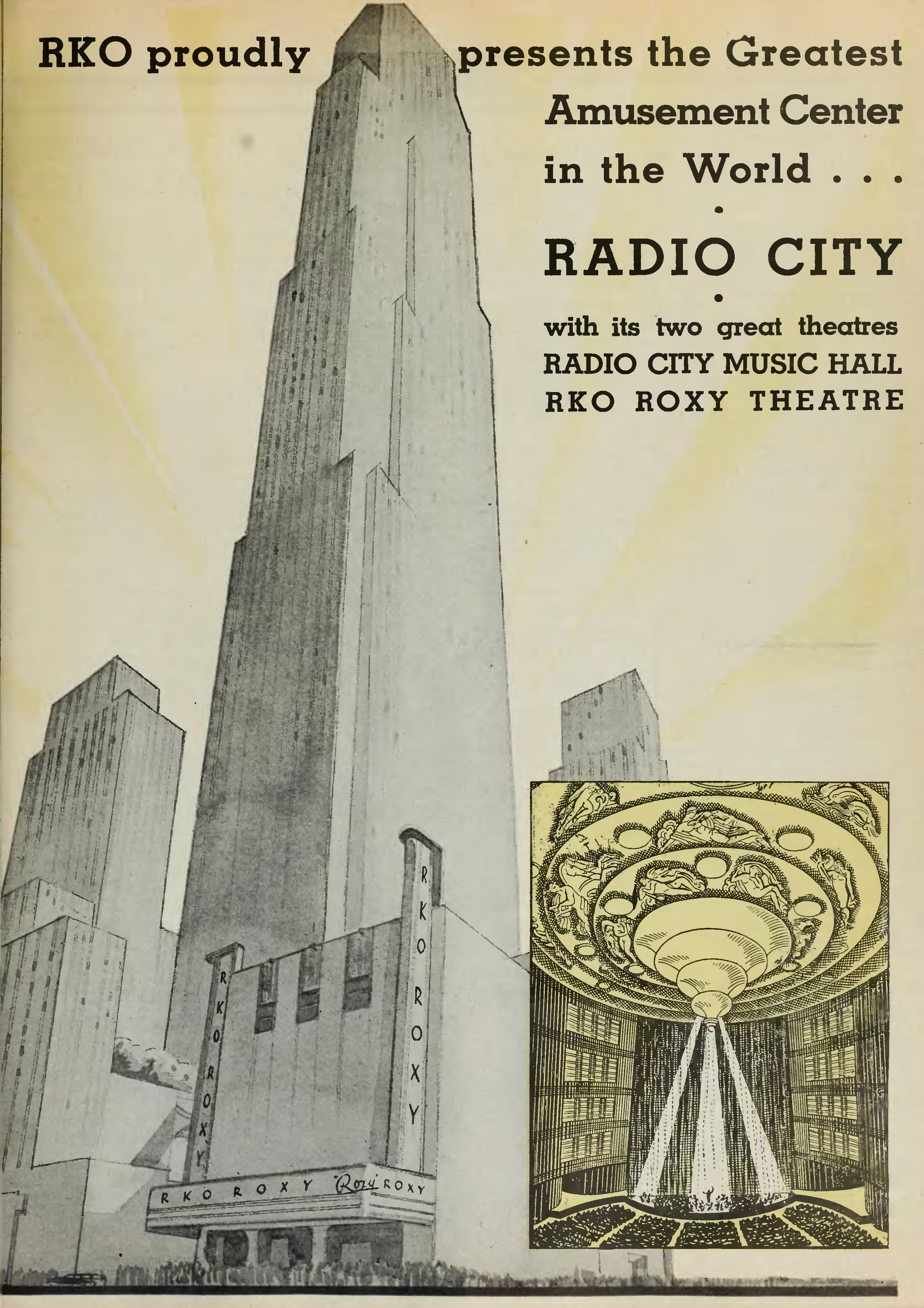
Radio City - RKO Roxy Theatre ad from, The Film Daily, 1932

The Center Theatre was originally called the RKO Roxy Theatre and built as part of the construction of Rockefeller Center. The RKO Roxy started construction in November 1931, and it opened December 29, 1932 with the RKO film The Animal Kingdom and a live stage show. It was intended as a smaller sister to the 6,000 seat Radio City Music Hall one block away, which at first did not show films. The smaller theater was named after producer Samuel L. Rothafel, aka "Roxy", who was engaged by Rockefeller Center to supervise the design and operation of the two theaters. After the initial failure of the Music Hall in its first weeks, Rothafel suffered a heart attack and never returned to his new theaters. A successful lawsuit in 1933 by the owners of the original Roxy Theatre on Seventh Avenue, claiming ownership of the "Roxy" name, caused the new theater to be renamed the RKO Center.

The Center Theatre featured an elegant Art Deco design which was muted by comparison to the lavish Radio City Music Hall. The architect was Edward Durrell Stone and decor was by Eugene Schoen. The spare but striking design featured curved walls paneled in mahogany. It had a three-tiered metal chandelier weighing six tons, and a ceiling studded with circles decorated in half-relief with mythological figures. Three shallow mezzanines provided an unobstructed view of the stage. The large stage contained turn-screw lifts as did the orchestra pit. There was also a 34-rank Wurlitzer theatre organ with a single stained wood console at stage right similar to the Radio City Wurlitzer twin consoles which were finished in ebony. Betty Gould and Raymond Bohr were some of the organ's featured artists.

Originally operated by the RKO movie theater chain, the center was soon overshadowed in the movie business by the hugely popular Music Hall. In 1934 it converted to presenting Broadway plays and musicals. Now called the Center Theatre, it offered The Great Waltz and a few other shows but the theater was too large to find lasting success in this venture either. In 1939 the theatre presented the world premiere of Eugene Zador's opera Christopher Columbus.

The last feature film to play at the theatre was Walt Disney's Pinocchio in 1940.

Looking for a way to make the Center Theatre profitable, Rockefeller Center, inspired by the theatrical success of figure-skating champion Sonja Henie, converted it into a theater expressly designed for the presentation of musical ice shows. This venture was headed by G.S. Eyssell, executive manager of Rockefeller Center, and Arthur M. Wirtz, of Chicago.

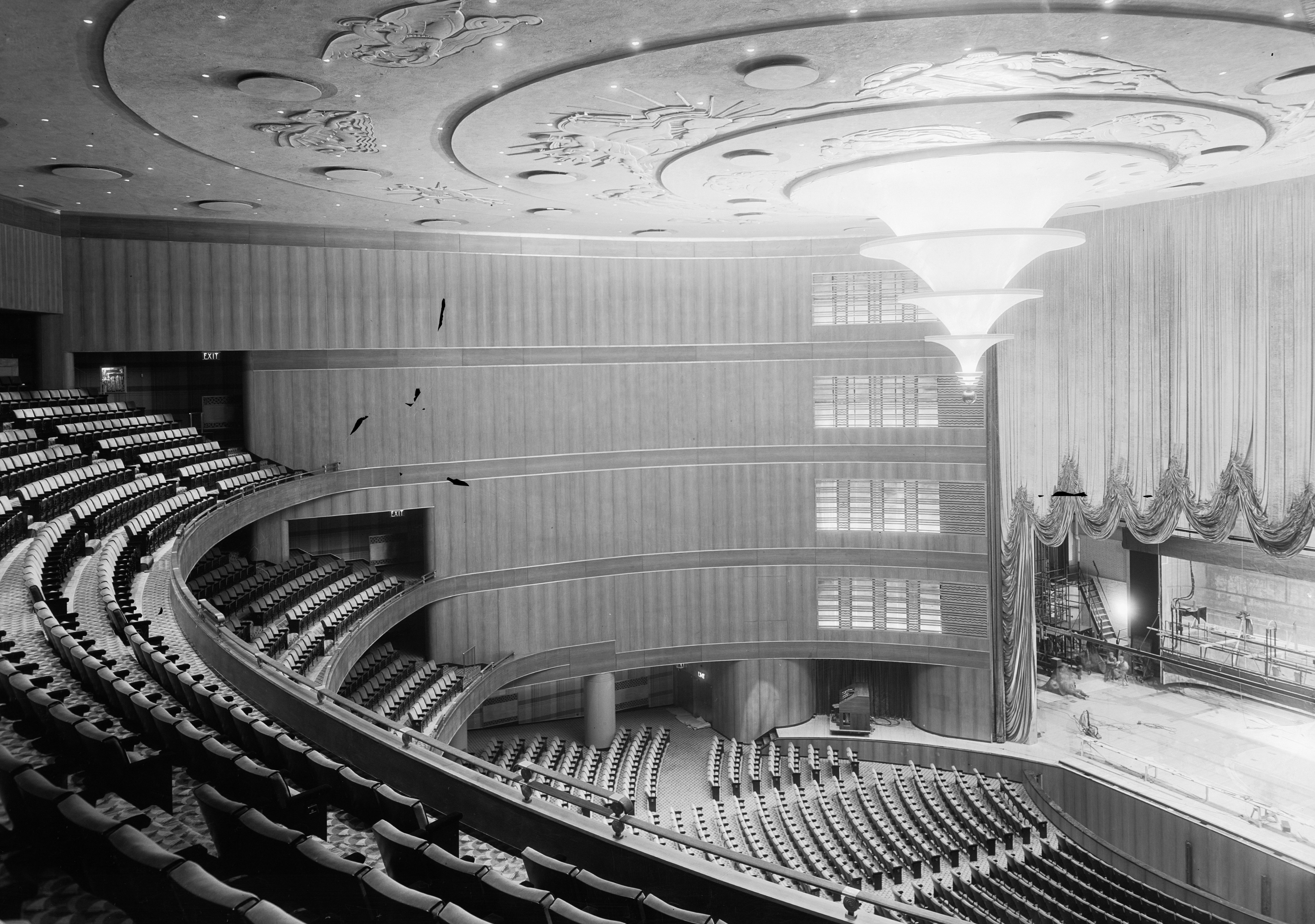
RKO Roxy Theatre, 49th Street, New York, N.Y., 1932

An ice stage 100 feet (30 m) wide with a skating surface of 7,000 square feet (650 m^{2}) was built in the theater. Beneath it 28,000 feet (8,500 m) of pipe were laid, capable of continuously circulating a freezing solution at the rate of 500 US gallons per minute (1,900 L/min). For the surface, specially designed ice-making machinery was installed. The result was a permanent frozen stage surface that was ideal for skating.

As an ice theater, the Center Theatre reopened on October 10, 1940, with the presentation of Sonja Henie's production, It Happens on Ice, first of the musical ice spectacles. This proved to be a popular new form of entertainment. The show was a huge success, attracting greater than 1.5 million people during its run. For the next several years the Center offered more ice spectacles produced by Henie and Wirtz, including: Stars on Ice, Hats Off to Ice, Icetime, and Howdy Mr. Ice. In addition, during this time the center was the home for the spring season of the San Carlo Opera Company from 1944 to 1949.

The Center Theatre had never been able to become a consistently profitable venture for Rockefeller Center. In 1951, the theatre was leased by NBC and became a venue for live television broadcasts. Many early programs, including The Voice of Firestone and Your Show of Shows, were broadcast from the Center Theatre. Two years later, the United States Rubber Company indicated that it wanted to expand the U.S. Rubber Company Building above the Center Theatre, meaning that the theater had to be closed and demolished to make way for the extra office space.

After 21 years of operation, the Center Theatre was demolished in 1954 and replaced with a 19-story addition to the U.S. Rubber Company Building. The final production at the theatre was the New York portion of the 1954 Academy Awards, when Audrey Hepburn won Best Actress for Roman Holiday. During the demolition process, the U.S. Rubber Building above it was put on temporary stilts, with the offices above the former theater still being occupied during the demolition process. Doors, lamps, and other furnishings were sold off to the Cherry Lane Theatre in the West Village. Bob Jones University purchased the stage lifts and turntables from the Center Theatre and reassembled them in its Rodeheaver Auditorium, where the mechanisms are still in use today.

== Bibliography ==
- Hall, Ben M. (1961). The Best Remaining Seats; The Story of the Golden Age of the Movie Palace. New York: Clarkson N. Potter. OCLC 587933.
- Okrent, Daniel (2003). Great Fortune: The Epic of Rockefeller Center. New York: Viking Press. ISBN 0-670-03169-0.
