= Eugene Zador =

Hungarian and American composer (1894–1977)

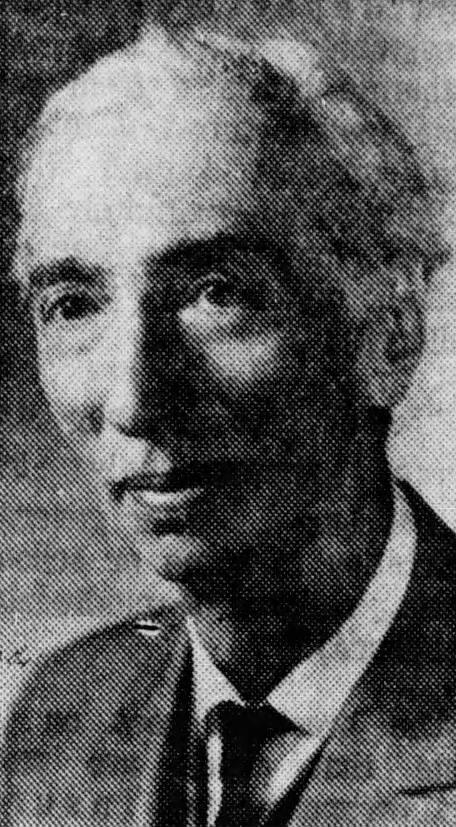
Eugene Zador, circa early 1970s

Eugene Zador (born Jenő Zádor; 5 November 1894, Bátaszék, Hungary – 4 April 1977, Hollywood, California) was a Hungarian and American composer.

== Life ==
Born into a Jewish family, his parents were Paula Biermann and József Zádor (originally Zucker) .

He studied at the Vienna Music Academy and in Leipzig with Max Reger. He taught from 1921 at the new New Vienna Conservatory and later at the Budapest Academy of Music. Fearful for his safety due to his Jewish identity, he left Austria on the day of the Anschluss to return to Hungary. He actively sought employment in the United States out of fear of the rise of Nazi Germany, and was able to successfully earn a post on the faculty of the New York College of Music. The college was able to obtain an American visa for him, and he sailed to America in 1939. On that voyage he composed the music to his opera Christopher Columbus.

In addition to teaching in New York City, he also found employment in the music department of Metro-Goldwyn-Mayer (M-G-M). He composed (anonymously) music for a number of film scores, but regarded his movie work as merely supportive of his own creative activity. For this reason he preferred to work at home on the orchestration of other composers' music. The most notable collaboration was with his fellow Hungarian Miklós Rózsa, with whom he worked (mostly uncredited) until 1961.

Zádor was married to Maria Steiner in Geneva during 1946 and had a son, Leslie, and a daughter, Peggy.

== Music ==
Zádor wrote a number of operas in which the characterization and orchestration are worthy of note. He claimed to occupy a position "exactly between La Traviata and Lulu". His orchestral pieces are written in a late romantic style that owed something to Max Reger and Richard Strauss. They include the popular Hungarian Caprice (1935) and concertos for such instruments as the cimbalom (1969) and accordion (1972). He had a particular affinity for composing works in variation form based on Hungarian folk motifs, following in the tradition of Franz Liszt.

=== Operas ===
- Diana (1923)
- A holtak szigete (1928)
- Revisor (1928)
- X-mal Rembrandt (1930)
- The Awaking of Sleeping Beauty (1931)
- Asra (1936)
- Christoph Columbus (1939)
- The Virgin and the Fawn (24 October 1964)
- The Magic Chair (1966)
- The Scarlet Mill (1968)
- Revisor [rev] (1971)
- Yehu, a Christmas Legend (1974)

=== Orchestral ===
- Symphony No. 1, Romantic (1922)
- Variations on a Hungarian Folksong (1927)
- Symphony No. 2, Sinfonia Tecnica (1931)
- Rondo for Orchestra (1933)
- Hungarian Capriccio (1935)
- Symphony No. 3, Dance Symphony (1936)
- Csárdás Rhapsody (1940)
- A Children’s Symphony (1941)
- Divertimento for Strings (1954)
- Elegie and Dance (1954)
- Festival Overture (1963)
- Five Contrasts (1963)
- Concerto for trombone and orchestra (1966)
- Aria and Allegro (1967)
- Rhapsody for cimbalom and orchestra (1969)
- Studies for Orchestra (1969)
- Accordion Concerto (1973)
- Oboe Concerto (1975)

=== Chamber ===
- Piano Quintet (1933)
- Hungarian Fantasy (1939) for violin and piano
- Suite for Brass Instruments (1961)
- Suite for 8 Celli (1966)
- Suite for Woodwind Quintet (1972)
- Berceuse for violin and piano (1972)
- Brass Quintet (1973)

=== Choral ===
- Cantata tecnica (1961)
- Scherzo domestica (1961)
- Triptych (1964)
