= Estelle Liebling =

American soprano and composer (1880–1970)

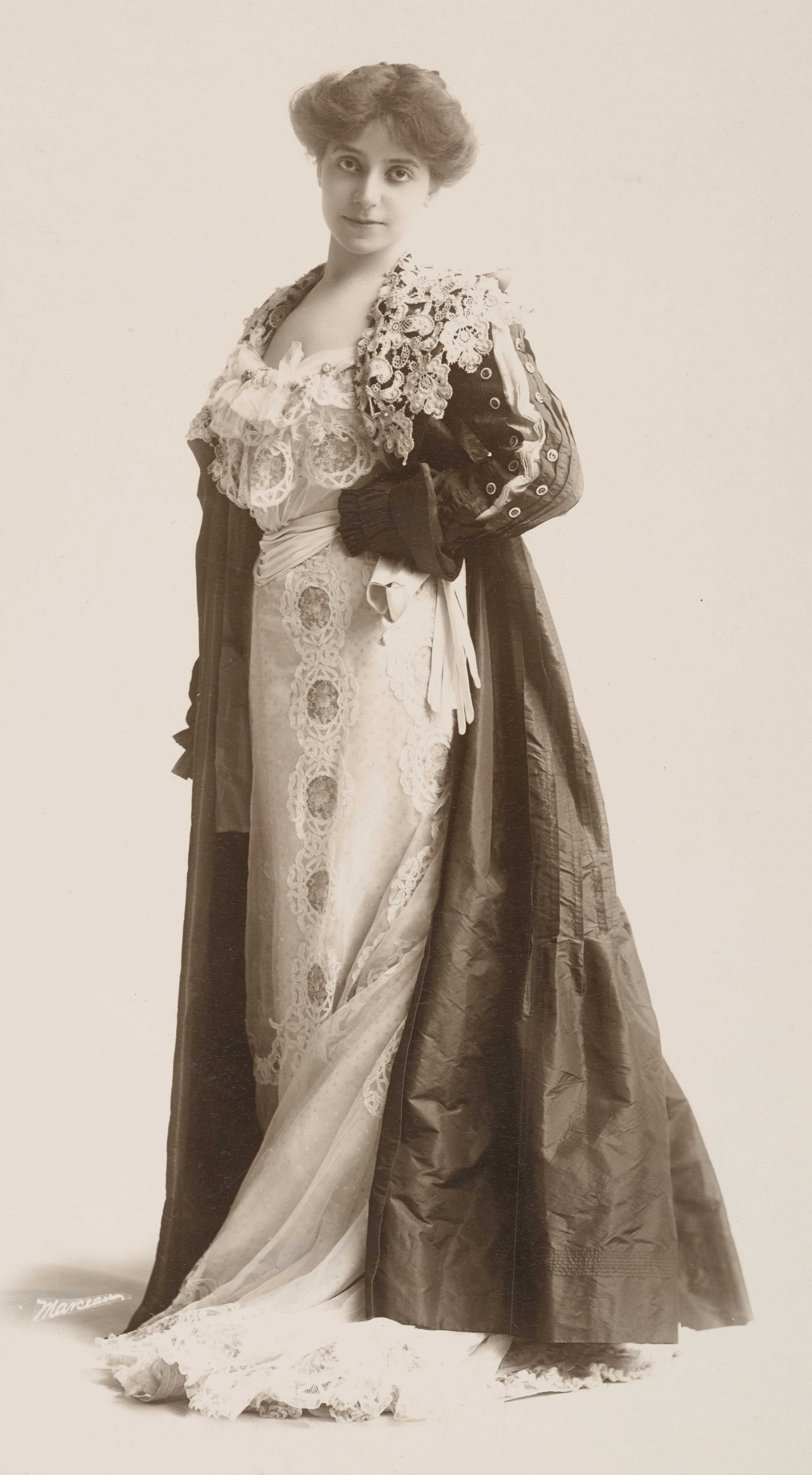
- Estelle Liebling, c. 1904 (Newberry Library, Chicago)
- Born: April 21, 1880; New York City, U.S.
- Died: September 25, 1970 (aged 90); New York City, U.S.
- Education: Stern Conservatory Hunter College
- Occupations: Soprano; Composer; Arranger; Music editor; Voice teacher; Vocal coach
- Organizations: Metropolitan Opera; G. Schirmer, Inc.; John Philip Sousa's band
- Parent(s): Max Liebling; Matilde Liebling (née de Perkiewicz)

Estelle Liebling (April 21, 1880 – September 25, 1970) was an American soprano, composer, arranger, music editor, and celebrated voice teacher and vocal coach.

Born into the Liebling family of musicians, she began her professional opera career in Dresden as a leading coloratura soprano in 1898 when she was just 18 years old. She sang with several important opera houses in Europe, including the Opéra-Comique, the Semperoper, and the Staatsoper Stuttgart. From 1902 to 1904 she was committed to the Metropolitan Opera, and from 1902 to 1905 she toured internationally in more than 1,600 concerts with John Philip Sousa and his band. After her marriage in 1906, she performed only occasionally in the succeeding two decades.

Liebling began her teaching career in the 1910s, not stopping until her death more than 50 years later. Her pedagogy was rooted in the tradition of her teacher Mathilde Marchesi. She mainly taught out of her private studio in New York City, with the exception of three years working on the faculty of the Curtis Institute of Music in the 1930s. During her career she was the vocal coach or voice teacher of 78 principal singers at the Met.

Many of her students were famous singers and entertainers or other public figures, including sopranos Beverly Sills, Amelita Galli-Curci, Maria Jeritza, Kitty Carlisle, and Margaret Truman; baritones Titta Ruffo and Alexander Sved; Wagnerian tenor Max Lorenz; dancer Adele Astaire; actresses Joan Crawford, Gertrude Lawrence, and Meryl Streep; socialite Irene Mayer Selznick; and Hollywood gossip queen Louella Parsons.

Liebling composed, edited, and arranged music for singers, most often for coloratura sopranos, but also for other voices. A prolific arranger and editor of vocal music for the music publisher G. Schirmer, Inc. and the author of several influential vocal pedagogy texts, she is considered one of the most influential voice instructors and vocal pedagogy authors of the 20th century.

In particular, her influence on the interpretation of coloratura soprano repertoire has had a lasting impact, with musicologist Sean M. Parr stating that Liebling "codified many traditional coloratura cadenzas".

== Early life and opera career ==
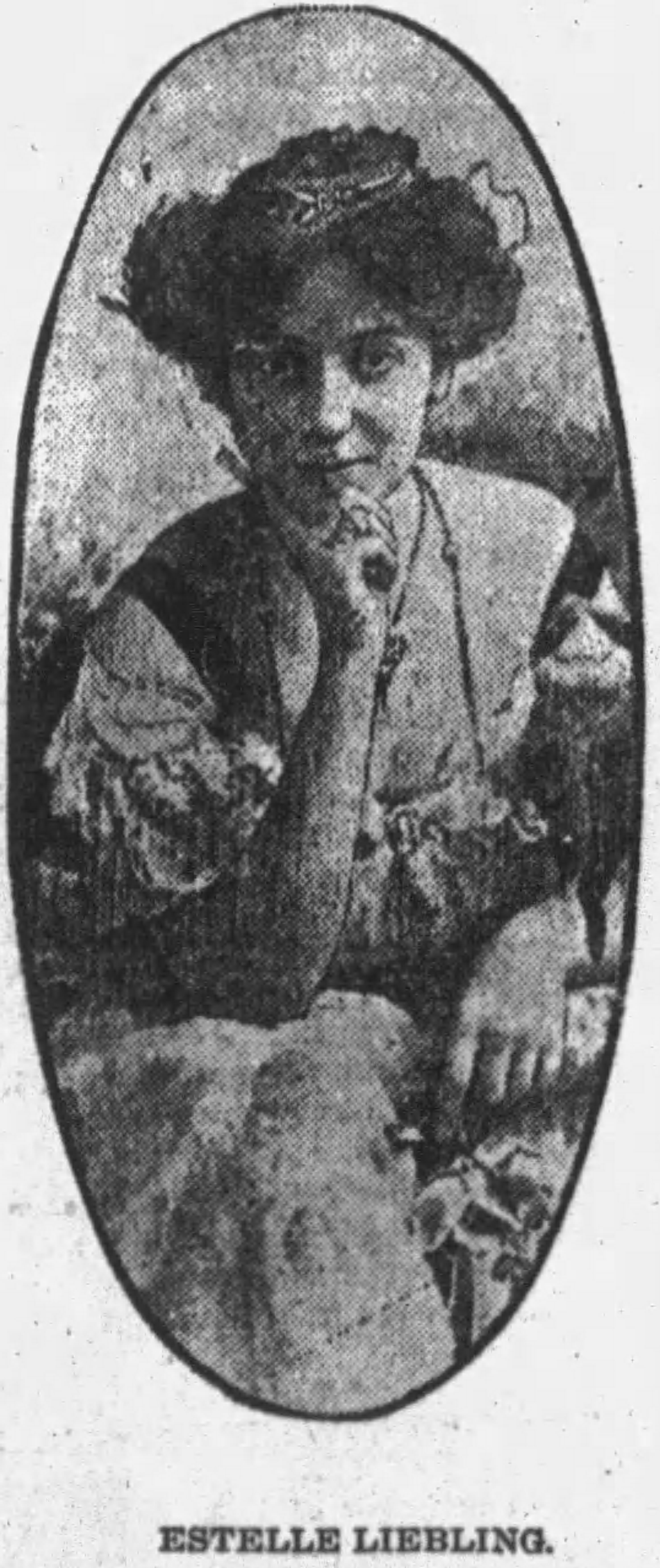
Estelle Liebling, 1901

Born into a Jewish family on 57th Street in New York City, Liebling was the daughter of composer Max Liebling (1845–1927) and Matilde Liebling (née de Perkiewicz). Her father and his three brothers, George, Emil, and Solly Liebling, were all pupils of Franz Liszt and had successful careers as pianists and composers. Two of her three brothers, James and Leonard Liebling, also worked professionally as musicians. Leonard was the editor of the Musical Courier for many years and had trained as a pianist with Leopold Godowsky. After initial studies as a pianist, she studied singing with soprano and vocal pedagogue Selma Nicklass-Kempner at the Stern Conservatory in Berlin. Listening to advice from Nellie Melba, she continued further studies with Melba's teacher mezzo-soprano Mathilde Marchesi in Paris. She was a graduate of Hunter College.

Liebling made her professional opera debut in September 1900 at the Semperoper in Dresden as the title heroine in Gaetano Donizetti’s Lucia di Lammermoor. She performed other coloratura soprano roles at that opera house, including Rosina in Rossini's The Barber of Seville and the Queen of the Night in Mozart's The Magic Flute. Speaking of her early experiences in Dresden to Quaintance Eaton of Opera News in 1969, Liebling stated:

"The entire company apparently joined in a cabal against me because of an injudicious item printed by Henry Krehbiel in the New York Tribune to the effect that I would replace Erika Wedekind in Dresden. Marcella Sembrich, who lived there, snubbed me cruelly, and the conductor and singers would hardly speak to me. It took all my grit to carry through my debut as Lucia and subsequent performances as Queen of the Night and Rosina."

Liebling also performed leading roles with the Opéra-Comique and the Staatsoper Stuttgart before returning to the United States to make her debut at the Metropolitan Opera (Met) as Marguerite de Valois in Meyerbeer's Les Huguenots on February 24, 1902. She returned to the Met in 1903 as Musetta in Puccini's La bohème with Marcella Sembrich as Mimì, Enrico Caruso as Rodolfo, Giuseppe Campanari as Marcello, and Arturo Vigna conducting. She was heard again at the Met in 1904 as a Flower Maiden in Richard Wagner's Parsifal and as the 2nd Genie in Mozart's The Magic Flute.

== Work with Sousa ==
Liebling became a favored soprano of John Philip Sousa after her manager, Henry Wolfsohn, managed to successfully promote her as an artist to him. Wolfsohn convinced Sousa to buy another singer out of her contract in order to engage Liebling for his 1902 fall tour. She first sang with Sousa and his band in Atlantic City for matinee and evening performances on Saturday, August 9, 1902, in which she performed Benjamin Godard’s Chanson de Florian, Alexander Alyabyev's Solovey, and the mad scene from Donizetti's Lucia di Lammermoor. She traveled throughout the United States and Europe as a soprano soloist with Sousa's band from 1902 to 1905 in over sixteen hundred concerts in nine tours. Her first tour was in the fall of 1902 for performances in the Midwestern United States. One of the stops on that tour was at Tomlinson Hall in Indianapolis in which she performed "The Bell Song" from Delibes' Lakmé, Sousa's The Snow Baby, and Solovey on September 18, 1902. The Indianapolis Sentinel review of the performance stated:

"the audience had “save[d] its best applause for Miss Liebling” and that "Miss Liebling, who is vocal soloist this season for all of Sousa’s indoor concerts has the artistic temperament, is magnetic, is endowed with a pure soprano voice of exceptional range and adequate power, and is blessed with a most attractive stage presence. [She] displayed warmth, refinement, and finesse. No singer who has appeared in Indianapolis for many seasons has more easily and completely captivated her audience."

From January through July 1903 Liebling toured Europe with Sousa, performing much of the same repertoire she had performed earlier with the band. She was particularly admired for her performances of one new aria, "Charmant oiseau" from Felicien David’s La perle du Brésil which was a showpiece for both her coloratura soprano and Sousa band flutist Marshall Lufsky. The tour began with performances at the Queen's Hall in London from January 2 to 11. This was proceeded by performances in Brighton, Reading, Swindon, Stratford-on-Avon, and Leamington over the next five days. On January 17 a private performance was given at Warwick Castle for Francis Greville, 5th Earl of Warwick and Daisy Greville, Countess of Warwick and their guests. On January 31 they performed for King Edward VII at Windsor Castle. Speaking of that experience, Liebling stated,

" A command performance at Windsor Castle for King Edward VII was the thrill of my young life. We were punctual of course, but His Majesty dawdled over a pinochle game and didn't show up for what seemed hours. It was an all-American program except for our solos - my 'Charmant Oiseau' from David's Perle de Bresil and Maud Powell's 'Zigeunerweisen'. Maud was already considered the leading woman violin virtuoso in the world. The King asked for encores. Naturally the band played 'The Stars and Stripes Forever' - they were never allowed to get away without it. I used to stand in the wings and warm up by singing along with the flutes. Sousa always seemed amused."

Liebling and the Sousa band continued to perform in Britain through the middle of April and then proceeded to Paris where they performed a series of concerts beginning on April 19, 1903. This was followed by performances in other European cities in Austria, Belgium, Germany, Holland, Poland, and Russia over the next few months. They returned to Britain in July 1903 for performances in England, Ireland, and Wales for the conclusion of the European tour. A reviewer in the Burton Mail of Liebling's performance on her British tour stated:

"[She] possesses a soprano voice of unusual brilliancy and flexibility, and with a very wide compass...clear flute-like quality...and she tripped up and down the chromatic scales and gave the trying staccato passages with no more apparent difficulty than the brilliant bird she was supposed to imitate."

After a month off, Liebling rejoined Sousa and his band for another fall tour in the United States which began in Willow Grove, Pennsylvania, on August 30, 1903. Stops along this tour included appearances at the Cincinnati Fall Festival, the Indiana State Fair, and a concluding run at the Pittsburgh Exposition from September 29 through October 3, 1903. New performance repertoire sung by Liebling during this tour included Sousa’s Maid of the Meadow, Voices of Spring by Johann Strauss, the aria "A vos jeux, mes amis" from Thomas's Hamlet, the aria "Legere hirondelle" from Gounod's Mireille, Ethelbert Nevin's "Mighty Lak' a Rose", and "Go To Sleep, Slumber Deep" from Victor Herbert's Babes in Toyland.

After half a year off, Liebling resumed touring with Sousa and his band in April 1904 for a nine-month-long tour of the United States. Some of the stops on this tour included the Parsons Theatre in Hartford, Connecticut; the Lyric Theatre in Baltimore; the Peck Theatre in Buffalo, New York; the St. Louis World's Fair; the Pittsburgh Exposition; the Corn Palace in Mitchell, South Dakota; the Grand Theatre in Sioux City Iowa; Convention Hall in Kansas City, Missouri; the Hazard's Pavilion in Los Angeles; and Carnegie Hall in New York City. Some new repertoire from the tour included Sousa's "Will You Love When the Lilies are Dead?"; a Sousa arrangement of the aria "O rianle nature" from Gounod's Philémon et Baucis; the aria "Una voce poco fa" from Rossini's The Barber of Seville; and the aria "Air du rossignol" from Victor Massé's Les noces de Jeannette. Reviews from this tour were mixed, with some reviewers highly complimentary and others commenting on Liebling's voice sounding tired and worn, or overpowered by Sousa's instrumentalists.

From January 6 through May 3, 1905, Liebling toured the British Isles with Sousa and his band. The tour commenced at the Philharmonic Hall, Liverpool, and featured Liebling performing Isabella's aria from Ferdinand Hérold’s Le pre aux clercs with an added flute obbligato by Marshall Lufsky and a band arrangement by Herbert L. Clarke. Some of the other stops on this tour included the Queen’s Hall in London and County Hall in Salisbury. After returning to the United States, Sousa's band performed at the Metropolitan Opera House on May 21, 1905, with Liebling singing "Where is Love?" from Sousa's operetta Chris and the Wonderful Lamp. Her final appearances with Sousa's band in 1905 were at the New York Hippodrome on June 11 and 18; the same month in which her engagement to A. R. Mosler was announced. After this point, Liebling no longer toured with Sousa, but did occasionally perform with his band in singular guest appearances through 1908.

== Later life and teaching career ==
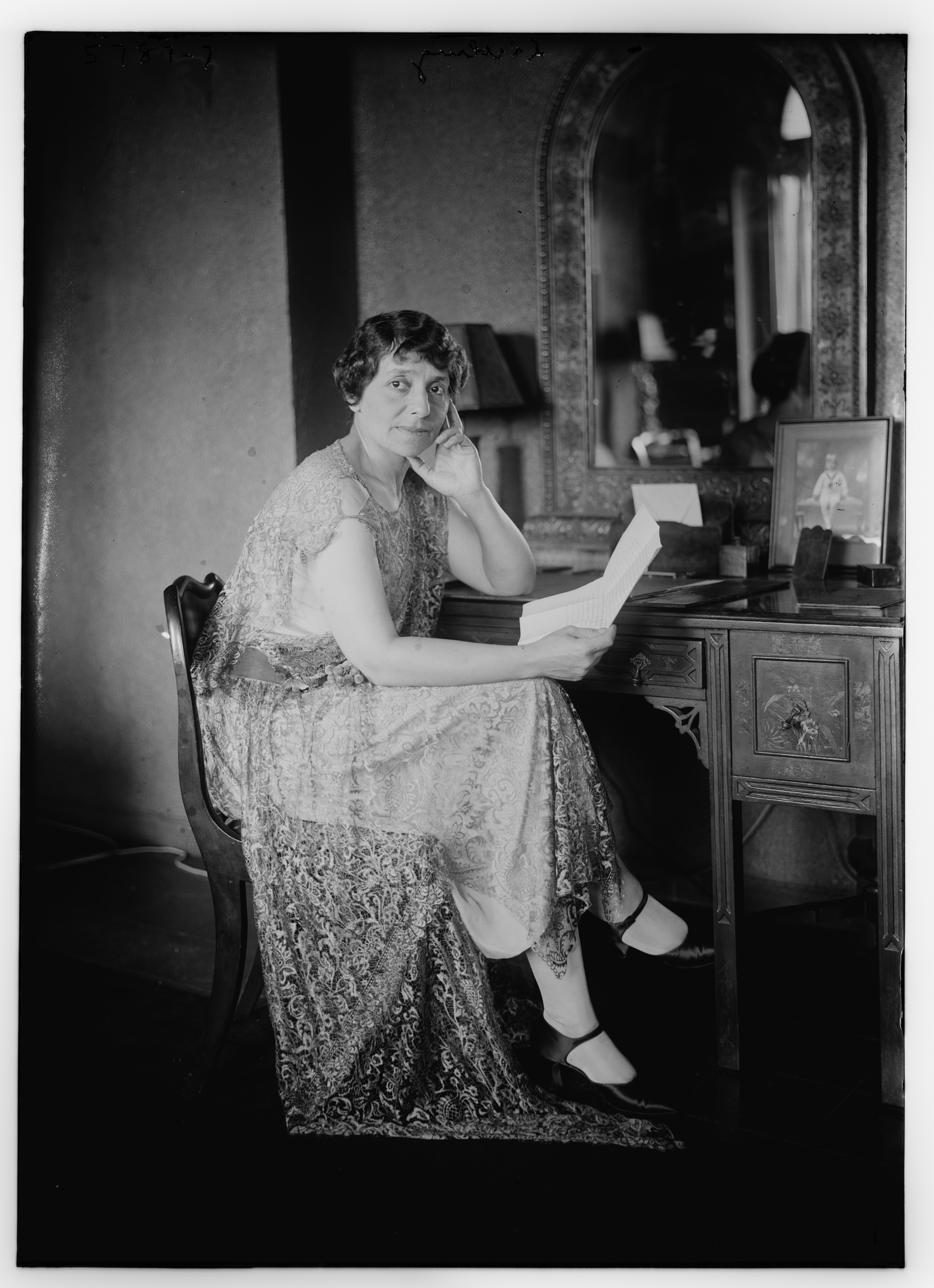
Estelle Liebling (c. 1920–1925)

In 1905 Liebling married the engineer Arthur Rembrandt Mosler, the son of painter Henry Mosler whose family owned the Mosler Safe Company. Mosler was wealthy, and the couple resided for many years in a luxurious penthouse at 145W 55th Street in the same building where Liebling later established her private voice studio on a lower floor.

After her marriage Liebling's performances became less frequent, but she continued to perform periodically for the next two decades. She served as the music director of her own ensemble, the Liebling Singers, with whom she toured the United States. She also toured as a recitalist and lecturer in addition to performing in concert literature with orchestras and working as an arranger and composer. Several encyclopedia publications name her as a soloist in concerts with prominent orchestras, although no dates are given or details of repertoire. These ensembles include the Berlin Philharmonic, Boston Symphony, Detroit Symphony, Leipzig Gewandhaus Orchestra, New York Philharmonic, New York Symphony, and Philadelphia Orchestra.

Liebling began teaching singing and coaching singers in the 1910s, and continued to do so for over 50 years. She mainly taught out of a private studio in New York City, with the exception of three years teaching as a member of the voice faculty at the Curtis Institute for Music from 1936 to 1938. She coached 78 leading singers while they were working at the Met in addition to a busy teaching load of her own students. Many of her pupils were famous, including opera singers, Broadway stars, movie stars, radio performers, and other entertainers.

In 1963 Liebling was awarded an honorary degree from Fairleigh Dickinson University. Having never retired, she died on September 25, 1970, at the Hampshire House, 150 Central Park South, in New York City at the age of 90. Her husband and their son, Arthur Jr., both predeceased her in 1953. Her only living family at the time of her death was her grandson, Henry Arthur Mosler, and her great-granddaughter, Alisa Beth Mosler.

== Vocal pedagogy ==
Liebling's pedagogy was rooted in the tradition of her teacher Mathilde Marchesi, and continued in the tradition of Marchesi's teacher Manuel García. She published several influential vocal pedagogy texts, including the four-volume method book The Estelle Liebling Vocal Course (1956) with each volume focusing on a different voice type and following a vocal course divided into three parts: "vocal mechanism", "vocal studies", and "diction". She utilized a three vocal register understanding of the voice mechanism: chest, medium, and head. Much of the pedagogy espoused by Liebling in these volumes is comparable to the pedagogy articulated by Marchesi in her Méthode de chant théorique et pratique (1887), and provides a written record of Liebling's continuation of Marchesi's pedagogical approach.

Other influential texts included The Estelle Liebling Coloratura Digest and a 1941 revised edition of the vocalises written by Marchesi (titled Thirty Vocalises). Columbia University musicologist Sean M. Parr stated her publications and teachings "codified many traditional coloratura cadenzas".

Beverly Sills, her most famous opera student, began her studies with Liebling in 1936 when she was just 7 years old. She stated "Miss Liebling was the last surviving pupil of Mathilde Marchesi, one of the great vocal teachers of all time. Because I was so young, Miss Liebling put me through the entire Marchesi school of singing." Sills continued to study with her up until Liebling's death 34 years later, and she described her as a demanding teacher who was strict and formal in lessons, but could also be incredibly kind and maintained an excellent sense of humor. Liebling would often come hear Sills perform at the New York City Opera, and critique what she was hearing. Sills stated,

I remember one night when she came to hear me do Marguerite in Faust, she was then ninety-one. (Note: Liebling died at the age of 90, and Sills made an error on the age of her teacher. Her performance annals indicate she was performing Faust from 1968-1970 at the New York City Opera, making Liebling's possible age between 88 and 90 at the time of this event.) Next morning at seven o'clock my telephone rang. It was Miss Liebling. 'Beverly,' she said sternly, 'that trill in the Jewel Song was very sloppy and slow. I expect you over here by ten o'clock.' I had to agree - the trill had been sloppy and slow. Exhausted as I was that morning after the performance, I got dressed, went to her studio, spent forty-five minutes with her trilling, and when I walked out I had a damned good trill.

== Pupils ==
=== Opera singers ===
- Selma Amansky
- Grace Angelau
- Tilly Barmach
- Rosemarie Brancato
- Yvonne D'Arle
- Stefano Ballarini
- Beatrice Belkin
- Josepha Chekova
- Colette D'Arville
- Mario Fiorella
- Amelita Galli-Curci
- Alfredo Gandolfi
- Rosario García Orellana
- Annunciata Garrotto
- Hope Hampton
- Frieda Hempel
- Gabrielle Hunt
- Maria Jeritza
- Walter Kirchhoff
- Miliza Korjus
- Göta Ljungberg
- Max Lorenz
- Joseph Macaulay
- Elsie MacFarlane
- Virginia MacWatters
- Dorothee Manski
- William Martin
- Conrad Mayo
- Mary Mellish
- Lucy Monroe
- Maria Müller
- Devora Nadworney
- Verna Osborne
- Grace Panvini
- Julia Peters
- Irra Petina
- Marie Rappold
- Elisabeth Rethberg
- Anne Roselle
- Titta Ruffo
- Joan Ruth
- Jane Shoaff
- Beverly Sills
- Alexander Sved
- Charlotte Symons
- Jean Tennyson
- Barbara Thorne
- June Winters
- Genia Zielinska

=== Entertainers outside opera and other famous pupils ===
- Adele Astaire
- Ralph Blane
- Kitty Carlisle
- Betty Compton
- Joan Crawford
- Artells Dickson of The Rondoliers
- Jessica Dragonette
- Doris Duke
- Eleanor French, cafe singer
- Gertrude Lawrence
- Irene Mayer Selznick
- Louella Parsons
- Joan Roberts
- Vivienne Segal
- Robert Shafer, Broadway musical actor
- Meryl Streep
- Garfield Swift
- Nina Tarasova
- Margaret Truman
- Iva Withers

== Publications by Liebling ==
=== As author ===
- Estelle Liebling and Laurence B. Ellert (1940). Music: Art Music and Literature Keep Memory Alive. Willis Music Company.
- Estelle Liebling (1943). The Estelle Liebling Coloratura Digest. G. Schirmer, Inc.
- Estelle Liebling (1944). Fifteen Arias for Coloratura Soprano. G. Schirmer, Inc.
- Estelle Liebling (1956). Bernard Whitefield (ed.). The Estelle Liebling Vocal Course for Soprano: Coloratura, Lyric and Dramatic. Chappell And Intersong Music Group.
- Estelle Liebling (1956). Bernard Whitefield (ed.). The Estelle Liebling Vocal Course for Mezzo-soprano and Contralto. Chappell And Intersong Music Group.
- Estelle Liebling (1956). Bernard Whitefield (ed.). The Estelle Liebing Vocal Course for Lyric Tenor and Dramatic Tenor. Chappell And Intersong Music Group.
- Estelle Liebling (1956). Bernard Whitefield (ed.). The Estelle Liebling Vocal Course for Baritone, Bass Baritone and Bass (basso). Chappell And Intersong Music Group.
- Estelle Liebling (1963). Ruggero Vené (ed.). The Aria: Renaissance and Baroque, from the Parisotti Collection, vol. 1 and 2. Franco Colombo.
- Estelle Liebling (1963). Diva Bravura - Coloratura and Operatic Arias. G. Schirmer, Inc.

=== As composer ===
- "Indian Love Song" (John Church Co., 1904)
- "Straussiana" on themes by Johann Strauss II for coloratura soprano and piano (Fisher, 1925)
- "Faustiana-a vocal fantasy based on ballet music from Gounod's Faust" (G. Schirmer, Inc., 1950)
- "Philomel", text by William Shakespeare (Galaxy Music Corporation, 1950)
- "Hast Thou. O Night? - A Nocturne", poetry by Eugene Field (Galaxy Music Corporation, 1952)

=== As editor or arranger ===
- "Je suis Titania" from the opera Mignon by Ambroise Thomas (G. Schirmer, Inc., 1901)
- "The Nightingale" by Aleksandr Alyabyev (G. Schirmer, Inc., 1928)
- "The Blue Danube", as sung by Mme. Amelita Galli-Curci" by composer Johann Strauss II (G. Schirmer, Inc., 1929)
- "Se saran rose" ("Springtime Waltz Song") by Luigi Arditi (G. Schirmer, Inc., 193?)
- "Ah! Je veux vivre" from the opera Romeo et Juliette by Charles Gounod (G. Schirmer, Inc., 1937)
- "II Bacio" by Luigi Arditi (G. Schirmer, Inc., 1937)
- "Les filles de Cadix" by Léo Delibes with English text by Alfred de Musset (G. Schirmer, Inc., 1938)
- "Ardon gli incensi" from the opera Lucia di Lammermoor by Gaetano Donizetti (G. Schirmer, Inc., 1938)
- "Nobles seigneurs, salut" from the opera Les Huguenots by Giacomo Meyerbeer (G. Schirmer, Inc., 1938)
- "None he loves but me - Swiss Echo Song" by Karl A.F. Eckert (G. Schirmer, Inc., 1938)
- "Una voce poco fa" from the opera The Barber of Seville by Rossini (G. Schirmer, Inc., 1938)
- "Caro nome che il mio cor" from the opera Rigoletto by Giuseppe Verdi (G. Schirmer, Inc., 1939)
- "Carnival of Venice" by Julius Benedict (G. Schirmer, Inc., 1939)
- "Mother Dear", Polish folk song with English words by Yvonne Ravell (G. Schirmer, Inc., 1939)
- "Souvenir Waltz", arrangement of Johann Strauss II's Souvenir de Nizza, Op. 200 for coloratura soprano and piano with text by Vera Bloom
- "Bocherini, Liebling Minuet", an adaptation of the minuet from Luigi Boccherini's String Quintet in E major, Op. 11, No. 5 for coloratura soprano (G. Schirmer, Inc., 1939)
- "Chant de l'almée" by Léo Delibes with English text by Philippe Gille (G. Schirmer, Inc., 1939)
- "Theme and Variations, Op. 164." by Heinrich Proch (G. Schirmer, Inc., 1940)
- Bravura Variations by Adolphe Adam (G. Schirmer, Inc., 1941)
- "Ecstacy" by Luigi Arditi (G. Schirmer, Inc., 1941)
- "No quiero casarme" (No, I'd rather be single), Spanish Folk Song (G. Schirmer, Inc., 1941)
- "The Queen of Night's Vengeance Aria" ("Der Hölle Rache kocht in meinem Herzen") from Mozart's opera The Magic Flute (G. Schirmer, Inc., 1941)
- Thirty Vocalises for High or Medium Voice, op. 32 by Mathilde Marchesi (G. Schirmer, Inc., 1941)
- "Ah! non credea mirarti ... Ah. non giunge" from the opera La Sonnambula by Vincenzo Bellini (G. Schirmer, Inc., 1942)
- "Allons vite ... Ombre légère" from the opera Dinorah by Meyerbeer (G. Schirmer, Inc., 1942)
- "Chacun le sait" from the opera from the opera La Fille du Régiment by Donizetti (G. Schirmer, Inc., 1942)
- "Par le rang et par l'opulence" from the opera La Fille du Régiment by Donizetti (G. Schirmer, Inc., 1942)
- "Ah! tardai troppo ... O luce di quest' anima" from the opera Linda di Chamounix by Donizetti (G. Schirmer, Inc., 1942)
- "Ah, fors' e lui che l'anima" from the opera La traviata by Verdi (G. Schirmer, Inc., 1942)
- "Vocal Studies in Bravura", six vocalises by Francesco Lamperti (G. Schirmer, Inc., 1942)
- "Sorta è la notte ... Ernani, involami!" from the opera Ernani by Verdi (G. Schirmer, Inc., 1943)
- "Qui la voce" from the opera I Puritani by Bellini (G. Schirmer, Inc., 1944)
- "Au bord du chemin ... Voix légère" from the opera Les noces de Jeannette by Victor Massé (G. Schirmer, Inc., 1944)
- "Should He Upbraid" by Henry Bishop (G. Schirmer, Inc., 1944)
- "Voci di Primavera - Waltz Song by Johann Strauss II (G. Schirmer, Inc., 1944)
- "Mercè, dilette amiche" from the opera I vespri siciliani by Verdi (G. Schirmer, Inc., 1946)
- "Son verain vezzosa" from the opera I Puritani Bellini (G. Schirmer, Inc., 1946)
- "O légère hirondelle" from the opera Mireille by Charles Gounod (G. Schirmer, Inc., 1947)
- "C'est bien l'air que chaque matin" from the opera L'étoile du nord by Meyerbeer (G. Schirmer, Inc., 1948)
- "Confiado Gilguerillo" from the opera Acis y Galatea by José de Cañizares (G. Schirmer, Inc., 1955)
- "I'll Be No Submissive Wife" by George Alexander Lee (G. Schirmer, Inc., 1955)
- "O riante nature" from the opera Philémon et Baucis by Charles Gounod (G. Schirmer, Inc., 1957)
- "The Legend of the Violin", an adaptation of Johannes Brahms's Hungarian Dance No. 5 for voice and piano with English text by her pupil Ralph Blane (G. Schirmer, Inc., 1958)
