= Genia Zielinska =

American soprano

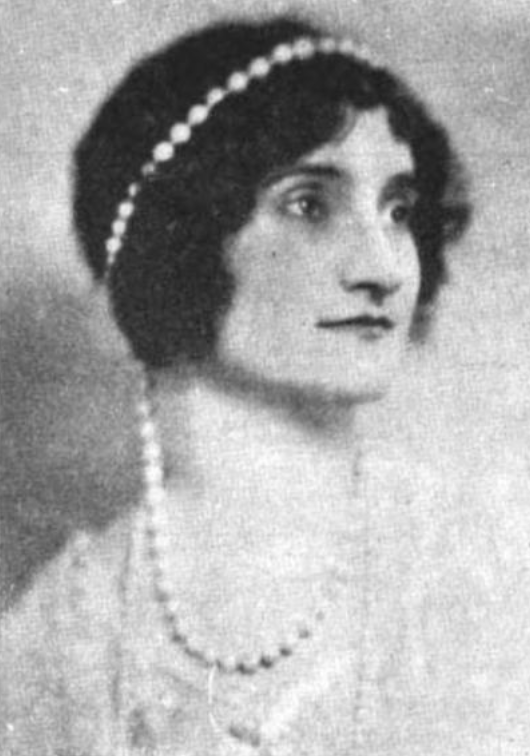
- Born: January 3, 1891; Kansas City, Kansas, U.S.
- Died: January 5, 1966 (aged 75); Kansas City, Kansas, U.S.
- Other name: Genevieve Zielinski
- Occupation: Soprano

Genia Zielinska (January 3, 1891 – January 5, 1966), born Genevieve C. Zielinski, was an American opera singer, noted for her radio performances in the 1920s and 1930s.

== Early life and education ==
Zielinska was born in Kansas City, Kansas, to Teodor Zielinski and Karolina (Caroline) Chrupowicz Zielinski. Both of her parents were Polish immigrants. Her father died when she was an infant. She trained at Chicago Musical College, and in New York with Estelle Liebling, Serge Klibansky, and Josef Pasternack.

== Career ==
Zielinska, a coloratura soprano, performed at a Red Cross benefit in 1918, with other opera singers included Eva Didur, Tamaki Miura, and Pasquale Amato.She performed at Willow Grove in Philadelphia in 1919. In 1926 she sang the part of Filina in a radio production of Mignon, with Devora Nadworney in the lead role. In 1927, she sang the title role in a radio production of Manon, and she sang the part of Zerline on a radio production of Fra Diavolo. She sang a solo on a radio variety program in 1928. "No more delightful artist has come this way this season," raved Massachusetts critic Minna Littmann that year, noting that Zielinska was "vivacious, effortless in manner, with a voice of charming quality and ample resource".

In 1929 she was one of the radio stars to appear at the Carolina Theatre in Charlotte, and she was soloist at an Illinois concert marking the sesquicentennial of Casimir Pulaski's death. In 1930 she sang the title role in Halka with the Polish Opera Company in New York. "Zielinska displayed much freshness and youthfulness, especially in the vocal rendition," according to one review of the performance. Also in 1930, she sang with a Chopin chorus at the Polish Peoples' Home in New Jersey. She was soloist at a concert of Polish folk song in Buffalo in 1933.

== Personal life ==
Zielinska lived with her unmarried older sisters Josephine and Angeline most of her life, and worked in a department store in her later years. She died in January 1966, in Kansas City, at age 75.
