= Max Liebling =

American concert pianist, composer and conductor

- Born: 1845; Duchy of Pless, Silesia
- Died: September 24, 1927 (aged 82); New York City, U.S.
- Occupations: Concert pianist; Composer; Conductor; Music educator
- Organization: The Lyra
- Children: Estelle Liebling; Leonard Liebling

Max Liebling (1845 – September 24, 1927) was a German-born American concert pianist, composer, conductor, and music educator. He was the patriarch of a prominent Jewish American musical family in New York City. Several of his children had successful careers in music, including the Metropolitan Opera soprano and vocal pedagogue Estelle Liebling and the concert pianist, composer, opera librettist, and music critic Leonard Liebling.

== Early life and career in Europe ==
Born into a Jewish family in the Duchy of Pless, Silesia, Germany, in what is present-day Pszczyna, Poland, Liebling was a child prodigy on the piano and began his career as a concert pianist in Europe at a young age. His three brothers, George, Emil, and Solly Liebling, were also successful pianists, and all four of them were trained on the piano by Franz Liszt. The four brothers also had success as composers in addition to being notable performers.

== Career in the United States ==
Max Liebling emigrated to the United States at the age of 16 and settled in New York City in the early 1860s. There he became a prominent accompanist and conductor as well as occasionally performing as a concert pianist. Some of the prominent singers whom he accompanied in concerts and recitals included Nellie Melba, Jean de Reszke, Emma Calvé, and Lilli Lehmann. He also toured the United States in concerts with violinists August Wilhelmj and Henryk Wieniawski. As a musical director he was active with several organizations, including The Lyra, a musical society he founded in New York City featuring many prominent professional Jewish musicians.

Liebling was also a highly respected teacher of piano in New York, and composed many works for the piano. His best-known composition is his Fantasia On Sousa Themes (1905) which adapted works by John Philip Sousa for violin and piano. This piece was dedicated to violinist Maud Powell who performed the work with Liebling at its premiere. It was recorded by violinist Rachel Barton Pine and pianist Matthew Hagle in 2007.

== Personal life ==
Liebling married Matilde Perkiewicz with whom he had four children: Otto, Leonard, James, and Estelle. Leonard Liebling was also a concert pianist and composer who trained under Leopold Godowsky and Theodor Kullak, and became the long-time editor-in-chief of the Musical Courier and music critic for the New York Journal-American. James Liebling was a successful cellist, and Estelle Liebling had a career as an operatic soprano in Europe and at the Metropolitan Opera before becoming one of the most prominent voice teachers and vocal coaches of the 20th century.

Liebling died at the home of his daughter Estelle in New York City at the age of 82 in 1927. His wife Matilde had died two decades earlier in 1907.
