= Anne Roselle =

American opera singer (1894–1989)

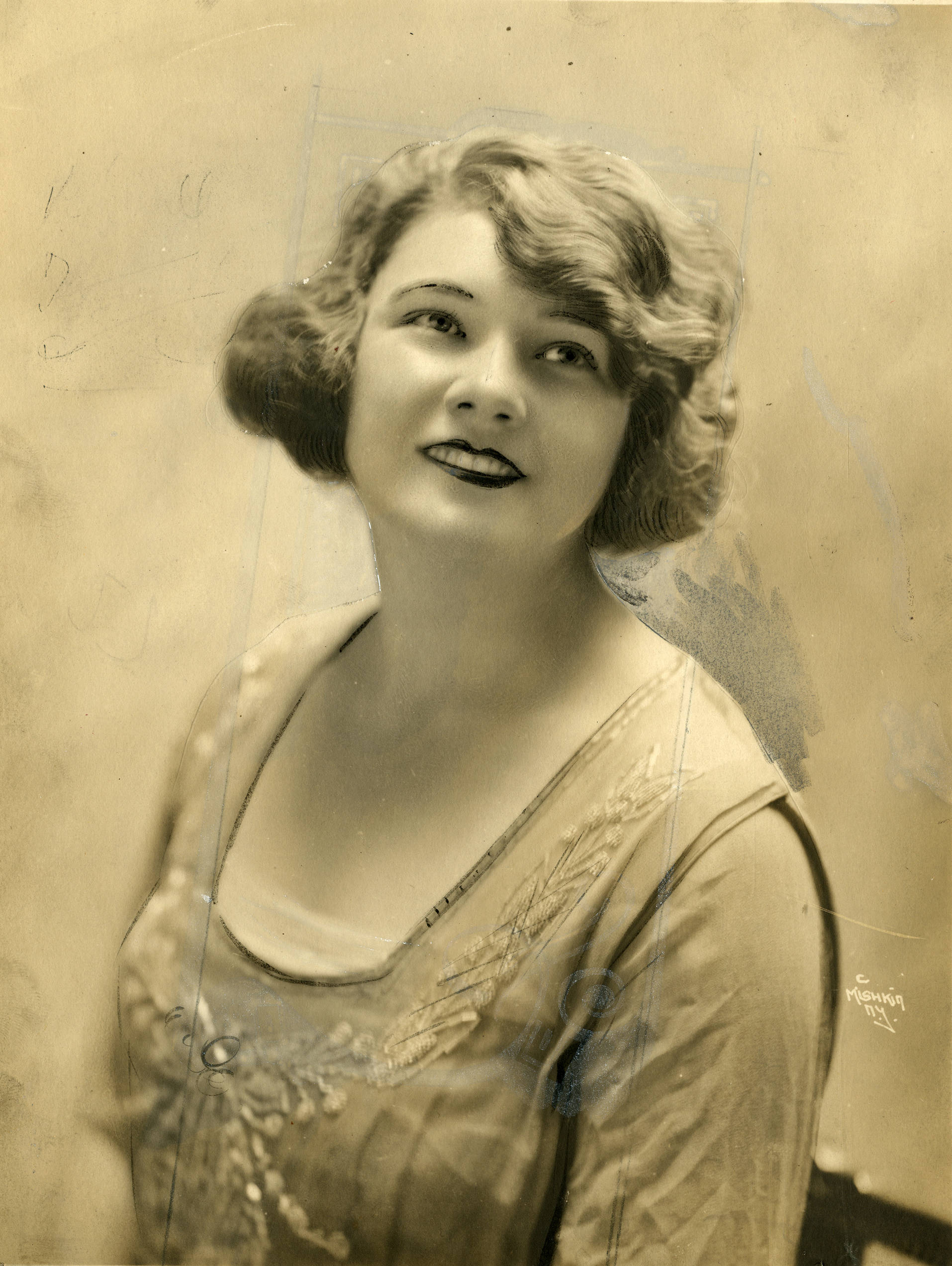
- Anne Roselle in 1921
- Born: Gyenge Anna; March 20, 1893; Târgu Secuiesc
- Died: July 31, 1989 (aged 96); Lakeland Florida
- Other name: Anna Roselle
- Occupation: Opera singer
- Years active: 1911–1946 (teaching until 1970)
- Spouse: Árpád (David) Rosner

Anne Roselle (born Gyenge Anna; March 20, 1893 – July 31, 1989) was a Hungarian/American operatic dramatic soprano.

== Early life ==
Gyenge Anna was born on March 20, 1893 in Târgu Secuiesc (Kézdivásárhely) in what was Hungary and is now Romania. (Note: Some sources such as Grove Music Online and the Großes Sängerlexikon state she was born in Budapest. Grove Music Online gives her date of birth as March 20, 1893, and the Grosses Sängerlexikon March 20, 1894. The Hungarian Biographical Lexicon contradicts both of these stating she was born on April 19, 1890 in Târgu Secuiesc. However, primary sources support the date of birth of March 20, 1893 found in Grove Music Online, but not in the city of Budapest as indicated in Grove, but in Târgu Secuiesc. The date in 1893 also places her age at 96 when she died on July 31, 1989, which is the age given in her published obituary in the Tampa Tribune.) She completed her studies in Csíkszereda (Miercurea Ciuc), Székelyudvarhely (Târgu Secuiesc) and Kolozsvár (Cluj-Napoca). She debuted in Budapest as Iluska in Pongrác Kacsó's "János Vitéz". In 1912, she married the banker Árpád Rosner in Temesvár (Timisoara), and they together moved to the US in this year, with her mother and stepfather. Roselle acted in Budapest and studied acting with Szidi Rákosi as a young woman. She studied singing with Estelle Liebling in New York City.

== Career ==
Roselle sang in New York, with the Metropolitan Opera in 1920, as Musetta in La bohème. She debuted on December 4, 1920, at the side of Frances Alda, Beniamino Gigli (his third performance in MET), Antonio Scotti and Adamo Didur. From 1922, she sang for two years with the San Carlo Opera Company, was a guest soloist with the Minneapolis Orchestra, toured in the central United States in the 1922–1923 season, and the private company of Antonio Scotti then moved back to Europe. She joined the Dresden Opera in 1925 to sing the title role in the first German performance of Puccini's Turandot on the side of Richard Tauber and conducted by Fritz Busch (July 4, 1926). She premiered the first Turandot in the US outside the MET in San Francisco (1927) and next year, the first performance in Verona with Georges Thill (1928). She sang in Budapest, Milan, Vienna, London, Paris and Berlin, and was part of a radio broadcast of Verdi's Un ballo in maschera, with Maria Olszewska. She was also known for singing the title role in Verdi's Aïda and Leonora in Il trovatore, among others. eeds URL Roselle returned to the United States late in 1929, and sang at Carnegie Hall. The New York Times reported that "her higher tones are usually produced with fine resonance and color and absolute fidelity to the pitch". In 1931, she starred in the first United States performance of Wozzeck, with the Philadelphia Orchestra, under the direction of Leopold Stokowski, and in the MET, as her last appearance there. Also in 1931, she performed the first German-language version in America of Richard Strauss's Elektra in the US, conducted by Fritz Reiner, casting also Margarete Matzenauer, Charlotte Boerner and Nelson Eddy.

She regularly sang in Budapest between 1926–1938, where she was a company member in 1936/1937. Her roles covered a rarely seen repertoire from Mozart's Constanze to Turandot, and also Nedda and Santuzza (after each other), Butterfly, Margit (Faust), Tosca, Leonore (Il Trovatore), Elisabeth (Tannhäuser), Saffi (Der Zigeunerbaron), Mimi, Desdemona and Donna Anna. In 1936, she went to a tour to her native land Transilvania with a selection of Kodály's Hungarian Folk Songs, and toured to Hungarian cities like Szeged, Miskolc, Nagykanizsa, Debrecen. In 1935, she got a role in the film 'Halló, Budapest'.

In 1934, she was back at Carnegie Hall, in Orfeo ed Euridice. and went to London to sing Turandot with her partners Eide Norena, Armand Tokatyan and Ezio Pinza.

Her possible last appearance on a staged full opera was in 1941, in Mozart's Don Giovanni, with her partners Ezio Pinza, Tito Schipa, Margit Bokor, Lőrincz Alváry, conducted by László Halász. There is a 35 minute long recording of this performance. Until 1946, she sang arias at various concerts, too.

In 1946, she sang in a diverse 'pop' concert at Carnegie Hall, sharing the program with Hungarian pianist Ernö Balogh, Huddie Ledbetter, Mary Lou Williams, Tom Scott, Susan Reed, and others. She gave a recital in 1948 at New York's Town Hall performance space. She recorded opera arias and songs by Schubert and Hungarian composers to 26 LP discs.

After she retired from the stage, Roselle taught voice in Philadelphia. She was artist-in-residence at Florida Southern College in her later years, until she retired from teaching in 1967.

Roselle made several recordings in Berlin in the 1920s. In 1934, she gave an interview decrying the effect of recorded music on live music. In 1971, she gave another interview, grateful to revisit the past through recordings.

Anne Roselle made her first recordings under her birthname Anna Gyenge for Victor (Camden 1916–17), then followed records for Polydor (Berlin 1926–28 and Paris 1932). In 1948 she recorded in New York for Continental and Remington.

== Personal life ==
In 1912, Roselle married a Hungarian banker, Árpád (later David in America) Rosner; they had a son, George. She was widowed when Rosner died in 1956; she lived in a nursing home in Lakeland, Florida in her later years. She died in Lakeland on July 31, 1989 at the age of 96.

== Literature ==
- Jim McPherson: Anne Roselle in "The Record Collector Vol. 47 No. 4, December 2002
