= Rosario García Orellana =

Cuban coloratura soprano (1905–1997)

Rosario García Orellana (October 2, 1905, in Madrid – November 3, 1997, in New York City) was a Cuban coloratura soprano. She was trained by voice teacher Estelle Liebling, the teacher of Beverly Sills. Cuban composer and pianist Ernesto Lecuona composed Escucha al Ruiseñor (Listen to the Nightingale) for her which she recorded, among other Cuban music, in New York City for RCA Victor. She was thereafter known as Cuba's nightingale.

== Career ==
Her operatic debut came on November 25, 1933, courtesy of the Company of Opera of Chicago, at the New York Hippodrome, where she took the role of Gilda in Rigoletto - and received five curtain calls.

She also had many concerts and shows in the Carnegie Hall and the Radio City Music Hall during the 1930s and she was part of Lecuona's company. In 1945, the famous Spanish Ballet La Argentinita hired Rosario to perform at the Metropolitan Opera House in New York.
