= Alice Verlet =

French opera singer

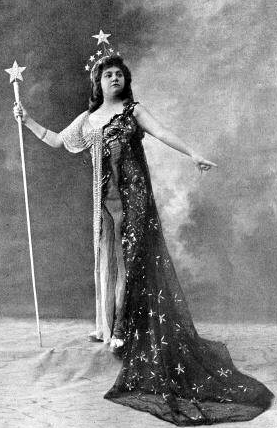
Alice Verlet in Mozart's Magic Flute in 1912

Alice Verlet (1873–1934) was a Belgian-born operatic lyric coloratura soprano active primarily in France. She sang principal roles at the operas in Lyon, Nice, and Monte Carlo; at His Majesty's Theater in London; at La Monnaie in Brussels; and at the Paris Opéra and Opéra-Comique. In the United States, although not entirely absent from the operatic stage, she was known primarily as a concert singer and was a featured singer on Edison records.

== Life ==
Alice Verlet was born in 1873 as Alice Verheyden in the Flemish-speaking region of Belgium, where her father was an official. She commenced musical study at age 8 with lessons in piano and harmony; vocal training did not follow until age 16, when she studied under Mme. Moriani, then a respected voice teacher in Brussels. Within four years, in 1893, Verlet made her professional debut at Leuven, immediately after which she sang for the Belgian Queen and members of the nobility in Brussels.

=== European career ===
Verlet made her debut at the Opéra-Comique in 1894. as Philine in Thomas's Mignon On July 16, 1895, she appeared in England, participating in a concert at the Masonic Hall in Birmingham presented by Mme. Moriani to showcase her pupils. Two other participants, now long forgotten, had already made debuts in London, but with some prescience Mme. Moriani emphasized to the press that the Opéra-Comique had recently engaged Verlet as prima donna.

From that point forward, Verlet enjoyed a successful career, particularly in Francophone Europe. Her debut at the Monnaie in Brussels took place on September 7, 1901, in Verdi's Rigoletto; she remained a member of that company for the balance of the season and later would make periodic appearances there. Her debut at the Paris Opéra, as Blondine in a French-language production of Mozart's Die Entführung aus dem Serail, came in 1903. She sang her first Rigoletto in that house on April 11, 1904; Adelina Patti, who was in attendance, conspicuously displayed enthusiasm for Verlet's singing and offered congratulations to Verlet's teacher, Mme. Moriani.

In 1905 and 1906, Verlet played the Naiad in the first modern revival of Gluck's Armide in Paris. Other cast members included Lucienne Bréval, Agustarello Affre, Dinh Gilly, and Geneviève Vix. Two years later, she was at the Théâtre de la Gaîté-Lyrique for a run of Lakmé with David Devriès and Félix Vieuille.

Verlet assembled a company and undertook a tour of England in 1910. Other members included contralto Edna Thornton and pianist Mark Hambourg; the accompanist was Cyril Towsey of Wellington, New Zealand, who had carved out a career performing in such ad hoc groups. In July, Verlet returned to Birmingham, the scene of her English artistic "coming out" 15 years before, as a participant in daily concerts for the city's centenary fetes, although perhaps upstaged by a massive air show, not unmarred by fatal crashes of the then-novel machines. She was again in distinguished artistic company, organized and directed by Dan Godfrey: other participants included singers Nellie Melba, Agnes Nicholls, and Harry Plunket Greene; pianists Wilhelm Backhaus, Myra Hess, and Benno Moiseiwitsch; and violinist Mischa Elman. Verlet made her London debut one month earlier as a participant in the Thomas Beecham Opera Comique Season at His Majesty's Theater. As in her Paris Opera debut, the opera was Die Entführung aus dem Serail, but now Verlet played Constanze opposite Maggie Teyte as Blonde and Robert Radford as Osmin, all under Beecham's baton.

=== US appearances ===
Shortly after completing her first season at the Opéra-Comique, Verlet sang at the residence of the American ambassador to Belgium. The result was an invitation to make her first visit to the United States, which led to her US debut in August 1896. Among her early US engagements was at the sold-out May 10, 1897, inaugural concert of the Fanny Mendelssohn Society, a women's choral group founded and directed by J. Alfred Pennington, in Scranton, Pennsylvania. Interspersed with selections for the chorus and for harpist Maude Morgan, Verlet sang two songs, "The Kiss" by Helmund and "Les Filles de Cadiz" by Léo Delibes; two operatic excerpts, the Spinning Song from Wagner's Der fliegende Holländer and the Shadow Song from Meyerbeer's Dinorah; and, together with all the other artists assembled, including accompanist Charlotte Blackman, Horatio Parker's part song for women's chorus, composed only five years earlier, "The Fisher". Verlet's interpolation of a high concluding note in the Meyerbeer earned her a standing ovation and encore.

At the time of the Scranton performance, Verlet counted 25 operas in her repertoire; could sing fluently in French, Italian, and German; and planned to make her New York debut at Carnegie Hall on the following November 1 in a Damrosch concert. Some twenty-five years later, ending a concert tour on March 17, 1922, Verlet would revisit that hall to present a program including European operatic arias "from Mozart to Massenet" and songs by US composers including Henry Hadley and Thurlow Lieurance. Accompanying her were pianist J. Warren Erb and a young Spanish-born classical violinist from Cuba named Xavier Cugat, who soon would shift genres and go on to fame as the "rhumba king", the first leader of a successful Latin dance band in the United States.

Although primarily a concert singer in the United States, Verlet did perform some opera. In 1915 the Chicago Opera engaged her as Philene in several performances of Thomas's Mignon. Also in the cast were Conchita Supervia, Charles Dalmorès, and Marcel Journet. She also performed with the Boston Opera.

=== Last years ===
The sort of elaborate ornamentation in which she excelled having fallen out of fashion, Verlet retired from performing in 1920. Thereafter, she taught voice until her death in Paris in 1934.

== Recordings ==
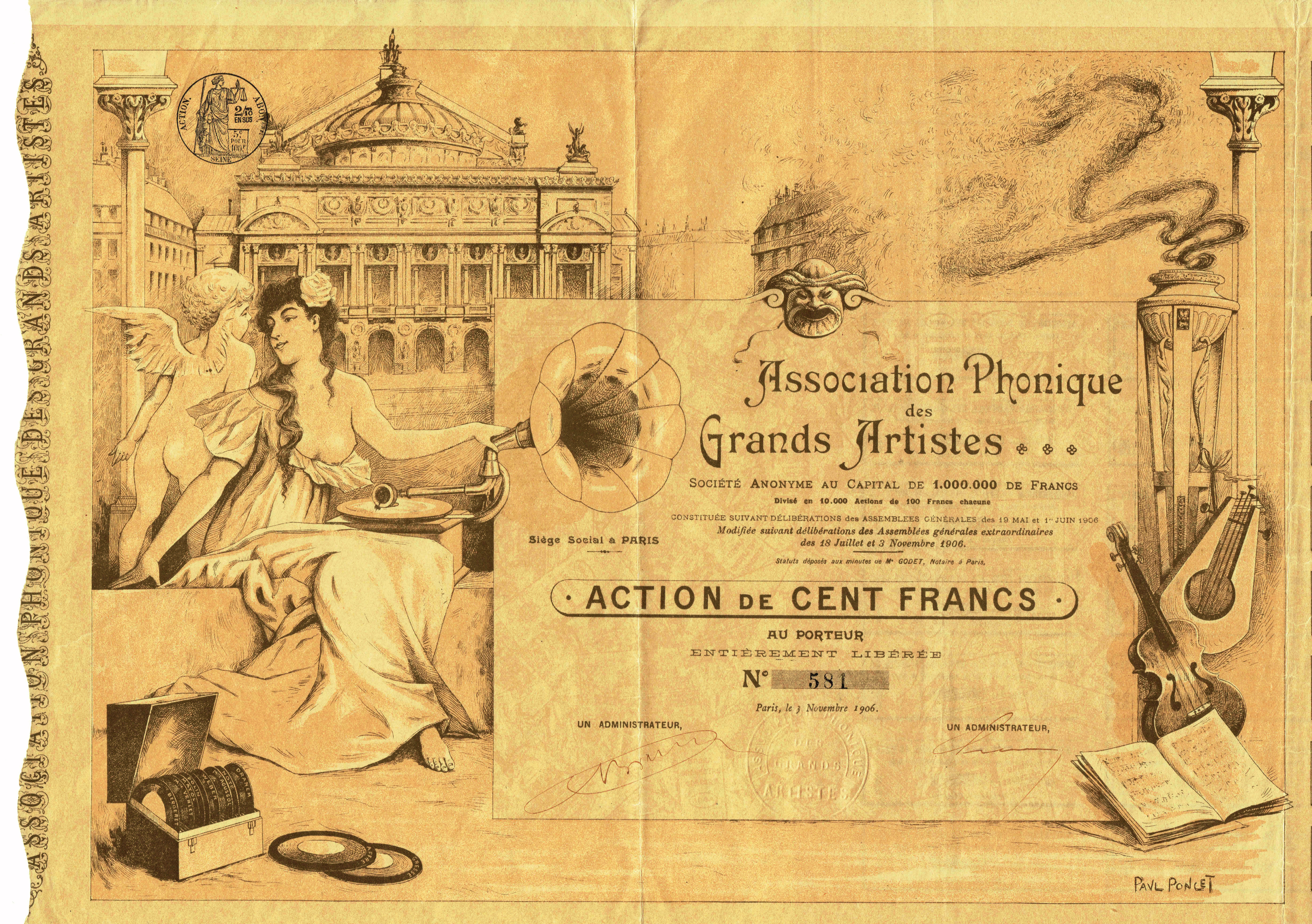
Share of the Association Phonique des Grands Artistes, issued 3. November 1906

Verlet made both vertical and lateral cut recordings in Europe, where she also participated in a short-lived artists' revolt against the recording industry. In May 1906, she and several other well-regarded operatic and music hall singers created Association Phonique des Grands Artistes (APGA), intended as a recording venture operated by and for singers. Its declared reason for being was to counter existing industry practice that companies paid performers only a flat fee for their services, while most others involved in the enterprise reaped royalties from each individual record sold. APGA foundered in 1910 amidst allegations of fraud. Some of Verlet's recordings from this period appeared as vertical cut Pathé Records issues under the anonymous attribution "Madame 'X' de L'Opera." Verlet also recorded laterally for the Gramophone Company.

In the United States, the Victor Talking Machine Company issued some of her European lateral records, albeit not in its celebrity red seal series, but Verlet was most closely associated with the Edison company and its diamond discs. Possibly explaining the extent and duration of that association is the following description of her voice, published around the time of her US debut: "Mlle. Verlet's voice is a fine soprano, very clear and even, and admirably trained; not a trace of the objectionable tremolo is perceptible, but all the tones are firm and true." Thomas Edison famously objected to what he considered "tremolo", and company promotional statements emphasized Verlet's freedom from that objectionable quality.

In addition to recording repertory for Edison including traditional and semi-classical songs, arias from French and Italian opera, standard coloratura display pieces, oddities long vanished from the active stage, and the national anthem of her native Belgium, Verlet was a key player in the company's so-called "tone tests". On August 10, 1915, she took the stage at the first Edison Dealers' Convention in West Orange, New Jersey, and sang "Caro nome" from Verdi's Rigoletto in duet and alternating with her diamond disc recording of the same aria. The audience of dealers, by no means assembled as lovers of opera and already doubtless weary from attending more than a day's worth of company promotional sessions, gave her a standing ovation. A few such trials had already been undertaken by other artists on a small scale, but Verlet's performance marked the company's announcement that it would make them a fixture of its national marketing. So it proved, and Verlet continued to be involved. For instance, together with violinist Arthur L. Walsh, who had also performed at the convention, and members of the New York Philharmonic, on November 30, 1915, she repeated her performance of "Caro nome" before a capacity audience at Orchestra Hall in Chicago. She also sang with her records of Johann Strauss's Voices of Spring; the "Jewel Song" from Gounod's Faust; "Parigi o cara" and "Addio del passato" from Verdi's La traviata; and "Belle nuit" from Offenbach's The Tales of Hoffmann, the last a duet recording with Margaret Matzenauer, in whose absence Walsh played a violin obbligato.
