= Love's Old Sweet Song =

Victorian parlour song published in 1884 by composer James Lynam Molloy and lyricist G

- Sheet music

Song
- Language: English
- Published: 1884 by M. D. Swisher
- Songwriter: G. Clifton Bingham
- Composer: James Lynam Molloy

"Love's Old Sweet Song" is a Victorian parlour song published in 1884 by composer James Lynam Molloy and lyricist Graham Clifton Bingham. The first line of the chorus is "Just a song at twilight", and its title is sometimes misidentified as such. Bingham wrote the lyric of ‘Love’s Old Sweet Song’, after which various composers competed to set it to music. The successful candidate was James Molloy.

It was first sung by Antoinette Sterling at a concert at St James's Hall in London in 1884. James Molloy worked at her house on the melody and accompaniment. The song has been recorded by many artists, including John McCormack and Clara Butt. The song is alluded to in James Joyce's Ulysses as being sung by Molly Bloom.

Arthur Sullivan was accused of using the song’s first two bars for ‘When a merry maiden marries’ in The Gondoliers; he denied it.

== Lyrics ==
The song contains two verses and a refrain. The best known part of the song is the refrain, which goes.

Refrain.

Just a song at twilight, when the lights are low,

And the flick'ring shadows softly come and go;

Tho' the heart be weary, sad the day and long,

Still to us at twilight

Comes love's old song,

Comes love's old sweet song.

== Notable recordings ==
- 1892 Thomas Bott
- 1905 Corrine Morgan
- 1920 Chester Gaylord
- 1932 The Rondoliers and Piano Pals
- 1940 The Mills Brothers - recorded March 22, 1940 for Decca Records (catalog No. 3455B).
- 1950 Jo Stafford and Gordon MacRae
- 1954 Bing Crosby recorded the song in 1956 for use on his radio show and it was subsequently included in a CD On the Sentimental Side issued by Collectors' Choice Music (catalog CCM2106) in 2010. Crosby also included the song in a medley on his album 101 Gang Songs (1961)
- 1960 Ruby Murray - included in her album Ruby.
- 2011 Celtic Thunder

== Film appearances ==
- 1923 Love's Old Sweet Song (1923 film) a two-reel short film made in the DeForest Phonofilm sound-on-film process.
- 1926 The Sea Beast - as the theme in the orchestral score in John Barrymore's film.
- 1929 Finding His Voice - sung by an animated film reel
- 1931 Hell Divers - played on piano by Wallace Beery
- 1934 Judge Priest - sung offscreen by an unidentified voice. Played also in the score.
- 1935 The Arizonian - played in a show and danced to by Margot Grahame with James Bush and Richard Dix.
- 1936 Sabotage - sung a cappella by a man lighting candles
- 1938 Storm Over Bengal
- 1939 Broadway Serenade - played on piano by Lew Ayres and sung by Jeanette MacDonald and audience in the Naughty Nineties nightclub.
- 1940 Rebecca - hummed by Joan Fontaine
- 1941 The Farmer's Wife - sung by Patricia Roc
- 1942 Unseen Enemy - sung by Irene Hervey
- 1943 It Comes Up Love
- 1946 Demobbed - sung by Anne Ziegler and Webster Booth in the garden medley
- 1947 Life with Father - played on piano and sung by William Powell
- 1950 Cheaper by the Dozen - played by the children on various instruments
- 1950 Father Is a Bachelor
- 1952 Wait till the Sun Shines, Nellie
- 1952 Belles on Their Toes - sung by Myrna Loy, Jeanne Crain, Debra Paget, Barbara Bates, Robert Arthur and Hoagy Carmichael right after the beach barbecue
- 1965 The Intelligence Men
- 1975 The Wind and the Lion
- 1990 Awakenings
- 1992 Enchanted April
- 2023 Only Murders in the Building
