= Alice D'Hermanoy =

Belgian lyric soprano

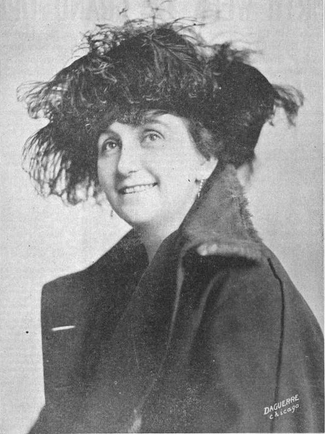
- Alice D'Hermanoy, from a 1921 publication.
- Born: Alice Saintenoy; January 15, 1885; Brussels, Belgium
- Died: After 1932
- Occupation: opera singer

Alice D'Hermanoy (born January 15, 1885 — died after 1932), born Alice Saintenoy, was a Belgian lyric soprano who sang with the Chicago Civic Opera in the 1920s.

== Early life ==
Alice Saintenoy was born in Brussels. Her family was of Walloon ethnicity. She trained to sing at the Royal Conservatory in Brussels.

== Career ==
D'Hermanoy sang with the Brussels opera for four seasons, and for three seasons in Cairo. During World War I, unable to return from France to Belgium, she went instead to Switzerland, where she sang with the Geneva Opera and volunteered as a Red Cross nurse, giving rise to her billing as "the Florence Nightingale of Song". She sang at the Belgian celebration of the end of war, and for a season at the Royal Opera House in Covent Garden in 1920.

She first sang with the Chicago Civic Opera in 1921, in Carmen. In 1922 she was in the cast of Massenet's Manon in New York, with Tito Schipa and Edith Mason. She toured with the Chicago Civic Opera's productions of Namiko-San (1925) in Chicago, with Tamaki Miura, La Traviata (1926, 1927, 1928, 1929, 1930) with Claudia Muzio and Tito Schipa, Rigoletto (1926, 1927, 1928) with Charles Hackett and Devora Nadworney, Lucia di Lammermoor (1926, 1930, 1931), and Il trovatore (1927, 1928, 1930). In 1931 she toured with the Chicago Civil Opera to California and the Pacific Northwest.

Alice D'Hermanoy also kept poultry at her farm in Belgium. She attended poultry shows in the United States to buy birds, and reportedly sang arias for her chickens to improve them.

== Personal life ==
Alice D'Hermanoy married opera conductor Charles Henri Lauwers in 1921. The couple lived in Los Angeles in 1931.
