= Emil Liebling =

German-American pianist and composer

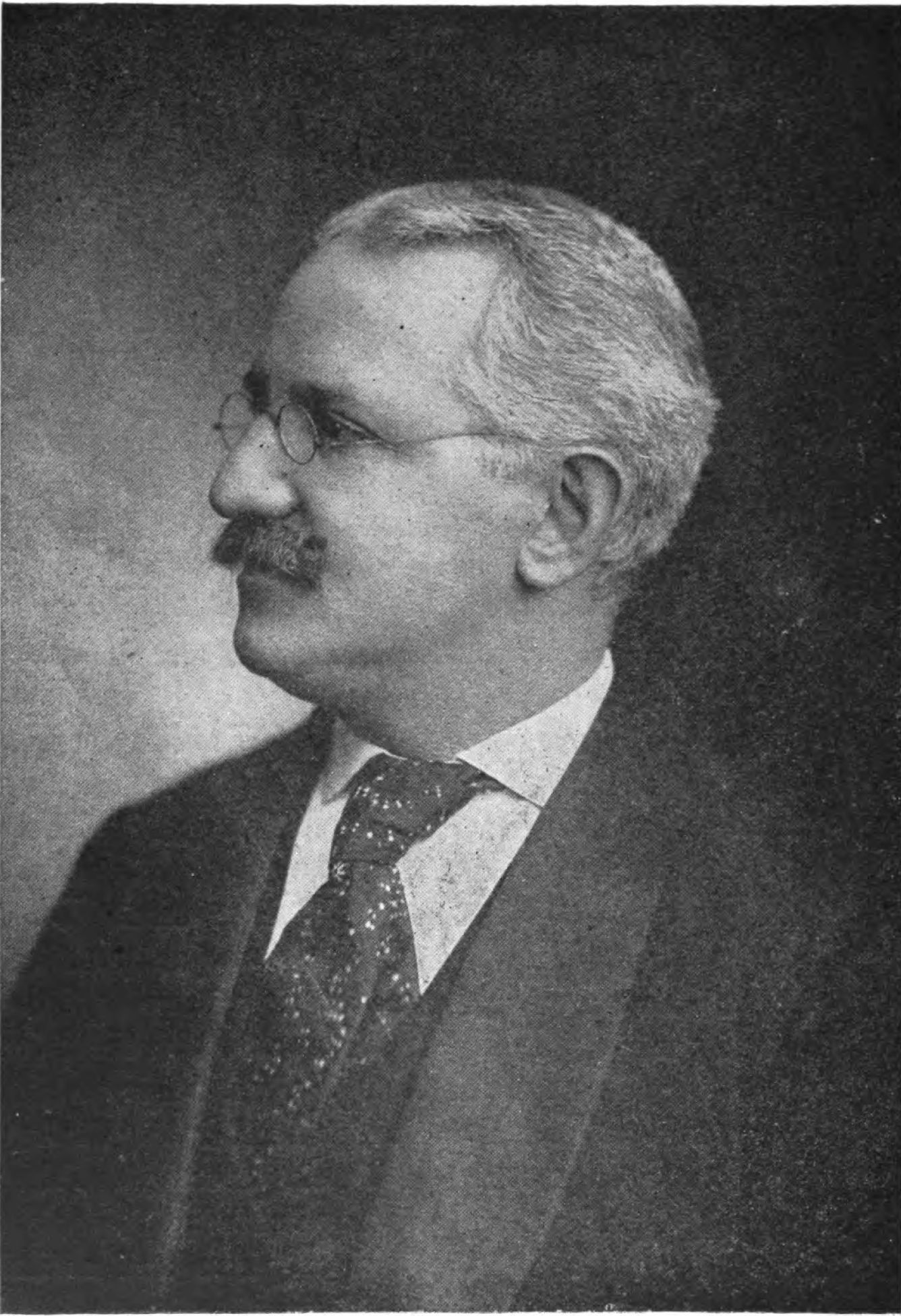
- Liebling, c. 1900
- Born: April 12, 1851; Duchy of Pless, Silesia
- Died: January 19, 1914 (aged 62)
- Occupations: Concert pianist; Composer; Music educator

Emil Liebling (April 12, 1851 – January 20, 1914) was a German-American pianist and composer.

== Biography ==
Liebling was born into a Jewish family in the Duchy of Pless, Kingdom of Prussia. Liebling was from a famous family of musicians. His three brothers, George, Max, and Solly Liebling, were also successful pianists, and all four of them were trained on the piano by Franz Liszt in Weimar. The four brothers also had success as composers in addition to being notable performers. His older brother Max moved to New York City as a teenager having already had a career as a concert pianist in Europe. Max was the father of several successful musicians, including the soprano and famous voice teacher Estelle Liebling; the cellist James Liebling; and the music critic, pianist, composer, and opera librettist Leonard Liebling.

In addition to his studies with Liszt, Emil studied music and the piano with Ehrlich, Heinrich Dorn, and Theodor Kullak in Berlin, and with Dachs in Vienna. In 1867 he came to the United States, where he settled as a music teacher at a seminary in Kentucky where he remained on the faculty until 1871. After 1872 he was identified with the musical life of Chicago, making several appearances as a soloist with the Chicago Symphony Orchestra in addition to working as an accompanist, recitalist, and chamber musician. His compositions include piano pieces and songs in the popular style of his day.

Liebling served as visiting director of piano at the Frances Shimer Academy in Mount Carroll, Illinois, from 1904 to 1913. The position involved visiting the school several times per year to perform a concert and inspect student progress. He also held a similar position at Milwaukee-Downer College in Wisconsin.
