= Sally Liebling =

German pianist, composer and teacher

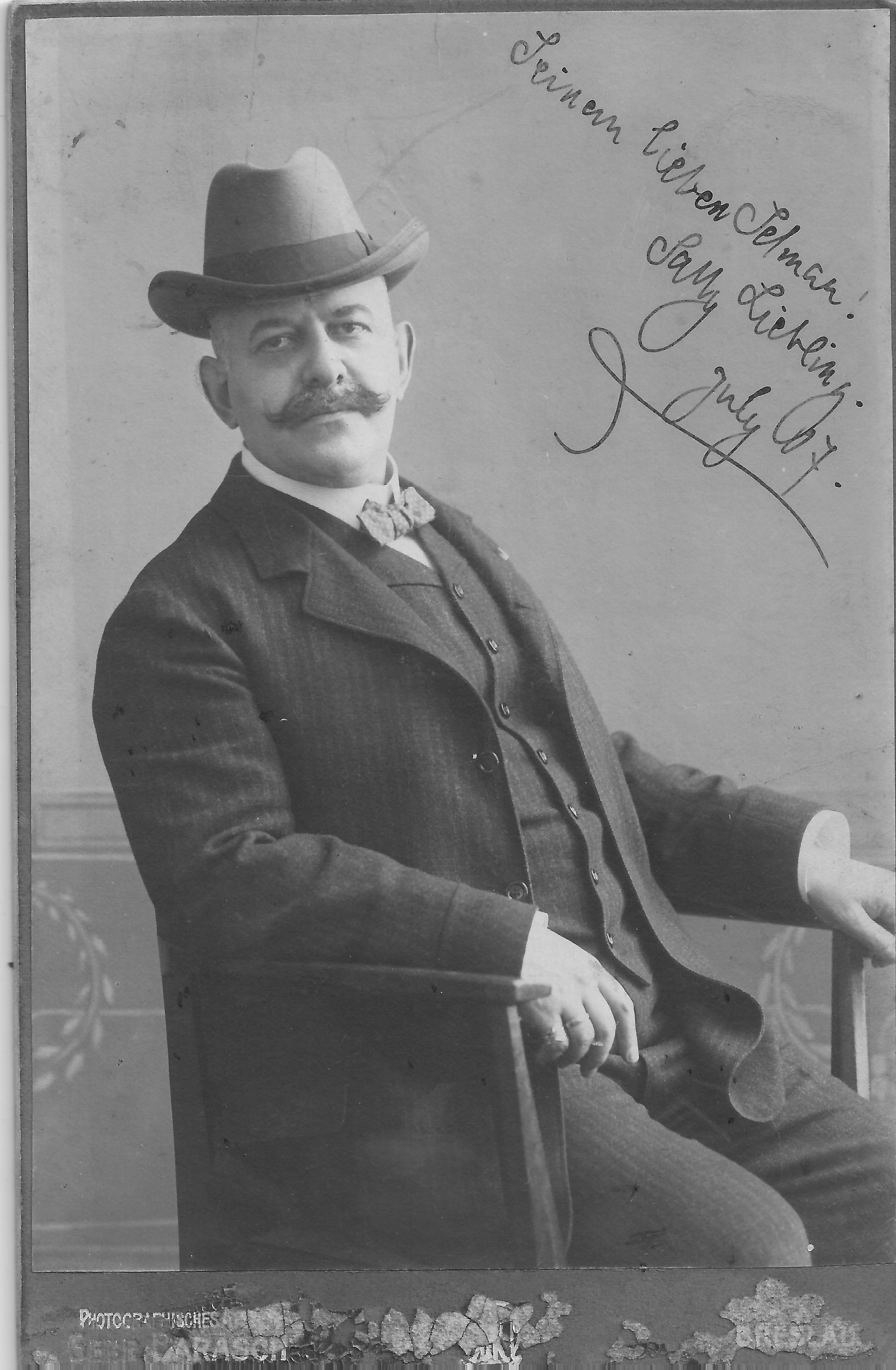
- Signed portrait of Sally Liebling to his student Selmar Janson
- Born: 8 April 1859; Posen, Kingdom of Prussia
- Died: 15 September 1909 (aged 50); Berlin, German Empire
- Occupations: Concert pianist; Composer; Music educator
- Organization: New Conservatory of Music

Sally Liebling, sometimes given as Solly Liebling, (8 April 1859 – 15 September 1909) was a German pianist, composer, and teacher.

== Biography ==
Born in the province of Posen, Liebling was from a prominent Jewish family of musicians. His three brothers, Georg, Emil, and Max Liebling, were also successful pianists, and all four of them were trained on the piano by Franz Liszt. Sally studied with Liszt at Weimar in 1884. The four brothers also had success as composers in addition to being notable performers. His older brother Max moved to New York City as a teenager having already had a career as a concert pianist in Europe. Max was the father of several successful musicians, including the soprano and famous voice teacher Estelle Liebling; the cellist James Liebling; and the music critic, pianist, composer, and opera librettist Leonard Liebling.

In addition to his time as a pupil of Liszt, Sally Liebling pursued further studies in music and the piano under Theodor Kullak, Franz Bendel and Carl Friedrich Weitzmann in Berlin. He made a number of concert tours in Germany, and with Theodore Thomas's orchestra in the United States (1875). He subsequently gave many recitals with well-known artists.

In 1888 he founded the New Conservatory of Music at Berlin where he taught until his death. His students included Selmar Janson.
