= James Lynam Molloy =

Irish composer and writer (1837–1909)

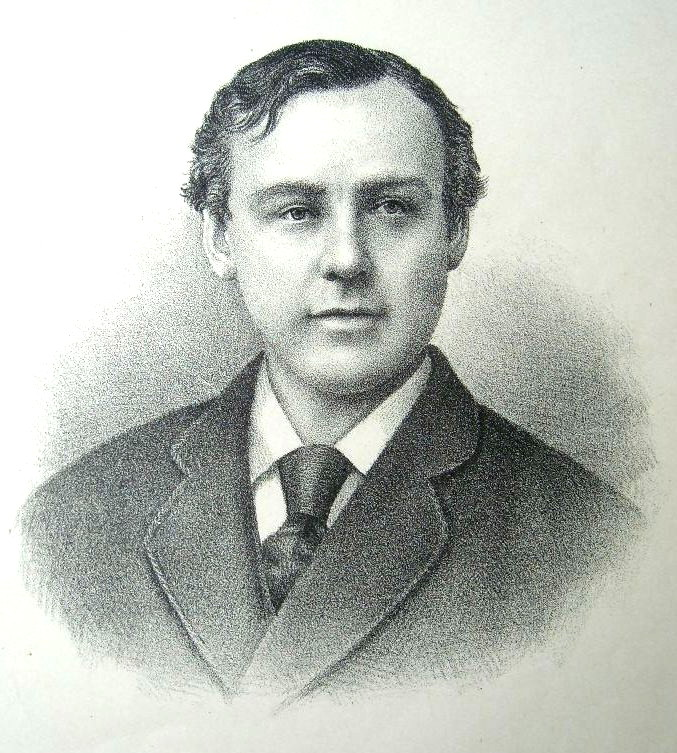
- Born: James Lynam Molloy; 19 August 1837 near Rahan, County Offaly, Ireland
- Died: 4 February 1909 (aged 71); Henley-on-Thames, Oxfordshire, England
- Era: 19th century Irish songs, folk songs
- Known for: The Kerry Dance, Love's Old Sweet Song
- Spouse: Florence Emma Baskerville
- Children: 3

James Lynam Molloy (19 August 1837 – 4 February 1909) was an Irish composer, poet, and author. His songs were praised by his contemporaries; one said that he "will be remembered, or certainly his songs will, long after the 'superior' and so-called 'art-songs' of to-day are forgotten."

== Early life ==
James L. Molloy was born near Rahan in County Offaly and attended St Edmund's College (Ware) as a student between 1851 and 1855 along with his brother Bernard, who later became a Home Rule Member of parliament. After leaving the College, he went to the Catholic University in Dublin, graduating in 1858. Further studies brought him to London, Paris, and Bonn, before he settled in London from about 1863 with a lawyer's degree.

== Private secretary and war correspondent ==
However, he never practiced law. Instead, he worked as a private secretary to the then attorney general. He was a war correspondent for the London Standard on the Franco-Prussian War and traveled widely, particularly in France. From 1880 he lived in Henley-on-Thames near London.

== Songs and songwriting ==
Molloy's first songs date from 1865 when he was 28 years old, but his career really took off with the regular London ballad concerts from the late 1860s and particularly during the 1870s. His most often quoted successes in his own lifetime were songs like Clochette (1867), Thady O'Flynn (1869), Eily's Reason (1871), Dresden China (1875), Darby and Joan (1878), Love's Old Sweet Song (1884), and The French Partridge (1904). "Love's Old Sweet Song" proved to be a best-seller for many years, particularly popular with sailors, and immortalized in Joyce's Ulysses. Several of his songs were written in collaboration with W. S. Gilbert, including Thady O'Flynn (used in the operetta No Cards), Corisande (1870) and Eily's Reason.

From early on, his music included songs relating to Ireland, and although many of them made no use of Irish traditional melodic or rhythmic elements, they gained such a popularity in the early 20th century that some gained a folksong status. These include his still-famous The Kerry Dance (1879) and Bantry Bay (1889) to which he wrote both words and music.

Many contemporary writers considered Molloy's songs to be above average. An 1867 concert review remarks: "Mr Molloy's songs are (to use a common expression) 'for the drawing-room,' but there is more in them than in the generality of effusions written now-a-days for young lady amateurs, who cannot perceive the charm of a higher order of composition." The 1874 song Don't be Sorrowful, Darling has been described as "One of Molloy's simple little ballads, with a great deal in it. Music and Words are equally earnest and impressive."

Apparently Molloy did frequently manage to respond to demands for the popular with a product that could also satisfy a certain artistic standard. In an obituary on Molloy, the well-known lyric poet Fred Weatherley claimed that Molloy "will be remembered, or certainly his songs will, long after the 'superior' and so-called 'art-songs' of to-day are forgotten."

In 1874, Molloy also wrote a book called Our Autumn Holiday on French Rivers.

== Death ==
He died in Henley-on-Thames in 1909.

== In literature ==
In his memoir Angela's Ashes, Frank McCourt recalls his mother singing The Kerry Dance when she fetches him from his friend Paddy Clohessy’s home. The father, Dennis, had been her dancing partner before she left for America. She and then young Frank sing the chorus and a verse of the song. In the audio book, McCourt sings the song.
