= Beatrice Belkin =

American soprano

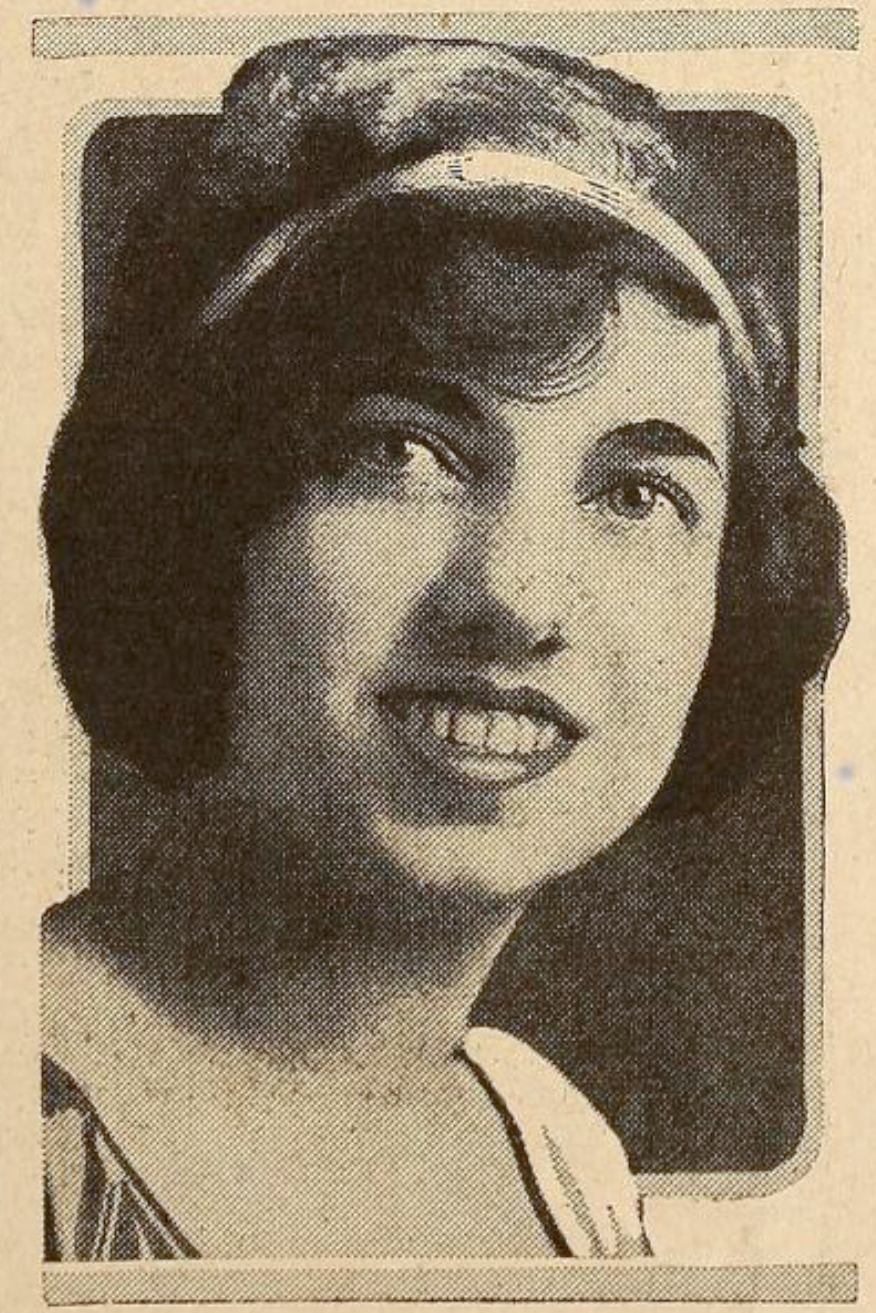
- Belkin in 1926
- Born: Beatrice Abrams; November 4, 1902; New York City, New York, U.S.
- Died: March 15, 1998 (aged 95); Westchester County, New York, U.S.
- Education: University of Kansas (BM)
- Occupations: singer, voice teacher
- Spouse: Joseph Littau
- Children: 2

Beatrice Belkin, born Beatrice Abrams and also known by her married name Beatrice Littau, (4 November 1902 – 15 March 1998) was an American soprano who had an active career during the 1920s and 1930s. She came to prominence as one of the regular performers in Samuel Roxy Rothafel's "Roxy and His Gang", performing both on American radio and at numerous theaters with this group, including Radio City Music Hall, the Roxy Theatre, the RKO Roxy Theatre, New York City Center, and the Paramount Theatre. She simultaneously worked as an opera and concert soprano, performing with the Metropolitan Opera, the Philadelphia La Scala Opera Company, the St. Louis Municipal Opera Theatre, Minneapolis Symphony Orchestra, and the Boston Pops among other organizations. She was married to the conductor Joseph Littau, and after retiring from the stage raised their children in Croton-on-Hudson, New York. She also worked as a voice teacher in the Hudson Valley.

== Early life and career ==
The daughter of Mr. And Mrs. George B Abrams, Beatrice Belkin was born Beatrice Abrams in New York City on 4 November 1902. Her father had emigrated from Russia to the United States not long before she was born. He had worked as a singer in theaters in Turkey and Germany prior to immigrating to the United States. Beatrice's mother was from Lithuania, and her parents married in Palestine prior to coming to the United States. The Abrams family moved to Lawrence, Kansas in 1916. There her father worked for the Hub Clothing Co.

Beatrice was educated at Lawrence High School. She graduated from the University of Kansas with a Bachelor of Music degree in 1924. Her voice teacher at the university was Waller Whitlock. By December 1924 she was going by the name of Beatrice Belkin and was living in New York City where she was a pupil of voice teacher Estelle Liebling. She held paid singing posts at the Congregation Emanu-El of New York and Temple Emanu-El in Bayonne, New Jersey. In 1925 she was a soloist at the Mosque Theatre in Newark, and she was the resident soprano soloist at the Rialto Theatre; an upscale movie palace that had live entertainment presented in conjunction with silent films in a single evening of entertainment.

== Roxy soprano ==
Belkin became a prominent movie palace and radio singer in New York City working regularly for the impresario Samuel Roxy Rothafel. She was a regular performer on his radio variety program Roxy and His Gang, and sang on the program's very first broadcast on NBC's Blue Network in 1927. She performed on a regular basis at the Roxy Theatre in the late 1920s and early 1930s. Rothafel had outfitted the Roxy Theatre with sixteen microphones, fourteen of which could be operated simultaneously, through which live performances at the theater by "Roxy and His Gang" could be simultaneously broadcast on the radio over both the WJZ and Blue Network.

Belkin also sang for Roxy at Radio City Music Hall. In 1931 she performed at New York City Center with Roxy and his Gang to raise funds for crippled children. In 1933 she was working for Roxy at the RKO Roxy Theatre. She was still singing for Roxy as late as 1934 at the Paramount Theatre, and for a series of broadcasts made in Chicago in which Roxy and his Gang performed on Chicago Theater of the Air. She married the conductor of Roxy's orchestra, Joseph Littau, on October 4, 1931, in Morrisville, Pennsylvania. They remained married until Littau's death in 1977.

== Opera and concert soprano ==
While working for Roxy, Belkin also worked periodically on the opera and concert stages. In 1926 she was a member of the Philadelphia La Scala Opera Company. In 1927 she performed the role of Olympia in The Tales of Hoffmann at the St. Louis Municipal Opera Theatre. She returned to University of Kansas during the schools 1928–1929 academic year to perform at a music festival held at the school's campus with the Minneapolis Symphony Orchestra. In 1929 she performed the roles of Blonde in Die Entführung aus dem Serail, Gilda in Rigoletto, and Rosina in The Barber of Seville; performing with opera companies in Boston and Philadelphia.

In 1929 Belkin performed the world premiere of the waltz "Spring Joy" by William Rogers Chapman (1855–1935) at a concert sponsored by the Rubenstein Club at the Waldorf Astoria New York. In May 1930 she made her European concert debut in Berlin at Bechstein-Saal; performing Zerbinetta's aria from Ariadne auf Naxos. On October 6, 1930, she gave a recital at The Town Hall accompanied by pianist Leo Russotto and flautists Hendrik de Vries and George Possell. On October 30, 1930, she made her debut at the Metropolitan Opera as the Dew Man in Engelbert Humperdinck's Hansel and Gretel. In 1931 she sang Rosina in Philadelphia under conductor Fulgenzio Guerrieri. In 1932 she was a soloist with the Omaha Orchestra with her husband conducting.

In 1936 Belkin performed the role of Tallula in a concert version of Charles Sanford Skilton's opera Kalopin given as a part of a concert series of American music organized by the National Association of American Composers and Conductors. That same year she starred as Lauretta in a production of Giovanni Battista Pergolesi's rarely performed opera Il maestro di musica at Jordan Hall with the Boston Pops; a work mounted to honor the bicentennial of Pergolesi's death.

== Later life ==
After retiring from the stage, Beatrice Littau worked as voice teacher in the Hudson Valley. She lived with her husband and raised their children, Julian and Olive, in Croton-on-Hudson, New York. She died in Westchester County, New York on 15 March 1998.
