= Leonard Liebling =

American music critic, writer, librettist, editor, pianist, and composer

- Born: February 7, 1874; New York City, U.S.
- Died: October 28, 1945 (aged 71); New York City, U.S.
- Education: City College of New York
- Occupations: Music critic; Writer; Librettist; Editor-in-chief; Pianist; Composer
- Organizations: Musical Courier; New York Journal-American; CBS Radio
- Parent(s): Max Liebling; Matilde Perkiewicz
- Relatives: Estelle Liebling (sister); Emil, Sally, Georg (uncles)

Leonard Liebling (February 7, 1874 – October 28, 1945) was an American music critic, writer, librettist, editor, pianist, and composer. He is best remembered as the long-time editor-in-chief of the Musical Courier from 1911 to 1945.

== Life and career ==
Born into a Jewish family in New York City, Liebling was the son of composer Max Liebling (1845–1927) and his wife Matilde née de Perkiewicz. His father and his three uncles, Emil, Sally, and Georg Liebling, were all pupils of Franz Liszt and had successful careers as pianists and composers. His brother James Liebling was also a professional musician, and his sister Estelle Liebling was a soprano with the Metropolitan Opera who became a famous voice teacher and coach.

After graduating from the City College of New York in 1897, Liebling pursued music studies in Berlin where he was a pupil of Leopold Godowsky (piano), Theodor Kullak (piano), Karl Heinrich Barth (piano), and Heinrich Urban (composition). He then worked as a concert pianist and piano teacher in Europe before returning to the United States to join the staff of the Musical Courier, a music journal published weekly, in 1902. He remained with that publication until his death 43 years later, first serving as a music critic, and then rising to post of editor-in-chief from 1911 to 1945. Liebling's column in the Musical Courier was entitled "Variations", and he was known for his insightful wit. He also concurrently served as music critic for the New York Journal-American from 1923 to 1936. In 1904 he married Eda Baxter of Brooklyn.

Outside of music criticism, Liebling wrote the libretti for at least four comic operas: The Glass Blowers (1908, music by John Philip Sousa), The Girl and the Kaiser (1910, with music by Georg Jarno), Vera Violetta (1911, with music by Edmund Eysler), and Frederick Lonsdale and Frank Curzon's The Balkan Princess (1911 Broadway version). As a composer he wrote an orchestral overture, a trio, several works for solo piano, and several art songs. He was an active member of the Lotos Club and The Lambs. He also served as the arbiter for the nationally broadcast radio quiz show So You Think You Know Music from 1939 to 1941 on CBS Radio.

Liebling died of a heart attack at the Hotel Buckingham, now The Quin, in New York City in 1945.
