= Ruth Pryor =

- Born: Ruth Pryor Swanson; June 21, 1906; Chicago
- Died: May 31, 2001 (aged 94); Albuquerque, New Mexico
- Spouse: Kent Buckingham
- Dancing career
- Dances: First American ballerina to dance as the Swan Queen in Swan Lake

Ruth Pryor (1906-2001) was a Chicago ballet dancer and instructor, and the first American ballerina to dance the role of the Swan Queen in Swan Lake, in 1930. She was known for "her feat of whirling thirty-six times a minute on her toes," according to the Purple Parrot of Northwestern University.

== Dance career ==
Like many ballet dancers, Pryor began her career while she was a child, and appeared in her first show “Blossoms” at the age of 14. Pryor continued her career as a vaudeville performer, appearing with Beatrice Gardel in “Dances Here and There.” During the 1920s, Pryor danced as a soloist for the Chicago Civic Opera Company and Pavley-Oukrainsky Ballet Company and School, participating in some of the successful productions of Swan Lake and Aida. Pryor spent the 1930s in touring companies, and performed with the Merhoff Quartet in the 1940s. She corresponded with dance critic Ann Barzel.

She founded the Ballet Russe Academy in 1950, and the Ballet Theater Dance School in Cleveland, Ohio, which she ran for 25 years. Canadian dancer John Begg began teaching for Ruth Pryor in 1959. She also helped found ballet companies in Cleveland and Akron, Ohio.

She continued to have a successful career into the 1970s. In 1972, Dennis Nahat and former Pryor student, Ernie (Ian) Horvath purchased her one-room studio in the sub basement of the Masonic Temple in downtown Cleveland. The new school was named Cleveland Dance Center, soon to become the official School of the new Cleveland Ballet.

Her students included Dick Blake, Joyce B. Kneuss, Cheryl Rauschenberger, Ian Horvath, and Denise Gula.

Pryor died in 2001, at age 94.
