= Georg Liebling =

German pianist and composer

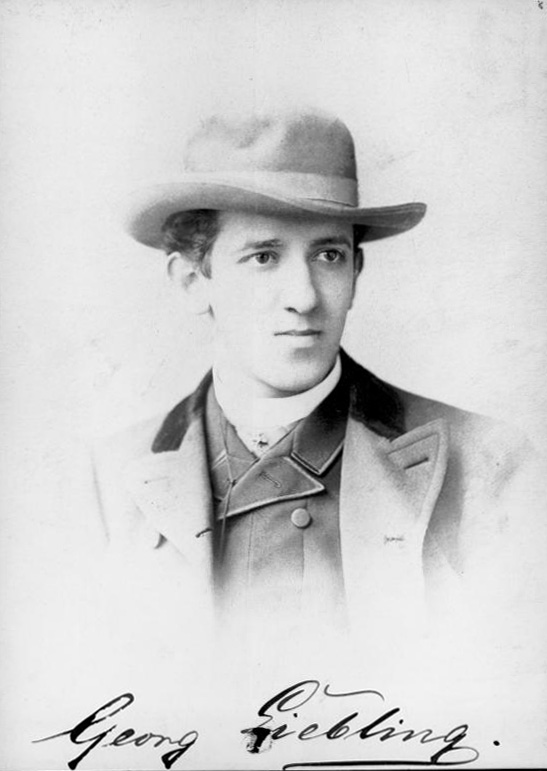
- Georg Liebling in the 1890s
- Born: 22 January 1865; Berlin, Germany
- Died: 7 February 1946 (aged 81); New York City, U.S.
- Occupations: Concert pianist; Composer; Music educator
- Organizations: Court pianist for Ernest II, Duke of Saxe-Coburg and Gotha; Kullack Conservatory in Berlin; Guildhall School of Music; Hollywood Conservatory of Music

Georg Liebling (22 January 1865 – 7 February 1946) was a German pianist and composer. Part of the Liebling family of musicians, he had an active international career as a concert pianist and accompanist from the 1880s into the 1920s. He also worked as a piano teacher for most of his life, beginning that occupation at the age of 16 and continuing up until his death more than 50 years later. He taught on the faculties of the Kullack Conservatory in Berlin (1881–1889), the Guildhall School of Music in London (1898–1906), and the Hollywood Conservatory of Music in the early 1930s in addition to teaching privately in Berlin, Munich, and New York City. As a composer, his salon compositions are noteworthy, especially the Air de Ballet and Romance; a gavotte, and the vocal Lieblingswalzer. Also notable is his 1908 opera Die heilige Katharina.

== Early life and career in Germany and as a touring pianist ==
Born in Berlin, Liebling was a child prodigy on the piano and began his studies at a young age at the Kullak Conservatory where he was a pupil of Theodor Kullak and his son Franz. He was from a prominent Jewish family of musicians. His three brothers, Sally, Emil, and Max Liebling, were also successful pianists, and all four of them studied the piano with Franz Liszt at some point during their training. The four brothers also had success as composers in addition to being notable performers. His older brother Max moved to New York City as a teenager having already had a career as a concert pianist in Europe. Max was the father of several successful musicians, including the soprano and famous voice teacher Estelle Liebling; the cellist James Liebling; and the music critic, pianist, composer, and opera librettist Leonard Liebling.

In addition to his training on the piano, Liebling studied music composition with Heinrich Urban and Albert Becker, and orchestration with Heinrich Dorn. By the age of 16 he was teaching students of his own as a member of the piano faculty at the Kullak Conservatory, and began his career as a concert pianist at the age of 17 touring throughout Germany and Austria. His studies with Liszt were in Weimar in 1883–1884 after this tour. In October 1884 he made his Berlin recital debut at the Sing-Akademie zu Berlin. In 1885 he was the accompanist of the violinist sisters Teresa and Maria Milanollo for their tour of Germany, including performances at the Berliner Philharmonie. He toured Europe as a concert pianist and recitalist from 1885 to 1889, performing for Nicholas II of Russia, Oscar II of Sweden, Princess Stéphanie of Belgium, Luitpold, Prince Regent of Bavaria, and Louis IV, Grand Duke of Hesse among other notable individuals.

In 1890 Georg became court pianist for Ernest II, Duke of Saxe-Coburg and Gotha. In the mid 1890s he assisted his nephew Leonard in establishing his career as a concert pianist in Europe by including him within his own concerts.

== Career in London ==
From December 1897 through July 1898 Liebling gave a series of ten recitals at St James's Hall in London which were well received by critics; drawing particular praise for his performances of works by Beethoven, Liszt, and Chopin in addition to his own compositions. He was engaged by conductor and composer Stewart Macpherson to perform Beethoven's Piano Concerto No. 5 in March 1898 with the Westminster Orchestral Society at Westminster Town Hall. He performed with that organization again in the world premiere of Macpherson's Concertstück, a work for piano and orchestra, at St James's Hall on 11 May 1898.

In August 1898 Liebling joined the piano faculty of the Guildhall School of Music in London. That same month both he and his wife were invited to Osborne House by Queen Victoria to perform for Her Majesty, and he was presented with a diamond pin as a gift from the Queen in addition to joining her for a private dinner. He remained active as a concert pianist in London and a teacher at the Guildhall School of Music through 1906.

== Later life and career in Germany and the United States ==
Liebling returned to Germany in 1906 where he was active as a pianist and teacher in Munich and Berlin into the 1920s. His opera Die heilige Katharina premiered at the Stadttheater Koblenz on 8 March 1908.

In 1923 he and soprano Elsa Alsen performed in a twenty-week-long concert tour in the United States. He taught at the Hollywood Conservatory of Music in California in the early 1930s, where one of his students was composer and pianist Edith Wire. He was active as a teacher of piano in New York City during the latter part of his life. He died there in 1946.
