= Eleanor French =

American singer (1915–1975)

Eleanor French, also known by her married name Eleanor French Booraem, (6 August 1915— 2 February 1975) was an American singer who had a prominent career in nightclubs and cafes during the 1930s and 1940s. She also made four short films and performed on American radio and television.

== Life and career ==
Eleanor M. French was born in Michigan on 6 August 1915. She was the daughter of Ward French who in 1950 was elected chairman of the board of directors of Columbia Artists Management. Her mother was Virginia French (née Collier). She studied singing in New York City with Estelle Liebling.

French had a prominent career in nightclubs and cafes during the 1930s and 1940s; working mainly in New York City but also in other cities like Chicago and Los Angeles. She sang popular songs of the period, mainly from the Great American Songbook. In New York City she was a headline performer at the Trianon Room, Hotel Ambassador the Rainbow Room, and the Stork Club. In Chicago she was a headline entertainer at the Drake Hotel. According to one reviewer, her voice was best suited for the intimate atmospheres of cafes.

French would also occasionally sing on the radio. and she starred in four jukebox short films known as "Soundies" which were made to promote songs; a precursor to the music video. These included films of her singing "Zing! Went the Strings of My Heart", Cy Coben's "Spin the Bottle", "You're Dangerous", and "I'm Just Wild about Harry” (music and lyrics by Noble Sissle and Eubie Blake). She also performed on American television in July 1941.

French went on a dinner date with Cary Grant in 1936. On 14 April 1951 she married Hendrik Booraem Jr in Westport, Connecticut. Her husband worked as a television executive.

Eleanor French died at the age of 59 on 2 February 1975 in Manhattan.
