= Nightingale (Alyabyev song) =

Russian art song by Alexander Alyabyev

"Nightingale" (Russian: Соловей) is a Russian-language art song by Russian composer Alexander Alyabyev (1787–1851) based on the poem "Russkaya pesnya by Anton Delvig. It was composed in 1826 while Alyabyev was in prison. The song is a showpiece for coloratura sopranos and is the only work of Alyabyev to become part of the standard performance repertory.

== Text and composition ==
The poem itself was probably developed by Delvig during the summer of 1825 from the words to a folk-song melody, as were many of the poems in his Russian Melodies. Alyabyev did not know Baron Delvig, so probably encountered the poem as printed as "Russian Melody No. 6" in the second volume of Delvig's and Pushkin's almanac Northern Flowers, which was approved for printing by the censor on 26 February 1826. Accounts of the composition of the song vary – one has it that the composer had his piano delivered to his damp cell.

Соловей мой, соловей,
Голосистый соловей!
Ты куда, куда летишь,
Где всю ночку пропоешь?
Соловей мой, соловей,
Голосистый соловей!

Кто-то, бедная, как я,
Ночь прослушает тебя,
Не смыкаючи очей,
Утопаючи в слезах?
Соловей мой, соловей,
Голосистый соловей!

Побывай во всех странах,
В деревнях и городах:
Не найти тебе нигде
Горемычнее меня.
Соловей мой, соловей,
Голосистый соловей!

My Nightingale, nightingale,
Vociferous Nightingale!
Where are you, where are you flying,
Where will you sing all night?
My nightingale, nightingale,
vociferous nightingale!

Someone, poor like me,
The night will listen to you,
Without closing your eyes,
Drowning in tears?
My nightingale, nightingale,
vociferous nightingale!

Visit all countries,
In villages and cities:
You will not find anywhere
more miserable than me.
My nightingale, nightingale,
vociferous nightingale!

== Performance in Russia ==
Due to the composer's imprisonment and then exile in Tobolsk, the exact circumstances of the song's first performances are unclear. Whatever the case, the song quickly became known in the salons of Saint Petersburg, which would likely include being performed in the salon of Delvig's own wife where singers such as the tenor Nikolai Kuzmich Ivanov premiered new works. The romance was performed on 7 January 1827 from the stage of the Bolshoi Theater in Moscow. Having been textually drawn from folk-song material, and the setting by Alyabyev very emphatically playing on folk elements, and being playable by amateurs, the song gradually acquired folk song status.

== Reception in the West ==
The song became one of the earliest Russian art songs to become widely known in Western Europe. The song became known outside Russia after Pauline Viardot introduced it into Rosina's singing lesson scene in Rossini's The Barber of Seville. In this she was followed by the Italian sopranos Adelina Patti and Marcella Sembrich and others. By the early years of the twentieth century, the song had become a popular choice to showcase singers who would add their own cadenzas to ornament the melody. Vocal pedagogue Estelle Liebling wrote an English-language adaptation of the song which was published under the title "The Russian Nightingale" in 1928. That translation has been used widely in the United States.

== Adaptions by other composers ==
- Mikhail Glinka wrote piano variations based on the song while studying with Siegfried Dehn.
- Mily Balakirev also wrote piano variations on the song.
- Franz Liszt made a transcription of the song (S. 250/1).
- Umberto Giordano's opera Fedora uses the tune in its aria "La donna Russa"

No other composer set the Delvig poem after Alyabyev. "Solovey", Op. 60, No. 4 by Tchaikovsky is a setting not of the Delvig poem but of a different and more complex poem by Pushkin.

== Selected recordings ==
- Olimpia Boronat, 1908
- Antonina Nezhdanova, 1908
- Rita Streich, in Russian with RIAS-Orchestra with Kurt Gaebel 1954
- Natalie Dessay, in Russian with Berliner Sinfonie-Orchester, Michael Schønwandt EMI 1998
