= Devora Nadworney =

American opera singer (1895–1948)

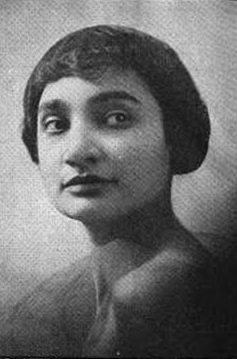
- Devora Nadworney, from a 1921 publication
- Born: 1895; New York City
- Died: January 7, 1948 (age 52); New York
- Occupation: Contralto opera singer

Devora Nadworney (1895 – January 7, 1948) was an American operatic contralto singer.

== Early life ==
Nadworney was born in New York City, the daughter of Russian immigrants. She lived in Bayonne, New Jersey, and attended the Bayonne High School. She went on to attend Hunter College, where she received her B.A. She later taught elementary school while studying music in New York at the Aborn School of Opera. She also studied with Johanna Bayerlee and Estelle Liebling. She sang on benefit programs with opera stars during World War I.

In 1921, she won a prize from the Tri-City Convention of the National Federation of Music Clubs. A year later, in 1922, she was given the National Prize for Voice.

== Career ==
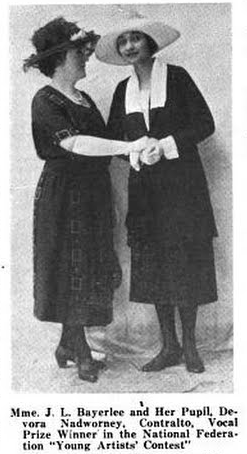
Johanna Bayerlee and Devora Nadworney, from a 1921 publication.

Nadworney was a contralto singer. "Few young contraltos at present before the public can rival the equipment of Devora Nadworney", commented one publication in 1918. She was under the management of Annie Friedberg in 1918, and sang at Liberty Loan fundraisers and gave concerts for the troops stationed near New York City during World War I. She sometimes gave concerts of Russian folk songs while dressed in traditional embroidered costume. She was also popular as a church soloist, in oratorios. In 1921 she made a recording for the Victor Talking Machine Company.

Nadworney had the distinction of being the first singer heard over a radio network in the United States, in 1928. Through the 1920s and into the 1930s she was especially active in radio. She sang the lead in Carmen on air in 1925, and Aida in 1926, both with the WEAF Grand Opera Company, under conductor Cesare Sodero. She was associated with the Chicago Civic Opera from 1925 until at least 1934. In 1943, she was a soloist for the Naumburg Orchestral Concerts, in the Naumburg Bandshell, Central Park, in the summer series.

In 1945 she sang at a noon concert at New York City's Town Hall.

== Personal life and legacy ==
Devora Nadworney married lawyer Herman Spingarn in 1935; and they divorced in 1941. She died in 1948, aged 52 years, in New York. Her obituary listing in Billboard Magazine described her as a "pioneer radio contralto... one of the first singers to perform over radio."

The National Federation of Music Clubs offers the Devora Nadworney Award for young composers.
