= Adamo Didur =

Polish singer (1874–1946)

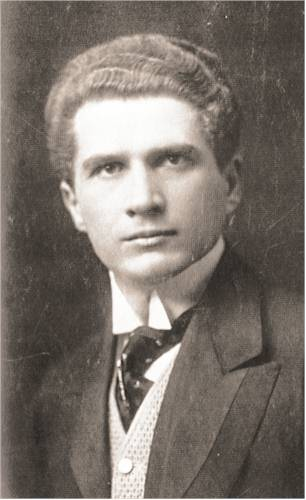
Adam Didur

Adam Didur or Adamo Didur (24 December 1874 – 7 January 1946) was a famous Polish operatic bass singer. He sang extensively in Europe and had a major career at New York's Metropolitan Opera from 1908 to 1932.

== Career ==
Didur was born on 24 December 1874 in Wola Sękowa near Sanok, Poland. Didur studied in Lwów with Walery Wysocki and later with Franz Emmerich in Milan. He made his vocal debut as a soloist at a concert performance of Ludwig van Beethoven's Ninth Symphony in Milan, Italy. His operatic stage debut came in 1894 as Méphistophélès in Gounod's Faust in Rio de Janeiro. Besides South America, he also toured Egypt and Italy in 1894, including the small town of Pierolo near Turin where he met his first wife, a Mexican singer named Angela Aranda Arellano.

After steady years at Warsaw Opera from 1899 to 1903, Didur launched a career at major European opera houses. His guest appearances in Spain and Russia in 1903 were followed by La Scala years 1903-1906, first appearing there as Wotan in Das Rheingold. His debut at London's Royal Opera House, Covent Garden, was in the role of Colline in La bohème on the opening night of the 1905 season. He travelled later to Argentina, singing in Buenos Aires in the 1905–1908 operatic seasons. In 1914, he returned to London to sing Baron Archibaldo at the British premiere of Montemezzi's L'amore dei tre re and a few other roles.

Didur's North American debut was as Alvise in Ponchielli's La Gioconda at the second season opening of Hammerstein's Manhattan Opera House. It was the night of "Golden Age" stars, also featuring American debuts of Giovanni Zenatello as Enzo and Jeanne Gerville-Réache as La Cieca, while Lillian Nordica sang the title role, Mario Ancona was Barnaba and Eleanora de Cisnero was Laura. A year later, Metropolitan Opera engaged Didur as Méphistophélès in Gounod's Faust at the inauguration of the new Brooklyn Academy of Music to be followed two days later by his Ramfis in Giuseppe Verdi's Aida. On this all-star opening night of the 1908 season, Arturo Toscanini was in the pit and the rest of the cast included Emmy Destinn in her Met debut as Aida, Enrico Caruso (Radames), Louise Homer (Amneris) and Antonio Scotti (Amonasro). He remained with the company for a quarter of a century and became one of its principal bass singers, counting 933 performances in 55 roles.

In 1913, Didur appeared at the Met in the title role of Boris Godunov, the American premiere of Mussorgsky's opera. Didur created roles in the world premieres of three operas by Giacomo Puccini at the Met: La fanciulla del West in 1910 and Il tabarro and Gianni Schicchi of the Il trittico trilogy in 1918. He also appeared at the world premiere of Humperdinck's Königskinder. Didur's other important "firsts" at the Met include the US premieres of Mozart's Così fan tutte, Smetana's The Bartered Bride, Borodin's Prince Igor (singing both Prince Galitzky and Khan Konchak), and Montemezzi's L'amore dei tre re. He also sang under the baton of Gustav Mahler in Mozart's Le nozze de Figaro, Smetana's The Bartered Bride and the Met premiere of Tchaikovsky's The Queen of Spades. Didur's last appearance at the Met was in the role of Coppélius in Les Contes d'Hoffmann on 11 February 1932. His voice had been on the wane for some time and he returned to live in Europe.

Two months before the outbreak of World War II, Didur was appointed director of the Warsaw Opera, but the 1939 bombardment, almost completely destroying the opera house, made work impossible. He continued his work as a professor in Lwów and then Katowice, where he also started working on founding an opera company. Soon after the war ended in 1945, he was appointed the first director of the Silesian Opera., which opened with the performance of Moniuszko's opera Halka that Didur produced.

Didur died on 7 January 1946 in Katowice.

== Family ==
Didur was twice married; with his first wife, the Mexican singer Angela Aranda Arellano (1874–1928), he had five children, two of whom later became singers themselves, including Eva Didur and Olga Didur-Wiktorowa. After her death he married the French dancer Marguerite Vignon in 1928.

== Legacy ==
Didur's large, sonorous and rich-toned voice was in its prime between the late 1890s and the World War I period. It was particularly suited to the performance of Italian operas. He was a versatile stylist. His unusual agility and his wide vocal range allowed him to also sing baritone roles such as Tonio in Pagliacci and Count Almaviva in Le nozze de Figaro. Although chiefly a basso cantante, Didur could effectively deliver deep richness of basso profondo that made him one of the foremost interpreters of Boris Godunov. He was also especially praised for his portrayal of Mefistofele in both Gounod's and Boito's operas, and Rossini's Don Basilio. He made many recordings of operatic arias for several labels including Fonotipia and Pathé which are available on CD transfers.

== Selected repertoire ==
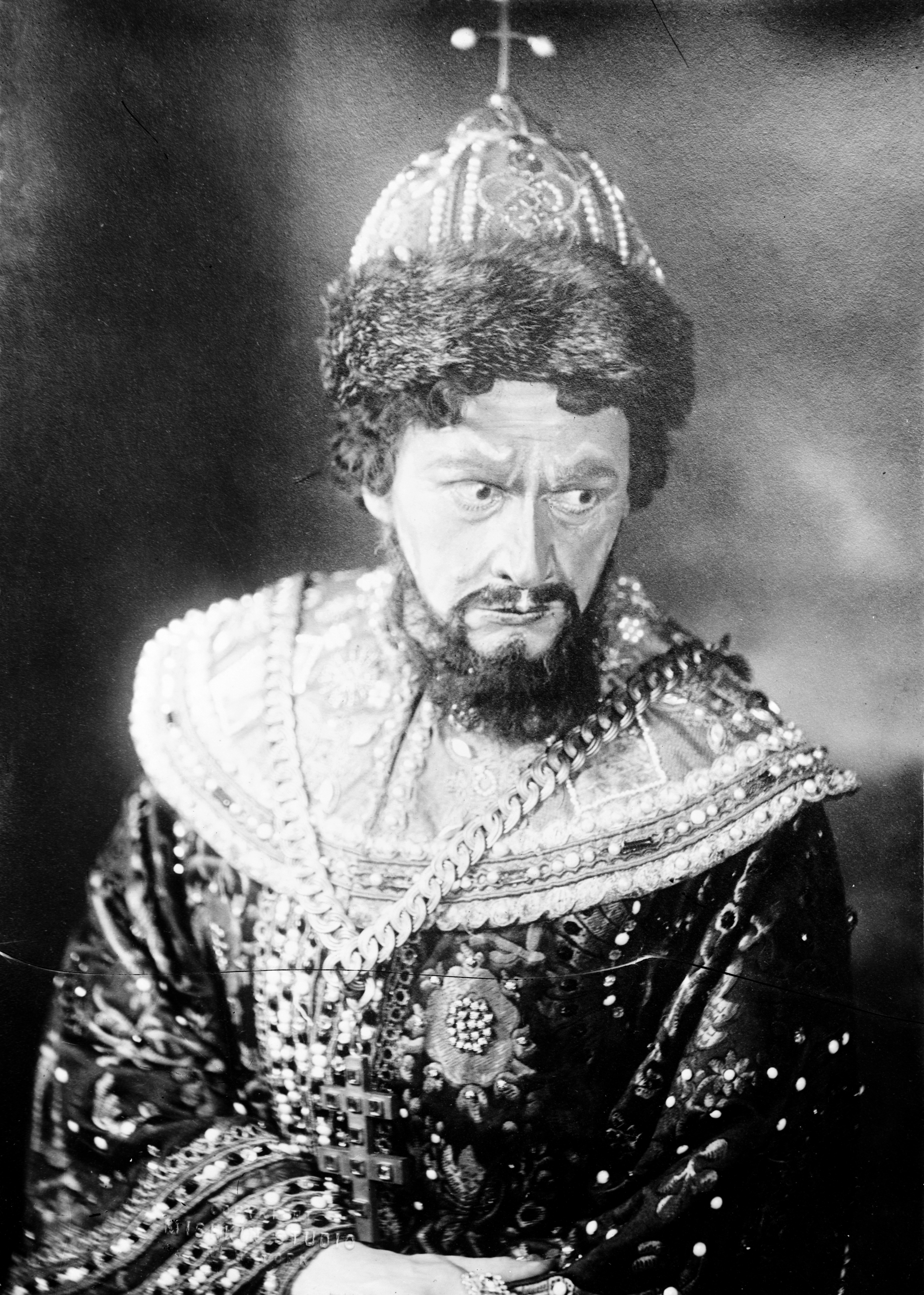
Didur as Boris Godunov in the 1913 American premiere

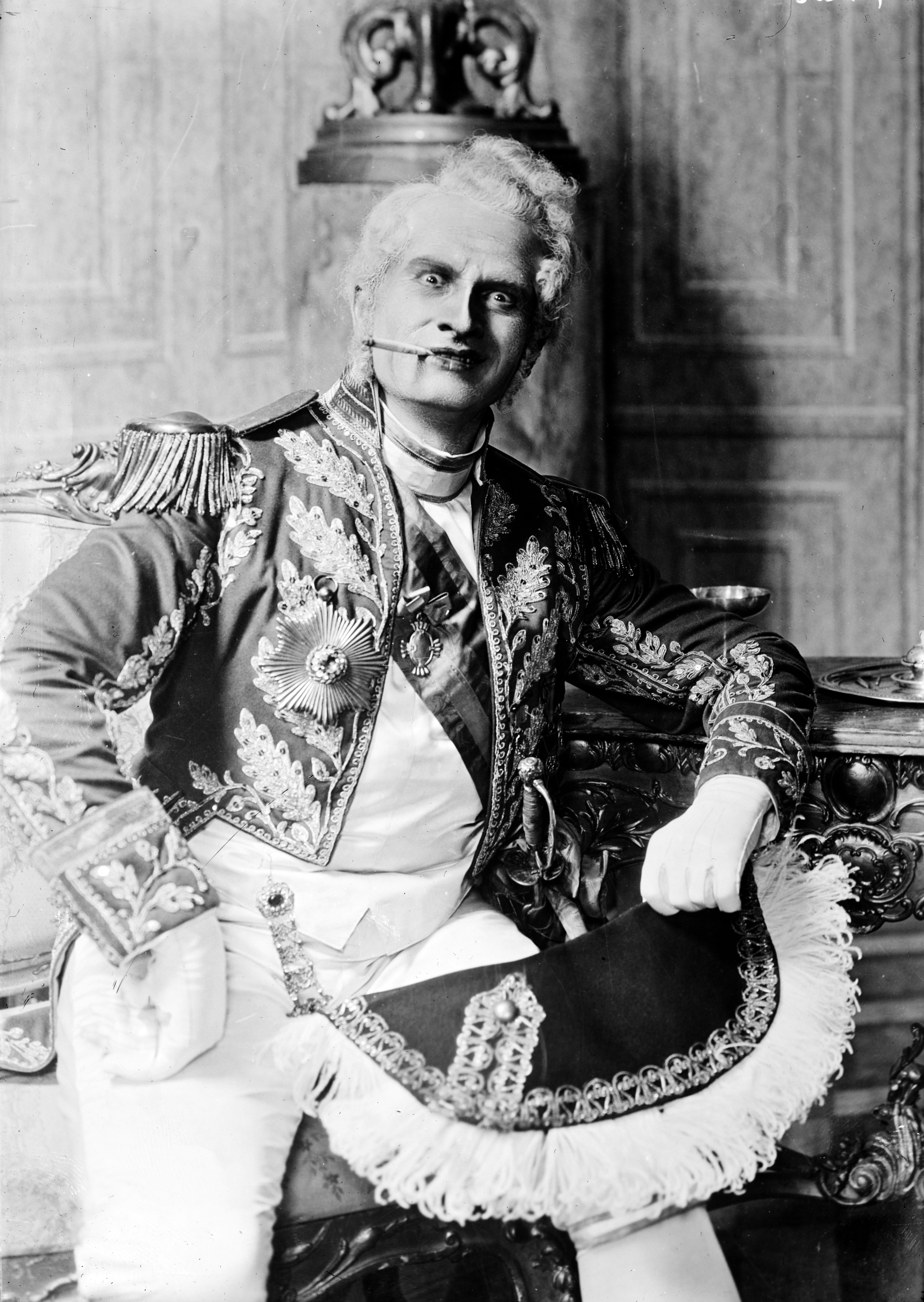
Didur in Eugene Onegin

- Méphistophélès in Faust by Gounod
- Boris in Boris Godunov by Mussorgskij
- Marcel in Les Huguenots by Meyerbeer
- Ramfis in Aida by Verdi
- Colline in La Bohème by Puccini
- Mefistofele in Mefistofele by Boito
- Coppélius in Les Contes d'Hoffmann by Offenbach
- Sparafucile in Rigoletto by Verdi
- Galitskij in Prins Igor by Borodin
- Leporello in Don Giovanni by Mozart
- Archibaldo in L'amore dei tre re by Montemezzi
- Filippo II in Don Carlo by Verdi
- Don Basilio in Il barbiere di Siviglia by Rossini
- Figaro in Le nozze di Figaro by Mozart
- Count Almaviva in Le nozze di Figaro by Mozart
- Tomskij in Spardame [The Queen of Spades] by Tchaikovsky
- Kecal in Prodaná nevěsta [The Bartered Bride] by Smetana
- Tonio in I pagliacci by Leoncavallo
- Klingsor in Parsifal by Wagner
- Oberthal in Le prophète by Meyerbeer
- Don Alfonso in Così fan tutte by Mozart
- Mustafà in L’Italiana in Algeri by Rossini
- Alvise Badoero in La Gioconda by Ponchielli
- Scarpia in Tosca by Puccini
- Billy Jackrabbit in La Fanciulla del West by Puccini
- Talpa in Il Tabarro by Puccini
- Simone in Gianni Schicchi by Puccini
- Trehogger in Königskinder by Humperdinck
- Il Cieco in Iris by Mascagni
- Franz in Lodoletta by Mascagni
- Gremin in Eugene Onegin by Tchaikovsky
- Pistol in Falstaff by Verdi
- Giovanni Filippo Palm in Germania by Franchetti
- Hu-Tsin in L’Oracolo by Leoni

== Discography ==
Didur recorded for G & T, Fonotipia, Pathé and Brunswick labels. Selections from his recorded arias and songs were reissued on compact discs:

- Lebendige Vergangenheit, Preiser (89198)
- Club "99" (CD 99-89)
- Hafg (Hamburger Archiv für Gesangskunst ) Vol. 1, 1904-16 (10073)
- Hafg (Hamburger Archiv für Gesangskunst ) Vol. 2, 1900-03 (10074)
