= Lecuona =

Lecuona is a surname of Basque origin, from leku (place) and -ona (good). It can refer to the following people:

- Ernestina Lecuona y Casado (1882–1951), Cuban composer and pianist
- Ernesto Lecuona (1895–1963), Cuban composer and pianist, brother of Ernestina
- Iker Lecuona (b. 2000), Spanish MotoGP rider
- Margarita Lecuona (1910–1981), Cuban singer and composer
- Rafael A. Lecuona (1928–2014), Cuban gymnast, nephew of Ernestina and Ernesto
- Ximena García Lecuona, Mexican-American screenwriter
