= The Rondoliers =

The Rondoliers was the name of an American vocal ensemble in the United States. In the beginning, the group was an all-male vocal quartet that was popular on American radio and on recordings during the late 1920s. and 1930s. In 1929 the group's membership included Fred Wilson (first tenor), Ernest Ebler (Second tenor), George Gove (bass), and Hubert Hendrie (baritone). Members of the group changed across time with the following additional singers being members of the group at one time or another during the 1930s: Royal Hallee, Earl Palmer, Kenneth Schon, and Artells (sometimes spelled Artella) Dickson. The group made numerous recording for Columbia Records from 1930-1933. These works are catalogued in the Discography of American Historical Recordings.

In November 1933 and February 1934 The Rondoliers performed with Paul Whiteman and his orchestra on Kraft Musical Review. By 1943 the ensemble was under the direction of Artells Dickson (also known as Art Dickson ) who had studied singing with Estelle Liebling. By this time the group had evolved from a male quartet into a mixed-gender vocal ensemble whose members included Dickson, Mimi Walthers, Dorrit Merrill LaRue, and Don Gautier. This line-up of the group was featured in several "Soundies" in 1943; a film precursor to the music video.
