= Eva Didur =

Polish dramatic soprano singer (1896–?)

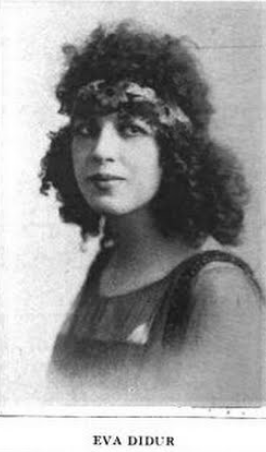
- Didur in a 1919 publication
- Born: 1896; Poland
- Occupation: Soprano
- Years active: early 1900s
- Style: Opera
- Relatives: Adamo Didur (father); Olga Didur-Wiktorowa (sister)

Eva Didur (born 1896), also known as Ewa Didur, was a Polish dramatic soprano singer.

== Early life ==
Eva Didur was born in Poland, the daughter of Polish singer Adamo Didur and his first wife, Mexican singer Angela Aranda Arellano. Her younger sisters were Mary Didur-Załuska (1905–1979) and Olga Didur-Wiktorowa (1900–1963), who were also professional singers. Eva Didur studied voice with William Thorner and Gina Ciaparelli-Viafora.

== Career ==
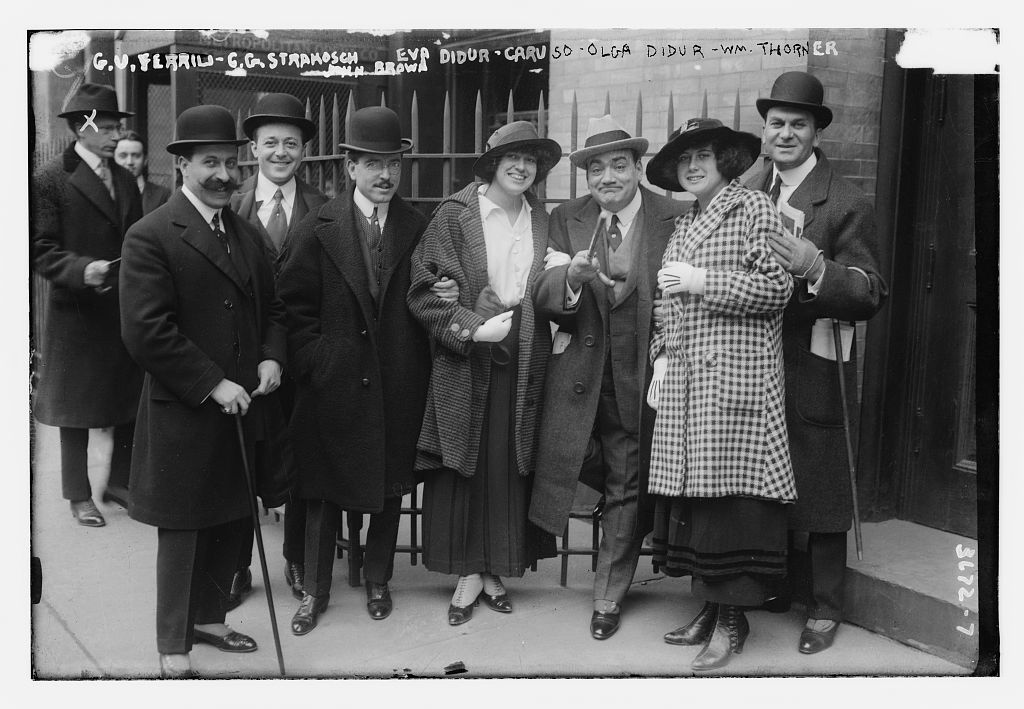
G.U. Ferrili, C.G. Strakhov, John Brown, Eva Didur, Enrico Caruso, Olga Didur, and William Thorner at the Metropolitan Opera in 1915

Didur made her concert debut at the Metropolitan Opera House in 1918, a concert in which she "exhibited a fine, powerful powerful soprano and decided dramatic temperament." She sang at the Hippodrome with her father in December 1918. She went to Italy in 1919, where she sang the part of Mimi in La bohème in Milan. She was engaged to sing in Trieste during the 1919–1920 opera season. In 1921, she was back in Milan to sing the part of Marguerite in Mefistofele, under the direction of her godfather, Arturo Toscanini.

Didur sang at many benefit events during World War I. In 1917, she performed at a concert with pianists Ignacy Jan Paderewski and Zygmunt Stojowski for the Polish Victims War Relief Fund. She performed with her father at a benefit for the Russian Relief Fund at Carnegie Hall and at another benefit for the Polish Army Hospital in France, at Aeolian Hall, a few weeks later. In the summer of 1918, she sang the Polish national anthem and other music at a "Polish Night" stadium concert in New York, under the direction of Arnold Volpe, and at a Red Cross benefit concert on Long Island.

== Personal life ==
As a young woman, Eva Didur was close friends with silent film actress Dagmar Godowsky.
