= Chicago Civic Opera =

Opera house in Chicago

The Civic Opera Company (1922–1931) was a Chicago company that produced seven seasons of grand opera in the Auditorium Theatre from 1922 to 1928, and three seasons at its own Civic Opera House from 1929 to 1931 before falling victim to financial difficulties brought on in part by the Great Depression. The company consisted largely of the remnants of the Chicago Opera Association, a company that produced seven seasons of grand opera in the Auditorium Theatre from 1915 until its bankruptcy in 1921.

== Chicago Opera Association ==
The Chicago Opera Association produced seven seasons of grand opera in Chicago's Auditorium Theatre from 1915 to 1921. The founding artistic director and principal conductor was Cleofonte Campanini, while the general manager and chief underwriter was Harold F. McCormick. When Campanini died in December 1919 he was replaced by the composer Gino Marinuzzi, who staged his own Jacquerie as the opening production of the 1920–21 season.

In January 1921, operatic diva Mary Garden was appointed music director (or "Directa" as she styled it) and the recently divorced McCormick promised to pay that year's difference exceeding $100,000, the previous high being $300,000. He planned on this being his last season, and he called in Mary Garden to finish the company with style. The subsequent blow-out season was finished with the hugely expensive world premiere of Sergei Prokofiev's The Love for Three Oranges, which had been commissioned by the Opera Association. This, and other extravagances on Mary Garden's part, ended the season with a deficit of $1,100,000, most of which was paid for by the McCormick fund. Mary Garden as "Directa" for one season cost $750,000 more than any single season of opera in Chicago at that time. Coming as it did during a business recession, these deficits bankrupted the company.

=== Notable singers ===
- Georges Baklanoff
- Charles Dalmorès
- Alice D'Hermanoy
- Hector Dufranne
- Florence Easton
- Anna Fitziu
- Amelita Galli-Curci
- Mary Garden
- Gustave Huberdeau
- Frances Ingram
- Nina Koshetz
- Edith Mason
- Mary McCormic
- Carmen Melis
- Tamaki Miura
- Lucien Muratore
- Claudia Muzio
- Giovanni Polese
- Rosa Raisa
- Tito Schipa
- Emilio Venturini
- Alice Verlet
- Olivia Monona

== Formation of the Civic Opera Company ==
The Civic Opera was formed by reorganizing the bankrupt of the Chicago Opera Association in 1921. Opera Association general manager Harold F. McCormick resigned and was replaced by utilities magnate Samuel Insull, while sixteen of the eighteen directors were carried over from the old company. The new Civic Opera also fell heir to Mary Garden as musical director as well as all of the costumes, scenery, and other resources of the defunct Opera Association. The Civic Opera Company was Chicago's first real world class Opera Company, it was also a "democratic" opera company, aiming for a popular audience. Productions were supposed to based upon what the people wanted, though they turned out to be the Italian repertory that the sponsors and the executives favored and the modern French operas beloved of reigning diva Mary Garden, while German works and operetta were sadly neglected.

The Civic Opera Company opened on November 13, 1922 with a stunning performance of Aïda. This was a traditional opera to start with and was obviously the choice of Insull and not Mary Garden, who was the champion of French opera and had a more modern taste in music. Typical of what she would have chosen would have been Pelléas et Mélisande, a role Debussy had written for her. This is almost the opposite of Insull's taste in opera, he preferred older pieces in Italian, such as works by Verdi, Puccini, and Rossini. This tension was resolved by having an almost equal number of Italian and French operas a year, contrary to practice at virtually any other opera house outside France, with other languages wildly under represented. Sometimes even Russian operas, such as Boris Godunov, were performed in French.

== New Opera House ==
Originally, like Chicago Opera Association, the Civic Opera Company was housed in the Auditorium theater. This theater was superlative for singing, the acoustics were and are second to none, but there was no back stage to speak of. This limits the productions possible to put on and that can be housed at one point in time, a limit that both Insull and Garden chafed under, so very early on, Insull decided that there would be a new opera house. The new Civic Opera House would be marginally smaller in seat capacity than the auditorium, but this was out-weighed by the back stage space which was to be larger than any other back stage space at that time, and the acoustics were not quite as good as that of the auditorium, but they are still very good. The building of the new opera house was to be semi-financed by Insull, and the rest would be leveraged in with bonds to be held by the Metropolitan Life Insurance Company. The original plan was that the Civic Opera would retire these bonds over the next eighty years with rents from a 28-story office tower above the theatre. Thus they would completely own the building and rentals from the office space would subsidize the Civic Opera Company.

In the 1950s the theater became the home of the Lyric Opera of Chicago.

== Bankruptcy ==
This was a magnificent plan and would have worked wonderfully, except that opening night ironically fell on November 4, 1929 (again with a delightful performance of Aida) less than a month after the Black Tuesday stock crash. This catastrophe, coupled with the extravagance of the new house, were body blows at the financial health of the civic Opera, starting a chain reaction. Soon Insull, the financial mainstay, lost control of his utilities and transportation companies and became unable to under-write Civic Opera. Mary Garden, the star-power and resident genius of Civic, never happy with the new opera house, retired abruptly after a performance of Massenet's Le jongleur de Notre-Dame at the end of the 1931/2 season. Finally, on June 23, 1932, Civic Opera declared bankruptcy and was forced to liquidate.

== See also ==
- Lyric Opera of Chicago
- Harriet Lundgren (1922-1932), prima ballerina
- Mary McCormic
- Ruth Pryor
