= Musical Courier =

American music trade magazine (1880–1962)

- Categories: Trade magazine
- Frequency: Weekly
- Founded: 1880
- Final issue: 1962
- Country: United States
- Based in: New York City
- Language: English

The Musical Courier was a weekly 19th- and 20th-century American music trade magazine that began publication in 1880.

The publication included editorials, obituaries, announcements, scholarly articles and investigatory writing about musical instruments and music in general. These included construction practices, descriptions, tools, exhibitions collections, new technologies, and laws and legal actions relating to the music industry. There were articles on companies and manufacturers of instruments, entries on patents, trade marks, and designs for new or improved instruments, as well as reporting on "African-American music and culture, women's rights, John Philip Sousa, Antonín Dvořák and the influence of the rise of Nazi Germany on music in Europe."

In 1897, Marc A. Blumenberg, the publisher, separated the musical and industrial departments of the magazine and began publishing the Musical Courier Extra strictly as a trade edition."

In the 1890s, a separate edition was published in England. Composer, pianist, opera librettist, and music critic Leonard Liebling served as the publication's editor-in-chief from 1911 to 1945.

Former University of Southern California professor Lisa Roma, an operatic soprano, acquired it in 1958. She was the publisher and owner from 1958 to 1961. The magazine ceased publication 1962.
