= Caro nome che il mio cor =

Aria from the opera Rigoletto by Verdi

Soprano Marion Talley performing the aria in 1926

"Caro nome che il mio cor" (Sweet name that made my heart), or "Caro nome" for short, is an aria for coloratura soprano from act 1 of Verdi's opera Rigoletto.

It is part of the standard Italian soprano vocal repertoire, featured in numerous anthologies for soprano singers and in albums of highlights from the opera. It is often performed in recitals and used as an audition piece by soprano singers. It is very slow, and includes extended high notes which require strong stamina and breath control, and also features a challenging coloratura section which demonstrates the singer's dexterity and accuracy.

== Sentiment ==
Gilda, Rigoletto's naive, virginal daughter, dreamily muses on the name of the man with whom she is in love, unaware that it is a false name and that he is not who he pretends to be.

"Caro nome" is Gilda's first extended expression of independent emotions, and shows both her tenderness and her simplicity. The aria is preceded by a shimmering figuration described by Verdi scholar Julian Budden as an example of Verdi's finest woodwind writing. This aria is a breathtaking portrayal of young love in all its innocence and idealism. It marks the first step in Gilda's transformation from ingénue to self-sacrificing heroine.
