= Stefano Ballarini =

Hungarian-born American baritone

Istvan Balla, better known by the names Stefano Ballarini, Stephen Ballarini, and Stephan Ballarini (19 October 1902 – 26 May 1979) was a Hungarian-born American baritone. A native of Budapest, he was trained in Germany and made his stage debut at the Oper Breslau in 1925. He had a career at opera houses in Europe for the next eleven years, performing leading roles at La Scala, the Berlin State Opera, and the Vienna State Opera among other places. He made multiple appearances at the Teatro Colón from 1931-1934. He relocated to the United States where he made his American debut at the Chicago City Opera Company in October 1936. After marrying an American woman in 1938, he became a naturalized American citizen in 1939. He performed with multiple opera companies in Philadelphia during the 1930s and 1940s, and was a regular performer with the San Carlo Opera Company from 1938-1949. On Broadway he portrayed Mr. Martini in the world premiere of Walter Damrosch's The Opera Cloak in 1942 at the Broadway Theatre. He also sang in concerts with American orchestras, including performances with the New York Philharmonic and the Philadelphia Orchestra. His final appearance was at the New York City Opera in 1952. His voice is preserved on several recordings made during the late 1920s and early 1930s on various record labels in France, Italy, and Germany.

== Early life and career in Europe and Argentina ==
Istvan Balla was born on 19 October 1902 in Budapest, Hungary. He trained as an opera singer in Germany, and made his professional debut at the Oper Breslau in 1925 at which time he adopted the stage name Stefan Balla. He was committed to that theatre for the 1925-1926 season. Following this he modified his name to Stefano Ballarini when he went on a tour of France and Italy in 1926-1927. He continued to perform under various variations of this name during his career, among them Stephen Ballarini and Stephan Ballarini.

In 1928 Ballarini performed the role of Donner in Richard Wagner's Das Rheingold at La Scala under the baton on Ettore Panizza. He then worked mainly in Germany and Austria where he was a principal guest artist at the Berlin State Opera (1929-1930), the Dresden State Opera (1930-1931), the Vienna Volksoper in (1932-1933), and the Vienna State Opera (1935). In 1936 he was a guest artist at the Hungarian State Opera.

Ballarini also appeared at the Teatro Colón (TC) in Argentina; making his debut at that house in 1931. He returned in 1933 for a season of German language operas conducted by Roberto Kinsky. Later at that theatre he appeared as Count Lamoral in Argentina's first performance of Richard Strauss's Arabella on August 16, 1934, and was the baritone soloist in Argentina's first performance of Johann Sebastian Bach's St Matthew Passion on 25 September 1934 under conductor Fritz Busch. Other operas he performed in at the TC included Bedřich Smetana's The Bartered Bride (1934).

== Later life and career in the United States ==
By the autumn of 1936, Ballarini had arrived in the United States and was studying singing in New York City with Estelle Liebling. He made his United States debut using the name Stefano Ballarini with the Chicago City Opera Company (CCOC) in Ottorino Respighi La fiamma on October 31, 1936. This was followed by the part of Escamillo in Georges Bizet's Carmen with the CCOC in November 1936 with Gertrud Pålson-Wettergren in the title role. He repeated the latter role with the Philadelphia Civic Grand Opera Company (PCGCO) at Philadelphia's Academy of Music in February 1937, and two months later performed the part of Scarpia in Giacomo Puccini's Tosca with the PCGCO.

In July 1937 Ballarini performed the roles of Donner and Alberich in Das Rheingold at Lewisohn Stadium with the New York Philharmonic under conductor Fritz Reiner. In August 1937 he performed the role of Escamillo opposite Irra Petina as Carmen with the Philadelphia Orchestra under conductor Alexander Smallens at the Robin Hood Dell. In December 1937 he portrayed Sharpless in Madama Butterfly with the PCGCO with Annunciata Garrotto as Cio-Cio-San and Lawrence Power as Pinkerton. In 1938 he was committed to the touring San Carlo Opera Company (SCOC); and by February 1938 he was in Dallas with the company performing Escamillo to Maru Castagna's Carmen with Aroldo Lindi as Don Jose. Castagna was replaced as Carmen later in the season by Janet Fairbank when the SCOC reached Chicago. Other parts he performed with the SCOC in 1938 included Amonasro in Aida with Bianca Saroya in the title role, and Germont in La traviata with Mary Henderson as Violetta.

On 2 August 1938 Ballarini married Maybelle Louise Iribe in Carson City, Nevada. In 1939 he became a naturalized American citizen with his official name on US government documents being Steven Balla-Ballarini. He continued to perform with the SCOC in 1939. That same year he made his debut with the San Francisco Opera as Lord Enrico Ashton in Lucia di Lammermoor with Lily Pons in the title role and Tito Schipa as Sir Edgardo di Ravenswood. In 1941 he performed the role of Friedrich of Telramund opposite Rose Bampton's Elsa in Wagner's Lohengrin with the Chicago Opera Company.

In February 1942 Ballarini performed at a meeting of The Verdi Club in New York City; a group founded and organized by Florence Foster Jenkins. He performed with the Philadelphia La Scala Opera Company (PLSOC) at the Academy of Music as Alfio in Cavalleria rusticana in January 1942, and as Conte di Luna in Verdi's Il trovatore with Bernardo de Muro as Manrico in March 1942. On November 3, 1942 he created the role of Mr. Martini in the world premiere of Walter Damrosch's The Opera Cloak at the Broadway Theatre in New York City.

In 1943 Ballarini returned to the PLSOC as Escamillo to Jennie Tourel's Carmen, and sang the part of Alfio under conductor Carlo Peroni. That same year he returned to the SCOC as Ashton in Lucia di Lammermoor with Grace Panvini in the title role. In 1944 he portrayed the title role in Rigoletto with the SCOC, repeated the roles of the Count di Luna and Amonasro, and performed the role of Valentin in Faust with Eugene Conley in the title role. In 1945 he performed the role of Alfio with the Chicago Opera Company with Ella Flesch as Santuzza, and was once again touring with the SCOC in the role of Rigoletto.

In 1946 Ballarini performed the role of Valentine in Faust with the SCOC with Mario Palermo in the title role, and sang Escamillo to Coe Glade's Carmen with the same company. In 1947 he performed the roles of Schaunard in La bohème and Tonio in Pagliacci at Carnegie Hall with Alfredo Salmaggi's opera company. He was once again with the SCOC in 1949; notably portraying Sharpless in Madame Butterfly with Hizi Koyke in the title role.

In June 1952 Ballarini performed the role of Sharpless to Uta Graf's Butterfly at the Teatro Bolívar in Ecuador. In November 1952 he performed the role of Escamillo to Margery Mayer's Carmen for his debut at the New York City Opera under conductor Joseph Rosenstock. It was his final appearance on the stage.

Ballarini died at the age of 76 in Miami, Florida on 26 May 1979.

== Recordings ==
Ballarini recorded music in Paris in 1927 with Pathé Records. He then worked in Berlin with the Ultraphon record label in 1929-1930, and also made recordings with Fonotipia Records in Italy. His recordings include arias from Rigoletto, Un ballo in maschera, and Pagliacci, and the songs "Lolita" by Arturo Buzzi-Peccia and "Visione Veneziana" by Renato Brogi.
