= Grace Angelau =

American opera singer (1899–1958)

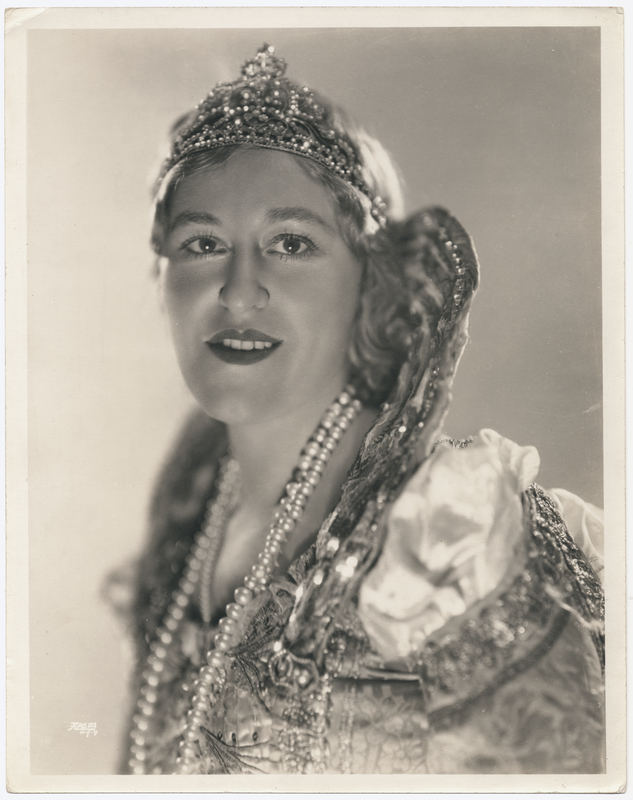
Grace Angelau as Léonor de Guzman in Gaetano Donizetti's La favorite (c. 1930)

Grace Angelau (1899 – October 1958) was an American opera singer who had an active international career in operas and operettas in the 1920s, 1930s, and early 1940s. At various times in her career she was billed as a contralto and a soprano, but a 1942 article summarizing her career in Pix magazine labeled her as a mezzo-soprano. In the United States she appeared in operas in several theatres on Broadway, and was active with the touring San Carlo Opera Company, the Chicago Opera Company, and the New York Hippodrome Opera. She also appeared at European opera houses like La Scala, and at theaters in Australia, and Central and South America. She was particularly admired for her performances of Amneris in Giuseppe Verdi's Aida and Azucena in Verdi's Il trovatore. She owned and operated the Coonara Springs Restaurant & Gardens, now listed on the Victoria Heritage Database of historical sights, in Olinda, Victoria, Australia, during the 1940s. Many of her costumes, jewelry, photographs, and other personal artefacts are part of the Australian Performing Arts Collection at the Arts Centre Melbourne.

== Early life and career ==
Born Grace A. Strasburger in Philadelphia, Pennsylvania in 1899, Angelau was the daughter of Emmanuel Strasburger and Maud Strasburger (née Hay, 1871 – January 17, 1954, Oriskany, New York). She was educated at Desborough Academy in her youth before beginning her vocal studies with Louis Aschenfelder at the Pittsburgh Musical Institute where she gave a recital in 1917 as a soprano. She pursued further studies with baritone Dr. Fery Lulek at the Chicago Musical College which she attended on a vocal scholarship; she gave a recital there in 1922 as a contralto. She pursued further vocal studies in New York City with Estelle Liebling, the voice teacher of Beverly Sills, in the 1920s and 1930s.

Angelau made her Broadway debut in 1922 at the Broadhurst Theatre in the ensemble of Hugo Felix's operetta Marjolaine. In 1925 she was a Court Lady in the original production of Rudolf Friml's The Vagabond King at the Casino Theatre on Broadway. That same year she was a featured singer in concerts given in the Grand Ballroom of the Hotel Astor in New York City by the Drama-Comedy Club. In 1925 she was the Vice Chairman of the Professional Women's League in New York City; an organization which gave her a platform for her New York recital debut in 1926. She became a singer on radio in New York City in 1926, at which time she was billed as a contralto.

== Performances in the 1930s ==
In 1930 Angelau had a critical triumph at the Teatro Dal Verme in Milan, Italy as Azucena in Giuseppe Verdi's Il trovatore. She was a leading mezzo-soprano internationally during the 1930s, performing roles at La Scala and other European opera houses as well as theaters in South America, Central America, Canada, England, and the United States. Some of the roles she performed internationally included Leonora in Donizetti's La favorite, Adalgisa in Vincenzo Bellini's Norma, the title role in Georges Bizet's Carmen, and numerous roles in operas by Verdi. In 1932 she toured Australia with the Imperial Grand Opera Company, and she made several appearances with the National Theatre, Melbourne in the late 1930s and early 1940s. Many of her costumes, jewelry, photographs, and other personal artifacts are part of the Australian Performing Arts Collection at the Arts Centre Melbourne.

In 1933 Angelau portrayed the role of Amneris in Verdi's Aida at the Broadway Theatre, 53rd Street, with Della Samoiloff as the title heroine. She returned to Broadway later that year as Azucena at the Forrest Theatre with Marguerite Ringo as Leonora and Pasquale Ferrara as Manrico, and Rocco Pandiscio as Count di Luna. In July 1933 she performed the role of Siébel in Charles Gounod's Faust to a crowd of 1,800 people at Atlantic City's Steel Pier. She was heard again at that location the following September as Pitti-Sing in Gilbert and Sullivan's The Mikado.

In 1934 Angelau appeared regularly on WMCA (AM) radio in New York City, at which time she was billed as a soprano. In March 1934 she appeared at the Cosmopolitan Theatre in New York City as Amneris, and she returned to the Broadway Theatre as Laura Adorno in Amilcare Ponchielli's La Gioconda in April 1934. She became a member of Fortune Gallo's touring San Carlo Opera Company that same year, starring in performances of Verdi's Rigoletto as Maddalena and Azucena in Il trovatore in New York and San Francisco under conductor Carlo Peroni. With that company she performed with singers Josephine Lucchese, Anna Leskaya Asch, Sydney Rayner, Aroldo Lindi, Mostyn Thomas, Natale Cervi, and Mario Valle among others. She also performed the role of Azucena with the Chicago Opera Company in 1934 with Caterina Jarboro in the title role and Bernardo de Muro as Radames at the New York Hippodrome. On November 25, 1934 she starred in the world premiere of Jacob Weinberg's opera The Pioneers at the Mecca Temple.

In 1935 Angelau toured the United States with the New York Opera Comique, performing at the Auditorium Building, The Bushnell Center for the Performing Arts in Hartford, Connecticut, and on Broadway among other venues in performances of The Tales of Hoffmann (as Antonia), La Vie parisienne and Die Fledermaus. In 1936 she performed with Alfredo Salmaggi's opera company at the New York Hippodrome and Ebbets Field in Brooklynn in performances of the title heroine in Carmen and Amneris in Aida. In 1937 she appeared as Suzuki in Giacomo Puccini's Madama Butterfly with the San Carlo Opera Company at the Philharmonic Auditorium in Los Angeles. That same year she spent a month performing at the Teatro Municipal of Caracas in a tour organized by opera impresario Giorgio D'Andria at the invitation of President Eleazar López Contreras.

In 1938 Angelau was a member of the New York Grand Opera Company, performing Suzuki to Rose Tentoni's Cio-Cio-San, Armand Tokatyan's Pinkerton, and Joseph Royer's Sharpless at the DAR Constitution Hall in Washington D.C. as well as in New York City. She also performed the role of Azucena to Rose Bampton's Leonora that season. In December 1938 she starred in Rigoletto at The Mosque Theater in Newark, New Jersey with Robert Weede and Jan Peerce. She returned to the New York Hippodrome as Azucena in 1939. She performed at the 20th anniversary concert program of the Catholic Writers Guild at the Waldorf Astoria New York on April 21, 1939.

== Later life ==
In 1938 Angelau married Guy Hutchison who was a former football coach at Amherst College and Yale University, and was Vice President of the Hoffman Specialty Company in New York City at the time of their wedding. In the late 1930s she taught singing at The Alviene School of Dance Arts; an institution which trained Fred Astaire, Una Merkel, and Peggy Shannon. In 1939 she moved with her husband, and their two sons, Guy Jr and Jay Benjamin, to Melbourne, Australia. She retired from the stage in 1941 after purchasing the Coonara Springs Restaurant & Gardens at 129 Olinda-Monbulk Rd in Olinda, Victoria, Australia in the Dandenong Ranges which she operated as a tea room in the 1940s. It is now part of the Victorian Heritage Database of historic sights. Her husband died on December 9, 1941, in Melbourne. His obituary states he had two surviving daughters from a previous marriage, Carra H. Matthews and Marjorie H. Young.

She died in Melbourne, Australia in October 1958.
