= Annunciata Garrotto =

American operatic soprano (1907-1998)

Annunciata Garrotto, also known by her married name Annunciata Power, (5 September 1907 – 26 October 1998) was an American soprano who had an active international career in operas from the early 1930s into the 1950s. A native of Omaha, Nebraska, she studied music at the University of Nebraska Omaha before pursuing further studies in Milan with soprano Lina de Benedetto and in New York City with Estelle Liebling. After making her opera debut in Italy, she toured Europe and Asia with the company of the Teatro di San Carlo in the early 1930s. Also performing in this tour was the tenor Laurence Power who she later married in 1935. The couple would work together frequently as romantic leads in operas during their performance careers.

From 1933-1935 Garrotto was a member of the touring arm of the Chicago Opera Company with whom she most often was heard at the New York Hippodrome. She continued to perform at that theatre frequently throughout the remainder of the 1930s as a member of Alfredo Salmaggi's Hippodrome Opera Company. She also was a leading soprano with other American companies during the 1930s and 1940s; most often working out of the cities of New York, Philadelphia, and Chicago. She retired in 1954 and moved to a farm in Southern Australia with her husband and their two children. After her husband's death in 1963 she moved back to Omaha where she lived until her death in 1998 at the age of 91.

== Early life and education ==
Annunciata "Nunce" Marie Garrotto was born on 5 September 1907 in Omaha, Nebraska. She was an only child. Her father Alfio Garrotto had previously moved to Omaha from Carlentini, Sicily in 1903 at the age of 19; coming to the United States with his wife Concetta Cocugga. Her father established a grocery store in Omaha located at 502 N 16th St, the site of the current Pettit's Bakery.

Garrotto was educated Holy Family School and at Omaha Central High School; graduating from the latter school in 1924. She then studied music and languages at the University of Nebraska Omaha where she graduated in 1928. She spent the next four years studying singing in Italy with her mother living with her during that period. Her teacher in Milan was the soprano Lina de Benedetto. She later studied singing with Estelle Liebling in New York City. Liebling was a renowned voice teacher who taught Beverly Sills along with more than 70 other principal singers at the Metropolitan Opera.

== Career and family in the 1930s ==
Garrotto made her professional debut in the Italian provinces just outside Milan as Mimì in Giacomo Puccini's La bohème while she was training in Italy. She then spent four months performing as a member of the Royal Opera House, Valletta. After this she toured for nine months as a leading soprano with the company of the Teatro di San Carlo on a tour of Europe and Asia in the early 1930s during which she gave more than 150 performances. Her repertoire with the latter company included the title role in Madama Butterfly, Marguerite in Faust, Micaëla in Carmen, and Nedda in Pagliacci.

Garrotto returned to the United States in 1932. She made her American debut in May 1933 performing with her future husband, the tenor Laurence Power at the Omaha Auditorium. The couple had met previously performing together in the San Carlo tour of Europe and Asia. They married in 1935, but Annunciata continued to use her maiden name on the stage. The couple had two daughters, Janet (born February 3, 1938) and Diedre (born 1945), which they raised while living in a Brownstone in New York City while pursuing their performing careers.

Garrotto began her opera career in the United States singing with the Chicago Opera Company (COC) for two seasons. In July 1933 she performed the role of Cio-Cio-San (a.k.a. Butterfly) in Giacomo Puccini's Madama Butterfly at the New York Hippodrome (NYH) on tour with the COC under conductor Giuseppe Bamboschek. She repeated the role at the NYH the following September but with Alfredo Salmaggi's Hippodrome Opera Company. Garrotto was a favorite soprano of Salmaggi and frequently performed with his opera company in the 1930s. She toured with Salmaggi's company to sing Butterfly again at the Boston Opera House in October 1933.

Garrotto was a regular performer at the NYH during the 1930s. At the NYH she performed Desdemona in Giuseppe Verdi's Otello with Pasquale Amato as Iago and Edward Ransome in the title role in October 1933. Her other repertoire at the NYH that year included Marguerite in Charles Gounod's Faust with Francesco Tafuro in the title role. She performed Cio-Cio-San again at the NYH in April 1934, May 1935, November 1936, April 1938, and the autumn of 1939. In December 1936 she portrayed the role of Mimì in La bohème opposite her husband as Rodolfo at the NYH. Her other repertoire at the NYH included Nedda in Pagliacci (1934), Micaëla in Carmen (1935 and 1937), Violetta in La traviata (1936 and 1938), Desdemona in Otello (1937 and 1938), Marguerite in Faust (1937 and 1939),

On November 16, 1935 she was a soloist in a concert given by the New York Mozart Society. In 1936 she performed the role of Cio-Cio-San with the San Carlo Opera Company, and portrayed Marzelline in Beethoven's Fidelio at the Steel Pier Theatre with the Atlantic City Opera Company. In February 1927 she sang the role of Nedda with the Chicago City Opera Company (CCOC) with John Pane-Gasser as Pagliacci. She sang Cio-Cio-San again for debut with the Philadelphia Civic Grand Opera Company (PCGOC) at the Academy of Music in March 1937, and that same month portrayed Violetta with Enzo Dell'Orefice's opera company in Syracuse, New York. In September 1937 she toured to Venezuela to perform in a season of grand opera in Caracas; performing the roles of Cio-Cio-San, Mimì, Nedda, Violetta, Micaëla, and Marguerite on that tour. She returned to the PCGOC in December 1937 to sing Butterfly once again for the company both in Philadelphia, and at the Rajah Temple in Reading, Pennsylavania.

In May 1938 Garrotto returned to the PCGOC to portray Mimì opposite Armand Tokatyan as Rodolfo. In August 1938 she portrayed Violetta in La traviata at the Jones Beach Theater, and that same month performed the role of Micaëla in Carmen with the Philadelphia Orchestra at Robin Hood Dell with Bruna Castagna in the title part. She returned to the CCOC in the 1938-1939 season to perform the roles of Musetta in La bohème Micaëla in Carmen, and Liù in Turandot. In February 1939 she performed the role of Violetta to Jan Peerce's Afredo with the Philadelphia La Scala Opera Company (PLSOC). She returned to the PLSOC the following November and December to perform the roles of Butterfly and Violetta.

== Later career ==
In 1940 Garrotto and her husband gave a concert tour of his native Australia and New Zealand. There they also starred in a series of opera productions in Sydney and Melbourne that were sponsored by the Australian Broadcasting Commission. After this tour was complete, they went on tour throughout Australia as principal singers with J. C. Williamson's opera company for the 1940-1941 season. By May 1941 Garrotto was back in New York City performing Butterfly at Broadway's Majestic Theatre with the Monte Carlo Opera Company in an ill fated production that had technical difficulties with the set that caused it to close early. In 1942 she was once again singing Violetta for an opera company operated by Salmaggi; performing the part at several stadiums in the New York City area. In 1944 she returned to the PLSOC to perform the role of Musetta with Dorothy Kirsten as Mimì, and the role of Micaëla with Castagna as Carmen for performances in Philadelphia and Baltimore. She performed Violetta with PLOC in March 1946 with Franco Perulli as Alfredo.

In 1946 Garrotto and her husband began a concert tour of the United States with performances at Bob Jones University. She starred in several operas staged by Salmaggi at the Brooklyn Academy of Music in the late 1940s. In 1950 she performed the role of Butterfly at a production given at Stephens College in Missouri.

== Later life ==
In 1954 Annunciata Power retired from the stage and moved with her husband and children to Australia.. The family settled on a farm in Southern Australia along the Murray River. After her husband's unexpected death of a heart attack in 1963, she moved back to Omaha where she remained for the rest of her life.

She died at the age of 91 in Omaha, Nebraska on 26 October 1998.
