= Matthew Epstein =

American impresario, artist manager, and opera administrator (born 1947)

- Born: December 23, 1947 (age 78); New York City, New York, U.S.
- Occupations: Impresario, artist manager, opera administrator
- Years active: c. 1970–present
- Known for: Artist management, opera administration, advocacy for American opera

Matthew Allen Epstein (born December 23, 1947) is an American impresario, artist manager, and opera administrator whose career has spanned more than five decades and has included tenures at Columbia Artists Management, Welsh National Opera, and the Lyric Opera of Chicago, as well as a long advisory relationship with the Santa Fe Opera.

== Early life and education ==
Epstein was born in New York City and was raised in both West Hempstead, Long Island, and Manhattan. He developed an early interest in classical music and opera through recordings and performances at the Metropolitan Opera, which he began attending as a standee before high school. Among other performances, he saw Maria Callas's final New York Tosca.

Epstein recalled the early influence of opera recordings owned by his mother, particularly a Madama Butterfly with Renata Tebaldi, a Tosca featuring Tebaldi and Mario Del Monaco, and Joan Sutherland's solo album The Art of the Prima Donna, whose arias he claimed to have memorized and sang between the ages of 14 and 16.

Epstein received a Bachelor of Arts degree from the University of Pennsylvania in 1969.

== Early career ==
Following his graduation from the University of Pennsylvania, Epstein entered the field of artist management. He initially worked in the office of artist manager Harold Shaw, where he gained practical experience in the representation of singers and other performing artists.

Early collaborators included Thomas Stewart and wife Evelyn Lear. Around 1970, Epstein worked with Lear after her voice had declined following a run of dramatic roles, including Lulu and Marie in Wozzeck. Epstein recommended a new voice teacher and a return to the Mozart and Italian repertoire she had sung earlier in her career, saying, "I simply was very honest." Her career recovered in the following years. Around the same time Epstein met and began working with Leonard Bernstein, advising him on vocal casting. With Bernstein he was also involved in the development of the opera A Quiet Place as well as collaborating on recordings and performances of numerous works including Candide and La bohème.

== Columbia Artists Management ==
Epstein subsequently joined Columbia Artists Management (CAMI), one of the most influential artist management firms in the United States. By 1973, he was running his own division at the agency.

In April 1979, Epstein produced a concert performance of Berlioz's Béatrice et Bénédict, conducted by John Nelson and directed by Elijah Moshinsky. Nelson later recalled that Epstein, then a CAMI manager, had encouraged him some years earlier to take on Berlioz's The Trojans to move beyond conducting choral work.

Rather than relying solely on securing engagements, Epstein encouraged clients to take an active role in shaping their own repertoire. One of his clients, American soprano Renée Fleming, described him as stressing "batting instead of fielding", that is: proactively deciding what she wanted to sing rather than simply considering offers as they arose. Under his management, singers received guidance on repertoire, vocal development, language study, and career strategy, and he cautioned against undertaking roles before they were ready.

Among the artists whose careers he helped guide at various stages were Frederica von Stade, Kathleen Battle, Renée Fleming, Tatiana Troyanos Catherine Malfitano, Samuel Ramey, Neil Shicoff, and numerous other singers who would go on to achieve international prominence.

Epstein championed the revival of works by George Frideric Handel and Richard Strauss that had not been staged by New York's major opera companies, and organized a Rossini opera series at Carnegie Hall.

In 1987 Epstein participated in Music for Life, a benefit concert at Carnegie Hall organized to raise funds for AIDS research. Epstein has said he believed he was infected with HIV in the early 1980s and was diagnosed in 1986, when testing became publicly available. He later spoke openly about his diagnosis, including at length in a 1992 profile, and became an advocate for HIV/AIDS awareness and research.

By the late twentieth century, Epstein had become one of the most influential figures in American artist management, helping shape the careers of singers and contributing to broader discussions regarding repertoire, casting, and artistic standards within the operatic profession.

== Santa Fe Opera ==
Epstein's longest professional association was with the Santa Fe Opera, a relationship that began in 1970. During that time he worked as opera planning consultant and later senior artistic advisor, a role he held until 2018, working closely with successive generations of company leadership. He was also closely involved with the company's Apprentice Artists Program, mentoring its participants over the course of his tenure.

Epstein has compared Santa Fe's influence on American opera to that of Glyndebourne in England and the Aix-en-Provence Festival in France.

In 2018, Epstein served as dramaturge for Santa Fe Opera's production of Leonard Bernstein's Candide, staged as part of the company's celebration of Bernstein's centenary.

== Welsh National Opera ==
In 1991 Epstein was appointed general director of Welsh National Opera (WNO), becoming the first American to lead a major British opera company.

Epstein assumed leadership during a period marked by continuing debate over public support for the arts in the United Kingdom. Like many cultural institutions in the early 1990s, Welsh National Opera faced financial uncertainty arising from changing funding priorities and pressures on government arts expenditures

Epstein's tenure at WNO ended in 1994, after the announcement of a number of budget cuts

== Lyric Opera of Chicago ==
Epstein worked in various artistic leadership roles at the Lyric Opera of Chicago from 1980 to 2005. He joined the company as an adviser to general manager Carol Fox, continued under Ardis Krainik and later William Mason, and was appointed artistic director in 1999, succeeding Bruno Bartoletti.

During his years in Chicago he worked closely with general directors Carol Fox, Ardis Krainik, and William Mason, as well as music directors Bruno Bartoletti and Sir Andrew Davis.

From 1992 to 2004, the Lyric Opera of Chicago commissioned a series of operas from composer William Bolcom as part of an effort to expand the American opera repertoire, an initiative Epstein oversaw. McTeague, based on the novel by Frank Norris and directed by Robert Altman, premiered in 1992; A View from the Bridge, adapted from the Arthur Miller play, followed in 1999; and A Wedding, also directed by Altman, premiered on December 11, 2004.

Other Lyric premieres during Epstein's tenure included Philip Glass's Satyagraha and John Corigliano's The Ghosts of Versailles, Anthony Davis's Amistad, and Kurt Weill's Street Scene.

Epstein championed contemporary and rarely staged works at the Lyric, citing the 1987 productions of Satyagraha and Lulu and Peter Sellars's 1988 staging of Tannhäuser as evidence that Lyric's traditional audience would embrace such repertoire. In the same year, he brought Peter Stein's production of Verdi’s Falstaff to the Lyric. "I don't know of another company where modernity and tradition are combined so well", he said.

Lyric announced in December 2004 that it would not renew Epstein's contract, citing differing visions for the company between Epstein and general director William Mason. He left the company the following spring.

== Post-Lyric Opera of Chicago career ==
Following his departure from the Lyric Opera of Chicago in 2005, Epstein returned to Columbia Artists Management, where he became director of vocal divisions. In this role he continued to oversee the careers of established and emerging singers while advising opera companies, orchestras, festivals, and presenters throughout North America and Europe.

Epstein remained active in artist management until his retirement from Columbia Artists Management in 2010. Even after formally retiring from full-time management, he continued participating in master classes, interviews, and advisory work concerning the future of opera, artist training, repertory development, and institutional leadership.

In recognition of his contributions to the field, Epstein was inducted into the inaugural class of the Opera Hall of Fame, established by Opera America in 2020.
