= Hizi Koyke =

Japanese singer

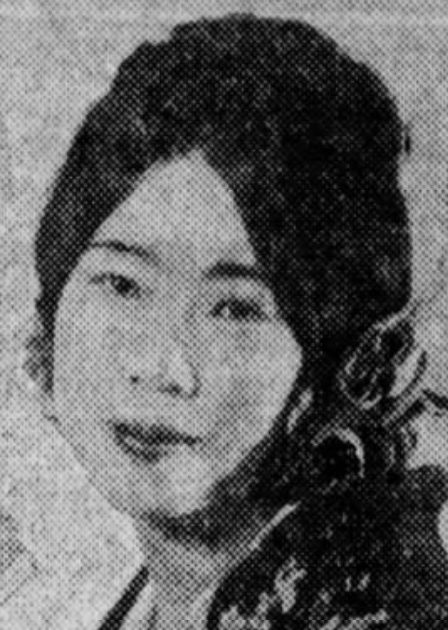
- Hizi Koyke, from a 1928 newspaper.
- Born: Koike Hisako; 1902; Tokyo
- Died: September 1991 (aged 88–89); New York
- Occupation(s): Singer, opera director
- Relatives: Fortune Gallo (father-in-law)

Hizi Koyke (1902 – September 1991), born Koike Hisako, was a Japanese singer based in the United States.

== Early life ==
Koike Hisako was born in Tokyo, the daughter of a glass manufacturer. Her mother died in childbirth. Her parents were converts to Christianity and she attended a Methodist missionary school. She convinced her father to let her leave the country, and an American doctor and his wife took her on as a foster child. The couple took her to Canada, then moved to New York in 1923 so she could attend Columbia University to train as a teacher. While in New York, she took voice lessons with Edythe Magee, and attended the Metropolitan Opera to learn more about Western opera.

== Career ==
Koyke was nearly always cast in Asian roles, especially as Yum-Yum in The Mikado, and with the San Carlo Opera Company as Cio-Cio-San in Puccini's Madama Butterfly, a role she studied under Tamaki Miura. She made her New York debut in 1927, in David Belasco's Madame Butterfly, and continued playing in productions of that show for several years, across the United States and Canada. For added authenticity, she designed her own costumes. She also appeared in Mascagni's Iris (1930), The Geisha (1931), and Leoni's L'Oracolo (1937). She gave recitals and sang on radio through the 1930s. "Koyke is Butterfly," commented critic Samuel T. Wilson in 1932, "not merely because of her nationality but because she is a fine singer, a most talented actress, and, in the best sense of the word, an artist."

Koyke's career was interrupted by the attack on Pearl Harbor and the United States' entry into World War II, when a Japanese singer and shows with Japanese themes were not welcomed by American audiences. She didn't perform during the war. She was monitored by the FBI but did not spend time in a Japanese internment camp. She resumed her singing after the war, returning to her signature role in Madame Butterfly in 1946. She sang in Butterfly until at least 1950, and retired from the stage in 1955, but continued working in opera as a director with the Chicago Lyric Opera. She was the stage director for Maria Callas' 1955 performance of Butterfly. She was featured in a 1964 educational program about opera on a Texas public television station, aimed at schoolchildren who would be attending an opera in Dallas.

== Personal life ==
Koyke married fellow singer Harald Hansen in 1932; they divorced in 1940 after he was discovered cheating on her. She married again to Edward Mario Gallo, son of opera producer Fortune Gallo. She died in New York in 1991.
