= Edvige Vaccari =

Italian opera singer

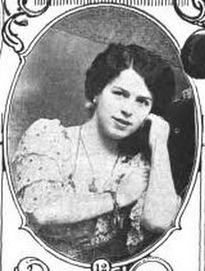
- Edvige Vaccari, from a 1917 publication.
- Born: 1886; Italy
- Died: March 13, 1974 (aged 87–88); Lima, Peru
- Occupation: coloratura soprano

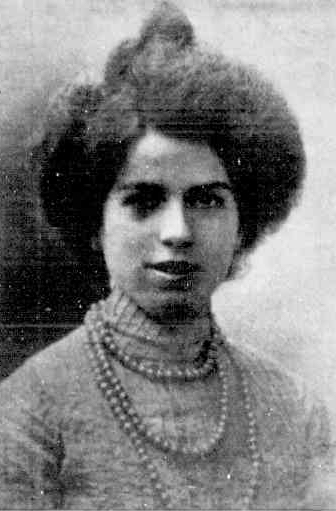
Edvige Vaccari, from a 1901 publication.

Edvige Vaccari (1886, Italy – 13 March 1974, Lima, Perú) was an Italian coloratura soprano singer in opera; she toured in Australia and performed in Mexico before joining the San Carlo Opera Company for several seasons, and was compared to Luisa Tetrazzini in publicity.

== Early life ==
Edvige Vaccari was described as being from Florence; a more fanciful profile described Vaccari as being raised in a castle overlooking Turin, and educated in Paris. Another source locates her birthplace in Bergamo. She was said to be "just turned 26" in 1916, placing her birth in 1890; but she was singing opera in Australia in 1901 and 1902, and reported to be about 19 years old at that time, which places her birthdate in the early 1880s.

== Career ==
Edvige Vaccari was sometimes known as the "Second Tetrazzini" or "Little Tetrazzini", for her voice, roles, and small stature. She sang with the Italian Opera Company managed by J. C. Williamson in Australia in 1901 and 1902. She also sang for two seasons in Mexico City, as a member of the National Opera Company. She toured North America with Fortune Gallo's San Carlo Opera Company from 1913 to 1922. Her repertoire included Musetta in La bohème, Rosina in The Barber of Saville, Lucia in Lucia di Lammermoor, Olympia and Antonia in Tales of Hoffmann, Nedda in Pagliacci, Violetta in La Traviata, Lady Harriet in Martha, Marguerite in Faust, and Gilda in Rigoletto. "As is the case of most coloratura divas," one reviewer commented of Vaccari, "her soprano is small but very flexible, and, what is more, retains its tone quality throughout all registers and intricate passages."
