= Laurence Power =

Australian cricketer

Personal information
- Born: 31 July 1898; Adelaide, Australia
- Died: 20 March 1963 (aged 64)
- Source: Cricinfo, 21 September 2020

Laurence James Power (31 July 1898 – 20 March 1963) was an Australian cricketer who played in one first-class match for South Australia in 1920/21, but is better known as Lawrence Power, operatic tenor, a.k.a. Lorenzo Poerio. He was married to the soprano Annunciata Garrotto.

== Early life and education ==
Power was born in Adelaide, a son of Nicholas Joseph Power (died 22 November 1952) and Ellen May Power, née Hammill (died 16 September 1948), who married in 1895. They had a home on Hill Street, North Adelaide, later 4 Seawall, Glenelg.

Educated at St Laurence's, Ovingham, he won a scholarship to Christian Brothers' College, passed his Intermediate and Leaving examinations, necessary for admission to university, but chose to enter the office of G. R. Annells, accountant and amateur cricketer. A year later, after passing the public service examinations, he started work in the offices of the South Australian Railways. After five years he transferred to the Railways' accounts office at Mile End, meanwhile studying for Federal Institute of Accountants qualifications.

== Career ==
He had always been torn between two loves — sport and music. At school he was a champion handballer and played in the top cricket and football teams (his brother John Leslie Power, born 1896, was similarly gifted, and a great scholar as well). Now he was involved in club cricket, as captain, and interstate and international cricketer (against England 1920), also interstate handball and baseball. But music was slowly encroaching. With encouragement from Mrs Quesnel, his singing teacher at the Elder Conservatorium, he entered the Sun Aria contest in 1924 and not only won the prize, but was advised by the adjudicator, Alfred Hill, to make opera his profession. He was immediately signed up by Hoyts for a four month tour, at five times his Railways salary. At the close of this series and an appearance at the Royal Apollo Club in Sydney, a wealthy admirer (later revealed as his uncle Fred Tennant (Note: Frederick Augustus Tennant (22 July 1874 – c. 20 November 1937) married Kathleen Hammill, a sister of Power's mother, on 28 October 1914, and had no children of their own. Fred was the youngest son of Andrew Tennant, pastoralist and politician.)) offered to underwrite his further education in Milan, no small undertaking, as winners of Elder Scholarships would attest. He returned to Adelaide to prepare for his exodus and gave three farewell concerts: at the Adelaide Town Hall, and for his workplace colleagues at the Railways Institute (in the old Cheer-up Hut) and for supporters from school and church at the Calaroga Hall, (Note: The Calaroga Hall, at the corner of Jeffcott and Childers streets, North Adelaide, was built for the Dominican Fathers and the parish of St Laurence in 1923, and seated 700. One of its first functions was a recital featuring Alice Mallon.) North Adelaide. He left Adelaide by the SS Osterley on 4 December 1925.

In Rome, he was received by Pope Pius XI, and given a letter of introduction to Sig. Scandiani, manager of La Scala, Milan, who met him graciously; later met teacher Mario Pieraccini, whose opinion, said Adelaide baritone Frank Halls, really mattered, and was curtly brushed off. He began studying under Pieraccini the following day. After some 18 months' study — study in the morning, and Italian language, singing and acting in the afternoon — he landed a job for virtually no pay, in a small town, Lovere, singing Donizetti's difficult, little-performed opera La favorite, and was well received. Successive contracts were more attractive, until a few months later he was playing Rudolph in La bohème at Dal Verme, a venue in Milan second only to La Scala. Six and a half years after arriving in Milan he was receiving top billing. In 1932 he signed a contract with the "San Carlo Grand Opera Company" touring the Dutch East Indies and the Orient with a repertoire of 16 operas, but after six months of four or five performances a week in sweltering climates, he cut short his tour and headed back to Australia, arriving in Adelaide in time for Christmas. In all likelihood his uncle Fred Tennant caught up with the company at Surabaya. Mario Royo sang the tenor part, Cavaradossi, in Tosca in Manila, Philippines on 2 November 1932.

During his stay in Adelaide, Power attended cricket matches and caught up with his uncle Fred. He had a reunion dinner with his old St Laurence's Church choir, then left for Melbourne, sailing by the SS Mariposa for San Francisco on 7 March 1934.

There were two San Carlo Grand Opera companies. The one that had toured the East was expected to play Sydney for Sir Benjamin Fuller and Hugo Larsen in March 1933, but the Australian tour was cancelled after the Japan season was extended, while the other company was touring the US.

Laurence and Annunciata Garrotto (1907–1998), prima donna of the San Carlo company, shared the concert stage in Omaha, Nebraska, and were well received. In June he took part in a radio broadcast from New York City, and shortly afterwards was signed to the Chicago Opera Company for a season at the New York Hippodrome, appearing in Rigoletto, La Traviata, Madame Butterfly and La Bohème, to favorable mentions in the New York Times. He made headlines when Arnoldo Georgewski, playing Faust to basso Nino Ruisi's Mephistopheles, suddenly lost his voice. Power, from the audience, provided the voice and saved the day. Power played opposite Garrotto, in Madame Butterfly, which was praised by the "Norfolk, New Jersey" (perhaps Norfolk, Virginia) Ledger-Dispatch. On 5 March 1935, Power and Garrotto married at St Patrick's Cathedral, New York. Both were under contract to the Chicago Opera, whose impresario, Alfredo Salmaggi, acted as best man. A daughter, Jeannette Patricia Power, was born in March? April? 1938. His mother and her sister, the recently widowed Mrs Tennant, then left to visit them in New York.

In late 1947, Power flew back to Adelaide on hearing that his mother was dangerously ill. She recovered, and Power returned to America, but not before making one public appearance on 8 January 1948 at Port Pirie, at a fundraising event for rebuilding St Mark's Catholic church, which had been destroyed by fire on 21 October. Support was given by violinist Louise Hakendorf, Alice O'Donnell, Mary Hakendorf and local musicians. The event was touted as a thankyou to E. H. D. Russell MHR who had somehow organised an airline seat at short notice. His mother died that September.

== Publications ==
Power wrote several articles for the Adelaide press:

- "Office Stool to Grand Opera". The Mail (Adelaide). Vol. 21, no. 1, 081. South Australia. 11 February 1933. p. 3 – via National Library of Australia.
- "Laurence Power's Story of Operatic Rise (1)". The Mail (Adelaide). Vol. 21, no. 1, 082. South Australia. 18 February 1933. p. 3 – via National Library of Australia.
- "Laurence Power's Climb to Operatic Fame". The Mail (Adelaide). Vol. 21, no. 1, 083. South Australia. 25 February 1933. p. 3 – via National Library of Australia.
- "Laurence Power Tells of Life in Italy". The Mail (Adelaide). Vol. 21, no. 1, 084. South Australia. 4 March 1933. p. 5 – via National Library of Australia.

== See also ==
- List of South Australian representative cricketers
