= Carol Fox =

Carol Fox may refer to:

- Carol Fox (Chicago opera) (1926–1981), first impresario of the Chicago Lyric Opera
- Carol Fox (figure skater), American figure skater

== See also ==
- Fox (surname)
