= Nicola Rescigno =

Conductor

Nicola Rescigno (photo with dedication)

Nicola Rescigno (May 28, 1916 – August 4, 2008) was an Italian-American conductor, particularly associated with the Italian opera repertory. Opera News said that "Rescigno was a seminal figure in the history of opera in America, a maestro and mentor who shaped the destiny and reputation of two major U.S. companies — Lyric Opera of Chicago and Dallas Opera — as well as countless singing and conducting careers. Vigorous musical integrity, idiomatic style and unfailing support of his singers were the hallmarks of his performances throughout his distinguished career, which lasted more than fifty years."

== Biography ==
Born into a musical family in New York City, he studied with Pizzetti, Giannini and Polacco. He made his debut in 1943, conducting La traviata, at the Brooklyn Academy of Music for Alfredo Salmaggi's opera company. He then toured the United States with the San Carlo Opera Company, serving as the company's music director from 1944-1947.

In 1944-48, and 1953 he conducted the Naumburg Orchestral Concerts, in the Naumburg Bandshell, Central Park, in the summer series.

In this period he also took music director posts with the Connecticut Opera and Havana Opera. He made his conducting debut with the San Francisco Opera in 1950 conducting Lily Pons in The Barber of Seville and Dorothy Kirsten in Madama Butterfly.

In 1953, Rescigno co-founded the Lyric Opera of Chicago with businesswoman and amateur singer Carol Fox and businessman Lawrence V. Kelly, serving as the company's artistic director and principal conductor from 1954 to 1956. For the company's inaugural performance he conducted Maria Callas in her American debut in the title role of Bellini's Norma. He went on to collaborate with the famous soprano several more times, including conducting her only stage appearances as Cio-Cio-San (Chicago, 1955) and her 1959 Carnegie Hall concert of Il pirata.

In 1957, Rescigno co-founded the Dallas Opera with Kelly after the two left Chicago following a dispute with the Lyric board. He served as artistic director and principal conductor of the Dallas Opera from 1957 to 1990. While there he conducted the U.S. debuts of such singers as Teresa Berganza, Montserrat Caballé, Plácido Domingo, Dame Gwyneth Jones, Magda Olivero, Dame Joan Sutherland, Jon Vickers, and stage director Franco Zeffirelli. He also worked with Callas in Dallas. He presented there the American premieres of Handel's Alcina and Vivaldi's Orlando furioso, the latter of which starred Marilyn Horne and was the first Vivaldi opera ever to be mounted in the United States. He also conducted the world premieres of Virgil Thomson's Fantasy in Homage to an Earlier England (1966) and Dominick Argento's The Aspern Papers (opera) (1988).

He made his debut at the Metropolitan Opera in 1978, conducting Don Pasquale (with Beverly Sills, in John Dexter's production), followed by L'elisir d'amore (1980), L'italiana in Algeri (with Marilyn Horne and Rockwell Blake, 1981), and La traviata (1981–1982). He conducted at most of the major opera houses of Italy, and made guest appearances at Glyndebourne Festival Opera, Royal Opera at Covent Garden, Opéra National de Paris, Vienna State Opera, Zurich Opera, and the Teatro Colón among other theaters.

His close association with Maria Callas, having been one of her favourite conductors, resulted in several album recordings of operatic arias made for EMI, from 1958 to 1969. He also recorded an album of Verdi arias with Robert Weede (in 1953), excerpts from Francesca da Rimini (with Mario Del Monaco and Magda Olivero, 1969), and complete sets of Tosca (with Mirella Freni, 1978) and Lucia di Lammermoor (with Edita Gruberová, 1983). Also available, on DVD, are a 1959 concert from Hamburg with Callas, and a 1981 performance of L'elisir d'amore from the Met, with Judith Blegen and Luciano Pavarotti.

Nicola Rescigno was the uncle of conductor Joseph Rescigno. He died at the age of 92 in a hospital in Viterbo, Italy, while awaiting surgery on his broken femur. He was survived by his long-term companion Aldo Marcoaldi.

== Sources ==
- Grove Music Online, Cori Ellison, June 2008.
