= Grace Panvini =

American soprano and voice teacher (1907–1999)

- Grace Panvini as Gilda in a 1942 San Carlo Opera production of Rigoletto
- Born: April 6, 1907; Manhattan, New York, U.S.
- Died: February 12, 1999 (aged 91); Lighthouse Point, Florida
- Occupations: Soprano; Voice teacher

Grazia Panvini (April 6, 1907 – February 12, 1999), also known by her married name Grace Panvini Rice, was an American soprano and voice teacher. She had an active performance career from 1931 to 1952. On stage, her career spanned from opera to musical theatre and the concert repertoire. She performed in the Broadway musicals Music in the Air (1932–1933) and Great Lady (1938), returning later to Broadway as Rosina in an English language adaption of Rossini's Il barbiere di Siviglia entitled Once Over Lightly in 1942. As a coloratura soprano, she spent several years as a leading performer with the San Carlo Opera Company, and was particularly celebrated for her performances in the roles of Rosina in The Barber of Seville and Gilda in Verdi's Rigoletto. She also appeared in operas with other American companies like the Central City Opera, and Cincinnati Opera.

After retiring from performance in 1952, Panvini and her husband, the operatic baritone Curtis Rice, worked jointly as voice teachers out of a studio in New York City during the 1950s and 1960s. In the early 1960s, they founded the non-profit organization Lyric Arts Opera Inc. which was established as a training ground for young American opera singers. This organization presented several seasons of operas in New York City with casts of developing opera singers. It remained active until 1970, when the Rices moved to South Florida. There the couple continued to teach and mentor young opera singers. The couple co-established the Young Artist Program at the Florida Grand Opera, a company Panvini had performed with during her career. Still teaching in the 1990s, she died in Lighthouse Point, Florida, in 1999 at age 91.

== Early life ==
Grazia Panvini was born on April 6, 1907, in Manhattan. She was the daughter of Paolo and Concetta Panvini. She trained as an operatic soprano primarily under Estelle Liebling, the voice teacher of Beverly Sills. In her early career she was a voice student of Vincent Nola. She also received vocal coaching from Fausto Cleva and Maurice Abravanel.

Panvini began performing in the 1930s. In 1931 she made her recital debut at the Brooklyn Academy of Music, giving a program of coloratura soprano arias which Musical Advance described as very successful. In 1932–1933 she was a member of the Endorf Walking Ensemble in the original Broadway production of Oscar Hammerstein II and Jerome Kern's Music in the Air which opened at the Alvin Theatre before transferring to the 44th Street Theatre. Kern wrote music specifically for her voice to display her skills singing high coloratura. After this production closed she began working as a singer on American radio.

== Career ==
Panvini made her opera debut as Rosina in The Barber of Seville at the Central City Opera in 1936, and was also heard that season as Casilda in Gilbert and Sullivan's The Gondoliers. In 1937 she gave a national concert tour in conjunction with baritone Conrad Mayo with stops in Pennsylvania, Maryland, Alabama, North Carolina, New Hampshire, and Maine. The singers performed a concert of opera arias and duets. After this she performed roles with the New England Opera and Cincinnati Opera.

In 1938 Panvini created the role of the Marquis in Frederick Loewe's short-lived Broadway musical Great Lady at the Majestic Theatre. That same year she performed the aria "Una voce poco fa" in concert with the Toronto Symphony Orchestra under conductor Reginald Stewart, recording the work with them for broadcast on NBC Radio. In 1939 she was a soloist in Toronto's Promenade Symphony Concerts, performing "The Bell Song" from Léo Delibes's Lakmé under the baton of Adrian Boult.

In the 1940s Panvini was a leading soprano of the San Carlo Opera Company (SCOC), a professional company that routinely toured throughout the United States. Early roles she performed with the SCOC included Micaela in Carmen (1942) and Gilda in Rigoletto (1942). A petite woman of just 4 ft 11.75 in (151.77 cm), the Washington Evening Star critic felt her short stature was a particular advantage in her portrayal of Gilda, adding credibility to the youthful appearance of the character.

In August 1942 the SCOC debuted a new version of The Barber of Seville that used contemporary American English in a new libretto by Laszlo Halasz. First performed at the theater of The Watergate Hotel in Washington D.C., the production starred Panvini as Rosina. The production moved to Broadway where it was performed under the name Once Over Lightly at the Alvin Theatre. This work was an Americanized version of The Barber of Seville that used contemporary American English in a new book by Laszlo Halasz. The work failed with New York audiences, but was a precursor to the later successful Carmen Jones which successfully adapted Bizet's Carmen a year later for Broadway. She repeated the role to sold out crowds at the Rockefeller Center's Center Theatre in May 1945.

In January 1943 Panvini began a national tour with Sigmund Romberg and his orchestra, singing Romberg tunes with the composer conducting. Panvini also sang German operetta arias on this tour. The tour made stops in West Virginia, Ohio, Texas, South Dakota, Indiana, Iowa, Mississippi, Pennsylvania, South Carolina, and Washington D.C. After the conclusion of the tour with Romberg, she joined the Columbia Opera Company of New York with whom she toured as Gilda in Rigoletto. In November 1943 she sang the title role of Donizetti's Lucia di Lammermoor at the Broadway Theatre with SCOC with Stefano Ballarini as Lord Enrico Ashton.

Panvini performed the role of Gilda again on tour with the SCOC in 1944–1945 with Carlo Morelli in the title role, Mario Palermo as the Duke of Mantua, and William Wilderman as Monterone. By April 1944 she was starring in a show entitled Cover Girl at Radio City Music Hall.

For the fall of 1945 Panvini was once again with SCOC, this time as Rosina in The Barber of Seville with Morelli as Figaro, Palermo as Almaviva, and Mario Valle as Bartolo. She sang Rosina again with SCOC in 1950, and also performed Rosina in 1947 at the Florida Grand Opera with Tito Schipa as Almaviva, Virgilio Lazzari as Don Basilio, Lloyd Harris as Bartolo, Ivy Dale as Berta, and Angelo Pilotti as Figaro.

=== Voice teacher and mentor ===
Panvini retired from performance in 1952. She then opened a voice studio in New York City with her husband, the operatic baritone Curtis Rice. In the early 1960s the couple co-founded the non-profit Lyric Arts Opera Inc. (LAOI), which was an organization dedicated to staging an annual season of operas with young American singers to help develop them towards a professional career. Several of their students were able to obtain professional contracts with companies like the New York City Opera after scouts saw them in productions staged by the LAOI. The company's final opera season was in 1970.

In 1970 Panvini and her husband left New York and moved to South Florida. There, they continued to teach and mentor young opera singers. The couple co-founded the Young Artist Program at the Florida Grand Opera, and frequently gave masterclasses to singers associated with that program into the late 1990s.

Grace Panvini Rice died at the age of 91 on February 12, 1999, in Lighthouse Point, Florida.
