= Mary Kaestner =

American opera singer

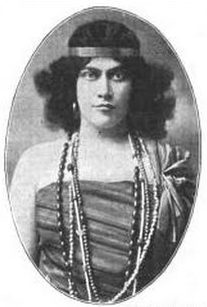
- Mary Kaestner as Aïda, from a 1917 publication
- Born: Mary Ethel Kaestner; 29 July 1882; Fairfield, Iowa
- Other names: Mary Kastner, Mary Peroni
- Occupation: Opera singer
- Years active: 1914–1917
- Known for: Three seasons with the San Carlo Opera Company
- Spouse: Carlo Peroni

Mary Ethel Kaestner Peroni (29 July 1882 – ) was an American opera singer who was a dramatic soprano with the San Carlo Opera Company.

== Early life ==
Mary Kaestner was born in Iowa to German emigrant Adolf August Kästner, a butcher from Crimmitschau, Kingdom of Saxony, and Laura Bell Dodge from Indiana. She had two brothers and two sisters. Her parents divorced in 1892 and her father moved to Santa Ana, California in 1899. She was sometimes incorrectly described as Viennese or German.

== Career ==
Kaestner was singing in Vienna when World War I began, and she returned to the United States. She toured North America with the San Carlo Opera Company for three seasons, from 1914 to 1917, singing leading roles in Aïda, Cavalleria rusticana, Lohengrin, Pagliacci, Tosca, Faust, Il trovatore, and La Gioconda. "Mary Kaestner is one of those artists who has proved at each appearance that certainty and poise are her assets," commented a reviewer in 1917. "Besides her dramatic voice of unusual beauty, her acting is brilliant and brainy."

== Personal life ==
In 1919, Mary Kaestner married Italian opera conductor Carlo Peroni, and retired from her stage career, saying "one famous person in a family is enough." She survived as his widow when Peroni died in 1944.
