= Carlo Peroni (conductor) =

Italian opera conductor

Carlo Pasquale Peroni (February 8, 1888 – March 12, 1944) was an Italian opera conductor who served as the musical director of Fortune Gallo's San Carlo Opera Company (SCOC) from 1921 until his death 23 years later. With that company he performed in almost every major city in North America, typically conducting 8 opera performance a week eight months out of the year. In 1934, upon Peroni's 500th performance with the SCOC, The New York Times declared that he had conducted more grand opera performances in North America than any conductor in history.

== Life and career ==
Peroni was born in Rome to Anacleto Peroni and Bice Arcari. He studied music at the Accademia Nazionale di Santa Cecilia. He began working as a musician and music teacher at a young age, and by the age of 13 his wages from teaching piano and harmony was the primary source of income for his family. At the age of 15 he began conducting, leading a 30 piece boys band in Rome. In 1914, he immigrated to the United States where his career was largely centered for the rest of his life. He served in the United States Navy during World War I, after which he worked as a conductor for Antonio Scotti's touring company the Scotti Opera Company from 1919 to 1921. Wilfrid Pelletier was notably his assistant at the Scotti Opera.

Peroni was admired for his photographic memory. He often conducted without a score and was said to have completely memorized the complete scores to more than 70 operas. In 1929 he conducted several arias with Giovanni Martinelli for some of the last recordings made by Edison Records. He also served as director of the Chicago Opera Company from 1941 to 1942 and continued to collaborate with that company periodically up until his death. The last performance he conducted was an SCOC performance of Donizetti's Lucia di Lammermoor at the Academy of Music in Philadelphia in February 1944. After his death in a month later in New York City at the age of 59, he was succeeded by Nicola Rescigno, who later founded the Lyric Opera of Chicago, as musical director of the SCOC.

Peroni married soprano Mary Kaestner in 1917, and she retired from her opera career. She survived him when he died in 1944 in New York City.
