= Sofia Charlebois =

American opera singer

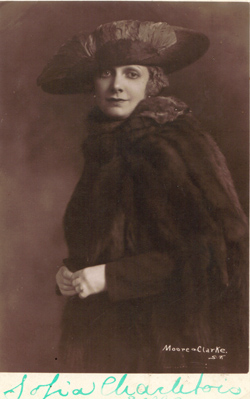
Sofia Charlebois

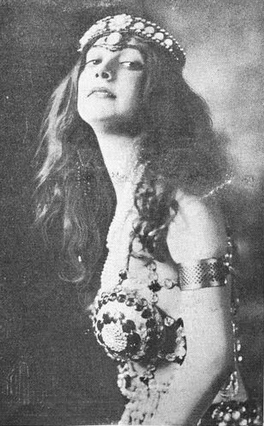
Charlebois in a heavily beaded costume, from a 1916 publication

Sofia Charlebois (May 11, 1887 – October 13, 1948), also seen as Sophie Charlebois, Sophie Charlotte Wood, and from 1912 as Sofia Charlebois Gallo, was an American lyric soprano opera singer.

== Early life ==
Sophie Charlotte Wood was born in San Francisco, California, the daughter of Charles C. Wood (also known as Charles Charlebois) and Delilah Kashow Wood. Her grandfather was Israel Kashow, who ran a fishery on Belvedere Island; he raised Sophie after both her parents died in 1892. She attended San Francisco State University, and the Frank Damrosch Conservatory in New York City.

== Career ==
Charlebois toured with the Lambardi Grand Opera Company from 1910, and with the San Carlo Grand Opera Company, sharing soprano parts in the latter company with Anna Fitziu, Marie Rappold, Tamaki Miura, Dorothy Jardon, and Josephine Lucchese. Roles she sang included Micaela in Carmen, Marguerite in Faust, Nedda in Pagliacci, Musetta in La bohème, and Giulietta in The Tales of Hoffmann. "Sophie Charlebois in the difficult but thoroughly pleasing part of Musetta made a distinct success," wrote one reviewer in 1919, adding "She is a daintly little piece of Dresden china, very attractive, and her acting very vivacious. She has a voice of pleasing quality and considerable range."

== Personal life ==
Charlebois married Italian opera impresario Fortune Gallo in 1912. She and Gallo toured together internationally with opera productions; Gallo said of Charlebois, "I am sure my wife would not have been happy had her marriage meant the sacrifice of her career as a singer." She died as a passenger aboard the ocean liner Saturnia in 1948, aged 61 years.
