= Music in the Air =

Musical by Jerome Kern and Oscar Hammerstein II

- Original Broadway Opening Night Playbill
- Music: Jerome Kern
- Lyrics: Oscar Hammerstein II
- Book: Oscar Hammerstein II
- Productions: 1932 Broadway; 1933 West End; 1934, 1937, 1944, 1951 St. Louis, Missouri; 1951 Broadway revival

Music in the Air is a musical written by Oscar Hammerstein II (lyrics and book) and Jerome Kern (music). It introduced songs such as "The Song Is You", "In Egern on the Tegern See" and "I've Told Ev'ry Little Star". The musical premiered on Broadway in 1932, and followed the team's success with the musical Show Boat from 1927.

== Productions ==
The original Broadway production opened at the Alvin Theatre on November 8, 1932, moved to the 44th Street Theatre on March 31, 1933 and closed on September 16, 1933 after 342 performances. It was directed by Jerome Kern and Oscar Hammerstein, and the cast included Reinald Werrenrath (Cornelius), Natalie Hall (Frieda Hatzfeld), Tullio Carminati (Bruno Mahler), Katherine Carrington (Sieglinde Lessing), Al Shean (Dr. Walter Lessing), Walter Slezak (Karl Reder), Nicholas Joy (Ernst Weber), and Marjorie Main (Anna). The music was orchestrated by Robert Russell Bennett. The opera singer Grace Panvini made her stage debut as a member of the ensemble in the original cast of Music in the Air.

The musical opened in the West End at His Majesty's Theatre on May 19, 1933 and ran for 199 performances. The musical was staged at The Muny outdoor musical theatre, St. Louis, Missouri, in 1934, and again in 1937, 1944 and 1951.

The 1934 film version starred Gloria Swanson, John Boles, Douglass Montgomery, June Lang, and Al Shean. The director was Joe May, and the screenplay was by Howard Irving Young and Billy Wilder. It was released by Fox Film Corporation. The 1934 film, however, omitted the show's best-known number, The Song Is You. The song was filmed, but deleted from the final print.

A 1951 Broadway revival ran from October 8, 1951 through November 24, 1951 at the Ziegfeld Theatre. Directed by Oscar Hammerstein II, the cast featured Jane Pickens, Dennis King and Charles Winninger. Because of possible anti-German feeling after World War II, Hammerstein changed the setting from Munich to Zurich with the resulting Swiss nationalities.

In 2009, Encores! at New York City Center presented a staged concert version of the show, starring Douglas Sills (Bruno Mahler), Sierra Boggess (Sieglinde Lessing), Dick Latessa (Herr Direktor Kirschner), Marni Nixon (Frau Direktor Kirschner), Ryan Silverman (Karl Reder) and Kristin Chenoweth (Frieda Hatzfeld, filling in for an originally announced Marin Mazzie). It ran from February 5 until February 8. The musical was revived at the Ohio Light Opera in July 2019.

== Principal characters ==
- Cornelius, a bird-seller
- Frieda Hatzfeld, an operetta star
- Bruno Mahler, a composer
- Sieglinde Lessing, a young singer in love with Karl
- Dr Walther Lessing, Sieglinde's father, a composer and music teacher
- Karl Reder, the local schoolteacher
- Ernst Weber, publisher
- Lili Kirschner, wife of the producer

== Synopsis ==
The musical takes place in Bavaria during the 1930s but some contemporary productions have modified it to present day.

In the simple mountain town of Edendorff in Bavaria, music teacher Dr. Walther Lessing has a beautiful daughter Sieglinde. She is in love with Karl Reder, the local schoolmaster. Karl and Sieglinde travel to the sophisticated city of Munich and try to get a song written by Walther and Karl published. Karl becomes enamored of glamorous operetta diva Frieda Hatzfeld while Sieglinde is smitten by Bruno Mahler, an operetta librettist with whom Frieda lives. Mahler wants Sieglinde to appear in his new work "Tingle-Tangle". Frieda moves out of Mahler's apartment and moves to an hotel where she can see Karl on a regular basis.

Bruno takes Sieglinde to the Munich zoo where Sieglinde is warned by Cornelius, a bird-seller, that as she and Karl are country people, it is not wise to stay in the big city. Sieglinde spurns an unwanted pass from Bruno while Frieda finds Karl equally unresponsive. Frieda plans to leave for Berlin to star in a new film. Before she leaves, she warns Karl that Bruno will cast Sieglinde aside as soon as he has used her. It is up to Karl to tell the producer of the show that Frieda has left. Bruno insists, to Karl's chagrin, that Sieglinde can take over the leading role in the operetta. Resulting from machinations of her father, and a somewhat chaotic dress rehearsal it becomes evident that Sieglinde is far too inexperienced to take on a leading role. As a result, Bruno's affections vanish. Walther and Sieglinde are told in no uncertain terms that the theatre is no place for amateurs and they should return to their home, and they do.

Frieda meanwhile has returned to take up the leading role and is an overwhelming success. Karl returns to Edendorff and to Sieglinde, both having learned a valuable lesson.

== Musical numbers ==
=== Act I ===
Leit Motif

- Prelude, Choral Song, and Inspiration - Dr. Lessing and Village Girls
- Finaletto - Dr. Lessing, Sieglinde Lessing, and Karl Reder

The Town Crier

- Interlude - Hans

Etude

- Opening Dance - Two Children
- Melodies of May/I've Told Ev'ry Little Star – Sieglinde Lessing, Karl Reder, and Choral Society
- Prayer – Karl Reder, Sieglinde Lessing and Ensemble
- There's a Hill Beyond a Hill – Hans and Walking Club

The Walking Club

- There's a Hill Beyond a Hill (Continued) – Walking Club

Pastoral

- At Stony Brook (On the Road to Munich) - Sieglinde Lessing, Karl Reder, and Cornelius

The Vogelsanger

- And Love Was Born - Cornelius

Impromptu

- Scena (I Am So Eager) - Freida Hatzfeld
- Pas Seul (Bubble Dance) - Hulde
- I've Told Ev'ry Little Star (Reprise) – Sieglinde Lessing
- Scene from Bruno's New Play "Tingle-Tangle"

Letter Song: I'm Coming Home – Bruno Mahler

Arietta: I'm Alone – Frieda Hatzfeld

Duet: I Am So Eager - Frieda Hatzfeld and Bruno Mahler

Finaletto: I Am So Eager – Bruno Mahler, Frieda Hatzfeld and Ensemble

- Terzetto: Finaletto Act I – Marthe, Ernst Weber and Dr. Walter Lessing

=== Act II ===
Sonata

- Zoo Scene - Sieglinde Lessing, Bruno Mahler, and Cornelius
- One More Dance – Bruno Mahler
- Scena/Night Flies By – Sieglinde Lessing, Bruno Mahler, Frieda Hatzfeld, and Karl Reder
- Finale to Zoo Scene: I've Told Every Little Star (Reprise) – Sieglinde Lessing

Nocturne

- I'm Alone (Reprise) – Frieda Hatzfeld

Caprice

- When the Spring Is in the Air – Sieglinde Lessing and Ensemble
- In Egern on the Tegern See – Frau Direktor Kirschner
- Finaletto - Sieglinde Lessing and Karl Reder

Dress Rehearsal

- Interlude - Stage Manager

Rhapsody

- The Song Is You – Bruno Mahler

Intermezzo

- Finaletto - Ernst, Uppman, Dr. Lessing, and Sieglinde Lessing

Humoresque

- I'm Alone (Reprise) – Frieda Hatzfeld
- The Song Is You (Reprise) – Frieda Hatzfeld and Bruno Mahler

Rondo

- Finale: The Village of Edendorf (We Belong Together) – Karl Reder, Sieglinde Lessing, Cornelius and Company
