= Rose Bampton =

American opera singer (1907–2007)

Rose Bampton

Rose Bampton (November 28, 1907 in Lakewood, Ohio – August 21, 2007 in Bryn Mawr, Pennsylvania) was an American opera singer who had an active international career during the 1930s and 1940s. She began her professional career performing mostly minor roles from the mezzo-soprano repertoire in 1929 but later switched to singing primarily leading soprano roles in 1937 until her retirement from the opera stage in 1963.

She notably had a lengthy and fruitful partnership with the Metropolitan Opera in New York City, singing there for eighteen consecutive seasons between 1932 and 1950. Her greatest successes were from the dramatic soprano repertoire, particularly in operas by Richard Wagner.

Not a stranger to the concert repertoire, Bampton was particularly known for her performances of works by Alban Berg, Arnold Schoenberg, and her friend Samuel Barber, notably having performed Barber's compositions with the composer accompanying her in concert.

== Early life and career: 1907–1932 ==
Born in Lakewood, Ohio, Bampton grew up in Buffalo, New York. She entered Drake University in Des Moines, Iowa, where she initially began training as a soprano, but was redirected by her voice teacher into the mezzo-soprano repertoire after a serious bout of laryngitis. Shortly after graduating with a bachelor's degree, Bampton made her professional opera debut as Siebel in Gounod's Faust at the Chautauqua Opera in 1929. Her performance was positively received and she was invited to perform at the Worcester Music Festival in Worcester, Massachusetts that summer.

In the fall of 1929 Bampton moved to Philadelphia after being offered a contract to join the roster of singers of the Philadelphia Grand Opera Company (PGOC) where she sang mostly comprimario roles over the next three years. Bampton made her PGOC debut as Mercédès in Georges Bizet's Carmen on October 23, 1929, with a cast that included Sophie Braslau as Carmen, Ralph Errolle as Don José, Chief Caupolican as Escamillo, and Henri Elkan conducting. Other roles with the company included Mistress Bentson in Lakmé (1929), Feodor in Boris Godunov with Georges Baklanoff in the title role (1929), Mama Lucia in Cavalleria rusticana (1929, 1931), Alisa in Lucia di Lammermoor (1930), the shepherd boy in Tosca (1930, 1932), Myrtale in Thaïs (1930, 1932), the first maid in Elektra with Charlotte Boerner as Chrysothemis (1931, 1932), Brangäne in Tristan und Isolde with Paul Althouse as Tristan (1932), Wellgunde in both Das Rheingold and Götterdämmerung (1932), and Waltraute in Die Walküre (1932).

While performing at the PGOC, Bampton entered the Curtis Institute of Music in 1930 to pursue graduate studies in singing where her voice teachers included Horatio Connell and Queena Mario. She also had the opportunity to attend masterclasses given by Lotte Lehmann. While at Curtis she developed a friendship with fellow students, composers Samuel Barber and Gian Carlo Menotti. Barber notably recruited her to sing in the New York premiere of his vocal chamber work Dover Beach in 1933. Bampton also sang several times with the Philadelphia Orchestra in the early 1930s under the baton of Leopold Stokowski. With the orchestra she notably sang the Wood-Dove in the United States premiere of Schoenberg's Gurre-Lieder (1932), was the soloist for a performance of Manuel de Falla's El amor brujo (1932), and sang the role of Kundry in a concert version of Parsifal (1933) among other performances. Bampton made several appearances at the Bethlehem Bach Festival during the early 1930s.

A recording of Bampton's performance of the Gurre-Lieder with the Philadelphia Orchestra reached the ears of Giulio Gatti-Casazza, then General Director of the Metropolitan Opera. Impressed with her performance, he contacted Bampton to come and audition for the company. She obliged and ended up being offered a Met contract. According to Opera News, Bampton initially hesitated to accept the invitation as "she had doubts as to whether her true vocal range was mezzo or soprano and was concerned about her lack of stage experience." However, she relented and made her first appearance with the company for an out of town engagement in Philadelphia on November 22, 1932, as Laura Adorno in La Gioconda with Rosa Ponselle in the title role, Giacomo Lauri-Volpi as Enzo, and Giuseppe Sturani conducting.

== The Metropolitan Opera and international success: 1932–1950 ==
Just six days after her Met debut in Philadelphia, Bampton made her first appearance at the actual Metropolitan Opera House in New York City, reprising the role of Laura. Over the next four years she sang mostly smaller role at the house: the Sandman in Hänsel und Gretel, Waltraute, Wellgunde, and the Voice from Above in Parsifal. The only two roles of more considerable size that she portrayed were, Amneris in Aida and Brangäne in Tristan und Isolde. During these years she began a romantic relationship with noted Canadian conductor and pianist Wilfrid Pelletier (1896–1982) who was a regular conductor at the Met and the husband of Queena Mario, Rose's teacher at Curtis Institute. After Pelletier divorced his wife, the couple married on May 24, 1937, and, although happily married, never had children.

By the year of her marriage, Bampton was feeling highly frustrated with her lack of good roles at the Met. She therefore decided to establish herself in the soprano repertoire, beginning with a portrayal of Leonora in Il Trovatore at the Met on May 7, 1937, with Arthur Carron as Manrico. Her Met career at the Met flourished after this point with her roles at the house over the next thirteen years including Donna Anna in Don Giovanni, Elisabeth in Tannhäuser, Elsa in Lohengrin, Kundry, and the title roles in Gluck's Alceste and Verdi's Aida among others. Her most frequent role at the house was Sieglinde in Die Walküre alongside Lauritz Melchior. In January 1940 she showed an incredible level of musical versatility when she sang performances of both Aida and Amneris within a week of each other at the Met. Her last and 112th performance at the house was as Elsa on April 17, 1950, with Set Svanholm in the title role and Fritz Stiedry conducting.

In addition to singing at the Met, Bampton sang with many other opera companies throughout the world during the 1930s and 1940s, including performances in Europe and South America. In 1936-1937 she toured Germany and Czechoslovakia in concerts. She made her debut at the Bavarian State Opera as Leonora in 1936, and that same year appeared at the Semperoper in Dresden. In 1937 she made her only appearance at the Royal Opera at Covent Garden as Amneris. That same year she began a decade-long association at the Civic Opera House in Chicago, singing first with the Chicago City Opera Company and later the Chicago Opera Company. Some of her more acclaimed portrayals in Chicago included Maddalena in Andrea Chénier, Sieglinde, and Elsa.

Between 1937 and 1939 Bampton toured England, the Netherlands, and Sweden in concerts. In June, 1939, she was in Port Elizabeth, South Africa, for the Community Concert Association. She sang at the Teatro Colón in Buenos Aires every year between 1942 and 1948, making her debut with the company as the Marschallin in Richard Strauss's Der Rosenkavalier. At the Teatro Colón she tackled several roles that she never performed anywhere else, most notably several heroines in Strauss operas (Daphne, Chrysothemis and Ariadne), Eva in Die Meistersinger, Agathe in Der Freischütz, and Countess Almaviva in Le nozze di Figaro. In 1946 she appeared in operas at the Teatro Municipal in Rio de Janeiro. In 1949 she sang two roles at the San Francisco Opera, Sieglinde and Donna Anna. In autumn 1950 she made her only appearance with the New York City Opera, singing the Marschallin.

Bampton also worked actively as a recitalist and concert performer during the 1930s and 1940s. She was a regular guest artist with the New York Philharmonic (NYP) and other orchestras. A fruitful professional association with Arturo Toscanini began in 1936, when Bampton sang in Debussy's La Damoiselle élue with the NYP, and included several broadcasts with the conductor and his NBC Symphony Orchestra. In 1944, she performed the role of Leonore for Toscanini's radio broadcast of Beethoven's opera Fidelio. Others in the cast included Jan Peerce and Eleanor Steber. The performance, originally broadcast in two parts, each on a separate week, was released years later on LP and still later on CD. It was Toscanini's first radio broadcast of a virtually complete opera - all of the music was included, but all of the dialogue (except for the spoken melodrama in the prison scene) was omitted.

== Later life and career: 1950–2007 ==
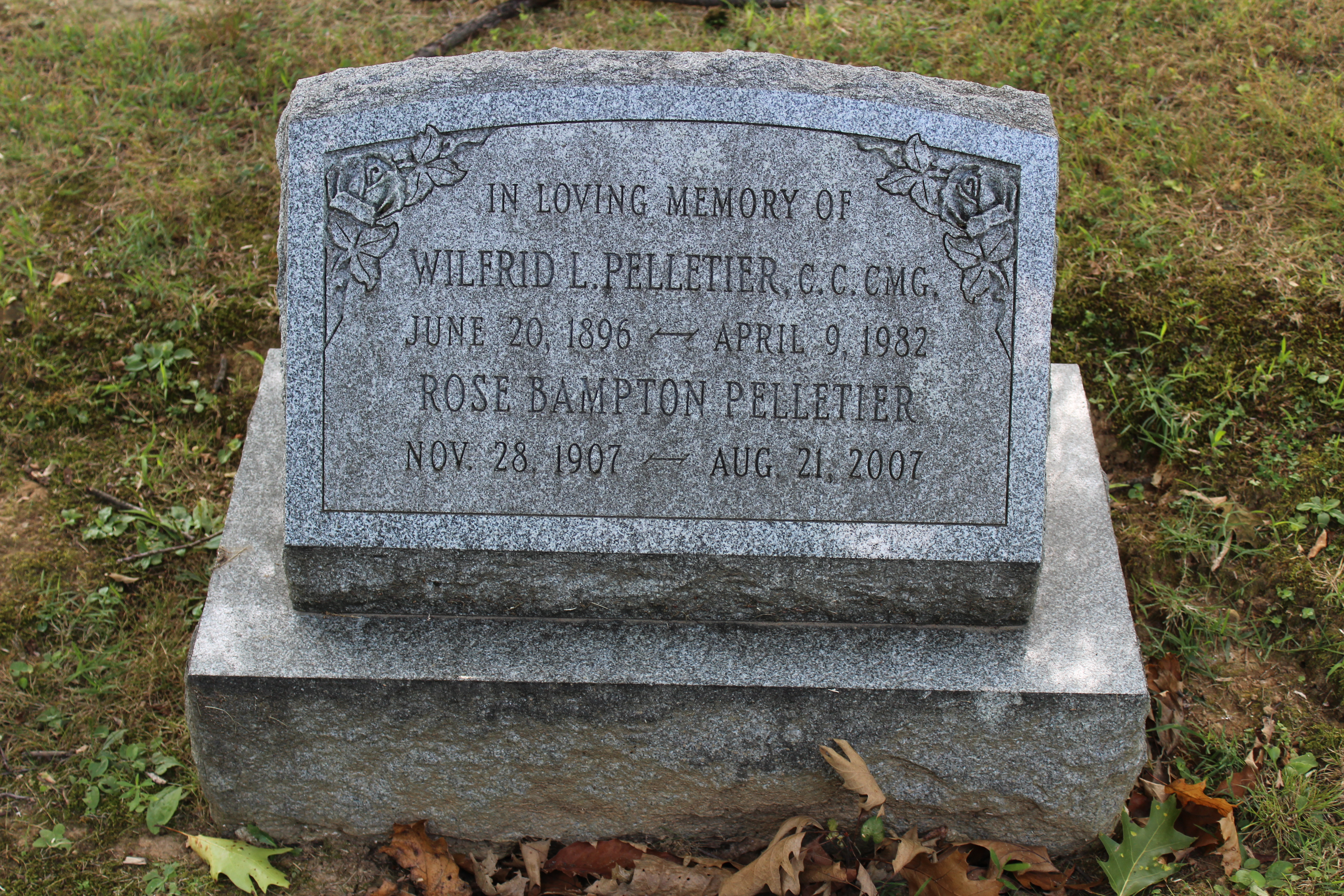
Rose Bampton Tombstone in St. David's Episcopal Church graveyard

Bampton and her husband both decided to leave the Met when Rudolf Bing was appointed the company's new general manager in 1950. Bampton stated in a 1989 interview that, "Both of us got the feeling that we wouldn't be happy with the new regime." She continued to appear in operas into the early 1960s, although her opera schedule after 1950 was sparse in comparison to the schedule she kept in the 1930s and 1940s. Bampton's last opera performance was in Dialogues of the Carmelites as Mme. de Croissy at Mount Saint Mary College in Newburgh, New York in 1963. She continued to perform sporadically in recitals and concerts into the early 1970s. Her husband died in 1982 and she never remarried.

Bampton portrayed Aunt Polly in the 1956 U.S. Steel Hour production of Frank Luther's musical version of Tom Sawyer.

After her opera career ended, Bampton embarked on a second career as a voice teacher, serving for lengthy periods on the voice faculties of Manhattan School of Music and the Juilliard School (1974–1991). She also had shorter stints on the faculties at University of North Carolina School of the Arts, Drake University and Adelphi University.

She died on August 21, 2007 and was interred at St. David's Episcopal Church in Radnor, Pennsylvania.
