= Max Rabinoff =

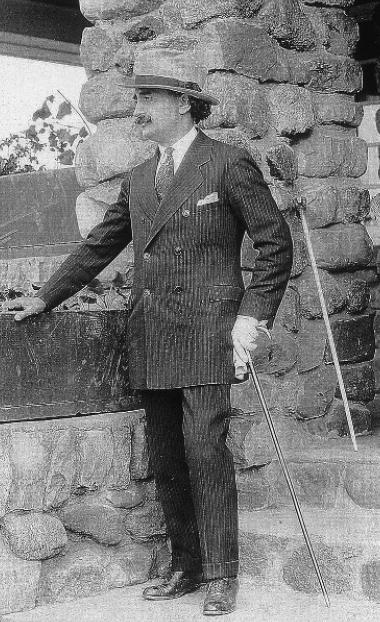
- Portrait of Max Rabinoff, impresario, wearing his trademark fedora.
- Born: Max A. Rabinoff; 9 March 1878; Mogilev, Belarus (Formerly Russian Empire)
- Died: 19 April 1966 (aged 88); New York City, U.S.
- Occupations: Opera and ballet impresario, and international economic adviser

Max A. Rabinoff (March 9, 1877 – April 19, 1966) was a Russian-born, naturalized American opera and ballet impresario and international economic adviser. By the time he had become a naturalized U.S. citizen in 1898 he had already started an international import-export company focusing on encouraging American-Russian commerce. By 1908 he had entered the world of performing arts promotion, helping to organize the Chicago Philharmonic Orchestra and the Chicago Opera Company. He is best known for founding the Boston Grand Opera Company in 1914, where he introduced American audiences to Russian ballerina Anna Pavlova and her Russian Ballet Company during his time as managing director from 1914 to 1917. He also discovered, and soon married, singer Marie La Salle, who died less than two years after their marriage.

From 1914 to 1917 he was the managing director of the Boston Opera Company featuring Anna Pavlova and her Russian Ballet Company.

Continuing his interest in promoting commerce between the United States and Eastern Bloc countries, he attended the Paris Economic Conference of 1916 where he was made economic advisor to the Republics of Estonia, Georgia, and Azerbaijan. He also attended the Genoa Conference of 1922, serving as a liaison between the Russians and Americans, and helped develop the Export-Import Bank of the United States.

Max Rabinoff died on April 19, 1966, in New York City.
