= Val Atkinson =

Australian theatrical and musical producer

Valdemar Atkinson (1 May 1894 – 8 February 1982), invariably referred to as "Val", was an Australian theatrical producer. The youngest son of a prosperous farmer, he did much to foster amateur theatricals in Sydney and regional New South Wales. He was closely associated with J. C. Williamson's and toured amateur or semi-professional companies through regional Victoria and New South Wales, also to New Zealand. He became a producer of stage shows for the Mudgee Musical Society in the early 1920s, and developed a reputation for nurturing talent and producing successful shows, both financially and artistically. He also had some successes as a comic actor and recitalist.

== History ==
Atkinson was the third son of Louisa J. Atkinson, née O'Neil, and grazier James Roland Atkinson (1861 – c. 16 March 1945) of Galambine and Cullenbone, near Mudgee, New South Wales, later "The Braes", Manilla, New South Wales, then "Manaroo", near Cooma, from 1936. The land at Galambine was settled by J. R. Atkinson's father, James Atkinson, around 1850. J. R. Atkinson was a leading citizen of the area, a prominent member of the Pastoral Protection Board, racing club and local government as well as a successful sheep grazier, wheatgrower and horse breeder. Louisa was a daughter of the Mudgee postmaster, William D. O'Neil, who in 1888 married a sister of J. R. Atkinson.

Atkinson attended Mudgee Grammar School, but unlike his brothers Eric and Geoffrey, did not distinguish himself in the classroom or sports field, but rated a mention for reciting selections from Ivry, one of Macaulay's Lays of Ancient Rome, at the 1907 prizegiving. F. T. Miller, the proprietor and headmaster, died of influenza the following January and the school was taken over briefly by J. Wheatcroft, then closed.

He was a member of the Army Cadets in 1911 when he was chosen as a representative of Mudgee to the Coronation of George V.

Atkinson described himself as a farmer when he enlisted with the First AIF in July 1915 and was sent overseas as a private, was wounded twice, promoted to corporal, and returned in 1919 to Australia, where he was awarded the Military Medal. His brothers Eric and Geoffrey Neil Atkinson also volunteered. He became an agent for the Citizens and Graziers Life Assurance Company, and set up an office for the company in Mudgee.

By 1926 he was living at Queen Street, Melbourne. and was founding director of the Melbourne School of Opera and Musical Comedy, with Judy Littleton, ballet-mistress, in October 1926 but ceased advertising that December.

He was producer for some Gilbert and Sullivan opera in Auckland, New Zealand before Florence Sutherland left for Australia.

He helped found a musical comedy company in Geelong in 1929.

=== As producer ===
- San Toy in March 1924, by the Mudgee Operatic Society, and played at the Mudgee Town Hall, to general acclaim. Following its success, the Mudgee Musical Society was formed in April 1924, with subscribers entitled to two tickets to each performance.
- A pantomime Cinderella, which he wrote, using some imported artists as well as local talent. Played 31 October and 1 November 1924, it was well received.
- Planquette's Rip Van Winkle by the Victorian Opera Company (VOC) at the Melbourne Playhouse in September 1925. It was broadcast from King's Theatre, Melbourne over 3LO in October.
- San Toy again, in July 1926 for the VOC at the Playhouse, with choreography by Minnie Everett.
- The Geisha by the VOC at the Playhouse 11–22 December 1926. The cast included Alice Mallon.
- The Alarm Clock (adapted from La Sonnette d'alarme by Maurice Hennequin and Romain Coolus by Avery Hopwood) was produced by Atkinson and Bernard A. Colman at His Majesty's Theatre, Geelong from 12 February 1927 and the Prince of Wales Theatre, Adelaide from 19 February to 5 March 1927. The cast included soprano Alice Mallon, who had recently quit a promising career with J. C. Williamson's Gilbert and Sullivan Company.
- Florodora with Mason Wood for the VOC 8–12 August 1927 at the Theatre Royal.
- The Quaker Girl for the VOC 7–13 July 1928 at His Majesty's Theatre
- A revue, The Glad Eyedlers, for the VOC on 17 November 1928 at the Geelong Mechanics' Institute
- Concert in recognition of Wilfrid Molony's work as conductor of St Anne's Choir, Bondi Beach, followed by
- Trial by Jury for St Anne's Choir, Bondi Beach 25 March 1931 at the Masonic Hall, Bondi.
- He was co-director, with Barry J. Young, of The Sun's Silver Reel beauty contest, which attracted 80,000 people to Bondi beach on 12 December 1931.
- Cobar Revels revue in aid of the unemployed, at the Masonic Hall, Dubbo 14 April 1932. A close working relationship with the Cobar Musical Society followed.
- Three Wonderful Liars for the Bourke Comedy Company at the Wonderland Theatre, Bourke, 4 & 8 July 1932 (Diggers' Race Week)
- The Student Prince for the newly-formed Broken Hill Operatic Society at the Crystal Theatre, Broken Hill 26–30 November 1932 He followed up this success with a variety show, local productions of San Toy, Kathleen Aroon, The Girls of Gottenberg, Florodora, Oh, What a Family, Father McEvoy's The Little Flower by the Cathedral Players, founded by Dr T. M. Fox, Bishop of Wilcannia–Forbes
- In 1934 he joined the Stan Foley Revue Company as touring manager, for their presentations Hot Spots, A to Z, and Explosions at the Town Hall, Mildura 12–17 November 1934,
- Love Wins Through, an Australian musical by Adrian Ross and C. B. Fernald, with music by Howard Carr performed by Regal Operatic Society at the Sydney Conservatorium, 23–28 September 1935.
- A Runaway Girl for the students of Madame Ada Baker at the Railway and Tramway Institute on
- Trial by Jury for the Broken Hill company in 1941 on the occasion of a visit by Archbishop Gilroy. followed by

- Another pantomime Cinderella, which he also wrote, for Broken Hill children

=== The Country Girl ===
- He produced the musical A Country Girl many times, (Note: One article claimed the incredible number of 56, possibly meaning 56 nights.) notably:

- For the Mudgee Musical Society, in August 1924. A review of the production was unstinting in its praise for Atkinson's work, noting that he was paid for his services to the (voluntary) society.
- Shepparton Choral Society in July 1926
- In March 1930 for the newly-formed Bondi-Waverley Operatic Society which played at the Paddington Town Hall to full houses and excellent reviews.

=== As actor ===
Atkinson played in

- The Green Goddess as the captain of the Rajah's troops at the Criterion Theatre, Sydney in 1924.
- John Golden's play Thank U followed at the Athenaeum Theatre with Atkinson as Leonard Higginbotham.
- Noël Coward's The Young Idea with the Theatre Association of Victoria at the Palace.
- Ernest Denny's Vanity with the Theatre Association of Victoria
- He had a part in the 1937 film The Avenger.

=== Later years ===
Atkinson was associated with the Theatrical Sub-branch of the RSSILA, and its president in 1939.

He organised a talent quest at Broken Hill which generated little interest. He had previously been mentioned as likely to settle in the town, but that and a planned second talent quest never eventuated and he returned to Sydney.

In 1946 he organised a gala concert at Bondi Beach, which was a financial failure through spectators seating themselves outside the roped-off area and declining to contribute, and he retired from public life.

In 1949 Atkinson married Clare Jean Maunder (1911–1993). They lived in Tamworth where he died on 8 February 1982 and was buried in the local cemetery.
