= Bruno Bartoletti =

Italian operatic conductor (1926-2013)

- Bruno Bartoletti (photo with 1959 dedication)
- Occupation: conductor

Bruno Bartoletti (Sesto Fiorentino, 10 June 1926 – Florence, 9 June 2013) was an Italian operatic conductor. His active international career lasted from 1953 to 2007, and he specialized in the Italian repertory and contemporary works. He was particularly noted for his 51-year association with Lyric Opera of Chicago, as co-artistic director, artistic director, principal conductor, and artistic director emeritus. He also served as Artistic Director of both the Teatro dell'Opera di Roma (1965–1973) and the Maggio Musicale Fiorentino (1985–1991), and as principal conductor of the Danish Royal Opera (1957–1960), in addition to frequent work as a guest conductor at various major opera houses.

== Life and career ==
Bartoletti's father was Umberto Bartoletti, a blacksmith, who also played clarinet in a Florence band. As a youth, Bartoletti played the piccolo. A teacher in Florence recognised the young Bartoletti's talent in music, and her husband, the sculptor Antonio Berti, recommended him to the Cherubini Conservatory. There, he studied flute and piano.

Bartoletti later played in the orchestra of the Maggio Musicale Fiorentino, and subsequently became a staff pianist with the Teatro Comunale Florence, at its centre of vocal training. He was an assistant to such conductors as Artur Rodzinski, Dimitri Mitropoulos, Vittorio Gui and Tullio Serafin. In particular, Serafin encouraged Bartoletti to study conducting. In December 1953, Bartoletti made his professional conducting debut at the Teatro Comunale with Rigoletto. In 1957, he became resident conductor of the Maggio Musicale Fiorentino, where his work included conducting the Italian premiere of Shostakovich's The Nose. Subsequently, Bartoletti was artistic director of the Rome Opera from 1965 to 1973. He returned to the Maggio Musicale Fiorentino as its artistic director from 1985 to 1991. Elsewhere in Europe, Bartoletti served as principal conductor of the Royal Danish Opera from 1957 to 1960.

Bartoletti made his US conducting debut with Lyric Opera of Chicago in 1956, conducting Il trovatore, as a replacement for the indisposed Serafin. In 1964, Bartoletti was named co-artistic director of Lyric Opera, alongside Pino Donati, and served jointly with Donati until 1974. In 1975, Bartoletti became sole artistic director, and held the post until his retirement in 1999. Following his retirement, he had the title of artistic director emeritus for the remainder of his life. Bartoletti began as Lyric Opera's principal conductor in 1964, and served in that capacity until 1999. Over the period from 1956 to 2007, Bartoletti conducted approximately 600 performances of 55 operas with Lyric Opera, with his final conducting appearance at Lyric Opera in a 2007 production of La traviata. His other notable conducting work at Lyric Opera included conducting the US premiere of Britten's Billy Budd in 1970, and the 1978 world premiere of Krzysztof Penderecki's Paradise Lost.

Bartoletti focused almost exclusively on opera in his career, with few conducting engagements in symphonic work. He conducted several world premieres of works by composers such as Luciano Berio, Luigi Dallapiccola, Paul Dessau, Lodovico Rocca, Gian Francesco Malipiero, and Alberto Ginastera (Don Rodrigo, 1964). His commercial recordings Ponchielli's La Gioconda, Puccini's Manon Lescaut, and La Cena delle Beffe of Umberto Giordano (from the Opernhaus, Zürich, in 1996), as well as DVDs of Death in Venice, La bohème, Giovanna d’Arco, Macbeth, La gazza ladra, and television films of La sonnambula and Tosca.

The Italian government had bestowed on Bartoletti the rank of Cavaliere di Gran Croce della Repubblica Italiana. He was also a member of the Accademia di Santa Cecilia, and a winner of the Abbiati Prize. In his later years, Bartoletti taught at the Accademia Chigiana in Siena. His final operatic performance was a production of Manon Lescaut in February 2011.

Bartoletti was married to the former Rosanna Sandretti, an elementary-school teacher, from 1 July 1953 until her death on 2 August 2011.

== Sources ==
- Dictionnaire des interprètes, Alain Pâris, Éditions Robert Laffont, 1989.

Preceded by Pino Donati (Artistic Director 1958-1975)	Artistic Director & Principal Conductor, Lyric Opera of Chicago; 1964–1999	Succeeded by Andrew Davis (music director)
