= Alice Mallon =

Australian singer

Alice Mary Mallon (1900–1992) was an Australian soprano.

== History ==
Mallon was born in Perth, Western Australia, the only child of Eugene Michael "Euie" Mallon (died 22 November 1952) and Mary Frances Mallon, née Parsons (died 27 December 1943). In 1911 the family moved to Adelaide, and Alice Mallon was educated at St Dominic's Priory, North Adelaide, where she studied music, passing the Trinity College senior division pianoforte examination with honours in 1918, followed by studies at the Elder Conservatorium. Her singing at the 1921 Students' Concert was praised. The family were strong Catholics, and she could regularly be heard performing sacred works at St Laurence's church, North Adelaide and at private weddings and other ceremonies. A recital she gave at the Calaroga Hall, North Adelaide in 1924, was well received. In 1925 she was sponsored by J. C. Williamson's to a year's study at Melbourne's Albert Street Conservatorium, of which Dame Nellie Melba was head teacher. She took part in the Melba Conservatorium Opera Society's production of Mozart's opera The Magic Flute, September 30 and October 1–3, 1925, its first Australian stage production.

The following year it was announced that she had been selected to join Williamson's Opera Company for their Gilbert and Sullivan opera season, being produced by Minnie Everett. She was however not included in the Gilbert and Sullivan troupe, and instead played Eurydice in Gluck's Orfeo ed Euridice at The Playhouse. She appeared in Val Atkinson's production of The Geisha by the Victorian Opera Company at the Playhouse 11–22 December 1926. She was selected by Atkinson and Bernard A. Colman to appear in a comedy The Alarm Clock (adapted from La Sonnette d'alarme by Maurice Hennequin and Romain Coolus by Avery Hopwood), which had its Australian premiere in Geelong, then ran in Adelaide from 19 February to 5 March 1927. Mallon remained in Adelaide for a few months, fulfilling broadcasting and social (especially Catholic) commitments, and by November was back in Melbourne, where she was in demand for society functions and broadcasting, regularly on 3LO and 3AR 1927–28. (Note: In the days before high-quality magnetic tape, live broadcasts were the norm; often relayed to regional stations and interstate, but broadcast-quality line rental was costly, and often programmes were distributed around the country on 16-inch shellac transcription discs, which were "cut" direct from the microphone, and with care could be replayed many times.) The Alarm Clock played in Melbourne from 24 December 1927 but Mallon was not in the cast. She returned to The Playhouse in November to play Despina in Mozart's Così fan tutte.

From January to March and most of April 1929 she avoided public appearances, then partnered Enrico Palmetto "The Danish Caruso" (1876-1943), in concerts and radio appearances in Melbourne and Adelaide, returned to Melbourne to fulfil an engagement, then back to Adelaide's Theatre Royal in December. By February 1930 she was in Perth, broadcasting for 6WF.

In the 1930s she gave many concerts at the Karrakatta Club Hall, and from late 1931 appeared regularly on 6WF, an ABC station, and appeared as featured soloist in concerts by the Perth Symphony and the Metropolitan Symphony Orchestras. In November 1938 she was featured soloist with the Perth Symphony Orchestra under guest conductor Dr Malcolm Sargent, considered a singular honor. and in December was a soloist at the 80-voice Perth Philharmonic Society's production of Handel's Messiah at the Wesley Church, along with Ida Geddes, David Lyle and Frank L. Robertson. In March 1939 she and Perth baritone Alan Gamble sang a brace of songs by Albert Mallinson, accompanied on the piano by the composer himself. The program was broadcast over two evenings. By 1940 work for the ABC, which had paid well, had largely dried up, with only a few appearances on sister-station 6WN.

== Family ==
Mallon married Dr William Muir (born c. 1900) in Melbourne in 1929, but kept it a secret as Muir's family was strongly anti-Catholic. The couple moved to Western Australia in 1930, living in Perth, then from 1932 to 1934 at Esperance. Dr Muir was a valued member of the staff at Esperance Hospital, but his sudden and unannounced departure rankled. In June 1934 he took over the practice of Dr Arthur H. Gibson at 59 Market Street and 214 Canning Road, East Fremantle. He later also served as the port's Quarantine Officer.

They had three sons:

- Robert Muir (May 1933 – 2007) had a variety of occupations, but was best known as bookseller, antiquarian and historian. Robert Muir junior took over his father's bookselling business, Muir Books in Perth.
- William Muir, jun.
- Ian Campbell Muir (born 15 July 1938)

From 1935 to 1951 they lived at "Roraima", 60 Preston Point Road, East Fremantle, owned by Azelia Helena Ley née Manning (died 31 July 1954), widow of John Morgan Ley (died 13 October 1927).

According to one reference, William and Alice separated and Alice brought up the boys on her own, supplementing her radio appearance fees by taking in students for singing tuition. No references have been found to Dr William Muir after 1948, but a person of that name died in a car crash near Gordon, Victoria in November 1962.
