= Dorothy Kirsten =

American opera singer (1910–1992)

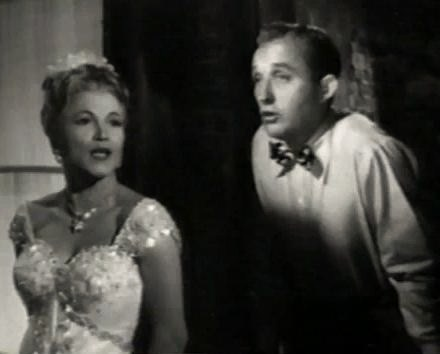
- Dorothy Kirsten with Bing Crosby
- Born: July 6, 1910; Montclair, New Jersey, U.S.
- Died: November 18, 1992 (aged 82); Los Angeles, California, U.S.
- Other name: Dorothy Kirsten French
- Occupation: Operatic soprano
- Spouses: Edward MacKayes Oates (m. 1943; div. 1949); Eugene R. Chapman, MD (m. 1951; death 1954); John "Jack" Douglas French, MD (m. 1955; death 1989)

Dorothy Kirsten (July 6, 1910, Montclair, New Jersey – November 18, 1992, Los Angeles, California) was an American operatic soprano who was the first singer in the Metropolitan Opera's history to perform on that stage for 30 consecutive years, and the first opera star to appear on the cover of Life magazine. In addition, she was the founder of the John Douglas French Alzheimer's Foundation, named in honor of her husband, John "Jack" Douglas French, MD, who died from Alzheimer's disease in 1989.

== Early life ==
Kirsten was born in Montclair, N.J., and as a child she studied piano. Her mother was an organist and music teacher, her grandfather was a conductor, and her great-aunt, Catherine Hayes, was also an opera singer. She left high school at age 16 and worked for the Singer Corporation sewing machine company and for New Jersey Bell, studying voice in her spare time. Her teacher, Louis Darnay, eventually employed her as a secretary and maid.

== Career ==
By the late 1930s she had an ongoing professional career as a radio singer on WINS, a member of the Kate Smith Chorus, and as a vocalist for pop orchestras. She mentored under Grace Moore from 1938, who had her study in Rome with Astolfo Pescia. Her time in Europe was cut by the outbreak of World War II, and she returned in 1939, debuting at the New York World's Fair. Roles followed at the Chicago Opera Company (Manon, 1940), San Carlo Opera Company (1942), New York City Opera (1943), San Francisco Opera (1945), and New York Philharmonic (1945). Her radio program "Keepsakes" ran for a year in 1943–44.

Kirsten joined the roster of principal sopranos at the Philadelphia La Scala Opera Company (PLSOC) in 1943 and spent much of her time performing there through 1947. She made her debut with the company in an out-of-town performance at the Syria Mosque in Pittsburgh on May 18, 1943 as Mimì in Giacomo Puccini's La bohème with Nino Martini as Rodolfo, Carlo Morelli as Marcello, and Armand Balendonck conducting.

In the 1943–1944 PLSOC season at the Academy of Music she portrayed Mimì many times and sang Nedda in Pagliacci with Giovanni Martinelli as Canio. She also toured with the company to Detroit in October 1943, singing Mimì to Armand Tokatyan's Rodolfo. Kirsten opened the PLSOC's 1944–1945 season singing Micaëla in Georges Bizet's Carmen with Bruna Castagna in the title role. She also toured with company to Cleveland singing Mimì.

In February 1946 she traveled with PLSOC to Washington D.C. to perform Marguerite in Charles Gounod's Faust. In December 1949 she recorded Manon Lescaut with the tenor Jussi Björling. Her final year performing with the PLSOC was the 1946–1947 season, portraying Cio-cio-san in Madama Butterfly and Juliette in Roméo et Juliette.

Kirsten debuted at the Metropolitan Opera with the role of Mimi in La bohème on December 1, 1945, and continued to sing with the Met for the next thirty years. While she performed primarily in the United States, she did perform in Europe at times, and gave performances in the USSR in 1962, singing Violetta in La traviata at the Bolshoi Opera. She sang in the American premieres of William Walton's Troilus and Cressida and Francis Poulenc's Dialogues of the Carmelites in San Francisco. Her last performance with the Met was on February 10, 1979 as the title role in Tosca.

In addition to her operatic activities, she sang on radio with Frank Sinatra (co-starring with him in Light-Up Time), Bing Crosby, Nelson Eddy, Jack Benny, Gordon MacRae, and Perry Como. She also appeared in two films, Mr. Music (1950) and The Great Caruso (1951). In 1965, she appeared on the Firestone album series Your Favorite Christmas Music, Volume 4, singing "I Wonder as I Wander" and "Joy to the World".

== John Douglas French Alzheimer's Foundation ==
In 1982, Kirsten's husband, John "Jack" Douglas French, MD, a neurosurgeon who co-founded and served as the first director of the UCLA Brain Research Institute, was diagnosed with Alzheimer's disease. Kirsten ended her operatic career, and spent the rest of her life working to find a cure for her husband's degenerative brain disorder.

In 1983, Kirsten founded the John Douglas French Alzheimer's Foundation, named in honor of her husband, with a goal to raise money for a disease that affects approximately 5.8 million Americans. Kirsten and the French Foundation raised money for and built the first residential facility for Alzheimer's patients in the United States, which opened in 1987. Dr. French, Kirsten's husband, died at the John Douglas French Center for Alzheimer's Disease in 1989.

In 2020, the John Douglas French Alzheimer's Foundation established an endowed neurology chair at the David Geffen School of Medicine at UCLA.

== Personal ==
Kirsten French was married three times. Her first marriage was to Edward MacKayes Oates, a radio executive, with a divorce in 1949. She married Dr. Eugene Chapman, the assistant dean of the UCLA Medical School, in 1951, who died three years later. In 1955, she married John "Jack" Douglas French, MD, a neurosurgeon, who died in 1989.

Kirsten French suffered a stroke on November 5, 1992 and died of complications on November 18, 1992. She is interred at Forest Lawn Memorial Park in Glendale, California, and is survived by two sisters, Ethel Anderson and Eleanor Parker, and a brother, George Kirsten. Her papers are housed at the Howard Gotlieb Archival Research Center at Boston University.

== Filmography ==
Year	Title	Role	Notes
1929	Happy Days	Chorus Woman	
1950	Mr. Music	Dorothy Kirsten	
1951	The Great Caruso	Louise Heggar	

== Publications ==
- Kirsten, Dorothy (1982). A Time To Sing (Doubleday). ISBN 0385147449
