= Pino Donati =

Italian composer

Pino Donati (9 May 1907 – 24 February 1975) was an Italian composer and for many years artistic director of the Chicago Lyric Opera.

Donati was born in Verona. From 1936 he was superintendent of the Arena di Verona and then from 1950 the Teatro Comunale of Bologna. In 1958 he left Italy for Chicago to work for Carol Fox and remained employed there till his death in Rome at the age of 67. His wife, who survived him, was the soprano Maria Caniglia.

== Works, editions, recordings ==
- theatre music for the play Fiorenza by Sem Benelli
- chamber music – Pastorale della trincea 1933
- Hungaria for choir and orchestra

Operas

- Corradino lo svevo on the life of Conradin the Swabian, to a libretto by the Veronese writer Arturo Rossato (1882–1942) – premiere Verona 1931.
- Lancillotto del Lago, premiere Bergamo 1938
