= Lyric Opera of Chicago =

American nonprofit organization

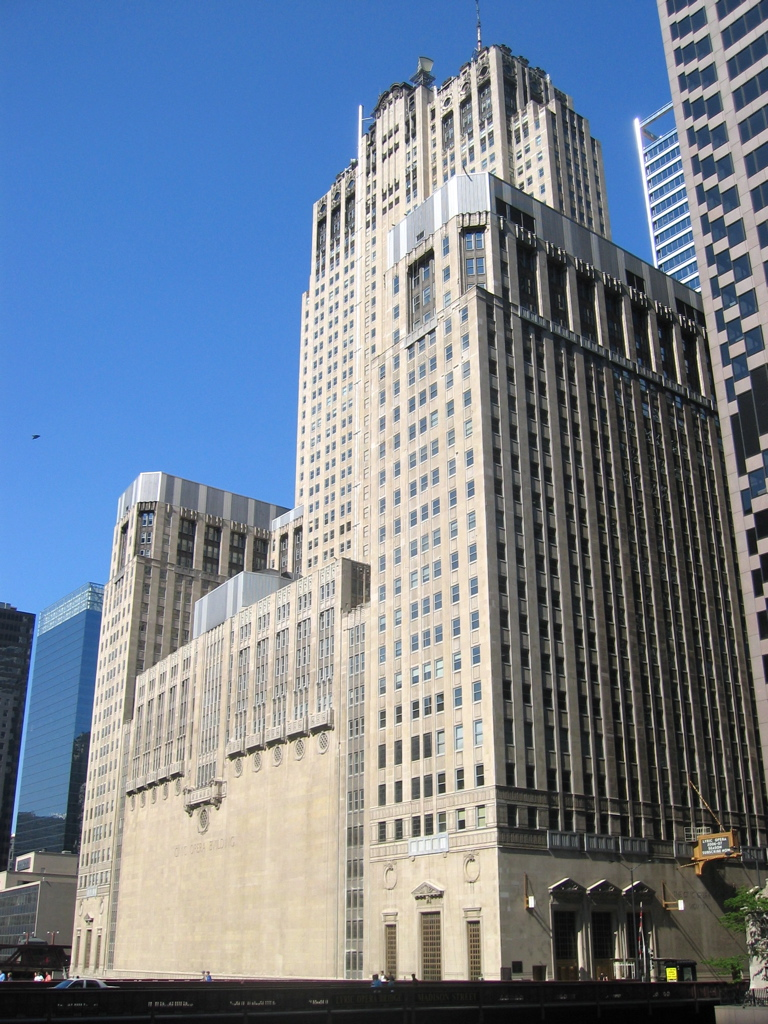
Exterior of the Civic Opera Building, which contains within it theaters and related space for the opera, as well as an office building

The Lyric Opera of Chicago is an American opera company based in Chicago, Illinois. The company was founded in Chicago in 1954, under the name 'Lyric Theatre of Chicago' by Carol Fox, Nicola Rescigno and Lawrence Kelly, with a season that included Maria Callas's American debut in Norma. Fox re-organized the company in 1956 under its present name. Lyric is housed in a theater and related spaces in the Civic Opera Building. These spaces are now owned by Lyric.

== Opera in Chicago, 1850–1954 ==
The first opera to be performed in Chicago was Bellini's La sonnambula, presented by a traveling opera company on 29 July 1850. Chicago's first opera house opened in 1865 but was destroyed in the Great Fire of Chicago in 1871. The second opera house, the Chicago Auditorium, opened in 1889.

In 1929, the current Civic Opera House on 20 North Wacker Drive was opened, though the Chicago Civic Opera Company itself collapsed in the Great Depression. The old Auditorium continued to produce stage shows and musicals until it closed in 1941.

Resident opera companies began in Chicago in 1910 with the Chicago Grand Opera Company being formed from the remains of the Manhattan Opera Company, which had been founded by Oscar Hammerstein I, and had been squeezed out by the more financially sound Metropolitan Opera. Chicago had this first company for four seasons, then, after no season in 1914/15, it was re-formed as the Chicago Opera Association. This lasted through 1921/22, when it became the Chicago Civic Opera from 1922 until 1932. After no season in 1932/33, the company was re-formed and again named the Chicago Grand Opera Company from 1933 to 1935. From 1936 to 1939, the company was called Chicago City Opera Company, and finally from 1940 to 1946 opera was presented by the Chicago Opera Company. There were no seasons from 1947 until 1953, so opera was presented by other companies on tour. Lyric Opera of Chicago was formed in 1954 and has continued uninterrupted except for 1967.

== Lyric Opera, 1954 to 1980 ==
Carol Fox, America's first female opera impresario at the age of 28, began her first season in 1954 by bringing Maria Callas for her American debut in the title role of Norma, the first of many electrifying Callas performances in Chicago. However, this first eight-opera season in 1954 was not the result of a long apprenticeship in opera production; Carol Fox, fluent in Italian and French, had studied opera singing for many years, culminating in two years of intensive work in Italy. However, when she realized that performance was not to be in her future, she decided that it lay in bringing the performances of the world's finest artists to her home town of Chicago. Her success can be measured in one statistic regarding the filling of Lyric's Civic Opera House: in 1954, the season ran for three weeks; in 2007/08 Lyric had an almost six-month season.

Fox also used her formidable persuasive powers on artists other than singers: she was able to bring Rudolf Nureyev to make his debut on an American opera stage at Lyric; Vera Zorina, Alicia Markova, Erik Bruhn and Maria Tallchief also danced at Lyric, and George Balanchine created choreography for Lyric. The Italian composer Pino Donati was her artistic director. Bruno Bartoletti was principal conductor, but other conductors included Tullio Serafin, Dimitri Mitropoulos and Artur Rodziński. Christoph von Dohnányi and Sir Georg Solti chose Lyric for their American operatic debuts. Franco Zeffirelli staged operas as did Harold Prince. After retiring from dancing, Tallchief moved to Chicago where she served as director of ballet for Lyric from 1973 to 1979. In 1974, she founded Lyric Opera's ballet school, where she taught the Balanchine technique.

Because of Fox's illnesses and her refusal to lower her artistic standards despite Lyric's dire financial state in 1980, her resignation was sought and given. She died a few months later, survived by a daughter, Victoria.

It was of Lyric's founder that Saul Bellow wrote in 1979 "Miss Fox will be remembered, together with Jane Addams of Hull House and Harriet Monroe of Poetry magazine, as one of Chicago's greatest women."

Throughout the many years at Lyric, Carol Fox developed the confidence and authority to bring world-famous artists to Lyric: Luciano Pavarotti (56 performances in 7 roles), Tito Gobbi, Eleanor Steber, Jussi Björling, Birgit Nilsson, Renata Tebaldi, Giuseppe Di Stefano, Giulietta Simionato, Richard Tucker, Boris Christoff, Eileen Farrell, Dorothy Kirsten, Leonie Rysanek, Leontyne Price, Elisabeth Schwarzkopf, Geraint Evans, Mirella Freni, Nicolai Ghiaurov, Alfredo Kraus, Renata Scotto, Robert Merrill, Joan Sutherland, Christa Ludwig, Jon Vickers, Marilyn Horne, Grace Bumbry, Montserrat Caballé, Tatiana Troyanos, Sherrill Milnes, Plácido Domingo, Felicia Weathers, Vyacheslav Polozov and José Carreras. Anna Moffo also chose Lyric for her American debut.

== Later administrations ==
Fox was succeeded at Lyric by her longtime assistant manager, Ardis Krainik (1981–1996), after whom the main auditorium inside the opera house was later named, and then by William Mason (1997–2011).

From 1964 to 1974, Bruno Bartoletti, served as co-artistic director and principal conductor, and became sole director and principal from 1974 to 2000. Sir Andrew Davis was Lyric's music director and principal conductor, a post he occupied beginning in September 2000. Davis retired in June 2021 and passed the baton to Enrique Mazzola, Lyric Opera's current music director and principal conductor.

Danny Newman was the company's long-time press agent from 1954 until his retirement in the 2001-2002 season. Newman is largely credited as the founder of subscription-based arts marketing, the standard economic model for not-for-profit arts organizations in the US. Philip David Morehead was head of music staff until his retirement in 2015.

Anthony Freud became general director of the company in October 2011. In September 2020, Lyric announced the election of Sylvia Neil as chair of Lyric’s board of directors, the first woman board chair in Lyric’s history. In December 2021, Freud's contract was extended through 2026. However, Freud concluded his tenure with the company at the close of the 2023-2024 season, two seasons earlier than the previously announced extension of his most recent contract. In July 2024, the company announced the appointment of John Mangum as its next general director, effective with the autumn of 2024.

== Production history ==
In addition to the standard operatic repertoire, Lyric also presents contemporary works. Recent productions have included Harbison's The Great Gatsby (2000–2001), Weill's Street Scene (2001–2002), Floyd's Susannah, Sondheim's Sweeney Todd (2002–2003), and John Adams' Doctor Atomic directed by Peter Sellars.

Composer William Bolcom wrote his most recent opera for Lyric, A Wedding, based on the 1978 film of the same name directed by Robert Altman. It premiered during Lyric's 50th-anniversary season. During the 2015/16 season, the company premiered its latest commission, Bel Canto by Peruvian composer Jimmy López with a libretto by Nilo Cruz based on the novel by Ann Patchett.

Lyric's productions were broadcast and nationally syndicated by WFMT Radio Network, from 1971 until 2001. The broadcasts ceased then because of a loss of sponsorship. The issue was resolved at the 11th hour for the October 21, 2006 premiere of Richard Strauss's opera Salome starring Deborah Voigt. Syndicated broadcast of Lyric resumed in May 2007 on the WFMT network, which was included on XM Satellite Radio before it merged and became SiriusXM Radio.

== Civic Opera House ==
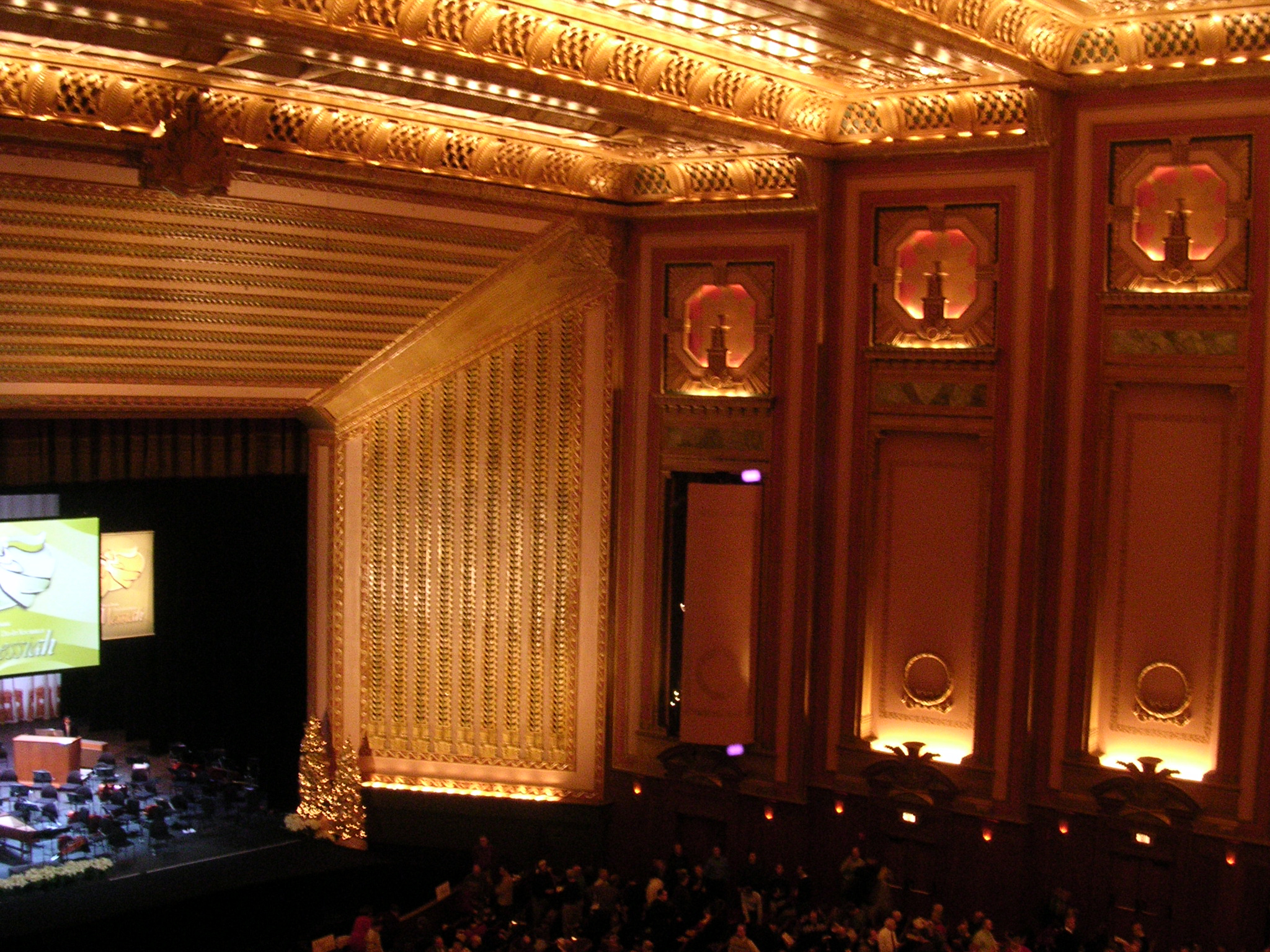
The Ardis Krainik Theatre in the Civic Opera House

The company's permanent home is the Civic Opera House, sections of the building which it rented from 1954 until after the 1993 renovations, when it bought those facilities. It is a 1929 structure with an Art Deco interior. Its 3,276-seat capacity makes it the second-largest opera auditorium in North America after the Metropolitan Opera House in New York City. The interior was named The Ardis Krainik Theatre in 1996 in honor of Ardis Krainik, the former General Director, who was responsible for its renovation from 1993 onwards.

=== Joffrey Ballet ===
In 2017, Lyric Opera of Chicago as house manager of the theater announced that the Joffrey Ballet planned to move from its longtime performance venue at the Auditorium Theatre to the opera house in 2020. The announcement coincided with Lyric's presentation of a new production of Gluck's Orfeo ed Euridice by choreographer John Neumeier; the production fused the musical and ballet elements of the opera and featured the Joffrey Ballet.

== Patrick G. and Shirley W. Ryan Opera Center ==
The Patrick G. and Shirley W. Ryan Opera Center (formerly Lyric Opera Center for American Artists, 1981–2006), established in 1974 as the Lyric Opera School by Carol Fox, is the professional artist-development program for Lyric Opera of Chicago.

The Ryan Opera Center is considered one of the most prestigious vocal programs in America, and has produced notable singers, including:

- René Barbera
- Harolyn Blackwell
- Nicole Cabell
- Mark S. Doss
- Elizabeth Futral
- Cecelia Hall
- Joseph Kaiser
- Quinn Kelsey
- Gary Lehman
- Emily Magee
- Susanna Phillips
- Matthew Polenzani
- Christian Van Horn
- Erin Wall
- Guang Yang
- Kathleen Kuhlmann

Approximately a dozen young singers are selected from the near 400 who audition annually, and they are in residence for twelve months. Over the course of the year they receive advanced instruction in numerous aspects of operatic performance, including voice lessons and coachings, language and acting training, and master classes with some of opera's most renowned artists. The singers gain valuable performing experience by participating in recitals and concerts at many Chicago-area venues. During Lyric's mainstage season, they perform and understudy roles at all levels. The singers work with the world's greatest opera singers, conductors, and directors, thus advancing the young artists’ professionalism. In 2005, author William Murray wrote a book about a year in the life of an entering class at the Ryan Opera Center.

The first director of the Ryan Opera Center during its beginning years from 1974-1981, when it was renamed the Lyric Opera Center for American Artists, and continuing until 1991, when he retired, was Lee Schaenen. Andrew Földi succeeded him as director of the Ryan Opera Center from 1991 to 1995. He was succeeded by Richard Pearlman, who was director of the program from 1995 until his death in 2006. Renowned soprano Gianna Rolandi, who had been the Ryan Opera Center's director of vocal studies and principal instructor since 2002, was appointed director of the program in 2006. The program is now administered by Dan Novak, director; Craig Terry, music director; Julia Faulkner, director of vocal studies, and Renée Fleming, advisor.

== See also ==
- List of museums and cultural institutions in Chicago
