= Carol Fox (Chicago opera) =

Carol Fox (Chicago, June 15, 1926 – July 21, 1981) was, at the age of 28, the first impresario of the Chicago Lyric Opera and credited with restoring Chicago's pre-Depression operatic glory.

Carol was the only child of a wealthy Chicago furniture manufacturer. Her enthusiasm for opera showed itself when she returned home from study in Europe in 1950. With Lawrence Kelly, also aged 28, a real estate agent and insurance broker, and the conductor Nicola Rescigno she organized the rebirth of a resident opera company at the Chicago Civic Opera building. In 1958 she engaged Pino Donati from Italy as her assistant and artistic director - a function in which he continued till his death in 1975. Fox was ousted from the board of the opera in 1981 and died shortly afterwards.
