= Calaroga Hall, North Adelaide =

Coordinates: 34°54′16″S 138°35′27″E

The Calaroga Hall was a building at 200 Jeffcott Street, North Adelaide, South Australia, built by the Catholic archdiocese of Adelaide in 1923 and named for the birthplace of St Dominic, now spelled Caleruega. Sometime around 1960 it changed owners and is now the Estonian Hall.

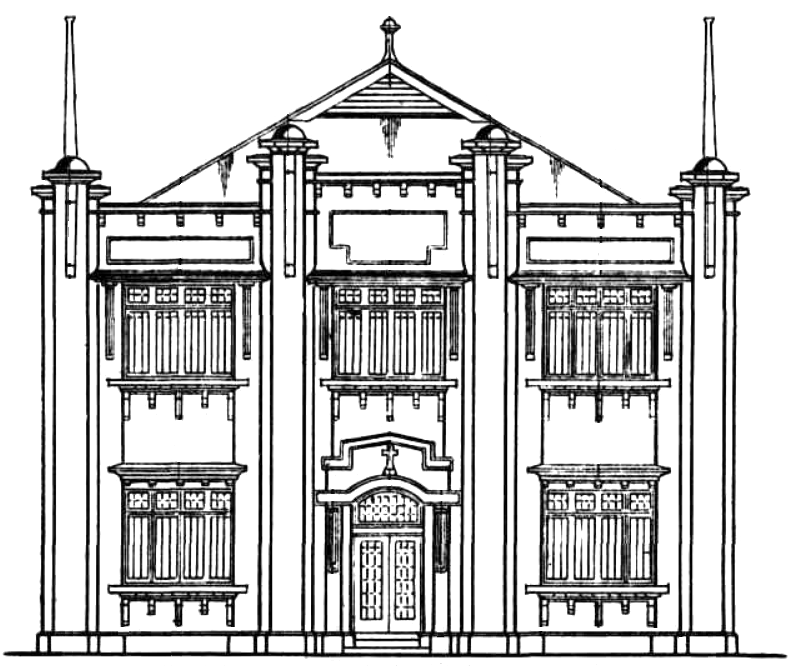
Calaroga Hall, North Adelaide

The idea for a hall for staging of plays, lectures, dances and other parochial activities, was mooted by the fathers of St Lawrence's Church, North Adelaide, following the example of Calaroga Hall at 25 Rutland (now Parnell) Square, Dublin, founded in 1901 by Rev. P. A. Murphy OP as an entertainment centre on temperance principles in a city renowned for consumption of alcohol as a social activity.

On 11 March 1923 the foundation stone was laid at the corner of Jeffcott and Childers streets by Rev. Robert Spence, OP, DD, the Archbishop of Adelaide. The festivities were dampened by the death of three-year-old Peggy Klose, daughter of star footballer Albert Klose, killed when a temporary flagpole supporting the decorations collapsed.

The hall, of 65 by 47 feet (20 by 14 m), was opened on 25 November 1923 by the Lord Mayor of Adelaide, Lewis Cohen, after an introduction by Rev. Father Doyle OP.

By 1966 the property had changed hands, and was listed as the Estonian Hall.
