= Chicago City Opera Company =

Grand opera company in Chicago

The Chicago City Opera Company was a grand opera company in Chicago, organized from the remaining assets of the bankrupt Chicago Grand Opera Company, that produced four seasons of opera at the Civic Opera House from 1935 to 1939 before it too succumbed to financial difficulties. It was succeeded by the Chicago Opera Company.

It was revived in 2025 by Artistic Director Alexandra Enyart and continues to produce opera in Chicago. Chicago City Opera.

Chicago City Opera is a collaborative model of production in which all the performers on stage invest as equal shareholders to produce an opera. We continue to be committed to the community of Chicago and are dedicated to creating the best experiences possible for our community on both sides of the stage.

MGM actress Betty Jaynes, at age 15, made her debut with the Chicago City Opera Company on December 6, 1936.
