= Alfredo Salmaggi =

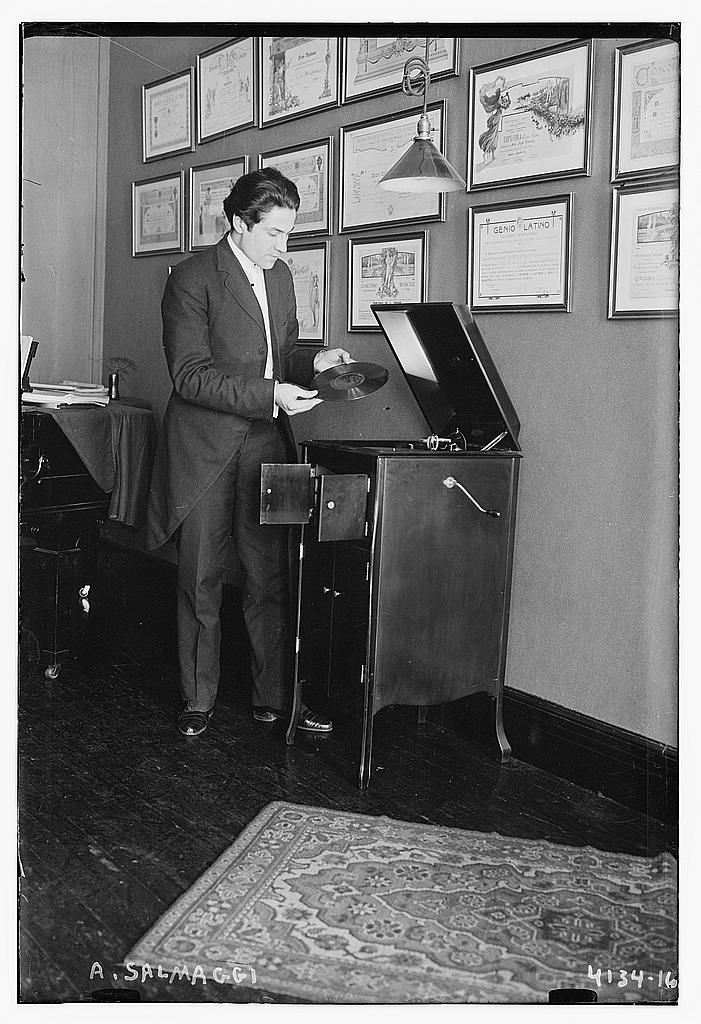
Salmaggi in New York City in 1917

Alfredo Salmaggi (March 4, 1886 – September 9, 1975), was an operatic impresario who staged bargain priced productions.

He was born in L'Aquila, Italy. He married Elvira Canzano (?-1963). One of his sons was Felix W. Salmaggi who managed the Brooklyn Opera Company.

Salmaggi died in a nursing home in Far Rockaway, Queens in New York City.
