= Fortune Gallo =

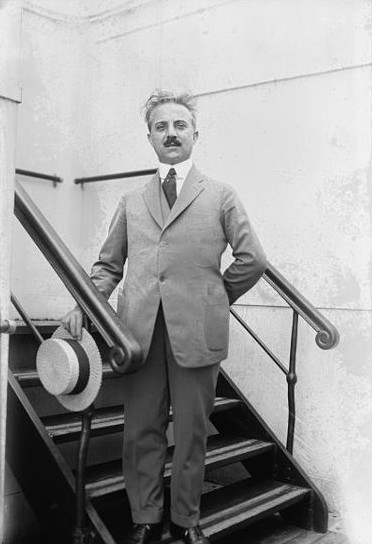
- Born: Fortune Thomas Gallo; May 9, 1878; Torremaggiore, Italy
- Died: March 28, 1970 (aged 91); New York City, New York, U.S.
- Occupation: Opera impresario
- Notable work: Gallo Opera House

Fortune Thomas Gallo (May 9, 1878 – March 28, 1970) (born Fortunato Gallo) was an Italian-born opera impresario. Gallo was owner and General Manager of the traveling San Carlo Opera Company from 1913 until its disbandment in the late 1950s.

== Biography ==
He was born on May 9, 1878, at Torremaggiore, Italy, a town in the province of Foggia, to Zelinda Accetturo and Tommaso Gallo. He had two sisters, Antonia and Marianna and two brothers, Giuseppe and Giovanni, who became Italian army officers. His childhood was spent at Torremaggiore, where he became involved with music and musicians, especially the "Banda Rossa," which would prove of importance later in his life. In 1895, aboard the vessel "Werra," Gallo immigrated to the United States. He worked as a clerk in an Italian bank on Mulberry Street in New York City. From that base it appears Gallo became involved in politics on the local level, amassing contacts and influence within the Italian community.

Shortly after the turn of the twentieth century the "Banda Rosa" was engaged to play in America. Emanating from this situation was the acquaintance of Gallo with Channing Ellery, a patron of music, that led to Gallo's work as an advance man from Ellery's band. By 1910 Gallo had also become manager of another band, operated by Giuseppe Creatore. That same year he rescued an Italian opera company led by Mario Lombardi that was stranded in St. Louis, Missouri, by bringing them to New York City and untangling the company's financial difficulties, ultimately assuming its management in December, 1913, and renaming it the San Carlo Opera Company. The company fared well, and in 1927 Gallo built the Gallo Opera House on West 54th Street in New York City which would become Studio 54.

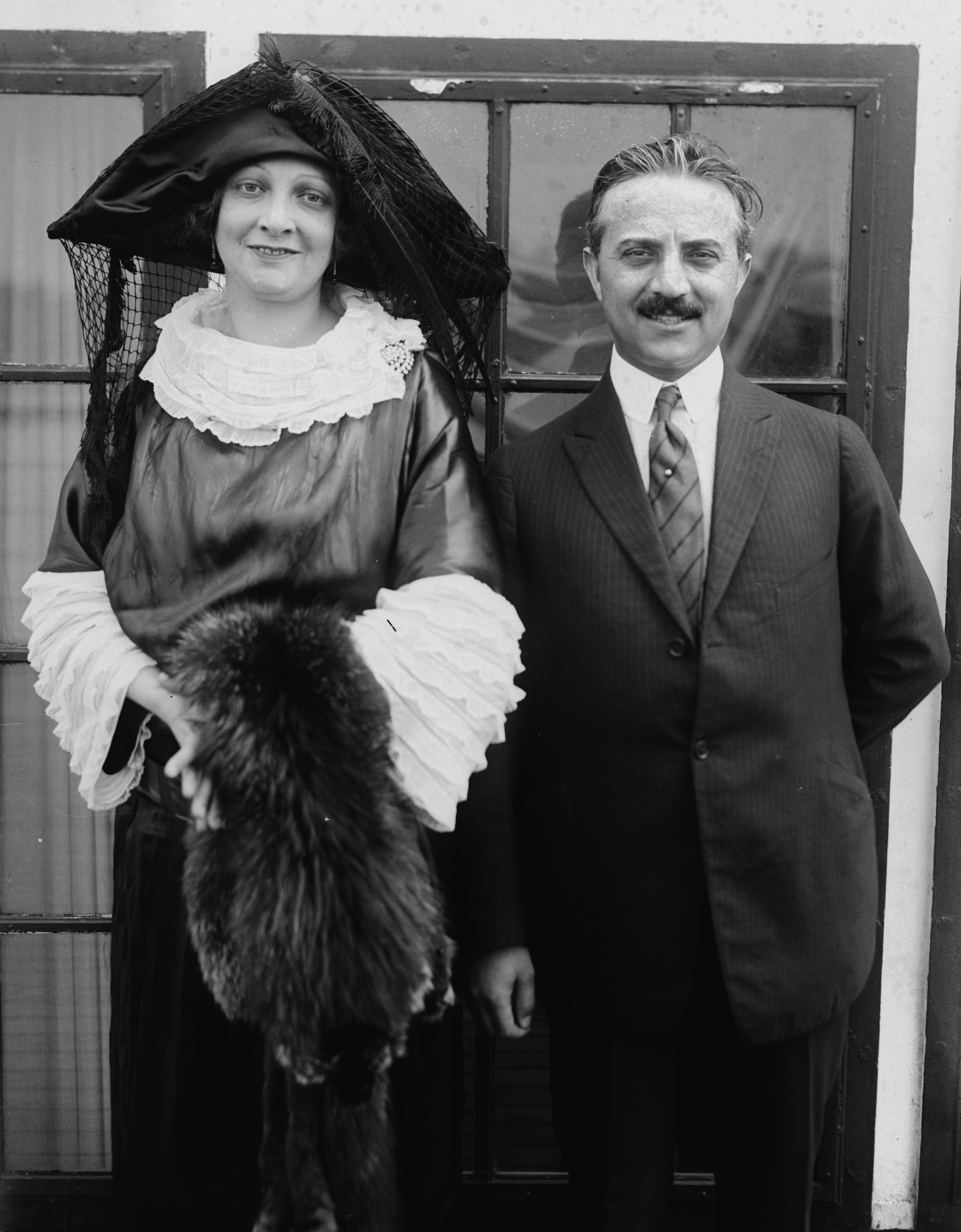
Gallo with his wife Sofia Charlebois c. 1922

He not only toured the United States, Canada, Europe, and South America with San Carlo, but in addition, managed Anna Pavlova's ballet company, as well as other troupes. In 1929 Gallo produced the first full-length sound movie of an opera, Leoncavallo's "I Pagliacci". Furthermore, he managed the Chicago Opera Company in the early 1940s. Fortune Gallo's managerial abilities were lauded because he made opera "pay". Numerous periodical articles described Gallo's skills, with one portraying his as having produced opera for the "masses and not the classes". The impresario, often labeled the "cut rate opera king," financed and toured with the San Carlo for over forty-five years.

He died on March 28, 1970, in New York City.

== Personal ==
On May 4, 1912, Gallo married Sofia Charlebois, an American lyric soprano in the San Carlo company. She died in 1948.

== Sources ==
- Gallo, Fortune, 1878-1970, Papers last retrieved September 1, 2007
- Gallo, Fortune, "Lucky Rooster," Exposition Press, New York, 1967.
- San Carlo Opera Founder, Fortune Gallo, Dead at 91, The Palm Beach Post - Mar 30, 1970
