= Chicago Opera Company =

US musical group

The Chicago Opera Company was a grand opera company in Chicago, organized from the remaining assets of the bankrupt Chicago City Opera Company, that produced six seasons of opera at the Civic Opera House from 1940 to 1946 (excluding 1943). Artistic directors included Carlo Peroni (1941–1942) and Fausto Cleva (1944–1946), and until 1945 Fortune Gallo was general manager. After the war, when consumer goods became more abundant and people spent less money on entertainment, interest in opera collapsed and the company went bankrupt. Rather than try to re-organize, the remaining assets were given to the largest creditor, the landlord of the Civic Opera House, Household Finance, who then paid off the other remaining creditors. After the final collapse of an opera company that had been re-organized five times, there was no resident Chicago opera company until the founding of the Lyric Opera in 1954. One of the original group of organizers was Max Rabinoff.

== See also ==
- San Carlo Opera Company
- Chicago Lyric Opera
