= San Carlo Opera Company =

Name of two opera companies in the US

The San Carlo Opera Company was the name of two different opera companies active in the United States during the first half of the twentieth century.

== Henry Russell's San Carlo Opera ==
The first company was founded by impresario Henry Russell, initially as a touring arm of the Teatro di San Carlo of Naples, Italy, in 1904. The company soon became its own institution and toured to The Royal Opera, London, in the Fall of 1905 and Boston in early 1906. The group remained based in Boston and gave tours annually of mostly Italian operas throughout the United States from 1906 to 1909 in addition to giving performances in Boston. With the opening of the Boston Opera House in 1909, the company essentially became the seed for the newly formed Boston Opera Company under the leadership of Russell. Notable singers to perform with Russell's San Carlo Opera Company included sopranos Fély Dereyne, Alice Nielsen, Lillian Nordica, and Tarquinia Tarquini; tenors Florencio Constantino, Riccardo Martin, and Umberto Sacchetti; contralto Rosa Olitzka; and bass Andrés de Segurola.

== Fortune Gallo's San Carlo Opera ==
The second San Carlo Opera Company was a touring grand opera company founded by the Italian-American impresario Fortune Gallo. Taking over management of a touring opera company led by Mario Lambardi that was stranded in St. Louis, Missouri, in 1910, Gallo brought them back to New York City, untangled their finances, and reorganized them as the San Carlo Opera Company, opening in December 1913 with a premier performance featuring Carmen. Until its disbandment in the mid-1950s, the company – 100 strong, including 30 instrumentalists – toured annually in the United States and Canada, visiting cities and towns poorly served by other companies, and often ventured as far afield as Europe, and South America.

Part of Gallo's success was his innovation of using local talent and heavily advertising their use to spur ticket sales. In addition, the company was led under the musical direction of conductor Carlo Peroni from 1921 until his death twenty-three years later. Under Peroni's leadership the company fared well, and in 1927 Gallo built the Gallo Opera House on West 54th Street in New York City. It would later become Studio 54. Gallo also worked with impresario Tomasso Nazzaro, originally from Italy, but who was establishing himself in Boston. Gallo named him the New England managing director for the San Carlo Opera, which aided in the success of the company. The San Carlo company holds the distinction of having performed in the very first sound film of a complete opera, Pagliacci, in 1929. Gallo did not try to turn the opera into a "moving picture", rather this was a filmed stage production, with stage sets, framed by the proscenium arch. During the war years of 1943 and 1944, Gallo produced a full season of opera in Chicago, which had lacked a resident opera company for some years, under the name Chicago Opera Company, using both his San Carlo company and visiting artists. Upon Peroni's death in 1944, Nicola Rescigno assumed the role of music director. He was succeeded in 1947 by Carlo Moresco who served as the company's music director until its demise roughly ten years later.
