= List of compositions by Samuel Barber =

This is a list of compositions by Samuel Barber sorted by genre, opus number, date of composition, and title.

Genre	Opus	Date	Title	Scoring	Notes
Opera	32	1956–1957, 1964	Vanessa	for 7 character soloists, chorus, orchestra	4 acts; revised 1964 to 3 acts; libretto by Gian Carlo Menotti
Opera	35	1959	A Hand of Bridge	for 4 character soloists & chamber orchestra	1 act; libretto by Gian Carlo Menotti
Opera	40	1966, 1975	Antony and Cleopatra	for 31 character soloists, chorus, orchestra	3 acts; original version libretto by Franco Zeffirelli using the text of the play by William Shakespeare; revised 1975 version libretto by Gian Carlo Menotti
Ballet		1946	Serpent Heart	for dancers & ensemble: piccolo, flute, oboe, english horn, bassoon, clarinet, horn, piano, string quartet, double bass	original stage version for Martha Graham; revised as Cave of the Heart; later extracted as orchestral suite Medea, Op. 23
Ballet		1947	Cave of the Heart	for dancers & 13-instrument ensemble	original stage version for Martha Graham; revised version of Serpent Heart; later extracted as orchestral suite Medea, Op. 23
Ballet	28	1955	Souvenirs	for dancers & orchestra	orchestration and choreographing of Souvenirs piano suite
Orchestral	1	1944	Serenade	for string orchestra	original for string quartet
Orchestral	5	1931	Overture to "The School for Scandal"	for orchestra	
Orchestral	7	1933	Music for a Scene from Shelley	for orchestra	Tone Picture after Prometheus Unbound by Percy Bysshe Shelley
Orchestral	9	1935–1936, 1942–1943	First Symphony (in One Movement)	for orchestra	
Orchestral	11a	1936	Adagio for Strings	for string orchestra	adaptation of the slow movement of the String Quartet, Op. 11
Orchestral	12	1938	(First) Essay for Orchestra	for orchestra	
Orchestral	17	1942	Second Essay for Orchestra	for orchestra	
Orchestral	19	1944, 1947	Symphony No. 2	for orchestra	movement II revised 1947 to replace the electronic tone generator with an E-flat clarinet; work withdrawn and destroyed 1964, except for movement II published with minor revisions as Night Flight; complete score discovered 1984, republished 1990
Orchestral	19a	1964	Night Flight, Tone Poem	for orchestra	revision of Symphony No. 2, Op. 19, movement II
Orchestral		1945	Horizon	for chamber orchestra	
Orchestral	23	1947	Medea, Suite: 1. Parodos; 2. Choros - Medea and Jason; 3. The Young Princess - Jason; 4. Choros; 5. Medea; 6. Kantikos Agonias; 7. Exodos	for orchestra	extracted and revised from ballet Serpent Heart/Cave of the Heart
Orchestral	23a	1955	Medea's Dance of Vengeance	for orchestra	originally titled Medea's Meditation and Dance of Vengeance, changed c.1980; revised extract from the suite Medea, Op. 23
Orchestral		1958	Intermezzo	for orchestra	from the opera Vanessa, Op. 32
Orchestral	37	1960	Die Natali, Chorale Preludes for Christmas	for orchestra	
Orchestral	44	1971	A Fadograph of a Yestern Scene	for orchestra	Tone Picture after Finnegans Wake by James Joyce
Orchestral	47	1978	Third Essay for Orchestra	for orchestra	
Concert band		1943	Commando March	for band	
Concert band		1943	Funeral March	for band	
Concertante	14	1939–1940	Violin Concerto	for violin and orchestra	
Concertante	21	1944	Capricorn Concerto	for flute, oboe, trumpet and string orchestra	
Concertante	22	1945	Cello Concerto	for cello and orchestra	
Concertante	36	1960	Toccata Festiva	for organ and orchestra	Composed for the inauguration of the Academy of Music's new organ funded by Mary Louise Curtis, who also commissioned this piece. The premiere was given in September 1960 by Paul Callaway on organ, and Eugene Ormandy and the Philadelphia Orchestra.
Concertante	38	1961–1962	Piano Concerto	for piano and orchestra	
Concertante	48	1977–1978	Oboe Concerto	for oboe and orchestra	unfinished, only 2nd movement Canzonetta completed but not orchestrated; Canzonetta orchestrated for oboe and strings by Charles Turner and published in 1981 posthumously as "Opus 48"
Chamber music		1922	Gypsy Dance from The Rose Tree	for violin and piano	
Chamber music	1	1928	Serenade	for 2 violins, viola and cello	also arranged for string orchestra (1944)
Chamber music	4	1928	Violin Sonata in F minor	for violin and piano	lost/destroyed, movement III (Allegro agitato) discovered 2006; won the 1929 Joseph H. Bearns Prize in Music at Columbia University
Chamber music	6	1932	Cello Sonata	for cello and piano	
Chamber music	11	1936	String Quartet in B minor	for 2 violins, viola and cello	slow movement arranged for string orchestra as Adagio for Strings (1936)
Chamber music		1941	Commemorative March	for violin, cello and piano	
Chamber music		1947	String Quartet in E major, second mvt. only	for 2 violins, viola and cello	commission from Elizabeth Sprague Coolidge; 17 extant manuscript pages of movement II.
Chamber music		1954	Adventure	for flute, clarinet, horn, African and oriental percussion instruments (2 players) and harp	
Chamber music	31	1956	Summer Music for Wind Quintet	for flute, oboe, clarinet, horn and bassoon	
Chamber music		1960s	Chorale for Washington Cathedral	for brass and timpani	
Chamber music	38a	1961	Canzone	for flute or violin, and piano	composer's arrangement of the Piano Concerto, Op. 38, movement II
Chamber music		1967	Mutations from Bach	for brass and tympani	
Carillon		1931	Suite	for carillon	
Organ		1925	To Longwood Gardens	for organ	
Organ		1927	Prelude and Fugue in B minor	for organ	
Organ		1936	Chorale for a New Organ	for organ	
Organ	34	1959	"Wondrous Love", Variations on a Shape-Note Hymn	for organ	
Organ	37	1960	Chorale Prelude on "Silent Night" from Die Natali	for organ	
Piano		1917	Melody in F	for piano	
Piano		1917	Sadness	for piano	
Piano		1918	Largo	for piano	
Piano		1918	War Song	for piano	
Piano		1919	At Twilight	for piano	
Piano		1919	Lullaby	for piano	
Piano		1923–1924	3 Sketches: 1. Love Song; 2. To My Steinway; 3. Minuet	for piano	
Piano		1924	Fantasie (written in the style of Joseph Haydn)	for 2 pianos	
Piano		1925	Prelude to a Tragic Drama	for piano	
Piano		1925–1926	Fresh from West Chester (Some Jazzing)	for piano	
Piano		1926	Essay III	for piano	
Piano		1931	Interlude No. 1 (Adagio for Jeanne)	for piano	
Piano		1932	Interlude No. 2	for piano	
Piano	20	1944	Excursions	for piano	
Piano	26	1948	Piano Sonata	for piano	
Piano	28	1952	Souvenirs, Suite: 1. Waltz; 2. Schottische; 3. Pas de deux 4. Two-Step; 5. Hesitation-Tango; 6. Galop	for piano 4-hands	also arranged for piano solo; orchestrated and choreographed as ballet Souvenirs
Piano	28	1954	Souvenirs, Suite	for piano	arrangement of piano 4-hands suite
Piano	33	1959	Nocturne (Homage to John Field)	for piano	
Piano		1960s	After the Concert	for piano	
Piano	46	1977	Ballade	for piano	
Choral		1930	Motetto on Words from the Book of Job	for (double) mixed chorus a cappella	biblical text from the Book of Job
Choral	8	1935–1936; 1936	2 Choruses: 1. The Virgin Martyrs; 2. Let Down the Bars, O Death	1. for female chorus a cappella 2. for mixed chorus a cappella	1. words by Helen Waddell; 2. words by Emily Dickinson
Choral		1937	Heaven-Haven		choral adaptation of A Nun Takes the Veil from Op. 13; words by Gerard Manley Hopkins
Choral		1967	Agnus Dei (Lamb of God)	for chorus and organ or piano ad libitum	vocal adaptation of Adagio for Strings, Op. 11a
Choral		1938	God's Grandeur	for double mixed chorus a cappella	text by Gerard Manley Hopkins
Choral		1938	Sure on This Shining Night	for mixed chorus and piano	choral adaptation the song from Op. 13; words by James Agee
Choral	15	1940	A Stopwatch and an Ordnance Map	for male chorus, kettledrums and brass	words by Stephen Spender
Choral	43	1971	The Lovers	for baritone, chorus and orchestra	based on Twenty Love Poems and a Song of Despair by Pablo Neruda
Choral	16	1939–1940	Reincarnations: 1. Mary Hynes; 2. Anthony O'Daly; 3. The Coolin (The Fair Haired One)	for mixed chorus	words by Antoine Ó Raifteirí in translation by James Stephens
Choral		1953	The Monk and His Cat		choral adaptation from Hermit Songs, Op. 29
Choral	30	1954	Prayers of Kierkegaard	for soprano, chorus and orchestra	words by Søren Kierkegaard
Choral		1957–1958	Under the Willow Tree	for mixed chorus and piano	choral adaptation from the opera Vanessa, Op. 32
Choral		1965	Chorale for Ascension Day (Easter Chorale)	for mixed chorus, brass, timpani and organ (ad libitum)	Op. 40 [sic]; words by Pack Browning
Choral		1966	2 Choruses from "Antony and Cleopatra": 1. On the Death of Antony; 2. On the Death of Cleopatra	1. for female chorus and piano 2. for mixed chorus and piano	choral extracts from the opera Antony and Cleopatra
Choral	42	1968	2 Pieces: 1. Twelfth Night; 2. To Be Sung on the Water	for mixed chorus a cappella	dedicated to Florence Kimball; 1. words by Laurie Lee; 2. words by Louise Bogan
Vocal		1917	Sometime	for voice and piano	words by Eugene Field
Vocal		1918	In the Firelight	for voice and piano	
Vocal		1919	Isabel	for voice and piano	words by John Greenleaf Whittier
Vocal		1920?	October-Weather	for voice and piano	
Vocal		1924	My Fairlyland	for voice and piano	words by Robert Thomas Kerlin
Vocal		1924	2 Poems of the Wind: 1. Little Children of the Wind; 2. Longing	for voice and piano	words by Fiona Macleod
Vocal		1925	A Slumber Song of the Madonna	for voice and piano	words by Alfred Noyes
Vocal		1925	Fantasy in Purple	for voice and piano	words by Langston Hughes
Vocal		1925	2 Songs of Youth: 1. Invocation to Youth; 2. I Never Thought That Youth Would Go	for voice and piano	1. words by Laurence Binyon; 2. words by Jessie B. Rittenhouse
Vocal		1926	Ask Me To Rest	for voice and piano	words by Edward Hicks Streeter Terry
Vocal		1926	Man	for voice and piano	words by Humbert Wolfe
Vocal		1926	Watchers	for voice and piano	words by Dean Cornwell (or Edgar Daniel Kramer)
Vocal		1926?	Music, When Soft Voices Die	for voice and piano	words by Percy Bysshe Shelley
Vocal		1927	Mother, I Can Not Mind My Wheel	for voice and piano	words by Walter Savage Landor
Vocal		1927	Thy Love	for voice and piano	words by Elizabeth Barrett Browning
Vocal		1927	There's Nae Lark	for voice and piano	words by Algernon Charles Swinburne
Vocal	2	1927; 1928; 1934	3 Songs: 1. The Daisies; 2. With Rue My Heart Is Laden; 3. Bessie Bobtail	for voice and piano	1. words by James Stephens; 2. words by A. E. Housman; 3. words by James Stephens
Vocal	3	1931	Dover Beach	for baritone and string quartet	words by Matthew Arnold
Vocal		1934	Love at the Door	for voice and piano	words by John Addington Symonds
Vocal		1934	Serenader	for voice and piano	words by George Dillon
Vocal		1935	Love's Caution	for voice and piano	words by W. H. Davies
Vocal		1935	Night Wanderers	for voice and piano	words by W. H. Davies
Vocal		1935	Of That So Sweet Imprisonment	for voice and piano	words by James Joyce
Vocal		1935	Strings in the Earth and Air	for voice and piano	words by James Joyce
Vocal		1936	Beggar's Song	for voice and piano	words by W. H. Davies
Vocal	10	1936	3 Songs: 1. Rain Has Fallen; 2. Sleep Now; 3. I Hear an Army	for voice and piano	words by James Joyce: 3. also orchestrated
Vocal		1937	In the Dark Pinewood	for voice and piano	words by James Joyce
Vocal	13	1937–1940; 1937; 1938; 1938; 1940	4 Songs: 1. A Nun Takes the Veil (Heaven-Haven); 2. The Secrets of the Old; 3. Sure on This Shining Night; 4. Nocturne	for voice and piano	1. words by Gerard Manley Hopkins; 2. words by W. B. Yeats; 3. words by James Agee; also orchestrated 4. words by Frederic Prokosch; also orchestrated
Vocal		1940	Song for a New House	for voice, piano, and flute with ad libitum cadenza	composed for Mary Louise Curtis; text from Shakespeare's A Midsummer Night's Dream, Act V, scene i.
Vocal	18	1942; 1943	2 Songs: 1. The Queen's Face on the Summery Coin; 2. Monks and Raisins	for voice and piano	1. words by Robert Horan; 2. words by Jose Garcia Villa
Vocal	24	1947	Knoxville: Summer of 1915	for soprano and orchestra	words by James Agee
Vocal	25	1947	Nuvoletta	for voice and piano	words by James Joyce
Vocal	27	1950–1951	Mélodies passagères: 1. Puisque tout passe 2. Un cygne 3. Tombeau dans un parc 4. Le clocher chante 5. Départ	for voice and piano	words by Rainer Maria Rilke
Vocal	29	1953	Hermit Songs: 1. At Saint Patrick's Purgatory; 2. Church Bells at Night; 3. St. Ita's Vision; 4. The Heavenly Banquet; 5. The Crucifixion; 6. Sea-Snatch; 7. Promiscuity; 8. The Monk and His Cat; 9. The Praises of God; 10. The Desire for Hermitage	for voice and piano	poems translated from anonymous Irish texts of the 8th to 13th centuries
Vocal	39	1962	Andromache's Farewell	for soprano and orchestra	text from The Trojan Women by Euripides, translated by John Patrick Creagh
Vocal	41	1968–1969	Despite and Still: 1. A Last Song; 2. My Lizard (Wish for a Young Love); 3. In the Wilderness; 4. Solitary Hotel; 5. Despite and Still	for voice and piano	1. words by Robert Graves; 2. words by Theodore Roethke; 3. words by Robert Graves; 4. words by James Joyce; 5. words by Robert Graves
Vocal	45	1972	3 Songs: 1. Now Have I Fed and Eaten Up the Rose; 2. A Green Lowland of Pianos; 3. O Boundless, Boundless Evening	for voice and piano	1. words by James Joyce, translation of a poem by Gottfried Keller; 2. words by Czesław Miłosz; 3. words by Christopher Middleton
