= Massimo Freccia =

- Massimo Freccia (photo with 1960 autograph)
- Born: Massimo Filippo Antongiulio Maria Freccia
- Occupation: conductor

Massimo Filippo Antongiulio Maria Freccia (19 September 1906 – 16 November 2004) was an Italian American conductor. He had an international reputation but never held a post as music director of a major orchestra or opera house. Unusually for an Italian, he built his career around symphonic music rather than opera. For several years he was an assistant to Arturo Toscanini, whom he venerated, and he was regularly invited by Toscanini to conduct the NBC Symphony Orchestra.

Massimo Freccia came from a wealthy background and counted royalty and aristocrats among his friends. He was born on 19 September 1906 in the Tuscan village of Valdibure, near Pistoia, not far from Florence. His father was a solicitor and landowner, his mother from an aristocratic Pistoian family. She was a good amateur pianist, and encouraged Massimo's growing interest in music, engaging a violin teacher for him when he was six. He had no formal school education.

When World War I broke out, his Russian great-aunt came to live with them. Brought up by his mother on Vivaldi and Corelli, he was introduced to Tchaikovsky, Schumann and Wagner which his great-aunt played for hours on the piano. She recounted tales of her youth in Saint Petersburg when she met Tchaikovsky and Rimsky-Korsakov.

In 1923, when he was 17, Freccia went to the Florence Conservatory of Music, where he became friends with the composer Luigi Dallapiccola, who introduced him to the music of the contemporary school of Italian non-operatic composers such as Gian Francesco Malipiero, Giorgio Federico Ghedini, Goffredo Petrassi and Alfredo Casella.

Freccia began to conduct in a garage adjoining the family's villa in Florence, which he converted into a studio where he and his fellow-students played through works for small orchestra. He was entirely self-taught as a conductor, learning mainly by watching others. He obtained a job as apprentice at the opera in Florence, playing the celesta in the pit and then rushing backstage to play the harmonium so that the prima donna could stay on pitch.

From Florence he went to Vienna, where he heard Richard Strauss conduct his operas, Mozart masses in the churches, and Bruckner and Mahler symphonies in the concert-halls. At an Italian Embassy party he met Franz Schalk, then music director of the State Opera. When Freccia expressed his admiration for the young Wilhelm Furtwängler's concerts, Schalk turned frosty and described Furtwängler as a "talented amateur". But he gave Freccia a pass to attend rehearsals at the Opera, where he heard singers such as Elisabeth Schumann, Lotte Lehmann, Leo Slezak and Alfred Piccaver. He also heard Schalk conduct the Vienna premiere of Stravinsky's Oedipus Rex.

Freccia then moved for two years to Paris, where he met Jean Cocteau, Stravinsky and Picasso. He also met the pianist Arthur Rubinstein and the composer Maurice Ravel, to whom he showed a tone-poem which he had composed in Vienna. Ravel played some of it, studied the score, complimented Freccia on his technique and orchestration and ended by saying: "But my dear young man, all that is very good, but it's all Ravel!"

His friendship with the composer Joaquín Nin led to his first engagement in 1929. When a ballet company was formed in Paris around the dancer Antonia Mercé y Luque (known as La Argentina), Freccia was appointed assistant conductor. This led to a post as conductor of a group specialising in contemporary Italian music. After a spell with them, he returned to Vienna to conduct the Vienna Symphony Orchestra, where he was noticed by a Hungarian who had just founded the Budapest Symphony Orchestra. Freccia was appointed conductor and met Zoltán Kodály and Béla Bartók. He conducted the first performance of the orchestral version of the latter's Transylvanian Dances. In 1934 Freccia took the orchestra on an Italian tour. Benito Mussolini attended the concert, in Rome, and summoned Freccia to meet him next day in the Palazzo Venezia to discuss his views on the string section.

While on a visit to New York in 1937, Freccia was invited - on Toscanini's recommendation - to return the following year to conduct the New York Philharmonic in a series of summer concerts at the Lewissohn Stadium. Sensing that war in Europe was inevitable, he sought a residence visa for the United States. Through Arthur Judson, the NYPO manager, he accepted an engagement with the Havana Philharmonic Orchestra, thereby being able to return from Cuba on a permanent Italian visa. He found the orchestra a poor ensemble, but trained it skillfully and was appointed its music director 1939-43. Soloists of the quality of Arthur Rubinstein and Jascha Heifetz played with it. It was in Cuba that he forged a friendship with George Gershwin and met his future wife Maria Luisa (Nena) Azpiazu.

After four years Freccia returned to New York on a special visa. He was rejected for the U.S. Army, and in 1944 became conductor of the New Orleans Symphony Orchestra, where he remained for eight years. He returned to Cuba in 1945 to marry Nena.

In 1952 he left New Orleans for the Baltimore Symphony Orchestra. Freccia made his London debut in October 1954 with the London Philharmonic Orchestra (LPO) in the Royal Festival Hall, conducting the British premiere of Samuel Barber's oratorio Prayers of Kierkegaard. This had not been a success at its American premiere, but Freccia had liked it and persuaded Barber to revise and cut it. The composer told him: "It's practically your work."

Freccia returned to London for several years as guest conductor of the LPO, the Philharmonia, the Royal Philharmonic Orchestra (RPO) and the BBC Symphony Orchestra. In 1959 Freccia returned to Italy for six years as conductor of the RAI Orchestra. During that time he twice conducted concerts for Pope John XXIII. Freccia made some international tours, conducting in Japan in 1967 and then in Australia. In later years he conducted frequently in Monte Carlo. For four years he conducted concerts with the Juilliard Orchestra in New York. He returned to Vienna in 1981 to conduct the Radio Orchestra and conducted the RPO in London in 1983 and 1986 in concerts for the RAF Benevolent Fund. His last London appearance was on 15 June 1987, when he conducted Verdi's Requiem at the Festival Hall in the presence of Diana, Princess of Wales in commemoration of the 30th anniversary of Toscanini's death. Freccia lived in London for many years.

His last concert was in 1998 when, at the age of 92, he conducted Beethoven's Ninth Symphony in the square at Montepulciano.

He made fine recordings of Berlioz’s Symphonie fantastique with the RPO, and Shostakovich’s Fifth Symphony with the LPO, as well as several discs of the Russian and Italian repertoire. He accompanied soloists such as Arturo Benedetti Michelangeli and Earl Wild in the piano concerto repertoire.

Massimo Freccia published an autobiography, The Sounds of Memory, in 1990 when he was 84, in which he expressed candid views on other conductors. Most of them, he wrote, were too conceited, mistrustful and even occasionally vicious. Sir Thomas Beecham, for instance, "emphasised his pomposity" by his poses and pretensions. "Not once have I been touched by his performances. I always found his artistry superficial." Herbert von Karajan was "not a nice man". Leopold Stokowski produced a lush sound, yet "one had the feeling that underneath there was something false. His speech was particularly affected... He gave the impression of a glittering, multi-coloured painted shell; when one looked inside one found an infinite emptiness." Only Toscanini escaped savage censure, although Freccia conceded that his reputation for strict observance of the score was a myth.

He died on 16 November 2004, aged 98, survived by his wife. They had no children, although she had a daughter from her first marriage.

== Sources ==
- Telegraph obituary
- Gramophone obituary
