= Symphony No. 2 (Barber) =

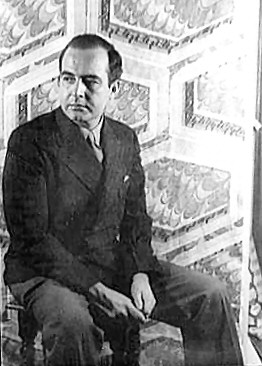
Samuel Barber in 1944

Symphony No. 2, Op. 19 is a three-movement work for orchestra by the American composer Samuel Barber. The 25-minute work was originally written in 1944. The work underwent many revisions and was finally published in 1950. The original manuscript was withdrawn by Barber in 1964. He ordered that G. Schirmer destroy the original manuscript and all scores in their library. The work remained unpublished for many years until 1984 when a set of parts turned up in a warehouse in England. Renewed interest in Barber's work led to a 1990 reprint of the 1950 edition.

== History ==
=== Composition ===
Samuel Barber began his composition career at the age of seven. He was accepted in the prestigious Curtis Institute of Music at age 14. He received critical acclaim for his early compositions including the Overture to the School for Scandal and Adagio for Strings. His early success led to a commission from the United States Air Force in 1943 to write a "symphonic work about flyers". The request came soon after he joined the United States Army in 1942. Barber spent time at a U.S. Air Force base so that he could take part in flight training and battle simulations. He was given four months to write the piece with the understanding that the army would receive all of the royalties forever.

General Barton K. Yount approached Samuel Barber about the commission and asked him to include "modern devices" in the composition. Barber honored this request by using an electronic tone-generator built by Bell Telephone Laboratories in the second movement. This device was intended to represent the sound of a radio beam used to guide night flyers. The symphony was revised in 1947 to replace the electronic tone-generator with an E♭ clarinet.

=== Premiere ===
Symphony No. 2 was premiered on March 3, 1944, by the Boston Symphony Orchestra. Serge Koussevitzky conducted the premiere performance at Symphony Hall in Boston, MA.

=== Revisions ===
Samuel Barber withdrew the symphony in 1964 and ordered the destruction of the score and parts. His explanation implied to some that his piece was war propaganda. He went on to say, "Times of cataclysm are rarely conducive to the creation of good music, especially when the composer tries to say too much. But the lyrical voice, expressing the dilemma of the individual, may still be of reverence." Barber initially thought that the symphony was one of his finest works. However, after twenty years with infrequent performances, he decided that the symphony was, in his words, "not a good work".

A set of orchestral parts that somehow escaped destruction were found in an English G. Schirmer warehouse in 1984. The parts were returned to New York where they were used for a recording by the New Zealand Symphony Orchestra with Andrew Schenck conducting. A renewed interest in the music of Samuel Barber led to a re-release of Barber's revised second symphony in 1990. In 1964 Barber salvaged the second movement of Symphony No. 2 as a tone poem, to which he gave the title Night Flight, Op. 19a. The single-movement work is identical to the symphony movement with only a few minor adjustments. Barber also incorporated the opening themes from the first movement of Symphony No. 2 in his opera, Anthony and Cleopatra (1966), and his orchestral work, Fadograph of a Yestern Scene (1971).

== Reception ==
The original release of Barber's Symphony No. 2 was widely criticized for various reasons. Several critics felt that the work was little more than war time propaganda. Many people complained about the inclusion of the electronic tone-generator in a symphonic work. Despite much criticism, the work also received many positive reviews. The work was generally viewed as Barber's most ambitious and contemporary work. There was a great sense of tension and energy in the work that was palpable to audiences.

== Analysis ==
The symphony has three movements:

1. Allegro ma non troppo
2. Andante, un poco mosso
3. Presto, senza battuta – Allegro risoluto

The thematic material of Symphony No. 2 is designed to emulate the sensation of flying. Barber was very clear that he did not view the symphony as program music. However, in his program notes he mentions that the first movement was meant to capture the excitement of flying while the second movement was inspired by his night flights. The final movement begins with very fast string passages with no barlines to express the sensation of flight. Samuel Barber uses tension and release throughout to create a greater sense of energy. His use of ostinatos, polytonality, dissonance, and angular lines create a work that can be described as one of Barber's most progressive works. Barber would later revise the work and state that the symphony has no programmatic intentions.

=== I. Allegro ma non troppo ===
The first movement is in simple triple time and marked Allegro ma non troppo. This movement, in sonata form, is the longest movement of the symphony lasting over twelve minutes. The movement opens with aggressive woodwind chords in seconds that move at the interval of a seventh. Then, the strings enter playing the initial theme that is based on the opening chords. Next, a second theme, based around sixteenth notes, leads into a lyrical theme from the oboe, which closes the exposition. The development begins with a contrapuntal passage that leads into a full orchestra statement based on the opening motif. The percussion section is used throughout to create diminution and augmentation of the theme.

=== II. Andante, un poco mosso ===
The second movement is in 5/4 time and marked Andante, un poco mosso. The slow movement features solos by the English horn, flute, and E♭ clarinet. The piece, which tries to emulate a flier at night, is based on a slow ostinato 5/4 rhythm that is first played by the muted cellos and basses. The English horn enters over the accompaniment to perform a "lonely" melody in 4/4 time. The juxtaposition of time signatures creates an oscillating rhythmic counterpoint that helps propel the movement forward. The second movement is the shortest movement in the work, lasting around seven minutes. The work was later revised and edited to stand alone as Night Flight, a tone poem for orchestra.

=== III. Presto, senza battuta – Allegro risoluto ===
The third movement is in fast triple time and marked Presto, senza battuta. The third movement is the most technical movement of the entire symphony. The final movement begins with a spiral figure for the strings in free rhythm that is interrupted by the brass section. This leads to a set of variations and a short fugue. The spiral section returns in the brass and also in the coda, which brings the work to an exciting finish. The final movement lasts approximately nine minutes.

== Notable recordings ==
Barber's Symphony No. 2 has been recorded by over a dozen orchestras. A 1951 recording of the 1947 revised version of Symphony No. 2 is available by the New Symphony Orchestra with Samuel Barber conducting. The monaural recording was originally released on a ten-inch LP by London Records, who reissued it in 1956 on a twelve-inch disc, coupled with the ballet suite from Medea. This coupling was again reissued in 1970 on Everest Records, and in 1965 a new pairing of the symphony with Barber's Concerto for Cello and Orchestra, conducted by Barber with the same orchestra and Zara Nelsova, cello, was issued in London on the Ace of Clubs imprint of Decca Records. More recently, this recording of the symphony was released on CD by Pavilion Records in 2001. A recording of the broadcast of the world premiere by the Boston Symphony Orchestra is held by the Motion Picture, Broadcasting, and Recorded Sound Division of the Library of Congress in Washington, D.C. This recording has been released commercially on CD by AS Disc in 1989, and by Pristine Audio in 2017 as part of Koussevitzky Conducts Barber, PASC 217.

== See also ==
- Samuel Barber
- List of compositions by Samuel Barber
