= Piano Sonata (Barber) =

1947–49 composition for piano by Samuel Barber

- by Samuel Barber
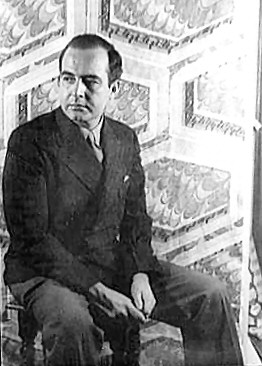
- The composer in 1944
- Key: E♭ minor
- Catalogue: Op. 26
- Genre: Classical
- Form: Sonata
- Composed: 1947–1949
- Published: 1950
- Duration: 20 minutes
- Movements: 4
- Scoring: Solo piano

Premiere
- Date: December 9, 1949
- Location: Havana, Cuba
- Performers: Vladimir Horowitz

The Piano Sonata in E♭ minor, Op. 26, is a four-movement piano sonata by the American composer Samuel Barber. Composed between 1947 and 1949, the sonata was commissioned for the twenty-fifth anniversary of the League of Composers by American songwriters Irving Berlin and Richard Rodgers. It was first performed by Vladimir Horowitz in December 1949 in Havana, Cuba. Upon its premiere, the sonata was met with immediate widespread acclaim, with The New York Times describing it as the "first sonata truly to come of age by an American composer of this period".

Barber began composing the work in September 1947, completing the first movement later that year; however, a demanding schedule slowed his progress, and Barber did not complete the sonata until June 1949. Initially, Barber envisioned a three-movement work, but feedback from Horowitz led Barber to compose a virtuosic four-voice fugue as a fourth and final movement. Horowitz premiered the sonata in Havana, Cuba, on December 9, 1949. He followed this premiere with a private performance in New York in early January 1950 attended by prominent composers including Aaron Copland and Gian Carlo Menotti. The public US premiere took place at Constitution Hall in Washington, D.C., later that month, followed by a performance at New York's Carnegie Hall on January 20.

The sonata, despite being tonally centered in E♭ minor, utilizes heavy chromaticism and modern compositional techniques such as twelve-tone technique. Structurally, the sonata adheres to a traditional four-movement design. The first movement is in sonata form and its texture integrates several twelve-tone tone rows. The second movement is in a five-part rondo form and with a tonal center of G major. The third movement, often described as a passacaglia, is tonally centered in B minor and builds its bass ostinatos from twelve-tone rows. The finale is a highly virtuosic four-voice fugue that has been considered one of the greatest examples of the fugue in the 20th century.

== History ==
In September 1947, the American songwriters Irving Berlin and Richard Rodgers, on the League of Composers' recommendation, announced a commission for a piano sonata by Barber to mark the 25th anniversary of the League. Barber began writing the sonata that month, completing the first movement by December 1947. However, Barber's progress on the sonata was interrupted by a hectic schedule that demanded his focus, including rehearsals for his ballet Medea and plans for Knoxville: Summer of 1915. Barber planned to complete his sonata during his stay at the American Academy in Rome, initially planned from February to July. The composer was wary of the academy's crowded conditions and disgruntled atmosphere but hoped to work in isolation. However, once in Rome, he found it difficult to focus. Writing to Sidney Homer, his uncle and longtime mentor, he confessed to being heavily distracted not only by the atmosphere of the city of Rome, but by the shifting social and political landscape of postwar Italy.

Barber returned to the United States early in the summer, sooner than planned, and finished the second movement in mid-August 1948. Upon completing the first two movements, Barber initially planned that a slow movement would conclude the piece. However, after Barber played the completed movements for Vladimir Horowitz, who later premiered the work, Horowitz then suggested Barber include a "very flashy last movement, but with content"; Barber subsequently added a concluding fugue after the slow movement.

The composer finished the sonata in June 1949, and Horowitz began to prepare it for performance, spending five hours a day practicing it. Barber later commented that Horowitz had been playing it "with a surprising emotional rapprochement which I had not expected". Horowitz premiered the sonata in Havana, Cuba, on December 9, 1949. This was followed by a private performance by Horowitz in New York at the former G. Schirmer headquarters on January 4, 1950. Gian Carlo Menotti, Virgil Thomson, Douglas Moore, William Schuman, Thomas Schippers, Aaron Copland, Lukas Foss, Myra Hess, and Samuel Chotzinoff all attended. The official United States premiere was in Washington, D.C., on January 11, 1950, at Constitution Hall; Horowitz then publicly played the work in New York on January 23, 1950 at Carnegie Hall. It received ubiquitous praise from music critics. By April 1950, plans were in place for Horowitz to record the sonata for a Christmas release that year; Horowitz made the recording in May, for RCA Victor. This recording remained Barber's preferred version for at least a decade.

== Structure and music ==
The sonata is in four movements, and usually takes twenty minutes to perform:

1. Allegro energico
2. Allegro vivace e leggero
3. Adagio mesto
4. Fuga: Allegro con spirito

The sonata is technically demanding; Barber, himself a pianist, said that he was unable to adequately play it, and the Music Library Association noted in 1986 that the sonata was "once considered almost too demanding a work". Structurally, the sonata adheres to traditional designs for each movement. Musicologist Hans Tischler writes that the sonata fuses modern compositional techniques such as twelve-tone technique with forms from the preceding three centuries, such as sonata form, passacaglia, and fugue. American folk idioms are included in at least the second and fourth movements of the sonata. Despite forays into twelve-tone technique, and its chromaticism and dissonance, the sonata is centered on E♭ minor. Some of the twelve-tone rows resemble examples from Nicolas Slonimsky's Thesaurus of Scales and Melodic Patterns, a book that was reportedly on Barber's piano while he was composing the sonata.

=== I. Allegro energico ===
The first movement is in sonata form and 4/4 meter. Musicologist Barbara Heyman writes that in this movement "the sonata form is more aptly delineated by melodic design than by harmonic structure". Barber worked several twelve-tone tone rows into the movement's texture. Tischler writes that in these rows, the composer prioritizes the musical motive over strict adherence to a twelve-note structure. This allows for flexibility in note repetition, omission, and grouping. According to musicologist Nathan Broder, the entire movement is based on four distinct themes, all introduced in the exposition; three of these themes are explored further in the development section.

The second section of the two-part development marks a significant shift in the overall atmosphere of the movement, which had up to this point been characterized by constant chromaticism. The section, in diatonic C minor, does not include any chromatic alterations for the first twelve measures. The recapitulation begins with a climactic restatement of the first theme, now intensified by octave doubling and richer harmonies; the very first chord of the recapitulation creates a complex dissonance by incorporating the notes of both the German and French augmented sixth chords in E♭ minor, alongside the tonic chord. Although the recapitulation is slightly condensed compared to the exposition, it still presents all major thematic groups. According to Heyman, the coda that follows is where the home key of E♭ minor is asserted for the first time in the movement.

=== II. Allegro vivace e leggero ===
The second movement is in rondo form, tonally centered in G major and in 6/8 time. The rondo is a five-part A–B–A–C–A. The movement's initial tonal framework initially suggests a G major backdrop, yet chromatic elements such as C♯ and F-natural subvert its stability. Section A introduces two primary themes, one in G major and one in the subdominant key of C major. Section B adopts a waltz-like character and is in C major. Within its distinctive atmosphere are complex syncopations, bitonalities, and blue notes. Following a return of section A, section C introduces a new theme in B♭ major, which has rhythmic and intervallic similarities to the second primary theme. The final return of the A section begins in A♭ major before abruptly pivoting back to G major, leading to a coda that cadences on a tonic triad.

=== III. Adagio mesto ===
Often described as a passacaglia, the third movement is in ternary ABA form, and Broder describes it as "the most tragic of all of Barber's slow movements". Despite its chromaticism and twelve-tone writing, the movement is tonally centered in B minor, and often throughout the movement Barber enriches chords constructed from twelve-tone rows with notes independent from the rows. The movement opens with two statements of six dyads which constitute "a vertical statement of twelve tones" and serve as the first of two twelve-tone rows that comprise the entire movement's bass ostinato. The three sections of the movement are connected by brief passages that have no relation to the twelve-note rows. Tischler notes that "the employment of the twelve-note rows in this movement is quite original and a real contribution to contemporary technique", and is a reinterpretation of the traditional passacaglia through a 20th-century lens.

Following the two statements of dyads, the ostinato is transformed to an arpeggiated form in the third measure and then repeats in the fourth measure transposed up a half-step. The next two measures—numbers five and six—are where the second twelve-tone row is introduced in arpeggiation. The melody, though highly chromatic, does not constitute a row. Section B begins with a similar introduction to that of the opening A section. This section develops the opening melody by including a variant of it in faster thirty-second notes. The return of the A section also includes added counterpoint, with fragments of the melody in canon in a middle voice.

=== IV. Fuga: Allegro con spirito ===
The fourth movement is a four-voice fugue that is very demanding to play, and it has been widely considered one of the greatest examples of the fugue in the 20th century. While conventional in structure, syncopated rhythms and "blue note" harmonies, characteristic of American jazz, are woven into the fugue's fabric. The subject resembles old Italian fugue subjects in its sectional composition; there are three distinct motives in the subject. Tischler describes the fugue as having five development sections, each separated by episodes, and concluding with a coda. After the full subject and its tonal answer are presented at the start of the piece, the entire subject henceforth reappears only twice: once in the second development section and again in stretto during the final episode. However, unlike those, Barber's subject does not distinguish between the head motive and the rest through contrasting note lengths.

The fugue's first countersubject is derived from the main theme of the first movement, and can also be divided into three motives. The first episode following the fugue's exposition includes a development of the countersubject canonically. The second episode includes fragments of both the subject and the first countersubject and includes rhythmic augmentation. The third episode, in E major, has been described by Broder as having an American folk-dance flavor, and by Tischler as "lyric relief from the dramatic drive of the rest of the movement". It develops the countersubject's first motive and presents it in augmentation and inversion. Throughout the episode, there are allusions to American Western folk music and Barber's earlier piano composition Excursions. The fugue eventually climaxes in a four-voice stretto over a dominant pedal point. The movement ends with a coda where the right hand arpeggiates a German augmented sixth chord in E♭ minor, but with an added dominant (B♭), followed by an octave passage and a forceful arrival on the tonic.

== Reception ==
Heyman stated that perhaps no other piece by Barber "has had as stunning an impact on the American musical world as his Sonata for Piano". The sonata's acclaim by music critics following its first performances was immediate. Richard Keith wrote in The Washington Post following Horowitz's January 11, 1950, Constitution Hall performance that the fugue is "one of the most musically exciting and technically brilliant pieces of writing yet turned out by an American"; Glenn Gunn of the Washington Times-Herald said "the sound of the instrument has not been exploited in a similar manner by any twentieth-century composer". Following the official New York premiere at Carnegie Hall, Olin Downes of The New York Times noted the sonata had a "prodigious success", declaring it "the first sonata really come of age by an American composer of this period."

The sonata was also praised by fellow composers, including Francis Poulenc, who wrote:

This sonata, which I had already read, gives me unrestricted pleasure. It is a remarkable work from the musical point of view as well as the instrumental. By turns pathetic, cheerful, or lyric, it ends with a fugue of fantastic difficulty. We are far from the dull, scholastic fugues of the pupils—I repeat, the pupils—of Hindemith. This sparkling finale knocks you out in some five minutes.

Gian Carlo Menotti, Barber's romantic partner, said in 1981 about the sonata: "I don't know a single piano sonata in the modern repertoire that has that strength and power." George Walker praised the fugue as "exceptional".

The sonata has also received occasional criticism, primarily from musicologists. H. Wiley Hitchcock said that he considered the sonata "uneven and dangerously flawed", saying that it had "a kind of unevenness of inspiration or level of compositional skill, a kind of contrived quality to each of the movements that attempt something in fact not quite achieved". Charles Rosen expressed a dislike for the sonata, preferring Elliott Carter's Piano Sonata, which he found "terrific".

== Notable recordings ==
The world premiere recording of the sonata was made by Vladimir Horowitz in May 1950 at New York's Town Hall for RCA Victor. It was initially released on LP later that year; the LP's other side included Horowitz's recording of Chopin's Piano Sonata No. 2 (Op. 35), a fact that delighted Barber: "anyone who wants to hear Horowitz play the funeral march [of Chopin's sonata]—and many will—will be forced to buy my sonata as well." This recording remained Barber's preference for at least ten years. A live recording of Horowitz playing the sonata at a Carnegie Hall recital on March 20, 1950, was also commercially released by Sony Classical Records. Moura Lympany performed the sonata for the first time on BBC in December 1950, a performance that Barber heard. The recording was subsequently released commercially by Decca Records. A live recording by Van Cliburn at the 1964 Salzburg Festival was released by Orfeo on CD; he subsequently made a studio recording in Rome in 1967 for RCA Victor. Marjorie Mitchell's recording of the sonata was released on Decca's Gold Label Series in 1966. Terence Judd's October 1977 live recording of the sonata from London was released on Chandos Records. John Browning's first studio recording of the sonata for Desto Records was made in 1970. Marc-André Hamelin made a studio recording of the sonata for Hyperion Records, which was released in 2004. Joel Fan's recording of the sonata was released in April 2009 by Reference Recordings. Leon McCawley also recorded the sonata in January 2010 for Warner Classics. The sonata was also recorded in 2017 by Kenneth Broberg for Decca Gold, in 2021 by Isata Kanneh-Mason for Decca Records, and in 2024 by Claire Huangci for Alpha Records.

== See also ==
- List of compositions by Samuel Barber
