= Raya Garbousova =

Russian-born American cellist and teacher (1909–1997)

Raya Garbousova Рая Гарбузова

Background information
- Born: September 25, 1909 (disputed); Tiflis, Tiflis Governorate, Russian Empire
- Died: January 28, 1997 (aged 87) DeKalb, Illinois, U.S.
- Occupation: Cellist
- Years active: 1923–1997

Raya Garbousova (Russian: Ра́я Га́рбузова; September 25, 1909 – January 28, 1997) was a Russian-born American cellist and teacher.

== Early life and career ==
Born in Tiflis, into a Jewish family. According to the biography contained in the program booklet for the 1997 memorial concert in her honor in DeKalb, Illinois, she made her formal debut in Moscow in 1923 and left the Soviet Union in 1925. She lived and performed in Europe, and gave her first performance in New York City in 1935. In December 1938, she toured the UK as supporting artist to Richard Tauber. She emigrated to the United States in 1939.

In 1948, she married cardiologist Kurt Biss and settled in DeKalb, Illinois. She taught at Northern Illinois University from 1973 until her retirement in 1991. Besides teaching at NIU, Garbousova also taught at the Hartt College of Music in Hartford, Connecticut, and gave many master classes at prominent musical institutions. They raised two sons, Gregory Biss (born 1942) and Paul Biss (born 1944). Gregory is a pianist and composer. Paul is a violinist and violist who is married to violinist Miriam Fried; one of their children, Jonathan Biss, is a classical pianist.

During her performing career, she performed with many of the world's leading orchestras and conductors. To many who knew her, she was particularly associated with the cello music of Samuel Barber. Barber wrote his cello concerto for her, and she performed its world premiere with Serge Koussevitzky and the Boston Symphony Orchestra in 1946. Her recording of the Barber Sonata for Cello and Piano is also well known in this context.

For her students, in addition to providing the typical technical and musical instruction which master teachers provide, she added the perspective of having personally known many of the great composers and string soloists of the twentieth century.

== Legacy ==
In the booklet of letters and biographies which was distributed privately to participants in the 1997 Memorial Concert for Raya Garbousova, Mstislav Rostropovich stated, "For me, Raya was my closest, dearest friend." In this same document, János Starker stated, "But play she did and on a level of artistry that earned her a place among the handful of truly greats of the century."

== Partial discography ==
- Samuel Barber: Concerto for Cello & Orchestra (Decca Records LP, DL 10132, 1966)
