= Cello Concerto (Barber) =

1945 Cello concerto composed by Samuel Barber

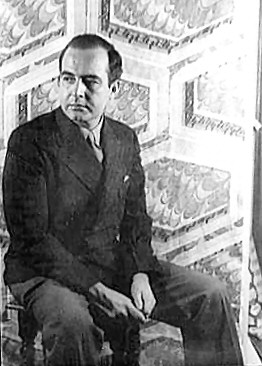
Samuel Barber in 1944

Samuel Barber's Cello Concerto, Op. 22, completed on 27 November 1945, was the second of his three concertos (the first being his Violin Concerto and the third his Piano Concerto). The concerto won Barber the New York Music Critics' Circle Award in 1947.

== Background ==
Barber was commissioned to write his cello concerto for Raya Garbousova, an expatriate Russian cellist, by Serge Koussevitzky on behalf of Garbusova and the Boston Symphony Orchestra. Funds for the commission were supplied, however, by John Nicholas Brown, an amateur cellist and a trustee of the Boston Symphony Orchestra. The score is dedicated to John and Anne Brown.

Barber was still on active duty with the U. S. Army at the time he received the commission, and before beginning work, he asked Garbousova to play through her repertoire for him so that he could understand her particular performing style and the resources of the instrument. Garbousova premiered it with the Boston Symphony Orchestra in Symphony Hall, Boston, on 5 April 1946, followed by New York performances at the Brooklyn Academy of Music on 12 and 13 April.

The work has remained relatively obscure and performances are scarce, largely because of its extreme technical demands, but also because the heavy editing of the solo part by Garbousova hinders individual interpretation.

== Music ==
The work has three movements:

1. Allegro moderato
2. Andante sostenuto
3. Molto allegro e appassionato

The concerto is scored for solo cello and an orchestra consisting of two flutes, oboe, English horn, two clarinets (second doubling bass clarinet), two bassoons, two horns, three trumpets, timpani, snare drum, and strings.
