= Music for a Scene from Shelley =

Tone poem by Samuel Barber

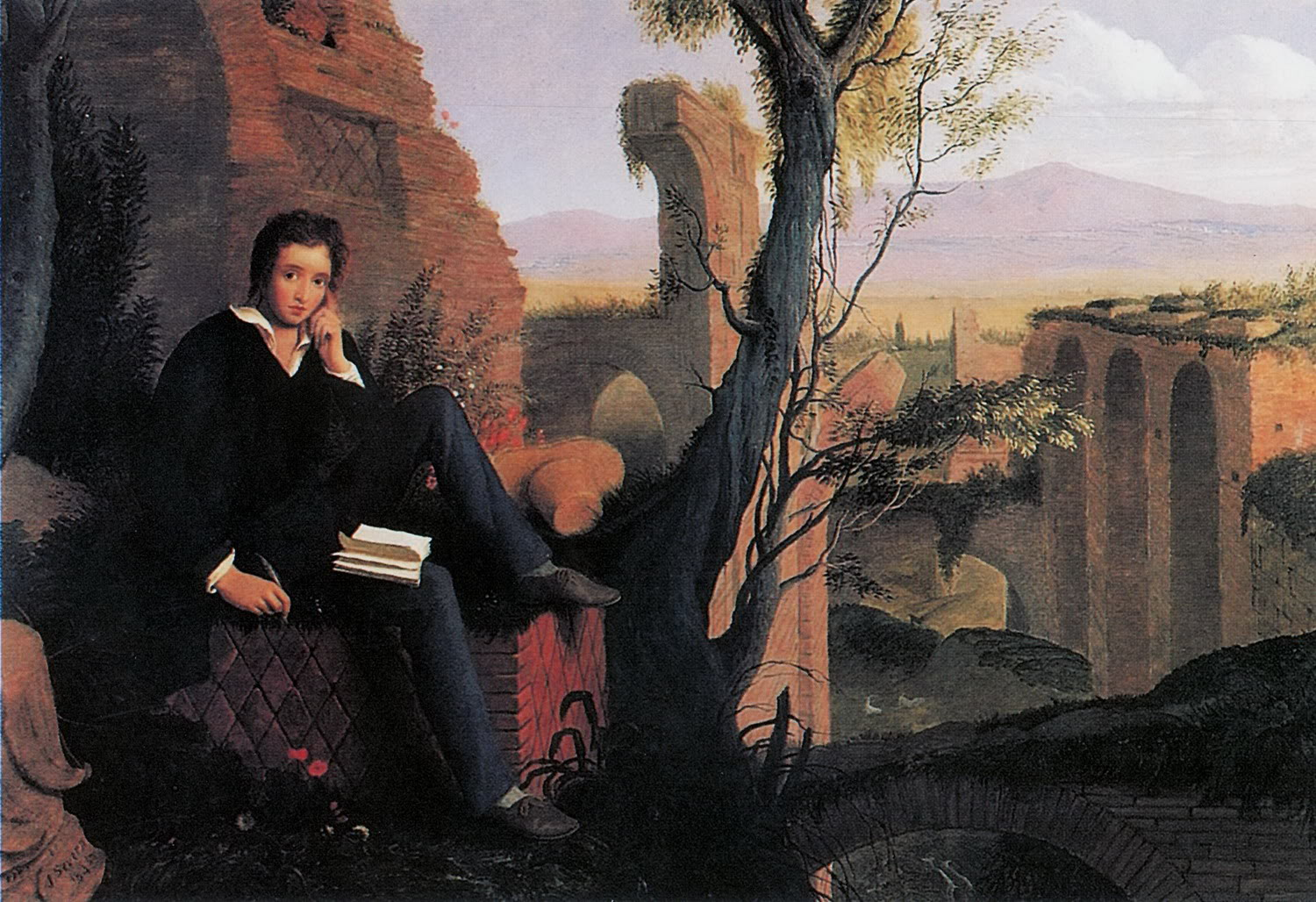
Shelly writing Prometheus Unbound, oil on canvas by Joseph Severn, Keats–Shelley Memorial House, Rome.

Music for a Scene from Shelley, Op. 7, is a tone poem composed by Samuel Barber in 1933.

== History ==
Barber composed Music for a Scene from Shelley during a visit to Italy in the summer of 1933. It was inspired in part by the view of Lake Lugano and the Swiss Alps from Cadegliano, where Barber was staying with Gian Carlo Menotti at his family's villa. It is the only one of Barber's compositions that owes its origin to the influence of a place. However, it is also based on and owes its title to lines from act 2, scene 5 of Percy Bysshe Shelley's Prometheus Unbound, in which Panthea prompts her sister Asia (goddess of love) to hear "voices in the air", seeking Asia's sympathy and love.

The work was premiered in Carnegie Hall in New York, on March 24, 1935, by the New York Philharmonic-Symphony Orchestra, conducted by Werner Janssen. Further performances quickly followed, in Europe as well as the United States, though it has never achieved the popularity of some of Barber’s other early orchestral works.

In 1935, Barber was awarded the Prix de Rome of the American Academy in Rome together with a Pulitzer travelling award, for this composition and the Sonata for Cello and Piano. The Rome Prize, announced on NBC Radio on May 9 as part of a broadcast concert of his music including both works, enabled him to return to Italy where he would compose his First Symphony.

== Analysis ==
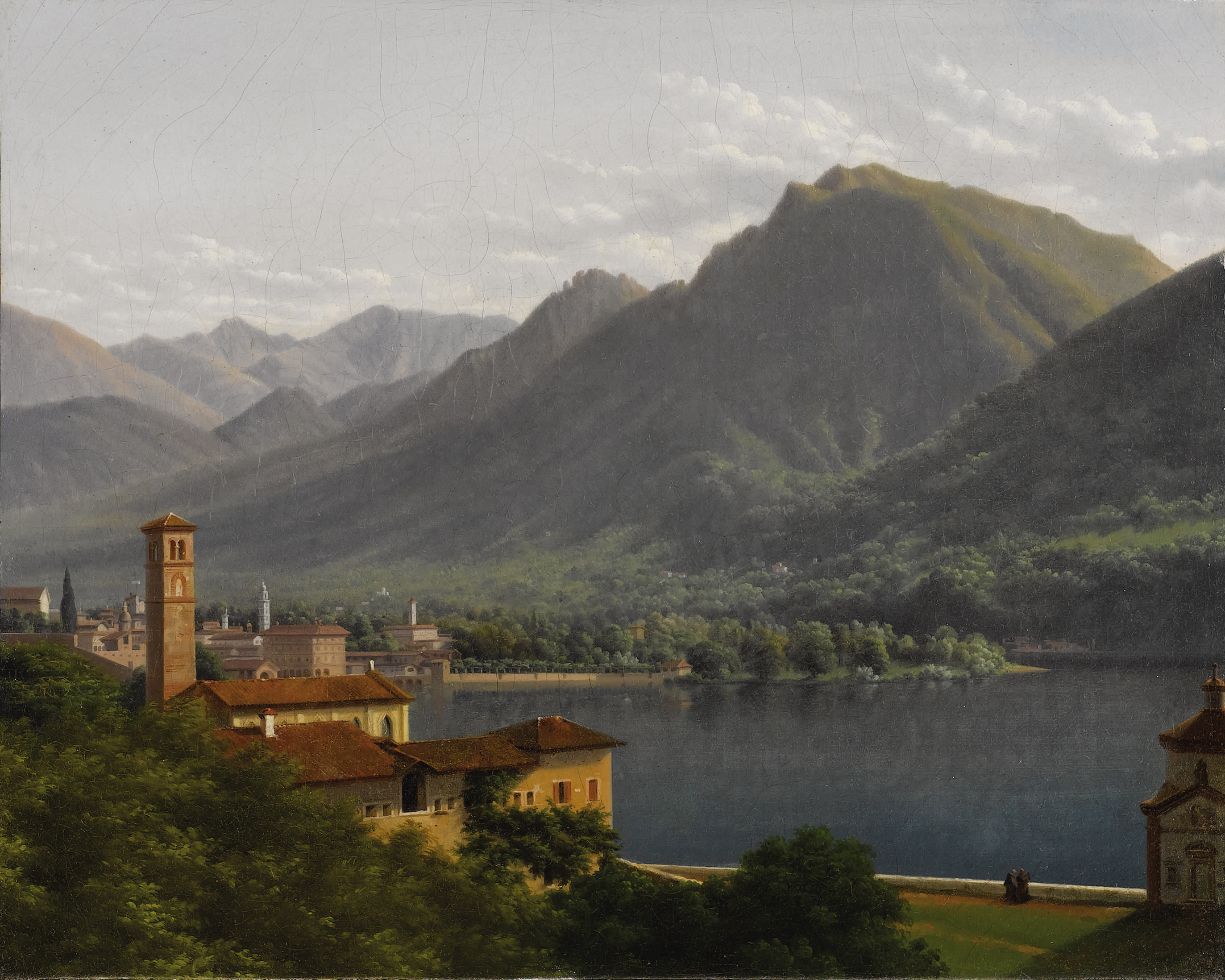
Lake Lugano, oil on canvas by Lancelot-Théodore Turpin de Crissé

The form of Music for a Scene from Shelley is disputed. It has been described as an arch form, but this has been rejected as inappropriate, with an alternative proposal of an AB form with coda.

Despite the declared literary program, the character of the music paints a mood of Gothic mystery. The opening motif of four descending notes, heard against a backdrop of an undulating murmur, is subjected to little true development. Instead, it is repeated a number of times with different orchestrations and textures with gradually increasing dynamic levels. New material is then introduced, and the work "builds to a blood-curdling climax before subsiding". More than forty years later, in 1977, Barber would return to this same four-note descending motif in the Ballade for solo piano where, just as in the Music for a Scene from Shelley, it is simply reiterated, rather than being developed.
