= Piano Concerto (Barber) =

1962 concerto by Samuel Barber

The Piano Concerto, Op. 38, by Samuel Barber was commissioned by the music publishing company G. Schirmer in honor of the centenary of their founding. The piano concerto was premiered on September 24, 1962, in the opening festivities of Philharmonic Hall, now David Geffen Hall, the first hall built at Lincoln Center in Manhattan, with John Browning as soloist with the Boston Symphony Orchestra conducted by Erich Leinsdorf.

== History ==
Barber began work on the concerto in March 1960. John Browning was the intended soloist from the outset and the concerto was written with his specific keyboard technique in mind. The first two movements were completed before the end of 1960 but the last movement was not completed until 15 days before the world premiere performance. According to Browning (in the liner notes for his 1991 RCA Victor recording of the Concerto with the St. Louis Symphony), the initial version of the piano part of the third movement was unplayable at performance tempo; Barber resisted reworking the piano part until Vladimir Horowitz reviewed it and also deemed it unplayable at full tempo. The work was met with great critical acclaim with Barber winning his second Pulitzer Prize in 1963 and the Music Critics Circle Award in 1964.

Browning recorded the work for Columbia Records in 1964 with the Cleveland Orchestra conducted by George Szell. These artists also performed it live in 1965 while on tour in Europe. He re-recorded the Concerto in 1990 for RCA Victor with the St. Louis Symphony Orchestra conducted by Leonard Slatkin. Other recordings include Abbott Ruskin for Vox/Turnabout in 1976 with the MIT Symphony Orchestra conducted by David Epstein, a Naxos release performed by Stephen Prutsman with the Royal Scottish National Orchestra under Marin Alsop, a performance by Tedd Joselson with the London Symphony Orchestra directed by Andrew Schenck on the ASV label and a recording for Telarc played by Jon Kimura Parker with the Atlanta Symphony Orchestra conducted by Yoel Levi.

== Music ==
=== Scoring ===
The work is scored for piano solo and an orchestra of piccolo, 2 flutes, 2 oboes, cor anglais, 2 clarinets, bass clarinet, 2 bassoons, 4 horns, 3 trumpets, 3 trombones, timpani, percussion, harp and strings.

=== Movements ===
The work is in three movements:

1. Allegro appassionato
2. Canzone: Moderato
3. Allegro molto

==== I. Allegro appassionato ====
The first movement opens with a piano declamation of one of the major themes, and then moves into a furious tutti section. This opening section contains the expression of the movement's chief melodies. Through inversion, retrograde, and counterpoint variations of these melodies (which will appear in later movements), Barber spins out the entire movement. It begins (after a tonally ambiguous introduction) and ends in E minor.

==== II. Canzone: Moderato ====
The second movement, predominantly in C♯ minor, is based primarily on one sweet but sad melody and is far more subdued than the first movement. This movement was transcribed and expanded from an Elegy for flute and piano, composed in 1959 for the flautist Manfred Ibel. It was published in 1962, as Canzone (Elegy), Op. 38a.

==== III. Allegro molto ====
The third movement, mostly in B♭ minor, is in a furiously fast 5/8 time, with a pounding ostinato. It makes heavy use of the brass instruments, and is driven by the recapitulation of a brief motivic theme, giving the movement a modified rondo form.

== See also ==
- List of compositions by Samuel Barber
