= Cello Sonata (Barber) =

1932 composition by Samuel Barber

The Sonata for Violoncello and Piano, Op. 6, by Samuel Barber is a sonata for cello and piano. It is in the key of C minor.

== History ==
The sonata was composed between June and December 1932 during a trip to Europe as Barber was finishing his studies at the Curtis Institute of Music. The score is dedicated to Barber's composition teacher, Rosario Scalero, and was officially premiered on 5 March 1933 with the composer at the piano and his friend and colleague Orlando Cole as cellist, at a concert of the League of Composers in New York City. Together with the Music for a Scene from Shelley, Op. 7, this sonata won both a Pulitzer travel stipend and the Rome Prize of the American Academy in Rome in 1937.

== Analysis ==
The Cello Sonata, Opus 6, is a chamber piece. A romantic piece in a clear C minor, it is a profound and passionate cello sonata reminiscent of the examples of Brahms and Hans Pfitzner.

The sonata is in three movements:

1. Allegro ma non troppo
2. Adagio (in combination with a scherzo)
3. Allegro appassionato
