= Rosario Scalero =

Italian composer

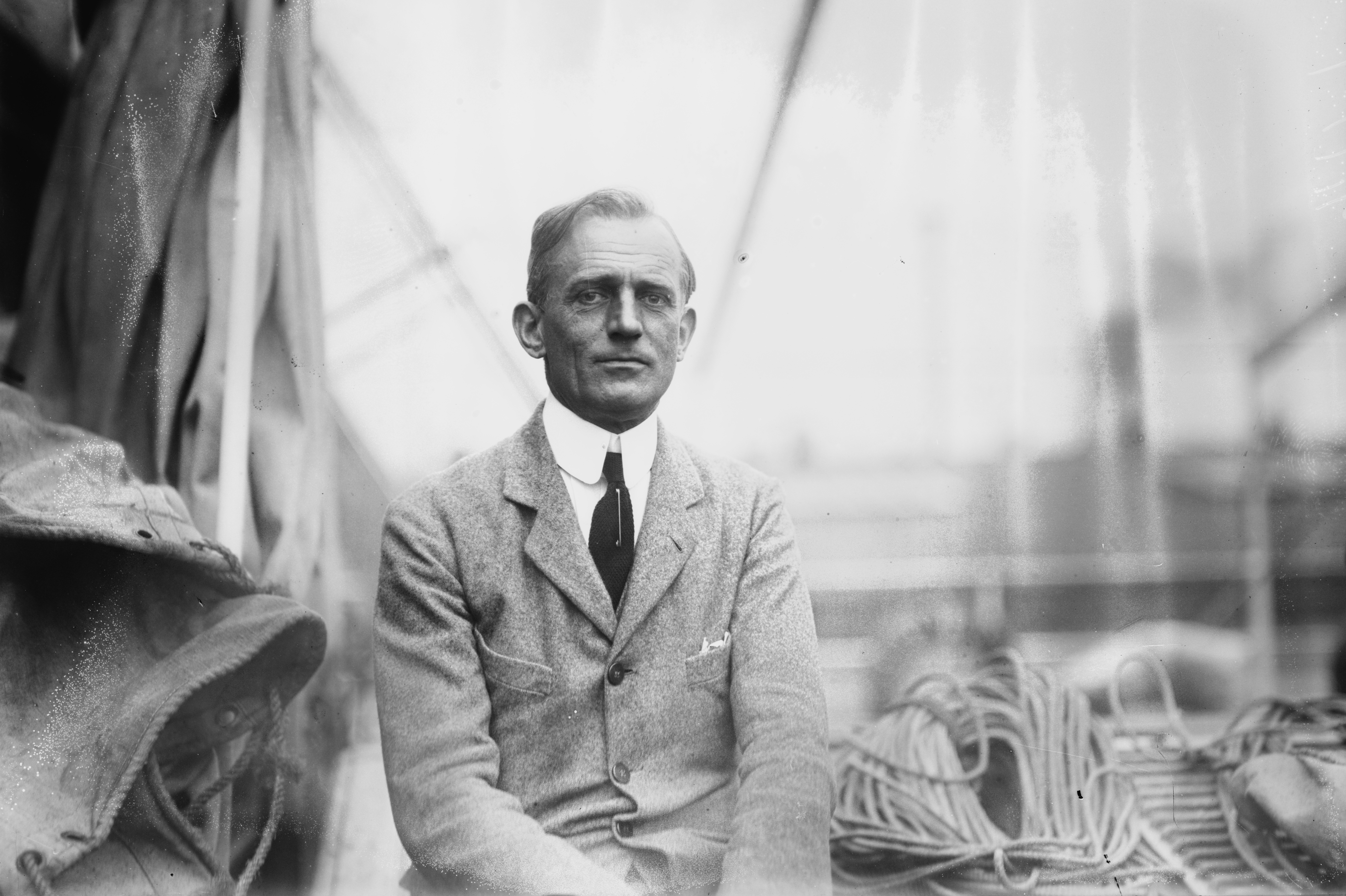
Rosario Scalero, c. 1919

Natale Rosario Scalero (24 December 1870 in Moncalieri – 25 December 1954 in Montestrutto) was an Italian violinist, music teacher and composer.

== Life and career ==
By the age of six, Scalero was under the tutelage of Pietro Bertazzi, a violinist, musical instrument maker and instructor at the Conservatorio St. Cecilia in Rome. In 1881, Scalero entered the Liceo Musicale di Torino under Luigi Avalle. At the age of 15, Scalero began studies with César Thomson. Scalero appears to have returned to his home at Moncalieri for a time for health reasons, before returning to Turin to study with Camillo Sivori through 1889, appearing during this time with the Sivori Quartet.

In 1891, Scalero made his debut as a recitalist in Leipzig, following which he performed in Milan, Rome, London, and throughout Europe to critical acclaim. In 1895, Scalero went to London to study and assist violinist August Wilhelmj (concertmaster of the world premiere of Wagner's Ring of the Nibelungs in Bayreuth). In 1900 he left London for Vienna, where he became a composition student of Eusebius Mandyczewski.

In 1907, Scalero returned to Rome. Here he joined in 1913 the Società del Quartetto and became its musical director and first violinist. In 1919, he succeeded Ernest Bloch as a composition teacher at the Mannes School of Music in New York. After 1927, he taught at the famous Curtis Institute of Music in Philadelphia, while apparently keeping a residence in Gressoney. Among his most successful students at Curtis were composers Samuel Barber, Jeanne Behrend, Nino Rota, Gian Carlo Menotti and George Walker. During that time he also taught Marc Blitzstein, Berenice Robinson and Mary Watson Weaver. In 1946 he returned to Montestrutto, near Ivrea, where he died in 1954.

== Works ==
- A Suite for String Quartet and String Orchestra
- La Divina Foresta, symphonic poem for large orchestra
- Violin Sonata (Op.12, D minor, published 1910)
