= John Browning (pianist) =

American pianist (1933–2003)

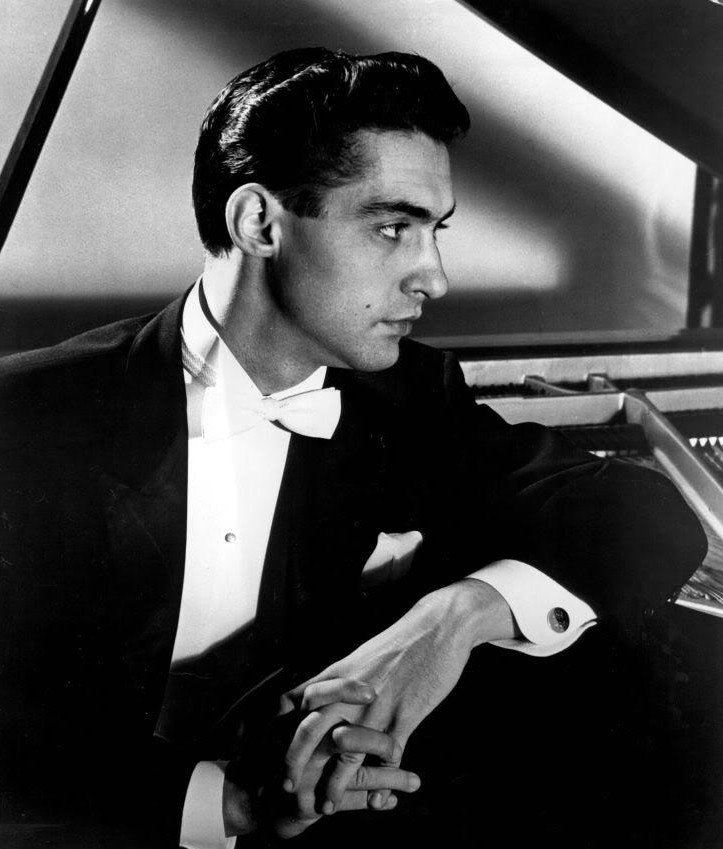
- Browning in 1966

Background information
- Born: May 23, 1933; Denver, Colorado, U.S.
- Died: January 26, 2003 (aged 69) Sister Bay, Wisconsin, U.S.
- Education: Occidental College; Juilliard School
- Genre: Classical music
- Occupation: Pianist
- Instruments: Piano

John S. Browning Jr. (May 23, 1933 – January 26, 2003) was an American pianist known for his reserved, elegant style and sophisticated interpretations of Bach and Scarlatti and for his collaboration with the American composer Samuel Barber.

== Biography ==
Browning's grave at Saint Rosalia Cemetery

Browning was born to musical parents in Denver, Colorado, in 1933. He studied piano from the age of three with his mother and, at the age of 10, was accepted as a student by Rosina Lhévinne. He appeared as a soloist with the Denver Symphony Orchestra later that same year.

In 1945, his family moved to Los Angeles, California. He spent two years at Occidental College there. He began his studies at the Juilliard School in New York City with Rosina Lhévinne in 1950. He won the Leventritt Competition in 1955 and made his professional orchestral debut with the New York Philharmonic in 1956. At this point his career came under the management of well known talent manager Herbert Barrett, later signing with Columbia Artists Management Inc. in the early 1990s.

As early as 1960, Browning had already emerged as a featured soloist in the prime-time CBS Television network special Spring Festival of Music. His appearance with the conductor Alfredo Antonini and the Symphony of the Air featured a virtuoso performance of Sergei Rachmaninoff's Second Piano Concerto, which was noted for its musical excellence and its imaginative visual presentation on television.

In 1962, he gave the premiere of Samuel Barber's Pulitzer Prize-winning Piano Concerto, which was written for him, in connection with the opening of Lincoln Center. He subsequently made a commercial recording of the work for Columbia with George Szell conducting the Cleveland Orchestra. His second recording of the work, with Leonard Slatkin and the St. Louis Symphony Orchestra in 1991 for RCA Victor, won a Grammy Award for best instrumental soloist with orchestra. In 1993, Browning won a second Grammy Award for best instrumental soloist without orchestra for a disc of Barber's solo works on MusicMasters. He continued to follow the works of contemporary American composers but found relatively few to his liking.

Browning developed a busy career, giving some 100 concerts a season. He eased his schedule in the 1970s, explaining later that he had grown ragged from overwork. In the 1990s, his career had something of a renaissance. His last public appearance was at the National Gallery of Art in Washington in April 2002. He also taught and gave master classes at the Manhattan School of Music and the Juilliard School in New York City.

His last performance of all was to an invited audience at the United States Supreme Court in May 2002. He died (from heart failure) at the age of 69 some eight months later in Sister Bay, Wisconsin, and was buried there at Saint Rosalia Cemetery.

== Legacy ==
John Browning is remembered for his penetrating, intellectual interpretations of Bach, Haydn, Mozart, and Scarlatti, among others, and for his many recordings of the works of these and other composers. Browning recorded for RCA Victor, Columbia Records, Capitol Records, Delos Productions and MusicMasters Records. He can be seen and heard rehearsing a Brahms piano trio with Pinchas Zukerman and Ko Iwasaki, as well as chatting (in German) with Sviatoslav Richter, in the documentary Spoleto 1967.
