= Medea's Dance of Vengeance =

Orchestral composition by Samuel Barber

Medea's Dance of Vengeance is a composition (1955, Op. 23a) by the American composer Samuel Barber, derived from his earlier ballet suite Medea and loosely based on the play Medea by Euripides. Barber first created a seven-movement concert suite from this ballet (Medea, Op. 23), and five years later reduced this concert suite down to a single-movement concert piece using what he felt to be the strongest portions of the work. He originally titled it Medea's Meditation and Dance of Vengeance, but shortly before his death, he changed the title to simply Medea's Dance of Vengeance.

The work was premiered on February 2, 1956, by the New York Philharmonic under the baton of Dimitri Mitropoulos. The concert suite was recorded by a Decca studio ensemble, the New Symphony Orchestra, conducted by Barber in 1950.

== Instrumentation ==
Dance of Vengeance is scored for a larger orchestra than either preceding version (ballet or concert suite), being

Woodwinds

3 flutes (3rd doubling piccolo)
2 oboes
English horn
clarinet in E♭
2 clarinets in B♭ (and A)
bass clarinet
2 bassoons
contrabassoon

Brass

4 horns in F
3 trumpets in C
3 trombones
tuba

Percussion

timpani
triangle
cymbals
side drum (without snares)
tom-tom
bass Drum
tam-tam
whip
xylophone

Keyboards

piano

Strings

harp

violins I
violins II
violas
cellos
double basses
