= Prayers of Kierkegaard =

Cantata by Samuel Barber

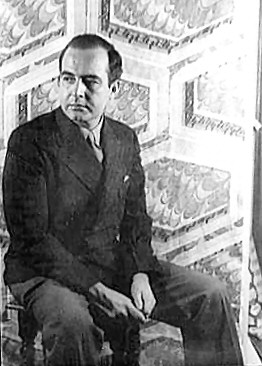
Samuel Barber in 1944

Prayers of Kierkegaard, Op. 30, is an extended one-movement cantata written by Samuel Barber between 1942 and 1954. The piece has four main subdivisions and is based on prayers by Søren Kierkegaard. It is written for chorus, large orchestra, soprano solo and incidental tenor and alto solos.

== Origins ==
Samuel Barber began writing the Prayers of Kierkegaard with the commission of the Koussevitzky Music Foundation in 1942, but because of World War II and other interruptions, only completed the work 12 years later. It was premiered on December 3, 1954 by the Boston Symphony Orchestra, the Cecilia Society Chorus, and soprano Leontyne Price, with Charles Munch conducting.

== Historical significance ==
Samuel Barber chose a selection of prayers by philosopher and theologian Søren Kierkegaard derived from his Journals as well as his books The Unchangeableness of God and Christian Discourses. These works were harsh discourses of the vague practices of the Danish church, and were a direct reflection of Barber's orthodox Presbyterian-Quaker background. In direct correlation with his Hermit Songs (1953), Barber began to use sacred texts to show the realistic but extremely hopeful outlook of American Christianity, especially the Protestantism of this period. Barber once said when speaking about the piece, "One finds here three basic truths: imagination, dialectic, and religious melancholy. The truth Søren Kierkegaard sought after was a truth which was a truth for me."

== Musical significance ==
Prayers of Kierkegaard is an unequivocal religious statement that Samuel Barber divided into four distinct parts, each representing a different prayer. The first section speaks of “God the Unchangeable” and begins in an unaccompanied chant performed by unaccompanied male voices in a Gregorian chant style. It then continues with the orchestra responding to the chant in imitative counterpoint until the chorus and orchestra join in climax on the words "Thou Art Unchanging", repeating the theme of the text.

In the second section, which is recited in the first person, the soprano solo receives the melody from an oboe solo. This minimalism, however, is changed in the third section that reflects Russian chorus writing in the thickness of the lines. This prayer grows in both the chorus and the orchestra, until it expands into a dance which ends with the sempre forte "Father In Heaven" by the chorus.

This is one of Samuel Barber's most personal works and "the prayers Barber chose to set were taken from Kierkegaard’s journals and sermons, and reflect both Kierkegaard’s and Barber’s belief in the power of God’s redemption through affirmative human deeds and personal self-awareness."
