= Samuel Barber =

American composer (1910–1981)

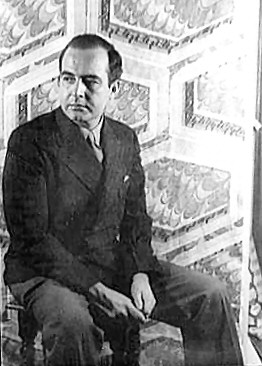
- Born: March 9, 1910; West Chester, Pennsylvania, US
- Died: January 23, 1981 (aged 70); New York City, US
- Occupations: Composer; conductor
- Works: List of compositions
- Partner: Gian Carlo Menotti
- Awards: Joseph H. Bearns Prize

Signature
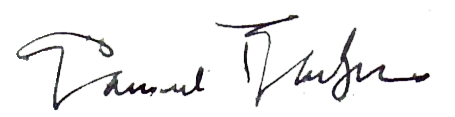

Samuel Osmond Barber II (March 9, 1910 – January 23, 1981) was an American composer, pianist, conductor, baritone, and music educator, and one of the most celebrated composers of the mid-20th century. Principally influenced by nine years' composition studies with Rosario Scalero at the Curtis Institute and more than 25 years' study with his uncle, the composer Sidney Homer, Barber's music usually eschewed the experimental trends of musical modernism in favor of traditional 19th-century harmonic language and formal structure embracing lyricism and emotional expression. However, he adopted elements of modernism after 1940 in some of his compositions, such as an increased use of dissonance and chromaticism in the Cello Concerto (1945) and Medea's Dance of Vengeance (1955); and the use of tonal ambiguity and a narrow use of serialism in his Piano Sonata (1949), Prayers of Kierkegaard (1954), and Nocturne (1959).

Barber was adept at both instrumental and vocal music. His works became successful on the international stage and many of his compositions enjoyed rapid adoption into the classical performance canon. In particular, his Adagio for Strings (1936) has earned a permanent place in the orchestral concert repertory, as has that work's adaptation for chorus, Agnus Dei (1967). He received the Pulitzer Prize for Music twice: for his opera Vanessa (1956–1957), and for the Concerto for Piano and Orchestra (1962). Also widely performed is his Knoxville: Summer of 1915 (1947), a setting for soprano and orchestra of a prose text by James Agee. At the time of Barber's death, nearly all of his compositions had been recorded. Many of his compositions were commissioned or first performed by such noted groups and artists as the Boston Symphony Orchestra, the Philadelphia Orchestra, the New York Philharmonic, the Metropolitan Opera, Vladimir Horowitz, Eleanor Steber, Raya Garbousova, John Browning, Leontyne Price, Pierre Bernac, Francis Poulenc, and Dietrich Fischer-Dieskau.

While Barber composed a significant body of purely instrumental music, two-thirds of his compositional output were art songs for voice and piano, choral music, and songs for voice and orchestra. Some of his most frequently performed songs include both the solo voice and choral versions of Sure on this shining night (solo version from 1938 and choral version from 1961) with text by Agee, and the song cycle Hermit Songs (1953), with anonymous texts by Irish monks from the eighth through the thirteenth centuries. This emphasis on sung material was rooted in his own brief career as a professional baritone in his 20s which inspired a lifelong love of vocal music. In 1935, Barber recorded his own setting of Arnold's "Dover Beach" for NBC, singing the vocal part accompanied by string quartet, and he was also featured weekly on NBC Radio in 1935–1936 performing German lieder and art songs. He also occasionally conducted performances and recordings of his works with symphony orchestras during the 1950s, and taught composition at the Curtis Institute from 1939 to 1942.

== Biography ==
=== Childhood (1910–1923) ===
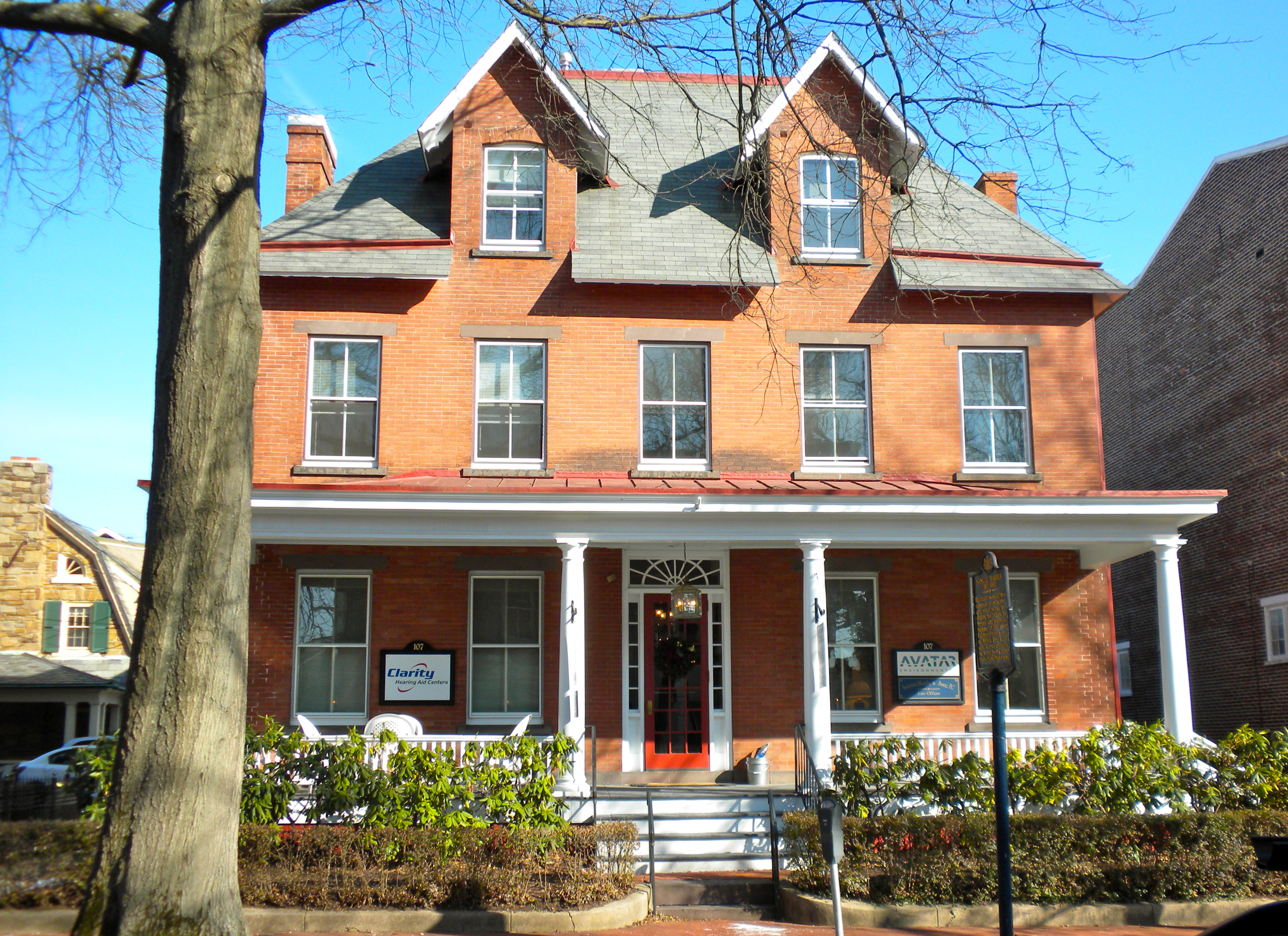
Childhood home of Samuel Barber in West Chester, Pennsylvania

Barber was born in West Chester, Pennsylvania, the son of Marguerite McLeod (née Beatty) and Samuel Le Roy Barber. He was born into a distinguished American family. His father was a physician; his mother was a pianist of English-Scottish-Irish descent whose family had lived in the United States since the time of the American Revolutionary War. His maternal aunt, Louise Homer, was a leading contralto at the Metropolitan Opera; his uncle, Sidney Homer, was a composer of American art songs. Louise Homer is known to have influenced Barber's interest in voice. Through his aunt, Barber was introduced to many great singers and songs. Sidney Homer mentored Barber for more than 25 years, and profoundly influenced his compositional aesthetics.

A child prodigy, Barber began studying the piano at the age of six and at age seven composed his first work, Sadness, a 23-measure solo piano piece in C minor. Despite Barber's profound interest in music, his family wanted him to become a typical extroverted, athletic American boy. In particular, they encouraged his playing football. However, Barber was in no way a typical boy, and at the age of nine he wrote to his mother:

Dear Mother: I have written this to tell you my worrying secret. Now don't cry when you read it because it is neither yours nor my fault. I suppose I will have to tell it now without any nonsense. To begin with, I was not meant to be an athlet [sic]. I was meant to be a composer, and will be I'm sure. I'll ask you one more thing.—Don't ask me to try to forget this unpleasant thing and go play football.—Please—Sometimes I've been worrying about this so much that it makes me mad (not very).

At the age of 10, Barber wrote his first operetta, The Rose Tree, to a libretto by the family's cook. At the age of 12, he became an organist at a local church.

=== Education and early career (1924–1941) ===
As a young boy, Barber took private lessons from William Hatton Green. Constant Vauclain, one of Barber's peers, described Green being one of Barber's greatest early influences. At the age of 14, Barber entered the youth artist program at the Curtis Institute of Music in Philadelphia, where he ultimately spent ten years developing his talents as a triple prodigy in composition, voice, and piano. During his initial studies at Curtis, he simultaneously attended and graduated from West Chester High School (later West Chester Henderson High School), during which time he composed the school's song, Alma Mater, which remains in use. Following his graduation from high school in 1928, he entered the adult professional program at Curtis from which he graduated in 1934. At Curtis he studied piano with George Frederick Boyle and Isabelle Vengerova, composition with Rosario Scalero, conducting with Fritz Reiner, and voice with Emilio de Gogorza. In 1928, he met fellow Curtis schoolmate Gian Carlo Menotti, who became his partner in life as well as in their shared profession. During his last year at Curtis he became a favorite of the conservatory's founder, Mary Louise Curtis Bok. It was through Mrs. Bok that Barber was introduced to his lifelong publishers, the Schirmer family.

From his early adulthood, Barber wrote a flurry of successful compositions, launching him into the spotlight of the classical music world. According to Walter Simmons, Barber's earlier compositions contain certain characteristics that directly relate to the "childhood" period of his composition, extending to 1942. The use of tonal harmony, unresolved dissonance, moderate chromaticism, and largely diatonic, lyrical melodies are some of the defining features of this period in his compositional career. At the age of 18, he won the Joseph H. Bearns Prize from Columbia University for his violin sonata (since lost or destroyed by the composer). He won the Bearns Prize a second time for his first large-scale orchestral work, an overture to The School for Scandal, which was composed in 1931 when he was 21 years old. It premiered successfully two years later in a performance given by the Philadelphia Orchestra under the direction of conductor Alexander Smallens.

While a student at Curtis, Barber also pursued other music development opportunities as well as personal interests through travels in Europe; mainly in the summer months when school was not in session but also sometimes for longer periods. His first European trip began in the summer of 1928 in which he visited Paris, Brittany, and Italy with cellist and composer David Freed (musician). He continued to travel in Europe in the fall of 1928 without Freed to other European cities in Czechoslovakia, Germany, Switzerland, and Austria; during which time he first visited the city of Vienna which would later become an important city in his musical development. During this first stay in Vienna in 1928 he formed a friendship with composer George Antheil.

Barber returned to Italy in the summer of 1929 using funds he received upon winning the Bearns Prize; this time with Menotti as his travel companion. He returned to Paris in the summer of 1930, and in the summers of 1931 and 1933 both Barber and Menotti studied composition with Rosario Scalero in Montestrutto, Turin while staying with Menotti's parents in Cadegliano. After winning the Bearns Prize a second time in April 1933, he extended his stay in Europe beyond the summer of that year to pursue further studies in Vienna; staying in that city in the autumn of 1933 into the early part of 1934. During this period his studies were mainly focused on developing his talents as a vocalist with the intent of pursuing a career as a baritone. He also studied conducting independently during this period; making his professional conducting debut in Vienna on January 4, 1934. In March 1934 he returned to Philadelphia to finish his studies at Curtis.

After graduating from Curtis in the spring of 1934, Barber pursued further studies in conducting and singing with John Braun in Vienna in the summers of 1935 and 1936 through the aid of a Pulitzer traveling scholarship. He soon after was awarded the Rome Prize which enabled him to pursue further studies at the American Academy in Rome from 1935 to 1937. He was awarded a Guggenheim Fellowship in 1946 and also studied conducting privately with George Szell.

In his early career Barber had a brief career as a professional baritone, performing on the NBC Music Guild concert series and earning a weekly contract on NBC radio in 1935. Musicologist Barbara Heyman wrote that Barber's recording of his own setting of Arnold's "Dover Beach" was hailed as having "singular charm and beauty, intelligently sung by a naturally beautiful voice". First-hand experience as a singer and an intuitive empathy with the voice would find expression in the large legacy of songs that occupy some two-thirds of his output.

Barber's first orchestral work to receive international attention was his Symphony in One Movement which he wrote while studying composition in Rome. The work was premiered by the Orchestra dell'Accademia Nazionale di Santa Cecilia in Rome under the baton of Bernardino Molinari in December 1936, and was soon after programmed by symphony orchestras in New York City and Cleveland. The work was the first symphonic composition created by an American to appear at the Salzburg Festival, where it was performed in 1937.

In 1938, when Barber was 28, his Adagio for Strings was performed by the NBC Symphony Orchestra under the direction of Arturo Toscanini, along with his first Essay for Orchestra. The Adagio had been arranged from the slow movement of Barber's String Quartet, Op. 11. Toscanini had rarely performed music by American composers before (an exception was Howard Hanson's Symphony No. 2, which he conducted in 1933). At the end of the first rehearsal of the piece, Toscanini remarked, "Semplice e bella" (simple and beautiful). From 1939 to 1942, Barber taught composition at the Curtis Institute in Philadelphia.

During this time, there was a major turning point in Barber's music. In 1940, he wrote a choral piece using Stephen Spender's war poem, "A Stopwatch and an Ordnance Map". From this point forward, World War II caused his second phase of composing. This new phase was greatly influenced by other composers such as Stravinsky, Schoenberg, Bartók, and genres such as jazz. His new era of composition would feature a greater involvement in American literature and culture.

=== Mid career (1942–1966) ===
In 1942, after the US entered World War II, Barber joined the Army Air Corps where he remained in service through 1945. Barber's first work after his military induction was the "Commando March" (1943), which was his only work for a concert band. It was premièred by the Army Air Forces Technical Training Command Band in Atlantic City on May 23, 1943. Sergei Koussevitzky commissioned an orchestral version for performance by the Boston Symphony that same year.

While in the Army Air Corps Barber was commissioned to write several works for the Boston Symphony Orchestra (BSO), including his Cello Concerto for Raya Garbousova and his Second Symphony, a work he later suppressed. Composed in 1943, the symphony was originally titled Symphony Dedicated to the Air Forces and was premiered in early 1944 by Serge Koussevitzky and the BSO. Barber revised the symphony in 1947 and it was subsequently published by G. Schirmer in 1950 and recorded the following year by the New Symphony Orchestra of London, conducted by Barber himself. According to some sources, Barber destroyed the score in 1964. Hans Heinsheimer was an eyewitness, and reported that he accompanied Barber to the publisher's office where they collected all the music from the library, and Barber "tore up all these beautifully and expensively copied materials with his own hands". Doubt has been cast on this story, however, on grounds that Heinsheimer, as an executive at G. Schirmer, would have been unlikely to have allowed Barber into the Schirmer offices to watch him rip apart the music that his company had invested money in publishing. The score was later reconstructed from the instrumental parts, and released in a Vox Box "Stradivari Classics" recording by the New Zealand Symphony Orchestra conducted by Andrew Schenck in 1988.

In 1943, Barber and Menotti purchased 'Capricorn', a house north of New York City in suburban Mount Kisco. The home served as their artistic retreat up until 1972, and it was at this house that Barber had his most productive years as a composer during the 1940s, 1950s, and early 1960s. Here he wrote ballet suite Medea (1946) for Martha Graham and the symphonic work Knoxville: Summer of 1915 for soprano and orchestra for opera singer Eleanor Steber who premiered the work with the BSO in 1948. In 1946 he was selected by the United States Department of State to be a member of the American delegation to the first Prague Spring International Music Festival where his music was showcased alongside other prominent American composers such as Leonard Bernstein. In 1949 he achieved a major critical success with his Piano Sonata which was premiered by Vladimir Horowitz and commissioned by Irving Berlin and Richard Rodgers to celebrate the 25th anniversary of the League of Composers. Popularized in concerts internationally by Horowitz and other prominent pianists, the work earned an enduring place in the performance canon.

In the 1950s Barber was engaged to conduct his own works with several symphony orchestras internationally for performances and recordings, including the BSO, the Berlin Philharmonic and the Frankfurt Radio Symphony. To prepare for recordings of his Second Symphony, Cello Concerto and the Medea ballet suite, he studied conducting with Nikolai Malko in 1951. In 1952 he was elected vice president of the International Music Council. In 1953 Barber was introduced to soprano Leontyne Price by her voice teacher Florence Kimball, who was a friend of Barber, when he approached Kimball about needing a singer to perform his song cycle Hermit Songs. Impressed with her voice, Barber engaged her to premiere the work at the Library of Congress with Barber accompanying on the piano. Price also sang for the premiere of Barber's cantata Prayers of Kierkegaard with the BSO in 1954, and would become closely associated with performances of his music over the next two decades.

In 1958 Barber won the Pulitzer Prize for Music for his first opera Vanessa which premiered at the Metropolitan Opera in January 1958 with a cast that included opera stars Eleanor Steber, Rosalind Elias, Regina Resnik, Nicolai Gedda, and Giorgio Tozzi. The Met took the production to the Salzburg Festival later that year, becoming the first American opera to be performed at that festival. Menotti wrote the libretto for both Vanessa, and Barber's second opera A Hand of Bridge. This latter work premiered at the Festival dei Due Mondi in Spoleto, Italy in 1959 with a cast that included Patricia Neway and William Lewis.

In 1962 Barber became the first American composer to attend the biennial Congress of Soviet Composers in Moscow. That same year he won the Pulitzer Prize a second time for his Piano Concerto which was one of three works by him commissioned for the opening of Lincoln Center and was performed at the opening of Philharmonic Hall with pianist John Browning in September 1962. The second work performed for the opening of Lincoln Center was his Andromache's Farewell, a piece for soprano and orchestra, which was premiered by the New York Philharmonic and soprano Martina Arroyo with Thomas Schippers conducting in April 1963. The final composition composed for Lincoln center was his third and final opera, Antony and Cleopatra, which premiered at the opening of the new Metropolitan Opera House in 1966 with Leontyne Price and Justino Diaz in the title roles. Barber worked on the opera in Greece and was visited by writer William Goyen's former lover, American artist Joseph Glasco and his collector-friend Stanley Seeger. This visit may have proved to be a distraction and the work was poorly received by critics, although Barber himself believed it contained some of his best work, and he spent the decade following its premiere revising the opera.

=== Later years (1966–1981) ===
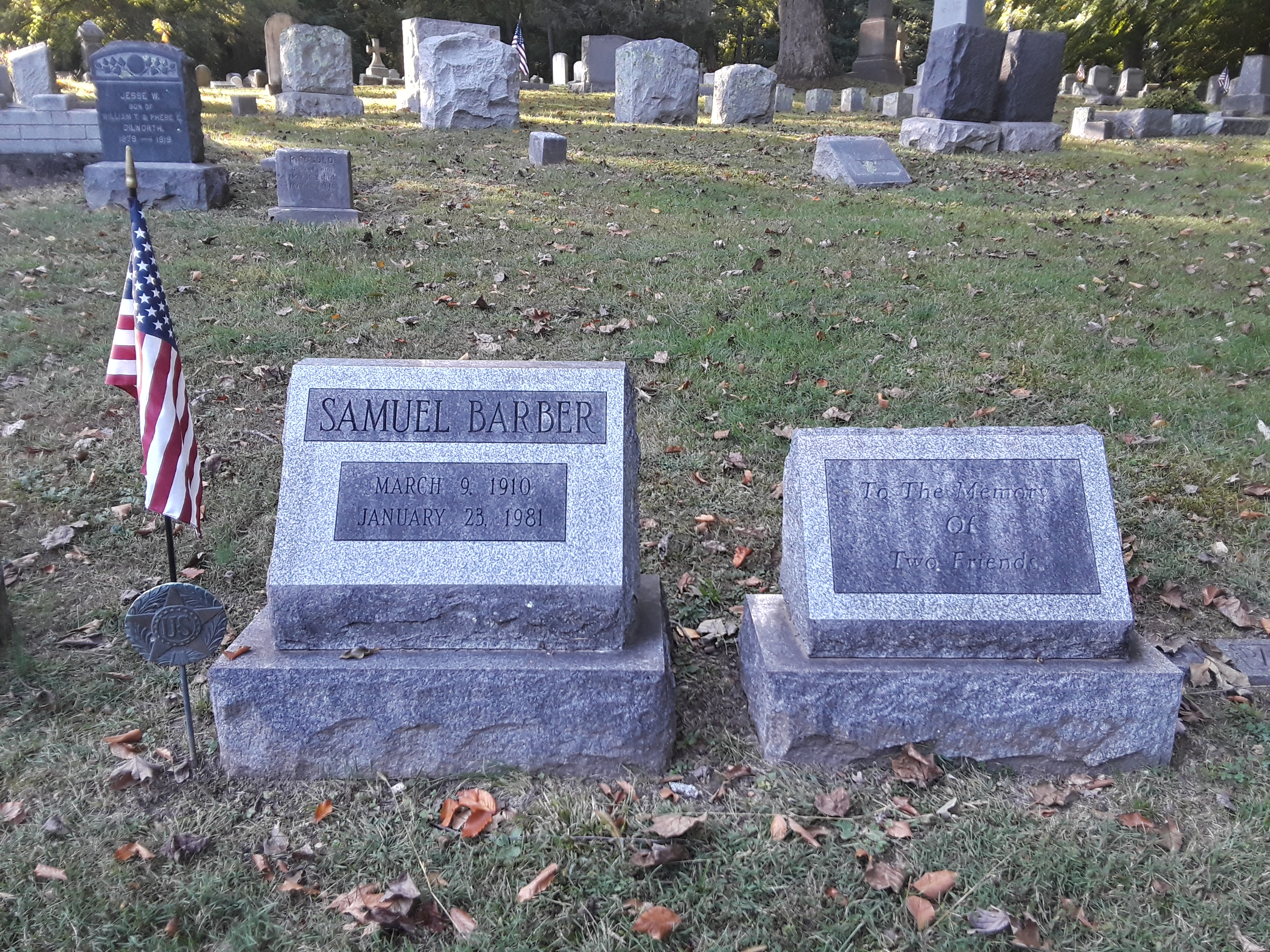
Samuel Barber's grave, on the left, at Oaklands Cemetery outside West Chester. The plot on the right had been purchased for Gian Carlo Menotti; as he did not use it, a stone inscribed "To the Memory of Two Friends" was erected there instead.

After the harsh rejection of his third opera Antony and Cleopatra (1966), Barber battled with depression and alcoholism which had a negative impact on his creative productivity. He began to divide his time between his home in New York and a chalet in Santa Cristina Gherdëina, where he spent long periods in isolation. Tensions grew between Menotti and Barber, leading Menotti to insist that the couple end their romantic attachment and put Capricorn up for sale in 1970. Capricorn was indeed sold in 1972, but the two men remained on friendly terms after their romantic involvement ended.

During his troubled later years, Barber continued to write music until he was almost 70 years old. In 1967, he successfully adapted his Adagio for Strings (1936) to a choral work, Agnus Dei, set to the Latin liturgical mass text on the Lamb of God. The work has become widely performed and recorded by choirs internationally. In 1969, Leontyne Price performed the premiere of Barber's song cycle Despite and Still which emphasized textual themes of loneliness, isolation, and lost love; all issues present in Barber's own personal life at the time of this work's creation. This work adopted a more modern dissonant harmonic language with vivid textual imagery characterized by tonal ambiguity and a frequent use of chromaticism, conflicting triads, tritones, and whole-tone segments.

In 1971, his cantata The Lovers was well received by audiences and critics when it premiered in performances with the Philadelphia Orchestra, Finnish baritone Tom Krause, and the Temple University Chorus directed by Robert Page. The Third Essay for Orchestra (1978) was his last major work.

Barber was hospitalized on and off between 1978 and 1981 while undergoing treatment for cancer. He died of the disease on January 23, 1981, at his 907 Fifth Avenue apartment in Manhattan at the age of 70. The funeral was held at the First Presbyterian Church of West Chester three days later and he was buried in the Oaklands Cemetery there. His final composition, Canzonetta for oboe and string orchestra (1981), was published after his death. Initially intended to be a fully developed oboe concerto, Barber only completed the second movement of that work.

== Personal life ==
Barber was in a relationship with the Italian composer Gian Carlo Menotti for more than 40 years. They lived at Capricorn, a house just north of New York City, where they frequently hosted parties with academic and music luminaries. Menotti was Barber's librettist for two of his three operas. When the relationship ended in 1970, they remained close friends until Barber's death from cancer in 1981.

== Achievements and awards ==
At the time of Barber's death in 1981, Pulitzer Prize winning music critic Donal Henahan wrote in The New York Times about Barber that "probably no other American composer has ever enjoyed such early, such persistent and such long-lasting acclaim".

Barber received numerous awards and prizes, including the Rome Prize, two Pulitzer Prizes, the Henry Hadley Medal (1958), and the Gold Medal for Music at the American Academy and Institute of Arts and Letters (1976). He was elected to the American Academy of Arts and Letters and, as a Fellow, to the American Academy of Arts and Sciences in 1961.

Barber was awarded the Edward MacDowell Medal in 1980 by the MacDowell Colony for outstanding contribution to the arts. In 1998, the American Classical Music Hall of Fame inducted Barber posthumously.

In addition to composing, Barber was active in organizations that sought to help musicians and promote music. He was president of the International Music Council of UNESCO. He worked to bring attention to and ameliorate adverse conditions facing musicians and musical organizations worldwide.

== Music ==
=== Orchestral ===
Through the success of his Overture to The School for Scandal (1931), Music for a Scene from Shelley (1933), Adagio for Strings (1936), (First) Symphony in One Movement (1936), (First) Essay for Orchestra (1937) and Violin Concerto (1939), Barber garnered performances by the world's leading conductors such as Artur Rodziński, Eugene Ormandy, Dimitri Mitropoulos, Bruno Walter, Charles Münch, George Szell, Leopold Stokowski, and Thomas Schippers.

Among his works are four concertos, one each for violin (1939), cello (1945) and piano (1962), and the neoclassical Capricorn Concerto for flute, oboe, trumpet and string orchestra (1944). He also wrote a concertante work for organ and orchestra entitled Toccata Festiva (1960).

Barber's final opus was the Canzonetta for oboe and string orchestra (1977–78), Op. 48, originally intended as the second movement of an oboe concerto.

=== Piano ===
Barber's most important and most played works for the piano include his Excursions, Op. 20, which emulate four styles of classic American idioms, including the boogie-woogie and blues, and the Piano Sonata in E-flat minor, Op. 26. The Nocturne (Homage to John Field), Op. 33, is another respected piece which he composed for the instrument. In 1977, the Van Cliburn Foundation commissioned Barber to write a Ballade, Op. 46, for the fifth Van Cliburn International Piano Competition.

=== Opera ===
Menotti supplied the libretto for Barber's opera Vanessa. (Menotti also contributed the libretto for Barber's chamber opera A Hand of Bridge.) In 1956, using his vocal training, Barber played and sang the score of Vanessa for the Metropolitan Opera's general manager, Rudolf Bing, who accepted the work. It premiered in January 1958. Vanessa won the 1958 Pulitzer Prize and gained acclaim as the first American grand opera.

Barber's Antony and Cleopatra was commissioned for the new Metropolitan Opera House at Lincoln Center, and premiered at the opening of Opera House on September 16, 1966. The elaborate production, designed by Franco Zeffirelli, was plagued with technical disasters; it also overwhelmed and obscured Barber's music, which most critics derided as uncharacteristically weak and unoriginal. The critical rejection of music that Barber considered to be among his best sent him into a deep depression. In recent years, a revised version of Antony and Cleopatra, for which Menotti provided collaborative assistance, has enjoyed some success.

=== Violin ===
In 1939 Philadelphia industrialist Samuel Simeon Fels commissioned Barber to write a violin concerto for Fels's ward, Iso Briselli, a 1934 graduate from the Curtis Institute of Music (as Barber was). The Barber biographies written by Nathan Broder (1954) and Barbara B. Heyman (1992) discuss the genesis of the concerto during the period of the violin concerto's commission and subsequent year leading up to the first performance. Heyman interviewed Briselli and others familiar with the history for her book. In late 2010, previously unpublished letters written by Fels, Barber, and Albert Meiff (Briselli's violin coach in that period), from the Samuel Simeon Fels Papers archived at the Historical Society of Pennsylvania, became available to the public.

== Notable compositions ==
- Dover Beach (medium voice and string quartet) (Op. 3, 1931)
- The School for Scandal (overture) (Op. 5, 1931)
- Cello Sonata (Op. 6, 1932)
- Music for a Scene from Shelley (Op. 7, 1933)
- (First) Symphony in One Movement (Op. 9, 1936)
- Adagio for Strings (1936 arr. of second movement of the String Quartet, Op. 11, 1936)
- Essay for Orchestra (Op. 12, 1938)
- Violin Concerto (Op. 14, 1939)
- Reincarnations for mixed chorus, (Op. 16, 1939–1940); words by Antoine Ó Raifteirí in translation by James Stephens
- Second Essay for Orchestra (Op. 17, 1942)
- Excursions (Op. 20, 1942–44)
- Capricorn Concerto (Op. 21, 1944)
- Cello Concerto (Op. 22, 1945)
- Medea (ballet) (Op. 23, 1946)
- Knoxville: Summer of 1915 (soprano and orchestra) (Op. 24, 1948)
- Sonata for Piano (Op. 26, 1949)
- Hermit Songs (Op. 29, 1953)
- Prayers of Kierkegaard (soprano, choir and orchestra) (Op. 30, 1954)
- Summer Music (wind quintet) (Op. 31, 1956)
- Vanessa (opera) (Op. 32, 1957)
- Nocturne (Homage to John Field) (piano) (Op. 33, 1959)
- A Hand of Bridge (chamber opera) (Op. 35, 1959)
- Toccata Festiva (organ and orchestra) (Op. 36, 1960)
- Piano Concerto (Op. 38, 1962)
- Agnus Dei (choral adaptation of Adagio for Strings, 1967)
- Antony and Cleopatra (Op. 40, opera, 1966, rev. 1974)

== Notes ==
Sources

- Broder, Nathan (1985) [1954]. Samuel Barber. Westport, Connecticut: Greenwood Press. ISBN 978-0-313-24984-6, reprint of Schirmer, New York (1954).
- Heinsheimer, Hans W. (1968). "The Composing Composer: Samuel Barber". ASCAP Today (2): 4–7.
- Henahan, Donal (February 8, 1975). "Juilliard Rehabilitating Antony and Cleopatra". The New York Times.
- Heyman, Barbara B. (1992). Samuel Barber: The Composer and His Music. New York and Oxford: Oxford University Press. ISBN 978-0-19-509058-1.
- Heyman, Barbara B. (February 21, 2024). "Barber, Samuel (Osmond)". Grove Music Online (8th ed.). Oxford University Press. doi:10.1093/gmo/9781561592630.article.01994. ISBN 978-1-56159-263-0. (subscription, Wikilibrary access, or UK public library membership required) (subscription required)
- Mostovoy, Marc (2010). "Iso Briselli, Samuel Barber, and the Violin Concerto, Op. 14: Facts and Fiction". Iso Briselli.
- Pollack, Howard (2023). Samuel Barber: His Life and Legacy. Urbana: University of Illinois Press. ISBN 978-0-252-04490-8.
- Schenck, Andrew. 1988. Booklet notes. Samuel Barber: Symphony No. 2; Music for a Scene from Shelley; Overture to The School for Scandal; First Essay; Adagio for Strings. The New Zealand Symphony Orchestra, Andrew Schenck, cond. CD recording. Stradivari Classics SCD 8012. Hackensack, New Jersey: Special Music Company.
- Simmons, Walter (2004). Voices in the Wilderness: Six American Neo-Romantic Composers. Lanham, Maryland: Scarecrow Press. ISBN 0-8108-4884-8. Paperback reprint edition: Lanham, Maryland: Scarecrow Press, 2006. ISBN 0-8108-5728-6.
- Smith, Patricia Juliana (2002). "Barber, Samuel (1910–1981)". In Claude J. Summers (ed.). glbtq: An Encyclopedia of Gay, Lesbian, Bisexual, Transgender, and Queer Culture. Chicago: glbtq, Inc. Archived from the original on April 11, 2005.
- Valente, Erasmo (June 27, 1983). "A Spoleto rinasce Cleopatra". l'Unità (in Italian).
- Wright, Jeffrey Marsh II (2010). The Enlisted Composer: Samuel Barber's Career 1942–1945 (PhD diss). University of North Carolina at Chapel Hill.
