= Hermit Songs =

Song cycle by Samuel Barber

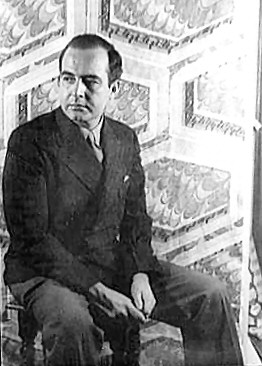
Samuel Barber in 1944

Hermit Songs is a cycle of ten songs for voice and piano by Samuel Barber. Written in 1953 on a grant from the Elizabeth Sprague Coolidge Foundation, it takes as its basis a collection of anonymous poems written by Irish monks and scholars from the 8th to the 13th centuries, in translations by W. H. Auden, Chester Kallman, Howard Mumford Jones, Kenneth H. Jackson and Seán Ó Faoláin.

The Hermit Songs received their premiere on October 30, 1953 at the Library of Congress, with soprano Leontyne Price and Barber himself as pianist.

== Songs ==
The ten songs of the cycle and the respective translators of each poem are as follows:

- "At St Patrick’s Purgatory" (translated by Seán Ó Faoláin)
- "Church Bell at Night" (translated by Howard Mumford Jones)
- "St Ita’s Vision" (translated by Chester Kallman)
- "The Heavenly Banquet" (translated by Seán Ó Faoláin)
- "The Crucifixion" (translated by Howard Mumford Jones)
- "Sea Snatch" (translated by Kenneth H. Jackson)
- "Promiscuity" (translated by Kenneth H. Jackson)
- "The Monk and his Cat" (translated by W.H. Auden)
- "The Praises of God" (translated by W.H. Auden)
- "The Desire for Hermitage" (translated by Seán Ó Faoláin)

"The Heavenly Banquet" text is attributed to St. Brigid according to Samuel Barber's score, who shares the patronage of Ireland with St. Patrick. She is known to practicing Catholics also as the patron saint of beer.

"[These songs] are small poems, thoughts or observations, some very short, and speak in straightforward, witty, and often surprisingly modern terms of the simple life they led - close to nature, their animals, and God. Some are literal translations and others were translated more freely (where existing translations seemed inadequate). Robin Flower has written in "The Irish Tradition": “It was not only that these scribes and anchorites lived by the destiny of their dedication in an environment of wood and sea; it was because they brought into that environment an eye washed miraculously clear by a continual spiritual exercise that they had that strange vision of natural things in an almost unnatural purity.”

== See also ==
Masterworks Portrait, Samuel Barber: Knoxville: Summer of 1915; Dover Beach; Hermit Songs; Andromache's Farewell. Various artists.
