= Excursions (Barber) =

Piano composition by Samuel Barber

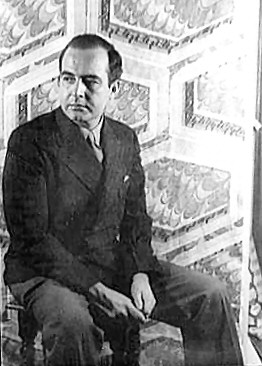
Samuel Barber in 1944

Excursions, Op. 20, is the first published solo piano piece by Samuel Barber. Barber himself explains:

These are 'Excursions' in small classical forms into regional American idioms. Their rhythmic characteristics, as well as their source in folk material and their scoring, reminiscent of local instruments are easily recognized.

This is typical of neo-Romantic composers such as Barber. As Susan Carter explains in her dissertation, "The Piano Music of Samuel Barber", that "neo-Romantic composers returned to a style characterized by broad lyricism and dramatic expression." She also states that the traditional structures of form from the eighteenth and nineteenth centuries were conserved while drawing upon a "contemporary technical vocabulary." From a boogie-woogie style of a five-part rondo to a theme and variations of a well known cowboy ballad, and even to a barn-yard dance with a fiddler, Barber uses each style effectively and accurately, according to the neo-Romantic ideas.

The third movement incorporates the melody from Streets of Laredo, an American folk song.

== History ==
Before composing his Piano Sonata, Samuel Barber was asked by Jeanne Behrend, a personal friend of his and an accomplished pianist, to write a longer, more involved piece for piano that "would be appropriate to perform on one of her programs of American music." Barber obliged, and in June 1942 the first movement of Excursions was completed. As it turns out, this piano solo set is the "sole experiment in a nationalistic vein" in Barber's career of composing. Even Behrend herself claimed that these pieces were "excursions into a style not typical of Barber"

In July 1944, Vladimir Horowitz had been interested in performing works by an American composer. He was very impressed with Barber and his composing that he specifically requested to debut Excursions. At that point, movement III had not been written yet, it was the last to be written, and so Horowitz only received movements I, II and IV. He debuted these three pieces on November 28, 1944, at the Brooklyn Academy of Music. He also performed the music on January 4, 1945, at the Philadelphia Academy of Music. It was received well and in March of that year, Horowitz performed the three Excursions in New York at Carnegie Hall. In January 1946 they were performed at Carnegie Hall by Rudolf Firkusny, who also included them at his recitals in Czechoslovakia that year (including the first Prague Spring Festival 1946) and continued performing them over the following concert season. The official debut of all four movements of Excursions was left to Behrend who performed them in December 1948, four years after the completion of the set.

== Music ==
The work has four movements:

1. Un poco allegro
2. In slow blues tempo
3. Allegretto
4. Allegro molto

=== I. Un poco allegro ===
Barber's first movement from Excursions shows how the composer combines classic forms with contemporary idioms. He uses many characteristics of Blues within the restrictions of classic forms to create these contemporary songs that have a familiar aspect about them.

The first movement of Samuel Barber's Excursions, entitled "Un poco allegro," is a classic five-part rondo form. Barber begins with the main element of the movement, the bass Ostinato. This bass pattern is what brings Nathan Broder to call this movement a boogie-woogie." The New Grove Dictionary explains that a Boogie-woogie is

a percussive style of piano Blues favoured for its volume and momentum… is characterized by the use of blues chord progressions combined with a forceful, repetitive left-hand bass figure… [and] independence of the right-hand improvisations from the steady, rolling rhythm maintained by the left hand.

This left hand, bass Ostinato repeats itself, almost exactly, twenty-two times within the A^{1} section alone. As stated above, this repetitive nature of the left hand, under an improvisatory right, is a characteristic of a Boogie-woogie.

The overall form of movement I is the classic, rondo form Russell Friedewald, in his dissertation entitled "A Formal and Stylistic Analysis of the Published Music of Samuel Barber", divides the sections of this movement into A^{1}BA^{2}CA^{3} Coda. His reasoning for this division of the sections is based upon the bass note of the ostinato pattern. From the beginning of the movement through measure 37, the bass ostinato stays on C. In measures 38 through 55, the bass ostinato moves to F, signifying the B section.

Sections A^{1}, A^{2}, and A^{3} are in the tonic key while B is under the sub-dominant (F) key and C is in the dominant (G) key. The overall I-IV-I-V-I progression is very simple but it provides a "structural unity of this piece in which motivic material freely crosses sectional boundaries."

The first A section introduces the main melodic pattern that can be found within other sections of the movement, which can be seen in measures 4 through 6.

This figure contains three repeated E♭s followed by a broken tonic triad. In measure six, there is an added B♭ creating a seventh-chord on C. The seventh of the tonic C minor triad does not function correctly in a typical harmonic progression; it is actually treated as a consonant note. These types of harmonies as well as the heavily syncopated rhythms are characteristics "commonly used in blues and jazz."

Both Sifferman and Carter mention Barber's use of the "blue" notes in this movement. The blue-note," which is the third, seventh, and occasionally the fifth, would be sung or played a semitone lower than the diatonic pitch. Initially, musicologists thought that blues singers were using, for example, the E♭ and B♭ in the key of C major, but the "downhome" blues musicians tended to bend, or "worry," the notes, rather than actually change tones. In Barber's movement, the lowered third and seventh scale degrees already exist within the key signature as consonant tones. Although the Blue-notes exist in the key signature, Barber utilizes the raised tones as well.

In measure 4, for instance, the repeated E♭ is heavily emphasized as well as the whole C-minor triad through measure five. Just a few bars later in measure 10, we see the raised third, an E♮. Also the first appearance of the raised seventh scale degree occurs enharmonically as a C♭ in measure 41. It proceeds to the B♭ when the A^{2} section returns in bar 56. Carter takes it a step further and shows how the G♭, the lowered scale degree five and a tritone from C, are emphasized.

In measures 29 through 32… the melodic figure is centered on G♭, accompanied by the ostinato built on C. Another example of emphasis of the tri-tone occurs in measures 44 through 46: the right hand pattern is based on a B seventh chord, while the left-hand [ostinato] pattern is based on F. These passages also hint at bitonality.

New Grove's definition of boogie-woogie includes the term "momentum" as a characteristic. Barber creates forward motion with quarter-notes followed by eighth- and sixteenth-notes in quick succession. Through the use of this rhythm, the momentum of the music quickens until bars 9 through 13, where the rhythm slows down.

The sixteenth notes on beats four and five of measure nine is the beginning of the slowing down momentum. Measure 10 starts slowing the rhythm by the use of eighth-notes, quarter-note triplets, and finally, quarter-notes, when the primary motive pattern returns in measure 13.

Another instance where the momentum of the piece begins to slow down is right before the start of the A^{3} section. Six measures before 90, the right hand melody consists of straight sixteenth-notes creating a very fast pace. In bar 92, the right hand chords allude to the rhythm of the main melodic pattern found in bar 4, but at a slightly slower pace. This same rhythmic pattern, a dotted quarter-note followed by a half-note and quarter-note triplet, persists for twelve measures until measure 103, when we see a change. Each following measure continues to slow down the momentum that has been building throughout the entire piece until the Coda in measure 107.

These momentum shifts also help to create "textual contrasts [that] define each section." The A^{1} and A^{2} sections only utilize two voice textures. Sections B and C contain quick rhythmic chords in the right hand, and in the A^{3} section, the right hand contains rhythmically broader chords.

Another term by which The New Grove Dictionary defines a boogie-woogie is "volume." In this movement, any one of the sections can contain a pp dynamic marking (m. 11, 56, 84-91, and 106 to the end) all the way up to a ff (m. 53, 77, 80-83). This highly contrasting dynamic range in one movement is an aspect of the boogie-woogie that creates attention and interest.

Barber describes these Excursions by stating that the characteristics, "reminiscent of local instruments, are easily recognized." There are instances in this movement, and the others, that bring up certain instruments that could be "playing" the melody. Sifferman imagines the "main theme (m. 4-9) played on saxophone, while the right-hand figure in measures 44-46 sounds like [a] harmonica, imitating the alternately in and out breath motions."

According to Sifferman, the F-major chords in the right hand on beats one and three, starting halfway through measure 45, are the tones that are created when air is "blown into" a harmonica. The tones that occur when breath is "drawn in" through the instrument comprise the B major seventh chord. On a typical diatonic harmonica, the tones that are created when air is drawn through the instrument correspond to the dominant of the key of the instrument, not the tritone. This further illustrates Barber's use of the tritone in this movement.

Barber uses the bass ostinato, the "blue" chords, improvisatory melodic lines and characteristics that are similar to instruments to achieve an idiomatic style within classic limitations.

=== II. In slow blues tempo ===
The second movement, entitled 'In slow blues tempo,' encapsulates the popular American idiom, a "rich and elegant blues." Barber uses "conventional harmonic progressions and melodic and rhythmic features associated with blues" to continue the overarching idea of the American idiom within classic form.

Movement II contains four twelve-bar phrases that utilize harmonies very similar to movement I. Russell Friedewald was the first individual to formally analyze this set of Excursions in 1957. His explanation for this movement is the clearest: "the second in this set, a rich and elegant blues, is divided into four twelve-measure sections, each being improvisatory in nature."

As previously mentioned, this movement is what New Grove calls "twelve-bar blues."

As the blues was created largely by musicians who had little education and scarcely any of whom could read music, improvisation, both verbal and musical, was an essential part of it... To facilitate improvisation a number of patterns evolved, of which the most familiar is the Twelve-bar blues.

The typical harmonic structure of Blues, as identified by New Grove, is the twelve-bar blues.

Because blues is based on improvisation, having a common and familiar chord progression lends itself to an easier improvisation. Not every blues progression is exactly the same, but this one in particular is very common, and Barber uses this progression almost exactly. What ties this movement with the first is the harmonic progression. The boogie-woogie, which is "a style of piano blues," also contains the chord progression I-IV-I-V-I.

Each large phrase of a twelve-bar blues is broken up into three sub-phrases consisting of four measures each. In the third sub-phrase, the third measure contains two harmonic possibilities. In the first and third twelve-bar phrases of Barber's movement, the subdominant harmony (C) occurs after the dominant harmony (D); however, in the second and fourth twelve-bar phrases, the subdominant does not occur, but rather the tonic appears. The harmonic movement from V → IV → I, creating a plagal-type of cadence, is weaker than the V → V → I movement. When Barber uses this type of movement in the last 12-bar phrase, it creates a strong closing gesture. This is one way in which Barber strays from the typical twelve-bar blues form.

Another way that Barber differs from the typical twelve-bar blues pattern is that on the first, second and fourth occurrence of the phrase, there is an added measure to each. The first twelve-bar phrase, measure 1 through 13, has its repeated measure at the end of the phrase. Through means of extension by repetition, measure 13 is identical to bar 12. The second and fourth phrases do not contain a repeated measure at the end of the phrase.

In phrase 2, measure 14 through 26, there is an extension by repetition from measures 14 to 16. Those three measures can be grouped together as can measures 17 and 18 for their melodic similarities. Measures 14 to 16 all contain the melodic bass figure and a parallel right hand pattern as well. The next two measures are the second half of that sub-phrase. The right hand chord is a G-major triad with an added second underneath a B to G eighth-note triplet pattern.

The exact extension that occurred in phrase 2 also occurs in phrase 4 due to their striking similarities. Even though the right-hand motive in phrase 4 begins a third higher, it is still very similar to phrase 2's occurrence. Measure 39 is repeated twice instead of just one time with a few slight alterations to the rhythmic patterns before moving to the G-major triad with an added second in bar 42. Barber uses this addition of one measure to some of the twelve-bar phrases. By doing this, he makes the overall structure atypical compared to the standard twelve-bar phrase.

As mentioned briefly before, there are unifying phrases throughout the twelve-bar phrases that help to connect each section we the other. One way in which Barber unifies all of these sections is through the use of specific melodic figures. The left-hand bass figure in measures 1 to 2 is used ten times in this movement.

"The rhythmic pattern of the accompaniment motive is a common blues figure." The other, and more important, unifying motive is the descending third melodic figure within the right hand. This figure occurs at the start of every new twelve-bar phrase. Within this movement one can find this descending motive returning in either the left or the right hand.

The harmonies of this movement consist of strictly the tonic (G), subdominant (C), and dominant (D) tonalities. However, there is some debate as to whether this movement is indeed in G, or as the key signature says, C. Friedewald claims that this movement is centered on C with each section being "limited to the tonic and dominant chord." However, through closer analysis, this piece is centered on G. Sifferman explains that "simply listening to or playing the piece… makes the tonal center [of] G undeniably clear to the ear."

In Friedewald's defense, this movement's key signature indicates C major, there are a fair number of G dominant seventh chords, and the final chord of the piece is a perfect fifth on C. There is some truth in saying this movement is in C, but Barber most likely chose not to include a key signature to further emphasize the "blue" notes, specifically, the lowered sevenths. In an analysis of this movement in G major, the "absence of a sharp in the key signature is accounted for by the… F♮." This further explains that the F♮s which occur within the tonic harmonies were not written for the purpose of creating dominant seventh chords. "By avoiding the F♯ in the key signature, the lowered seventh is established as a constant pitch, while the use of the leading tone is the exception."

In the first measure, Barber incorporates another "blue" note, the lowered third. The B♭ (enharmonically spelled A♯) creating "increased tension or dissonance… harmonically." Barber continues, throughout this movement with the added "blue" notes that create the harmonic tension characteristic of a blues piece.

In measures 19 through 22 Barber emphasizes the raised and lowered third scale degrees in the left hand octaves. This first begins with the pick up B♮. Additionally, Barber makes use of the lowered seventh scale degree, F♮ as a melodic tone over the tonic chord. This further demonstrates Barber's "bending or worrying" particular scale degrees to create a blues mood.

Clearly the slowest movement of all four, this piece has a subtle uniqueness about it that makes it stand out from the rest. This is especially heard in the final chord of the movement. The movement ends on the subdominant harmony which Sifferman believes it ends as "though the progression could continue 'ad infinitum.'"

=== III. Allegretto ===
Barber's third movement of Excursions, marked "Allegretto," is a theme and variations described by Broder as "a sophisticated set of variations on a charming folk-like melody." There is no doubt that this movement's melodic nature is that of a folk tune, but there is some debate if this was a pre-existing tune at the time Barber arranged it. It was not until Allan Kozinn published an interview with Samuel Barber in 1981 that the author confirmed that this movement was based on the tune "Streets of Laredo." There is, however, still some uncertainty.

James Sifferman, in his thesis, states:

While there is similarity between a small portion of the melodic material found in the cowboy ballad and a melodic fragment in the Excursion, it is uncertain that Barber consciously borrowed preexisting folk material in constructing the Excursion.

When listening to the tune "Streets of Laredo," one can clearly hear the melodic similarity to Barber's third movement. Furthermore, when looking at a score of the folk tune, one can easily see the connection between the two pieces. It is highly unlikely that Barber based only a small portion of the movement on the folk tune.

Both consequent phrases of "Streets of Laredo" and the theme from Barber's allegretto begin on a D♭ and proceed to descend to the D♭ an octave below. In measure 9 of the ballad, the first D♭ is being prolonged through moving to an inner voice of the I harmony, the B♭, before moving to the C in bar 10. An upper neighbor, the D♭, also prolongs the C before continuing to descend. This descent ends in measure 12 on the lower D♭.

This motion is also evident in the allegretto stretching from measures 5 and 6. The first D♭ moves to the B♭ by way of an incomplete neighbor, the A♭. It then moves up by step into the C before descending down to the lower octave D♭. This register change is clearly seen in both the "Streets of Laredo" and in the allegretto.

Starting at the lower octave D♭ in the ballad, there is an initial upward skip of a fourth followed by a prolongation of the G♭ by a lower-neighbor, the F. Then the melody rises by step to the C before stepping down to the B♭ and eventually skipping to the G♭. Finally, to cadence the tune, the melody steps up into the G♭ before returning to the final G♭.

Even when briefly analyzed, the allegretto contains almost the exact melodic line from the cowboy ballad. Beginning on the low D♭ in measure 6, which is the last note of the septuplet in the melody, the ballad is explicitly borrowed in this section. There are two places in which the two tunes are not exact: the first is measure 13 of the ballad and the second in measure 7 of the allegretto. In measure 13 of the ballad, there is a lower-neighbor (F) that prolongs the G♭; in Barber's movement, the G♭ (m. 7) is simply repeated without the neighbor.

The F in bar 13 of the "Streets of Laredo" tune is not as significant as other tones in the melody because of its treatment as a non-chord tone. That Barber chose not to carry that note over to his arrangement of the tune is not detrimental to the overall shape of the melodic line. When analyzing that beat more closely, there is, in fact, a non-chord tone that acts as a lower-neighbor. That non-chord tone is the D♭ to the E♭. Even though Barber did not include the original F lower-neighbor in the melody, there is still one included; however it is simply not in the original position. The other location in which Barber has taken liberty with his arrangement of the consequent phrase of the tune is in the first two beats of measure 8. Barber has chosen to repeat the B♭ instead of immediately moving to the G♭ like in the ballad.

Sifferman's analysis of this movement claims that there is some uncertainty whether or not Barber "consciously borrowed" the tune "Streets of Laredo" for this arrangement. There is no direct evidence in previous research that states Barber's intentions with this movement. However, when analyzed more closely, one can clearly see that there is no question about this matter. Barber undoubtedly borrows this melody, if not, quotes it exactly.

The first eight measure phrase is broken into four measures of the antecedent and four measures of the consequent phrase, creating a "binary theme," a + b. The harmonic progression consists of a two-measure pattern using the I, vi, ii and V chords. There is one alteration to that harmonic progression in measure 7 where the tonic harmony should return to begin a new two-measure pattern. Instead of the tonic sonority, the vi chord appears which immediately moves the harmonic rhythm forward half a measure. In measure 8, the dominant chord occurs for the entire measure, making up for the lost half measure in 7. The last measure of the theme, measure 8 is typically harmonized as I6/4 to V.

This repetitive harmonic progression dominates the entire movement, implying a harmonic ostinato beneath the melody. As seen in the first and the second movements, the third movement utilizes a basic harmonic progression to lay the framework for a seemingly improvisatory melody and variations later on in the piece.

The first few measures of this movement show some very unusual rhythmic organization in the right hand. In Carter's performance analysis of this movement, she explains "this movement poses the greatest number of technical and rhythmic problems for the performer." She goes on to say that Barber, through this very unusual rhythm of seven against eight, disguises the original theme. This rhythm is very difficult to play because when the two hands are playing together, the only time the beats align is on the downbeat of each measure. Despite this difficult rhythm, Barber "achieves a piquant, casual" and "overall easy-going bright and cheery mood."

When listening to this piece, there seems to be a free, "bar-less feeling" throughout the main theme. This is accomplished through the unusual rhythmic organization in the right hand. It is also accomplished in the root of specific chords not occurring on the strong beats. Arriving on the fifth of a chord as the lowest sounding pitch (second inversion) is a weak voicing and does not create strong harmonic movement. The submediant chord arrives in root position on the off-beat of beat three, losing the strong middle pulse of a measure. This also occurs on the V chord, but instead of arriving on the fifth of the chord, it actually arrives on the root. However, immediately after that, the left hand moves an octave down, implying the "true" arrival of the dominant.

The first variation begins in measure 9, but the a phrase does not change from its first statement at the beginning of the movement. Only when the b section arrives in bar 13 is there a change of the original theme. Instead of continuing the seven-against-eight melodic line, Barber uses heavily syncopated, blocked sixteenth chords in the right hand, with the top note in each chord as the main melodic tone. While that is taking place, the left hand continues the eighth notes for two beats before switching to quintuplets for two beats.

As mentioned earlier, each blocked chord in the right hand consists of the melody in the top voice with the basic harmonic progression. However, Barber incorporates an added second or fourth. With those added tones, the triads can be considered cluster chords, or, more likely in this specific instance, as extended tertian harmonies of the basic progression. When analyzed as extended tertian, measures 13 and 14 are I^{9}, vi^{11}, ii^{11}, and V^{13}. This is another way that the melodic theme is "disguised" within the harmonies.

When variation I completes at the end of measure 16, variation II begins the a phrase in the original version, except at an octave above. When the b phrase appears, it occurs within the same octave as the a section, with a slightly more complex sixteenth-note rhythm in the right hand. At the same time, the eighth-note followed by a quintuplet pattern continues. This variation is similar to variation I in this manner.

Variation III occurs in measure 25. This is the first variation that does not start with the a section, but rather, with the b section. Carter explains that in "most variation forms, the theme gradually becomes more obscured, as illustrated by the third variation." Barber uses more complex rhythms between the right and left hands. The right hand uses dotted sixteenth-notes, triplets, and sextuplets, while the left hand plays the implied ostinato harmonic progression in quintuplets. The b section is repeated with increased complexity of rhythms: dotted sixteenth-note to thirty-second note patterns. Measure 32 contains a large scale that ascends from the C_{3} to the high B♭_{6}.

In measure 33, Barber has written a scale with the mood of the section in mind. Every time a cluster appears, it occurs on the two or three consecutive black keys on the piano. Barber composed this passage so that the listener can perceive the entire span of the scale in a shorter amount of time without sounding frantic or rushed. This variation has a natural flowing feeling throughout, and for Barber to include the scale in this manner helps to add to that effect.

Variation IV begins in measure 33 with the original occurrence of the a phrase. When the b section appears in measure 37, it is the first time that the melody is heard in the left hand rather the right. The b melody is played with open block chords consisting of primarily sixths in parallel motion, creating a new sonority during the b section. The right hand has a constant sixteenth-note ostinato pattern that has an octave displacement every two beats. This section is also the first time in the movement that the rhythmic organization of the melody is simple with a few slightly syncopated dotted eighth- to sixteenth-note fragments. These less complicated rhythms are consistent throughout the rest of the movement until the next variation.

At the start of Variation V in measures 41 through 44, the constant sixteenth-notes of the right hand now continues in both hands. This variation consists of two statements of the consequent phrase from the original theme, instead of the typical a plus b phrases. The right hand continues with a new ostinato pattern involving D♭ and E♭ rather than C and D♭. It is similar to the previous variation, but still uses a two-octave displacement. The left hand utilizes sixteenth-note arpeggiations down from the main accented melodic tone.

In the music, Barber shows the distinction between the melody and the arpeggiations through the use of upward-facing stems. For a performer, this can be very difficult to execute due to the need to accent certain tones of constant sixteenth-note pattern to bring out the melody. This effect creates the feeling of two accompaniment voices alongside a third primary melodic voice. The second consequent phrase of Variation V, measures 45 through 48. The rhythmic pattern of the constant sixteenth-notes continues, but for the first two bars the melody cannot be seen explicitly.

The harmonic progression of the first two measures of the b phrase is still preserved; however the melodic line is much more ambiguous. There is one tone that does not exist in the melody, that is the A♭ that should occur in third or fourth beats of measure 45. The B♭ occurs on the very last sixteenth-note of the measure, but there is not an A♭. The A♭ in the original melody is treated as an incomplete neighbor tone to the B♭, so for it not to be present in this variation is not of much importance.

Another instance in which the melody is not exact is in measure 46. Here, the D♭ occurs before the F, but because both of those tones are a part of the overall V harmony, the importance is focused on the harmonic movement back to the tonic, rather than the specific melodic movement. In measure 47, the top G♭ in the right hand has an arrow next to it showing the start of the rest of the melody in the top voice of the right hand.

From Susan Carter's dissertation, she explains the next section, Variation VI.

The theme is treated broadly, with block chords in both hands. While this variation displays the richest sonority, rhythmic tension is avoided: both hands play the exact same rhythms. Although the pattern is in septuplets, the homorhythmic element gives this variation a sense of great power and stability.

This variation uses both antecedent and consequent phrases of the original theme, differing from the previous variation. Measure 55 consists of the septuplet melody in the right hand over constant eighth-note movement in parallel octaves by the left hand. This re-introduces the seven-against-eight rhythmic organization heard in the original theme.

As Variation VII begins, the unusual rhythmic organization continues in both consequent phrases. The second b phrase is written an octave higher with some mode mixture within the melody and harmony in the first two measures, 61 and 62. Typically the last variation, number VIII, or the coda, which begins in measure 65, restates the original theme. In this case, Barber restates the a phrase, and in bar 69, the a begins as if to repeat itself, however it becomes modified. The last two measures slow down rhythmically, creating a gentle feeling to end the coda section and the overall movement.

As a theme and variations movement with seven different variations and a final coda, Barber is able to expand a popular and much loved cowboy ballad many different ways. With the difficult and unusual rhythmic organization that continually becomes more challenging, he provides the performer an opportunity to show their skill.

=== IV. Allegro molto ===
The fourth movement is an "exuberant and joyous barn dance," and functions as the finale of the complete set. This movement in particular captures the idiomatic sounds and styles of a fiddler and his or her accompanying harmonica or accordion player. With a tonal center on F, the primary harmonies used are F-major and B♭ major chords, the I and IV harmonies respectively. Added tones are also frequently used.

The form of this movement was first called a "frame form" by Friedewald in his dissertation. The A section from measures 1 to 13, the B from measure 14 to 56 and the return of A', measures 56 through 70. However, the B section can be further analyzed as its own type of ternary form (a: m. 14-23, a': m. 24-33, b: m. 34-40, a: m. 41-48, retransition: m. 49-56). This way of analyzing the B section tends to be more truthful to what actually occurs in the music.

Sifferman takes the form of this movement a step further by explaining that this movement can be analyzed in an arch form. "The idea of the two A sections being merely a frame seems unjustified in view of their relative length and substance." Viewing this movement as an arch form combines both Friedewald's analysis of the frame form with better explaining the larger B section. With this analysis, the larger B section now is broken up into B, C and a retransition section.

In the very beginning of this movement, Barber presents two motives upon which he expands throughout the rest of the piece. The initial blocked chords consisting of the tonic and subdominant harmonies is Motive 1. Because of the strict limitation of harmonies, the music seems to imply that this is idiomatic to a harmonica. The next two measures introduce another voice consisting of a repeated pattern of sixteenth-notes while the harmonica accompaniment continues. This fast-paced sixteenth rhythm implies a fiddle-like feeling. The combination of the fiddle and harmonica, create these two voices that move "like freely improvised parts over the simple alternation of tonic and subdominant harmonies."

Barber uses these two motives, with slightly altered versions, multiple times within this piece. In measure 6, the alternating tonic to subdominant chord motive-1 pattern returns for one measure before moving to the sixteenth-note pattern in measure 7. Motive 2 lasts for three bars instead of the regular two. In measure 10 the texture changes over the tonic harmony, beginning the transition into the B^{1} section. In bar 12 there is an added non-chord tone, the G♯ that adds color and intensity to the tonic harmony. Motive 2 appears returning multiple times in measures 19, 21, 28, 31, and 33.

The B^{1} section starts on measure 14 and ends in bar 22 followed by a transition to B^{2} in measure 23. There is another motive that Barber composed that is only found within the three middle sections of this movement. Motive 3 is the left-hand pattern that occurs in measures 14 through 17 can be found two other times in the movement (measures 24 and 41). The Motive 3 pattern and the proceeding melody that occurs after is very idiomatic to the fiddle while the accompaniment pattern continues to be similar to the harmonica.

The transition in measure 23 that moves the piece from B^{1} to B^{2} has a similarity to the transitional measure in bar 12. The added G♯ creates a tension and intensity to move the piece forward. These first two B sections start at a mf and slowly crescendo all the way to ff in measure 31. Barber uses the motive 2 multiple times during this passage and each time it appears, the dynamic level is altered in some way. In bar 19, Motive 2 "fiddling" through its sixteenth-notes on f after crescendo-ing into that. In measures 28 and 31, motive 2 is restated again, except these two times, both are stated in an octave and two octaves higher respectively.

Section B^{2} ends in measure 33 and in bar 34, the C phrase begins. With the added "con forza" and it still being ff, Barber includes shows how these two measures are the most important of the entire piece. These two measures is a modified restatement of the Motive 1. Instead of alternating quarter-notes triads, Barber creates more intensity with syncopated eighth- and sixteenth-note rhythms. (see Ex. 19) Also the alternating tonic to subdominant harmonies unifies this movement through every section.

It is still ff until measure 36 when the dynamic changes to mp. Not only does the dynamics change, but a new melodic idea is introduced. This new melody occurs in the right hand in parallel-third motion. The occurrence of this one-bar melodic idea is the only time in the piece that Barber uses it.

Not only does measure 36 contain a melodic rhythm that is only heard once, it also contains E♭s in the accompaniment as well as beat four in the right hand. As previously discussed in Movement II of the Excursions set, Barber uses "blue" notes that are characteristic of the blues style. These "blue" notes are typically the thirds or sevenths that have been bended or "worried" lower than their traditional diatonic tones. In this instance, Barber uses the "blue" E♭ starting in measure 36 and lasting through measure 40 before B^{1} returns. In measure 40, the transition from C back to B^{1} contains A♭ and E♭ seventh chords, varying briefly from the limited harmonies of the tonic and subdominant.

The B^{1} section starting in measure 41 is an exact repetition of the B^{1} section that began in measure 14. However, measure 17 of B^{1} does not repeat as it should in bar 44 of the B^{2} phrase. Motive 3 reappears in this section in the left hand as does Motive 2 in measures 45 and 47 of the right. Beginning in measure 49, a retransition occurs to bring the original A section back. This retransition continues to alternate between the tonic and subdominant harmonies but also contains many added tones. These sixteenth-note rhythms and chords are fairly syncopated, but Barber includes accent marks over the certain beats to further enhance the syncopation. Even though starting in measure 53 there is a diminuendo included, the motion and intensity is still preserved through the stringendo a poco a poco.

After ending the retransition section from B^{1} to A^{1} on a middle C, Barber alters the original motive 1 again. The beginning of the A^{1} section alters motive 1 with "appoggiaturas built on chromatic quartal harmonies." Sifferman hears these chromatic grace notes as imitations of "the sound achieved through breathing alternately in and out on a harmonica." Barber continues to imitate the sounds of common instruments within this barn-yard dance movement.

After measure 58, there is a literal restatement of the original A from the beginning of the movement. The closing section begins to conclude the movement starting at measure 66 on a tonic harmony with an added sixth, D. After a four-measure decrescendo into measure 69 on a pp, bar 70 ends the movement with an arpeggiated F^{9} extended Tertian harmony. This "blues ninth chord" is another instance how Barber creates aspects that "idiomatic to the harmonica."

Throughout this entire movement, either in the right or left hand, there is a clear melodic line on a single tone or in thirds. Accompanying that melody is another voice that is strictly chordal and only limited vocabulary of harmonies. In this stylized barn dance, Barber recreates the American idiom of a fiddler with another person accompanying them on the harmonica or accordion.

== Bibliography ==
- Barber, Samuel. Excursions, Op. 20. New York: G. Schirmer, Inc., 1945.
- Barber, Samuel. Samuel Barber: Complete Piano Music. New York: G. Schirmer, Inc., 1993.
- Broder, Nathan. Samuel Barber. New York: G. Schirmer, Inc., 1954.
- Carter, Susan Blinderman. "The Piano Music of Samuel Barber". Ann Arbor, Michigan: University Microfilms International, 1980. Microfilm.
- Felsenfeld, Daniel. Britten and Barber: Their Lives and Their Music. Pompton Plains: Amadeus Press, 2005.
- Friedewald, Russell Edward. "A Formal and Stylistic Analysis of the Published Music of Samuel Barber". Ann Arbor, MI: Xerox University Microfilm, 1957. Microfilm.
- Hennessee, Don A. Samuel Barber: A Bio-Bibliography. Westport: Greenwood Press, 1985.
- Heyman, Barbara B. Samuel Barber: The Composer and His Music. New York: Oxford University Press, 1992.
- Laird, Paul R. "Review of Samuel Barber." American Music, vol. 17, no. 2, Summer 1999.
- Kozinn, Allan. "Samuel Barber: The Legacy – A comprehensive critique of this noted American composer's vocal, choral, chamber and solo, and stage works." High Fidelity (July 1981): 45-47, 89-90.
- Nadal, David. American Folk Songs for Guitar. Mineola: Dover Publications, Inc., 2001.
- Sadie, Stanley. The New Grove Dictionary of Music and Musicians, 2nd ed. London: Macmillan Publishers Limited, 2001.
- Sifferman, James. "Samuel Barber's Works for Solo Piano". Ann Arbor, Michigan: University Microfilms International, 1982. Microfilm.
- Simmons, Walter. Voices in the Wilderness: Six American Neo-Romantic Composers. Lanham: The Scarecrow Press, Inc., 2004.
- Svard, Lois. "Review of Complete Piano Music by Samuel Barber". Notes, Second Series, vol. 42, no. 3, March 1986.
