= Violin Concerto (Barber) =

1939 musical work by Samuel Barber

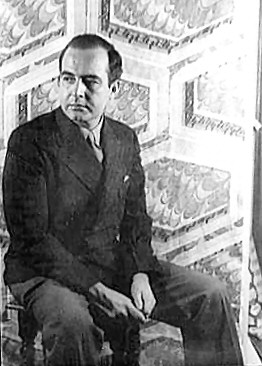
Samuel Barber in 1944

Samuel Barber completed his Violin Concerto, Op. 14, in 1939. The violin concerto has three movements and lasts about 22 minutes.

== History ==
In 1939, Philadelphia industrialist Samuel Simeon Fels commissioned Barber to write a violin concerto for his ward, Iso Briselli, a graduate from the Curtis Institute of Music the same year as Barber, 1934. The Barber biographies written by Nathan Broder (1954) and Barbara B. Heyman (1992) discuss the genesis of the concerto during the period of its commission and the subsequent year leading up to the first performance. Heyman interviewed Briselli and others familiar with the history in her publication. In late 2010, previously unpublished letters written by Fels, Barber, and Albert Meiff (Briselli's violin coach in that period) from the Samuel Simeon Fels Papers archived at the Historical Society of Pennsylvania became available to the public.

Barber accepted Fels's advance and went to Switzerland to work on the concerto. Barber started working on the first two movements in Switzerland during the summer of 1939. He hoped to complete the concerto in the early fall to meet the October 1st deadline, but his plans were interrupted due to World War II. In late August, he went to Paris and then took a ship to the USA, arriving in early September. After spending a short time with his family in West Chester, PA, he continued his work on the concerto in the Pocono Mountains.

In Barber's account, he continues that he gave Briselli "the completed first two movements (about 15 minutes of music)" in "the middle of October" and "he seemed disappointed that they were not of virtuoso character—a bit too easy." Barber then says he asked Briselli "what type of brilliant technique best suited him; he told me he had no preference." Barber continues: "At that time, he did not apparently dislike the idea of a 'perpetual motion' for the last movement." However, Briselli's account was that he liked the first two movements very much but suggested a more virtuosic third movement.

In mid-November, Briselli showed the two completed movements to his violin coach in New York City, Albert Meiff, who was immediately critical of the work from a violinistic standpoint. Meiff proceeded to write Fels a letter (November 13) in which he stated that the violin part had to undergo a "surgical operation", giving the reason that "[t]he technical embellishments are very far from the requirements of a modern violinist" and that the piece was unsuitable in its present state for performance by Briselli. Meiff said that he would rewrite the violin part in the two completed movements, and suggested that the third movement be written "with a knowledge of the instrument."

Prior to sending the third movement to Briselli, Barber (now teaching at the Curtis Institute) tested its playability by asking a Curtis student, Herbert Baumel, to study the finale for a couple of hours, then to join Barber in pianist Josef Hofmann's studio and play the movement for him. In a letter to Fels on December 14, Barber stated that he felt this test served as assurance that the movement was "practical and playable." Barber stated that he "worked very hard" on the last movement, finishing it "in far from ideal circumstances," and sent the violin part to Briselli about two months before the intended premiere. However, Briselli was disappointed when he received the third movement from Barber; according to Barber, his reasons were that "1st, he could not safely learn it for January; 2nd, it was not violinistic; 3rd, it did not suit musically the other two movements, it seemed to him rather inconsequential." He asked Barber if he would rewrite the finale to be premiered at a later date if necessary, suggesting ways to improve the movement such as expanding it into a sonata-rondo. Barber dismissed these suggestions and chose to keep his original finale, as he felt that he "could not destroy a movement in which I have complete confidence, out of artistic sincerity to myself," leading Briselli to give up his claim on the concerto. In the intended premiere performance, Briselli substituted Dvořák's Violin Concerto.

Meiff replied on December 26 to a handwritten note from Fels with a lengthy two-page letter outlining to Fels, "point by point," the problems which he found with the piece, including that it "hasn't got enough backbone—not strong, not majestic—does not contain enough dramatic moments, all of which make for a successful performance." He criticized the finale in particular, stating that it "was a dangerous thought from the very beginning, to make a perpetual motion movement ...without a breath of rest and without melodic parts...a risky tiresome ending...it was a wrong idea, and Mr. Barber should admit this."

The piece was privately performed in early 1940 by Baumel with the Curtis Institute Orchestra under Fritz Reiner. Following this performance, Eugene Ormandy scheduled its official premiere in a pair of performances by Albert Spalding with the Philadelphia Orchestra in the Academy of Music in February 1941. Those performances were followed on February 11, 1941, by a repeat performance in Carnegie Hall, and from that point, the piece rapidly entered the standard violin and orchestral repertoire, and has become one of the most frequently performed of all 20th-century concertos.

It received its UK premiere by Eda Kersey at a Proms concert in 1943.

== Music ==
The concerto has three movements:

1. Allegro
2. Andante
3. Presto in moto perpetuo

Barber provided these program notes for the premiere performance:

The first movement—allegro molto moderato—begins with a lyrical first subject announced at once by the solo violin, without any orchestral introduction. This movement as a whole has perhaps more the character of a sonata than concerto form. The second movement—andante sostenuto—is introduced by an extended oboe solo. The violin enters with a contrasting and rhapsodic theme, after which it repeats the oboe melody of the beginning. The last movement, a perpetuum mobile, exploits the more brilliant and virtuosic character of the violin.

The concerto is scored for two each of flutes, oboes, clarinets, bassoons, horns, and trumpets; timpani, snare drum, piano, and strings.

== Recordings ==
The concerto has been recorded and played by a number of violinists, including Augustin Hadelich, Louis Kaufman, Ruggiero Ricci, Elmar Oliveira, Leonid Kogan, Anne Akiko Meyers, Joshua Bell, Giora Schmidt, James Ehnes, Hilary Hahn, Itzhak Perlman, Johan Dalene, Gil Shaham and Isaac Stern. The version made in 1964 by Stern with the New York Philharmonic conducted by Leonard Bernstein remains a celebrated romantic interpretation, while the 1988 recording by Meyers with the Royal Philharmonic Orchestra has been highly praised. A transcription of the concerto for flute and orchestra was recorded and issued on the now defunct Collins Classics label and later re-released on the Regis label with Jennifer Stinton as the soloist.

== Sources ==
- Various correspondences of Fels, Barber, and Meiff quoted in the content and in-line cited: ,
- The Strad magazine—November 1995 (Barber's Violin Concerto: The True Story)
