= Symphony in One Movement (Barber) =

1936 composition by Samuel Barber

- Symphony by Samuel Barber
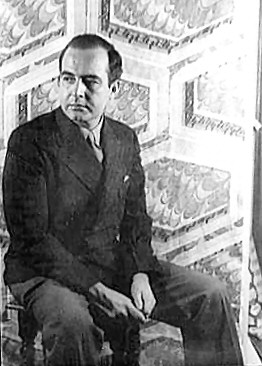
- Samuel Barber in 1944
- Opus: (Op. 9)
- Composed: 1935–36
- Dedication: Gian Carlo Menotti
- Duration: Approx. 21 minutes
- Movements: One (with four internal sections)

Premiere
- Location: Rome, Italy
- Conductor: Bernardino Molinari

Samuel Barber's First Symphony (in One Movement), as the printed score has its title, Opus 9, was completed on 24 February 1936 and first performed by the Philharmonic Augusteo Orchestra in Rome under the baton of Bernardino Molinari on 13 December the same year.

It lasts around 20 minutes.

== History ==
Barber commenced his work on the symphony in August 1935 and completed the work at the Anabel Taylor Foundation in Roquebrune in the French Alps. It was dedicated to his long-time companion Gian Carlo Menotti.

It received its American premiere by the Cleveland Orchestra, conducted by Rudolf Ringwall, on January 21 and 23, 1937, and it was performed three times on March 24 of the same year at Carnegie Hall, played by the New York Philharmonic–Symphony Orchestra under the direction of Artur Rodziński. Rodziński was a strong promoter of Barber's work, and he also conducted the Vienna Philharmonic's performance of the symphony at the opening concert of the 1937 Salzburg Festival. It was the first performance of a symphonic work by an American composer at the festival.

The symphony is also featured on the first LP recording produced by the Milwaukee Symphony Orchestra in 1974 under the direction of Kenneth Schermerhorn.

== Analysis ==
The symphony is a condensed one-movement version of a classical four-movement symphony and is modeled after Sibelius' Symphony No. 7. The work is divided into four sections:

1. Allegro ma non troppo
2. Allegro molto
3. Andante tranquillo
4. Con moto

In the program notes for the New York premiere Barber explained:

The form of my Symphony in One Movement is a synthetic treatment of the four-movement classical symphony. It is based on three themes of the initial Allegro non troppo, which retain throughout the work their fundamental character. The Allegro ma non troppo opens with the usual exposition of a main theme, a more lyrical second theme, and a closing theme. After a brief development of the three themes, instead of the customary recapitulation, the first theme in diminution forms the basis of a scherzo section (vivace). The second theme (oboe over muted strings) then appears in augmentation, in an extended Andante tranquillo. An intense crescendo introduces the finale, which is a short passacaglia based on the first theme (introduced by violoncelli and contrabassi), over which, together with figures from other themes, the closing theme is woven, thus serving as a recapitulation for the entire symphony.

Barber made some revisions to the work in 1942–43. The revised version was first performed 18 February 1944 by the Philadelphia Orchestra conducted by Bruno Walter, who also conducted the New York Philharmonic in the work the following month and recorded it with the orchestra for Columbia Records in January, 1945.

=== Allegro non troppo ===
Main theme (mm. 2–4)

Lyrical second theme (mm. 29–31)

Closing theme (mm. 61–64)

=== Scherzo ===
First theme in diminution (mm. 138–42)

=== Andante tranquillo ===
Second theme (mm. 437–445)

=== Passacaglia ===
First theme (mm. 522–27)
