= The School for Scandal (Barber) =

Concert overture by Samuel Barber

Overture to The School for Scandal, Op. 5, is a concert overture by Samuel Barber. It is Barber's first work for full orchestra, composed in 1931 while he was completing his studies at the Curtis Institute of Music in Philadelphia. The premiere was given on August 30, 1933 by the Philadelphia Orchestra conducted by Alexander Smallens. The overture helped to establish Barber's national reputation and became in the 1950s a more regular part of the repertoire of American orchestras. It won the Joseph H. Bearns Prize of Columbia University in 1933.

The title refers to the comedy The School for Scandal written by Richard Brinsley Sheridan and the overture by Barber intended to reflect the spirit of the play.

The instrumentation is as follows: piccolo, 2 flutes, 2 oboes, English horn, 2 clarinets, bass clarinet, 2 bassoons, 4 horns, 3 trumpets, 3 trombones, tuba, timpani, bass drum, cymbals, triangle, bells, celesta, harp, and strings. It is characterized by orchestral brilliance and a number of shifts in tempo and dynamics.

It lasts around 8 min.
