= Felix Knight =

American actor (1908–1998)

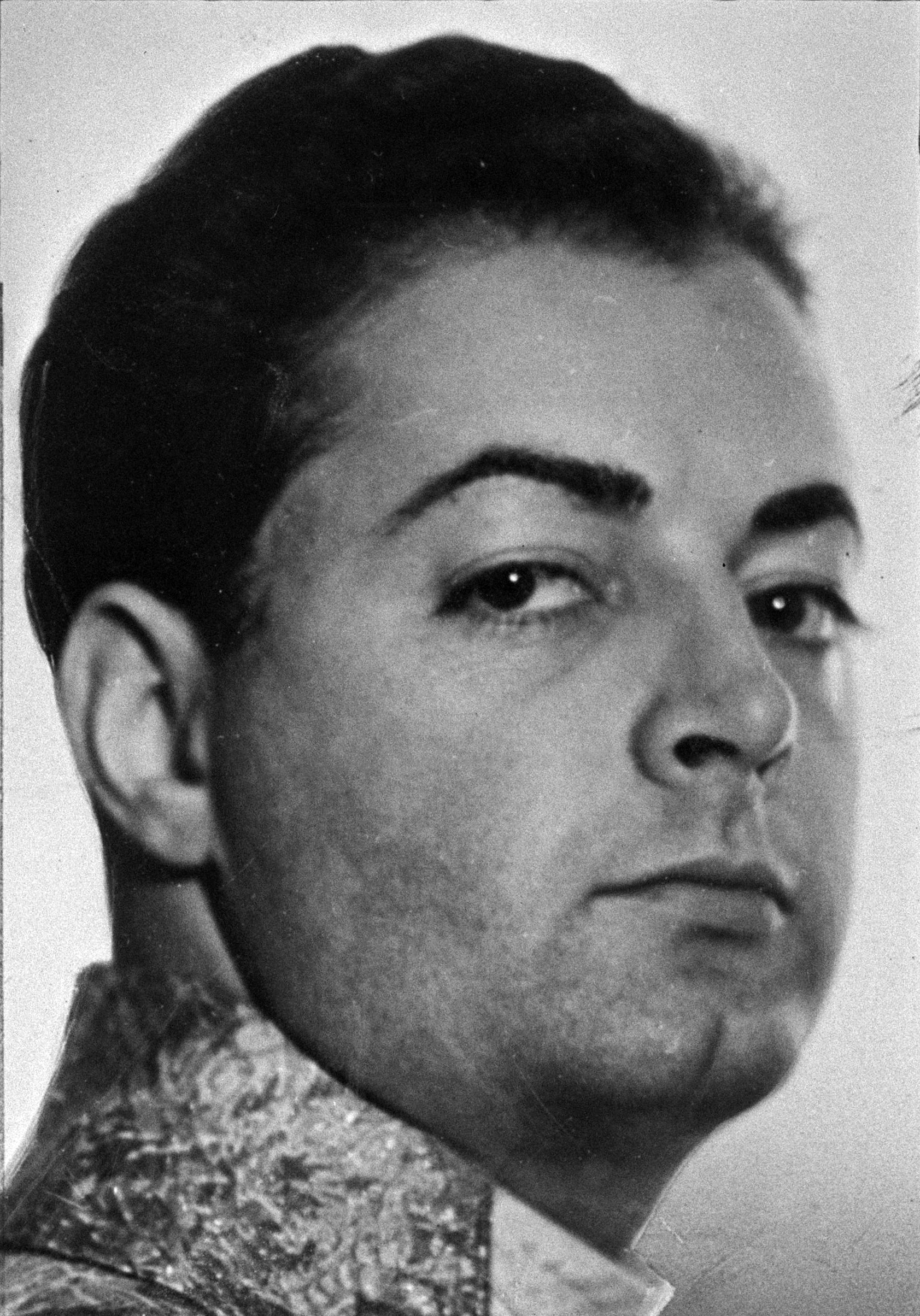
- Born: William Felix Knight; November 1, 1908; Macon, Georgia, U.S.
- Died: June 18, 1998 (aged 89); The Bronx, New York, U.S.
- Occupations: Actor, tenor, vocal teacher
- Years active: 1929–1998
- Known for: Tom-Tom in Babes in Toyland
- Spouses: Alice Moore (m. 1935; div. 1939) Ethel Blume (m. 1940)
- Children: 1

William Felix Knight (stage name: Felix Knight, November 1, 1908 – June 18, 1998), was an American tenor, actor, and vocal teacher, best known for his role as Tom-Tom in the 1934 Laurel and Hardy holiday musical film Babes in Toyland.

== Early life ==
William Felix Knight was born in Macon, Georgia, the son of a cotton farmer who died in a hunting accident when Knight was five. Seven years later, he moved with his family to Pensacola, Florida, where he began to play the guitar. By his mid-teens, Knight was singing at dances and nightspots. By 1925, he was featured on a local radio station, and a movie company manager on location at the time to make a feature film urged Knight to travel to and try his luck in California.

== Beginning of fame (1929–1934) ==
Knight found a vocal teacher in California, but was unable to earn a movie contract. To compensate, Knight did local singing jobs and church work, eventually gaining financial support from the Harkness Scholarship Foundation to aid in paying for his vocal lessons. By 1929, Knight was singing in a Santa Barbara, California Columbia network (later CBS) station, and additionally, had a national show, WCC Presents Felix Knight. Knight entered the Arwater Kent Foundation Scholarship Auditions of the Air, and made it to Manhattan prior to placing second in the judging.

Upon returning to California, Knight sang at the Hollywood Bowl in the Giuseppe Verdi opera La traviata alongside Lily Pons, and then traveled to San Francisco, California, where he did Hector Berlioz's La damnation de Faust with the city's opera company. Once he returned to Hollywood, he continued voice studying and radio work, including the CBS program Shell Mountain House with Raymond Paige and his Orchestra. He sang at a venue known for putting stage talent on display where movie people could see them, performing in a night of opera vignettes for the Harold Lloyd co-founded Beverly Hills Little Theatre for Professionals. Knight finally made his screen debut in 1934 in RKO Pictures Down to Their Last Yacht as a South Seas native who sings "Malakamokolu." Following this was the role of a gypsy in the Charles Boyer—Loretta Young picture Caravan, starring Boyer.

== Peak of fame (1934–1937) ==
Knight in his most famous role as Tom-Tom in Babes in Toyland

Knight's biggest and best-known role was as the love interest of Little Bo Peep, Tom-Tom, the Piper's Son, in the 1934 Laurel and Hardy musical film Babes in Toyland, based on the famed 1903 operetta by Victor Herbert. Not only did Knight play the romantic lead, but he also performed several musical numbers, including "A Castle in Spain." Despite being placed under a contract with MGM, Knight did no films directly for the studio. Rather, he was loaned out for other assignments, such as attending Warner Bros. for two musical shorts: Springtime in Holland (1935) and Carnival Day (1936). In the former, he was cast as a Dutch milk seller, and sang the numbers "The Girl on the Little Blue Plate" and "Beside the Zuider Zee". In Carnival Day, he played a jockey who romances a flower girl (Joan Barclay), and sang the numbers "The Rose in Her Hair" and "Steppin' Along." MGM released his next feature, The Bohemian Girl, but similar to Babes in Toyland, it was made by producer Hal Roach independently, and reunited Laurel and Hardy with Knight; the feature also gave Knight a small role—a gypsy singer who performs a number from the Michael William Balfe—Alfred Bunn opera of 1843. A test Knight had done for Roach ended up in Pick a Star, an MGM musical comedy film that also featured Laurel and Hardy in a non-speaking guest bit; Knight was briefly seen as a nightclub singer. Even though he studied acting with Irving Pichel, no further film opportunities came to Knight, other than a potential film series in Australia that in time, failed to materialize.

== Life in New York and later life (1937–1960s) ==
Knight moved to New York City in 1937. There, he made radio recordings for Thesaurus Transcriptions with Nathaniel Shilkret and his Orchestra, and a year later, he recorded nine songs for Victor Records with Leo Reisman's orchestra. He also started to perform on network radio again, first with the Schaefer All-Star Parade on NBC, which ran from 1938 to 1940, as well as the NBC Blue Network's Music Appreciation Hour in 1938, and the RCA Magic Key [The Magic Key] during the 1938–39 season. Knight also had a weekly program on the radio station WEAF (later known as WNBC (AM)) every Thursday. In 1938, he was one of the finalists on NBC's Metropolitan Opera Auditions of the Air, losing to John Carter by a single vote. In 1939, he made his concert recital debut at The Town Hall, singing selections from Johannes Brahms, Francesco Cavalli, Alessandro Stradella, and Richard Strauss. Knight made his Broadway debut in October 1940 as the featured singer in It Happens on Ice, and in 1942, he sang the role of Camile de Jolidon in Franz Lehár's The Merry Widow at Carnegie Hall. In his final Broadway role, he played Almaviva in Once Over Lightly in 1942 with Igor Gorin and Grace Panvini; the production was based on Gioachino Rossini's The Barber of Seville.

In 1940, Knight again recorded for Victor Records, and continued to be heard on radio in musical programs such as The Ford Sunday Evening Hour, and Music Hall of the Air (Radio City Music Hall), and the game program So You Think You Know Music. Knight also served in World War II, and was present at Guadalcanal.

1946 was an eventful and prosperous year for Knight. Not only did he continue to be very active in radio, but he also signed with Decca Records and became a member of the Metropolitan Opera. While at Decca, he recorded operettas and popular songs, and was a vocalist with the Guy Lombardo and Russ Morgan orchestras. For his debut at the Met, Knight sang the role of Count Almaviva in Il barbiere di Siviglia, the same role he did in the English-language version of the opera Once Over Lightly four years prior. He remained at the Met until 1950, but also continued to appear on radio in series including The Pet Milk Show and The American Album of Familiar Music.

A 1947 promotional photo of Knight (left) as Belmonte and Eleanor Steber (right) as Constanze in Die Entführung aus dem Serail

Knight had his television series, Felix Knight Sings, in the early 1950s, airing every Tuesday and Thursday afternoon. His other television work included appearances on NBC Television Concert Hall in 1948, singing Rodolfo's aria from La bohème on Your Show of Shows in April 1950, and performing Christmas hymns on a holiday edition of Juvenile Jury in December 1951. During this time, Knight also created more records for RCA Victor including the tenor roles in excerpts from Victor Herbert operettas with soprano Doretta Morrow.

After leaving the Met, Knight appeared for two months at the Capitol Theatre, then spent the next several years giving concerts (appearing with the Philadelphia Orchestra and the Detroit Symphony Orchestra, among others), performing in summer stock, and working supper- and nightclubs. In 1960, he and Mimi Benzell did an album from the musicals Can-Can and Kiss Me, Kate for Design Records. On television, Knight was an occasional guest on late-night talk programs such as The Jack Paar Show in September 1961.

Toward the end of the 1960s, Knight had grown fatigued of constant traveling and launched yet another music career, this time, as a vocal teacher. His students included both Broadway and opera singers, and he continued to teach for the remainder of his life. Knight was a member of the Founding Tent of the Sons of the Desert, the Laurel and Hardy international society, and he attended several of their conventions.

== Personal life ==
=== Marriage and children ===
While on the set of Babes in Toyland, Knight fell in love with fellow co-star Alice Moore, who played the Queen of Hearts. They eloped to Yuma, Arizona and married there on October 17, 1935. They divorced on March 14, 1939.

In 1940, Knight married Ethel Blume, a radio actress who appeared on The Adventures of Helen, The Aldrich Family, Easy Aces, John's Other Wife, and Joyce Jordan, M.D. The two had one child, William Felix Knight II, who at one point would star in an episode of Juvenile Jury in 1951.

== Death ==
Knight died on June 18, 1998, at Calvary Hospital in the Bronx, New York City. Not long before his death, Knight told writer Laura Wagner (Classic Images, June 1998): "I did my best, I tried to be a nice guy. I helped people whenever I could, and I never complained. ... For a country boy from a cotton patch in Macon, Georgia—I think I did pretty good."

== Filmography ==
=== Film ===
Year	Title	Role	Notes
1934	Caravan	Gypsy Singer	Uncredited, Also appeared in the French-language version
1934	Down to Their Last Yacht	Island Singer	Uncredited, Screen debut, sang "Malakamokolu"
1934	Caravan	Chanteur	Uncredited
1934	Babes in Toyland	Tom-Tom	Best-known role, first collaboration with Laurel and Hardy and Hal Roach
1935	Springtime in Holland	Dutch milk seller	Short, sang "The Girl on the Little Blue Plate" and "By the Zuider Zee"
1936	Carnival Day	Bobby	Short, sang "The Rose in Her Hair" and "Steppin' Along"
1936	The Bohemian Girl	Gypsy Singer	Second collaboration with Laurel and Hardy and Hal Roach, sang "Then You'll Remember Me"
1937	Pick a Star	Nightclub Singer	Uncredited, Third collaboration with Laurel and Hardy (final film role)
1937	Musical Movieland	Young Dutchman	Short, Uncredited, (archived footage)

=== Television ===
Year	Title	Role	Notes
1929	WCC Presents Felix Knight	Himself	National show
1948	NBC Television Concert Hall	Himself	Multiple appearances
1950s	Felix Knight Sings	Host	Own television series, aired on Tuesday and Thursday afternoons
1950	Your Show of Shows	Himself – Guest Vocalist	Aired in April, sang Rodolfo's aria from La bohème
1951	Cavalcade of Stars	Himself – Guest Vocalist	Season 2 episode 45, aired July 13
1951	Juvenile Jury	Himself – Guest Vocalist	Aired in December, special holiday edition, performed Christmas hymns
1961	The Jack Paar Show	Himself	Aired in September
1962	The Tonight Show	Himself	Aired August 16
1985	Due Teste Senza Cervello	Himself	Documentary by it:Giancarlo Governi, English translation: "Two Minds Without a Single Thought", featured in portion showing the New York Founding Tent of Sons of the Desert meeting from November 1, 1984 (Knight's 76th birthday)
1986	The Laurel and Hardy Show	Singer	Archived footage
1987	The Revenge of the Sons of the Desert	Himself	Video documentary short

=== Stage ===
Year	Title	Role	Notes
1940–1941	It Happens on Ice	Featured singer	Broadway debut, 279 performances
1942	The Merry Widow	Camile de Jolidon	39 performances at Carnegie Hall
1942	Once Over Lightly	Almaviva	Last Broadway role, six performances with Igor Gorin and Grace Pavini, based on The Barber of Seville
1946	Il barbiere di Siviglia	Count Almaviva	Met debut, two performances: November 30 and December 27
1946	Lakmé	Gérald	Two performances: January 18 and May 1, latter performance in Dallas, Texas
1947	The Warrior	Philistine Lord	Two performances: January 11 and 31
1947	Die Meistersinger von Nürnberg	Zorn	In English, performance on February 26
1947	Die Entführung aus dem Serail	Belmonte	In English, performance on March 3
1947	Parsifal	First Knight	Performance on March 13
1947	Die Zauberflöte	Priest	Three performances: November 14, December 3, and December 20
1947	Lucia di Lammermoor	Arturo	Two performances: December 16 and 29
1947	Il barbiere di Siviglia	Count Almaviva	Performance on December 21
1948	Il barbiere di Siviglia	Count Almaviva	Six performances: January 7, January 20 (at the American Academy of Music in Philadelphia, Pennsylvania), January 29, February 16, February 28, and December 28
1948	Lucia di Lammermoor	Arturo	Three performances: January 17, February 21, March 21, the latter at the Boston Opera House
1948	Die Zauberflöte	Priest	Three performances: January 22, February 9, and March 24
1948	Gala Performance	Almaviva in The Barber of Seville: Act II	Met Concert at the Metropolitan Opera House
1948	Parsifal	First Knight	Two performances: March 10 and 26
1949	Lucia di Lammermoor	Arturo	Four performances: January 1, February 22, February 25, and December 27
1949	Il barbiere di Siviglia	Count Almaviva	Five performances: March 11, April 2 (at the Boston Opera House), April 9 (at the Public Auditorium in Cleveland, Ohio), April 30 (at the Shrine Auditorium in Los Angeles), and May 14 (at the Northrup Auditorium in Minneapolis, Minnesota)
1950	Lucia di Lammermoor	Arturo	Last performance at the Met

=== Radio ===
Year	Title	Role	Notes
1938	Gems From Gershwin	Performer	Originally broadcast July 10 as a memorial honoring George Gershwin on the eve of the first anniversary of his death, also included Jane Froman, Sonny Schuyler, and the Victor Salon Group, conducted by Nathaniel Shilkret, broadcast was medley of Gershwin tunes from Porgy and Bess
1945	The Andre Kostelanetz Show	Performer	Originally broadcast May 21, also included Eleanor Steber, conducted by Noël Coward, sang "Someday I'll Find You" alongside Steber
1990	The Nutty Nut News Network	Himself	Audio interview with Knight recorded at the Sons 7th International Convention in Clearwater, Florida

=== Soundtrack ===
Year	Title	Role	Notes
1934	Babes in Toyland	Performer (uncredited)	"Never Mind, Bo Peep", "Castle In Spain", "Go To Sleep"
1935	Springtime in Holland	Performer (uncredited)	"Beside the Zuider Zee"; short
1936	Carnival Day	Performer (uncredited)	"The Rose in Her Hair"; short
1936	The Bohemian Girl	Performer (uncredited)	"Then You'll Remember Me"
1937	Pick a Star	Performer (uncredited)	"I've Got It Bad"
1938	Love Walked In	Performer	Recorded on February 11 by Leo Reisman, released on Victor 27626 and included in the 78rpm album "Leo Reisman Rhythms"
1938	Spring Is Here	Performer	Recorded on May 5 by Leo Reisman, released on Victor 25842 and included in the 78 rpm album "Spring Is Here"
1942	The Merry Widow	Camile de Jolidon	Alongside Kitty Carlisle, Wilbur Evans, and Lisette Verea, released February 1, 2011
1944	Musical Movieland	Performer (uncredited)	"Beside the Zuider Zee"; short
1945	The Red Mill	Performer	Through Decca Records, performed alongside Eileen Farrell, and Wilbur Evans, with a chorus and orchestra conducted by Jay Blackton
1946	A Little Bit of Heaven – A collection of Irish songs sung and played in waltz time	Performer	Through Decca Records, music played by Russ Morgan and his orchestra, with a mixed chorus directed by Jeffry Alexander
1949	The Desert Song	Performer	Alongside Kitty Carlisle and Wilbur Evans
1953	Mademoiselle Modiste / Naughty Marietta	Performer	Alongside Doretta Morrow
1955	Vintage Vocal Jazz / Swing Nº 61 – EPs Collectors, "Giannina Mia"	Performer	"A Dream" and "Giannina Mía"
1960	Can-Can / Kiss Me, Kate	Performer	Alongside Mimi Benzell
