= Carola Goya =

American dancer, choreographer, and teacher

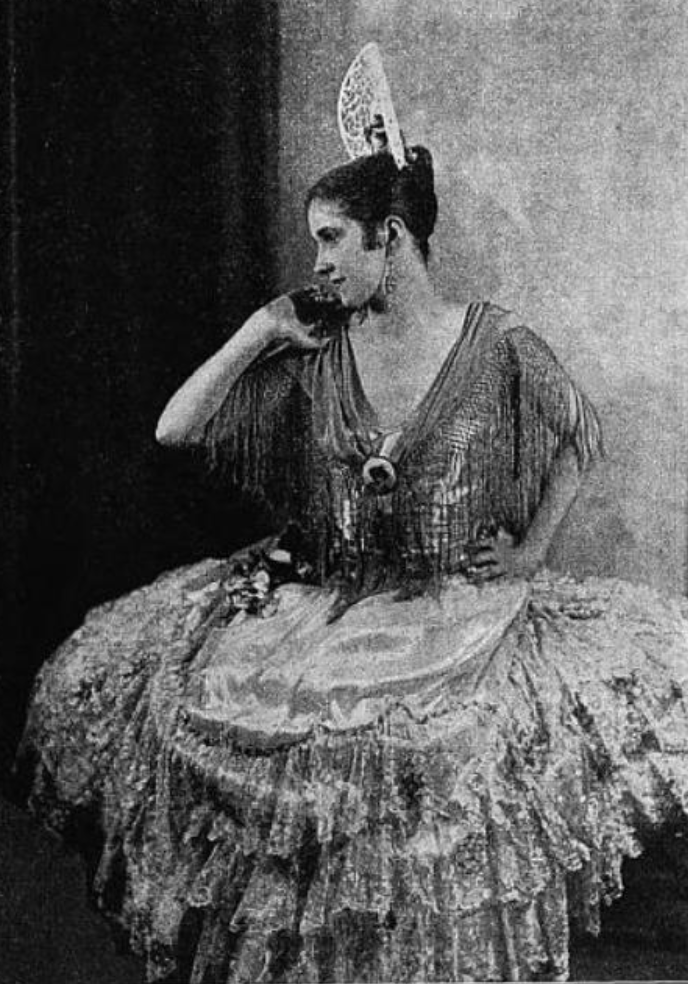
- Carola Goya, from a 1929 publication
- Born: Carol Weller; 1906; New York, New York, U.S.
- Died: May 13, 1994 (age 88); New York, New York, U.S.
- Occupation(s): Dancer, choreographer, dance scholar and educator
- Spouse: Matteo Vittucci

Carola Goya Vittucci (April 5, 1906 – May 13, 1994), born Carol Weller, was an American dancer, choreographer, and teacher who specialized in the study and performance of Spanish dance.

== Early life and education ==
Goya was born in New York City, the daughter of Samuel MacLeary Weller and Hortense Carroll Kellogg Weller (also known as Hortense d'Arblay). Her father was an actors' agent and theatrical publicist from Texas, who rode with Theodore Roosevelt's Rough Riders as a young man. Her sister Beatrice Burford was a professional harpist. Upon entering the professional dance world, Goya assumed a Spanish last name; her stage name later became her legal name. She trained as a dancer at the Metropolitan Opera Ballet School under Michel Fokine, and in Seville, Spain, with Manuel de Castillo Otero.

== Career ==
Goya performed professionally with the Metropolitan Opera Ballet as well as with the José Greco Dance Company. "Senorita Goya is a talented and pretty dancer. Her charm lies in her romantic personality, dramatic grasp of composition and intelligent feeling for rhythm. She has a splendid body and a lively temperament", dance critic Ivan Narodny wrote in 1929, while questioning the authenticity of her Spanish dances.

Goya is considered to be the first solo castanets performer. In addition to performing solo, Goya performed with numerous symphony orchestras, such as the Detroit Symphony Orchestra and the Kansas City Philharmonic. She toured in the United States and Canada in the 1930s, with her sister as her accompanist, and danced at the White House in 1936. At the end of 1936, she and her father were stranded in Granada, during "the maelstrom of Spanish insurrection."

In 1954 she formed a dance partnership with American ethnic-dancer Matteo Vittucci. Together they founded the Indo-American Dance Company (the company also performed under the names Foundation for Ethnic Dance and the Matteo Ethno-American Dance Theater). Goya also served on the faculties of Connecticut College, Jacob’s Pillow, and the High School of Performing Arts in New York, among others.

== Publications ==
- "The Truth About Spanish Dancing" (1933)
- The Language of Spanish Dance (1990, with Matteo Vittucci)

== Personal life ==
Goya and Vittucci married in 1974. She died in 1994, at the age of 88, in New York City.
