= William Hargrave (bass-baritone) =

William Kossuth Hargrave (June 28, 1900 – November 29, 1986) was an American bass-baritone, actor, and voice teacher. He worked as a church and radio singers in Philadelphia prior to making his stage debut as Emile in the national tour of Rose-Marie in 1925. He was active as a radio, church, oratorio, and operetta singer in California during the 1930s. He had roles in the Broadway musicals Tattle Tales (1933) and Saluta (1934). In 1944 he won the Metropolitan Opera Auditions of the Air and was a singer with the Metropolitan Opera from 1944 to 1947. He later was a voice professor at Howard Payne College in Texas, and music director of First Baptist Church in Culver City, California.

== Early life and education ==
The son of Herbert and Nellie Hargrave, William Kossuth Hargrave was born in Philadelphia, Pennsylvania on June 28, 1900. He had three brothers and one sister. His father worked as a Baptist minister, and ended his career as a pastor.

Hargrave studied at Temple University School of Law and was trained as an airline pilot at Essington Avation School. He was a singer on the music staff of St. Stephen's Episcopal Church, Philadelphia for four years during the early 1920s. By February 1923 he was performing in concerts broadcast on WIP-AM in Philadelphia. The following summer he competed as a pilot in sea-plane races held off the coast of Atlantic City, New Jersey.

== Career ==
Hargrave began his stage career in 1925 touring nationally in the role of Emile in the operetta Rose-Marie. After this he sang for two seasons in the chorus of the Philadelphia Civic Opera Company and was also a singer with the Mendelssohn Club. In 1926 he was elected a member of the Philadelphia Stock Exchange. By August 1927 he was in Long Beach, California working as a singer for KGER radio. He was the bass soloist in Handel's Messiah with the Haydn-Handel Society in Long Beach in December 1927. He subsequently was a singer at Neighborhood Unitarian Church in Pasadena in the late 1920s.

In 1931 Hargrave starred in Adolf Tandler's operetta Co-Eds put on by the Los Angeles Opera (no relation to the current company). He was employed as a singer KHJ radio in Los Angeles in 1932. In 1933 he starred alongside Barbara Stanwyck in the Broadway musical revue Tattle Tales. In December 1933 he performed in a festival of music by Reginald De Koven at Carnegie Hall with the New York Light Opera Guild. In 1934 he returned to Broadway to portray multiple roles in the musical Saluta at the Imperial Theatre.

In 1936 Hargrave became a principal singer with Alfredo Salmaggi's New York Hippodrome Opera Company (NYHOC); making his debut with the NYHOC at the Brooklyn Academy of Music as the King in Giuseppe Verdi's Aida in April 1936 with Mina Horn making her American debut in the title role. He subsequently performed with the company at the New York Hippodrome in 1937 as Sparafucile in Rigoletto and Germont in La traviata. He was still active with the NYHOC as late as 1940 when he repeated the role of Germont with the company at Mecca Auditorium (now New York City Center).

He won the Metropolitan Opera Auditions of the Air in 1944 and that same year made his debut at the Metropolitan Opera as a Nobleman in Lohengrin. On January 11, 1947 he portrayed one of the Captains in the world premiere of Bernard Rogers and Norman Corwin's The Warrior at the Metropolitan Opera House. He was a singer at the Met through 1947. Other roles he sang with the Met included Donner in Das Rheingold, the Duke of Verona in Roméo et Juliette, Ferrando in Il trovatore, the Imperial Commissioner in Madama Butterfly, the Marchese d'Obigny in La traviata, Monk in La Gioconda, Montano in Otello, Monterone in Rigoletto, Osmin in Die Entführung aus dem Serail, the Steersman in Tristan und Isolde, the Thief in Lakmé, and Zuniga in Carmen.

After leaving from the Met he worked as a voice teacher in Dallas and Fort Worth, Texas. He joined the voice faculty at Southwestern Baptist Theological Seminary in 1947. He began concurrently teaching voice at Howard Payne College (HPC) in Brownsville, Texas in 1948. While teaching he occasionally continued to perform; including playing Zuniga in Carmen at the Shreveport Opera in 1949. He was also the conductor of the Fort Worth Commandery Choir in the 1950s. He was still teaching as a voice professor at HPC as late as 1961 at the time that he performed the tile role of Felix Mendelssohn's Elijah at the University of Tampa.

In 1962 Hargrave was appointed music director at First Baptist Church in Culver City, California where his father had previously pastored.

== Personal life and death ==
In 1932 Hargrave married the pianist Virginia Pohlman. They divorced in 1936. He married his second wife, Muriel Kloeblen, in New Jersey in 1940. He had three sons with his second wife.

Hargrave died at Veterans Administration Hospital in Sepulveda, Los Angeles, California on November 29, 1986.
