= John Garris (tenor) =

Hans Gareis, known by the stage name John Garris, (7 November 1911 – 21 April 1949) was a German tenor, pianist, and conductor. A child piano prodigy, he began performing professionally as a concert pianist and accompanist in Germany as a teenager. He trained as a pianist and conductor in Frankfurt, and began his career working as an assistant conductor and répétiteur in opera houses in Frankfurt and Munich. In 1938 he went to Greece, and in 1941 he immigrated to the United States where he settled in New York City. He was a tenor with the Metropolitan Opera ("the Met") from 1942 until 1949. He was murdered at the age of 37 in Atlanta while on a tour with the Met.

== Early life in Germany ==
The son of baritone Joseph Gareis, Hans Gareis was born on 7 November 1911 in Frankfurt am Main. His father had a lengthy career with Oper Frankfurt, and his mother was also an opera singer. He was a child prodigy on the piano, and began performing as a teenager as first an accompanist and then a concert pianist. He completed studies in piano and conducting at the Hoch Conservatory before joining the staffs of Oper Frankfurt and the Bavarian State Opera in Munich as an assistant conductor and répétiteur.

== Greece and coming to the United States ==
In 1938 Gareis left Germany and settled in Greece; traveling to that country with his close friend Lutz Peter Uhlfelder to flee Nazi Germany. Without having had any vocal training, he appeared in two song programs on Radio Athens and sang the tenor solo a production of Haydn's The Creation in Athens. He worked as a singer in Athens until leaving for the United States in early April 1941 just days before the German invasion of Greece. Because of his German background he was interrogated by the FBI after arriving in America, but was released. He americanized his name to John Garris not long after arriving in the country.

Garris and Uhlfelder settled in Manhattan and lived together in an apartment on 57th St. In New York he studied singing with Mario Rubini-Reichlin. He quickly became a member of Lytle Hull's New Opera Company with whom he performed in the 1941-1942 season. In November 1941 he sang in the chorus of the Broadway revival of Offenbach's La Vie parisienne at the 44th Street Theatre, In 1943 he performed with the San Francisco Opera as Ernesto in Don Pasquale and Lord Arturo Bucklaw in Lucia di Lammermoor, and later returned as both Gonzalve in L'heure espagnole and Simpleton in Boris Godunov in 1945.

== Metropolitan Opera ==
On February 27, 1942 Garris made his debut with the Metropolitan Opera as the First Knight in Richard Wagner's Parsifal with Lauritz Melchior in the title role. Later that year he sang with the company under conductor George Szell as Narraboth in Salome (1942) and Walther von der Vogelweide in Tannhäuser. He remained mainly character tenor with the Met for a total of seven seasons; also occasionally singing buffo tenor and lyric tenor parts.

Garris sang on several Metropolitan Opera radio broadcasts recorded live from the Met's stage; including performances of Monostatos in The Magic Flute (26 December 1942), Simpleton in Boris Godunov (13 February 1943), David in Die Meistersinger von Nürnberg (10 February 1945), Jaquino in Fidelio (17 March 1945), the young sailor in Tristan und Isolde (30 November 1946), Samson and Delilah (11 January 1947), Pedrillo in Die Entführung aus dem Serail (18 January 1947), and The Rev Horace Adams in Peter Grimes (13 March 1948). Some of these recordings were later released on CD.

On January 11, 1947 Garris portrayed one of the Captains in the world premiere of Bernard Rogers and Norman Corwin's The Warrior. Some of his other roles at the Met included Don Curzio in The Marriage of Figaro, Mime in Der Ring des Nibelungen, Prince Vasiliy Ivanovich Shuysky in Boris Godunov, and Valzacchi in Der Rosenkavalier. On November 29, 1948 he performed in the first opera to be televised from the Metropolitan Opera House; portraying Cassio in Otello with Ramón Vinay in the title role and Leonard Warren as Iago.

== Recordings and other performances ==
For Paramount Pictures he performed the duet "Libiamo ne' lieti calici" from Giuseppe Verdi's La traviata with soprano Theodora Lynch in the film The Lost Weekend (1945). He sang Gastone de Letorières in a complete recording of that same opera made with conductor Arturo Toscanini and the NBC Symphony Orchestra & Chorus (NBCSOC) in 1946. His fellow soloists included Licia Albanese, Jan Peerce, and Robert Merrill. He was the tenor soloist in a 1947 recording of Berlioz's Roméo et Juliette made with Toscanini and the NBCSOC for RCA Victor. His fellow soloists were Gladys Swarthout and Nicola Moscona.

His other records include the quintet from Die Meistersinger von Nürnberg on Columbia Records (with Polyna Stoska, Herta Glaz, Torsten Ralf and Herbert Janssen), and Don Curzio in The Marriage of Figaro released for the Bruno Walter Society.

== Death ==
In April 1949 Garris toured with the Met to Atlanta, Georgia where he performed the roles of Laerte in Mignon (with Risë Stevens in the title role), and Cassio in Otello. While on this tour he was murdered in Atlanta on April 21, 1949. He was shot in the chest and his body was dumped in an alley for a reason that was never discovered. The murder happened just as the Met company was leaving on a train to Dallas, and the opera troupe did not learn of the event until they were in Texas. A memorial service was held for Garris at the Fair Park Auditorium which was across from the Cotton Bowl where the Met was performing.

Garris was gay, and was just 37 years old when he was killed. At the time of his death he was in a relationship with the dancer Matthew Vittuci. Vittucci, who was devastated by Garris's death, was interrogated extensively by the police even though he was in California at the time of the murder.
