= Thomas Hayward (tenor) =

American operatic tenor

Thomas T. Hayward
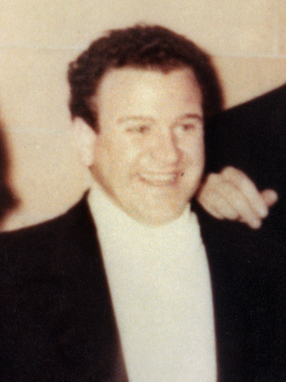
- Hayward in the 1950s

Background information
- Born: Thomas Albert Tibbett; December 1, 1917; Kansas City, Missouri, U.S.
- Died: August 8, 1995 (aged 77) Las Vegas, Nevada, U.S.
- Genre: Opera
- Occupation: Tenor
- Years active: 1944–1963
- Label: RCA

Thomas T. Hayward (born Thomas Albert Tibbett; December 1, 1917, Kansas City, Missouri – died February 2, 1995, Las Vegas, Nevada) was an American operatic tenor. He was a cousin of opera singer Lawrence Tibbett.

== Career ==
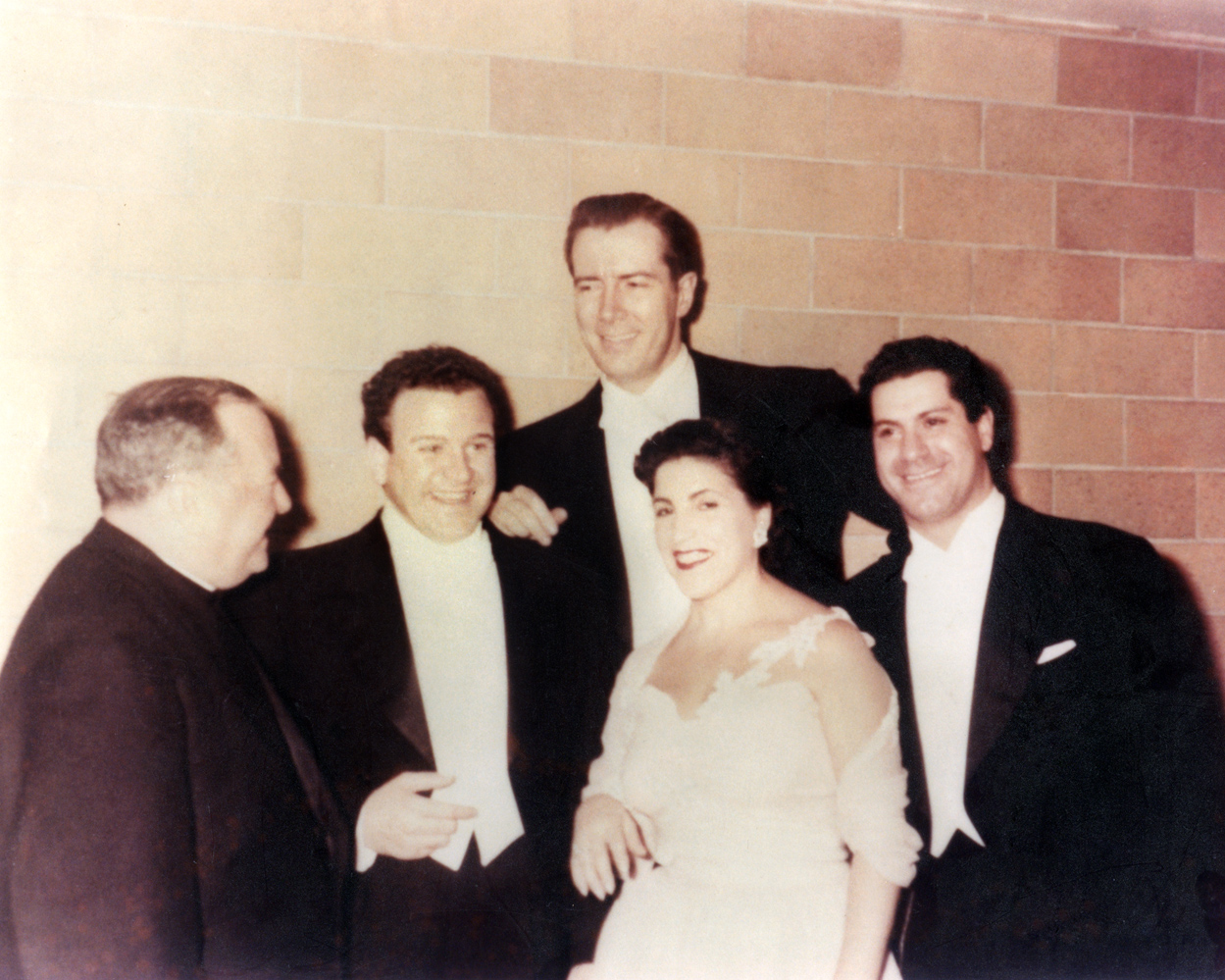
Hayward, second from left, pictured with his Metropolitan Opera colleagues, Licia Albanese, Frank Guarrera (far right) and Jerome Hines.

The lyric tenor made his debut with the New York City Opera in November 1944, as Edmondo in Giacomo Puccini's Manon Lescaut, opposite Dorothy Kirsten in the title role.

In 1945 and 1946, he was seen there as Turiddu in Cavalleria rusticana and in The Gypsy Baron. Soon after his City Opera debut, he won the Metropolitan Opera Auditions of the Air along with baritone Robert Merrill. Immediately following, Hayward was first seen in his many appearances at the Metropolitan Opera, his debut being the part of Tybalt in Roméo et Juliette. In 1947 he portrayed one of the captains in the world premiere of Bernard Rogers's The Warrior.

More notable roles at the Met included the Italian Singer in Der Rosenkavalier, Alfred in Die Fledermaus (with Hilde Gueden and Virginia MacWatters), the name part in Faust, "B.F. Pinkerton" in Madama Butterfly, opposite the "Cio Cio San" of Victoria de los Angeles and the Duke of Mantua in Rigoletto. His additional duties at the Met included being the principal cover for Jussi Bjoerling. His final opera at that theatre was Mario Cavaradossi in Tosca, in 1957. In 1959, he returned to the City Opera, for Die Fledermaus, conducted by Julius Rudel. In 1963, Hayward appeared in a production by Sarah Caldwell for the Boston Opera Group of Faust, with Beverly Sills and Norman Treigle,

== Concert stage ==
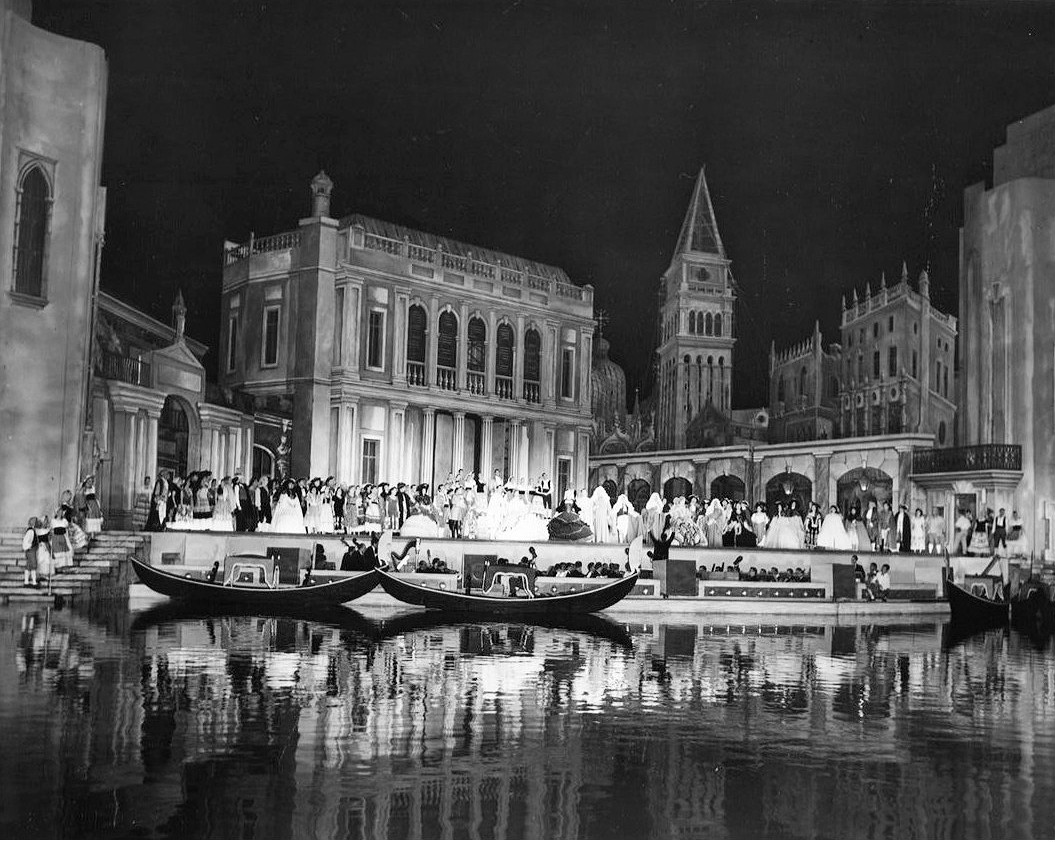
First act finale from A Night in Venice The production was replete with a cast of 500 and fireworks.

He performed to highest critical acclaim in over 400 civic concerts and appeared with every major symphony orchestra in the United States and Canada. His performances on open-air stages included the Hollywood Bowl, Chicago's Grant Park, Denver's Red Rocks, New York's Lewisohn Stadium, Jones Beach Marine Theater starring Hayward in the opening cast as "Mario" in the show that was the operetta A Night in Venice by Johann Strauss II (produced by film producer Mike Todd, complete with floating gondolas and starring Enzo Stuarti and Nola Fairbanks at the newly constructed Jones Beach Theater/), the Los Angeles Civic Light Opera and the Pittsburgh Civic Light Opera

== Radio and television ==
For many years he was the star of his own radio show Serenade to America broadcast from New York City on the NBC network. He was in demand as a guest star on The Voice of Firestone, The Bell Telephone Hour, The Ford Sunday Evening Hour, Producers' Showcase, NBC Symphony, Omnibus, and The Milton Berle Show. His debut abroad was at the Palladium in London where he was a featured guest artist at the gala and was invited to perform on Val Parnell's programme, Sunday Night at the London Palladium

=== Recordings ===
Hayward's studio discography includes RCA, Victor, Cambridge, Everest and Decca in addition to two recordings for CBS: Pagliacci (as Beppe, opposite Lucine Amara, Richard Tucker and Giuseppe Valdengo (1951), and Lucia di Lammermoor (as Lord Arturo Bucklaw, with Lily Pons and Richard Tucker, 1954). Both albums were conducted by Fausto Cleva. In 1998, Video Artists International published a compact disc of excerpts from a 1958 performance of La traviata, from New Orleans, Louisiana, with Kirsten and Cornell MacNeil, which displays the voice in his prime.

=== Teaching career and legacy ===
In 1964, Hayward left New York for Dallas, Texas, where he became Artist-in-Residence and Chairman of the Voice and Opera Departments of the Meadows School of the Arts at Southern Methodist University. He was further honored by being named the Meadows Distinguished Professor of Voice in 1990, and soon after his death in 1995 the establishment of the Thomas Hayward Memorial Award.

== Notable protégés ==
- Fernando del Valle
- Donnie Ray Albert
- Gary Lakes
- Jeff Harnar
- Jay Hunter Morris

== Death ==
Hayward continued teaching in Dallas until 1994. He died on February 2, 1995, from kidney and heart failure, when he and his wife moved to Nevada. He was 77.
