= Eleanor Steber =

American opera singer (1914-1990)

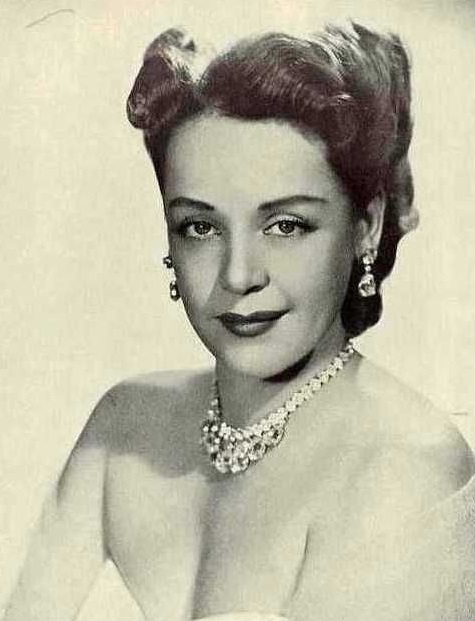
- Steber in 1952.

Background information
- Born: July 17, 1914; Wheeling, West Virginia, U.S.
- Died: October 3, 1990 (aged 76) Langhorne, Pennsylvania, U.S.
- Occupation: Opera singer (soprano)
- Years active: 1940–1990
- Labels: RCA Victor, Columbia, VAI
- Spouses: Edwin Lee Bilby (m. 1938; div. 1954); Gordon Andrews (m. 1958; div. 1967)

Eleanor Steber (July 17, 1914 – October 3, 1990) was an American soprano and voice teacher. She was particularly celebrated for her performances in the operas of Wolfgang Amadeus Mozart and Richard Strauss. A native of West Virginia, she was educated at the New England Conservatory of Music in Boston where she began her performance career in the 1930s. She made her opera debut in 1936 at the Boston Opera House as Senta in Richard Wagner's The Flying Dutchman.

In 1940 Steber won the Metropolitan Opera Auditions of the Air competition which garnered her a contract with the Metropolitan Opera ("the Met"). She was a leading soprano at the Met for 22 continuous years during which time she gave more than 400 performances in more than 30 roles. Disagreements between Steber and the Met's director Rudolph Bing led up to his decision not to renew Steber's contract after a December 1962 performance as Donna Anna in Don Giovanni. She later returned to the Met in 1966 for a final opera appearance as Minnie in Puccini's La Fanciulla del West.

Steber's career was mainly based in the United States, and she only made a relatively small number of appearances abroad. These included performances at the Bayreuth Festival, the Edinburgh Festival, the Glyndebourne Festival, the Maggio Musicale Fiorentino, and the Salzburg Festival. She was a charter member of the Lyric Opera of Chicago when it was founded in 1954. She performed the title role in Puccini's Tosca during the company's first season, and performed regularly with the company during the 1950s. She also worked as a guest artist with other American opera companies into the 1970s; including performances with the San Francisco Opera and the Santa Fe Opera. She was a prolific recording artist; performing on more than 100 albums.

Steber was the head of the voice department at the Cleveland Institute of Music from 1963 to 1972, and later taught voice on the faculties of the Juilliard School and Brooklyn College.

== Early life ==
The daughter of William Charles Steber, Sr, and Ida Amelia (née Nolte) Steber, Eleanor Steber was born in Wheeling, West Virginia on July 17, 1914. Her paternal grandfather anglicized the family name from Stuber to Steber. Her father was a bank teller. She was the oldest of three children in the Steber family; with her siblings including William Charles Jr. (born 1917) and Lucile (born 1918). For the first three years of her life she lived above the general store owned and operated by her grandparents in Wheeling. When she was four years old the Steber family moved to Warwood, West Virginia.

As a child, Steber studied piano and singing with her mother who was a music teacher and church musician. Her mother performed locally as a soprano, pianist, and church organist. She sang her first church solo at the age of 4, and attended Warwood High School (WHS) where she performed in school plays. She obtained her first paid job as a singer while in high school; working as the resident soprano at Second Presbyterian Church in Wheeling from the age of 16. She graduated from WHS in 1931, and then spent the next two years studying drama at the Idabel Waggoner School of Dramatic Art in Wheeling.

== New England Conservatory and first marriage ==
Steber's mother was responsible for pushing Eleanor into a more competitive conservatory outside of West Virginia; an academic pursuit her father opposed. It was her mother who selected the New England Conservatory of Music (NECM) in Boston, and encouraged her daughter to pursue training as a concert pianist at that school. After successfully auditioning for Charles Dennée, Steber was admitted as a piano major at the NECM in 1933. Her parents paid her tuition for her first year of study, and she paid for her remaining education through of a combination of scholarships and money she earned working as an accompanist.

In her first year at the NECM, Steber was a piano student of Dennée and also studied voice with William L. Whitney. With Whitney's support she switched to being a voice major. Whitney was the head of NECM's voice department and had studied singing with Luigi Vannuccini in Florence. Steber credited Whitney with grounding her in a solid bel canto technique. In 1936 she performed in the world premiere of Keith Crosby Brown's operetta Who Discovered America? which was performed by students of the NECM in a national radio broadcast. She graduated from the NECM in 1938.

Steber married fellow singer and NECM student Edwin Lee Bilby in September 1938. The marriage ended in divorce in 1954. They did not have children.

== Early career ==
Steber began her performance career while a student at the NECM as a soprano with the Barnstormers, a Boston group that performed concerts at high schools in Boston in the surrounding region. She also worked as a church musician at Tremont Temple (TT) and Union Congregational Church in Boston, and Eliott Church of Newton, Massachusetts. In January 1936 she was the soprano soloist in Felix Mendelssohn's Lobgesang at Jordan Hall under conductor Ernst Hoffmann in a concert sponsored by the Works Project Administration (WPA). She made her professional opera debut the following September under Hoffmann's baton at the Boston Opera House as Senta in Richard Wagner's The Flying Dutchman in a production mounted by the WPA.

In her early career Steber worked as a radio singer on a variety of programs out of Boston; one of them being the I. J. Fox Fur Trappers Radio Show. In March 1937 she performed in another WPA concert at Sanders Theatre at Harvard University as the soprano soloist in Felix Mendelssohn's Elijah with conductor A. Buckingham Simson. She returned to that theatre the following December as a soloist in another oratorio by Mendelssohn, St. Paul. That same month she was the soprano soloist in Handel's Messiah at the TT under conductor George Sawyer Dunham. In 1938 she performed with the Boston Pops at Symphony Hall singing the aria "Pace, pace, mio Dio!" from Verdi's La forza del destino.

In May 1939 Steber won second prize in the national music competition given by the National Federation of Music Clubs with first prize going to Martha Lipton. Shortly after this competition win she moved to New York City to pursue further training after being advised to do so by her teacher, William L. Whitney. She studied with tenor Paul Althouse in New York. In November 1939 she won the first round of the Metropolitan Opera Auditions of the Air (MOAA) contest by which time she was working as a resident soprano at the Church of St. Paul and St. Andrew (CSPSA). She worked as a singer at CSPSA on an intermittent basis for the remainder of her career. In March 1940 she won the finals of the MOAA competition which earned her a contract with the Metropolitan Opera ("the Met"). The press from this win led to her giving a 1940 concert tour of the United States; the first of many such tours she gave during her career.

== Metropolitan Opera ==
Steber made her debut at the Metropolitan Opera House on December 7, 1940 as Sophie in Der Rosenkavalier. The Met became her artistic home, and she sang their annually for 22 years; performing 33 different characters in more than 400 performances. In her first season with the company she performed the roles of the Forest Bird in Siegfried, Woglinde in both Götterdämmerung and Das Rheingold, a Flower Maiden in Parsifal, and Micaela in Carmen.

At the Met Steber became celebrated for her lyrical interpretations of characters in operas by Mozart; portraying such parts as Countess Almaviva in The Marriage of Figaro, Fiordiligi in Così fan tutte, Pamina in The Magic Flute, and Donna Elvira in Don Giovanni. In 1946 she performed the role of Constanze in the Met's first staging of Mozart's Die Entführung aus dem Serail. She was also much admired at the Met for her performances in the operas of Richard Strauss. In 1955 she sang the title role in the United States premiere of Strauss's Arabella at the Met. Her other important Strauss character was the Marschallin in Der Rosenkavalier which she added to her repertoire as her voice grew in size.

In 1952 Steber's first performance of Desdemona in Verdi's Otello was recorded live for broadcast on the Metropolitan Opera radio broadcasts. In 1958 she portrayed the title role in the world premiere of Samuel Barber's Vanessa at the Met. In 1959 she portrayed Marie in the Met's first staging of Alban Berg's Wozzeck. She remained a regular performer at the Met through 1962; making her last appearance as a regular member of the company on Christmas Day of that year as Donna Anna in Don Giovanni with George London in the title role. She reportedly had conflicts with conductor Lorin Maazel during this last production.

Other parts Steber performed at the Met included Alice Ford in Verdi's Falstaff, Elizabeth in Don Carlo, Elsa in Lohengrin, Eva in Die Meistersinger von Nürnberg, Mimì in La Bohème, Rosalinde in Die Fledermaus, Violetta in La traviata, and the title roles in Manon, Manon Lescaut, and Tosca. In 1962 Metropolitan Opera directpr Rudolf Bing informed Steber that he was not renewing her contract. While Steber stated the decision caught her completely by surprise, she had begun having conflicts with Bing earlier in the 1950s and her performance schedule at the Met had been decreasing in number in the years leading up to her dismissal.

Steber later returned to the Met as a guest for one last role in 1966; replacing an ailing Dorothy Kirsten as Minnie in Puccini's La fanciulla del West. She had not sung the role in more than a decade and had only two days to refresh herself on the part. Later in the year she gave her final performance at the Met on April 16, 1966 as a singer at the company's gala concert.

== Other performances and second marriage ==
Eleanor Steber in La fanciulla del West, Florence, 1954.

In 1941 Steber portrayed Marguerite in Faust at the Gran Teatro de La Habana, and was a soloist in Mozart's Requiem with the New York Philharmonic. In September 1945 she made her debut at the San Francisco Opera as Micaëla in Bizet's Carmen with Risë Stevens in the title role. She subsequently appeared with SFO that same year as Sophie in Der Rosenkavalier and Donna Elvira in Don Giovanni.

In 1947 Steber portrayed Countess Almaviva in The Marriage of Figaro at the Glyndebourne Festival; and that same year toured with the Glyndebourne company for further performances in that opera at the very first Edinburgh Festival (EF). She subsequently performed at the EF in 1948 and 1953. In 1953 she sang the role of Elsa in Lohengrin at the Bayreuth Festival; a performance which was also recorded for Decca Records. It was notably the first time an American had sung the role of Elsa at Bayreuth since Lillian Nordica performed the part in 1894.

In 1948 Steber performed the world premiere of Samuel Barber's Knoxville: Summer of 1915 with the Boston Symphony Orchestra led by Serge Koussevitzky; a work which she commissioned. She frequently performed the work in concerts after this and also recorded it. In 1954 she performed the role of Minnie in La fanciulla del West at the Maggio Musicale Fiorentino with conductor Dimitri Mitropoulos. She returned there the following year in the title role of Strauss's Arabella. She was a charter member of the Lyric Opera of Chicago (LOC); portraying the title role in Puccini's Tosca in the LOC's first season in November 1954. Other roles she performed with LOC included Maddalena di Coigny in Andrea Chénier (1956, with Mario Del Monaco in the title role), Donna Anna (1956), Minnie (1956), Countess Almaviva (1957), and Violetta in La traviata (1958, with Léopold Simoneau as Alfredo).

In 1956 Steber gave a concert tour of the Middle East and Asia sponsored by the United States Department of State that included performances in 33 cities across more than 50,000 miles of travel. While performing in Saigon, Vietnam on this tour she met American military officer Gordon Andrews; a man she later married in 1957. Andrews had three children from a previous relationship who became Eleanor's step-children. Her step-daughter Marsha Andrews became an opera singer at the Met. Together Steber and Andrews co-founded the ST/AND Records in 1959; a record label which released recordings by Steber as well as recordings by other singers and instrumentalist. The label was dissolved after declaring bankruptcy in 1962. Steber and Andrews divorced in 1966.

In 1958 Steber gave a Mozart concert at the Salzburg Festival (SF), and also reprised the title role in Barber's Vanessa at the SF that same year. In 1964 she performed three recitals at Wigmore Hall in London. In the 1970s Steber gave several duo recitals with Blanche Thebom.

In 1973 she portrayed Miss Wingrave in the United States premiere of Benjamin Britten's Owen Wingrave at the Santa Fe Opera. That same year she performed three recitals at Alice Tully Hall (ATH). These concerts were supposed to be Steber's "comeback", but to the singer's disappointment they did not elicit the media coverage that she hoped for. In the autumn of 1973 she gave performed at the Continental Baths, a bathhouse for gay men, in an event now known as the Black Towel Concert due to her performing with black towels draped over her peach gown. This event was recorded live for RCA Red Seal. It drew wide press coverage in a way that her earlier concerts at ATH had not.

In 1978 she gave a recital at Carnegie Hall.

== Teaching career and later life ==
Steber was the head of the voice department at the Cleveland Institute of Music (CIM) from 1963 to 1972. In 1970 she performed and recorded Strauss's Four Last Songs with James Levine conducting the student orchestra of the CIM. It was released on CD by VAI Audio. In 1971 she joined the faculty of the Juilliard School. Some of her students at Juilliard during the 1970s include sopranos Ellen Chickering and Geraldine McMillian. She also gave masterclasses at her alma mater, the New England Conservatory of Music, in the 1970s. In 1973 she founded the Eleanor Steber Music Foundation; a non-profit which aided young singers.

During the 1980s Steber taught on voice faculty at Brooklyn College. In her later life she lived in Port Jefferson, New York; living at her Melodie Hill estate on Long Island. She taught a private voice studio out of her home. In 1990, the year of her death, she was a visiting teaching artist at the University of South Florida. Shortly before her death she wrote an autobiography with Marcia Sloat, Eleanor Steber: An Autobiography, which was posthumously published in 1992. Her papers are held in the Theatre Collection at the Houghton Library at Harvard University.

== Death ==
Steber died of congestive heart failure at Attleboro Nursing Home in Langhorne, Pennsylvania on October 3, 1990 at the age of 76. Her death occurred shortly after having heart valve surgery following a health emergency while visiting her sister in Pennsylvania. She is interred at Greenwood Cemetery, Wheeling, West Virginia.

== Recordings and media appearances ==
Steber began her recording career anonymously; performing uncredited as the leading soprano in a series of LP records of "opera highlights" made in the early 1940s. In 1944 she performed the role of Leonore in Beethoven's Fidelio for a radio broadcast on NBC Radio with the NBC Symphony Orchestra led by Arturo Toscanini. It was later released as an LP by the RCA Victor in 1954. Some of her other complete opera recordings include Mozart's The Marriage of Figaro (1943, Metropolitan Opera), Lohengrin (1953), La fanciulla del West (1954), and Barber’s Vanessa (1958). She also made numerous recordings of popular songs for RCA and Columbia. One the recordings she released on ST/AND Records included Eleanor Steber at Carnegie Hall which was named the best vocal recording of 1958 by the New York Herald Tribune.

Steber was a recurring guest on both the radio and television versions of The Voice of Firestone; performing on the program from as early as 1946 until as late as 1956. In April 1957 she was a guest alongside Mickey Rooney on The Steve Allen Show. Other programs she was a guest performer on included The Bell Telephone Hour and The Railroad Hour among others.

Her extensive recording output of more than 100 albums includes many popular ballads and operetta tunes in addition to arias, art songs and complete operas.

=== Selected discography ===
- Eleanor Steber sings Richard Strauss; VAI Audio; Karl Böhm (1st work), James Levine (2nd work, encore), conductors. Recorded: Munich, June 4, 1953, (1st work); Cleveland, May 5, 1970 (2nd work, encore)
- Eleanor Steber sings Mozart – Selections Voice of Firestone; VAI Audio; Robert Lawrence (1st–6th works), Wilfred Pelletier (7th) or Howard Barlow (8th–10th), conductor. Recorded Apr., 1960 (1st–6th works); from Voice of Firestone radio broadcasts, 1946–1952 (remainder).
- Eleanor Steber, her first recordings (1940); VAI Audio; Wilfrid Pelletier, conductor; Recorded May 30–31, 1940 and June 25–26, 1940, Town Hall, New York City; and June 17, 1940, Academy of Music, Philadelphia.
- The Eleanor Steber Collection. Vol. 1, The Early Career, 1938–1951; Armand Tokatyan (3rd and 5th works); George Cehanovsky (6th work); Leonard Warren (6th work); Recorded 1938–1951.
- Puccini – Madama Butterfly; Sony Classical/ Columbia; Jean Madeira, Suzuki; Metropolitan Opera Orchestra and Chorus; "1949 Metropolitan Opera Association Production".
- Samuel Barber – Knoxville: Summer of 1915 (Columbia Masterworks). Dumbarton Oaks Chamber Orchestra, William Strickland, conductor. Recorded November 7, 1950.
- Wagner – Lohengrin; Teldec; Bayreuth Festival; Josef Keilberth, conductor. Live 1953.
- Hector Berlioz: Les Troyens (Chester Watson (bass), Regina Resnik (soprano), Martial Singher (baritone), Frances Wyatt (mezzo-soprano), William Lewis (tenor), John Dennison (baritone), Kenneth Smith (bass), Regina Sarfaty (mezzo-soprano), Glade Peterson (tenor), Eleanor Steber (soprano), Richard Cassilly (tenor); conductor: Robert Lawrence.) Recorded at Carnegie Hall, New York City, December 29, 1959 and January 12, 1960. Label: Vai Audio
- Puccini – La Fanciulla del West 1954 June 15 live performance at the Florence Maggio Musicale, Dimitri Mitropoulos conductor, with Mario Del Monaco and Gian Giacomo Guelfi (2008 CD release on Regis Records RRC2080)
- Samuel Barber – Vanessa; RCA Victor; Metropolitan Opera Orchestra and Chorus; Dmitri Mitropoulos, conductor; Recorded February and April 1958 in Manhattan Center.
- Eleanor Steber Live at the Continental Baths; RCA Victor; Recorded October 4, 1973.
