= Arbit Blatas =

Lithuanian–Jewish artist and sculptor (1908–1999)

Arbit Blatas (November 19, 1908 – April 27, 1999), born Nicolai Arbitblatas, was an artist and sculptor of Lithuanian–Jewish descent.

== Early life and career as an artist ==
Born in Kaunas on 19 November 1908, Arbit Blatas was a precocious talent who began exhibiting in his native country at the age of 15. He fled the communist revolution to Germany in 1921, where he studied in Berlin, Munich, and Dresden. He left for Paris and, at the age of 21, became the youngest member of the School of Paris. When Blatas was 24, the Galerie Nationale du Jeu de Paume in Paris first acquired some of his paintings; he had already become a colleague and friend of many of the great figures of the Paris art world, such as Vlaminck, Soutine, Picasso, Utrillo, Braque, Zadkine, Léger, and Derain. He was to paint and sculpt them all, as well as Bonnard, Vuillard, Matisse, Dufy, van Dongen, Cocteau, Marquet, and many others. His 30 portraits in oil and bronzes are considered a unique document of the painters and sculptors of that dynamic period in 20th-century French painting. In the 1930s, Blatas exhibited in London and New York, as well as in his adoptive home of Paris. His first Paris exhibition was held at Galerie Van Leer in 1933. In 1935, Blatas exhibited at the Pierre Matisse Gallery in New York, followed by an exhibition at Galerie de l'Elysée (Paris) in 1936. It was at this exhibition that two of his works were chosen for the Museum of Grenoble and of Jeu de Paume.

He married the artist Sylvia Satenstein (1913–1995) in Paris in 1933. Fleeing Nazi-occupied Europe in 1941 for the United States, Blatas became an American citizen. After the war, Blatas divided his life between New York and France; in 1947, he was elected a life member of the Salon d'Automne, in the latter country. His life-size bronze of his colleague and friend Chaïm Soutine, created in 1967, was highly admired by André Malraux. In 1987, the City of Paris installed the statue in Montparnasse and conferred on Blatas the Médaille de Vermeil. A life-size statue of another close friend and colleague, Jacques Lipchitz, now stands in the garden of the Hotel de Ville. In 1978, Arbit Blatas was named Chevalier de la Légion d'Honneur by the French Government for his contribution to French art as an outstanding member of the School of Paris, and in 1994 was promoted to the rank of Officier de la Légion d'Honneur.

== The Holocaust ==
In the late 1970s, the Holocaust – a theme that had hitherto lain dormant for the artist – burst forth in Blatas' work and remained a major theme for the rest of his life. His personal connection to the Holocaust was profound—his parents were deported from Lithuania in 1941 and his mother died in the Stutthof concentration camp while his father managed to survive the Dachau concentration camp. After the war, Blatas returned to France to bring his father back with him to the United States.

Blatas memorialized the Holocaust in many major works. His drawings appeared in the 1978 American television series Holocaust and formed the basis for four public memorials, consisting of seven powerful bas-reliefs, known as The Monument of the Holocaust, on permanent display in four countries: Italy, France, the United States, and Lithuania. In Italy, in the ghetto di Venezia in Venice are located two big bas-reliefs: one in memory of the Shoah in general, and the second one dedicated to the Venetian Jews who were deported between 1943 and 1944. 246 names written on a wooden wall behind a bas relief with a train. Both monument were made in the 1990s.

The first edition of this monument was installed in the historic Venetian Ghetto on April 25, 1980, on the occasion of Liberazione, the national holiday celebrating liberation from Benito Mussolini's government. On that occasion, then-Mayor Mario Rigo decorated Blatas with the Venezia Riconoscente. On September 19, 1993, in the same Ghetto, then-President of Italy Oscar Scalfaro honoured Blatas by dedicating his sculpture The Last Train, a monument honouring the 50th anniversary of the deportation of the Jews from the Venetian Ghetto. The distinguished Italian art historian Enzo di Martini wrote of Blatas' Monument of the Holocaust: "In complete contrast to his paintings, these bronzes are hammered and chiselled in anger and tragedy."

The second edition of The Monument of the Holocaust was dedicated at the Mémorial du Martyr Juif Inconnu in Paris on April 23, 1981. The third edition was placed at One Dag Hammarskjold Plaza on April 25, 1982, by the Anti-Defamation League, across from the United Nations in New York. In 2009, this edition was installed permanently at the Hebrew Union College-Jewish Institute of Religion in New York City. In 2003, the fourth and final edition of this series of sculptures was donated posthumously by his widow as part of the consecration of the memorial at the Ninth Fort in Blatas' native Kaunas, Lithuania, the location from which Blatas' parents were deported in 1941.

== Marcel Marceau and The Threepenny Opera ==
Two other major subjects became leitmotifs in Blatas' work: his great friend Marcel Marceau and "The Threepenny Opera". Both inspired the artist in paintings, sculpture, and lithography. Marceau's portraits range from large portraits to small-scale studies, to sculptures, to sets of lithographs that capture the mime in mid-air. Blatas attended the world première of "The Threepenny Opera" in Berlin in 1928; the musical theatre work by Kurt Weill and Berthold Brecht inspired Blatas for the next 70 years. His canon of work depicting scenes and characters from "The Threepenny Opera" includes 18 portraits, 10 sculptures, several large canvases and sets of color and black-and-white lithographs. The preface by Lotte Lenya, Weill's widow, (published in 'The Art of an Opera' (NYC) June 1962) to the first edition of Threepenny lithographs, pays tribute to Blatas' understanding of the work:

"My immediate impression of his work was: if there ever would be another production of 'The Threepenny Opera', I would be most interested to see what Arbit Blatas would do with it. I found his prints enormously impressive, the characters drawn with the utmost security, his sense of color almost Grand Guignolish. Polly's poisonous sweetness, Macheath's dipped-in-blood elegance, sinister Mr. and Mrs. Peachum, the whores with their ever-ready-for-sale gaiety, they are all brought to life by an artist who knows the meaning of the work and shows it in his own conceptions. I've seen many productions of "The Threepenny Opera". One designed by Arbit Blatas I would be happy to add to the list of all those I have seen so far."

In 1984, "The Threepenny Opera" exhibition was displayed at Venice's Teatro Goldoni. This collection then moved on to the Museum of the City of New York and the Goethe Institute's Toronto branch in 1986. In May 1994, the Grosvenor Gallery in London presented the exhibition called "Arbit Blatas and his World of Music and Theatre." In 2000 and 2001, respectively, the entire "Threepenny Opera" collection appeared as part of the Kurt Weill Centenary celebrations at Belmont University, Nashville, Tennessee, and the Leubsdorf Gallery, Hunter College, New York.

== Career as a designer ==
During the 1970s and 1980s, Blatas designed scenery and costumes for nine international opera productions in collaboration with his wife, the renowned mezzo-soprano, Regina Resnik, as stage director. These productions included "Elektra" (Teatro La Fenice, Venice; Teatro São Carlos, Lisbon; Opéra du Rhin, Strasbourg); "Carmen" (Hamburg State Opera); "Salome" (Teatro São Carlos); "Falstaff" (Teatr Wielki, Warsaw; Teatro la Fenice; Teatro São Carlos; Festival of Madrid); "The Queen of Spades" (Vancouver Opera; Sydney Opera House); and "The Bear" and "The Medium" (Teatro São Carlos).

The 1980s and 1990s saw major exhibitions of Blatas' work, including several devoted to the School of Paris. In Venice, in 1982, the School of Paris portraits became a major exhibition at the Church of San Samuele under the joint auspices of the then-Mayor of Paris, Jacques Chirac, and the then-Mayor of Venice, Mario Rigo. Musée Bourdelle offered the first major exhibition in Paris of the portrait collection in 1986. In 1990, the entire collection of the School of Paris, was shown at the Musée des Années Trente in Boulogne-Billancourt, which subsequently acquired the entire collection now permanently installed in galleries dedicated to Blatas. In 1996, the Eastlake Gallery of New York presented Blatas in an exhibition entitled "Aspects of Venice." In 1997, the Beacon Hill Gallery, also in New York, presented a retrospective show – the last major exhibition of the artist's work in his lifetime. Active into his 90th year, the artist died on April 27, 1999, at his home in New York City. From September 2008 through July 2009, the 100th anniversary of the birth of Arbit Blatas was celebrated in "Arbit Blatas: A Centenary Exhibition" at the Hebrew Union College-Jewish Institute of Religion in New York. This exhibition brought together all the major themes and media of Blatas' body of work for the first time: French and Venetian landscapes, music and theatre subjects in painting, sculptures and lithographs, the School of Paris in sculpture, and scenic designs. The Holocaust was honoured in the fourth edition of Monument of the Holocaust and four towering, major paintings.

Blatas' vivid colours and joie de vivre extends through his entire canon of paintings: landscapes, portraits and still lifes. The French art critic, Jean Bouret, summed the artist up this way: "He is color, his palette is color, exuberant and sensual, as is the man." Throughout his life, Arbit Blatas received many awards and honours. Among them:

== Awards and honors ==
- 1947 - Elected life member of the Salon d'Automne (France)
- 1978 - Chevalier de la Légion d'honneur (France)
- 1980 – Gold Medal "Venezia Riconoscente" – presented by Mayor Mario Rigo
- 1982 - Medal of Masada (Israel)
- 1982 - Special Honor of the City of New York
- 1987 - Commandeur – Médaille de Vermeil (City of Paris)
- 1993 - Gold Medal of Honor, City of Venice ( Italy ) - presented by the President of Italy
- 1993 - Presidential Medal of Italy
- 1994 - Officier de la Légion d'honneur (France)
- 2008 - Commander Cross of the Order of Merit of Lithuania (Posthumous)

== Selected works ==
=== Lithographs ===
- Homage a l'Ecole de Paris: Editions Marcel Sautier, Paris & Graphophile, New York; Preface by Emily Genauer (lithographs of the painters of the School of Paris)
- Marcel Marceau: Preface by Marcel Marceau; Editions Marcel Sautier, Paris; (eleven black and white lithographs)
- L'Opera des Gueux: Editions Marcel Sautier, Paris; prefaces by Jean Bouret and Lotte Lenya; (lithographs in color)
- Resnik: Editeur Archée, Auver-sur-Oise; Introduction by Winthrop Sargeant; Preface by Jean Bouret; (ten black and white lithographs)
- The World's Most Beloved Operas: Editions Jean Lavigne, Paris; (six lithographs in color)
