= Matteo Vittucci =

American dancer and choreographer

- Born: Matteo Marcellus Vittucci; February 5, 1919; Utica, New York
- Died: March 24, 2011 (aged 92); Englewood, New Jersey

Matteo Vittucci, also known as Matthew Vittuci, (February 5, 1919 – March 24, 2011) was an American dancer, choreographer, teacher, and scholar.

== Early life and career ==
Matteo Marcellus Vittucci was born in Utica, New York on February 5, 1919. His parents were Italian. He became interested in dance at a playground centre in New York, and began taking dance lessons when he was seven years old. He trained as a ballet dancer at the Metropolitan Opera Ballet School prior to his university education.

Vittucci started working as a dance teacher in 1938. He attended Cornell University where he taught dance while a student in the early 1940s. After graduating from Cornell University with a B.S. in Sociology in 1943, he joined the United States Air Force and was initially stationed at Woodward Air Force Base in Oklahoma where he was director of the Service Club and choreographed shows to entertain the servicemen. By December 1944 he was working in the Special Services division of the air force at the Fort Sumner Army Air Field.

== Metropolitan Opera ==
Vittucci worked as a ballet dancer with the Metropolitan Opera ("the Met") where he was also an assistant dancing instructor beginning in 1947. He was billed in performances at the Met as Matthew Vittuci; making his debut with the company in A Midsummer Night's Dream on December 26, 1947. In 1949 he portrayed Dr. Thorp in Met's production of Benjamin Britten's Peter Grimes. Matteo was gay, and while working at the Met was in a relationship with tenor John Garris. When Garris was murdered in Atlanta in 1949 while touring with the Met, Matteo was interrogated by the police for an extensive period time even though he was in California at the time that Garris was killed. He continued to perform as a dancer at the Met through 1950.

== Later career ==
Vittucci pursued further studies with La Meri at the Ethnologic Dance Center (EDC) where he earned an Artist's Diploma. While a student at the EDC he performed in a show choreographed by La Meri to the music of Lakme in February 1949. He later received an M.A. in Dance Education from Springfield College (SC). While a graduate student at SC he presented two convocations in 1959.

In 1953, Matteo made his first appearance as an ethnic dance soloist - ethnic-dance, rather than ballet, became his area of expertise. Matteo studied with ethnic-dance experts such as La Meri and went on to study, present, and teach numerous traditional dance forms from nations such as Japan, India, and Spain. He is the author of "The Language of Spanish Dance: A Dictionary and Reference Manual" as well as "Woods that Dance," a study of the use of castanets.

In 1954, Matteo formed a professional partnership with American dancer Carola Goya, whom he married twenty years later. Together, Matteo and Goya founded the Indo-American Dance Company (the company also performed under the names Foundation for Ethnic Dance and the Matteo Ethno-American Dance Theater). By keeping flamenco alive in the United States in the mid-late 20th century, Matteo and Goya successfully cultivated a cultural link between Spain and America.
