= Louis Mennini =

Louis Alfred Mennini (November 18, 1920, Erie, Pennsylvania – February 22, 2000) was an American composer, music educator, and university administrator.

== Life and career ==
Born in Erie, Pennsylvania on November 18, 1920, Mennini was the son of Amalia (née Benacci) and Attilio Mennini. His younger brother was the composer Peter Mennin. Both parents were passionate about music and supported the music education and development of their children. Louis began studies in piano and music theory at a young age, and produced his first music compositions at the age of nine. He graduated from Strong Vincent High School in Erie, Pennsylvania in 1939.

Mennini began his professional studies in music at the Oberlin Conservatory of Music where he studied music composition with Normand Lockwood from 1939 through 1942. His education was interrupted by military service during World War II, and he served as a sergeant in the United States Air Force in England from 1942 through 1945. After the war, he studied music composition with Bernard Rogers and Howard Hanson at the Eastman School of Music at the University of Rochester. He earned three degrees from that institution; a Bachelor of Music in 1947, a Master of Music in 1948 and a Doctor of Musical Arts in 1961.

Mennini began his career as a music educator at the University of Texas at Austin as assistant professor of music composition and orchestration where he taught from a single academic year in 1948–49. He then returned to Eastman where he was a professor of music composition from 1949 through 1965. He then served as the Dean of University of North Carolina School of the Arts from 1965 through 1971. He left that post to spend two years studying in Florence, Italy. He returned to United States when he was appoint the Chair of the music department at Mercyhurst University in 1973; a position he held for the next ten years. He left Mercyhurst in 1983 to establish the Virginia School of the Arts in Lynchburg, Virginia; serving as the head of that institution until his retirement in 1988.

Mennini died on February 22, 2000.
