= Geraldine McMillian =

American soprano

Geraldine McMillian (born April 15, 1953) is an American soprano particularly known for her performances in operas by Giacomo Puccini and Wolfgang Amadeus Mozart. A native of New Haven, Connecticut, she was educated at the Neighborhood Music School in New Haven and the Juilliard School in New York City. She began her professional career as a concert soprano in 1979. She made her opera debut in 1980 with the Opera Ensemble of New York as Countess Almaviva in The Marriage of Figaro. She has had a career with mainly regional American orchestras and opera companies. On the national stage, she toured in the Houston Grand Opera's 1987 revival of Porgy and Bess. She has starred in that opera with many American companies in a variety of parts; including Bess, Annie, and Clara.

In the early 1990s McMillian toured the United States in several operas staged by the New York City Opera; portraying the roles of Mimì in La bohème (1990), Countess Almaviva (1991), and the title roles in Tosca (1992), and Madama Butterfly (1994). Other roles in her repertoire include Liu in Turandot, both Donna Anna and Donna Elvira in Don Giovanni, Pamina in The Magic Flute, and the title roles in Verdi's Aida and Puccini's Suor Angelica among others. Companies she has sung leading roles with include the Baltimore Opera Company, Boston Lyric Opera, Central City Opera, Connecticut Opera, Minnesota Opera, Nashville Opera, San Francisco Opera, and Tulsa Opera among others. After 2010 her performance career shifted away from opera towards work as a recitalist. In the 2020s she has performed as a member of The Concert Chorale of Harlem; including performing both with the choir and as a soloist with Eclat Opera and the Philharmonic Orchestra of Jamaica in 2024.

== Early life and education ==
The daughter of Novella McMillian, Geraldine McMillian was born on April 15, 1953. Her father died when she was young, and she was raised by her mother who worked as a domestic in New Haven, Connecticut. She graduated from Wilbur Cross High School, and then attended community college in New Haven. While studying at this school her interests were directed towards a career in opera after she saw a performance of Il trovatore starring Leontyne Price. She subsequently studied voice at the Neighborhood Music School in New Haven.

McMillian auditioned for the Juilliard School (JS) and was accepted on a scholarship. At JS, she studied voice with Eleanor Steber from 1974 to 1979. She starred as Arminda in Juilliard's 1979 production of Mozart's La finta giardiniera with a cast led by Hei-Kyung Hong in the title role. She graduated with a bachelor's degree in vocal performance from JS in 1979. After this she joined the young artist program at Pennsylvania Opera Festival (POF) in Pittsburgh; an organization for developing pre-professional young opera singers getting ready for the professional stage. At the 1979 POF she performed in Mario Castelnuovo-Tedesco's rarely staged chamber opera, The Importance of Being Earnest, under Metropolitan Opera conductor Richard Woitach.

== Early career ==
McMillian made her debut as a concert soprano in 1979 performing Samuel Barber's Knoxville: Summer of 1915 with the Ridgewood Chamber Orchestra (now Ridgewood Symphony Orchestra) under conductor Walter Engel. She made her professional opera debut in 1980 with the Opera Ensemble of New York as Countess Almaviva in The Marriage of Figaro. She spent the next several years working as a concert singer with regional orchestras; making appearances with the Erie Philharmonic, the Hartford Symphony Orchestra, the New Haven Symphony Orchestra, the Columbus Symphony Orchestra, and the Virginia Symphony Orchestra. To support herself during her early career, she worked office jobs to supplement her income.

In 1985 McMillian gave a concert at the Brooklyn Museum with actor and tenor Damon Evans. In 1986 she was the soprano soloist in Beethoven's Symphony No. 9 with the Queens Philharmonic Orchestra conducted by JoAnn Falletta. That same year she portrayed the role of Annie in George Gershwin's Porgy and Bess at the Tulsa Opera; a production which was organized by Simon Estes. She subsequently repeated this role at the Houston Grand Opera (HGO) in 1987. She toured in the HGO production that same year for performances with the Cleveland Opera, the San Diego Opera, and the San Francisco Opera. In 1988 she portrayed both Clara and Bess (alternating in the parts) in that same opera for her debut with the Baltimore Opera Company She also portrayed Bess at the Florentine Opera in 1989. In 1989 she sang a program of works by Richard Strauss with the Chicago Symphony Orchestra.

== Opera career in the 1990s and 2000s ==
In 1990 McMillian toured the United States for ten weeks as Mimì in the New York City Opera (NYCO) production of Giacomo Puccini's La bohème. Later that year she performed the role of Bess with the NYCO and was heard as Liu in Puccini's Turandot with the Florida Grand Opera. In 1991 she toured to 56 North American cities with the NYCO, performing Countess Almaviva in Wolfgang Amadeus Mozart's The Marriage of Figaro. Music critic John Rockwell of The New York Times stated in his review that "[McMillian's] soprano, big and shining like a cross between Eleanor Steber and Martina Arroyo, commands attention.

In January 1992 McMillian embarked on a second NYCO national tour in the title role in Puccini's Tosca. In 1993 she portrayed both Donna Anna in Mozart's Don Giovanni and Cio-Cio-San in Puccini's Madama Butterfly at the Minnesota Opera (MO). She repeated the latter role in 1994 with the NYCO at Lincoln Center and on national tour. In 1995 she returned to the MO as Liu with Suzanne Murphy as Turandot. She performed Cio-Cio-San with the El Paso Opera in 1996, and appeared as Tosca at the Pacific Opera Victoria (POV) in 1997. She subsequently portrayed Tosca at the MO in 1998, and returned to the POV in 1999 as Donna Anna.

In October 1997 McMillian performed the title role in Giuseppe Verdi's Aida with the Nashville Opera; her first appearance in a staged production of the opera. She subsequently portrayed Aida at the MO (1998), the Boston Lyric Opera (1999), Opera Omaha (1999), and Opera Memphis (2000). In August 1998 she portrayed Mary in William Grant Still's Highway 1, USA and the title role in Puccini's Suor Angelica with the Houston Ebony Opera Guild (HEOG) at the Miller Outdoor Theatre. She has sung with HEOG in multiple other productions; including the roles of Pamina in The Magic Flute (2002), Donna Elvira in Don Giovanni (2004) and Cio-Cio-San (2007).

McMillian was a featured performer in the 2000 PBS documentary film Aida's Brothers and Sisters which focused on black opera singers. In 2000 she sang the Monisha in Scott Joplin's Treemonisha at the Opera Theatre of Saint Louis, Madame Lidoine in Francis Poulenc's Dialogues of the Carmelites at the Central City Opera, Donna Anna at the Connecticut Opera, and Donna Elvira at the Nashville Opera. She returned to the Connecticut Opera to sing Liu in Turandot in 2002. In 2003 she portrayed Donna Anna to Christopher Schaldenbrand's Don Giovanni at the Tulsa Opera. In 2004 she gave a recitals with pianist Richard Mercier at Max Noah Recital Hall at Georgia College & State University, and pianist Neely Bruce at Wesleyan University in Connecticut.

In 2008 McMillian returned to the Connecticut Opera as Donna Elvira in Don Giovanni with baritone Michael Mayes in the title role. In 2009 she was the soprano soloist in Handel's Messiah with the Oratorio Society of Queens. She also was a voice instructor and performer in the summers of 2008 & 2009 at the Festival of Song & Academy held at Waldorf College and the University of Nebraska. In 2010 she sang arias and duets from Porgy and Bess; singing excerpts written for the characters of Bess, Serena, and Clara with the El Paso Opera and baritone Roland Burks (as Porgy).

== Later career ==
From 2011 to 2013 she gave annual recitals at the University of Minnesota Duluth with pianist David Mayfield as part of the university's Ovation Guest Artist Series. In 2014 she performed with tenor Willie Morales at a fundraiser ever for the University of Northern Iowa's public policy program. In 2015 she performed the program "The Almost Forgotten Songs of Ivor Novello and Noël Coward" at the Ossie Davis Theater, New Rochelle Public Library with pianist Eric Jennings. In 2022 she gave a recital, "No Forgotten Voices, at the Kaufman Music Center with pianist Cris Frisco.

McMillan is a member of The Concert Chorale of Harlem. In 2024 she performed with the chorus as part of a concert given with Eclat Opera and the Philharmonic Orchestra of Jamaica in Kingston, Jamaica. She was featured in the program singing "Climb Ev'ry Mountain" from The Sound of Music. She has been a longtime resident of Queens, New York City.
