= General Motors Concerts =

The General Motors Symphony Orchestra can be heard on this and other recordings. Swedish tenor Jussi Björling made his American debut on a General Motors Concert.

General Motors Concerts, offering classical music on the radio, were heard in different formats on the NBC Red and NBC Blue networks between 1929 and 1937. The concerts began 1929-31 as a 30-minute series on the Red Network with Frank Black as the musical conductor on Mondays at 9:30pm. It also aired as General Motors Family Party.

The 1935–37 Red series, expanding to a full hour on Sundays at 10 p.m., featured Ernö Rapée conducting, along with violinists Yehudi Menuhin and Erica Morini, tenor Lauritz Melchior, and sopranos Kirsten Flagstad, Lotte Lehmann and Florence Easton.

With a title change to The General Motors Promenade Concerts, the program moved April 1937 to the Blue Network for a series of hour-long thematic shows with male/female leads, including one show of Victor Herbert music with Jan Peerce and Rose Bampton. Broadcast on Sundays at 8pm, this series continued until June 1937.

As General Motors Concert, the final 13-week series brought together radio's first concert stock company on October 3, 1937. With Rapee conducting the General Motors Symphony Orchestra and Chorus, these broadcasts were part of a Sunday Nights at Carnegie Hall series sponsored by General Motors.

Swedish tenor Jussi Björling made his American debut as part of this series on November 28, 1937. The rotating line-up of leading name performers featured Björling, Donald Dickson, Helen Jepson, Maria Jeritza, Grace Moore, Erna Sack, Joseph Schmidt and Richard Tauber. In addition to the music, John B. Kennedy narrated science stories. The announcer was Milton Cross. The series presented its final broadcast on December 26, 1937.

== See also ==
- The Ford Sunday Evening Hour

== Listen to ==
- Telephone interview with Grace Moore prior to her October 1937 appearance on General Motors Concert
