= Vanessa (opera) =

Opera by Samuel Barber

- Opera by Samuel Barber
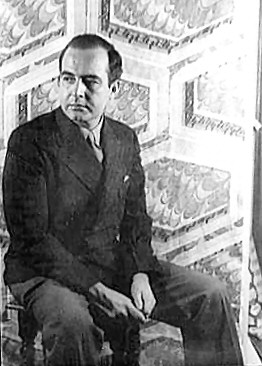
- The composer in 1944
- Librettist: Gian Carlo Menotti
- Language: English
- Premiere: January 15, 1958; Metropolitan Opera, New York

Vanessa is an American opera in three (originally four) acts by Samuel Barber, opus 32, with an original English libretto by Gian Carlo Menotti. It was composed in 1956–1957 and was first performed at the Metropolitan Opera in New York City on January 15, 1958 under the baton of Dimitri Mitropoulos in a production designed by Cecil Beaton and directed by Menotti. Barber revised the opera in 1964, reducing the four acts to the three-act version most commonly performed today.

== Performance history ==
For the Met premiere, Sena Jurinac was contracted to sing the title role. However, she cancelled six weeks before the opening night and Eleanor Steber replaced her, making the role her own for a long time. In the role of Erika, Vanessa's niece, was Rosalind Elias, then a young mezzo-soprano. Nicolai Gedda sang the lover Anatol, mezzo Regina Resnik sang the Baroness, Vanessa's mother, while bass Giorgio Tozzi sang the old doctor. It was the first American opera in 11 years to be seen at the company, and only the 20th in 73 years.

The premiere "was an unqualified success" with the audience———and with many of the critics as well, although they were somewhat qualified in their judgment. Of the final quintet, however, New York Times critic Howard Taubman said it is '...a full-blown set-piece that packs an emotional charge and that would be a credit to any composer anywhere today.'" Other reports substantiate this and it won Barber the Pulitzer Prize. The original production was shown at the Salzburg Festival in the same year, which was the first performance in Europe. In Europe, however, it met with a chillier reception.

The Met's Cecil Beaton sets were destroyed by fire in 1973. After a long period of few revivals, one being in 1988 by the Opera Theatre of Saint Louis, the Washington National Opera (in a co-production with the Dallas Opera) revived the work in 1995 using the 1964 revised and more compact version. Elizabeth Holleque sang the title role.

Kiri Te Kanawa sang the title role in three revivals, the first of which was presented by the Opéra de Monte-Carlo in 2001, the second in 2002 at the Washington National Opera and the third in 2004 (at the time, described as her farewell to the opera stage), at the Los Angeles Opera.

In all three productions, Rosalind Elias, who sang Erika in the 1958 premiere, took on the role of the Baroness. For its 50th anniversary revival by the New York City Opera in November 2007, she was once more featured in that role, with Lauren Flanigan taking the title role.

More recent productions have included those at Glyndebourne in 2018, and by Heartbeat Opera at Williamstown Theatre Festival in 2025 and in New York City in 2026.

Highlights from the score include the soprano scena and aria He has come, he has come!...Do Not Utter a Word (recorded by Leontyne Price, Roberta Alexander, and Renée Fleming), the mezzo aria Must the Winter Come So Soon? (recorded by Denyce Graves and Roberta Alexander), and the last-act quintet, To Leave, to Break.

== Source of the story ==
In many print media it says that the libretto of Gian Carlo Menotti is based on a work of Isak Dinesen (pen name of Karen Blixen), described variously as a "short story" or "novella". However, the story is not found in any of Isak Dinesen's works. There is evidence of Samuel Barber's having read Blixen's Seven Gothic Tales, and the mistaking of the proper source may have come from a proclamation by Menotti and Barber, that the opera reproduced the "atmosphere" of Isak Dinesen's Seven Gothic Tales. "Menotti recalled, 'I was writing a libretto for Sam, and Sam is essentially a romantic personality...'" Menotti was "inspired by Isak Dinesen's stories, in particular her Seven Gothic Tales. He said, 'I felt that the atmosphere... would make a wonderful opera.'"

Blixen was present at the premiere of the opera, but part way through the performance she pleaded illness and left the theater. Her secretary wrote that Barber was "upset" by Blixen's premature departure from the opera. Blixen made no public comment.

== Roles ==
Role	Voice type	Premiere cast, January 15, 1958 (Conductor: Dimitri Mitropoulos)
Vanessa	soprano	Eleanor Steber
Erika, her niece	mezzo-soprano	Rosalind Elias
The Old Baroness, Vanessa's mother	contralto	Regina Resnik
Anatol, the son of Vanessa's original lover, also named Anatol	tenor	Nicolai Gedda
The Old Doctor	baritone	Giorgio Tozzi
Nicholas, the major-domo	bass	George Cehanovsky
The Footman	bass	Robert Nagy

== Synopsis ==
Time: About 1905.
Place: Vanessa's country house in a northern country.

=== Act 1 ===
In her secluded country house, Vanessa awaits the arrival of Anatol, a man who had been Vanessa's lover twenty years before. After he left, she covered up all the mirrors of the house until his expected return, unwilling to face looking at her aging self. She lives alone with her mother, the Baroness, who has refused to speak to her for twenty years, and with her niece, Erika. Thinking that the man who arrives and who is called Anatol is her former lover, Vanessa refuses to reveal her face to him until he says he still loves her. He says that he does, but she does not recognize him. It is the young Anatol who has come, his father now dead. Upset, Vanessa leaves the room, and Erika and Anatol now enjoy the meal and wine meant for Vanessa and his father.

=== Act 2 ===
Erika tells the Baroness that the young Anatol seduced her on his first night in the house and the Baroness scolds her. Erika has fallen in love with Anatol, but resists his marriage proposal because she doubts his sincerity. Not knowing that Erika loves the young man and in her delusionary state of mind, Vanessa tells her niece that she still loves him, despite Erika's warning that he is not her former lover. The Baroness tells Erika to fight for Anatol. She is unsure if he is worthy of her efforts. Again, he proposes, and, again, she declines.

=== Act 3 ===
The doctor is drunk at a New Year's Eve ball. The Baroness and Erika refuse to come to the party to hear his announcement of Anatol and Vanessa's engagement. The doctor goes to fetch them, while Vanessa tells Anatol her fears. Finally Erika, who, unbeknownst to everyone else, is pregnant, comes downstairs, but faints, clutching her stomach, while the doctor is making the announcement. She recovers and flees into the freezing weather in order to cause herself to miscarry. (In the original she says, "His child! It must not be born!" which makes clear her motivation for going out into the cold, but this line is dropped in the revision.)

=== Act 4 ===
Vanessa is happy when Erika is found alive, and she asks Anatol why Erika is acting so strangely and whether he thinks that she loves him. He explains that she does not. Continuing in her delusionary state, Vanessa begs Anatol to take her away. Meanwhile, Erika confesses to the Baroness that she had been pregnant, but is no longer. The Baroness, horrified, refuses to speak to her.

As Vanessa and Anatol finalize their preparations to move to Paris, Vanessa asks Erika why she ran away. The niece replies that she was just being foolish, and Vanessa says she may never come back to the house where she has been living. After the couple leaves, Erika covers the mirrors and closes up the house, just as Vanessa had done before her. She says that it is now her turn to wait.

== Recordings ==
Year	Cast: Vanessa, Erika, Baroness, Anatol, Doctor	Conductor, Opera house and orchestra	Label
1958	Eleanor Steber, Rosalind Elias, Regina Resnik, Nicolai Gedda, Giorgio Tozzi	Dimitri Mitropoulos, Metropolitan Opera Orchestra and Chorus	Audio CD: RCA Victor; Cat: 7899-2-RG, (cast of world premiere, per booklet with original LP recording)
1958	Eleanor Steber, Rosalind Elias, Ira Malaniuk, Nicolai Gedda, Giorgio Tozzi	Dimitri Mitropoulos, Vienna Philharmonic Orchestra and Chorus	Audio CD: Orfeo; Cat: C653062I (European premiere)
2002	Ellen Chickering, Andrea Matthews, Marion Dry, Ray Bauwens; Richard Conrad	Gil Rose, National Symphony Orchestra of Ukraine and Capella Dumka of Ukraine	Audio CD: Naxos; Cat:8.669140-41
2003	Christine Brewer, Susan Graham, Catherine Wyn-Rogers, William Burden; Neal Davies	Leonard Slatkin, BBC Symphony Orchestra	Super Audio CD: Chandos; Cat:CHSA 5032(2)
June 21, 2019	Emma Bell, Virginie Verrez, Edgaras Montvidas, Rosalind Plowright, Donnie Ray Albert	Director Keith Warner; Conductor Jakub Hrůša; Glyndebourne Opera	Blu-Ray. DVD. Studio: BBC / Opus Arte. Subtitles: French, German, Japanese, Korean.
2026	Nicole Heaston, J'Nai Bridges, Susan Graham, Matthew Polenzani, Thomas Hampson	Gianandrea Noseda; National Symphony Orchestra	National Symphony Orchestra Label
