= The Warrior (opera) =

The Warrior is an opera in one act with music by Bernard Rogers and a libretto by Norman Corwin. It tells the Biblical story of Samson and Delilah using free verse. Corwin's libretto was adapted from his own radio play, Samson, which he had written earlier. The opera contains no arias and relies on recitative to convey its story. It was premiered in New York by the Metropolitan Opera in 1947.

== Plot ==
The plot of the opera is taken from chapter 16 of the Book of Judges. The opera is divided into four scenes. The first scene depicts the seduction of Samson by Delilah and the cutting of Samson's hair which causes him to lose his supernatural strength. The opera culminates in its final scene with Samson destroying the Philistine temple after God has returned his strength. Samson breaks the pillars of the temple which cause the structure to collapse; killing Samson and the Philistines.

== History ==
=== Composition and background ===
The Warrior was originally titled Samson, and it was commissioned by the League of Composers in 1944 with the intent that it would be produced as a radio opera for broadcast by CBS Radio. The inspiration for the opera was a radio play, Samson, which had been written earlier by Norman Corwin and broadcast on the 1941 radio drama series 26 By Corwin. Bernard Rogers had heard the radio play and approached Corwin about turning it into an opera; a proposal to which Corwin agreed. The libretto for the opera was nearly identical to the script used for the radio drama; as the words Corwin wrote for this work were already rhythmic and lyrical in nature. Rogers lifted Corwin's text for the play verbatim into the opera libretto.

The opera was originally scheduled to premiere in a national CBS Radio broadcast on June 6, 1945 with Mack Harrell as Samson and Mona Paulee as Delilah. The CBS Symphony Orchestra, the Columbia Chorale, and conductor Bernard Herrmann were scheduled to perform in this broadcast. However, when the opera went into rehearsals Herrmann did not like the piece, and decided to not have it performed. Corwin also was disappointed in Rogers score which he felt was "disappointedly atonal" and was too modern sounding to suit the atmosphere of the story.

Rogers was heartbroken and embarrassed that his work had been withdrawn from performance, but rebounded by submitting the opera to an opera composition competition with entries entered anonymously. In 1946 it won this contest, the Alice M. Ditson Fund Contest, which was co-sponsored by the Metropolitan Opera ("the Met") and Columbia University. This competition win led to the work's acceptance at the Met which agreed to stage it.

=== Stagings and critical assessment ===
The Warrior was given its world premiere at the Metropolitan Opera House on January 11, 1947 in a production staged by Herbert Graf with set designs by Samuel Leve. The production was conducted by Max Rudolf and starred Mack Harrell as Samson and Regina Resnik as Delilah. Others in the cast included Kenneth Schon as the Officer; Irene Jordan as the Boy; Felix Knight, Anthony Marlowe, John Baker and Osie Hawkins as the Philistine Lords; and John Garris, Thomas Hayward, and William Hargrave as the Captains. Mary Percy Schenck designed the costumes.

Time magazine gave a mostly negative review of the opera, stating "As an atmospheric but not particularly melodious score, The Warrior had its moments; generally, however, it sounded like background music to a movie." Robert A. Simon gave a mixed review in The New Yorker that overall felt the text rather than the music dominated the production with few moments where the music truly shined. He stated that "the opera is essentially a play whose dialogue that has been reinforced with music. The vocal parts are necessarily declamatory, but Mr. Rogers has written them skillfully, and he has also provided an orchestral score that ranges from atmospheric suggestion to a kind of tonal punctuation."

Olin Downes gave a scathing review of the Met's production of The Warrior in The New York Times which Rogers blamed for the opera's later neglect. Downes wrote the following in his review:

"This is a singularly weak and ineffectual opera, so weak and ineffectual, so strikingly without inspiration or dramatic intensity, that one only wonders why a jury of eminent authorities should have given it the Alice M. Ditson prize, and why, even on the basis of such endorsement, the Metropolitan should have produced it. Of the two authors of this work, Mr. Corwin comes off the better. He has some glowing lines, but his tabloid version of the tremendous story of Samson and Delilah, taken as a whole, creates no real characters, projects no genuinely powerful emotional moments indeed hardly gives itself time to do so- and wavers in its style between the stilted and pretentious and the “modern” and colloquial."

It was not staged again until 1962 when it was revived by the Eastman School of Music as part of its 32nd annual festival of American music. It starred Robert Ellinwood as Samson, Lenita Chadima as Delilah, James Stuart as the chief captain and Philistine Lord, and June Ackroyd as the Boy. It was conducted by Charles Fussell and staged by Leonard Treash. The Bernard Rogers collection at the Eastman School of Music's library at the University of Rochester contains a complete libretto and piano score of the opera, and a partial orchestrated score.
