= Caravan (1934 film) =

1934 film by Erik Charell

- Theatrical release poster (1934)
- Directed by: Erik Charell
- Written by: Melchior Lengyel (original story Gypsy Melody); Samson Raphaelson (screen play and dialogue); Robert Liebmann (continuity)
- Produced by: Robert Kane
- Starring: Loretta Young; Charles Boyer; Phillips Holmes; Jean Parker
- Cinematography: Ernest Palmer; Theodor Sparkuhl
- Edited by: Otho Lovering
- Music by: Werner R. Heymann; Peter Brunelli (uncredited); Louis De Francesco (uncredited); Alois Reiser (uncredited)
- Distributed by: Fox Film Corporation
- Release date: September 28, 1934
- Running time: 101 minutes
- Country: United States
- Languages: English; German

Caravan is a 1934 American musical film released by Fox Film Corporation, directed by Erik Charell, and starring Charles Boyer, Loretta Young, Phillips Holmes and Jean Parker. Fox also produced a French language version of this film, Caravane (1934) starring Boyer, Annabella, and Conchita Montenegro, with Lou Tellegen in a small role.

== Plot ==
The young Countess Wilma is forced to wed by midnight or lose her inheritance. Wilma impulsively chooses gypsy vagabond Latzi, offering him a huge sum of money if he'll consent. Swallowing his pride, Latzi agrees to the marriage, but soon Wilma falls in love with the young Lieutenant Von Tokay who is himself in love with Latzi's gypsy sweetheart Timka.

== Cast ==
- Charles Boyer as Latzi
- Loretta Young as Countess Wilma
- Jean Parker as Timka
- Phillips Holmes as Lt. von Tokay
- Louise Fazenda as Miss Opitz
- Eugene Pallette as Gypsy Chief
- C. Aubrey Smith as Baron von Tokay
- Charley Grapewin as Notary
- Noah Beery as Innkeeper
- Dudley Digges as Administrator
- Billy Bevan as Police Sergeant
- Lionel Belmore as Station Master
- Felix Knight as Gypsy Singer (uncredited)
