= Regina Resnik =

American opera singer (1922–2013)

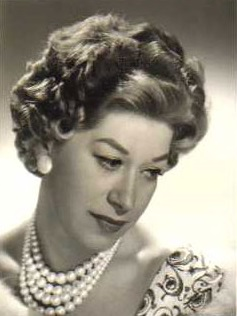
- Resnik in 1968
- Born: August 30, 1922; The Bronx, New York City, US
- Died: August 8, 2013 (aged 90); Manhattan, New York City, US
- Occupation: Opera singer
- Years active: 1942–1991

Regina Resnik (born Regina Resnick, August 30, 1922 – August 8, 2013) was an American opera singer who had an active international career that spanned five decades. She began her career as a soprano in 1942 and soon after began a relationship with the Metropolitan Opera that spanned from 1944 until 1983. Under the advice of conductor Clemens Krauss, she began retraining her voice in the mezzo-soprano repertoire in 1953 and by 1956 had completely removed soprano literature from her performance repertoire.

While the Met was Resnik's artistic home, she worked regularly as a guest artist with other major American opera companies and with the top European opera houses, including La Scala, the Paris Opera, the Royal Opera, London, the San Francisco Opera, and the Vienna State Opera. After the mid-1980s, her performance career transitioned away from opera towards musical theater.

In addition to performing, Resnik worked as a stage director at several European opera houses during the 1970s and 1980s, usually in collaboration with her husband, scenic and costume designer Arbit Blatas. She was also active as a voice teacher, teaching on the voice faculties of several music conservatories, including the Juilliard School.

== Early life and education ==
Regina Resnick was born in The Bronx, New York City, on August 30, 1922, to impoverished Ukrainian Jewish immigrants who had just arrived in New York. Resnik dropped the "c" out of "Resnick" at an early age. At the age of 10 she volunteered to sing a solo in a concert at her local school. At the age of 13 she took her first lessons from Rosalie Miller, and soon afterwards won $10 appearing on Major Bowes Amateur Hour on public radio.

A gifted student academically, Resnick skipped several school grades. She attended Herman Ridder Junior High School and then James Monroe High School in the Bronx where she had her first experience performing on the stage, singing leading roles in school productions of operettas and performing in her school's glee club. Resnik stated that "I owe my awareness of having a voice to the New York School system". After graduating from high school in 1938, she studied singing with Giuseppe Danise at Hunter College, where she earned a B.A. in music in 1942.

== Performance career ==
Resnik made her professional singing debut at the age of 22 on October 27, 1942, giving a recital of art songs at the Brooklyn Academy of Music. Just two months later she made her professional opera debut with Fritz Busch's New Opera Company at the Broadway Theatre in Manhattan as Lady Macbeth in Verdi's Macbeth with Jess Walters in the title role. In February and March 1943 she sang Leonore in Beethoven's Fidelio and Micaela in Bizet's Carmen at the Palacio de Bellas Artes in Mexico City under Erich Kleiber. In the spring of 1944, she portrayed both Frasquita and Micaela in Carmen in the New York City Opera's (NYCO) first season with Dusolina Giannini in the title role. She was also seen at the NYCO that season as Santuzza in Mascagni's Cavalleria rusticana.

In April 1944 Resnik won the Metropolitan Opera Auditions of the Air, performing "Ernani, involami", and was offered a contract with that company for the 1944/45 season. Her debut at the Met was doubly dramatic – on one day's notice she substituted on December 6, 1944, for Zinka Milanov as Leonora in Verdi's Il trovatore eliciting acclaim from the public, the critics noting that all the vocal "virtuosity" and her stage presence as an actress were very impressive. During the next decade, she offered twenty heroines: Donna Elvira and Donna Anna (in Mozart's Don Giovanni), the title role of Fidelio, Sieglinde (in Wagner's Die Walküre) and Gutrune (in Götterdämmerung), Chrysothemis (in Elektra by R. Strauss), Verdi's Rosalinda and Eboli in Don Carlos, Aida, Alice Ford in Falstaff, and Puccini's Tosca, Madama Butterfly and Musetta in La bohème. She was the Met's first Ellen Orford in Britten's Peter Grimes and created Delilah in the world premiere of Bernard Rogers' The Warrior. She then also began a long association with the San Francisco Opera. Her voice was a dramatic soprano which invited comparison with Rosa Ponselle. During these years, her teacher was Rosalie Miller and her life began with the legendary conductors Otto Klemperer, Bruno Walter, George Szell, Fritz Reiner, William Steinberg and Erich Leinsdorf.

In 1953, while singing Sieglinde at the Bayreuth Festival, the conductor Clemens Krauss was to forecast her future, suggesting her voice was actually a mezzo-soprano. Despite her great success as a soprano, she realized that her entire voice was constantly darkening in color. In 1955 she began a year of restudy with Danise. Her first two roles were Amneris in Aida and Laura in La Gioconda. On February 15, 1956, she debuted as a mezzo-soprano at the Met in a brilliant portrayal of Marina in Mussorgsky's Boris Godunov under Dimitri Mitropoulos. October 1957, was the beginning of a long career in London at the Royal Opera House. Her debut as Carmen was a success and, in time, she was heard as Amneris in Aida), Marina, Ulrica in Verdi's Un ballo in maschera, the Nurse in Die Frau ohne Schatten by R. Strauss and the Old Prioress in Poulenc's Dialogues of the Carmelites. In the Zeffirelli–Giulini production of Falstaff, her Mistress Quickly became the model for this role. Carmen, Klytemnestra (Elektra), Mistress Quickly and the Pique Dame (The Queen of Spades) became her signature roles. In 1959 she portrayed Didon in Les Troyens by Berlioz, conducted by Robert Lawrence.

Fluent singing in six languages, Resnik crossed stylistic lines from the classic to the romantic, the Wagnerian to the modern. As the years passed, Resnik developed a steady network of international performances: La Scala, La Fenice, the Paris Opéra (hailed as Carmen), Salzburg, Naples, Vienna, Lisbon, Madrid, Buenos Aires, Munich, Berlin, Brussels, Marseilles, Stuttgart, Hamburg, Chicago, Edinburgh, Santiago and a return to Bayreuth.

The Met, however, remained her base and among her triumphs there was the new Elektra (with Birgit Nilsson and Leonie Rysanek) and Tchaikovsky's The Queen of Spades. Outside the Met, she appeared in works such as Menotti's The Medium, von Einem's The Visit of the Old Lady, Walton's The Bear, Kurt Weill's Rise and Fall of the City of Mahagonny, Britten's The Rape of Lucretia – both Female Chorus and Lucretia) and Barber's Vanessa.

She recorded all her signature roles: Carmen (Thomas Schippers), Klytemnestra (Georg Solti), Mistress Quickly (Leonard Bernstein), Orlovsky (Herbert von Karajan), "Pique Dame" Countess (Mstislav Rostropovich) and Sieglinde (Clemens Krauss), among many others. She became the only singer in operatic history to have sung both the soprano and mezzo leads in much of her repertory. In the United States and Canada she has also appeared in countless regional companies. From 1971 until 1981, she distinguished herself as a stage director with Arbit Blatas, the Lithuanian-born painter and sculptor, as designer. Carmen (Hamburg; which became the film The Dream and the Destiny), Falstaff (Venice, Warsaw, Madrid, Lisbon), The Queen of Spades (Vancouver, Sydney), The Medium and The Bear (Lisbon), Elektra (Venice, Strasbourg, Lisbon) and Salome (Lisbon, Graz).

In 1987, Resnik made a transition to the American musical theatre as a singing actress. Her Fraulein Schneider in Cabaret on Broadway earned her a Tony nomination and her Mme. Armfeldt (A Little Night Music) at Lincoln Center brought her a Drama Desk nomination in 1991.

Resnik died aged 90 from a stroke in Manhattan.

== Teaching career ==
Resnik was a master class teacher at the Metropolitan Opera for ten years, at the Mozarteum (Salzburg), the Canadian Opera Company (Toronto), the San Francisco Opera, the Opera Studio of Opéra Bastille in Paris, the Curtis Institute of Music and the Juilliard School. She was Master Teacher-in-Residence in the Opera Department of the Mannes College of Music, and was responsible for the preparation of La bohème, The Magic Flute, Don Giovanni, Il tabarro, Gianni Schicchi, The Marriage of Figaro and The Dialalogue of the Carmelites. In Italy, she was Master Teacher of Vocal Studies at the Ca' Zenobio Master Campus in Treviso, and musical director of Eurobottega, a unique program for young singers of the European Union, with headquarters in Venice and Treviso. The now renowned concert series "Regina Resnik Presents" has become part of the American musical scene. Its most recent production has been a major three-part portrait of the Jewish musical experience, entitled "Colors of the Diaspora." Conceived by her son, Michael Philip Davis, and directed by Resnik, this "kaleidescope of Jewish classical song" featured Resnik as narrator and has been televised and shown on CUNY TV; all three concerts were also released on DVD in September 2011 by vaimusic.com (VAI 4540).

== Awards and honors ==
Celebrations of her career began in New York City when "Regina Resnik Day" was proclaimed. She received the Lawrence Tibbett Award from the American Guild of Musical Artists and a special tribute from Lincoln Center. The city of Venice honored her 50th anniversary in a special event. The 60th anniversary of her career was celebrated by the Metropolitan Opera Guild at Lincoln Center in New York.

Hunter College invested her with an Honorary Doctorate in Humane Letters and, in 2007, the New England Conservatory honored her with a Doctorate of Music. She served as a trustee of the Hunter Foundation and as a member of the jury of the Peabody Awards for Radio and Television. She also served as a member of the Board of Directors of the Metropolitan Opera Guild and the Board of Advisors of CUNY TV.
