= The Ford Sunday Evening Hour =

American concert radio series

- Other names: Ford Hour; Ford Summer Hour; The Ford Symphony Hour
- Genre: Classical music
- Running time: 1 hour
- Country of origin: United States
- Language(s): English
- Syndicates: CBS
- Announcer: Ron Gamble
- Original release: 1934 – 1946

The Ford Sunday Evening Hour is an American concert radio series sponsored by the Ford Motor Company. The hour-long program was broadcast from 1934 to 1946, with a hiatus from 1942 to 1945. Later known as The Ford Symphony Hour, the program presented selections of classical music, hymns, popular ballads and well-known arias.

The series featured a rotation of different conductors, including Victor Kolar, Fritz Reiner, Wilfred Pelletier and John Barbirolli. Soloists included soprano Kirsten Flagstad, tenor Thomas Hayward, Helen Jepson, contralto Gladys Swarthout, tenor Richard Tauber, baritone John Charles Thomas (a 1936-37 regular) and Lawrence Tibbett.

For the first two seasons, programs originated from Orchestra Hall in Detroit, Michigan. Demand for seats was so great, however, that Detroit's Masonic Temple Auditorium, which had more than twice as many seats, was used beginning in the fall of 1936.

== Background ==
William Reddick became producer of the program in 1936. Henry Ford was closely involved in the program, from choosing the theme (The Children's Prayer from Hansel and Gretel) to hiring the Detroit Symphony Orchestra.

On CBS, the series began October 7, 1934, on Sunday evenings at 9pm, continuing until March 1, 1942. It returned Sundays at 8pm on ABC September 30, 1945, airing until June 23, 1946. During the weekly intermission, William John Cameron (former editor of the Dearborn Independent and directly responsible for the publication in the 1920s of the anti-Semitic Protocols of the Elders of Zion), of the Ford Motor Company, delivered brief talks on a variety of topics from sports to economics. These talks were collected into several books published by Ford.

Announcers included Ron Gamble and Truman Bradley.

== Replacements ==
During the summer months, it was replaced by The Ford Summer Hour, featuring Donald Voorhees, Meredith Willson, James Melton, Francia White and Jane Pickens.

One week after The Ford Sunday Evening Hour came to an end, the Ford Motor Company launched The Ford Festival of American Music which offered the full spectrum of popular music, from swing to show tunes, along with folk and classical selections. Leigh Harline conducted the orchestra, and Alfred Drake was the host of the show, produced by George Zachary. It aired from June 30 to September 22, 1946.

== Re-enactment ==
On July 28, 1963, the National High School Symphony Orchestra of Interlochen, Michigan, performed a re-enactment of the program to commemorate the 100th anniversary of Henry Ford's birth and the 60th anniversary of Ford Motor Company.

== See also ==
- Ford Theatre
- General Motors Concerts
