= Ivan Narodny =

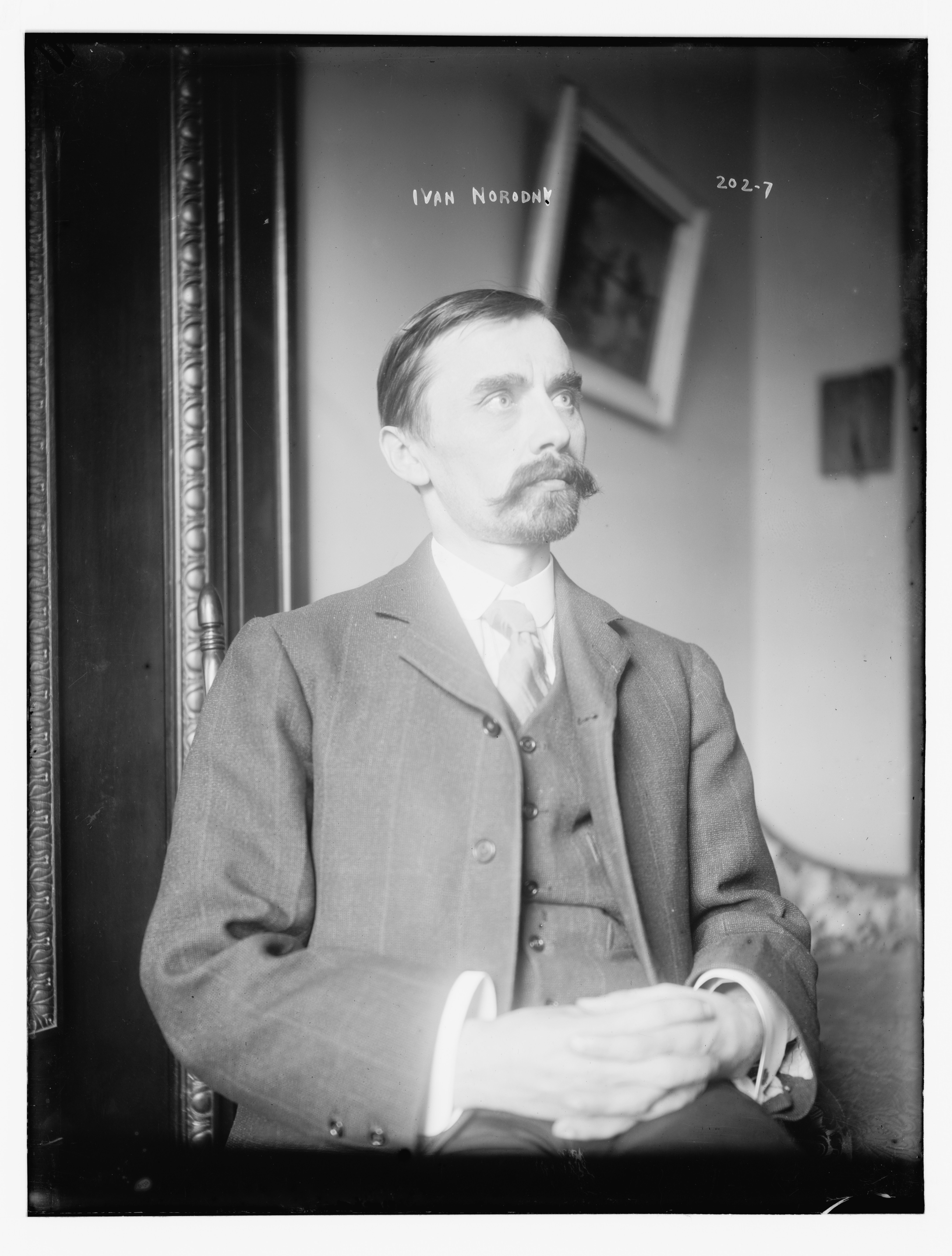
Ivan Narodny

Ivan Ivanovich Narodny (Russian: Иван Иванович Народный) (1870–1953) was a Russian émigré who came to New York City in 1906 with Maxim Gorky to raise the profile of the Revolutionary Movement in Russia.

Narodny was born in Estonia with the original name Jaan Sibbul. He was the son of Jaan Sibbul (1840–1920) and Madli Ago (1830–1919).

According to FBI files he had been imprisoned in Estonia in 1898. In an interview in the New York Times he said he had been involved in revolutionary activity in Kronstadt during the 1905 Russian Revolution.

He was bitter that intellectuals were suppressed in Russia. About forming a Russian musical society with 4 women, including his wife, he wrote: "We were called terrorists, and a systematic agitation was started by the government's officials against our activity." After moving to the U.S.: "My Russian art and musical articles in the American periodicals were declared the dangerous efforts of an agitator."

Narodny organized a dinner in honor of Gorky on 12 April at the A Club Fifth Avenue and provided a setting for the announcement of a new committee to support the proposed Russian Revolution. This committee included Mark Twain, William Dean Howells, Robert J. Collier and Finley Peter Dunne.

In 1915 the Russian Imperial Government published advertisements in New York newspapers to undermine him presenting himself as a self-proclaimed "Russian Chamber of Commerce". He was involved in the arms trade selling munitions to Russia via Japan and Vladivostok.

In 1916 he had an article about Mikhail Artsybashev published in Drama.

He is considered to be one of the Estonian first sci-fi writers. In 1912 The San Francisco Call published his story The Artificial man, while later his two stories were published in the magazine The Pilgrims Almanach. In 1923 his play The Skygirl was staged, which depicted life in the future.

In 1917, following the February Revolution Narodny presented himself as head of the Russian-American Asiatic Corporation and announced that the Russian Duma was forming the "United States of Russia".
