= Metropolitan Opera Auditions of the Air =

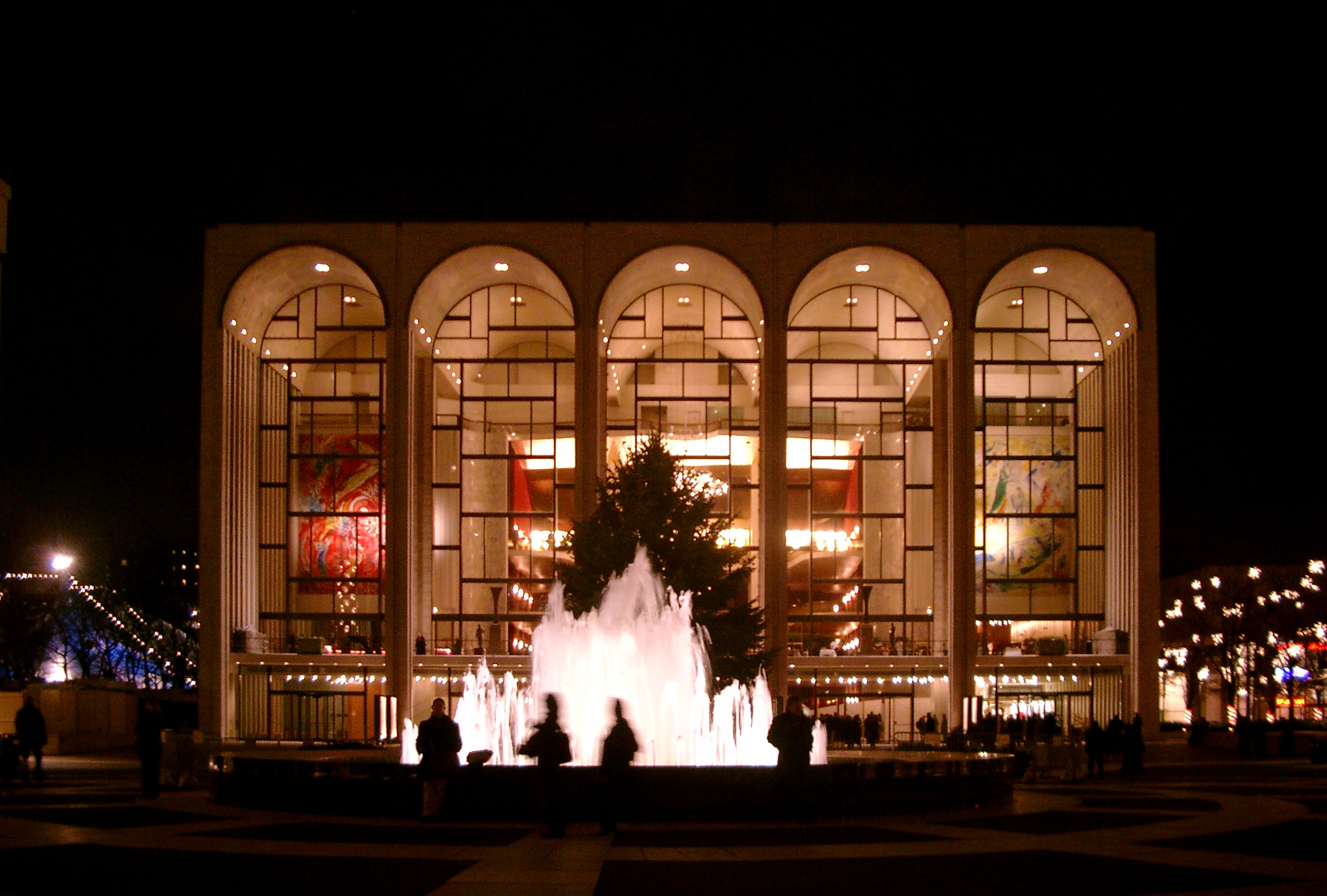
Metropolitan Opera, New York City

The Metropolitan Opera Auditions of the Air was an annual singing competition sponsored by the Metropolitan Opera of New York City for more than two decades. The competition's purpose was to find, encourage, and promote developing young opera singers with promising future careers. Winners of the competition were given a cash prize and the opportunity to perform opera selections on the radio with the Metropolitan Opera Orchestra.

== History ==
Established in 1935 by newly appointed Met director Edward Johnson, the Metropolitan Opera Auditions of the Air was also broadcast live on radio. It was initially broadcast on NBC Radio (Red Network), switching in 1937 to NBC's Blue Network (which would become ABC Radio). Radio broadcasts continued until 1958. In 1952 it was also televised as a series on ABC television. Given the number of contestants, the competition was heard through a series of broadcasts that spanned several weeks.

Concerned that the competition was becoming merely a tool for promoting singers in New York City, the Met created the Metropolitan Opera National Council Auditions in 1954 as a means of finding and bringing in talented young opera singers from all across the United States. At this point the competition was sometimes referred to as the Metropolitan Opera National Council Auditions of the Air. The first two winners of the competition were the tenor Arthur Carron and the contralto Ana Kaskas, both of which became resident artists at the Met soon after. The competition ceased to operate in 1958, but the Met continues to operate the National Council Auditions.

== Notable winners ==
- Martina Arroyo
- Grace Bumbry
- Marilyn Cotlow
- Annamary Dickey
- Frank Guarrera
- Mack Harrell
- Thomas Hayward
- William Hargrave
- Margaret Harshaw
- Lansing Hatfield
- Lois Hunt
- Christine Johnson
- An(n)a Kaskas
- Arthur Kent
- Robert Merrill
- Patrice Munsel
- Regina Resnik
- Eleanor Steber
- Maxine Stellman
- Hugh Roderick Thompson
- Leonard Warren
