= Tom, Tom, the Piper's Son =

English nursery rhyme and song

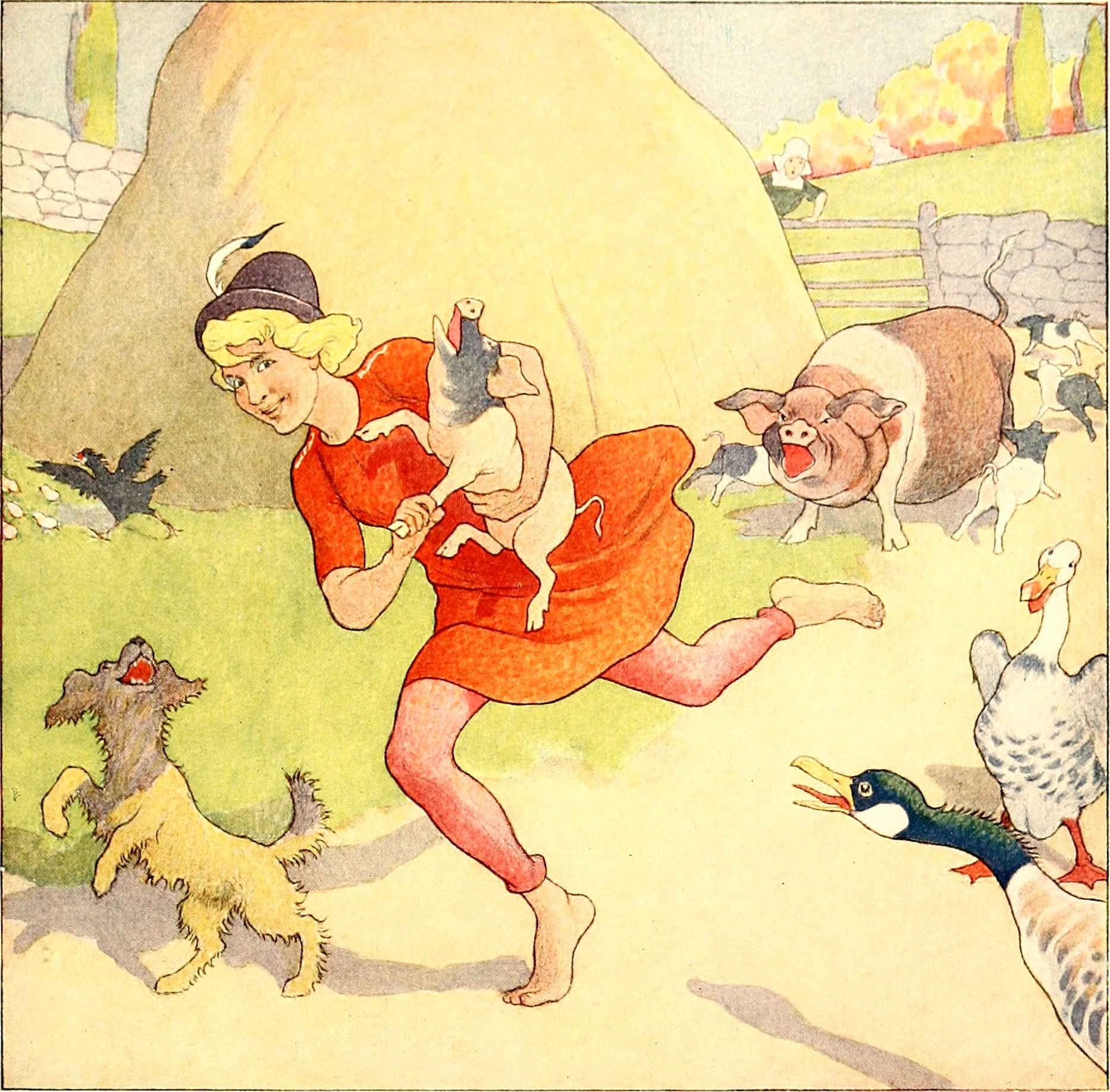
- From The Boy Smith Mother Goose (1920)

Nursery rhyme
- Published: 1795
- Songwriter(s): Traditional

"Tom, Tom, the Piper's Son" is a popular English language nursery rhyme. It has a Roud Folk Song Index number of 19621.

== Lyrics and melody ==
Source
Benjamin Britten used the traditional melody (1877) in his 1954 opera The Turn of the Screw.

Modern versions of the rhyme include:

Tom, Tom, the piper's son,
Stole a pig (Note: The 'pig' mentioned in the song is almost certainly not a live animal but rather a kind of pastry, often made with an apple filling, smaller than a pie.), and away did run.
The pig was eat, and Tom was beat,
And Tom went crying down the street. (Note: In some versions: "Which sent him" "roaring" or "howling")

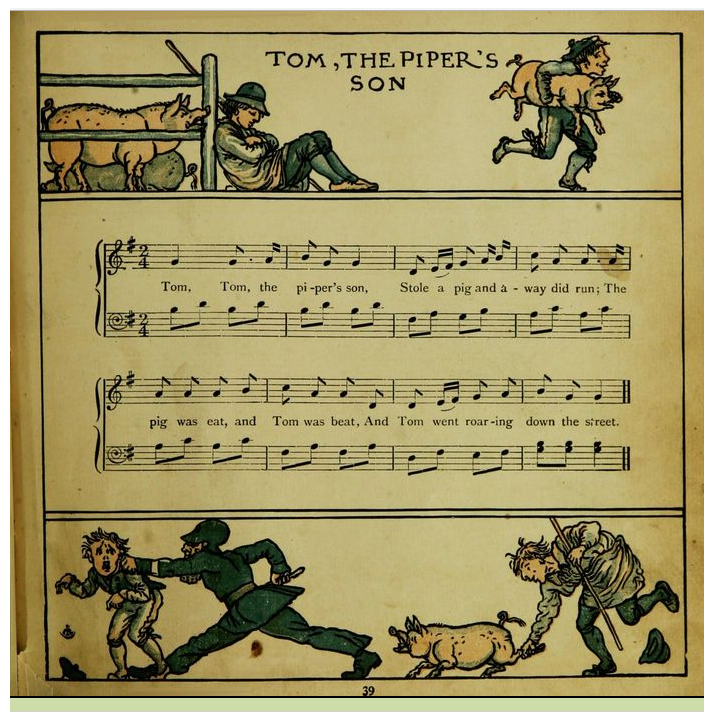
Lyrics for "Tom, Tom, the Piper's Son" and illustrations show a boy stealing a pig and being stopped by the police, in The Baby's Opera: A Book of Old Rhymes and the Music by the Earliest Masters, c. 1877

Another version of the rhyme is:

Tom, Tom, the piper's son,
Stole a pig, and away he run.
Tom run here, Tom run there,
Tom run through the village square.

This rhyme is often conflated with a separate and longer rhyme:

Tom, he was a piper's son,
He learnt to play when he was young,
And all the tune that he could play
Was 'over the hills and far away';
Over the hills and a great way off,
The wind shall blow my top-knot off.

Tom with his pipe made such a noise,
That he pleased both the girls and boys,
They all stopped to hear him play,
'Over the hills and far away'.

Tom with his pipe did play with such skill
That those who heard him could never keep still;
As soon as he played they began for to dance,
Even the pigs on their hind legs would after him prance.

As Dolly was milking her cow one day,
Tom took his pipe and began to play;
So Dolly and the cow danced 'The Cheshire Round',
Till the pail was broken and the milk ran on the ground.

He met old Dame Trot with a basket of eggs,
He used his pipe and she used her legs;
She danced about till the eggs were all broke,
She began for to fret, but he laughed at the joke.

Tom saw a cross fellow was beating an ass,
Heavy laden with pots, pans, dishes, and glass;
He took out his pipe and he played them a tune,
And the poor donkey's load was lightened full soon.

== Origins ==
Both rhymes were first printed separately in a Tom the Piper's Son, a chapbook produced around 1795 in London, England. The origins of the shorter and better known rhyme are unknown.

The second, longer rhyme was an adaptation of an existing verse which was current in England around the end of the seventeenth and beginning of the eighteenth centuries. The following verse, known as "The Distracted Jockey's Lamentations", may have been written for (but not included in) Thomas d'Urfey's 1698 play The Campaigners:

Jockey was a Piper's Son,
And fell in love when he was young;
But all the Tunes that he could play,
Was, o'er the Hills, and far away,
And 'Tis o'er the Hills, and far away,
'Tis o'er the Hills, and far away,
'Tis o'er the Hills, and far away,
The Wind has blown my Plad away.

This verse seems to have been adapted for a recruiting song designed to gain volunteers for the Duke of Marlborough's campaigns about 1705, with the title "The Recruiting Officer; or The Merry Volunteers", better today known as "Over the Hills and Far Away", in which the hero is called Tom.
