= Dimitri Mitropoulos =

Greek and American conductor (1896–1960)

- Δημήτρης Μητρόπουλος
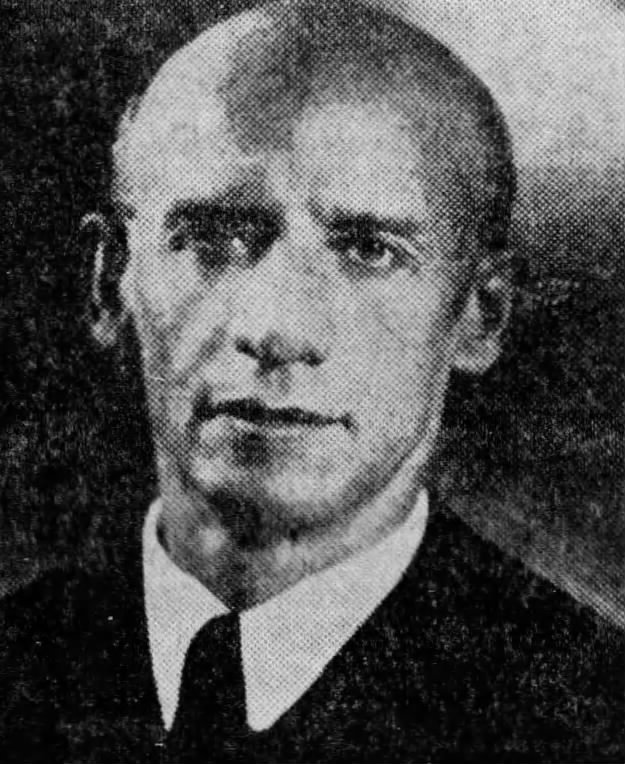
- Mitropoulos in early 1944
- Born: Dimitris Mitropoulos; 18 February 1896; Athens, Greece
- Died: 2 November 1960 (aged 64); Milan, Italy
- Resting place: First Cemetery of Athens
- Occupations: Conductor, pianist, composer
- Known for: Conductor of the Minneapolis Symphony Orchestra, New York Philharmonic, Metropolitan Opera, Vienna State Opera

Dimitri Mitropoulos (Greek: Δημήτρης Μητρόπουλος; 1 March [O.S. 18 February] 1896 – 2 November 1960) was a Greek and American conductor, pianist, and composer.

== Life and career ==
Mitropoulos was born in Athens, the son of Yannis and Angelikē (Angeliki) Mitropoulos. His father owned a leather goods shop in downtown Athens. He was musically precocious, demonstrating his abilities at an early age. From the ages of eleven to fourteen, when Mitropoulos was in secondary school, he would host and preside over informal musical gatherings at his house every Saturday afternoon. His earliest acknowledged composition – a sonata for violin and piano, now lost – dates from this period. His opera Soeur Béatrice, based on the play by Maurice Maeterlinck, premiered in 1919.

He studied music at the Athens Conservatoire, as well as in Brussels and Berlin, with Ferruccio Busoni among his teachers. In 1921 he conducted the inaugural music of the Bavarian Socialist Republic. From 1921 to 1925 he assisted Erich Kleiber at the Berlin State Opera and then took a number of posts in Greece. At a 1930 concert with the Berlin Philharmonic, finding that his soloist was sick, he played the solo part of Prokofiev's Piano Concerto No. 3 and conducted the orchestra from the keyboard, becoming one of the first to do so.

=== United States ===
Mitropoulos made his U.S. debut in 1936 with the Boston Symphony Orchestra, and he later settled in the country, becoming a citizen in 1946. From 1937 to 1949 he served as principal conductor of the Minneapolis Symphony Orchestra (forerunner of today's Minnesota Orchestra).

External audio
- Mitropoulos conducting Prokofiev's Lieutenant Kijé Suite, Op. 60 with the New York Philharmonic in 1956, on archive.org
- Mitropoulos conducting his orchestral transcription of J.S. Bach's Great Fantasia and Fugue in G minor, BWV 542 with the Minneapolis Symphony Orchestra in 1942, on archive.org

In 1949 Mitropoulos began his association with the New York Philharmonic. He was initially co-conductor with Leopold Stokowski and became the sole music director in 1951. Mitropoulos recorded extensively with the Philharmonic for Columbia Records and sought to reach new audiences in the city through appearances on television and by conducting performances at the Roxy Theatre, a popular movie theatre in 1950–51. He expanded the philharmonic's repertoire, commissioning works by new composers and championing the symphonies of Gustav Mahler. In 1955, Philharmonic's performance under Mitropoulos at the Odeon of Herodes Atticus was the main event of the inaugural edition of Athens Festival. In 1957, he conducted the Brass Ensemble Of The Jazz And Classical Music Society in an early foray into Third stream. In 1958, he was succeeded as the philharmonic's conductor by a protégé, Leonard Bernstein. In January 1960, he guest conducted the philharmonic in a performance of Mahler's Fifth Symphony, which was recorded.

=== Work in opera ===
In addition to his orchestral career, Mitropoulos conducted opera extensively in Italy, and from 1954 until his death in 1960 was the principal conductor of the Metropolitan Opera in New York, although the Met never had an official 'principal conductor' title until the 1970s. His musically incisive and dramatically vivid performances of Puccini, Verdi, Richard Strauss and others remain models of the opera conductor's art. The Met's extensive archive of recorded broadcasts preserves many of these fine performances.

Mitropoulos's series of recordings for Columbia Records with the New York Philharmonic included a rare complete performance of Alban Berg's Wozzeck. Many of these have been reissued by Sony Classics on CD, including most recently his stereo recordings of excerpts from Prokofiev's Romeo and Juliet. He recorded with the Minneapolis Symphony for RCA Victor during the 78-rpm era. He was also represented on the Cetra Records label, most notably with an early recording of Richard Strauss's Elektra.

Mitropoulos premiered many contemporary works. Examples include the American premieres of Shostakovich's Tenth Symphony (1954) and First Violin Concerto (1956) and the world premieres of Barber's Vanessa (1958), Ernst Krenek's Fourth Symphony (1947), and John J. Becker's Short Symphony (1950).

=== Personal life ===
Mitropoulos was noted for having an eidetic memory (which enabled him to conduct without a score, even during rehearsals) and for his monk-like life style due to his deeply religious, Greek Orthodox beliefs.

Mitropoulos was "quietly known to be homosexual" and "felt no need for a cosmetic marriage". Mitropoulos was a close friend and mentor to William Bast.

Mitropoulos died in Milan, Italy at the age of 64 of heart failure, while rehearsing Mahler's Third Symphony at the La Scala Opera House. One of his last recorded performances was Verdi's La forza del destino with Giuseppe Di Stefano, Antonietta Stella and Ettore Bastianini in Vienna on 23 September 1960. On 31 October 1960, two days before his death, Mitropoulos conducted Mahler's Third Symphony with the Cologne Radio Symphony Orchestra. The performance was recorded and later issued commercially.

External audio
- Mitropoulos conducting Kodály's Háry János Suite with the New York Philharmonic in 1953 On archive.org

- Arfanis, Stathis A. The Complete Discography of Dimitri Mitropoulos. Athens: Irinna S.A., 1990. ISBN 960-7110-00-5.
- Mitropoulos, Dimitri, and Katsoyanis, Katy: A Correspondence, 1930–1960. New York: Martin Dale, 1973. Introductions by Louis Biancolli and Katy Katsoyanis. LC Number 73075338.
- Trotter, William R. Priest of Music: The Life of Dimitri Mitropoulos. Portland, Oregon: Amadeus Press, 1995. ISBN 0-931340-81-0.
- "Baton for Bernstein", Time, 25 November 1957, archived from the original on 25 February 2005
- Alessandro Zignani, Dimitri Mitropoulos. Una luce che incatena il cielo, 2008, Zecchini Editore, pagg. 240 con discografia, ISBN 88-87203-67-9
