= Bernard Rogers =

American composer (1893–1968)

Bernard Rogers (4 February 1893 – 24 May 1968) was an American composer. His best known work is The Passion, an oratorio written in 1942.

== Life and career ==
External audio
- Bernard Rogers's Soliloquy for Flute and String Orchestra performed by Howard Hanson conducting the Eastman-Rochester Symphony Orchestra and Joseph Mariano, flute in 1941 Here on archive.org

Rogers was born in New York City. He studied with Arthur Farwell, Ernest Bloch, Percy Goetschius, and Nadia Boulanger. He taught at the Cleveland Institute of Music, The Hartt School, and the Eastman School of Music. His pupils included Stephen Albert, Dominick Argento, Jacob Avshalomov, William Bergsma, David Borden, Will Gay Bottje, David Diamond, Walter Hartley, Ronald Lo Presti, Ulysses Kay, Louis Mennini, John La Montaine, W. Francis McBeth, Ron Nelson, Burrill Phillips, Alice McElroy Procter, Gardner Read, H. Owen Reed, Margaret Vardell Sandresky, Robert Ward, John Weinzweig, Norma Wendelburg, Richard Lane, Clifton Williams and Laurence Rosenthal among others.

He joined the Eastman faculty in 1929. He composed five operas, five symphonies, other works for orchestra, chamber music, three cantatas, choral music and Lieder. His one-act opera The Warrior, for which Norman Corwin wrote the libretto, received its premiere at The Metropolitan Opera on January 11, 1947.

He was a National Patron of Delta Omicron, an international professional music fraternity.

Rogers retired from Eastman in 1967. He died in Rochester on May 24, 1968, two days after a heart attack.
