= Leontyne Price discography =

Discography of American soprano

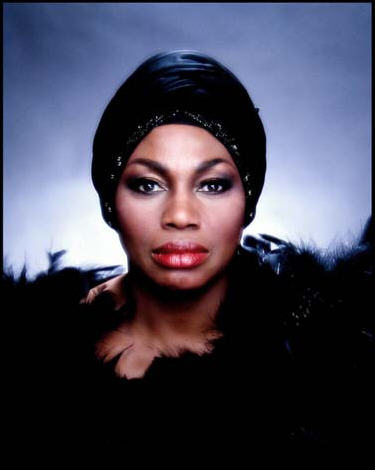
Leontyne Price. This photograph was used on the cover of the 1981 album Leontyne Price Sings Verdi.

The discography of Leontyne Price, an American soprano, consists of studio albums; complete opera recordings; recordings of symphonic and choral works such as oratorios and masses; and live concert, recital, and opera recordings. Her recordings have won a total of thirteen Grammy Awards, and she has been nominated for a Grammy Award twenty-five times. In addition to her competitive Grammy wins, Price was the recipient of the Grammy Lifetime Achievement Award at the 31st Annual Grammy Awards in 1989.

Price's professional recording career began in 1955 when she recorded Samuel Barber's song cycle Hermit Songs for Columbia Records. Price is closely associated with Barber and his music, and several recordings of her singing his compositions have been made; many of them written specifically for her. On the opera stage and on record she is closely associated with the operas of Verdi, Puccini, and Mozart. Her final studio opera recording was released in 1979, and her final live opera recording was made in 1985 when she made her farewell performance as Aida on the stage of the Metropolitan Opera (Met). Her last recording was of the song "America the Beautiful" which was released by RCA in 1992 on the album A Salute to American Music. Price is also highly regarded for the Primma Donna collection; a series of five albums of opera arias released between 1966 and 1980 that encompass a wide range of songs which she sang for this collection but mostly did not perform on the opera stage.

== Overview ==
=== First recording and association with Samuel Barber ===
Leontyne Price is considered the first African-American soprano to receive international acclaim. She made her first professional recording in 1955 with Columbia Records for its "Modern American Music Series"; performing Barber's Hermit Songs with the composer at the piano This song cycle was written for Price, and the work was given its first performance by her at the Library of Congress two years earlier. The premiere on October 30, 1953 was privately recorded, and later released on disc in 2004 by Bridge Records; making it the earliest commercially available recording of Price's singing voice.

Price frequently performed Barber's music in concerts and recitals. Live recordings of some of these performances given in 1953 and 1968 were compiled into the compilation album Leontyne Price Sings Barber (1994, RCA). She also won a Grammy Award for the 1969 RCA album Samuel Barber: Two Scenes from Antony and Cleopatra / Knoxville: Summer of 1915. The concert suite Two Scenes from "Anthony and Cleopatra" was crafted from two arias Barber wrote specifically for Price's voice in the opera Antony and Cleopatra. Price created the role of Cleopatra in the world premiere of this opera which was notably commissioned and performed for the grand opening of the newly built Metropolitan Opera House on September 16, 1966.

=== NBC Tosca recording, Porgy and Bess, and RCA contract ===
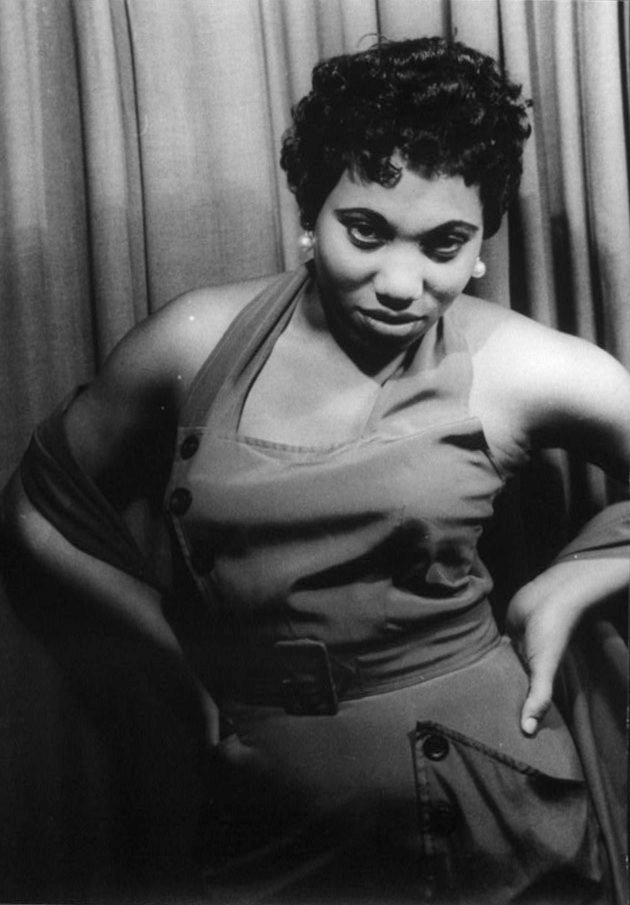
Price in Porgy and Bess in 1953

The earliest recording of Price performing in an opera comes from the year 1955 when she performed the title role in Puccini's Tosca in a live televised broadcast for the NBC Opera Theatre on January 23, 1955. This performance not only marked Price's grand opera debut, but was also the first instance of a black singer starring in an opera on television. It is considered a significant moment in the breaking of the color barrier during the Civil Rights Movement as Price achieved this at a time when black singers were largely barred from the opera stage in the United States due to racial prejudice. While a complete version of this opera recording is only available in archives, excerpts from the recording were released on CD by Legato Classics in 1998.

The success of the NBC Tosca led to Price being offered a contract with the San Francisco Opera; her first with an American opera company. Prior to this Price had starred as Bess in the third revival of Gershwin's opera Porgy and Bess from 1952-1954; a work now regarded as an opera masterwork but then viewed more as a musical. While this production was not recorded, Price later performed excerpts from this opera with her husband William Warfield as Porgy for the Grammy Award winning 1963 RCA record Great Scenes from Gershwin's "Porgy and Bess". When she made her San Francisco debut in 1957 as Madame Lidoine in Poulenc's Dialogues des Carmélites the performance was attended by RCA's director Alan Kayes. Kayes was impressed and offered her contract with RCA Victor Red Seal which she signed in 1958.

=== Recording legacy with mostly RCA ===
The majority of Price's recording output was made with RCA with whom she recorded music throughout her career. Many of her RCA records have also been re-released by BMG Records. Her first recording as a contract singer under RCA was a 1959 album of Beethoven's Symphony No. 9 made with conductor Charles Munch, the Boston Symphony Orchestra, and the chorus of the New England Conservatory. Price was celebrated for her performances in Symphony No. 9 with orchestras around the world, and the work was described as her "calling card" on the international stage. Another concert work with which she was closely associated was Verdi's Requiem which she recorded twice for RCA studio albums; a 1960 record with Fritz Reiner and the Vienna Philharmonic and a 1977 album with Georg Solti and the Chicago Symphony Orchestra.

Price's first solo album, the 1959 record A Program Of Song, won the 1961 Grammy Award for Best Classical Performance – Vocal Soloist. She later had a record winning streak in this category; winning this award consecutively for five years from 1964 through 1968 (honoring the years 1963-1967). By the end of her recording career, Price had won a total of thirteen Grammy Awards, and been nominated for a Grammy Award twenty-five times. In 1989 she was the recipient of the Grammy Lifetime Achievement Award at the 31st Annual Grammy Awards in 1989.

On the opera stage, Price is celebrated for becoming the first black singer to have a sustained career at the Met. Several live recordings of her performances from Met stage have been released by Sony Records. In Europe, Price had a productive relationship with conductor Herbert von Karajan with whom she recorded for RCA, Deutsche Grammophon, and Decca Records. Karajan notably conducted Price in her European debut as Verdi's Aida at the Vienna State Opera in 1958. She repeated that role soon after in highly acclaimed performances at the Royal Opera House in London and La Scala in Milan among other European theaters. Considered "the Aida" of her generation, Price made two different Grammy Award winning recordings of this opera for RCA.

Price also achieved acclaim internationally in several other operas by Verdi, including Il trovatore, La forza del destino, and Un ballo in maschera; all of which she recorded for RCA. Besides Verdi, Price was frequently heard on the stage in the operas of Puccini and Mozart and recorded multiple operas by both composers for RCA. Her 1961 Grammy winning self titled album Leontyne Price (also known as Operatic Arias and often called "the blue album") was dedicated to the music of Verdi and Puccini, and she won another Grammy Award for her 1973 album Puccini Heroines. With tenor Plácido Domingo she recorded the Grammy nominated album Verdi & Puccini Duets (1975), and her 1981 album Leontyne Price Sings Verdi, recorded with the Israel Philharmonic Orchestra and conductor Zubin Mehta, won a Grammy in 1983.

In 1966 RCA released the album Leontyne Price, Prima Donna: Great Soprano Arias from Purcell to Barber which featured Price singing operatic repertoire that she mainly never performed on the stage from a broad range of composers and musical periods. She released four more volumes or albums in this series in the years 1967, 1970, 1978, and 1980. A box set of these works, Leontyne Price: A Prima Donna Collection, was first released on tape in 1983, and then later on CD in 1992. Anthony Tommasini of The New York Times described the overall reception of the Prima Donna collection as "critically hailed" in his assessment of Price's recording career. Consisting of 47 opera arias across five discs, opera historian Clyde T. McCants stated that "the Prima Donna Collection is by all accounts the most comprehensive demonstration of the art of the soprano that has ever been committed to disc by a single artist."

=== Final recordings ===
Price's final complete studio opera recording was the role of Ariadne in Ariadne auf Naxos by R. Strauss which was released by RCA in 1977. Live recordings of Price continued until the very end of her opera career; including her farewell performance as Aida at the Metropolitan Opera in 1985 which was filmed for television broadcast on PBS. After retiring from the opera stage, Price continued to work as a recitalist until giving her final recital in 1998. Among her later recordings was a 1985 recital she gave for the grand opening of the Ordway Center for the Performing Arts, and a live concert at Avery Fisher Hall, A Salute to American Music, given on November 10, 1991, which featured Price singing "America the Beautiful" as well as introducing songs performed by other singers.

Price is also closely associated with another patriotic song, "God Bless America", which she famously sang a cappella before the United States Congress in 1981 with altered lyrics aimed at compelling the US government to not cut funding for the arts. She later recorded the song with its original words as both a single and a track on her Grammy nominated 1982 patriotic album God Bless America. She came out of retirement to perform the song at Carnegie Hall in a special concert honoring the victims of the September 11 attacks which was given on September 30, 2001 just nineteen days after the tragedy.

== Studio albums ==
Title	Year	Label	Notes	References
Hermit Songs / String Quartet No. 1	1955	Columbia Masterworks	This was an album featuring the music of Samuel Barber. Price performed the song cycle Hermit Songs with Barber at the piano. The album also included Barber's String Quartet No. 1 played by the Juilliard String Quartet. This was Price's first professional recording.	
A Program Of Song	1959	RCA Victor Red Seal	This recording was Price's first album as a solo artist, and was released in December 1959. A recital of German lieder and French chanson, it featured David Garvey as her accompanist. It won the 1961 Grammy Award for Best Classical Performance – Vocal Soloist. Price was also nominated that year for the Grammy Award for Best New Artist which she lost to Bob Newhart.	
Leontyne Price (also known as Operatic Arias)	1961	RCA Victor Red Seal	Price's self titled album Leontyne Price, often referred to as "the blue album", is also known as Operatic Arias. Contains arias from the operas Aida, Il trovatore, Madama Butterfly, La Rondine, Tosca, and Turandot. It was nominated for the 1962 Grammy Award for Best Classical Performance – Vocal Soloist (with or without orchestra). In 1998 RCA Living Stereo/BMG released a remastered version of the album under the title Leontyne Price: Verdi & Puccini Arias.	
A Christmas Offering (also known as Christmas with Leontyne Price)	1961	London Stereo	A Christmas album with Price singing mainly Christmas hymns with conductor Herbert von Karajan and the Vienna Philharmonic. It was released in the United States under the title A Christmas Offering by London Stereo. In the United Kingdom it was released by Decca Records under the title Christmas with Leontyne Price. The album has been reissued multiple time; most recently in a remastered version by Decca in 2004.	
Leontyne Price – Swing Low, Sweet Chariot	1962	RCA Victor Red Seal	A recording of fourteen African American spirituals made with a studio orchestra conducted by Leonard De Paur.	
Great Scenes from Gershwin's "Porgy and Bess"	1963	RCA Victor Red Seal	Excerpts of the opera Porgy and Bess. Price sang the role of Bess with her husband William Warfield as Porgy. Also included were the original Sportin' Life, John W. Bubbles, and McHenry Boatwright. It won the 1964 Grammy Award for Best Classical Performance – Vocal Soloist (with or without orchestra). A remastered version was released by BMG in 1999.	
Salome: Dance of the Seven Veils/ Interlude and Final Scene; The Egyptian Helen : Awakening Scene	1965	RCA Victor	Excerpts from the operas Salome and Die ägyptische Helena by Richard Strauss. Sung with Erich Leinsdorf and the Boston Symphony Orchestra. This recording won the 1966 Grammy Award for Best Classical Vocal Soloist Performance. It was also nominated for the Grammy Award for Classical Album of the Year.	
Leontyne Price / My Favorite Hymns	1966	RCA Victor Red Seal	Twelve hymns performed with organist George Decker and the Saint Thomas Choir of Men and Boys of New York. The chorus was led by conductor William Self who was organist and choirmaster at Saint Thomas Church in Manhattan.	
Leontyne Price, Prima Donna: Great Soprano Arias from Purcell to Barber	1966	RCA Victor Red Seal	Studio recording of ten opera arias performed with the RCA Italiana Opera Orchestra under the baton of conductor Francesco Molinari-Pradelli. This recording won the 1967 Grammy Award for Best Classical Vocal Soloist Performance (with or without orchestra).	
Leontyne Price, Prima Donna/ Volume 2: Great Soprano Arias From Handel To Puccini	1967	RCA Victor Red Seal	Another studio recording performed with Francesco Molinari-Pradelli and RCA Italiana Opera Orchestra. This album contains nine opera arias. A compilation of both Volume 1 and Volume 2 of Prima Donna was also released in 1967. This recording won the 1968 Grammy Award for Best Classical Vocal Soloist Performance.	
Right As The Rain: Leontyne Price / André Previn	1967	RCA Victor Red Seal	An album of songs from Broadway musicals sung by Price with André Previn conducting the André Previn Orchestra. Previn also arranged and orchestrated the songs and played piano on the album.	
Samuel Barber: Two Scenes from "Antony and Cleopatra" / Knoxville: Summer of 1915	1969	RCA Victor Red Seal	Thomas Schippers conducts the New Philharmonia Orchestra with Price singing Samuel Barber's Two Scenes from "Antony and Cleopatra" and Knoxville: Summer of 1915. This recording won the 1970 Grammy Award for Best Vocal Soloist Performance, Classical.	
Leontyne Price Sings Mozart Operatic and Concert Arias	1969	RCA Victor Red Seal	Price sings a total of seven arias, both opera and concert, by Wolfgang Amadeus Mozart. Peter Herman Adler conducts the New Philharmonia Orchestra.	
Leontyne Price, Prima Donna/ Volume 3: Great Soprano Arias From Gluck To Poulenc	1970	RCA Victor Red Seal	Sir Edward Downes conducts Price and the London Symphony Orchestra in fifteen opera arias. This recording was nominated for the 1971 Grammy Award for Best Classical Vocal Soloist Performance.	
Wish I Knew How It Would Feel To Be Free	1971	RCA Victor Red Seal	Price's second album of African American spirituals. These are performed with the Rust College Choir under the direction of Lassaye Van Buren Holmes. Proceeds for this album were given to fund scholarships to Rust College.	
Leontyne Price Sings Robert Schumann	1971	RCA Victor Red Seal	Pianist David Garvey accompanies Price in album dedicated entirely to the lieder of Robert Schumann. This recording won the 1972 Grammy Award for Best Classical Vocal Soloist Performance.	
5 Great Operatic Scenes	1972	RCA Victor Red Seal	Price sings excerpts from La traviata, Eugene Onegin, Don Carlo, Ariadne auf Naxos, and Fidelio with the London Symphony Orchestra and conductor Fausto Cleva. This recording was nominated for the 1973 Grammy Award for Best Classical Vocal Soloist Performance.	
Leontyne Price – Puccini Heroines	1973	RCA Victor Red Seal	This album was recorded in London in 1972 and released by RCA in 1973. Price sings arias for several operas by Giacomo Puccini; including La bohème, Le Villi, Edgar, Manon Lescaut, Tosca, La Rondine, Madama Butterfly, and La fanciulla del West. Edward Downes conducts the New Philharmonia Orchestra. It won the 1974 Grammy Award for Best Classical Vocal Soloist Performance.	
Leontyne Price Sings Richard Strauss	1974	RCA Victor Red Seal	Price performs Four Last Songs, and excerpts from Die Frau ohne Schatten, Der Rosenkavalier, and Guntram with the New Philharmonia Orchestra and conductor Erich Leinsdorf. It won the 1975 Grammy Award for Best Classical Vocal Soloist Performance.	
Weihnachtskonzert	1974	Decca Records	Price performs music by Giovanni Gabrieli, Johann Sebastian Bach, and Wolfgang Amadeus Mozart with the Vienna Philharmonic under Herbert von Karajan.	
Verdi & Puccini Duets	1975	RCA Victor Red Seal	Nello Santi conducts the New Philharmonia Orchestra in an album of opera duets by composers Verdi and Puccini which are sung by Price and tenor Plácido Domingo. It was nominated for the 1976 Grammy Award for Best Classical Vocal Soloist Performance.	
Leontyne Price: Portrait	1976	RCA	Francesco Molinari-Pradelli conducts the RCA Italiana Opera Orchestra and Edward Downes the London Symphony Orchestra in this album of 19 opera arias.	
Leontyne Price, Prima Donna/ Volume 4: Great Soprano Arias From Mozart To Menotti	1978	RCA Victor Red Seal	Price sings eleven opera arias with the New Philharmonia Orchestra led by Nello Santi.	
Lieder by Schubert and Richard Strauss	1979	Angel Records	Price is accompanied by pianist David Garvey in an album of German lieder by Franz Schubert and Richard Strauss. It was nominated for the 1980 Grammy Award for Best Classical Vocal Soloist Performance.	
Leontyne Price, Prima Donna/ Volume 5: Great Soprano Arias From Handel To Britten	1980	RCA Victor Red Seal	Henry Lewis conducts Price and the New Philharmonia Orchestra in seven opera arias. It won the 1981 Grammy Award for Best Classical Vocal Soloist Performance.	
Leontyne Price – Primadonna Assoluta	1980	Ullstein Musik	Oliviero De Fabritiis conducts Price and the Orchestra Del Teatro dell'Opera di Roma in an album of Verdi arias.	
Leontyne Price Sings Verdi	1981	London Records	Price sings Verdi arias with the Israel Philharmonic Orchestra conducted by Zubin Mehta. The recording won the 1983 Grammy Award for Best Classical Vocal Soloist Performance.	
God Bless America	1982	RCA	Charles Gerhardt conducts Price and the National Philharmonic Orchestra in an album of predominantly American patriotic songs. The recording was nominated for the Grammy Award for Best Inspirational Performance.	
Noël – Noël	1983	Decca Records	Charles Dutoit leads Price and the Montreal Symphony Orchestra in this album of Christmas music using arrangements by Arthur Harris. The recording was nominated for the Grammy Award for Best Inspirational Performance.	

== Selected compilation albums and collections ==
Title	Year	Label	Notes	References
Leontyne Price – Verdi Heroines	1970	RCA Victor Red Seal	A compilation album of opera arias by Giuseppe Verdi. Many of these were taken from earlier recordings released by RCA; including complete opera recordings.	
Heavy Hits Of Hope, Joy & Peace (Jesus Loves You)	1971	RCA Victor Red Seal	A compilation album featuring spiritual music performed by Price, the Robert Shaw Chorale, the Norman Luboff Choir, and conductors Leopold Stokowski and Robert Shaw.	
Leontyne Price: A Prima Donna Collection	1983	RCA Victor Red Seal	A compilation album of prior RCA recordings of Price singing opera arias. Later released on CD in 1996.	
The Great Voice Of Leontyne Price	1983	London Records	A compilation album consisting of opera arias, concert music, and spirituals.	
Leontyne Price Sings Mozart	1992	RCA Victor Gold Seal / BMG	A compilation album of Price singing opera arias and concert music by Mozart. Includes music recorded from 1965–1977.	
Leontyne Price: The Prima Donna Collection	1992	RCA Victor Gold Seal / BMG	A compilation of the earlier four volumes of Leontyne Price, Prima Donna.	
Grandi Voci: Leontyne Price	1993	Decca Records	A compilation of recordings Price made for Decca.	
Leontyne Price Sings Barber	1994	RCA Victor Gold Seal	A compilation of recordings Price made with Samuel Barber in 1953 and 1968.	
The Essential Leontyne Price	1996	BMG Classics	Encompasses a total of eleven discs of music spanning the breadth of Price's recording career. It was released in honor of Price's 70th birthday.	
Leontyne Price Sings Spirituals	1997	RCA Victor Red Seal	A compilation of Price's two albums of spirituals.	
The Essential Leontyne Price: Spirituals, Hymns & Sacred Songs	1997	RCA/BMG Classics	A compilation of Price's recordings of sacred music.	
Leontyne Price – The Ultimate Collection	1999	RCA Victor Red Seal	A compilation of Price singing 28 opera arias across two CDs.	
Leontyne Price –Original Album Classics	2009	RCA Victor Red Seal/Sony Music	A collection of several of Price's albums.	
Leontyne Price – The Complete Collection Of Operatic Recital Albums	2011	RCA Victor Red Seal/Sony Classical	A collection of several of Price's albums which were remastered.	
Leontyne Price – The Complete Collection of Song and Spiritual Albums	2012	RCA Victor Red Seal/Sony Classical	Encompasses recordings of spirituals, lieder, songs, and concert vocal works made between 1954- 1991 across a 12 CD collection.	

== Complete opera recordings ==
=== Studio recordings ===
Title	Year	Conductor and Orchestra	Cast	Label	Notes	References
Mozart; Don Giovanni	1959	Erich Leinsdorf; Vienna Philharmonic Orchestra	Don Giovanni (Cesare Siepi); Donna Anna (Birgit Nilsson); Donna Elvira (Price); Don Ottavio (Cesare Valletti); Leporello (Fernando Corena); Zerlina (Eugenia Ratti); Masetto (Heinz Blankenburg)	Decca Records	Originally released in Europe by Decca in 1959. Released in the United States in 1960 by RCA Victor Red Seal.	
Verdi; Il trovatore	1959	Arturo Basile; Rome Opera orchestra and chorus	Manrico (Richard Tucker); Leonora (Price); Azucena (Rosalind Elias); Conte di Luna (Leonard Warren); Ferrando (Giorgio Tozzi)	RCA Victor Red Seal		
Verdi; Aida	1962	Georg Solti; Rome Opera orchestra and chorus	Aida (Price); Radamès (Jon Vickers); Amneris (Rita Gorr)	Decca Records/RCA Victor Red Seal	Winner of the 1963 Grammy Award for Best Opera Recording. This record was made through a collaboration between Decca and RCA. It used Decca's new recording technology, a Decca producer, and conductor Solti who was a Decca signed artist. However, the vocalists were all contracted under RCA. Depending on the market, the album may have been sold with the RCA Victor label or a Decca label.	
Puccini; Tosca	1962	Herbert von Karajan; Vienna Philharmonic; Vienna State Opera chorus	Tosca (Price); Cavaradossi (Giuseppe Di Stefano); Scarpia (Giuseppe Taddei)	Decca Records/ RCA Red Seal Records	Nominated for the 1964 Grammy Award for Best Opera Recording.	
Puccini; Madama Butterfly	1962	Erich Leinsdorf; RCA Italiana Opera orchestra and chorus	Cio-Cio-San (Price); Pinkerton (Richard Tucker); Sharpless (Philip Maero); Suzuki (Rosalind Elias)	RCA Victor Red Seal	Winner of the 1964 Grammy Award for Best Opera Recording. Also nominated for the Grammy Award for Classical Album of the Year.	
Bizet; Carmen	1964	Herbert von Karajan; Vienna Philharmonic; Vienna State Opera chorus	Carmen (Price); Don José (Franco Corelli); Micaëla (Mirella Freni); Escamillo (Robert Merrill)	RCA Victor Red Seal	Winner of the 1965 Grammy Award for Best Opera Recording.	
Verdi; La forza del destino	1964	Thomas Schippers; RCA Italiana Orchestra & chorus	Leonora (Price); Alvaro (Richard Tucker); Carlo (Robert Merrill); Preziosilla (Shirley Verrett); Fra Melitone (Ezio Flagello); Padre Guardiano (Giorgio Tozzi)	RCA Red Seal Records	It was nominated for the Grammy Award for Best Opera Recording.	
Verdi; Un ballo in maschera	1966	Erich Leinsdorf; RCA Italiana Opera orchestra and chorus	Riccardo (Carlo Bergonzi); Amelia (Price); Renato (Robert Merrill); Oscar (Reri Grist); Ulrica (Shirley Verrett)	RCA Victor Red Seal		
Mozart; Così fan tutte	1967	Erich Leinsdorf; Philharmonia Orchestra; Ambrosian Singers	Fiordiligi (Price); Dorabella (Tatiana Troyanos); Despina (Judith Raskin); Ferrando (George Shirley); Guglielmo (Sherrill Milnes); Alfonso (Ezio Flagello)	RCA Red Seal	Winner of the 1969 Grammy Award for Best Opera Recording.	
Verdi; Ernani	1967	Thomas Schippers, RCA Italiana Opera orchestra and chorus	Ernani (Carlo Bergonzi); Elvira (Price); Don Carlo (Mario Sereni); Silva (Ezio Flagello)	RCA Red Seal Records		
Verdi; Il trovatore	1969	Zubin Mehta; Philharmonia Orchestra; Ambrosian Singers	Manrico (Plácido Domingo); Leonora (Price); Azucena (Fiorenza Cossotto); Conte di Luna (Sherrill Milnes); Ferrando (Bonaldo Giaiotti)	RCA Red Seal Records	Nominated for the Grammy Award for Best Opera Recording.	
Verdi; Aida	1970	Erich Leinsdorf; London Symphony Orchestra; John Alldis choir	Aida (Price); Radamès (Plácido Domingo); Amneris (Grace Bumbry); Amonasro (Sherrill Milnes); Ramfis (Ruggero Raimondi)	RCA Red Seal Records	Winner of the 1972 Grammy Award for Best Opera Recording.	
Puccini; Il tabarro	1971	Erich Leinsdorf; New Philharmonia Orchestra	Michele (Sherrill Milnes); Giorgetta (Price); Luigi (Plácido Domingo)	RCA Red Seal Records	Nominated for the Grammy Award for Best Opera Recording.	
Puccini; Tosca	1972	Zubin Mehta; Philharmonia Orchestra; John Alldis Choir; Wandsworth School Boys' Choir	Tosca (Price); Cavaradossi (Plácido Domingo); Scarpia (Sherrill Milnes)	RCA Red Seal Records		
Verdi; La forza del destino	1976	James Levine; London Symphony Orchestra; John Alldis Choir	Leonora (Price); Alvaro (Plácido Domingo); Carlo (Sherrill Milnes); Preziosilla (Fiorenza Cossotto); Fra Melitone (Gabriel Bacquier); Padre Guardiano (Bonaldo Giaiotti)	RCA Red Seal Records		
Verdi; Il trovatore	1977	Herbert von Karajan; Berlin Philharmonic; Deutsche Oper Berlin chorus	Manrico (Franco Bonisolli); Leonora (Price); Azucena (Elena Obraztsova); Conte di Luna (Piero Cappuccilli); Ferrando (Ruggero Raimondi)	EMI Classics		
R. Strauss; Ariadne auf Naxos	1977	Georg Solti; London Philharmonic Orchestra	Ariadne (Price); Bacchus (René Kollo); Composer (Tatiana Troyanos); Zerbinetta (Edita Gruberova); Music Master (Walter Berry)	Decca Records		

=== Selected live recordings ===
Title	Year	Conductor and Orchestra	Cast	Label	Notes	References
Puccini; Tosca	1955	Peter Hermann Adler; NBC Symphony Orchestra	Tosca (Price); Cavaradossi (David Poleri); Scarpia (Josh Wheeler)	Legato Classics 1998	Excerpts from Price's historic grand opera debut with the NBC Opera Theatre on January 23, 1955 Also found on discs by House of Opera and Premiere Opera.	
Mozart; Don Giovanni	1960	Karajan; Vienna Philharmonic; Chorus of the Vienna State Opera	Don Giovanni (Eberhard Wächter); Donna Anna (Price); Donna Elvira (Elisabeth Schwarzkopf); Don Ottavio (Cesare Valletti); Leporello (Walter Berry); Zerlina (Graziella Sciutti); Masetto (Rolando Panerai)	Myto Records	Recorded live at the Salzburg Festival.	
Puccini; Madama Butterfly	1961	Kurt Herbert Adler; San Francisco Opera orchestra and chorus	Cio-Cio-San (Price); Pinkerton (Sándor Kónya); Sharpless (Vladimir Ruždjak); Suzuki (Mildred Miller)	House of Opera	Recorded live at the San Francisco Opera House on September 22, 1961	
Puccini; Turandot	1961	Karajan; Vienna Philharmonic; Chorus of the Vienna State Opera	Turandot (Birgit Nilsson); Calaf (Giuseppe di Stefano); Liù (Price); Timur (Nicola Zaccaria)	First released by HRE in 1984	Recorded live on June 22, 1961	
Verdi; Il trovatore	1961	Fausto Cleva; Metropolitan Opera orchestra and chorus	Manrico (Franco Corelli), Leonora (Price); Azucena (Irene Dalis); Conte di Luna (Mario Sereni); Ferrando (William Wildermann)	Myto Records	Recorded live at the Metropolitan Opera House on February 4, 1961.	
Puccini; Tosca	1962	Kurt Adler; Metropolitan Opera orchestra and chorus	Tosca (Price); Cavaradossi (Franco Corelli); Scarpia (Cornell MacNeil)	Sony Records	Recorded live on April 2, 1962	
Verdi; Il trovatore	1962	Karajan; Vienna Philharmonic; Vienna State Opera chorus	Manrico (Franco Corelli), Leonora (Price); Azucena (Giulietta Simionato); Conte di Luna (Ettore Bastianini); Ferrando (Nicola Zaccaria)	Deutsche Grammophon	Recorded live at the Salzburg Festival on July 31, 1962.	
Verdi; Ernani	1962	Thomas Schippers; Metropolitan Opera orchestra and chorus	Ernani (Carlo Bergonzi); Elvira (Price); Don Carlo (Cornell MacNeil); Silva (Giorgio Tozzi)	Sony Records	Recorded live on December 1, 1962	
Verdi; Aida	1963	Lovro von Matačić; Vienna State Opera orchestra and chorus	Aida (Price); Radamès (Dimiter Uzunov); Amneris (Giulietta Simionato); Amonasro (Ettore Bastianini); Ramfis (Walter Kreppel)	Electrecord	Recorded live on June 3, 1963	
Puccini; Il tabarro	1971	Nino Sanzogno; San Francisco Opera orchestra and chorus	Michele (Gabriel Bacquier); Giorgetta (Price); Luigi (Aldo Bottion)	House of Opera	Recorded live at the San Francisco Opera House on November 26, 1971. This was Price's first performance of this role.	
Puccini; Manon Lescaut	1974	Reynald Giovaninetti; San Francisco Opera orchestra and chorus	Manon (Price); Des Grieux (Giorgio Merighi); Lescaut (Julian Patrick)	House of Opera	Recorded live on September 9, 1974	
Verdi; La forza del destino	1979	Kurt Herbert Adler; San Francisco Opera orchestra & chorus	Leonora (Price); Alvaro (Veriano Luchetti); Carlo (Guillermo Sarabia); Preziosilla (Judith Forst); Fra Melitone (Giuseppe Taddei); Padre Guardiano (Martti Talvela); David Cumberland (Marchese di Calatrava); Curra (Gwendolyn Jones)	Reel Tape	Recorded live November 9, 1979	
Verdi; La forza del destino	1984	James Levine; Metropolitan Opera orchestra & chorus	Leonora (Price); Alvaro (Giuseppe Giacomini); Carlo (Leo Nucci); Preziosilla (Isola Jones); Fra Melitone (Enrico Fissore); Padre Guardiano (Bonaldo Giaiotti)	SD video: Met Opera on Demand	Recorded live on March 24, 1984	

== Choral and symphonic ==
Title	Year	Genre	Musicians	Label	Notes	References
The Ninth Symphony of Beethoven and Symphony No. 8	1959	choral symphony	Boston Symphony Orchestra; Chorus of the New England Conservatory; Charles Munch; Price; Maureen Forrester; David Poleri; Giorgio Tozzi	RCA Victor Red Seal	Recorded in December 1958, Price and the other singers were only heard in Symphony No. 9	
Verdi Requiem	1960	Requiem (funeral mass)	Vienna Philharmonic; Choral Society of the Friends of Music, Vienna; Fritz Reiner; Price; Rosalind Elias; Jussi Björling; Giorgio Tozzi	RCA Victor Red Seal		
El Amor Brujo / Les Nuits D'Été	1964	ballet / song cycle	Chicago Symphony Orchestra; Fritz Reiner	RCA Victor	This recording won the 1965 Grammy Award for Best Vocal Soloist Performance (with or without orchestra).	
Verdi Requiem	1977	Requiem	Chicago Symphony Orchestra; Chicago Symphony Choir; Georg Solti; Margaret Hillis (chorus master); Price; Janet Baker; Veriano Luchetti; José van Dam	RCA Victor Red Seal		
Missa solemnis	1981 (recorded 1959)	solemn mass	Vienna Philharmonic; Choral Society of the Friends of Music, Vienna; Herbert von Karajan; Price; Christa Ludwig; Nicolai Gedda; Nicola Zaccaria	Melodram	Ludwig van Beethoven's Missa solemnis was recorded live at the Salzburg Festival on August 19, 1959. It was not released on disc until 1981.	
Live Recordings of Outstanding Musicians: G. Verdi Requiem	1984	Requiem	La Scala Chorus and Orchestra; Herbert von Karajan; Price; Fiorenza Cossotto; Carlo Bergonzi; Nicolai Ghiaurov	Melodiya	Verdi's Requiem was recorded live at the Bolshoi Theater, Moscow on September 23, 1964. It was later released on disc in Russia in 1984.	
Verdi Requiem	200	Requiem	Orchestra and Chorus of La Scala, Milan; Herbert von Karajan; Price; Fiorenza Cossotto; Luciano Pavarotti; Nicolai Ghiaurov	Deutsche Grammophon	Film of 1967 La Scala performance directed by Henri-Georges Clouzot. Only officially released in 2001 on DVD.	

== Selected live concert recordings ==
Title	Year	Label	Notes	References
Leontyne Price at the Met	1976	Metropolitan Opera Guild	An album of recordings made live at the Metropolitan Opera. Included are ten opera arias from ten different roles Price sang on the Met stage.	
Leontyne Price & Marilyn Horne in Concert at the Met	1983	RCA Victor Red Seal	James Levine conducts the Metropolitan Opera Orchestra in this live album of opera duets and arias sung by Price and Marilyn Horne at the Metropolitan Opera House. The recording won the 1984 Grammy Award for Best Classical Vocal Soloist Performance.	
Leontyne Price Live! (At The Historic Opening Of The Ordway Music Theatre)	1985	Pro Arte	Pianist David Garvey accompanies Price in a live concert on January 1, 1985 that was given as the grand opening of the Ordway Center for the Performing Arts.	
A Salute to American Music	1992	RCA Victor Red Seal	Price is one of many performers on this recording of a live concert at Avery Fisher Hall given on November 10, 1991. Price performed "America the Beautiful" and also introduced many of the songs and arias throughout the concert. In addition to being recorded for CD, it was also filmed for television broadcast on PBS.	
Leontyne Price Rediscovered	2002	RCA Victor Red Seal / BMG	Live recording of Price's recital at Carnegie Hall on February 28, 1965.	
Leontyne Price & Samuel Barber: Historic Performances 1938 & 1953	2004	Bridge Records, Inc.	Live recordings of Price and Barber performing in recital together. The first concert is of the world premiere of Barber's Hermit Songs performed on October 30, 1953, at the Coolidge Auditorium, Library of Congress, Washington, D.C. The second is a concert recorded on December 26, 1938, at Casimir Hall at the Curtis Institute of Music, Philadelphia, Pennsylvania.	
