= Leontyne Price =

American soprano (born 1927)

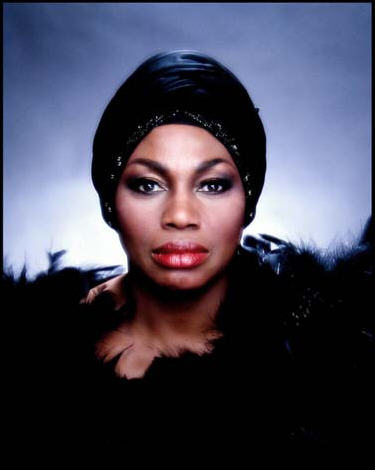
- Price in 1981
- Born: Mary Violet Leontine Price; February 10, 1927 (age 99); Laurel, Mississippi, U.S.
- Education: Central State University (BA); Juilliard School
- Occupations: Opera and concert soprano
- Years active: 1947–1997
- Organizations: Metropolitan Opera
- Known for: Operas of Verdi, particularly Aida
- Spouse: William Warfield
- Awards: Presidential Medal of Freedom; Spingarn Medal; National Medal of Arts; Kennedy Center Honors; Academy of Achievement

Leontyne Price (/ˈliːəntiːn, liˈɒntiːn/ LEE-ən-teen, lee-ON-teen; born Mary Violet Leontine Price, February 10, 1927) is an American singer who was the first African-American soprano to receive international acclaim. From 1961 she began a long association with the Metropolitan Opera, becoming the first Black singer to maintain a sustained relationship with the company. She regularly appeared at the world's major opera houses, including the Vienna State Opera, the Royal Opera House, San Francisco Opera, Lyric Opera of Chicago, and La Scala. She was particularly renowned for her performances of the title role in Giuseppe Verdi's Aida.

Born in Laurel, Mississippi, Price studied at Wilberforce University and the Juilliard School with Florence Kimball. Price's first significant professional engagement was in Virgil Thomson's Four Saints in Three Acts which she performed both on Broadway and in Paris. Later that same year she starred in the third revival of George Gershwin's Porgy and Bess, and would marry her co-star, bass-baritone William Warfield. She began a long association with composer Samuel Barber in 1953 when she performed the world premiere of his Hermit Songs with the composer as her accompanist at the Library of Congress.

In 1955 Price became the first African American to star in a televised opera when she portrayed the title role in Puccini's Tosca with the NBC Opera Theatre. This event was widely viewed as a significant moment in breaking the color barrier for black opera singers who were historically barred from appearing on the opera stage. This televised performance, along with appearances at the San Francisco Opera as Poulenc's Dialogues des Carmélites and Aida, brought her to international attention. She went on to sing at many of the world's major opera houses with Aida, before her successful debut at the Metropolitan Opera (Met) in 1961, as Leonora in Verdi's Il trovatore. Continuing her career there, she starred in a multitude of operas for 20 years, securing her place among the leading performers of the century. One of these works was Barber's Antony and Cleopatra, which she starred in for its world premiere. She made her farewell opera performance at the Met in 1985 in Aida.

In interviews, Price referred to her own voice as that of a lyric soprano, although scholars have variously described her as a dramatic or spinto soprano instead. (Note: In interviews, Price referred to her own voice as that of a lyric soprano. However, critical assessment of her voice has not uniformly agreed. Some writers have referred to her as a lyric soprano and others as a dramatic soprano. Still others have designated her voice as a spinto or "lirico spinto" (Italian for "pushed lyric") soprano, a type of voice that inhabits the space in-between a lyric and dramatic soprano. The designation of Price's voice as a spinto soprano has also been embraced by academics in the field of vocal pedagogy, with several books discussing voice classification using Price's voice as the prime example of the spinto soprano voice type.) Price's musical interpretations were subtle and often overshadowed her acting. She was noted for her roles in operas by Mozart and Puccini, as well as playing Cleopatra in Handel's Giulio Cesare and Poppea in Monteverdi's L'incoronazione di Poppea. However, the "middle period" operas of Verdi remain her greatest triumph: Aida, the Leonoras of Il trovatore and La forza del destino, as well as Amelia in Un ballo in maschera. Her performances in these works, as well as Mozart and Puccini's operas, survive in her many recordings.

After her retirement from opera, Price continued to appear in recitals and orchestral concerts until 1998. After that, she would come out of retirement to sing at special events, including a memorial concert at Carnegie Hall, in 2001 for victims of the 9/11 terrorist attacks. Among her many honors and awards are the Presidential Medal of Freedom in 1964, in addition to her 13 Grammy Awards.

== Life and career ==
=== Early life and family ===
Leontyne Price singing (photo with dedication)

Mary Violet Leontine (Note: Leontine was the spelling used at Price's birth and during her growing up years. As a young adult, she altered the spelling to Leontyne while attending Wilberforce University.) Price was born in Laurel, Mississippi, on February 10, 1927. Her parents gave her the middle name Leontine after the name Leon, a name chosen by her parents to honor her father's best friend whose name was Leon. Her mother proposed this feminized version of the name. Her brother and only sibling, George, was born in 1929. He grew up to become a brigadier general in the United States Army, and lived until 2024 when he died at the age of 95.

Price's father, James Anthony Price, worked in the timber industry and was employed in the sawmills in Laurel. He also worked as a part-time carpenter. Her mother, Katherine Viola Price (née Baker), was a licensed practical nurse and midwife who delivered hundreds of babies in Laurel and the surrounding region. Her parents were both deeply religious, and her grandparents on both sides of the family were Methodist ministers.

Singer Dionne Warwick has said that she is a cousin of Price on her maternal side.

When Price was born during racial segregation in the United States that impacted her childhood, and the enforcement of Jim Crow laws was a reality of everyday life in Mississippi. At that time black Americans were unable to share spaces like schools, churches, restaurants, restrooms, and theaters with white Americans. She lived with her family in the south side of Laurel which was where all of the town's black residents lived. The Price family home was situated in the middle class section of Laurel's black community. She attended all-black schools throughout her childhood; including Sandy Gavin Elementary School. The family's church, Saint Paul's Methodist Church, was an all-black church. Her mother was a talented amateur singer who sang as a soloist in Saint Paul's church choir, and Leontyne grew up singing alongside her mother in this choral group. Her father played a tuba in the church band.

=== Childhood education and early music experiences ===
Price showed a natural affinity for music at an early age and began piano lessons at the age of three and a half with the local pianist Hattie McInnis. McInnis was one of the few African American music teachers that had studied under composer Carl Orff; a man known for developing the Orff Schulwerk approach to music education. Initially, she played on a toy piano, but by the time she was five, her parents traded in the family phonograph as the down payment on an upright piano. She studied with McInnis for more than twelve years; taking both piano and voice lessons with her. Her piano skills were further honed at Saint Paul's Methodist Church where she played regularly for Sunday school and at church services.

Leontyne's aunt, Evelina Greer, lived with her family and was employed as a maid in the home of Alexander and Elizabeth Chisholm; a wealthy white family living in the north part of Laurel. Elizabeth Chisholm (née Wisner) was the daughter of a wealthy lumber magnate, and Greer had worked for the Wisner family prior to her marriage to Alexander Chisholm, a successful banker. In a 1955 interview, Elizabeth Chisholm said that Greer had taken care of her when she was a little girl and had worked for her family for forty-five years. From an early age, Leontyne and her brother would often accompany their aunt when she went to work at the Chisholm home. The Chisholm family had children of about the same age as Leontyne and her brother, and the Price and Chisholm children became close friends. In particular, Leontyne and George were close with the Chisholms' older daughters, Jean and Margaret Ann (aka Peggy), and Leontyne referred to herself as their "chocolate sister". Their parents also became friends with the Chisholms, and the Prices considered the Chisholms their "other family". Price maintained a friendship with Peggy Chisholm, with Price describing her as her best friend in a 1981 interview. Peggy died in New York in 1991.

Mrs. Chisholm was a trained pianist, and encouraged Leontyne's piano-playing and singing, often inviting her to sing at house parties. The Chisholm family gave Leontyne access to their phonograph and record collection which is how she experienced listening to opera for the first time. Aged nine, she was taken on a school trip to hear Marian Anderson sing a recital in Jackson. The experience was her first significant exposure to live classical music, and she later recalled: "The whole aura of the occasion had a tremendous effect on me, particularly the singer's dignity and, of course, her voice." Multiple commentators asserted that this event galvanized Price's interest in a musical career.

As a teenager, Price attended Oak Park Vocational High School (OPVHS) where she graduated in 1944 as salutatorian of her class. At OPVHS she was a cheerleader and a drum majorette in the school's band. She also sang in school choral groups, played piano for the school choir, and performed as a soloist at school events. During her high school years she earned extra money by singing for funerals and civic functions, and was a popular performer at civic and church events within Laurel's black community. She gave her first solo recital at Sandy Gavin School Auditorium on December 17, 1943 during which she sang and played classical piano music.

=== College of Education and Industrial Arts at Wilberforce University ===
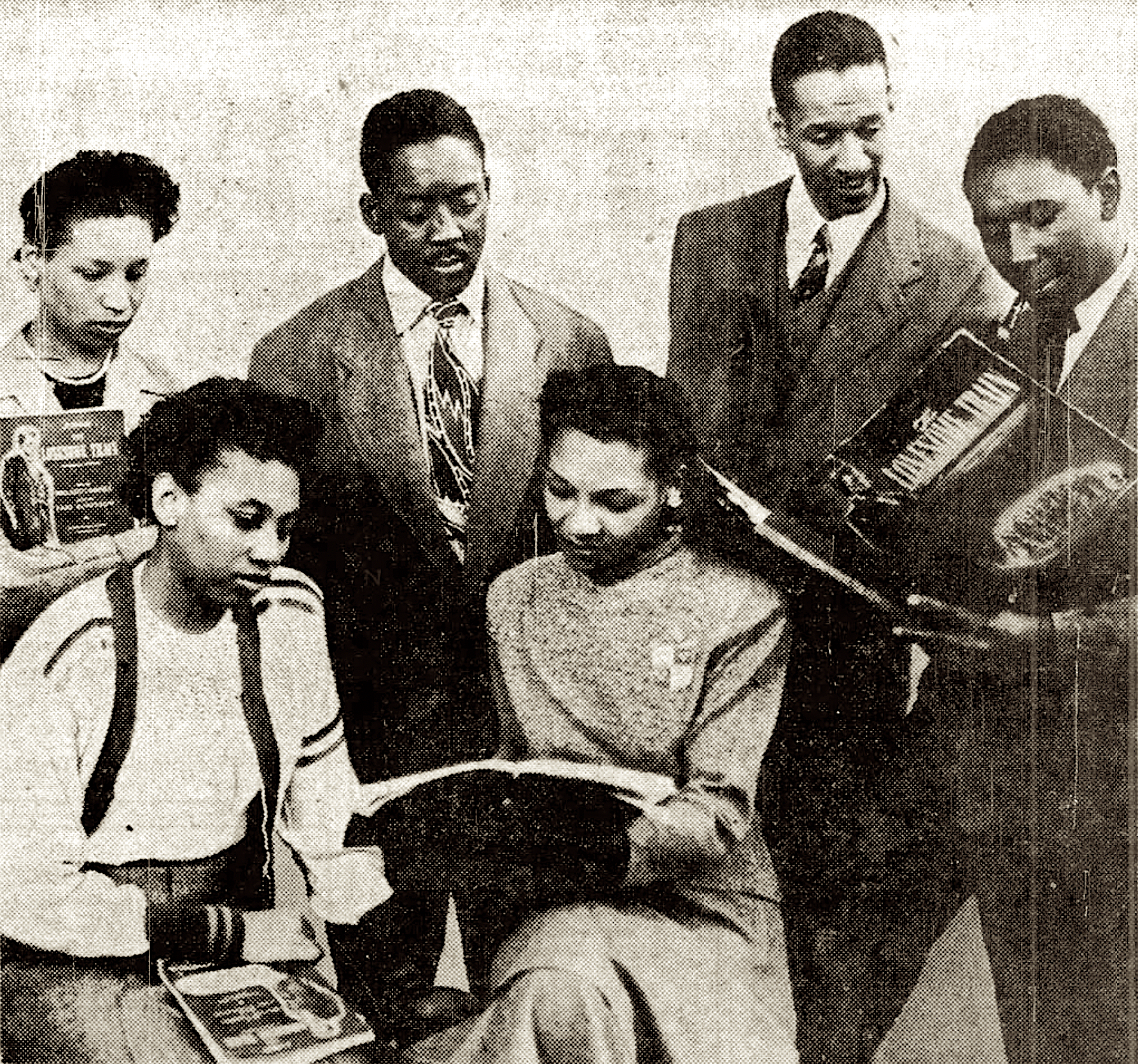
Leontyne Price (seated bottom left) rehearses Millard Lampell's ballad opera The Lonesome Train at the State College of Education and Industrial Arts in 1948. Seated next to her is her professor Beatrice O'Rourke who is the director of this ensemble.

Price received her undergraduate education in Wilberforce, Ohio at the College of Education and Industrial Arts where she began her studies in the Fall 1944 semester at the age of 17. At that time, the school operated as a department inside Wilberforce University, a historically Black institution. Some sources erroneously claim that she enrolled at Central State University in 1944, but that institution did not formally exist until 1947 and was not known as Central State University until 1951. (Note: Wilberforce University had an unusual operational structure with two governing boards overseeing the school. One board was appointed by the state government of Ohio which oversaw the College of Education and Industrial Arts and the other was appointed by the African Methodist Episcopal Church which oversaw the College of Liberal Arts. Both halves of the school co-existed as a single institution under the umbrella of Wilberforce University in a formal partnership between church and state with a single president over the entire institution. Charles H. Wesley was Wilberforce University's president from 1942 until June 1947 when in-fighting led the state and church partnership to end. The schools formally separated into two institutions with the church backed College of Liberal Arts remaining as Wilberforce University and the state backed school becoming the State College of Education and Industrial Arts at Wilberforce (now known as Central State University) beginning in the 1947/1948 academic year.)

Price attended Wilberforce University on a full four year scholarship. She changed the spelling of her name to Leontyne while she was studying at Wilberforce. In June 1947, the summer before Price's senior year, the College of Education and Industrial Arts broke away from Wilberforce University to become its own separate institution known as the State College of Education and Industrial Arts at Wilberforce (now known as Central State University). Price graduated from the State College of Education and Industrial Arts at Wilberforce on June 3, 1948.

Price enrolled in Wilberforce University as a music education major where her primary instrument was initially the piano. Multiple sources claim that she changed her major to vocal performance; however Price stated in a 1981 interview that her Bachelor degree was in music education as her family felt she needed a backup in case performance didn't work out. She did however, change her focus of study to voice, and her vocal training at Wilberforce was as a mezzo-soprano at this institution. The decision to make this shift was done after she filled in for a sick singer in a glee club concert in her sophomore year to which she received much positive feedback. Prior to this she had only performed in ensembles at Wilberforce as an accompanist and had never sung at the university. Price stated in a 1981 interview that this moment was the "discovery of her voice". Wilberforce president Charles H. Wesley, along with several of her music professors and classmates convinced her to change her focus to vocal music with Price stating she made this change in her sophomore year.

In her junior year at the school Price determined that she should attempt to pursue a singing career. Price credited a visiting pianist to Wilberforce with influencing her decision to abandon a teaching vocation for a singing career. That individual also convinced her that she was a soprano after she had the opportunity to perform and rehearse with the pianist. Some reference works state that Price studied singing with Catherine Van Buren at Wilberforce. However, newspapers covering vocal competitions she won while a student, state that she was a voice student of Clarice Estell at the university.

At Wilberforce, Price was a member of the Delta Sigma Theta sorority. She sang and toured in the Wilberforce Singers at the same time that the ensemble's membership included opera singer Betty Allen who was also Price's roommate at Wilberforce. She was also a member of the Wilberforce Women's Glee Club under directors Flora Isabel Askew and Marie Ware. In 1946 she was the soloist in Théodore Dubois's Les Sept paroles du Christ (The Seven Last Words of Christ) with the Wilberforce University Choir conducted by Charles Henri Woode. I

In December 1947 Price was one of the soloists in George Frideric Handel's Messiah in a joint presentation of the oratorio by the choirs of Wilberforce and Antioch College which was conducted by Antioch music professor Walter Franklin Anderson (1915-2003). In a 1981 interview with Opera News editor Robert M. Jacobsen, Price recalled the irony that she, who became a famous soprano, was the contralto soloist in this production while Allen, who became a famous mezzo-soprano, was the soprano soloist in the oratorio. In 1948 she starred in Wilberforce's production of Millard Lampell's ballad opera The Lonesome Train which they toured to Delaware for performances at a folk festival held on the campus of Wilmington College.

In Spring 1947, while a junior in the music department at Wilberforce, Price won first prize in the Alpha Phi Alpha fraternity inter-collegiate music competition held on the campus of the University of Cincinnati. Her repertoire at this competition included the soprano aria "Vissi d'arte" from Tosca. Later in the year, while a senior at the school, she placed third in the American Music Festival competition in Chicago which was sponsored by The Chicago Defender. She, and the competition's other two winners, performed in concert at Comiskey Park, home of the Chicago White Sox, as part of the festival on July 25, 1947 in front of a crowd of 20,000 people. At this time she was billed as a mezzo-soprano.

=== Juilliard School and other training ===
==== Paying for Juilliard: A community rallies ====
Price decided she wanted to pursue further studies in singing at the Juilliard School while an undergraduate student in Wilberforce. She was prompted to do so by Mrs. Anna M. Terry, then head of Wilberforce's music department, who advised Price to apply and obtained an application form to Juilliard for her. She did and was accepted. Administrators at the State College of Education and Industrial Arts wanted to support Price financially in this endeavor, and a Leontyne Price Fund was formally organized by the school to help provide funds towards this goal. The renowned bass Paul Robeson was an important early supporter of Price who lent his talents to help raise money for this fund, and together Robeson and Price sang in a 1948 benefit concert which raised $1,000.00 for her Juilliard education. Robeson first became aware of Price after hearing her sing while visiting Wilberforce in 1946. (Note: Some sources claim that Robeson first heard her perform at Antioch College, but Robeson's account differed in 1948 newspaper interviews which states he first became aware of her after hearing her perform at a Wilberforce concert on the Wilberforce campus. Price also stated in a 1981 interview that she first met Robeson in the home of Wilberforce president Charles H. Wesley which is when she first sang for him.) She later participated in master classes with Robeson at Antioch College.

While the benefit concert did raise money for Price's Juilliard tuition, it was nowhere close to the funds she needed to attend the school. Price's parents were not able to support her financially because they were paying for her brother's undergraduate education which was just beginning, and were not able to afford both tuitions simultaneously. The Chisholm family remained supportive of Price, and according to some sources they paid for the majority of her tuition while she was a graduate student at Juilliard after obtaining permission from Price's parents to do so. Other sources state that Price won a scholarship to Juilliard which paid for her tuition, but that the Chisholms paid for her living expenses such as rent and food, and for materials she needed for her studies. In a 1981 interview, Price stated that she was given a partial and not full time scholarship to Juilliard and that the Chisholms paid for the bulk of her expenses during her first three years at the institution.

The story of the Chisholm family's generosity was widely publicized in the press, to the point that some have criticized the news coverage of propagating a White savior narrative that overlooked the impact of Price's own agency, hard work, and talent had on her achievements. Critics in the Black community in Laurel have also pointed to the many African Americans in Laurel ranging from teachers, ministers, neighbors, members of black churches, and fellow black musicians among others who rallied behind her in a network of support.

Yet, the Chisholm family's support of Price was based in genuine friendship, with Margaret Ann Chisholm remaining one of Price's closest longterm friends. Price herself, expressed frustration with the news coverage of the Chisholm family's support with her pointed comments emphasizing that the coverage had overlooked the contributions that her own family had made towards her success, including taking out a mortgage on the family home. Price stated the following in a 1976 interview:

The Press has made too much of that legend. I love Miss Chisholm; she was here only last month. Her daughter Margaret Ann and I are best friends. But the Chisholms got exposure because of the racial angle. I guess it makes me angry because it denies the sacrifices my parents made for me.

In a 2012 interview, Price criticized the press coverage of her relationship with the Chisholms as being mischaracterized. She emphasized the importance of the absence of paternalism in her relationship with the Chisholm family, and described what one historian summarized as the "strangeness of real relationships between Blacks and whites in the American South in the first century after slavery." She also stressed in another interview that she herself contributed to her financial expenses; working multiple jobs while a student at Juilliard. One of these was working as a paid singer at various churches in Manhattan, including Riverside Church.

==== Juilliard School, Berkshire Music Center, and studies with Florence Kimball ====
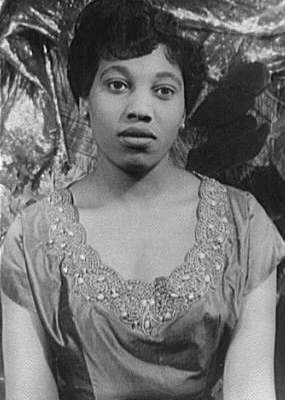
Price in 1951

Price attended Juilliard at a time when the institution was training a relatively large group of students that would go on to have successful opera and/or concert careers on the international stage. Several African-American singers of note were trained at the school while she was there, including Shirley Verrett, Martha Flowers and Leonora Lafayette. Some of her other classmates included sopranos Evelyn Lear, Bethany Beardslee, Gladys Kuchta, Evelyn Aring, Betty Wilson Long, Corinne Swall, Louise Natale, and Marianne Weltmann; contralto Florence Kopleff; countertenor Russell Oberlin; and tenor Charles Bressler to name just a few. Pianist David Garvey was also a student with Price at Juilliard, and he became her regular accompanist throughout her career.

Price began her studies at the Juilliard School in the fall of 1948 where she was a voice student of Florence Page Kimball. Kimball is credited with transforming Price's voice from a "heavy molasses mezzo" into a soprano, and Price indicated that she learned the vocal technique that sustained her career from Kimball. In Kimball's studio Price developed an affinity for the music of Verdi, Puccini, and Mozart. Much of their time together in her early voice lessons at Juilliard was spent mastering the title roles in Verdi's Aida and Ariadne auf Naxos by R. Strauss. The two women developed a close relationship with one of Price's close friends stating "Lee [Leontyne] used to go to Miss Kimball the way other people would go to a psychiatrist or a priest."

Price continued to study singing with Kimball long after she graduated from Juilliard. Together they prepared her roles for the Metropolitan Opera; with Kimball even helping her select her costumes and think through stage movements in addition to working on the music material. In a 1983 interview, Price stated of her association with Florence Kimball:

It was the most important relationship of my life. Like sex it was pure chemistry ... She told me there was an innate quality of dignity in my voice, and that you tend to move and look like you sound.

While studying at Juilliard, Price spent her first school year living in the Harlem YWCA, which was safe and affordable accommodation open to Black women. She later lived in the International House of New York where she also worked at the information desk while a Juilliard student. William Schuman was the president of the Juilliard School while Price was a student, and his tenure was marked by support of students performing newly composed music; an attitude markedly different from his predecessor. He also introduced and implemented a new pedagogy of teaching music theory at Juilliard during that period called "Literature and Materials". Price was introduced to composer Samuel Barber at Juilliard by Florence Kimball, and the two ultimately became frequent collaborators.

Price's interest in opera blossomed at Juilliard after attending performances of Puccini's Turandot by the New York City Opera and Salome by R. Strauss at the Metropolitan Opera. She attended the latter opera in the standing room only section of the Met during her second year of study at the school. The performance by Ljuba Welitsch in the title role solidified a strong interest in the art form within Price. In the fall of 1950 she became a member of the Juilliard Opera Workshop which was directed by Frederic Cohen. In Cohen's "Introduction to Opera" course she studied and performed "Dido's Lament" from Purcell's Dido and Aeneas, and Cohen reportedly said to his wife "we have the voice of the century" after hearing her perform the aria. Cohen's wife, Elsa Kahl, taught stage movement to the students in Juilliard's opera program.

Price initially performed small roles in Juilliard Opera Workshop (also known as the Juilliard Opera Theatre) performances of Mozart's The Magic Flute (First Lady) and Puccini's Gianni Schicchi (Nella). In the summer of 1951, she enrolled in the opera program at the Berkshire Music Center (BMC) at Tanglewood. At the 1951 Tanglewood Music Festival (then known as the Berkshire Music Festival) she performed the role of Ariadne in a pre-professional production of Ariadne auf Naxos (second cast) under conductor Sarah Caldwell in a production directed by Boris Goldovsky. In July 1951 she was heard at the festival singing the "Quia respexit" from Bach's Magnificat under conductor Eleazar de Carvalho. She was also heard in August 1951 concerts at Tanglewood performing lieder by Hugo Wolf and excerpts from Aida. She returned to the BMC in 1954 to perform the title role in a pre-professional production of Salome. She also was the soprano soloist in Beethoven's Symphony No. 9 with the Boston Symphony Orchestra under Charles Munch at Tanglewood; with Price stating it was one of her earliest performances of the symphony which ultimately became a "calling card" for her with orchestras around the world.

In 1952 Price sang the larger role of Mistress Ford in the Juilliard Opera Theatre production of Verdi's Falstaff under the baton of Frederic Waldman. Others in the cast included bass-baritone Orville White in the title role, Stephen Harbachick as Ford, Rosemary Carlos as Anne, and the well-known New York City cantor Lawrence Avery as Bardolph. This production garnered excellent reviews in the New York press with Douglas Watt of the New York Daily News writing, "Mary Leontyne Price, as Mistress Ford, revealed the makings of an impressive dramatic soprano and gave a good acting performance, as well." Howard Taubman in The New York Times was also complimentary, stating "Miss Price has a rich, well-placed dramatic voice, and she knows how to use it."

Price was awarded a Fulbright Scholarship during her final year at Juilliard, and initially planned on studying in Europe with these scholarship funds after completing her Juilliard studies in the spring of 1952. However, performance opportunities changed her plans, and she abandoned her fellowship.

=== Early career ===
==== Four Saints in Three Acts and Porgy and Bess ====
===== Casting in Porgy and Bess and Four Saints in Three Acts =====
Price's performance in the 1952 Juilliard production of Falstaff drew positive attention not only from critics, but also producers who were in the midst of casting up-coming productions. Producers Blevins Davis and Robert Breen watched a performance and decided to cast Price in the role of Bess in their up-coming revival of George Gershwin's Porgy and Bess. Some sources also claim that composer Virgil Thomson saw Price perform in Falstaff and based on this cast her in the 1952 Broadway revival of his all-black cast opera, Four Saints in Three Acts, which featured a libretto by Gertrude Stein. However, letters between composers Nicolas Nabokov and Thomson draw into question the truthfulness of this narrative in regards to the latter opera.

Nabokov was director of the 1952 Paris music festival "Masterpieces of the 20th Century" which was presented under the auspices of the Congress for Cultural Freedom. An August 1951 conversation between Nabokov and Thomson led to the planning of a revival of Four Saints in Three Acts at this Paris music festival with Nabokov and Thomson selecting the creative team behind the revival in consultation with one another. The decision was made to put the production together in New York with a limited engagement there before taking it to France.

Its unclear how Nabokov first became aware of Price, but in three separate letters to Thomson he made pleas for the composer to cast Price in the opera. In one of these letters, he mentions that Price sings better than what she did in an audition for Thomson which indicates that the composer had hesitations about casting Price. Nabokov also made financial arguments in these pleas, going so far as to secure a scholarship for Price to study at the Fontainebleau School in Paris so that they would not have to pay for her board in France, and mentioning that patrons in Mississippi had agreed to pay for her travel expenses to and from Paris. Ultimately Nabokov succeeded in winning over Thomson, and Price made her professional stage debut in Four Saints in Three Acts in 1952 while she was still a Juilliard student. In March 1952 The Afro-American reported that Mr. and Mrs. Chisholm were the benefactors supporting Price on her trip to France, and that she would be studying at Fontainebleau while in Paris after her final year of studies at Juilliard.

===== Professional debut in Four Saints in Three Acts, Porgy and Bess tour, and Price's marriage to Warfield =====
Four Saints in Three Acts opened in New York at the Broadway Theatre on 53rd Street on April 16, 1952 with Price in the role of Saint Cecelia. Some sources, but not all, consider it her professional opera debut. (Note: There is little agreement on Price's opera debut in the literature. Some sources date it to the 1952 Juilliard production of Falstaff as it was the first opera performance for which she received significant attention. Some sources dismiss this as it was a student production. Other sources date Price's opera debut to Four Saints in Three Acts. Some sources call this her "professional debut" or simply "debut" but name a different performance as her "opera debut"; possibly because the production was staged on Broadway and not in an opera house or by an established opera company. It's also possible that Thomson and Stein's work, which challenged opera norms, may not have been viewed as an opera by certain writers with particular biases. One writer on her career called the work an "operatic whatsit". Likewise, the 1952/1953 production of Porgy and Bess which toured internationally, including on Broadway, may not have been seen as an opera debut because it was not attached to an established opera house, and the work itself was viewed more as a musical rather than an opera at the time of the production; an opinion which did not shift until the work became an accepted part of the opera repertory years later. Some sources have also named Price's January 23, 1955 NBC Opera Theatre television broadcast as Tosca as her debut; possibly because it was her first performance with an established opera company, even if it was a television opera company. Still others date her opera debut to much later in 1957 when she appeared in the United States premiere of Francis Poulenc's Les Dialogues des Carmélites at the San Francisco Opera; possibly in acknowledgement that this was her first appearance with an established opera company as opposed to a Broadway or touring production not attached to an opera company.) Price became a member of the Actors' Equity Association at the time that she was cast in this show. After two weeks running on Broadway, the production of Saints went to Paris, marking Price's first professional engagement on the international stage. In the midst of the show's run she succeeded Inez Matthews in the larger role of St Teresa I. She returned to the United States in early June 1952 to quickly join Davis and Breen's revival of Porgy and Bess which opened in Dallas at the State Fair of Texas on June 9, 1952. Price arrived very late in the rehearsal process due to her obligations in Paris, and only was able to attend two rehearsals before performing the part on this opening date with conductor Alexander Smallens leading the musical forces.

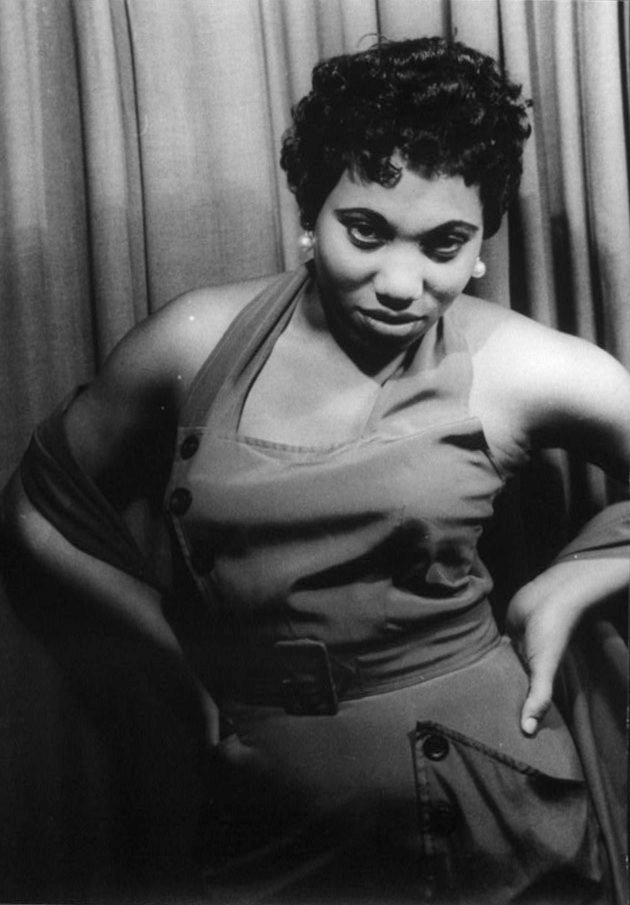
Price in Porgy and Bess in 1953

Davis and Breen structured the Porgy and Bess tour purposefully to challenge segregation in the American South by refusing to allow their performances to be played before segregated audiences. However, cast members did experience challenges on the southern portion of the tour; with some being denied hotel rooms or the ability to eat in restaurants due to racial segregation. Price toured in Porgy and Bess for two years with her and Urylee Leonardos alternating performances in the role of Bess. The production was given the backing of the U.S. State Department which supported an international tour of the production in an effort to fight anti-American propaganda in Europe by the Russian Soviet Federative Socialist Republic. From Dallas the tour first went to the Civic Opera House in Chicago, the Nixon Theater in Pittsburgh, and the National Theatre in Washington, D.C. United States President Harry S. Truman attended a performance at the latter theatre.

Just prior to beginning the European portion of the tour, Price married her co-star in the production, the bass-baritone William Warfield, who portrayed Porgy. Some sources claim Warfield and Price met for the first time during rehearsals of Porgy and Bess and quickly formed a romantic attachment. This narrative, however, does not match the account given in Richard Steins's 1993 biography on Price, which states they met when Davis and Breen brought Warfield with them to see Price perform in the Juilliard production of Falstaff. According to Stein, Warfield began dating Price soon after this and would pick her up at her residence at the International House of New York where she lived during her senior year at Juilliard prior to the Porgy and Bess tour.

Price and Warfield were married on August 31, 1952, at the Abyssinian Baptist Church in Harlem, with the cast of Porgy and Bess in attendance. The day after their wedding the cast was flown to Europe by the U.S. State Department aboard a military airplane with the stated goal of the tour being to refute communist claims that black Americans were repressed by the American government and lacked opportunities. In addition to the cast, the state department arranged for American reporters to join the cast on portions of the tour, and traveled with its own professional photographer who routinely sent photos to the press. Among the media representatives who joined the cast on parts of the tour were Truman Capote for The New Yorker and the publisher of The New York Times, Arthur Hays Sulzberger, along with his wife Iphigene Ochs Sulzberger.

The well-coordinated media and diplomatic campaign of the U.S. State Department also required the Porgy and Bess cast to attend and perform at embassy events in every city along the tour. Due to her talent and her ability to conduct herself with both ladylike poise and strength, Price was used by U.S. State Department to project an image of anti-racism on the global stage. Additionally, the legend of the Chisholm family's support for Price was co-opted by Anthony Carlisle, a writer for the U.S. State Department, to tell a story of happy race relations in the American South to counter communist narratives and anti-imperial messaging from the Soviet Union during the Cold War. Carlisle consciously worked to curate a "good black diva" image of Price in the press during this tour which followed her into her later career.

The European portion of the tour opened on September 7, 1952, at the Vienna State Opera; a performance which marked the first time Porgy and Bess was performed in Europe. It then headed to the Titania-Palast to open the 1952 Berlin Festival. Although many Black newspapers criticized the export of Porgy and Bess as presenting a false and demeaning picture of Black life, the Breen production showed off a new generation of highly trained Black singers, and affirmed that Americans could revive a musical masterpiece, while recognizing its outdated stereotypes. Many East Berliners crossed to West Berlin to see the show, to the degree that the State Department ordered that East German currency be accepted at face value instead of the current exchange rate.

From Berlin, the production moved on to London where it opened at the Stoll Theatre in the West End on October 9, 1952. It ran at the Stoli for a total of 140 performances; closing on February 7, 1953. During the show's West End run, Warfield left the show in December 1952 in order to fulfill concert tour engagements in the United States with Price remaining in the London production. Warfield's inability to adjust a busy recital and concert schedule led to a long separation from his wife, with Price singing Bess for another year without him. Warfield said the period of physical separation put a strain on their young marriage. The couple was legally separated in 1967, and divorced in 1973. They had no children.

Porgy and Bess began its run at the Théâtre de l'Empire in Paris on February 16, 1953. After returning to the United States, the production played on Broadway at the Ziegfeld Theatre where it opened with a matinée performance reserved for an invited audience on March 9, 1953. It officially opened to the public the following day, and ran at the Ziegfeld Theatre for a total of 305 performances; closing on November 28, 1953. Price and her husband bought a home in Greenwich Village which they moved into during the New York run of Porgy and Bess. A Federal era home, it once belonged to Vice President of the United States Aaron Burr.

After the Broadway run closed, Porgy and Bess returned to the National Theatre in Washington D.C. from December 1953 into early 1954 with Price playing Bess opposite Leslie Scott as Porgy. The production then moved to the Taft Theatre in Cincinnati, Ohio where began its Ohio run on February 1, 1954. Price sang Bess for its first night of performance at the Music Hall in Kansas City, Missouri, on February 22, 1954 with LeVern Hutcherson as Porgy, and also opened the production's run in a return engagement at the Chicago Civic Opera on March 2, 1954 with Scott once again as Porgy.

At this point in the tour, Price was alternating performances of Bess with fellow sopranos Irene Williams and Elizabeth Foster. She was still with the production when it played at the Lyceum Theatre in Minneapolis in March 1954, but left the tour for a brief period the following month to represent the United States at the International Conference of Contemporary Music in Rome. At that festival she notably performed Lou Harrison's "Air" from his 1952 opera Rapunzel with a chamber orchestra led by Carlos Surinach. It was performed as part of a composition competition which won Harrison third prize at the festival; an award presented to him by Igor Stravinsky.

By the end of April 1954 Price was back in the Porgy and Bess production; appearing as Bess at the Cass Theatre in Detroit. She continued in the production for performances at the Hanna Theatre in Cleveland in May 1954, and the Curran Theatre in San Francisco the following June. After this, the Davis and Breen production of Porgy and Bess went on hiatus, only to resume for a second international tour that commenced in September 1954. Price was Bess for the opening of this second tour which began at the Venice Festival of Contemporary Music on September 21, 1954; a performance which marked the opera's first performance in Italy. This three month long tour was paid for by the Eisenhower administration's Emergency Fund for International Affairs and included further performances in Egypt, Israel, Yugoslavia, Greece, Morocco, and Spain.

===== Impact of Porgy and Bess =====
Price credited her experience performing in Porgy and Bess over an extended run with teaching her the art of "pacing" within a performance, and developing her into a seasoned stage performer that was a "training ground" for her opera career. The work significantly raised Price's profile as an artist on the national and international stage and fostered opportunities to sing under prominent orchestras and conductors. In the midst of the Broadway run she was invited by the Metropolitan Opera to perform the aria "Summertime" during a "Met Jamboree" radio broadcast on April 6, 1953. It was recorded live at Broadway's Ritz Theater.

Price and her husband performed excerpts from Porgy and Bess with the Boston Symphony Orchestra under conductor Leonard Bernstein in August 1953. The following year they performed excerpts from the opera with the New York Philharmonic at Lewisohn Stadium. She performed that music again for annual "Gershwin night" concerts at the Lewisohn Stadium in 1955 and 1956. Warfield and Price also performed music from Porgy and Bess with the Philadelphia Orchestra under Erich Leinsdorf in January 1955; on The Voice of Firestone television program in July 1955; and at the Hollywood Bowl with the Los Angeles Philharmonic led by Andre Kostelanetz. The latter performance was recorded live for national radio broadcast on NBC Radio.

By 1956, Price was refusing further offers to sing the music of Porgy and Bess, and stated that she would no longer include the work in her repertoire. However, she did perform excerpts from the work once more with her husband, the Los Angeles Philharmonic, and the Roger Wagner Chorale at the Hollywood Bowl in 1957 on the occasion of their 5th Wedding Anniversary. Samuel Goldwyn offered Price the part of Bess in the 1959 film version of the opera, but she responded "No body, no voice." She did, however, ultimately record portions of the opera with Warfield in 1963 for RCA Victor; a recording which one writer stated in 1999 "set the standard of performance by which this opera is still measured.

==== Early recitals, concert performances, and other public events ====
When Price left the production of Porgy and Bess in 1954, she did so with the intent of focusing on her work as a concert and oratorio singer. While she loved opera and had interest in an opera career, at that time she believed that racial prejudice would make it impossible for her to have a career on the opera stage. Additionally, she was offered a contract with Columbia Artists Management in 1953; and André Mertens, her talent manager at Columbia, was able to keep her busy on the concert and recital stage.

Price already had years of experience in professional concert engagements which began during her studies at Juilliard. In August 1949 she gave a concert at the Alamo Theatre in Jackson, Mississippi. Sponsored by Boyd Campbell, a wealthy businessman in Jackson, the concert was attended by many prominent citizens of that city. The review in The Clarion-Ledger was glowing, with the critic stating, "it was the best voice heard in the Capitol City in many years". As with many of her early recitals, Price was accompanied by Mrs. Chisholm at the piano. Another one of Price's early recitals that received press attention was a 1950 recital she gave with Mrs. Chisholm at Sweet Briar College in Virginia. Mrs. Chisholm also performed with Price in 1950 recitals she gave in Meridian, Mississippi and Mobile, Alabama.

In April 1953 Price performed in a concert dedicated to composer Henri Sauguet that was presented at the Museum of Modern Art under the auspices of the International Society for Contemporary Music in which she performed his song cycle La Voyante with a small orchestra. In October 1953, she sang in a recital at the Library of Congress with Barber at the piano. The program included the world premiere of his song cycle Hermit Songs. She and Barber performed this song cycle again at the Twentieth Century Music Conference in Rome, Italy on April 14, 1954 at the Conservatorio Santa Cecilia, the South Mountain Music Festival in Massachusetts in July 1954, and for her first recital appearance in New York at The Town Hall on November 14, 1954. It was also one of the first works she recorded for Columbia Records; appearing on Columbia's five disc "Modern American Music Series" in 1955 which featured mainly performers from American conservatories like the Juilliard School. She received international press coverage for her performance of the cycle in Rome, with Wayland Young of London's The Observer stating the following in his review:

"The voice had it: song cycles by Prokoviev, Britten, and Barber were all true songs, a spontaneous combustion of music round the words. The last, Barber's "Hermit Songs", brought the house down. They were sung by that very great soprano, the negress Leontyne Price, who can fill the hall with her voice or lay it privately in your lap as she likes."

In November 1953 Price and Warfield performed scenes from the third act of Aida on the television program The Kate Smith Hour with Price in the title role and Warfield as Amonasro. On January 27, 1954 the couple gave a joint recital at the Academy of Music in Philadelphia; the first of only a few times the married duo performed in a recital format together. In February 1954 she returned to Wilberforce to perform a recital at her alma mater, now known as Central State College. It was presented in conjunction with a guest lecture given by George Schuyler. She returned to Central State the following year for a second recital, at which time the university awarded her the National Alumni Merit Award for outstanding achievement in music.

On December 3, 1954 Price was the soprano soloist in the world premiere of Barber's Prayers of Kierkegaard which she performed with the Boston Symphony Orchestra (BSO) and the Cecilia Society Chorus under conductor Charles Munch at Symphony Hall in Boston. The work was repeated later that month at Carnegie Hall. Unusually, some press covered the work's dress rehearsal which was given with Price as vocalist on December 1, 1954 at Symphony Hall as part of the national conference of the National Council of Churches. The audience, made up NCC members and approximately 600 students from seminaries in New England, heard the work after listening to a lecture delivered by Assistant United States Secretary of Labor J. Ernest Wilkins Sr. who spoke on the need for church leaders to be at the forefront of desegregation by ending discrimination in the church. Price later reprised the work with the BSO at both the Tanglewood Music Festival in July 1955 and for an August 1955 televised performance of the work which was aired by NBC.

In March 1955 Price had an important personal triumph when she became the first black singer to perform in her hometown of Laurel, Mississippi in a theatre containing a "mixed audience" which consisted of approximately 2,000 black and 1,000 white Laurel citizens. That same month she performed for the first time on the stage of the Metropolitan Opera House (but not in an opera or for the Met) with the choir of the Tuskegee Institute at an event raising funds for the United Negro College Fund. This event's guest speaker was United States Secretary of State John Foster Dulles. On March 27, 1955 she sang a recital broadcast nationally on the CBS Radio program The Music Room.

In April 1955 Price sang at a concert sponsored by the American Composers Forum on the campus of Columbia University in which she performed John La Montaine's song cycle Songs of the Rose of Sharon with the composer as her accompanist. She later performed the work in its first presentation in New York with an orchestra in December 1957; singing the piece with the National Symphony Orchestra (NSO) led by conductor Howard Mitchell at Carnegie Hall. She repeated the work again with the NSO on tour to Boston in January 1959.

On April 25, 1955 Price performed the United States premiere of Wilhelm Killmayer's Lorca-Romanzen at the Art Institute of Chicago with members of the Chicago Symphony Orchestra led by conductor George Schick. On June 2, 1955, she and her husband gave a joint benefit concert at the Carter Barron Amphitheatre in Washington D.C. to raise funds for the National Council of Negro Women.

In February 1956, in recognition of National Negro History Week (a precursor of Black History Month), Price was selected as the guest speaker and singer for a national broadcast on NBC Radio. It was presented in conjunction with the National Association of Negro Musicians with that organization having representing members perform with the NBC Symphony Orchestra and Price on the broadcast. The following month she began a concert tour of India that was co-sponsored by the American National Theater and Academy and the U.S. State Department. That tour, along with a few earlier appearances in North America, marked the beginning of her long collaboration with pianist David Garvey which lasted until Garvey's death in 1995. The U.S. State department also sent Price along with a team of other musicians to represent the nation at the 1958 Brussels World's Fair. In 1957 she and Garvey gave recital tours in first Canada and then Australia.

In May 1956 Price and her husband joined fellow African-American singers Luther Saxon and Carol Brice as soloists in Robert Nathaniel Dett's oratorio The Ordering of Moses for performances at the Cincinnati May Festival with the Cincinnati Symphony Orchestra. In July 1956 she sang a concert of opera arias by Mozart, Verdi, and Handel with the Los Angeles Philharmonic under Igor Markevitch, and in August 1956 she gave a recital at the Redlands Bowl with Yaltah Menuhin as her accompanist. In December 1956 she made her first appearance at the San Francisco Opera House as the soprano soloist in Bach's Christmas Oratorio which she sang with the San Francisco Symphony and conductor Enrique Jordá.

In January 1957 Price gave a recital at Constitution Hall in Washington D.C. with critics particularly praising her performance of Benjamin Britten's song cycle On This Island. In February 1957 she was the soprano soloist in Verdi's Requiem with the Philadelphia Orchestra and the Rutgers University Choir under conductor Eugene Ormandy for performances at Philadelphia's Academy of Music and Carnegie Hall in New York. Her fellow soloists were Nan Merriman, Richard Tucker, and Giorgio Tozzi. This group later recorded the work for radio broadcast on CBS Radio in April 1957. That same month she gave a recital at Orchestra Hall at Symphony Center in Chicago. On May 21, 1957 she gave her first performance in Australia singing the Mozart aria "Ach, ich fühl's" with the Sydney Symphony Orchestra.

Price sang the role of St Marguerite in Honegger's Joan of Arc at the Stake with the New York Philharmonic (NYP) under conductor Leonard Bernstein. It was recorded live for national radio broadcast on the NBC Blue Network on April 27, 1958. Price reunited with Bernstein on November 30, 1958 when she performed as the soprano soloist in Beethoven's Symphony No. 9 with the NYP and the chorus of Westminster Choir College. Her fellow soloists included Maureen Forrester, Léopold Simoneau, and Norman Scott. Sponsored by the Ford Motor Company, the performance was filmed for broadcast on CBS television. She had earlier performed this same work with the Montreal Symphony Orchestra, conductor Igor Markevitch, and singers Nell Rankin, Richard Verreau, and Jan Rubeš in April 1958. She also performed Symphony No. 9 with the Boston Symphony Orchestra, the chorus of the New England Conservatory, and conductor Charles Munch on December 20, 1958; a concert which was recorded for radio broadcast and which aired nationally on February 8, 1959.

In August 1958 Price returned to the Hollywood Bowl to sing a concert of opera arias and duets with Irene Dalis, the Los Angeles Philharmonic (LAP), and conductor Wilfred Pelletier. Later that same month was heard with the LAP and the Roger Wagner Chorale in the Symphony No. 9 with Ormandy leading the orchestra. On October 31, 1958 she joined with her husband and singers Martha Lipton and Davis Cunningham to perform as the soloists in Handel's Messiah with the Philadelphia Orchestra, Ormandy, and the Mormon Tabernacle Choir at Philadelphia's Academy of Music. It was performed to commemorate the 200th anniversary of Handel's death, and was later repeated at Carnegie Hall in New York in November 1958. The following month she gave a recital at Orchestra Hall in Chicago with Chicago Tribune critic Seymour Raven stating, "Again and again, Miss Price sent a soaring voice out for conquest and brought back trophies, never grabbing but simply taking serenely and surely."

On February 1, 1959 Price gave a recital at the recently built SF Masonic Auditorium. It was one of several recitals she performed with David Garvey on a West Coast tour of California and Oregon in early 1959. The tour also included concerts at the Shrine Auditorium in Los Angeles on March 7, 1959, and stops in Canada where the duo performed at the Owen Sound Collegiate and Vocational Institute and the Eaton Auditorium in Toronto. On April 4, 1959 she performed a benefit concert at the DAR Constitution Hall to raise funds for the Medico Chirurgical Society of the District of Columbia; an organization which is devoted to health causes affecting the black community in Washington D.C.

On December 14, 1959 Price performed Barber's Knoxville: Summer of 1915 with the NYP led by Thomas Schippers. It was recorded live for radio broadcast. She had previously performed the work with the NYP for multiple concerts at Carnegie Hall in November 1959.

=== Emergence on the opera stage ===
==== Challenging prejudice: Racial integration and NBC Opera Theatre ====
Prior to the mid 1940s there were no professional opera companies in the United States that would employ African-Americans due to racial prejudice. That barrier was first broken in 1945 when Laszlo Halasz, the director of the New York City Opera (NYCO), hired Todd Duncan to play Tonio in a production of Pagliacci. The following year Camilla Williams became the first black woman to star in a production with a major American opera company when she performed the title heroine in Madama Butterfly with NYCO. Yet, despite these early trailblazers, opportunities for black opera singers were still highly limited in the 1950s. One black classical singer of the era stated that work for most black classical singers at that time was limited to appearing in concerts and recitals at churches and black colleges and sororities. America's most lauded opera company, the Metropolitan Opera, did not feature a black singer on the Met stage until Marian Anderson performed there on January 7, 1955; an event which Price witnessed as an audience member.

Davis and Breen's Porgy and Bess revival provided Price and her black co-stars an unprecedented opportunity which brought them prestige not previously afforded to African American singers on the world stage. Yet, the Porgy and Bess revival was not attached to an American opera company, and her arrival to an American opera house was not immediate or guaranteed. The Porgy and Bess production was also dismissed in the minds of some critics as not reaching the level of high art. In a 1961 article in The New York Times critic Allen Hughes acknowledged that Porgy and Bess "catapulted [Price] to international fame" in 1952 while simultaneously arguing that "Price made her first significant stage appearance in a serious opera in 1957" when she made her debut at the San Francisco Opera; in essence discrediting her prior work in opera.

Price's first appearance in a grand opera occurred not on the stage, but in the young medium of television. In November 1954 she was hired by music director Peter Herman Adler and producer Samuel Chotzinoff to perform with the NBC Opera Theatre in the title role of Giacomo Puccini's Tosca. When she performed this role in a broadcast on January 23, 1955 it marked the first appearance by an African American in a leading role in an opera on television. (Note: Another Black soprano, Veronica Tyler, had sung in the NBC Opera chorus for several seasons.) and also marked Price's first professional grand opera performance. Due to the large audience share of individual television networks of the period, the performance was the first time in history that a black woman was seen performing in an opera before a wide audience. It is considered an important moment for "breaking the color barrier in the operatic world". Yet this appearance was also dismissed as not serious work in Hughes's assessment of Price's career in his 1961 profile on her in The New York Times.

The decision to cast Price in the 1955 Tosca broadcast was partly done by NBC to "project an image of tolerance and inclusion" in an effort to aid the cause of racial integration in American culture. At that time NBC had officially adopted "integration without identification" as a stated goal of the network, and internal memos indicate that they were consciously casting Price as part of that initiative. The production was notably one of the earliest instances of a mixed-racial couple to appear on American television; with Price's romantic lead being her white co-star, tenor David Poleri. The conscious decision to promote integration was not without its controversy. At least eleven and possibly twelve NBC affiliate stations in the American South refused to broadcast the opera because it featured an interracial couple. The controversy was also not lost on American audiences, with some writing letters of congratulations, including one from the NAACP, and others angrily accusing the network of making opera political and ruining the work by casting Price in the role of Tosca.

Price did receive good reviews in the national press for her singing in the Tosca broadcast, and the performance made her a well known name across America and in the opera world. Olin Downes wrote the following about Price's performance in his review in The New York Times:

Her greatest achievement was her singing. What degree of strength and sonority her voice would have in the theatre, against Puccini's frequently tumultous instrumentation, may not be known here, in view of the special facilities for magnifying and balancing tone relations that television affords. But yesterday her voice was superbly equal to all demands made upon it. In the dramatic character of the upper register, the warmth and sensuousness of the tone throughout and the sincerity and feeling everywhere evident. The voice became freer, fuller and richer with each scene. Miss Price never sought to obtrude her equipment as a singer upon the development of the drama, of which she sought at all times to be a component part. When the solo opportunity arrived, as it does, for example, in the aria of sup- plication in the second act – the one familiar in the words of the Italian text, "Vissi d'arte" she sang it gloriously, coloring her tones in a delivery as unaffected as it was communicative. Dramatically, also, this performance was a cresendo, reaching its strongest manifestation in the final act.

Price went on to star in three other NBC Opera broadcasts, as Pamina in Mozart's The Magic Flute in 1956, as Madame Lidoine in Poulenc's Dialogues of the Carmelites in 1957, and as Donna Anna in Mozart's Don Giovanni in 1960. She was also a featured performer on the very first television program, Entertainment 1955, broadcast from NBC Color City Studios Burbank on March 27, 1955; a broadcast which marked a historic moment in the history of color television. Hosted by Fred Allen, Price appeared in a variety line-up which also included Bob Hope, Helen Hayes, Milton Berle, Dinah Shore, Judy Holliday, and Dennis Day. On this program she sang excerpts from Tosca with baritone Josh Wheeler who portrayed Scarpia in the NBC Opera production. While broadcast in color, the number of people with television sets in their homes capable of viewing color television was very small, and most individuals viewed the performance in black and white.

The attention from the Tosca broadcast led to an offer from the Metropolitan Opera's director, Rudolf Bing, for Price to make her debut at the Met in the title role of the slave-princess Aida. However, Price declined this opportunity after being advised by Peter Herman Adler not to take it. Adler reportedly said, "Leontyne is to be a great artist... When she makes her debut at the Met, she must do it as a lady, not a slave." The Tosca broadcast also led to other television engagements, including multiple appearances on The Tonight Show with Steve Allen in 1955.

==== San Francisco Opera and early success on the American opera stage ====
The success of the NBC Tosca opened doors for Price on the opera stage, and with the assistance of Mertens, her talent manager, her career opportunities multiplied in the late 1950s. In October 1956 she performed the role of Cleopatra to Cesare Siepi's Caesar in a concert version of George Frideric Handel's Giulio Cesare with the American Opera Society (AOS) and conductor Arnold Gamson at Town Hall. She performed in concert with the AOS again the following year in the title role of Claudio Monteverdi's L'incoronazione di Poppea. On May 3, 1957 she performed the title role in Verdi's Aida in a concert version of the opera at the Hill Auditorium on the campus of the University of Michigan. Performed with the Philadelphia Orchestra for Ann Arbor's May Festival, it marked the first time Price sang a complete performance of the opera.

Price's first performance at a major opera company occurred with the San Francisco Opera (SFO) on September 20, 1957 with Price portraying Madame Lidoine in the U.S. premiere of Dialogues of the Carmelites. In October 1957 she appeared as Aida at the SFO, replacing Antonietta Stella, who had cancelled due to an illness a month prior to the performance. In September 1958, she returned to the SFO as Leonora in Verdi's Il trovatore, with the Swedish tenor Jussi Björling as Manrico, Claramae Turner as Azucena, Louis Quilico as the Count di Luna, and Georges Sébastian conducting. She performed with the SFO following month as the Peasant's Daughter in the United States premiere of Carl Orff's Die Kluge with Lorenzo Alvary portraying her father.

Other roles Price sang with the San Francisco Opera during her career included Donna Elvira in Don Giovanni (1959), Cio-Cio-San in Madama Butterfly (1960 and 1961), Liù in Turandot (1961), Tosca (1963), Leonora in La forza del destino (1963, 1965, and 1979), Donna Anna in Don Giovanni (1965), Amelia in Un ballo in maschera (1967), Elvira in Ernani (1968), Giorgetta in Il tabarro (1971), and the title roles in Manon Lescaut (1974) and Ariadne auf Naxos (1977). She also returned to the SFO many times in Aida and Il trovatore, and repeated the role of Madame Lidoine in SFO's 1982 revival of Dialogues of the Carmelites. Her last appearance at the SFO in a staged opera was as Aida in 1984; although she later sang with the company in a 1988 memorial concert honoring Kurt Herbert Adler and in a 1992 recital.

On October 28, 1959, Price performed for the first time with the Lyric Opera of Chicago (LOC) as Liu in Puccini's Turandot in a production staged by Vladimir Rosing with conductor Gianandrea Noseda leading the musical forces. Birgit Nilsson performed the title role and Giuseppe Di Stefano portrayed Calaf. The following month she sang the title role in the LOC's first staging of Jules Massenet's Thaïs. She returned to the LOC in 1960 to perform the roles of Aida and Cio-Cio-San.

==== International breakthrough ====
Mertens introduced Price to conductor Herbert von Karajan in 1955 while he was touring the United States with the Berlin Philharmonic. Price auditioned for Karajan, and he reportedly said to Price, "You are an artist of the future." Through Karajan she was able to obtain her first engagements in European houses; drawing initial acclaim for her portrayal of Aida. She became a frequent collaborator with Karajan in the late 1950s and 1960s.

The 1957-1958 season was a seminal one for Price's career. In addition to her SFO debut in 1957, she portrayed Aida for her European opera debut at the Vienna State Opera on May 25, 1958 with Karajan conducting. She performed Aida again for her first performance at the Royal Opera House in London (replacing Anita Cerquetti), on July 2, 1958 with Carlos Guichandut as Radamès, John Shaw as Amonasro, Regina Resnik (also in her Covent Garden debut) as Amneris, and Rafael Kubelík conducting. Her Royal Opera debut was widely reported as a triumph with the Birmingham Post critic stating that Price was "the best all-around Aida heard in decades". She was also celebrated as Aida at the Arena di Verona Festival where she performed the role in late July and early August 1958 under conductor Tullio Serafin. Her success there led Serafin to offer her future engagements at the Teatro dell'Opera di Roma. Price said the following in a 1971 interview with Alan Blyth:

"My major break came when I went to Europe and sang Aida at Covent Garden and the Vienna State Opera, there beginning my association with Karajan. I gained a wealth of experience and knowledge working with him that has held me in good stead ever since. Indeed I'm still doing things today that I then learned."

In May 1959 Price returned to the Vienna State Opera to sing Aida and her first onstage performance of Pamina in The Magic Flute. She performed the latter work under conductor Karl Boehm with Erich Kunz as Papageno. She then returned to Covent Garden to sing Aida again; this time with Edward Downes leading the musical forces and Jon Vickers and Flaviano Labo alternating as Radamès. In the midst of this production she performed on BBC Radio with the BBC Symphony Orchestra led by conductor Peter Herman Adler (but prepared by Paul Beard) on May 27, 1959; singing a concert of operatic scenes by Richard Strauss. She next gave a recital of American songs with pianist Gerald Moore which was broadcast on BBC Television on June 4, 1959.

External audio
- Hear Leontyne Price in Mozart's Requiem with Herbert von Karajan conducting the Vienna Philharmonic, and Hilde Rössel-Majdan, Fritz Wunderlich, Eberhard Waechter and Walter Berry in 1960

In August 1959 Price returned to Austria to sing her first performance at the Salzburg Festival; appearing as the soprano soloist in Beethoven's Missa solemnis with Karjan conducting the Vienna Philharmonic. Her fellow soloists included Christa Ludwig, Nicolai Gedda, and Nicola Zaccaria. In Vienna, she made her first full opera recording, singing Donna Elvira in Mozart's Don Giovanni, conducted by Erich Leinsdorf. It was released by RCA Records in 1961. She returned to the Salzburg Festival for performances of Mozart's Requiem (1960), Verdi's Requiem (1962), and Johann Sebastian Bach's Mass in B minor (1961). She portrayed Donna Anna in Don Giovanni at the Salzburg Festival in 1960 and 1961; a production which marked her first performance of that role having previously only sung the part of Elvira. She later performed the role of Leonara in Il trovatore at the Salzburg Festival in 1962, 1963, and 1977.

On May 21, 1960, Price sang for the first time at La Scala in Milan, again as Aida and without any prior rehearsal. The reception was tumultuous, and a Milanese critic wrote that "our great Verdi would have found her the ideal Aida". Some sources claim that Price was the first African-American to sing at La Scala. However, that distinction belongs to soprano Mattiwilda Dobbs who performed the principal role of Elvira in Rossini's L'italiana in Algeri in 1953. Other sources qualify the claim, stating that Price was the "first African American to sing a prima donna role" at La Scala.

In Salzburg that summer, Price sang her first Donna Anna in Don Giovanni, again with Karajan. She then returned to Vienna to appear first as Cio-Cio-San in Puccini's Madama Butterfly. She was also the soprano soloist in Verdi's Messa da Requiem at the Vienna Festival with conductor Carlo Maria Giulini. It was performed to a sold out crowd at the Konzerthaus, Vienna on June 9, 1960 with Price's fellow soloists including Fiorenza Cossotto, Luigi Ottolini, and Ivo Vinco. She returned to the Vienna Festival in 1963 to portray the title in Tosca with Karajan conducting.

Price recorded a second full opera, Il trovatore, for RCA in Rome; then returned to Verona to sing Il trovatore with tenor Franco Corelli. Rudolf Bing was at one of the performances, and went backstage to invite Price and Corelli to make their Met debuts in the 1960–61 season.

In 1963 Price performed Verdi's Requiem with Karajan and the Berlin Philharmonic and the chorus of the Gesellschaft der Musikfreunde at the Lucerne Festival.

=== Metropolitan Opera ===
==== Met debut ====
Bing had made overtures to Price before, and in 1958 had invited her to sing two Aidas. She turned him down on the advice of Adler and others, who argued that she should wait until she had more repertoire under her belt and could arrive as a true prima donna. Adler also warned against arriving in the racially stereotypical role of Aida, an Ethiopian slave. In his autobiography, Warfield quotes Adler as saying: "Leontyne is to be a great artist. When she makes her debut at the Met, she must do it as a lady, not a slave." Eventually, her first Met contract (signed December 30, 1959) booked her for five of her signature roles in 1961, Leonora in Il trovatore, Aida, Donna Anna, Liu, and Butterfly. She was the fifth black performer to sing with the company; with Anderson, baritone Robert McFerrin and sopranos Mattiwilda Dobbs and Gloria Davy preceding her.

On January 27, 1961, Price and Franco Corelli made a joint debut at the Metropolitan Opera in Il trovatore. Price's performance as Leonora was enthusiastically received, and she overshadowed Corelli whose performance was largely ignored in the press. The performance ended with an ovation that was certainly one of the longest in Met history. A Met official said it lasted at least 35 minutes. Price said friends had timed it at 42 minutes, and that was the figure she used in her publicity. Opera critic Peter G. Davis said of her Met debut, that Price's "long battle for recognition seemed unequivocally won at last".

In his review, New York Times critic Harold C. Schonberg wrote that Price's "voice, warm and luscious, has enough volume to fill the house with ease, and she has a good technique to back up the voice itself. She even took the trills as written, and nothing in the part as Verdi wrote it gave her the least bit of trouble. She moves well and is a competent actress. But no soprano makes a career of acting. Voice is what counts, and voice is what Miss Price has."

Reviewers were less enthusiastic about Corelli, who was infuriated and told Bing the next day he would never sing with Price again. The outburst was soon forgotten, and Price and Corelli sang together often, at the Met, in Vienna, in Salzburg, and once, for Karajan's version of Bizet's Carmen, in the recording studio. In recognition of her extraordinary first season at the Met, Time magazine put her on its cover, and ran a profile under the headline, "A voice like a banner flying".

==== Early performances at the Met ====
Price was the first black singer at the Met to sustain a long career with the company; appearing at the Met in performances spanning a 24 year period. Price was a box-office hit (her performances in her first two seasons were almost all sold out), and the first to be asked to sing a season opening night, a true sign of prima donna status.

She sang Liu in Turandot at the Met in 1961 with Birgit Nilsson in the title role and Franco Corelli as Calaf. When she toured with this production to Philadelphia's Academy of Music that year it notably marked the end of a long standing Met tradition of bringing operas to Philadelphia for Tuesday night performances; it being the very last work the Met brought to Philadelphia in that structural format when Rudolf Bing ended the tradition.

The opening in September 1961, in Puccini's La fanciulla del West, almost didn't happen. That summer, a musicians' strike threatened and Bing, frustrated with the negotiations, canceled the season. Under pressure from the government, Bing and the musicians agreed to allow Secretary of Labor Arthur Goldberg to mediate a settlement.

For her first night, Price received enthusiastic reviews but during the second she confronted her first vocal crisis. In the middle of the second act, she slowly lost her voice and by the end of the scene she was shouting the words. The standby, soprano Dorothy Kirsten, was called and finished the performance. The newspapers said that Price was suffering a viral infection, but stress and the unsuitable weight of the role of Minnie played their parts.

After several weeks off, Price repeated Puccini's La fanciulla del West and then, after a Butterfly in December, which ended with the singer in tears, cleared her schedule and took a respite in Rome. The official word was that she had never fully recovered from the earlier virus. However, Price later said she was suffering from nervous exhaustion, having performed a schedule of history making intensity, without a vacation for several years. In April, now rested and in fine voice, she returned to the Met for her first Toscas and then joined the company's spring tour for the first time in Tosca, Butterfly, and Fanciulla. Recognizing that Price would have to be included on the tour, which would create problems for presenters in the segregated South, Bing declared that the Met would no longer perform to segregated houses, starting in 1962. Price gave the first performance by an African American to sing a leading role with the company in the South, singing Fanciulla in Dallas. Two years later, she sang Donna Anna in Atlanta, a first in the Deep South. Both performances occurred without incident.

Price was soon earning the Met's top fee. By 1964, she was paid was $2,750 per performance, on a par with Joan Sutherland, Maria Callas, and Renata Tebaldi, according to the Met archives. Birgit Nilsson, who was older and unique in singing both Italian and Wagnerian roles, earned a little more, at $3,000 a performance.

Price remained active in Vienna, Milan, and Salzburg. She performed a famous Il trovatore in Salzburg in 1962, and Tosca, Donna Anna and Aida, in Vienna, most often with Karajan. She was also the soprano soloist in many of Karajan's performances of Verdi's Requiem.

After the first Met season, Price added seven roles to her repertoire over the next five years: Elvira in Verdi's Ernani, Pamina, Fiordiligi in Mozart's Così fan tutte, Tatyana in Tchaikovsky's Eugene Onegin, Amelia in Un ballo in maschera, Cleopatra in Barber's Antony and Cleopatra, and Leonora in La forza del destino.

==== Antony and Cleopatra ====
In 1959 Samuel Barber was approached by Rudolph Bing to compose a new opera for the first season of the planned Metropolitan Opera House at Lincoln Center which had yet to be built. This offer was made after the successful premiere of his opera Vanessa at the Met in 1958. Barber initially struggled to find a story he wished to adapt for the stage; with potential collaborations with Tennessee Williams and James Baldwin among other writers all failing to bear fruit. By 1962 he had determined that Leontyne Price was to be his muse for this new opera, and in speaking with her it was determined that the story should center on a black woman to give Price another role besides Aida which starred a black character. Price also insisted that the story not feature one of white-black violence given the intensity of current events within the Civil Rights Movement.

Ultimately Barber settled on adapting his favorite play by William Shakespeare, Antony and Cleopatra, with the role of Cleopatra intended for Price. Bing hired Franco Zeffirelli to write the libretto, direct the production, and design the sets; a decision Barber learned about second hand in 1964 after he had already started writing his own libretto. Barber spent part of the summer of 1964 in Tuscany, Italy working with Zeffirelli on the libretto to the new opera, and then composed the work primarily at Capricorn, his home just north of New York City. In an interview with critic Howard Klein he stated that "Cleopatra's part is not easy, but every vowel was placed with Leontyne's voice in mind."

To prepare herself to portray Cleopatra, Price severely limited her performances in the year leading up to the 1966 premiere. She read the second century work Parallel Lives by Plutarch as well as other histories of Cleopatra. She also studied the Shakespeare play and learned the part of Cleopatra in the original play under the instruction of Royal Shakespeare Company actress Irene Worth in order that her own diction and character portrayal in the opera version might more effectively match the characterization in the original. She prepared the singing aspect of the role with her long time teacher Florence Kimball.

Antony and Cleopatra premiered at the grand opening of the Metropolitan Opera House on September 16, 1966 with a cast led by Price as Cleopatra and Justino Diaz as Mark Antony. The production featured a large cast of approximately 300 individuals, including 50 dancers which performed choreography by Alvin Ailey. The principal performers in the cast were all American as was its conductor, Thomas Schippers. The much hyped event was attended by celebrities as well as many luminaries in the opera world, prominent individuals in American society, and international figures of importance. Some of the members in the audience included Lady Bird Johnson, President of the Philippines Ferdinand Marcos, philanthropist John D. Rockefeller III, Governor of New York Nelson Rockefeller, United States Secretary of Defense Robert McNamara, theatre producer and first chairman of the National Endowment for the Arts Roger L. Stevens, Alfred Gwynne Vanderbilt Jr., Cornelius Vanderbilt Whitney, John Hay Whitney, United States senator J. William Fulbright, and cosmetics businesswoman Estée Lauder to name just a few. The Dictionary of World Biography described Price's participation in this event as the "highest honor" of her career.

While a landmark event for Price and the Met, Antony and Cleopatra was a troubled milestone. In reviews of the premiere, Price's singing was highly praised, but the opera as a whole received mixed reviews with particular negative attention given to the over complicated set designs of Zeffirelli. It was considered a failure by many, who found the sequence of scenes confusing, the Shakespearean text unintelligible, and Zeffirelli's production suffocatingly elaborate. Zeffirelli buried an essentially intimate score under giant scenery, a movable pyramid and sphinx, innumerable supernumeraries, and two camels. Part of the negative reaction to the work was also related to an upswing in anti-homosexual sentiment in the United States in the 1960s. Barber, who was gay, was attacked by some reviewers with text expressing homophobic remarks in their reviews; including an influential review in The New York Times by critic Harold C. Schonberg. Bing had overreached, too, by scheduling three other new productions in the first week in the new house, placing a burden on tech crews who were still learning how to run the new equipment and lighting. The chaotic final rehearsals, along with scenes of Price's beautiful singing, were captured by cinema verite director Robert Drew in a documentary on The Bell Telephone Hour, The New Met: Countdown to Curtain.

Despite the technical flaws at the premiere, Price recalled that performances of Antony and Cleopatra improved over the course of its seven succeeding performances in the first opera season at the new Metropolitan Opera House. While Bing had originally planned to program the opera in future seasons; those plans were ultimately abandoned and the opera was never performed again at the Met. Barber prepared a concert suite of Cleopatra's arias entitled Two Scenes from "Anthony and Cleopatra" which was premiered by Price in Washington, D.C. with the National Symphony Orchestra on February 24, 1968. Both this suite and the opera were dedicated to Orazio Orlando. Price recorded this suite with Thomas Schippers and the New Philharmonia Orchestra later that year for RCA. She later programmed the piece in concerts she gave internationally.

=== Late opera career ===
In the late 1960s, Price cut back her operatic performances and devoted more of her schedule to recitals and concerts. She said she was tired, stressed by racial tensions in the U.S., and frustrated with the number and quality of the new productions she'd been given at the Met. Her recitals and concerts (generally programs of arias with orchestra) were highly successful, and, for the next two decades, she was a mainstay in the major orchestral and concert series in the major American cities and universities.

In February 1968 Price's father died. On May 8, 1973 she was granted a divorce from her husband William Warfield. The couple had previously separated in 1959.

She realized she needed to maintain some visibility in opera as well, and she returned to the Met and the San Francisco Opera, her favorite house, for short runs of three to five performances, sometimes a year or more apart.

In October 1973, she returned to the Met to sing a triumphant Madama Butterfly for the first time in a decade. In 1976, she was at the heart of a long-promised new production of Aida at the Met, with James McCracken as Radames and Marilyn Horne as Amneris, directed by John Dexter.

At the same time, she was cautious – some said too cautious – in choosing new roles, conscious of her need to keep her reputation as a leading prima donna intact. After 1970, she performed only three new roles: Giorgetta in Puccini's Il tabarro in San Francisco; Puccini's Manon Lescaut, in San Francisco and New York; and the title role in Ariadne auf Naxos, also in San Francisco and New York. Of these, only Ariadne was considered by critics as superlative.

She appeared even more rarely in opera in Europe. In the early 1970s, she sang Aida and a single Forza in Hamburg, and returned to London's Covent Garden in Trovatore and Aida. In 1977 she performed Leonora in Il trovatore at the Vienna State Opera with Luciano Pavarotti as Manrico and Christa Ludwig as Azucena. However, she gave well received recitals in Hamburg, Vienna, Paris, and at the Salzburg Festival. At the latter she became a special favorite, appearing there in 1975, 1977, 1978, 1980, 1981, and 1984.

In 1976, after almost a decade, she renewed her partnership with Karajan in a performance of Brahms' Ein deutsches Requiem with the Berlin Philharmonic at Carnegie Hall. This was followed by a nostalgic revival of their famous 1962 Il trovatore production in Vienna and Salzburg, followed by a recording for EMI, all led by Karajan.

That fall, Price sang her first Strauss heroine: Ariadne in Ariadne auf Naxos The premiere in San Francisco was considered a great success. When she sang the role at the Met in 1979, she was suffering from a viral infection and canceled all but the first and last of eight scheduled performances. Reviewing the first performance, the New York Times critic John Rockwell was not complimentary.

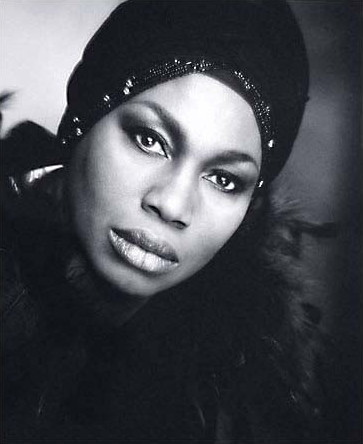
Price in 1981

In the U.S., her beautiful voice, personal dignity, and well known patriotism made her an iconic American, who was called to sing on important national or ceremonial occasions. In January 1973, she sang "Precious Lord, Take My Hand" and "Onward, Christian Soldiers" at the state funeral of President Lyndon B. Johnson. (She had sung "America the Beautiful" at his inauguration in January 1965.) In 1980, President Jimmy Carter invited her to sing at the White House for the visit of Pope John Paul II and at the state dinner after the signing of the Camp David Peace Accords.

In 1978, Carter had invited her to sing a recital from the East Room of the White House that was nationally televised and won an Emmy.

In 1982, she sang "Battle Hymn of the Republic" before a Joint Meeting of Congress on the 100th anniversary of the birth of President Franklin D. Roosevelt.

On July 4, 1983, she sang with the National Philharmonic on the Capitol Mall, and, in fall 1986, Price sang the national anthem backed by the Los Angeles Philharmonic on Orange County Performing Arts Center's opening.

Price also sang for Presidents Reagan, George H. W. Bush, and Clinton.

Her voice proved resilient as she entered her 50s. In the fall of 1981, she had a late triumph in San Francisco when she stepped in for an ailing Margaret Price as Aida, a role she had not sung since 1976. The Radames was Luciano Pavarotti, in his first assumption of the role. Herbert Caen of the San Francisco Chronicle reported that Price had insisted on being paid $1 more than the tenor. That would have made her, for the moment, the highest-paid opera singer in the world. The opera house denied the arrangement.

In 1982, Price returned to the Met as Leonora in Il trovatore, a role she hadn't sung in the house since 1969. She also sang a televised concert of duets and arias with Marilyn Horne and conductor James Levine, later released on record by RCA. In 1983, she hosted two televised performances of In Performance at the White House. with President Ronald and Nancy Reagan, and sang the Ballo duet with Pavarotti in the 100th anniversary concert of the Metropolitan Opera.

She had considered her 1982 Met appearances her unannounced final opera performances, but the Met's James Levine persuaded her to return for several Forzas in 1984 and a series of Aidas in 1984–1985. Performances of both operas were broadcast in the Live from the Met TV series on PBS. These were her first and only appearances in the series and important documents of two of her greatest roles.

Shortly before her final Aida, on January 3, 1985, word leaked that it was to be her operatic farewell. The performance ended with 25 minutes of applause and the singer's photograph on the front page of the local edition of The New York Times. The paper's critic Donal Henahan wrote that the "57-year-old soprano took an act or two to warm to her work, but what she delivered in the Nile Scene turned out to be well worth the wait." The performance was filmed for the television program Live from the Met and its cast also included James McCracken in the role of Radames.

In 2007, PBS viewers voted her singing of the act 3 aria, "O patria mia", as the no. 1 "Great Moment" in 30 years of Live from the Met telecasts. One critic described Price's voice as "vibrant", "soaring" and "a Price beyond pearls". Time magazine called her voice "Rich, supple and shining, it was in its prime capable of effortless soaring from a smoky mezzo to the pure soprano gold of a perfectly spun high C."

In 21 seasons with the Met, Price gave 201 performances, in 16 roles, in the house and on tour. After her 1961 debut season, she was absent for three seasons—1970–71, 1977–78, and 1980–81; and sang only in galas in 1972–73, 1979–80, and 1982–83.

=== Later life and post-operatic career ===
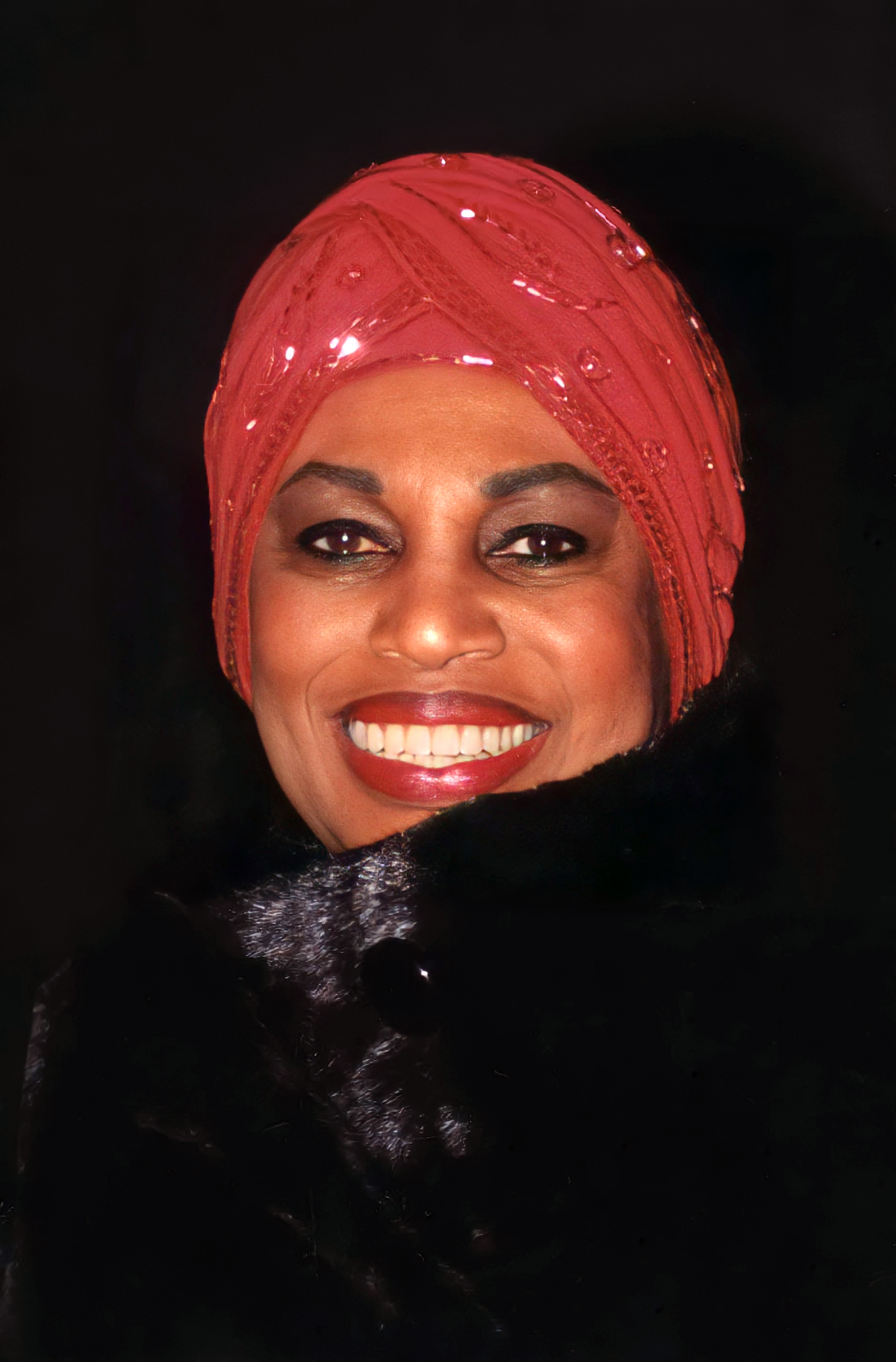
Price in 1995

For the next dozen years, Price continued to perform concerts and recitals in the U.S. Her recital programs, arranged by her longtime accompanist David Garvey, usually combined Handel arias or arie antiche, Lieder by Schumann and Joseph Marx, an operatic aria or two, followed by French mélodies, a group of American art songs by Barber, Ned Rorem, and Lee Hoiby, and spirituals. She liked to end her encores with "This Little Light of Mine", which she described as her "mother's spiritual".

In 1971 she sang at the funeral of civil rights leader Whitney Young, and that same year performed in a concert given in memory of Young at Philharmonic Hall that was organized by the National Urban League. It featured a eulogy delivered by Ramsey Clark. Other participants in this event included Marian Anderson, Ruby Dee, Nancy Wilson, Cannonball Adderley, Billy Taylor, Arthur Mitchell, and Jonelle Allen.

In 1991 Price was the host of a Lincoln Center concert "A Salute to American Music" in which she introduced excerpts from a dozen different American operas. This concert was recorded and released on CD.

Over time, Price's voice became darker and heavier, but the upper register held up extraordinarily well and her conviction and sheer delight in singing always spilled over the footlights. On November 19, 1997, she sang a recital at the University of North Carolina at Chapel Hill that was her unannounced last.

In her later years, Price gave master classes at Juilliard and other schools. In 1997, at the suggestion of RCA Victor, she wrote a children's book version of Aida, which became the basis for the hit Broadway musical by Elton John and Tim Rice in 2000.

Price avoided the term African American, preferring to call herself an American, even a "chauvinistic American". She summed up her philosophy thus: "If you are going to think black, think positive about it. Don't think down on it, or think it is something in your way. And this way, when you really do want to stretch out, and express how beautiful black is, everybody will hear you."

On September 30, 2001, at the age of 74, Price came out of retirement to sing in a memorial concert at Avery Fisher Hall for the victims of the September 11 attacks. She sang a cappella the spiritual "This Little Light of Mine" and then "God Bless America", ending this with a bright, easy high B-flat.

In 2017, the age of 90, Price appeared in Susan Froemke's The Opera House, a documentary about the opening of the new Metropolitan Opera House in Lincoln Center in 1966.

== Awards and honors ==
Among her many honors and awards are the Presidential Medal of Freedom (1964), the Spingarn Medal (1965), the Kennedy Center Honors (1980), the National Medal of Arts (1985), the Golden Plate Award of the American Academy of Achievement (1986), numerous honorary degrees, and 13 Grammy Awards for operatic and song recitals and full operas, and a Lifetime Achievement Award, more than any other classical singer. In October 2008, she was among the first recipients of the Opera Honors by the National Endowment for the Arts. In 2019, Leontyne Price was awarded an honorary doctorate degree from Boston Conservatory at Berklee.

In 1961 San Francisco mayor George Christopher proclaimed that April 16 would be known as "Leontyne Price Day" in the city of San Francisco. On December 14, 1969 Price was present at the dedication of the newly built Leontyne Price Library on the campus of Rust College in her home state of Mississippi. It was named for Price not only to honor her for her achievements but also because she helped raise the funds to build the library through giving a benefit concert. Price later recorded an album of spirituals with the Rust College Choir, Wish I Knew How It Would Feel To Be Free (1971, RCA); the proceeds of which were given to fund scholarships to Rust College. Her mother was a graduate of Rust College.

== Recordings ==
In 1955 Price made her first professional recording with Columbia Records for its "Modern American Music Series" series; performing Samuel Barber's Hermit Songs with the composer at the piano. Other recordings of Price and Barber performing this work together have also been released on disc; including the earlier world premiere performance at the Library of Congress in October 1953 (released by RCA in 1994 and later on the 2004 album Barber Historic Performances 1938-53).

In 1958 Price signed a recording contract with RCA Victor Red Seal; a contract she was offered after RCA's director Alan Kayes heard her perform in her debut at the San Francisco Opera in 1957. The majority of her recording output was made with RCA. Many of her RCA records have also been re-released by BMG Records. Her first recording as a contract singer under RCA was a 1959 album of Beethoven's Symphony No. 9 made with conductor Charles Munch, the Boston Symphony Orchestra, and the chorus of the New England Conservatory. That same year RCA released her debut solo album, A Program Of Song, which was a recital of German lieder and French art songs that she made with her longtime accompanist David Garvey. It won the 1961 Grammy Award for Best Classical Performance – Vocal Soloist, the first of many wins by Price. Price was also nominated that year for the Grammy Award for Best New Artist which she lost to Bob Newhart, a non-musician who won for his work as a spoken word artist and comedian.

Price was nominated for 25 Grammy Awards during her recording career; winning 13 times. Her 1961 Grammy winning self titled album Leontyne Price (also known as Operatic Arias and often called "the blue album") was dedicated to the music of Verdi and Puccini. She later won another Grammy Award for her 1973 album Puccini Heroines, and her 1975 album with tenor Plácido Domingo, Verdi & Puccini Duets, was nominated for a Grammy.

From 1964 through 1968 (honoring the years 1963-1967) Price had five consecutive wins of the Grammy Award for Best Classical Solo Vocal Album which was at that time a record winning streak at the Grammy Awards only matched by Henry Mancini. It was a short lived record, however, as Bill Cosby broke that record with six consecutive wins of the Grammy Award for Best Comedy Album at the 12th Annual Grammy Awards in 1970. Albums in this winning streak included Great Scenes From Gershwin's Porgy and Bess (1964 Grammy Awards) with Price's husband William Warfield singing Porgy; El Amor Brujo / Les Nuits d'été (1965 Grammy Awards) with Price performing these works with Fritz Reiner and the Chicago Symphony Orchestra; Salome: Dance of the Seven Veils/ Interlude and Final Scene; The Egyptian Helen : Awakening Scene (1966 Grammy Awards) performed with Erich Leinsdorf and the Boston Symphony Orchestra; Leontyne Price, Prima Donna: Great Soprano Arias from Purcell to Barber (1967 Grammy Awards), and Leontyne Price, Prima Donna / Volume 2: Great Soprano Arias from Handel to Puccini (1968 Grammy Awards).

The latter two albums were the first in a series of five "Prima Donna" albums, recorded from 1965 to 1979. A box set of these works, Leontyne Price: A Prima Donna Collection, was first released on tape in 1983, and then later on CD in 1992. The New York Times Anthony Tommasini described the overall reception of the Primma Donna collection as "critically hailed" in his assessment of Price's recording career. Consisting of 47 opera arias across five discs, opera historian Clyde T. McCants stated that "the Prima Donna Collection is by all accounts the most comprehensive demonstration of the art of the soprano that has ever been committed to disc by a single artist."

Price's first studio recording of a full length opera was made with Decca Records in 1959; a recording of Don Giovanni with Cesare Siepi in the title role, Birgit Nilsson as Donna Anna, Cesare Valletti as Don Ottavio, and Price as Donna Elvira. This was followed later that year by an RCA studio recording of Il trovatore made at the Teatro dell'Opera di Roma with conductor Arturo Basile. Price sang Leonora to Richard Tucker's Manrico and Leonard Warren's Conte di Luna on this recording. She recorded Il trovatore again for RCA in 1969 with the New Philharmonia Orchestra led by Zubin Mehta; this time with Placido Domingo as Manrico and Sherrill Milnes as the Conte di Luna. She made one final studio recording of Il trovatore with Herbert von Karajan and the Berlin Philharmonic which was released by EMI Records in 1977. Several live recordings of Il trovatore with Price have also been released on disc; including a February 4, 1961 performance from the Met on Myto Records; a July 3, 1962, performance at the Salzburg Festival on Paragon Records; and a June 5, 1969 performance at the Teatro Colón among others.

Other complete recordings of operas featuring Price include studio recordings of Aida (1962 and 1970), Tosca (1962 and 1972), Madama Butterfly (1962), La forza del destino (1964 and 1976), Carmen (1964), Un ballo in maschera (1966), Ernani (1967), Cosí fan tutte (1967), and Il tabarro (1971). Her last studio recording of a complete opera role was Ariadne auf Naxos which was released in 1977. Many of her appearances in live operas have also been recorded and released on disc; including several of her performances at the Metropolitan Opera by Sony Records. Her farewell performance as Aida at the Metropolitan Opera in 1985 which was filmed for television broadcast on PBS.

== Reception ==
In The Grand Tradition, a 1974 history of operatic recording, the British critic J. B. Steane writes that "records show [Price] as the best singer of Verdi in this century", while identifying Carmen as "her most brilliant performance". The Russian soprano Galina Vishnevskaya remembered a 1963 Price performance of Tosca at the Vienna State Opera "left me with the strongest impression I have ever gotten from opera". In his 1983 autobiography, Plácido Domingo writes: "The power and sensuousness of Leontyne's voice were phenomenal—the most beautiful Verdi soprano I have ever heard."

While widely celebrated in the operas of Verdi, Price was less successful with critics in the operas of Mozart. Music historian Clyde T. McCants stated, "Price was not a natural Mozartian, but she sang often in his operas and applied herself diligently to the technical demands. The voice often seemed almost too luxurious to wrap its way comfortably around the twists and turns of Mozart's vocal line."

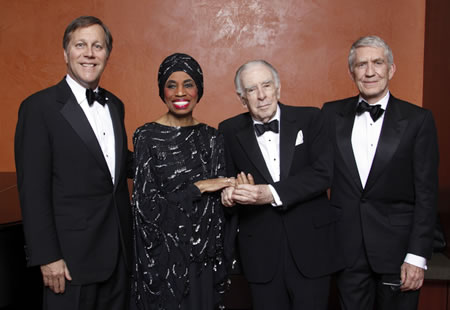
From left to right, NEA Chairman Dana Gioia honors the first class of National Endowment for the Arts Opera Honorees in 2008: Price, Carlisle Floyd, Richard Gaddes.

The sopranos Renée Fleming, Kiri Te Kanawa, Jessye Norman, Leona Mitchell, Barbara Bonney, Sondra Radvanovsky, the mezzo-sopranos Janet Baker and Denyce Graves, bass-baritone José van Dam, and the countertenor David Daniels, spoke of Price as an inspiration.

Jazz musicians were impressed too. Miles Davis, in Miles: The Autobiography, writes: "Man, I love her as an artist. I love the way she sings Tosca. I wore out her recording of that, wore out two sets. Now, I might not do Tosca, but I loved the way Leontyne did it. I used to wonder how she would have sounded if she had sung jazz. She should be an inspiration for every musician, Black or White. I know she is to me."

She has also had her critics. In his book The American Opera Singer, Peter G. Davis writes that Price had "a fabulous vocal gift that went largely unfulfilled", criticizing her reluctance to try new roles and her Tosca for its lack of a "working chest register". Others criticized her lack of flexibility in coloratura, and her occasional mannerisms, including scooping or swooping up to high notes, gospel-style. Karajan took her to task for these during rehearsals for the 1977 Il trovatore, as Price herself related in an interview in Diva, by Helena Matheopoulos. In later recordings and appearances, she sang with a cleaner line.

Her acting, too, drew different responses over a long career. As Bess, she was praised for her dramatic fire and sensuality, and tapes of the early NBC Opera appearances demonstrate an appealing presence on camera. In her early years at the Met, she was often praised for her stage presence as well as her vocal skill.

In March 2007, on BBC Music Magazine's list of the "20 All-time Best Sopranos" based on a poll of 21 British music critics and BBC presenters, Leontyne Price was ranked fourth, after Maria Callas, Joan Sutherland, and Victoria de los Ángeles.

== Notes and references ==
=== Bibliography ===
- Alba, Lois (2005). Vocal Rescue: Rediscover the Beauty, Power and Freedom in Your Singing. Elsevier Science. ISBN 9780815519485.
- Beardslee, Bethany; Proctor, Minna (2017). I Sang the Unsingable: My Life in Twentieth-century Music. University of Rochester Press. ISBN 9781580469005.
- Berg, A. Scott (1989). Goldwyn: A Biography. New York: Alfred A. Knopf. ISBN 0-394-51059-3.
- Bing, Rudolf (1972). 5,000 Nights at the Opera: The Memoirs of Sir Rudolf Bing. Doubleday. ISBN 9780385092593.
- Brooks, F. Erik; Starks, Glenn L. (2011). Historically Black Colleges and Universities: An Encyclopedia. ABC-CLIO. ISBN 9780313394164.
- Brooks, Dianne (2002). "'They Dig Her Message': Opera, Television, and the Black Diva". In Jenkins, Henry; Shattuc, Jane; McPherson, Tara (eds.). Hop on Pop: The Politics and Pleasures of Popular Culture. Duke University Press. ISBN 9780822327370.
- Cairns, David (1988). "Berlioz". In Blyth, Alan (ed.). Song on Record 2. Cambridge University Press. ISBN 9780521027984.
- Chotzinoff, Samuel (1964). A Little Nightmusic: Intimate Conversations with Jascha Heifetz, Vladimir Horowitz, Gian Carlo Menotti, Leontyne Price, Richard Rodgers, Artur Rubinstein, Andrés Segovia. Harper & Row.
- Chusid, Martin (2012). Verdi's Il Trovatore: The Quintessential Italian Melodrama. University of Rochester Press. ISBN 9781580464222.
- Commire, Anne; Klezmer, Deborah, eds. (1999). "Price, Leontyne". Women in World History: A Biographical Encyclopedia. Women in World History: A Biographical Encyclopedia: O-Q. Vol. XII. Yorkin Publications. ISBN 9780787664367.
- Davis, Peter G. (1999). The American Opera Singer: The Lives and Adventures of America's Great Singers in Opera and Concert from 1825 to the Present. Anchor Books.
- Dietz, Dan (2014). The Complete Book of 1950s Broadway Musicals. Rowman & Littlefield. ISBN 9781442235052.
- Domingo, Plácido (1983). My First Forty Years. Alfred A. Knopf. ISBN 0394523296.
- Driscoll, F. Paul (n.d.). "Leontyne Price". Opera News. Archived from the original on October 1, 2019.
- Evans, David Trevor (1999). Phantasmagoria: A Sociology of Opera. Routledge. ISBN 9781857422092.
- Flury, Roger (2012). Giacomo Puccini: A Discography. Scarecrow Press. ISBN 9780810883291.
- Giroud, Vincent (2015). Nicolas Nabokov: A Life in Freedom and Music. Oxford University Press. ISBN 9780199399895.
- Gill, Glenda E. (2000). "Leontyne Price". No Surrender! No Retreat! African-American Pioneer Performers of 20th Century American Theater. Palgrave Macmillan. ISBN 9780312217570.
- Goulding, Phil G. (2011). Ticket to the Opera: Discovering and Exploring 100 Famous Works, History, Lore, and Singers, with Recommended Recordings. Fawcett Books. ISBN 9780307761842.
- Heinemann, Sue (1996). Timelines of American Women's History. Berkley Publishing Group. ISBN 9780399519864.
- Heyman, Barbara B. (1995), Samuel Barber: The Composer and His Music, Oxford and New York: Oxford University Press, ISBN 0-19-509058-6
- Heyman, Barbara B. (2012). Samuel Barber: A Thematic Catalogue of the Complete Works. Oxford University Press. ISBN 9780199744640.
- Kirk, Elise K. (2004). "Price, Leontyne". In Higginbotham, Evelyn Brooks; Gates, Henry Louis; Gates Jr., Henry Louis (eds.). African American Lives. Oxford University Press. ISBN 9780199882861.
- Lyman, Darryl (2005). Great African American Women. Jonathan David. ISBN 0-8246-0459-8.
- Lyon, Hugh Lee (1973). Leontyne Price: Highlights of a Prima Donna. New York: Vantage Press. (republished in 2006 by Authors Choice Press)
- Magill, Frank N., ed. (2013). "Leontyne Price". The 20th Century O-Z: Dictionary of World Biography. Dictionary of World Biography: The 20th Century O-Z. Vol. IX. Taylor & Francis. ISBN 9781136593697.
- McCants, Clyde T. (2004). "Leontyne Price (1927– )". American Opera Singers and Their Recordings: Critical Commentaries and Discographies. McFarland & Company. ISBN 9780786419524.
- Nettles, Darryl Glenn (2003). "Leontyne Price (1927-)". African American Concert Singers Before 1950. McFarland & Company. ISBN 9780786414673.
- Noonan, Ellen (2012). The Strange Career of Porgy and Bess: Race, Culture, and America's Most Famous Opera. University of North Carolina Press. ISBN 9780807837337.
- O'Neil, Thomas (1999). The Grammys. Perigee Books. ISBN 9780399524776.
- Pollack, Howard (2023). Samuel Barber: His Life and Legacy. Urbana: University of Illinois Press. ISBN 978-0-252-04490-8.
- Riding, Alan; Dunton-Downer, Leslie (2022). Opera: The Definitive Illustrated History. Penguin Random House. ISBN 9780744056310.
- Rusak, Helen (2023). Women, Music and Leadership. Routledge. doi:10.4324/9781003183631. ISBN 9781003183631.
- Rushmore, Robert (1984). The Singing Voice. Dembner Books. ISBN 9780934878500.
- Sewell, George Alexander; Dwight, Margaret L. (1984). "Leontyne Price: Diva". Mississippi Black History Makers. University Press of Mississippi. ISBN 9781617034282.
- Smith, Danyel (2023). Shine Bright: A Very Personal History of Black Women in Pop. Random House Publishing Group. ISBN 9780593132739.
- Steins, Richard (1993). Leontyne Price: Opera Superstar. Blackbirch Press. ISBN 978-0516435312.
- Stohrer, Sharon L. (2014). The Singer's Companion. Taylor & Francis. ISBN 9781317958178.
- Story, Rosalyn M. (1990). And So I Sing: African-American Divas of Opera and Concert. Amistad. ISBN 978-0-446-71016-9.
- Thompson, Clifford, ed. (1999). Contemporary World Musicians. Routledge. doi:10.4324/9781315062419. ISBN 9781135939618.
- Thurman, Kira (2021). Singing Like Germans: Black Musicians in the Land of Bach, Beethoven, and Brahms. Ithaca: Cornell University Press. ISBN 9781501759840.
- Vishnevskaya, Galina (1984). Galina: A Russian Story. Harvest/Harcourt Brace Jovanovich. ISBN 9780151342501.
- Wearing, J. P. (2014). The London Stage 1950–1959: A Calendar of Productions, Performers, and Personnel. Rowman & Littlefield. ISBN 9780810893085.
- Wild, David (2007). And the Grammy Goes To...: The Official Story of Music's Most Coveted Award. State Street Press/ National Academy of Recording Arts & Sciences. ISBN 9781437971880.
- Wlaschin, Ken (2006). Encyclopedia of American opera. McFarland & Company. ISBN 0786421096.
