= David Garvey =

American pianist and academic

- Born: March 13, 1922; Reading, Pennsylvania
- Died: February 14, 1995 (aged 72); New York City
- Education: Juilliard School
- Occupations: Pianist; Academic
- Organization: University of Texas at Austin

David William Garvey (March 13, 1922 – February 14, 1995) was an American pianist and academic. He is known as the regular accompanist of Leontyne Price and other performers, including violinists Itzhak Perlman, Michael Rabin and Wanda Wiłkomirska.

== Career ==
Born in Reading, Pennsylvania, he studied at the Juilliard School with Beveridge Webster, graduating in 1948. He met Leontyne Price there, and began in 1953 to perform with her regularly on tours abroad and in the White House. In concerts with her, he was announced as pianist, not as accompanist.

He also collaborated with singers William Blankenship, Elizabeth Mannion, Mary O'Hara, Lucia Popp, Hermann Prey, and Jennie Tourel, and with violinists Joseph Fuchs, Itzhak Perlman, Michael Rabin, Charles Treger, and Wanda Wiłkomirska, among others.

Garvey taught at the University of Texas at Austin from 1976. He died in New York City.

== Recordings ==
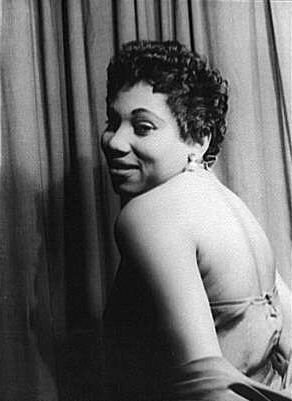
Leontyne Price in 1953, when they met

Garvey recorded the three Violin Sonatas by Frederick Delius with Wanda Wiłkomirska in 1987. A review in Gramophone noted that their rendition was the best of this music until then, saying: "Both ... have the secret of preserving the music's heartbeat and keeping it moving forward, no matter how slow the tempo might be, and however flexibly they may phrase within a basic pulse."

A recording of the first recital that Leontyne Price gave at Carnegie Hall on 28 February 1965 was issued first in 2002, and reviewed as exceptional. The program included a variety of styles, mostly unfamiliar repertory: arias from operas by Handel, Giordano, Puccini and Cilea, songs by Johannes Brahms, Francis Poulenc, Samuel Barber and Lee Hoiby, spirituals and Gershwin's "Summertime". While a reviewer described the singer's part in detail, he summarily acknowledged that "Miss Price is sensitively accompanied throughout by David Garvey – a true musical partnership, this".
