= Camellia Johnson =

American opera soprano (1953–2015)

- Born: September 20, 1953; Palatka, Florida, U.S.
- Died: August 26, 2015 (aged 61); Palatka, Florida
- Occupation: Classical soprano
- Organizations: Metropolitan Opera

Camellia Johnson (September 15, 1953 – August 26, 2015) was an American concert and opera singer. She began her career performing works from the mezzo-soprano repertoire, but after encouragement from the staff at the Metropolitan Opera retrained her voice as a soprano. She successfully made that transition after winning the Young Concert Artists competition in 1993. She went on to perform as a leading soprano with orchestras and opera companies internationally.

== Life and career ==
Born in Palatka, Florida, Johnson was the daughter of Bernice Baker and Emmanuel Johnson. She graduated from Central Academy High School in Palatka. She earned a Bachelor of Music degree from Bethune–Cookman University and a Master of Music degree from the Manhattan School of Music before winning a study grant from the Richard Tucker Music Foundation in 1990.

Johnson made her professional debut at the Metropolitan Opera on November 20, 1985 as Lily in Gershwin's Porgy and Bess conducted by William Vendice. She returned to the Met for more than 50 more performances over the next decade in roles like Serena in Porgy and Bess, the High Priestess in Aida, and Madelon in Andrea Chénier. Her last performance at the Met was in 1994 as the High Priestess.

In 1986, Johnson made her European debut at the Glyndebourne Festival Opera as the Strawberry Woman in Trevor Nunn's critically acclaimed production of Porgy and Bess; a role she recorded with that company two years later. That same year, she was a featured soloist in a concert of spirituals for Symphony Space. In 1987, she portrayed Mama McCourt in The Ballad of Baby Doe for the Bronx Opera. In 1989, she performed the role of Mrs. Nolan in Menotti's The Medium and was the mezzo-soprano soloist in the Verdi Requiem, both for Opera Ebony. She repeated the role of the Strawberry Woman at the Finnish National Opera in 1989 and 1992.

In 1990, Johnson was a soloist with The Harlem Spiritual Ensemble at a concert for Martin Luther King Jr. Day at the Cathedral of St. John the Divine. That same year she portrayed Mrs. Noye in Britten's Noye's Fludde for the Piccolo Teatro Dell Opera, and performed the Romanze from Franz Schubert's Rosamunde at the Mostly Mozart Festival at Avery Fisher Hall. In 1992, she made her debut at the San Francisco Opera as the Celestial Voice in Verdi's Don Carlos, performed Strauss' Four Last Songs with the Greater Bridgeport Symphony, and performed the aria "Care salve" from Handel's Atalanta in concert with the Brooklyn Philharmonic.

In 1993, Johnson performed the title role in Verdi's Aida at the Michigan Opera Theater, returned to the Mostly Mozart Festival to perform Beethoven's Ah! perfido under the baton of John Nelson at Lincoln Center, and sang both Ave Maria and The Lord's Prayer for the wedding of Donald Trump and Marla Maples. That same year she won the Young Concert Artists competition, which led to her New York recital debut at the 92nd Street Y on March 29, 1994. In his review of her performance, music critic Bernard Holland wrote "Adding Ms. Johnson up, one arrives at a powerful voice, trueness of intonation, musicality, taste and an impressive endurance. In conglomerate these qualities certainly signal a future of some proportions, maybe even a new Isolde."

In 1994, Johnson made her debut with Opera Pacific in the title role of Verdi's Aida, a role which she also performed for her debuts at the Atlanta Opera and Mobile Opera in 1995. Engagements with major orchestras soon followed over the next two years, including performances with the Baltimore Symphony Orchestra, Chicago Symphony Orchestra, the Detroit Symphony Orchestra, and the London Symphony Orchestra.

In the late 1990s, Johnson appeared in several concerts with the Florida Philharmonic Orchestra, including performing as the soprano soloist in Beethoven's Symphony No. 9, Barber's Knoxville: Summer of 1915, and Bernstein's Jeremiah Symphony among others. In 1997, she sang Aida to Fabio Armiliato's Radames in a return to the Michigan Opera Theatre. In 1998, she sang the role of Serena to Kevin Deas' Porgy with the New York Philharmonic under conductor Bobby McFerrin.

In 2000, Johnson sang the role of Bess to Terry Cook's Porgy in a concert performance of the opera with the Czech Philharmonic. In 2001, she was a featured soloist in Lincoln Center's American Songbook series at Alice Tully Hall singing music by Ricky Ian Gordon. In 2002, she performed the role of Dido in Purcell's Dido and Aeneas with the Gotham Chamber Opera. In 2005, she sang for Donald Trump's wedding to Melania Trump. In 2006, she performed Strauss' Four Last Songs for performances with the Royal Ballet Sinfonia in London. In 2007 she performed Samuel Barber's Prayers of Kierkegaard with the Oregon Symphony.

Johnson died of heart failure in Palatka, Florida, in 2015 at the age of 61. She had returned to her home town previously to take care of her aging mother. Other organizations with whom she performed as a guest artist during her career were the St. Louis Symphony Orchestra and the Indianapolis Symphony. She also sang at the White House for presidents Bill Clinton and Barack Obama.

== Recordings ==
- Porgy and Bess (Glyndebourne album) (1989, EMI Classics)
- Christmas with Paul Plishka (1995/2004, Naxos Records)
- Benjamin Britten; Choral Works and Operas for Children; Noye's Fludde, Op.59; The Chester Miracle Play set to music: Now forty dayes are fullie gone (2013, Warner Classics)
