= Lois McDonall =

Canadian operatic soprano (born 1939)

Lois Jeanette McDonall CM (born February 7, 1939) is a Canadian operatic soprano, especially known for her performances in the operas of Mozart and Donizetti.

She was appointed as a Member of the Order of Canada in 2023. She currently resides in Niagara-on-the-Lake, Ontario.

== Early life and education ==
Lois McDonall was born in Larkspur, Alberta. She began her vocal training in Edmonton with Eileen McEcheran, and also studied with Glyndwr Jones in Vancouver. After winning the Metropolitan Opera National Council Auditions in Seattle, Washington, Ms. McDonall was encouraged to seek a career in opera. On the recommendation of Irving Gutmann, she was connected with the University of Toronto where she studied with Irene Jessner, Herman Geiger-Torel and Jacqueline Richard.

== Career ==
Lois McDonall made her Canadian Opera Company debut between 1967-9. Her early roles included: Susanna in Ermanno Wolf-Ferrari Il segreto di Susanna and Kate Pinkerton in Puccini's Madame Butterfly. She then went on to the Stadische Buhren in Flensburg, Germany where she played the demanding title role in Puccini's Tosca and Elsa in Wagner's Lohengrin.

In 1970, McDonall became a resident artist at the Sadler's Wells Opera (now the English National Opera). She appeared on short notice in the title role of Handel's Semele when the lead soprano became ill during the first act. During that season, McDonall sang many performances of Constanze in The Abduction from the Seraglio by Mozart. In following seasons she performed Fiordiligi from Così fan tutte, the Countess in Le nozze di Figaro, Roselinda in Die Fledermaus, Antonia in The Tales of Hoffmann, Leonora in Il trovatore, Freia in Das Rheingold, Hanna in The Merry Widow, the title role in Massenet's Manon, Marschallin in Der Rosenkavalier, Violetta in La traviata, Miss Jessel in The Turn of the Screw and she created the title role in Iain Hamilton's Anna Karenina.

Ms. McDonall spent 14 years as a resident artist with the English National Opera. In addition to her tenure at the ENO, Ms. McDonall made appearances at the Scottish Opera, the Welsh National Opera, Opera North and the Royal Opera House, Covent Garden, where she made her debut in 1975 in Richard Strauss' Die Frau ohne Schatten. She gave performances in Canada in the 1974 Festival Canada as the Countess and in 1975 with the COC in Die Fledermaus and Donna Anna in Don Giovanni at the Edmonton Opera in 1977. Ms. McDonall returned to live in Canada in 1984 and appeared as the Countess in The Marriage of Figaro at the Hamilton Opera. In 1988, she sang the title role in Fedora with "Opera in Concert". She also sang in the COC's production of Andrea Chénier in 1989.

Ms. McDonall has worked tirelessly in the years since her return to Canada to prepare young Canadian singers for their own careers in opera and classical music. She teaches now for the joy of watching students progress and achieve their dreams.

On December 28, 2023, Ms. McDonall’s efforts in support of Canadian opera - both singing and teaching - were officially recognized by the Governor General of Canada with her advancement as a Member of the Order of Canada. The award appropriately recognizes Ms. McDonall’s diligence and determination in overcoming the challenges which naturally arise from emanating from a remote Canadian pioneering farm community. It acknowledges the brilliance of her career despite those challenges.

== Operatic roles ==
Lois McDonall has performed over 40 principal roles. Some of these roles include:

- Miss Jessel, The Turn of the Screw (Britten)
- Maria Padilla, Maria Padilla (Donizetti)
- Anna Karenina, Anna Karenina (Hamilton)
- Semele, Semele (Handel)
- Hanna, The Merry Widow (Lehár)
- Manon, Manon (Massenet)
- Mrs Medlock, The Secret Garden (Stephen McNeff)
- Donna Anna, Don Giovanni (Mozart)
- Fiordiligi, Così fan tutte (Mozart)
- Constanze, Die Entführung aus dem Serail (Mozart)
- The Countess, The Marriage of Figaro (Mozart)
- Stella, The Tales of Hoffmann (Offenbach)
- Giulletta, The Tales of Hoffmann (Offenbach)
- Antonia, The Tales of Hoffmann (Offenbach)
- Musetta, La Bohème (Puccini)
- Kate Pinkerton, Madama Butterfly (Puccini)
- Tosca, Tosca (Puccini)
- Rosalinda, Die Fledermaus (Strauss)
- Arabella, Arabella (Strauss)
- Marschallin, Der Rosenkavalier (Strauss)
- Leonora, Il Trovatore (Verdi)
- Amelia, Simon Boccanegra (Verdi)
- Violetta, La Traviata (Verdi)
- Elsa, Lohengrin (Wagner)
- Freia, Das Rheingold (Wagner)
- The Old Maid, The Old Maid and the Thief (Menotti)
- The Witch, Hansel and Gretel (Engelbert Humperdinck)

== Iain Hamilton and other contemporary music premieres ==
Lois McDonall has premiered the works of several composers. Among these, most notably is the British Composer, Iain Hamilton. He wrote a few pieces specifically for her voice. These include the opera Anna Karenina, which was commissioned by the English National Opera in 1978; the Passion According to St. Mark, commissioned by the London Chorale in 1982; and Cleopatra, a dramatic Scena for Soprano which was premiered by the BBC Symphony Orchestra at the 1978 Proms. Lois McDonall also created the role of Mrs. Medlock in Stephen McNeff's The Secret Garden for the COMUS Music Theatre in 1985.

== Teaching career ==
Lois McDonall has taught at The Banff Centre in Alberta. She taught at the Royal Conservatory of Music in Toronto from 1986–1992 and taught at the University of Toronto until 2001. Now-prominent students include soprano Othalie Graham, Jackalyn Short, Elliot Madore, Stephen Harland, and Andrea Ludwig. Today Lois McDonall is retired and lives in Toronto Ontario, Canada. She is a prolific composer and teaches piano to youth and Opera.

== Recordings ==
These are McDonall's recordings:

- Margot le Rouge (Delius), BBC
- Ariodante (Handel), BBC
- The Merry Widow (Lehár), BBC
- Don Sanche (Liszt), BBC
- Rienzi, (Wagner), BBC
- Der Protagonist (Weill), BBC
- Das Rheingold (Wagner), EMI
- Maria Padilla (Donizetti), Opera Rara
- Les Martyrs (Donizetti), House of Opera
