= Distant Light (Renée Fleming album) =

Studio album by Renée Fleming
- Released: January 20, 2017
- Recorded: February 10–13, 2016
- Venues: Konserthuset, Stockholm, Sweden
- Genre: Classical
- Length: 53:24
- Label: Decca

Renée Fleming chronology
Christmas in New York (2014)	Distant Light (2017)	Broadway (2018)

Distant Light is an album by American soprano Renée Fleming. It was released on January 20, 2017, by Decca Records.

== Critical reception ==
Richard Morrison of The Times described Distant Light as an "ambitious album" featuring "superbly reimagined arrangements" by Hans Ek that "show how much stylistic overlap exists between experimental pop and postmodern classical". Gulf News described Barber's "Knoxville: Summer of 1915" as "a perfect fit for Fleming's silvery, soaring soprano". They also noted the "textured, emotional soundscape" of Hillborg's The Strand Settings and the "contemporary" sound of Björk's songs. Alexandra Coghlan of Limelight magazine stated that the album plays out like "a coherent and convincing recital programme" that "quietly dissolves divisions between genres to rather wonderful effect".

David Patrick Stearns of Gramophone magazine described Distant Light as a "haphazard" collection of music, where Barber and Björk struggle to sit alongside Hillborg's song cycle. Associated Press opined that Fleming's performance of "Knoxville: Summer of 1915" was "long overdue" but "misses the mark" due to conductor Sakari Oramo's "inconsistent" tempo and phrasing.

== Track listing ==
1. "Knoxville: Summer of 1915, Op. 24" (Samuel Barber) – 15:29
2. "The Strand Settings: 1. Black Sea" (Anders Hillborg) – 4:17
3. "The Strand Settings: 2. Dark Harbor XX" (Hillborg) – 5:08
4. "The Strand Settings: 3. Dark Harbor XXXV" (Hillborg) – 5:25
5. "The Strand Settings: 4. Dark Harbor XI" (Hillborg) – 5:40
6. "Virus" (Björk, Sjón) – 4:19
7. "Jóga" (Björk, Sjón) – 4:32
8. "All Is Full of Love" (Björk) – 3:12
9. "Undo" (Björk, Thomas Knak) – 5:17

== Charts ==
Chart performance for Distant Light
Chart (2017)	Peak position
UK Classical Artist Albums Chart (OCC)	4
US Top Classical Albums (Billboard)	17
