= Piccolo Teatro =

Piccolo Teatro. (meaning Little Theatre), is the name of several theatres:

- Piccolo Teatro (Milan)
- Piccolo Teatro Dell Opera, New York City
- Teatro Piccolo (Rome)
- Piccolo Teatro (Rufina)
