= Chris Nance =

American conductor and music educator (1940–2014)

Chris Nance (October 12, 1940, Charlottesville, Virginia — October 27, 2014, New York City) was an American conductor and music educator. Primarily active as an opera conductor, he served on the conducting staff of the New York City Opera from 1969-1974 and was the music administrator and conductor of the Houston Grand Opera from 1974-1977. Thereafter he worked as a freelance conductor with opera companies throughout the world. He became particularly associated with George Gershwin's Porgy and Bess for which he was frequently hired to conduct at opera houses both in the United States and abroad.

== Life and career ==
Born in Charlottesville, Virginia, Nance earned a bachelor of music degree from the University of Southern California in 1963 where he was a conducting pupil of Ingolf Dahl. He then joined the music faculty at Louisiana State University where he taught from 1963–1969. He left that position to pursue summer graduate studies in conducting under Walter Ducloux at the University of Texas at Austin where he earned a master's degree in 1972.

While a student at the University of Texas at Austin, Nance began his conducting career as the chorus master at the New York City Opera from 1969-1974. In 1970 he began taking on conducting assignments at the NYCO, beginning with Rigoletto. Over the next four years he led performances of Carmen, Cavalleria Rusticana, La Traviata, Lucia di Lammermoor, Madama Butterfly, and Pagliacci. In 1974 he left the NYCO to become the music administrator and conductor of the Houston Grand Opera. He notably led performances of the lauded 1976 HGO productions of George Gershwin's Porgy and Bess and Scott Joplin's Treemonisha; taking both shows on National tours.

Nance left the HGO in 1977 and began working as a freelance conductor on the international stage. Porgy and Bess became a calling card of his, with him leading performances of the work at the Calgary Opera, the Cologne Opera, the Dutch National Opera, the Florentine Opera, the Leipzig Opera, the Prinzregententheater in Munich, Teatro dell'Opera di Roma, the Teatro Lirico Giuseppe Verdi in Trieste, the Teatro Municipale in Reggio Emilia, Theater am Goetheplatz in Bremen, the Théâtre du Châtelet in Paris, the Tokyo Bunka Kaikan, the Tulsa Opera, the Vienna State Opera, and the Zurich Opera among others.

In 1983 Nance made his conducting debut with the Los Angeles Opera, leading the United States premiere of Iain Hamilton’s Anna Karenina. He conducted that work again in 1985 for his debut with the English National Opera. That same year he conducted the world premiere performance of Hamilton’s Lancelot at the Arundel Festival.

In 1989 Nance returned to the NYCO as a freelancer after a long absence, leading the company in performances of La Bohème that included Renée Fleming in her debut role with the company as Mimi. He worked for the company on several more productions over the next three years, including conducting performances of Kurt Weil's Street Scene (1990), Gilbert and Sullivan's The Mikado (1990), Frank Loesser's The Most Happy Fella (1991) and Sigmund Romberg's The Desert Song (1992).

Nance also enjoyed lengthy and fruitful associations freelance conducting with the Cincinnati Opera, New Orleans Opera Association, Hawaii Opera Theatre and Opera Grand Rapids. Other companies he conducted for during his career include the Pittsburgh Opera, the Palacio de Bellas Artes in Mexico City and at the San Antonio Opera among others. He died in New York City in 2014 at the age of 74.
