= Anna Karenina (Hamilton) =

Hamilton opera by Iain Hamilton

Anna Karenina is an opera in three acts by Scottish composer Iain Hamilton. The libretto, based on Leo Tolstoy's 1877 novel, Anna Karenina was written by the composer. Anna Karenina was premiered on May 7, 1981, at the London Coliseum by the English National Opera in a performance conducted by Howard Williams with Lois McDonall in the title role. The director was Colin Graham and the designers were Ralph Koltai and Annena Stubbs. Its running time is approximately two and a quarter hours.

== Background and performance history ==
Anna Karenina was the fifth of Hamilton's ten operas. Conrad Wilson in his 2000 obituary for the composer wrote that "inside Hamilton there was always a romantic composer struggling to get out ... it finally exploded in Anna Karenina, a poignantly Mahlerian treatment of Tolstoy's novel." Hamilton composed Anna Karenina, a commission from English National Opera, in 1978, and published the score in 1979. It was first staged on May 7, 1981, by ENO in a production directed by Colin Graham with sets by Ralph Koltai and costumes by Anena Stubbs. Anna Karenina had its American premiere on March 16, 1983, at the Wilshire Ebell Theatre in Los Angeles and ran for three nights under the baton of Chris Nance. It was staged by the now defunct Los Angeles Opera Theatre in a production using screen projections as backdrops rather than traditional sets. It is not known whether the opera has had any subsequent performances. The American composer David Carlson also wrote an opera, premiered in 2007, based on the Tolstoy's novel; the libretto of his Anna Karenina was written by Colin Graham, the director of the 1981 production of Hamilton's version.

== Roles ==
Roles, voice types, premiere cast
Role	Voice type	Premiere cast, 7 May 1981 (Conductor: Howard Williams)
Anna Karenina	soprano	Lois McDonall
Alexei Karenin, her husband	baritone	Geoffrey Chard
Count Alexei Vronsky, her lover	tenor	Geoffrey Pogson
Stiva, her brother	baritone	Alan Opie
Dolly, Stiva's wife	mezzo-soprano	Della Jones
Kitty, Stiva's sister-in-law	soprano	Janis Kelly
Countess Vronskaya, Vronsky's mother	soprano	Ava June
Prince Yashvin, Vronsky's friend	baritone	Malcolm Rivers
Countess Betsy	mezzo-soprano	Katherine Pring
Countess Lydia	mezzo-soprano	Shelagh Squires
Landau, a French clairvoyant	tenor	Stuart Kale

== Orchestration ==
- Voice: 4 sopranos, 2 mezzo-sopranos, 1 alto, 2 tenors, 3 baritones, 2 basses, boy soprano, SATB Chorus
- Instruments: 2 flutes, 2 oboes, 2 clarinets, 2 bassoons, 4 horns, 3 trumpets, 3 trombones, 1 tuba, timpani, 2 percussionists, harp, strings.
