= Scottish Dances (Hamilton) =

Composition by Iain Hamilton

Scottish Dances, op. 32 is a composition by the Scottish composer Iain Hamilton.

It is scored for full orchestra, runs for around sixteen minutes and is in five short movements:

1. Allegro molto
2. Andante comodo
3. Vivace
4. Lento semplice
5. Presto

Hamilton uses several traditional Scottish folk tunes, including "Caller Herrin'", "Duncan Gray", "Oh, whistle and I'll come to you, my lad", "My love she's but a lassie yet", "The Lea-rig" and "Gin where Gaddie rins" (also known as "Back o' Bennachie"). Several have been set to words by Robert Burns.

It shares similarities in structure with Malcolm Arnold's Four Scottish Dances and both were commissioned by the BBC for a festival of light music. It was premiered on St Andrew's Day in 1956, although does not appear to have been broadcast at the time. The first live broadcast performance was given by the BBC Symphony Orchestra under Stanford Robinson at the BBC Proms in 1960. It was later recorded by the Scottish National Orchestra under Alexander Gibson and much later by the Sinfonia of London conducted by John Wilson.
