= Renée Fleming =

American soprano

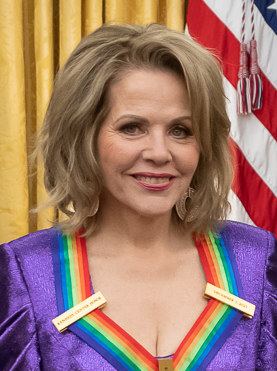
- Fleming in 2023 at the White House Oval Office
- Born: February 14, 1959 (age 67); Indiana, Pennsylvania, U.S.
- Education: State University of New York, Potsdam (BM); Eastman School of Music, University of Rochester (MM); Juilliard School (GrDip)
- Occupations: Singer (lyric soprano), actress, arts advocate
- Years active: 1978-present
- Spouses: Rick Ross (m. 1989; div. 2000) Tim Jessell (m. 2011)
- Children: 2
- Website: reneefleming.com

Renée Lynn Fleming (born February 14, 1959) is an American soprano and actress, known for performances in opera, concerts, recordings, theater, film, and at major public occasions. A recipient of the National Medal of Arts, Fleming has been nominated for 18 Grammy Awards and has won five times. In December 2023, she was one of five recipients of the Kennedy Center Honors. Other notable honors have included the Crystal Award from the World Economic Forum in Davos, the Chevalier de la Légion d'Honneur from the French government, Germany's Cross of the Order of Merit, Sweden's Polar Music Prize and honorary membership in England's Royal Academy of Music. Unusual among artists whose careers began in opera, Fleming has achieved name recognition beyond the classical music world.

Fleming has a full lyric soprano voice. She has performed coloratura, lyric, and lighter spinto soprano operatic roles in Italian, German, French, Czech, and Russian, aside from her native English. A significant portion of her career has been the performance of new music, including world premieres of operas, concert pieces, and songs composed for her by André Previn, Caroline Shaw, Kevin Puts, Anders Hillborg, Nico Muhly, Henri Dutilleux, Brad Mehldau, and Wayne Shorter. In 2008, Fleming became the first woman in the 125-year history of the Metropolitan Opera (the Met) to solo headline a season opening night gala. Conductor Sir Georg Solti said of Fleming: "In my long life, I have met maybe two sopranos with this quality of singing."

Beyond opera, Fleming has sung and recorded lieder, chansons, jazz, musical theatre, and indie rock, and she has performed with a wide range of artists, including Luciano Pavarotti, Lou Reed, Wynton Marsalis, Paul Simon, Andrea Bocelli, Sting, John Prine, Joe Jackson and Dead & Company. A 2018 Tony Award nominee, Fleming has acted on Broadway and in theatrical productions in London, Los Angeles and Chicago. Fleming has also recorded songs for the soundtracks of several major films, two of which won the Academy Award for Best Picture (The Shape of Water and The Lord of the Rings: The Return of the King). Fleming has made numerous television appearances, and she is the only classical singer to have performed the US National Anthem at the Super Bowl. In July 2025, she made her directing debut with a production of Mozart's Così fan tutte at the Aspen Music Festival and School.

Fleming is a prominent advocate for awareness of the impact of music and the creative arts on health and neuroscience, winning a Research!America award for Impact on Public Opinion. In May 2023, Fleming was appointed by the World Health Organization as a Goodwill Ambassador for Arts and Health. In 2024, she launched the Renée Fleming Neuroarts Investigator Awards in partnership with the NeuroArts Blueprint Initiative at Johns Hopkins University and the Aspen Institute. Presented annually, the grants fund interdisciplinary research by early career scientists in collaboration with arts practitioners. In April 2024, Penguin Random House published Fleming's anthology Music and Mind: Harnessing the Arts for Health and Wellness. In January 2025, Fleming was appointed as an inaugural member of the World Economic Forum Global Arts and Culture Council.

== Early life and education ==
Fleming was born on February 14, 1959, in Indiana, Pennsylvania, the daughter of two music teachers. She has great-grandparents who were born in Prague and later emigrated to the US. She grew up in Churchville, New York and attended Churchville-Chili High School.

She studied with Patricia Misslin at the Crane School of Music at the State University of New York (SUNY) at Potsdam, and graduated with a Bachelor of Music Education in 1981. While at SUNY Potsdam, Fleming took up singing with a jazz trio at Alger's, an off-campus bar. The jazz saxophonist Illinois Jacquet invited her on tour with his big band, but she chose instead to continue with graduate studies with voice teacher John Maloy at the Eastman School of Music at the University of Rochester, from which she received a Master of Music in 1983. She portrayed Zerlina in Eastman's 1982 production of Don Giovanni led by conductor David Effron with a cast that also included Gene Scheer as Leporello and Mark Thomsen as Don Ottavio.

As a student, Fleming spent several summers at the Aspen Music Festival and School (AMFS), where she studied with Jan DeGaetani and was directed by Edward Berkeley. She appeared in the role of Anne Sexton in Conrad Susa's Transformations (1983); gave her first performance as Countess Almaviva in Mozart's The Marriage of Figaro (1984), the role in which she later made most of her major opera house debuts; and sang the role of Anne in Stravinsky's The Rake's Progress (1987). She also performed scenes from Der Rosenkavalier, and the Marschallin in that opera became one of her calling-card roles at opera houses around the globe.

She won a Fulbright Scholarship in 1985, which enabled her to work in Europe with Arleen Augér and Elisabeth Schwarzkopf. She also studied lieder with Hartmut Höll through this scholarship in Frankfurt, Germany. Fleming then sang at jazz clubs to pay for further studies at the Juilliard School. While at Juilliard, she sang in roles with the Juilliard Opera Center, appearing as Musetta in Puccini's La bohème and the Wife in Menotti's Tamu-Tamu, among others. Her voice teacher at Juilliard was Beverley Peck Johnson. She graduated from Juilliard with an Artist Diploma in 1986, and was among the first recipients of the Richard F. Gold Career Grant in 1987.

== Career ==
=== 1980s ===
Fleming began performing professionally in smaller concerts and with small opera companies while still a graduate student at Juilliard. She sang frequently in the Musica Viva concert series sponsored by the New York Unitarian Church of All Souls during the 1980s. In 1984 she sang nine songs by Hugo Wolf in the world premiere of Eliot Feld's ballet Adieu, which she again performed in 1987 and 1989 at the Joyce Theater. In 1986 she sang her first major operatic role, Konstanze in Die Entführung aus dem Serail, at the State Theatre in Salzburg, Austria. Two years later she portrayed Thalie, Clarine and La Folie in Jean-Philippe Rameau's Platée with Il Piccolo Teatro dell'Opera at the Brooklyn Academy of Music.

Her major break came in 1988 when she won the Met Auditions at age 29. That same year she sang the Countess in The Marriage of Figaro in her debut with Houston Grand Opera. She reprised the role the following year in her debut at the Spoleto Festival USA in Charleston, Sputh Carolina. Also in 1989, Fleming made her debut with the New York City Opera as Mimì in La bohème under conductor Chris Nance and her debut with The Royal Opera, London, as Dircé in Cherubini's Médée. She also was awarded a Richard Tucker Career Grant and won the George London Competition. In March 1989 she sang the role of Imogene in Vincenzo Bellini's Il pirata with the Opera Orchestra of New York under Eve Queler.

=== 1990s ===
In 1990 she was once again honored by the Richard Tucker Music Foundation but this time with the highly coveted Richard Tucker Award. That same year she made her debut with Seattle Opera in her first portrayal of the title role in Rusalka, a role that she has since recorded and reprised at many of the world's great opera houses. She also sang for the 50th anniversary of the American Ballet Theatre in their production of Eliot Feld's Les Noces and returned to the New York City Opera to sing both the Countess in Le nozze di Figaro and Micaëla in Bizet's Carmen. She sang the title role in the US premiere presentation of Donizetti's 1841 opera Maria Padilla with Opera Omaha. In addition, she sang the title role in Donizetti's Lucrezia Borgia with the Opera Orchestra of New York.

Fleming's first television appearance came in January 1991, singing the Cherry Duet from Mascagni's L'amico Fritz with Luciano Pavarotti on Live from Lincoln Center. Fleming made her Met and San Francisco Opera debut portraying Countess Almaviva in Le nozze di Figaro in 1991. She was originally not scheduled to make her Met debut until the following season, but stepped in to replace Felicity Lott who had become ill. She returned to the Met later that year to sing Rosina in the world premiere of John Corigliano's The Ghosts of Versailles. Continuing her progress, she made her Carnegie Hall debut performing music by Ravel with the New York City Opera Orchestra, sang Rusalka with Houston Grand Opera, and made her debut at the Tanglewood Music Festival as Ilia in Mozart's Idomeneo with Seiji Ozawa and the Boston Symphony Orchestra.

1992 saw Fleming making her debut with Grand Théâtre de Genève in Switzerland as Fiordiligi in Mozart's Così fan tutte, and she sang the role of Anna in Boieldieu's La dame blanche at Carnegie Hall with the Opera Orchestra of New York and the role of Fortuna in Mozart's Il sogno di Scipione at Alice Tully Hall, as part of Lincoln Center's Festival of Mozart Operas in Concert.

Fleming sang the role of Alaide in Bellini's La straniera in a concert performance by the Opera Orchestra of New York; made her debut at the Rossini Opera Festival in Italy in the title role of Rossini's Armida; and debuted with the Lyric Opera of Chicago in the title role of Carlisle Floyd's Susannah.

She also gave her New York City solo recital debut at Alice Tully Hall to great acclaim, sang her first Pamina in Mozart's The Magic Flute at the Met, and performed Alban Berg's "Three Excerpts from Wozzeck and the "Lulu Suite" with the Met Orchestra under James Levine.

The same season saw her singing in the world premiere of Joan Tower's Fanfare with Pinchas Zukerman and the Aspen Chamber Symphony and in the world premiere of John Kander's Letter From Sullivan Ballou at the Richard Tucker Awards ceremony.

In June 1993, Fleming performed recital pieces at the funeral of the American soprano Arleen Auger at Frank E. Campbell Funeral Chapel in New York City.

During the 1993/1994 season, Fleming sang her first Desdemona in Verdi's Otello and her first Ellen Orford in Britten's Peter Grimes, both with the Met. During the following summer, she made her debut at the Glyndebourne Festival in England as the Countess in Le nozze di Figaro. In addition, she performed the role of Madame de Tourvel in the world premiere of Conrad Susa's The Dangerous Liaisons. The 1994/1995 San Francisco Opera's season included her Salome in Massenet's Hérodiade.

In 1995 Fleming portrayed the Marschallin in Der Rosenkavalier with Houston Grand Opera; sang in Salomé in Massenet's Hérodiade with the Opera Orchestra of New York at Carnegie Hall; and sang Rusalka with the San Francisco Opera. Fiordiligi in Così fan tutte with Solti at Royal Festival Hall in London followed, as did a lauded recital at the Morgan Library.

A highlight of 1996 was her signing of an exclusive recording contract with the London/Decca label, making her the first American singer in 31 years to do so, the last having been Marilyn Horne.

The title role in Rossini's Armida at the Pesaro Festival in Italy also came in 1996. Fiordiligi in Così fan tutte at the Met followed, as did the soprano solo in the Verdi Requiem with Luciano Pavarotti and the Met Orchestra at Carnegie Hall. Her debut in the role of Marguerite in Gounod's Faust came with Chicago Lyric Opera, and she sang the role of Donna Anna in Mozart's Don Giovanni with the Paris Opera at the reopening of the Palais Garnier with Sir Georg Solti.

Solti chose Fleming to be the first recipient of his "Solti Prize", an award given to an outstanding younger singer, and given by the "Académie du disque lyrique" in a ceremony equivalent to the Grammy Awards. That year, Fleming debuted at the Bayreuth Festival in Germany as Eva in Wagner's Meistersinger. Her other performances included recitals at the Edinburgh International Festival in Scotland and at Alice Tully Hall.

Her first Manon at the Opéra Bastille in France received glowing reviews {{}} in 1997. At the Bastille, she also reprised the Marschallin in Der Rosenkavalier as well as singing Marguerite in Faust and Rusalka at the Met.

Two concert performances occurred: first with the New York Philharmonic, first under Zubin Mehta performing a selection of opera arias; the second singing Mozart's Exsultate, jubilate and three songs of Richard Strauss with Kurt Masur. She appeared at the Ravinia Festival with the Chicago Symphony Orchestra and performed Samuel Barber's Knoxville: Summer of 1915 with the Orchestra of St. Luke's under André Previn. She gave recitals as well at notable venues such as the Salzburg Festival in Austria.

Two title roles were offered to Fleming in 1998: Richard Strauss' Arabella with Houston Grand Opera and Carlisle Floyd's Susannah. Also, there was Countess Almaviva in a landmark production of Le nozze di Figaro at the Met which also starred Cecilia Bartoli, Susanne Mentzer, Dwayne Croft, Danielle de Niese, and Bryn Terfel and which was broadcast on PBS' Great Performances. She made her Carnegie Hall recital debut and sang Richard Strauss's Four Last Songs with Claudio Abbado and the Gustav Mahler Youth Orchestra at the Salzburg Festival. and later with the Berlin Philharmonic.

She originated the roles of Blanche DuBois in the world première of André Previn's A Streetcar Named Desire with the San Francisco Opera in September 1998.

1999 brought appearances at the Bavarian State Opera in Germany as the Marschallin in Der Rosenkavalier and she returned to Carnegie Hall to great success with a concert of German lieder. She also performed in recital with André Previn and made her debut at the Schleswig-Holstein Festival in Germany. Fleming's CD, The Beautiful Voice, won her a Grammy Award that year.

Performances of two new title roles were given: Handel's Alcina with Les Arts Florissants and conductor William Christie and with the Lyric Opera of Chicago and Charpentier's Louise with San Francisco Opera. Fleming closed out the year by performing for President Bill Clinton at the White House for a Christmas celebration.

=== 2000s ===
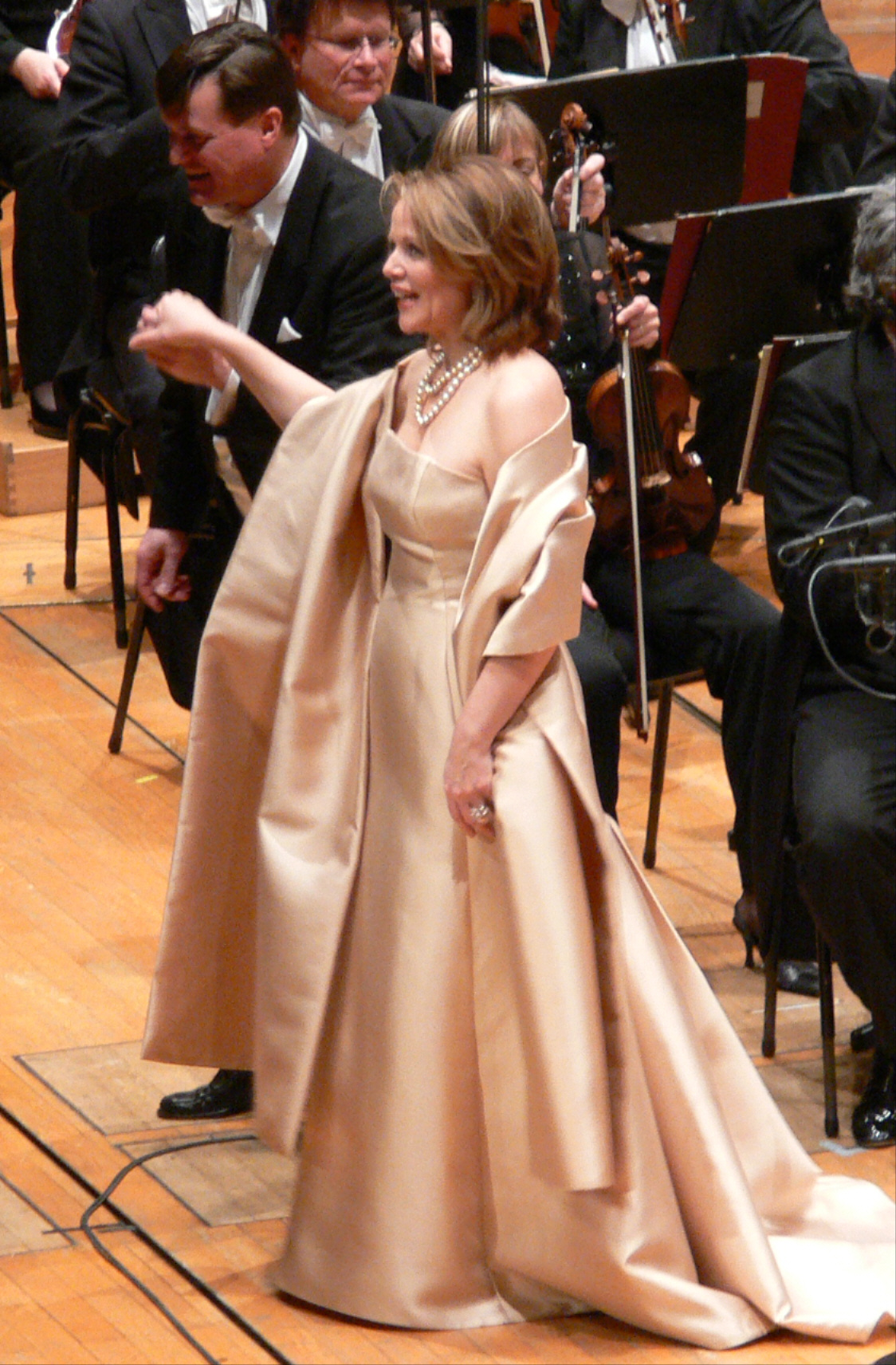
Fleming, April 2008

In 2000, Fleming appeared at the Met, San Francisco Opera and at Covent Garden in England as the Marschallin in Der Rosenkavalier and sang the title role in Donizetti's Lucrezia Borgia with the Opera Orchestra of New York.

She appeared as Donna Anna in Mozart's Don Giovanni at the Salzburg Festival and at the Met. She performed with the Orchestra of St. Luke's, under Mark Elder as part of the PBS series Live From Lincoln Center and with the Boston Symphony Orchestra in Haydn's Creation under James Levine. In June of that year she sang at the installation of New York Archbishop Edward Egan.

As Desdemona in Otello she opened the 2001/02 Lyric Opera of Chicago season, Manon with the Paris Opera, the Marschallin with both the San Francisco Opera and the Met, and Arabella at both the Bavarian State Opera in Germany and the Met. She also sang in Verdi's Requiem twice, once with the London Symphony Orchestra and once with the New York Philharmonic. Fleming also sang at World Trade Center site shortly after the September 11 attacks.

Taking a rather different approach, in 2002 Fleming provided the vocals for Howard Shore's soundtrack for The Lord of the Rings: The Return of the King soundtrack. Her singing can be found in the songs "The End of All Things", "Twilight and Shadow" and "The Return of the King" (Original Soundtrack) and "The Grace Of Undómiel", "Mount Doom", "The Eagles" and "The Fellowship Reunited" (The Complete Recordings). She also sang in several concerts in the United Kingdom with Bryn Terfel and gave the most extensive recital tour of her career, singing in dozens of recitals with pianist Jean-Yves Thibaudet throughout the United States, Europe, Australia, and Asia. In addition, she portrayed the role of Rusalka with Opéra Bastille and Imogene in Bellini's Il pirata with Théâtre du Châtelet in Paris.

Her career at the Met continued in 2003 with Imogene and Violetta in La traviata. She sang the title role in Massenet's Thaïs with the Lyric Opera of Chicago, in addition to Rusalka at Covent Garden and another Violetta with Houston Grand Opera. A reprise of Blanche in Previn's A Streetcar Named Desire took place at the Barbican Centre in London.

Met performances continued in 2004, with Fleming portraying Rodelinda in Handel's opera and reprises of Rusalka and Violetta at the Met. She also sang her first Countess in Capriccio at the Palais Garnier and performed in concerts with the Chicago Symphony Orchestra, the Philadelphia Orchestra, the Boston Symphony Orchestra, the Los Angeles Philharmonic, and the Toronto Symphony Orchestra among others. Recitals were given in Spain, Switzerland, Germany, Canada, and the United States and performed in several concerts with Elton John at Radio City Music Hall. Her first book, The Inner Voice: The Making of a Singer, was published in 2004 by the Penguin Group.

Massenet's Manon at the Met, Desdemona in Verdi's Otello at Covent Garden, and Thaïs in Vienna were part of her 2005 repertoire, in addition to concerts with the Berlin Philharmonic (Mahler's Symphony No. 4 and Alban Berg's Seven Early Songs, conducted by Claudio Abbado, and released as a live recording by Deutsche Grammophon), the London Symphony Orchestra, the Baltimore Symphony Orchestra, the New Jersey Symphony, the Rochester Philharmonic, and the Mormon Tabernacle Choir among several other ensembles.

In 2006, Fleming performed a solo concert at the Lyric Opera of Chicago with Sir Andrew Davis, sang Violetta in La traviata with Los Angeles Opera; returned to the Met to sing both Manon and Rodelinda; and took up Violetta in the Met's touring production to Japan. Several recitals and concerts throughout the United States, Italy, Russia, Sweden and Austria took place, the latter being a celebration of Mozart's 250th Birthday with the Vienna Philharmonic which was broadcast live internationally. She also recorded song cycles with pianist Brad Mehldau, which were released as Love Sublime.

Violetta reappeared the following year in Chicago; Tatyana in Eugene Onegin and Violetta were given at the Met; her Arabella was seen at the Zurich Opera, as was Thaïs at the Théâtre du Châtelet, The Royal Opera, London, in concert at the Vienna Konzerthaus, and the Liceu, Barcelona. Performances with over a dozen orchestras, including the Monte-Carlo Philharmonic Orchestra, the National Symphony Orchestra, the Vancouver Symphony, the Boston Symphony, the San Francisco Symphony, the China Philharmonic Orchestra, the Los Angeles Philharmonic, and the Baton Rouge Symphony Orchestra where she appeared as a Pennington Great Performers series artist. Additionally, Fleming appeared at numerous music festivals, including the Salzburg Festival and the Lincoln Center Festival and she gave recitals throughout Southeast Asia, Germany, and Switzerland.

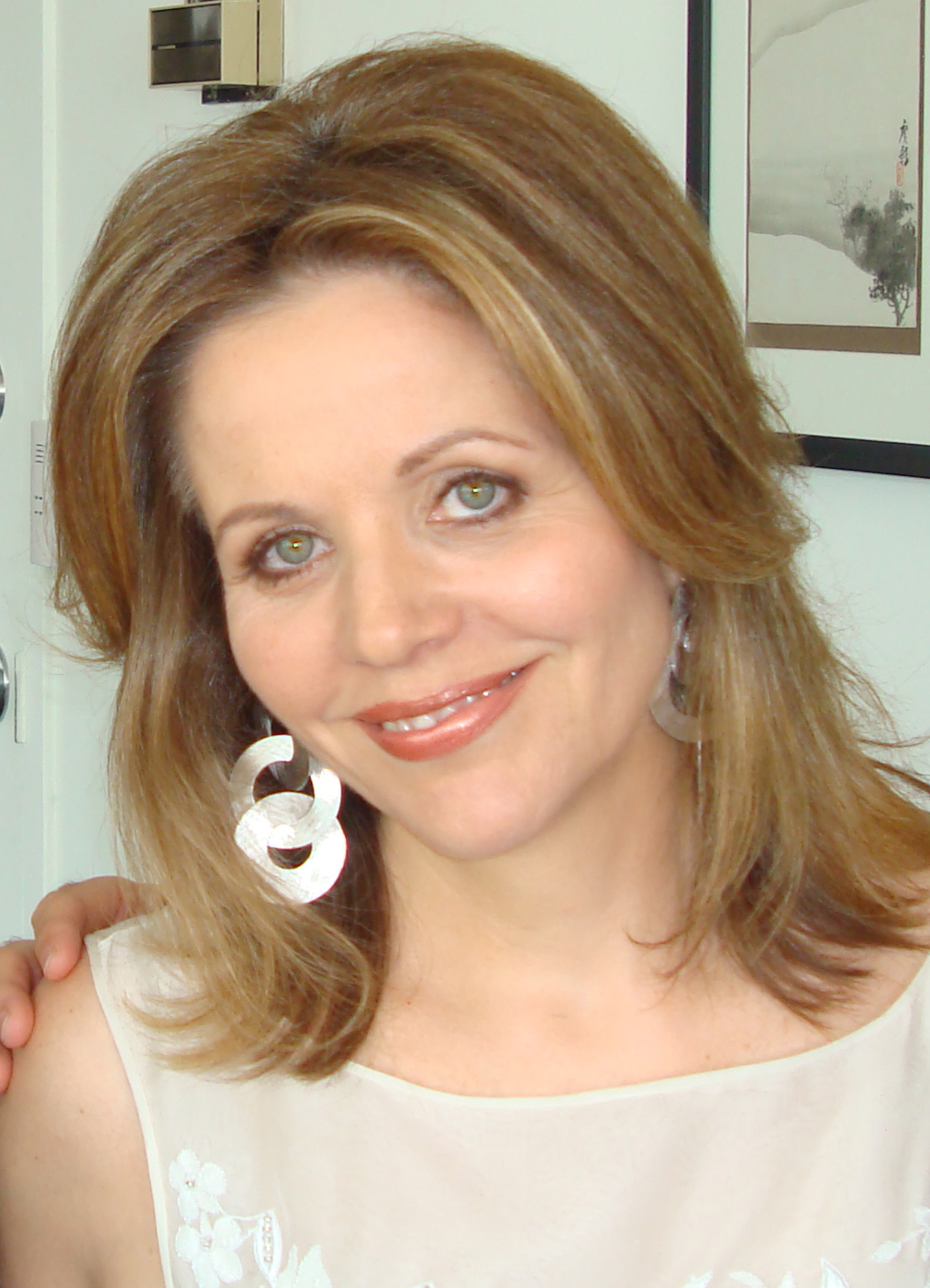
Renée Fleming in NY in 2008

On September 22, 2008, Fleming became the first woman in the 125-year history of the Met to solo headline opening night. Fleming performed three favorite roles: Violetta in act 2 of Verdi's La traviata; Manon in act 3 of Massenet's Manon; and the Countess in the final scene of Strauss's Capriccio. The performance was also transmitted live in HD to screens in Times Square. The 2008/09 season resulted in Fleming singing Desdemona and Thais at the Met, the Countess in Capriccio at the Vienna State Opera, Tatyana at the Tanglewood Music Festival, and Lucrezia Borgia at the Washington National Opera.

In 2009, Fleming premiered the complete version of Le temps l'horloge by Henri Dutilleux. She sang Violetta at Covent Garden and Rusalka at the Met, the Marschallin at the Baden-Baden Festival, the Théâtre des Champs-Élysées and the Met. She sang a variety of short pieces at Napa Valley's Festival del Sole in California.

Fleming sang in the opening concert of the 2009–10 season of the New York Philharmonic. The concert, telecast via Live from Lincoln Center, was the first performance of conductor Alan Gilbert as music director of the New York Philharmonic. Fleming performed Olivier Messiaen's song cycle Poèmes pour mi.

During the 2009–10 Met season, Fleming sang in Mary Zimmerman's new production of Rossini's Armida, in the first-ever production of the opera by the company. She returned to that role during the Met's 2010–2011 season, along with the Countess in Capriccio.

On November 14, 2009, Fleming performed at a concert in Prague organized by Václav Havel to celebrate the 20th anniversary of the Czech Velvet Revolution, which also featured Lou Reed, Joan Baez and others. Fleming sang the aria "Song to the Moon" from Rusalka in Czech, and also sang "Perfect Day" in a duet with Reed.

In a 2010 Wall Street Journal article, Fleming talked about her view of the battle between opera traditionalists and those who want to reinterpret the standards, siding – with some reservations – with the latter: "I'm not a reactionary. I've loved some of [these productions] when they've been well thought out. I have no problem with edgy, as long as it's not vulgar or disrespectful of the piece." She said her "classic" image meant that she was unlikely to be asked to perform in such productions. In the same interview, Fleming explained her increasing preference for performing in concerts, rather than opera productions, and said, having learned more than 50 operas, that she is unlikely to learn many more.

At the Last Night of the Proms in London in 2010, Fleming performed songs by Richard Strauss, Dvořák and Smetana. In December, the Board of Directors of Lyric Opera of Chicago announced that Fleming was named Creative Consultant, a first in the company's history.

=== 2011–2015 ===
On July 2, 2011, Fleming sang for the Wedding of Albert II, Prince of Monaco, and Charlene Wittstock in Monte Carlo. On October 21, 2011, Fleming headlined a gala concert in the opening festivities of the Royal Opera House Muscat in Oman. In November 2011, Fleming appeared in the title role of Handel's Rodelinda at the Met, in a revival of a production created for her in 2004, the first time the company had ever presented the work.

Fleming performed with the Philadelphia Orchestra on January 29, 2011, for the Academy of Music 154th Anniversary Concert. Paul Simon also performed at the concert, and together with Fleming sang "The Sound of Silence". On November 11, 2011, Fleming performed A. R. Gurney's Love Letters with Alec Baldwin at Carnegie Hall in New York City. In her role as creative consultant to the Lyric Opera of Chicago, Fleming collaborated with Chicago's Second City comedy troupe to develop Second City's Guide to the Opera, which was staged at the Lyric Opera on January 5, 2013. Fleming co-hosted and co-starred with actor Patrick Stewart for the sold-out performance.

On April 26, 2013, Fleming sang the world premiere of The Strand Settings at Carnegie Hall with the New York Philharmonic. Written for Fleming by Swedish composer Anders Hillborg and presented as part of Fleming's Perspectives residency at Carnegie Hall, the work is a setting of poems by the Canadian poet Mark Strand. The performance received a five-minute ovation. In the Spring of 2014, Fleming performed the role of Blanche Dubois in André Previn's operatic adaptation of A Streetcar Named Desire at Carnegie Hall in New York and later in Chicago and Los Angeles. The Los Angeles Times theater critic Charles McNulty described Fleming as "that rare opera star whose expressive vocal potential is nearly matched by a gestural eloquence", and wrote:

Renée Fleming's magnificent Blanche dominates the stage in every scene that she's in. The tragedy belongs to her character – and it's personal, achingly so. Fleming is quite simply the best Blanche I've seen since Elizabeth Marvel brutally essayed the role in Ivo van Hove's brilliant deconstruction at New York Theatre Workshop in 1999.

In January 2015, Fleming co-starred with Kelli O'Hara in a new production of the operetta The Merry Widow at the Met in New York. The production was directed by Susan Stroman, the winner of five Tony Awards. In April 2015, Fleming made her Broadway debut in a new comedy by Joe DiPietro, Living on Love, directed by Kathleen Marshall at the Longacre Theatre. Fleming played the role of an opera diva in the production, which also featured Douglas Sills, Anna Chlumsky and Jerry O'Connell.

=== 2016–present ===
On May 5, 2016, Fleming sang at Carnegie Hall's 125th Anniversary Gala. Itzhak Perlman, James Taylor, Yo-Yo Ma and others also performed. Richard Gere served as the host. On December 9, 2016, Fleming sang jazz with bassist Christian McBride at Wigmore Hall in London.

On May 13, 2017, Fleming performed the role of the Marschallin in Der Rosenkavalier for the last time at the Met. In an interview, Fleming stated that she will focus in the future on new roles.

Fleming performed the role of Nettie Fowler in a 2018 Broadway revival of Carousel at the Imperial Theatre. Produced by Scott Rudin and directed by Jack O'Brien, the show garnered 11 Tony Award nominations, including a Tony nomination for Fleming herself.

On September 1, 2018, Fleming sang "Danny Boy" at the funeral service for Senator John McCain held at the Washington National Cathedral. On October 2, 2018, Fleming sang at the Carnegie Hall opening night gala with Audra McDonald and the San Francisco Symphony, conducted by Michael Tilson Thomas.

During April and May 2019, Fleming appeared opposite actor Ben Whishaw in Norma Jeane Baker of Troy, the inaugural production in the Kenneth C. Griffin Theater at The Shed in Manhattan. In his review, New York Times theater critic Ben Brantley wrote:

[Fleming's] creamy, disembodied voice floats through the air like thought made sound...Mr. Whishaw and Ms. Fleming are, against the odds, marvelous. They somehow lend an emotional spontaneity to ritualistic words and gestures, while conjuring an affecting relationship.

On July 24, 2019, Fleming performed the world premiere of Penelope, a collaboration between Tom Stoppard and André Previn, with the Emerson String Quartet and pianist Simone Dinnerstein. Fleming was joined by actress Uma Thurman, who provided narration for the spoken text. In the summer of 2019, Fleming co-starred with Dove Cameron and Alex Jennings in the London premiere of The Light in the Piazza, which received six Tony awards when it opened on Broadway in 2005. In his review of the musical for The Daily Telegraph, Rupert Christiansen wrote "[The] first London staging is lucky to have netted Renée Fleming for the central role of Margaret ... Fleming makes the transition to Broadway style effortlessly, using her gorgeously rich middle register ... and handling the spoken dialogue with wit and assurance." Fleming performed the same role when the production was staged in Los Angeles and Chicago later in 2019.

In 2019, Fleming also premiered the Pulitzer Prize-winning composer Kevin Puts' The Brightness of Light, a setting of letters between Georgia O'Keeffe and Alfred Stieglitz. Fleming performed the work in concert at Tanglewood, Santa Fe, Aspen and the Kennedy Center.

On September 25, 2020, Fleming appeared in a live concert with Vanessa Williams, titled "A Time to Sing", for a small, socially-distanced audience in the Kennedy Center Opera House. The performance, the first on a stage inside the Kennedy Center since the March 13 shutdown caused by the COVID-19 pandemic, was also live-streamed.

On January 20, 2021, Fleming sang at a private mass attended by President-elect Joe Biden and Vice President-elect Kamala Harris prior to their swearing-in as president and vice president of the US. Attendees also included the Democratic and Republican leaders of the Senate and House of Representatives.

On November 22, 2022, she returned to the stage to sing the role of Clarissa Vaughan in the world premiere of Kevin Puts' opera The Hours at the Met. The performance of December 10 was video-cast as part of the Met Live in HD series. She performed with Dead and Company at the Las Vegas Sphere concert during their Space segment on 4/18/25

== Personal life ==
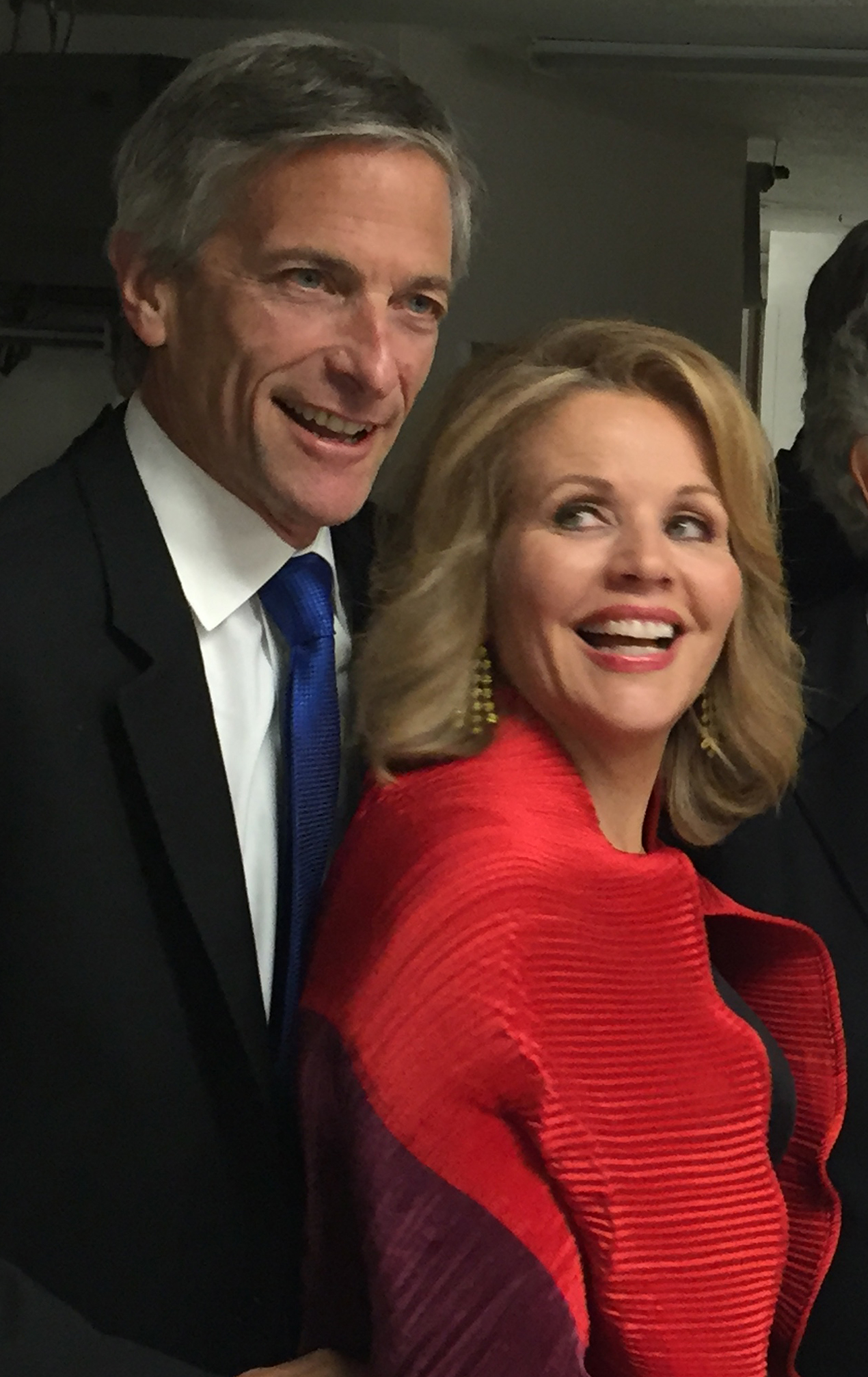
Fleming with husband Tim Jessell

Fleming has been married twice. Fleming married actor Rick Ross in 1989, and the couple had two daughters. The couple divorced in 2000. On September 3, 2011, Fleming married tax lawyer Tim Jessell, whom she met on a blind date set up by author Ann Patchett.

== Non-classical recordings ==
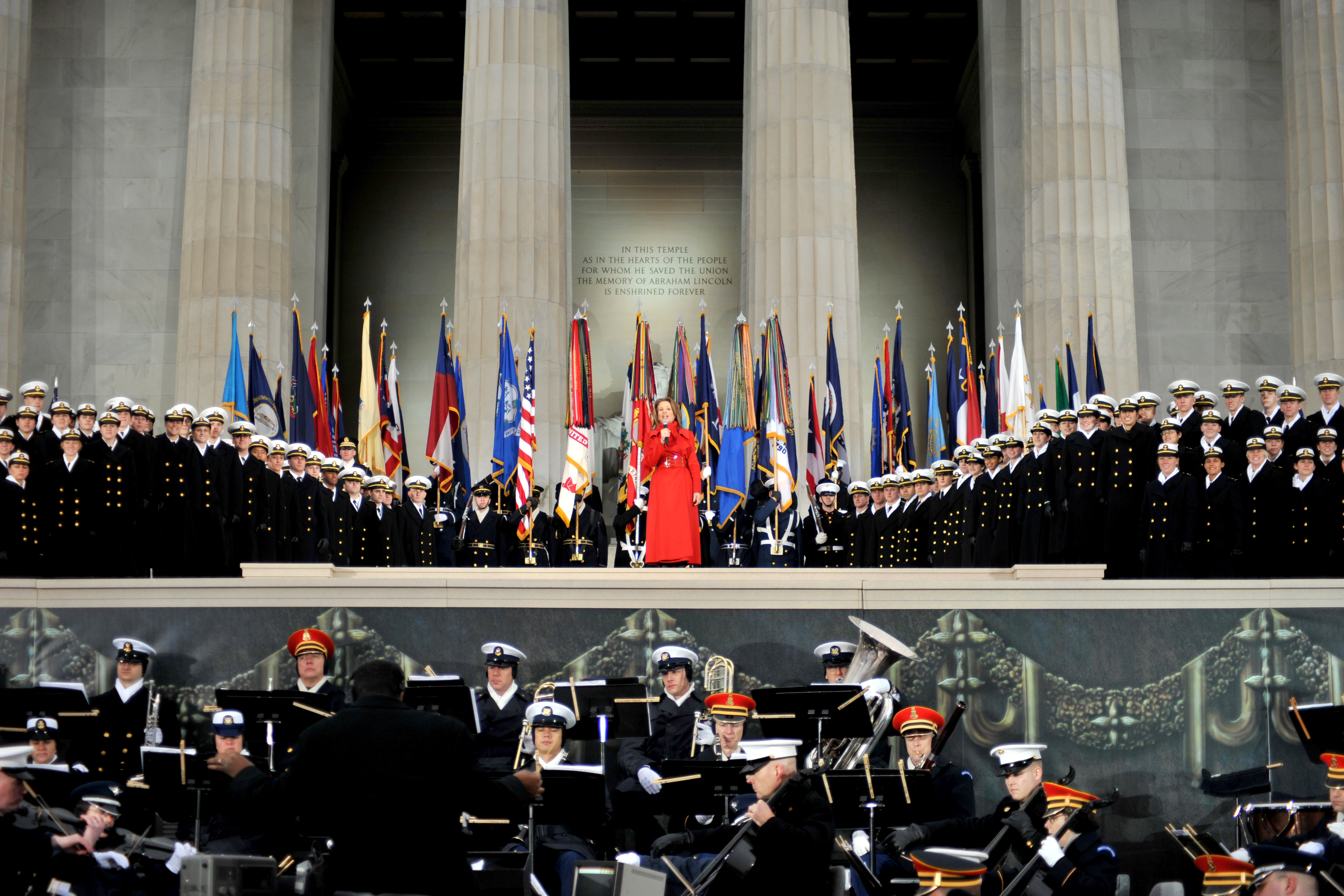
Fleming performs at We Are One: The Obama Inaugural Celebration at the Lincoln Memorial on January 18, 2009.

Fleming appeared as a special guest vocalist on Joe Jackson's 1994 album Night Music on the song "Lullaby". Fleming has released a number of recordings on the Decca label. In 2000 she was a guest artist alongside the cellist Julian Lloyd Webber and the violinist Gil Shaham on the album Two Worlds by Dave Grusin and Lee Ritenour. In 2005, Fleming recorded a jazz album with pianist Fred Hersch and guitarist Bill Frisell entitled Haunted Heart. On June 8, 2010, Decca/Mercury released Fleming's album Dark Hope, a collection of indie rock covers. The album was the idea of rock managers Peter Mensch and Cliff Burnstein; after listening to Fleming's performance of "In the Pines" on Elvis Costello's TV show Spectacle, they approached Fleming and producer David Kahne. Fleming's Dark Hope album features covers of songs by Leonard Cohen, Band of Horses, Jefferson Airplane and others.

In 2008, Fleming sang Blossom Dearie's "Touch the Hand of Love" accompanied by Chris Thile, Edgar Meyers, and Yo-Yo Ma on Ma's Songs of Joy and Peace album. In November 2010, the Charlie Haden Quartet West released the jazz CD Sophisticated Ladies in which Fleming was a guest vocalist on the song "A Love Like This" by Ned Washington and Victor Young. In 2014, Decca released Fleming's holiday album Christmas in New York, with intimately-arranged jazz treatments of holiday standards. Guests on the album include Chris Botti, Kurt Elling, Wynton Marsalis, Brad Mehldau, Kelli O'Hara, Gregory Porter and Rufus Wainwright. The album was the inspiration for a PBS special featuring Fleming with the same title.

In 2015, Fleming sang "New York Tendaberry" accompanied by Chris Thile, Edgar Meyers and Yo-Yo Ma on the Billy Childs album Map to the Treasure: Reimagining Laura Nyro, the song winning the Grammy for Best Arrangement, Instruments and Vocals. In 2017, Decca released Fleming's album Distant Light, which features four songs by the Icelandic composer Björk, Samuel Barber's Knoxville: Summer of 1915 and the Strand Settings, a four-song cycle composite by Anders Hillborg. Fleming recorded an album of musical theater songs, Reneé Fleming: Broadway, which was released by Decca in 2018. Guest artists included Christian McBride, Leslie Odom Jr., and Dan Tepfer.

On March 25, 2026, it was announced that Fleming would release a collaborative album with American bluegrass and americana musician Béla Fleck. The album, titled The Fiddle and the Drum, was released on May 29, 2026, and includes guest appearances from Dolly Parton, Vince Gill, Jerry Douglas, Sierra Hull, Aoife O'Donovan, and Sarah Jarosz.

== TV, radio, film, and digital platforms ==
=== 2000s ===
Fleming appeared on the children's show Sesame Street singing a lively rendition of "Caro nome" from Rigoletto, replacing the traditional Italian text with lyrics intended to aid children learning to count. She performed several times on Garrison Keillor's public radio program A Prairie Home Companion.

Fleming appears on the soundtrack of the 2003 film The Lord of the Rings: The Return of the King in which she sings in the fictional language Sindarin. Fleming also sang on the soundtrack of the 2003 Disney release, Piglet's Big Movie, performing the duet "Comforting to Know" with Carly Simon. In 2004, Fleming performed in the Kennedy Center Honors gala, telecast on CBS, in tribute to honoree Warren Beatty. She previously performed in Kennedy Center Honors broadcasts for André Previn (1998) and Van Cliburn (2001). On November 18, 2005, Fleming appeared as guest on the BBC Radio 4 radio programme Desert Island Discs; her favourite was Joni Mitchell's 1971 song "River". Fleming performed "I'll Be Home for Christmas" on ABC's The View on December 18, 2008.

Fleming performed on HBO's We Are One: The Obama Inaugural Celebration at the Lincoln Memorial on January 18, 2009, a concert which also included performances by Bruce Springsteen, Mary J. Blige, Stevie Wonder, Garth Brooks, U2 and others. Fleming sang the Rodgers and Hammerstein classic "You'll Never Walk Alone" with the combined choirs of the United States Naval Academy. Fleming appeared on the December 18, 2009, broadcast of the Martha Stewart Show and baked cookies with Stewart and Snoop Dogg.

Fleming was featured on the first episode of the second season of HBO Masterclass. She led a master class in which she taught and mentored four aspiring college-aged singers.

On Good Morning America on June 8, 2010, Fleming performed a cover of Muse's "Endlessly" from their album Absolution.

=== 2011–2015 ===
Fleming appears on the soundtrack of the 2011 Steven Spielberg animated film The Adventures of Tintin: The Secret of the Unicorn as the singing voice of opera diva Bianca Castafiore, singing Juliette's waltz from Gounod's Romeo et Juliette. She recorded Alexandre Desplat's theme song "Still Dream" for the 2012 DreamWorks animated feature, Rise of the Guardians.

On March 20, 2011, Fleming appeared in Grand Finale concert of the YouTube Symphony Orchestra with the Sydney Children's Choir, performing Mozart's "Caro bell'idol mio" K562, under the baton of Michael Tilson Thomas. In less than one week, the concert had 33 million online views.

On April 6, 2012, Fleming performed Broadway duets with Josh Groban on PBS's Live at Lincoln Center.

On June 4, 2012, Fleming performed at the Queen Elizabeth II Diamond Jubilee Concert from the balcony of Buckingham Palace, a concert which was internationally broadcast and included performances by Elton John, Paul McCartney, Kylie Minogue, Ed Sheeran and others.

In November 2013, Fleming programmed and hosted a three-day festival held at the John F. Kennedy Center for the Performing Arts in Washington DC titled "American Voices", which explored the artistry and pedagogy of singing across musical genres. Sara Bareilles, Kim Burrell, Ben Folds, Sutton Foster, Alison Krauss and others conducted master classes and performed in the centerpiece American Voices concert, in which Fleming also performed. A 90-minute documentary on the festival and the concert was broadcast on PBS Great Performances.

On September 26, 2013, Fleming sang the Late Show Top Ten List ("Top 10 Opera Lyrics") on CBS's Late Show with David Letterman.

On February 2, 2014, Fleming was the first opera singer to perform "The Star-Spangled Banner" as part of the Super Bowl XLVIII pre-game ceremonies, the broadcast earning the Fox Network the highest ratings of any television program in the network's history. It was also the largest audience in the history of American television, until it was eclipsed by NBC's airing of Super Bowl XLIX the following year. The gown which Fleming wore while performing has been added to the permanent collection of the Smithsonian Institute's National Museum of American History.

On November 9, 2014, with German Chancellor Angela Merkel and Mikhail Gorbachev in attendance, Fleming sang in a televised concert at the Brandenburg Gate to commemorate the 25th anniversary of the fall of the Berlin Wall.

=== 2016–present ===
On May 29, 2016, Fleming sang "How Can I Keep from Singing?" to honor fallen service men and women in the National Memorial Day Concert held on West Lawn of the Capitol in Washington, D.C. The concert was broadcast on PBS.

In 2017, Fleming, in her capacity as creative consultant for the Lyric Opera of Chicago, conceived and served as artistic director of Chicago Voices, a festival and concert celebrating Chicago's vocal music legacy and featuring Kurt Elling, Lupe Fiasco, Jessie Mueller, John Prine, Michelle Williams, Terrence Howard and others. Fleming also hosted and performed in the concert, which has been broadcast nationwide on PBS's Great Performances and won three Midwest/Chicago Emmy awards.

In the 2017 film Three Billboards Outside Ebbing, Missouri, Fleming's Decca recording of "The Last Rose of Summer" is heard in the opening scene and in the middle of the movie, which was nominated for Best Picture and Best Original Score.

In April 2018, Fleming was interviewed by David Rubenstein on The David Rubenstein Show: Peer-to-Peer Conversations, which was broadcast on Bloomberg Television.

Fleming sings "You'll Never Know" on the soundtrack of the film The Shape of Water, which won four Academy Awards, including Best Picture, and Best Original Score for composer Alexandre Desplat.

On July 4, 2018, Fleming sang in the PBS telecast A Capitol Fourth from the West Lawn of the US Capitol, performing "You'll Never Walk Alone" and, during the fireworks display, "America the Beautiful".

On September 1, 2018, Fleming sang "Danny Boy" at the funeral service for Senator John McCain held at the Washington National Cathedral.

Fleming provided the singing voice of Roxann Coss, the American opera diva played by Julianne Moore, in the 2018 film Bel Canto, an adaptation of Ann Patchett's best-selling novel.

At the 2018 Kennedy Center Honors awards ceremony broadcast on CBS, Fleming sang a jazz aria composed by honoree Wayne Shorter as a tribute to Shorter.

Fleming appeared as a guest on the National Public Radio quiz show Wait Wait... Don't Tell Me! broadcast on October 19, 2019.

On June 14, 2020, Fleming premiered a new work by composer John Corigliano, "And the People Stayed Home", a setting of Kitty O'Meara's poem, which was written in the first weeks of the pandemic and became a viral success on social media. The performance was part of a streamed concert, We Are Here: A Celebration of Resilience, Resistance, and Hope, which also featured performances by Whoopi Goldberg, Lang Lang, and Billy Joel.

On August 1, 2020, Fleming performed a live recital for the Metropolitan Opera Met Stars Live in Concert series, live-streamed from Dumbarton Oaks Music Room in Washington, DC. The performance was later telecast on PBS Great Performances.

Fleming was featured in the PBS Great Performances New Year's Eve telecast on December 31, 2020, in a concert taped at Mount Vernon that also included Joshua Bell, Denyce Graves, Jean-Yves Thibaudet, Yo-Yo Ma, Anna Deavere Smith, Audra McDonald, Brian Stokes Mitchell, and Patti LaBelle.

== Music and health ==
Fleming has been an advocate for the study of the relationship between music and health, as well as the utility of music in neuroscience research.

In 2016, Fleming was appointed Artistic Advisor for the John F. Kennedy Center for the Performing Arts. In this capacity, she spearheaded Sound Health, a collaboration between the Kennedy Center and the National Institutes of Health (NIH). Sound Health has brought together leading neuroscientists, music therapists and arts practitioners to better understand the impact of arts on the mind and body. In September 2019, the NIH announced a commitment of $20 million to support research projects to explore the potential of music for treating a wide range of conditions resulting from neurological and other disorders. In February 2025, she and those in multiple other positions at the Kennedy Center resigned from their positions after several members of the Board were removed and the sitting chair was removed and replaced by Donald Trump.

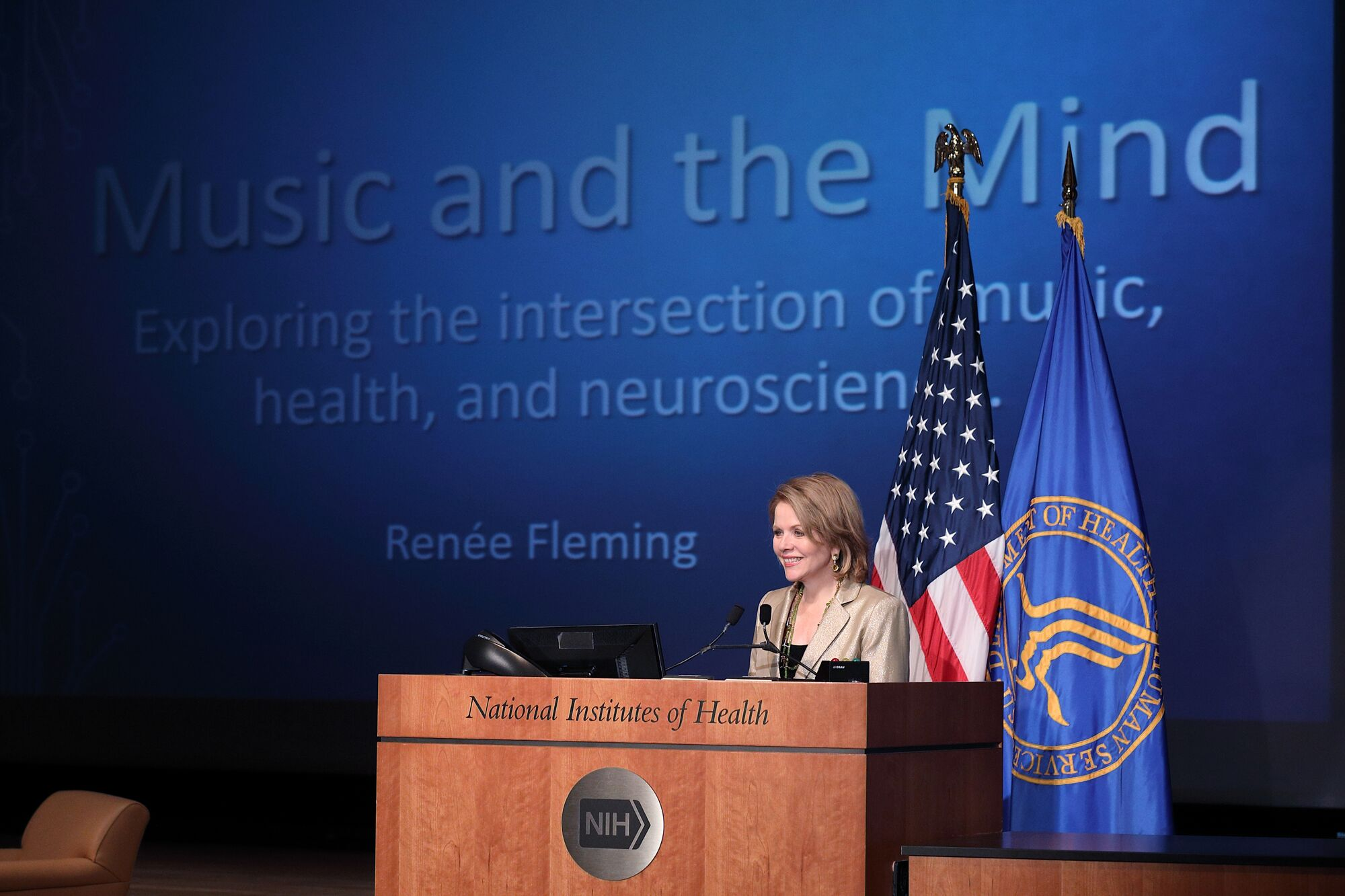
Renée Fleming speaking at NIH May 2019

In 2017, Fleming and Francis Collins, director of the National Institutes of Health, had published a joint article in the Journal of the American Medical Association on music and health.

While touring for performances, Fleming has given presentations around the world called "Music and the Mind", exploring the power of music as it relates to health and the brain. Fleming's presentations on this subject have been made at hospitals, arts organizations and research universities. They have included the Compton Lecture at the Massachusetts Institute of Technology, the Pritzker Lecture for the Chicago Public Library and the J. Edward Rall Cultural Lecture at the National Institutes of Health.

Fleming has been an Artist Spokesperson for the American Music Therapy Association.

In 2020, Research!America awarded Fleming the Isadore Rosenfeld Award for Impact on Public Opinion for her commitment to research advocacy at the intersection of music, the brain, and wellness.

In May 2020, after the COVID-19 pandemic had halted concert touring, Fleming launched Music and Mind LIVE, a weekly web series, streamed via Fleming's Facebook page and the John F. Kennedy Center for the Performing Arts YouTube Channel. Episodes featured different guest experts each week from the worlds of medicine, music therapy, research, advocacy, and performing arts, with viewer Q&A. The first guest was former U.S. Surgeon General Dr. Vivek Murthy, and later guests included author and neuroscientists Dr. Daniel Levitin, Director of the U.S. National Institutes of Health Dr. Francis Collins, Deepak Chopra, M.D., and Grateful Dead drummer Mickey Hart. 19 episodes were streamed with a total of more than 665,000 views from 70 countries.

On April 20, 2021, the Foundation for the National Institutes of Health (FNIH) announced a grant from the Renée Fleming Foundation to convene experts from the fields of neuroscience, music therapy and medicine, behavioral intervention development, clinical trial methodology, and patient advocacy. The goal of these conventions was to explore enhanced data collection for improved clinical trial design and, ultimately, to create a research toolkit to help develop music-based therapies for brain disorders of aging.

On May 6, 2021, Fleming spoke in the Fifth International Vatican Conference (conducted online during the COVID-19 pandemic) on a panel exploring the therapeutic use of music for patients with heart failure and cardiovascular disease. The 3-day conference also featured Dr. Anthony Fauci, Dr. Sanjay Gupta, Jane Goodall, PhD, and US Surgeon General Vivek Murthy, MD.

== Philanthropy and advocacy ==
On July 13, 2004, Fleming joined Elton John on stage at Radio City Music Hall to perform Your Song, in the finale of his benefit concert for Juilliard and the Royal Academy of Music.

Fleming has supported and served on the board of directors of Sing For Hope since the organization's inception in 2006. Sing For Hope is a nonprofit that brings music programs and performances to under-resourced schools, healthcare facilities, refugee camps, transit hubs, and public spaces.

On April 11, 2013, Fleming hosted and performed at the 20th anniversary gala of Classical Action, a program of Broadway Cares/Equity Fights AIDS that raises funds for AIDS and family-service organizations nationwide.

On April 17, 2014, Fleming sang for the 25th anniversary concert of the Rainforest Foundation Fund at Carnegie Hall, performing solo and "Là ci darem la mano" in a duet with Sting. The program also included Paul Simon, Stephen Stills, Patti Scialfa and James Taylor.

In 2015, Fleming and Andrea Bocelli sang together for the first time ever at "Remembering Pavarotti", a benefit concert for pancreatic cancer research at the Los Angeles Music Center's Dorothy Chandler Pavilion on September 25.

Fleming has served on the board of trustees of Carnegie Hall, and as the artistic director of SongStudio, Carnegie's intensive program for emerging vocalists and pianists dedicated to the art of the song recital.

Fleming has been a member of the Artistic Advisory Board of the Polyphony Foundation, which brings Israeli youth together through the study and performance of music. Polyphony, through its executive director Naheel Abboud-Askar, has created a conservatory in Nazareth where Arab and Jewish students train together, and it has created music appreciation programs for Israeli kindergartens and elementary schools.

== Roles ==
Fleming's signature roles include Countess Almaviva in Mozart's Le nozze di Figaro, Desdemona in Verdi's Otello, Violetta in Verdi's La traviata, the title role in Dvořák's Rusalka, the title roles in Massenet's Manon and Thaïs, Tatyana in Tchaikovsky's Eugene Onegin, the title role in Richard Strauss's Arabella, the Marschallin in Strauss's Der Rosenkavalier, the Countess in Strauss's Capriccio, and Blanche DuBois in André Previn's A Streetcar Named Desire.

Roles by Renée Fleming
Year (debut)	Role	Composer	Opera	Location
1978	Laurie Moss	Aaron Copland	The Tender Land	Crane School of Music – SUNY Potsdam
1979	Alison	Gustav Holst	The Wandering Scholar	Crane School of Music – SUNY Potsdam
1980	Elsie Maynard	Gilbert and Sullivan	The Yeomen of the Guard	Crane School of Music – SUNY Potsdam
1981	Zerlina	Mozart	Don Giovanni	Eastman School of Music
1983	Anne Sexton	Conrad Susa	Transformations	Aspen Music Festival and School
1983	Musetta	Puccini	La bohème	Juilliard Opera Center
1984	Countess Almaviva	Mozart	The Marriage of Figaro	Aspen Music Festival and School
1986	Konstanze	Mozart	Die Entführung aus dem Serail	Salzburger Landestheater
1986	Frasquita	Bizet	Carmen	Virginia Opera
1986	Belle Fezziwig & Laundress, Martha Cratchit, Rosie	Thea Musgrave	A Christmas Carol	Virginia Opera
1987	the Wife	Menotti	Tamu-Tamu	Juilliard Opera Center
1987	Anne	Stravinsky	The Rake's Progress	Aspen Music Festival and School
1988	Thalie, Clarine, La Folie	Jean-Philippe Rameau	Platée	Il Piccolo Teatro dell'Opera
1988	Pamina	Mozart	The Magic Flute	Virginia Opera
1989	Mimì	Puccini	La bohème	New York City Opera
1989	Dircé	Cherubini	Médée	Royal Opera House, Covent Garden
1989	Imogene	Bellini	Il pirata	Opera Orchestra of New York
1990	Rusalka	Dvořák	Rusalka	Seattle Opera
1990	Micaëla	Bizet	Carmen	New York City Opera
1990	Lucrezia Borgia	Donizetti	Lucrezia Borgia	Opera Orchestra of New York
1990	Maria Padilla	Donizetti	Maria Padilla	Opera Omaha
1991	Rosina	Corigliano	The Ghosts of Versailles	Metropolitan Opera
1991	Ilia	Mozart	Idomeneo	Tanglewood Music Festival
1991	Amina	Bellini	La sonnambula	Carnegie Hall
1991	Thaïs	Massenet	Thaïs	Washington Concert Opera
1991	Sandrina	Mozart	La finta giardiniera	Paris, Salle Pleyel
1992	La Contessa di Folleville	Rossini	Il viaggio a Reims	Royal Opera House, Covent Garden
1992	Fiordiligi	Mozart	Così fan tutte	Grand Théâtre de Genève
1992	Anna	Boieldieu	La dame blanche	Carnegie Hall
1992	Fortuna	Mozart	Il sogno di Scipione	Alice Tully Hall, Lincoln Center
1992	Tatyana	Tchaikovsky	Eugene Onegin	Dallas Opera
1993	Armida	Rossini	Armida	Pesaro, Rossini Festival
1993	Donna Elvira	Mozart	Don Giovanni	Teatro alla Scala
1993	Alaide	Bellini	La straniera	Carnegie Hall
1993	Susannah	Floyd	Susannah	Lyric Opera of Chicago
1993	Lulu	Alban Berg	Symphonic Pieces from Lulu	Metropolitan Concert/Gala at Ann Arbor, Michigan
1993	Jenůfa	Leoš Janáček	Jenůfa	Dallas Opera
1994	Desdemona	Verdi	Otello	Metropolitan Opera
1994	Ellen Orford	Britten	Peter Grimes	Metropolitan Opera
1994	Madame de Tourvel	Conrad Susa	The Dangerous Liaisons	San Francisco Opera
1994	Salome	Massenet	Hérodiade	San Francisco Opera
1994	Rosmonda Clifford	Donizetti	Rosmonda d'Inghilterra	London
1995	Marschallin	R. Strauss	Der Rosenkavalier	Houston Grand Opera
1995	Amelia	Verdi	Simon Boccanegra	Royal Opera at Covent Garden
1996	Marguerite	Gounod	Faust	Lyric Opera of Chicago
1996	Donna Anna	Mozart	Don Giovanni	Opéra national de Paris
1996	Eva	Wagner	Die Meistersinger von Nürnberg	Bayreuth Festival
1997	Manon	Massenet	Manon	Opéra Bastille
1998	Arabella	R. Strauss	Arabella	Houston Grand Opera
1998	Blanche DuBois	André Previn	A Streetcar Named Desire	San Francisco Opera
1998	Gabriel / Eva	Joseph Haydn	Die Schöpfung	Tanglewood Music Festival
1999	Alcina	Handel	Alcina	Opéra national de Paris
1999	Louise	Charpentier	Louise	San Francisco Opera
2003	Violetta	Verdi	La traviata	Houston Grand Opera
2004	Rodelinda	Handel	Rodelinda	Metropolitan Opera
2004	Countess	R. Strauss	Capriccio	Palais Garnier
2005	Daphne	R. Strauss	Daphne	University of Michigan
2010	Hanna Glawari	Lehár	The Merry Widow	Semperoper Dresden
2012	Ariadne	R. Strauss	Ariadne auf Naxos	Baden-Baden
2018	Nettie Fowler	Rodgers and Hammerstein	Carousel	Imperial Theatre, Broadway (Tony nomination)
2019	Margaret Johnson	Adam Guettel	The Light in the Piazza	London, Los Angeles, Chicago, Sydney
2022	Clarissa Vaughan	Kevin Puts	The Hours	Metropolitan Opera
2023	Pat Nixon	John Adams	Nixon in China	Opéra National de Paris

== Recordings ==
=== Audio ===
- A Salute to American Music, RCA 1992
- New Year's Eve Concert 1992: Richard Strauss Gala, Sony 1993
- Marilyn Horne: Divas in Song, RCA 1994
- Donizetti: Rosmonda d'Inghilterra, Opera Rara 1994
- Strauss Four Last Songs, RCA 1996
- Visions of Love – Mozart Arias, Decca 1996
- Schubert Lieder, Decca 1997
- Signatures – Great Opera Scenes, arias by Mozart, Verdi, Britten, Strauss, with Sir Georg Solti, Decca 1997
- Elijah (Mendelssohn), Decca 1997
- Rusalka (1997)
- A Streetcar Named Desire (1997)
- The Beautiful Voice, Decca 1998
- I Want Magic American Opera Arias, Decca 1998
- Star Crossed Lovers Duets with Plácido Domingo, Decca 1999
- Strauss Heroines, Decca 1999
- The Faces of Love: The Songs of Jake Heggie, RCA 1999
- Requiem (Verdi) with Andrea Bocelli, Olga Borodina and Ildebrando D'Arcangelo, conducted by Valery Gergiev, Philips 2001
- Renée Fleming, Decca 2001
- Night Songs Lieder by Debussy, Fauré, Marx, Strauss, Rachmaninov, Decca 2001
- Thaïs (2001)
- Manon (2001)
- Bel Canto Arias by Donizetti, Bellini, Rossini, Decca 2002
- Under the Stars Broadway Duets with Bryn Terfel, Decca 2003
- By Request, Decca 2003
- Mozart: Così fan tutte, Decca
- Handel: Alcina, Erato
- Rossini: Armida, Sony (live)
- Mozart: Don Giovanni, Decca
- Massenet: Hérodiade, Sony (live)
- Handel Arias, Decca 2003/2004
- Requiem (Verdi), Philips 2004
- Haunted Heart, Decca 2005
- Sacred Songs, Decca 2005
- Homage – The Age of the Diva, Decca 2006
- Love Sublime Song cycles with Brad Mehldau, Nonesuch, 2006
- Strauss: Daphne, Decca
- Four Last Songs by Richard Strauss, Decca 2008
- Verismo – Arias of Puccini, Mascagni, Cilea, Giordano, Leoncavallo, Decca 2009
- Dark Hope, Decca 2010
- Poèmes – French songs, Decca 2012
- Guilty Pleasures – Wide range of opera arias, Decca 2013
- Christmas in New York, Decca 2014
- Distant Light, Decca 2017
- Rodgers & Hammerstein's Carousel, 2018 Broadway Cast Recording, Craft Recordings, 2018
- Renée Fleming: Broadway, Decca 2018
- Lieder: Brahms, Schumann, and Mahler, Decca 2019
- Voice of Nature: the Anthropocene, art songs and world premieres, with Yannick Nézet-Séguin, pianist, Decca 2021
- Renée Fleming: Greatest Moments at the Met, live performances at the Metropolitan Opera, multiple composers, double album, Decca 2023
- The Fiddle and the Drum with Béla Fleck, Thirty Tigers, 2026

=== Video ===
- Mozart: The Marriage of Figaro, NVC Arts 1999
- Previn: A Streetcar Named Desire, Arthaus 1999
- The Kindness of Strangers (documentary) Arthaus 2001
- Ladies and Gentlemen Miss Renée Fleming (documentary) Decca 2002
- Verdi: Otello, Deutsche Grammophon 2004
- Mozart: Don Giovanni, Deutsche Grammophon 2005
- James Levine's 25th Anniversary Metropolitan Opera Gala, Deutsche Grammophon 2005
- Tchaikovsky: Eugene Onegin, Decca 2007
- Verdi: La traviata, Decca 2007
- Strauss, R: New Year's Eve Concert 1992: Richard Strauss Gala, Kultur 2007
- Strauss, R: Arabella, Decca 2008
- Metropolitan Opera: The Audition (2008 documentary)
- Massenet: Manon, Arthaus 2009
- Strauss, R: Der Rosenkavalier, Decca 2009
- Dvořák: Rusalka, Arthaus 2009
- Massenet: Thaïs, Decca 2010
- Rossini: Armida, Decca 2011
- Strauss, R: Capriccio, Decca 2011
- Strauss, R: Capriccio, Arthaus 2011
- Handel: Rodelinda, Decca 2012
- Strauss, R: Ariadne auf Naxos, Decca 2013
- Donizetti: Lucrezia Borgia, EuroArts DVD, 2013
- Strauss, R: Der Rosenkavalier, Metropolitan Opera HD, 2017, Decca
- Puts: The Hours, Metropolitan Opera on Demand in HD, 2022

== Honors and accolades ==
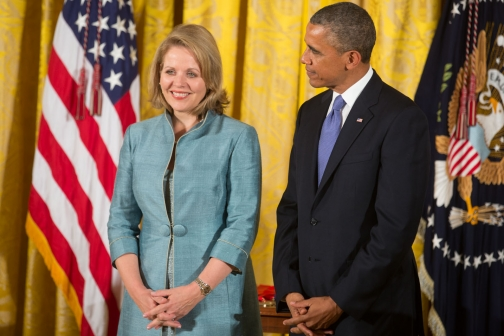
President Barack Obama awards Renée Fleming the 2012 National Medal of Arts.

Organizations	Year	Award	Result	Ref.
Sigma Alpha Iota	1993	Honorary member	Honored	
Grammy Awards	1999	Best Classical Vocal Performance for The Beautiful Voice	Won	
Grammy Awards	2003	Best Classical Vocal Performance for Bel Canto	Won	
Grammy Awards	2010	Best Classical Vocal Performance for Verismo	Won	
Grammy Awards	2013	Best Classical Vocal Solo for Poèmes	Won	
Grammy Awards	2023	Best Classical Vocal Solo for Voice of Nature: the Anthropocene	Won	
Royal Academy of Music	2003	Honorary Membership	Honored	
The Juilliard School,	2003	Honorary Doctorate	Honored	
Classic Brit Awards.	2004	Brit Award for Outstanding Contribution to Music	Won	
Federal Republic of France	2005	Chevalier de la Légion d'honneur	Honored	
Royal Swedish Academy of Music	2008	Polar Music Prize	Honored	
Eastman School of Music	2011	Honorary Doctorate	Honored	
Fulbright Program	2011	Lifetime Achievement Medal	Honored	
Victoires de la musique classique	2012	Victoire d'Honneur prize	Honored	
Carnegie Mellon University	2012	Honorary Doctorate of Fine Arts	Honored	
ECHO Klassik Awards	2012	Singer of the Year by the German	Won	
United States Congress	2012	National Medal of Arts	Honored	
Harvard University	2015	Honorary Doctor of Music degree	Honored	
Federal Republic of Germany	2015	Order of Merit	Honored	
Classic Brit Awards	2018	Female Artist of the Year	Won	
Northwestern University	2018	Honorary Doctor of Arts	Honored	
Edison Award	2018	The Oeuvre Prize	Honored	
Yale University	2020	Honorary Doctor of Music degree	Honored	
Research!America	2021	Isadore Rosenfeld Award for Impact on Public Opinion	Honored	
Peabody Institute	2021	George Peabody Medal	Honored	
World Economic Forum	2023	Crystal Award at Davos, Switzerland	Honored	
Johns Hopkins University	2024	Honorary Degree	Honored	
Dickinson College	2024	Honorary Degree	Honored	
Harvard Neuroscience Institute	2024	David Mahoney Prize	Honored	
Knowles Hearing Center at Northwestern University	2025	Hugh Knowles Prize for Distinguished Achievement	Honored	
American Academy of Achievement	2026	Golden Plate Award	Honored	

== In popular culture ==
- In 2000, Chef Daniel Boulud named a dessert, La Diva Renée, after her.
- Ann Patchett used Fleming as the inspiration for a character in the 2001 novel Bel Canto.
- In 2017, the National Recording Registry honored Fleming's album Signatures which was selected for preservation in the by the Library of Congress
- On May 29, 2018, the asteroid 31249 Renéefleming was named in her honor.
- Foreign member of the Royal Swedish Academy of Music.

== Publications ==
- Fleming, Renée. The Inner Voice: The Making of a Singer. New York: Penguin Group, 2004. ISBN 978-0-14-303594-7 (paperback). Published in France by Fayard Editions, in the United Kingdom by Virgin Books, by Henschel Verlag in Germany, Shunjusha in Japan, Pro Musica Mundi in Poland, Fantom Press in Russia, and by Guangxi Normal University Press Group in China. This book is presently in its 16th printing with publications in France, U.K, Poland, Russia, Germany, Japan, and in China.
- Fleming, Renée. Music and Mind: Harnessing the Arts for Health and Wellness. New York: Penguin Random House, 2024. ISBN 978-0-593-65319-7 (hard cover).
