= Christmas in New York (album) =

Studio album by Renée Fleming
- Released: November 3, 2014
- Recorded: December 2013–August 2014
- Genres: Christmas, jazz
- Length: 56:04
- Label: Decca

Renée Fleming chronology
Guilty Pleasures (2013)	Christmas in New York (2014)	Distant Light (2017)

Christmas in New York is an album by soprano Renée Fleming.

== Music and release ==
The music is jazz-pop, instead of Fleming's more usual operatic material. The album was released by Decca Records on November 3, 2014. It was promoted in part by a PBS broadcast led by Fleming on December 4 of that year.

== Reception ==
Professional ratings
Review scores
Source	Rating
AllMusic	4/5 stars

The AllMusic reviewer commented on the sameness of many of the tracks and the diverse expectations of fans of various genres, and concluded, "In all this is a holiday release that is unlikely to disappoint, even as reactions may vary."

== Track listing ==
1. "Winter Wonderland" (with Wynton Marsalis)
2. "Have Yourself a Merry Little Christmas" (with Gregory Porter)
3. "Silver Bells" (with Kelli O'Hara)
4. "Merry Christmas Darling" (with Chris Botti)
5. "The Christmas Waltz"
6. "Who Knows Where the Time Goes?" (with Brad Mehldau)
7. "Sleigh Ride" (with Wynton Marsalis)
8. "Snowbound" (with Kurt Elling)
9. "In the Bleak Midwinter" (with Rufus Wainwright)
10. "Central Park Serenade" (with Gregory Porter)
11. "The Man with the Bag"
12. "Love and Hard Times" (with Brad Mehldau)
13. "Still, still, still" (with Kurt Elling)

== Charts ==
Chart performance for Christmas in New York
Chart (2014)	Peak position
US Classical Crossover Albums (Billboard)	4
US Heatseekers Albums (Billboard)	1
US Top Current Album Sales (Billboard)	131
US Top Holiday Albums (Billboard)	17

== Personnel ==
- Renée Fleming – vocals
- Chris Botti
- Kurt Elling – vocals
- Wynton Marsalis – trumpet
- Brad Mehldau – piano
- Kelli O'Hara – vocals
- Gregory Porter – vocals
- Rufus Wainwright
