= Il Piccolo Teatro dell'Opera =

Il Piccolo Teatro dell'Opera was a small professional opera company located in New York City. Founded in 1984 by Barbara Elliott, the company's goal was to foster an interest in opera in today's culture and provide performance opportunities for young professional singers just starting out in their opera careers. Notable singers to have performed with the company include Renée Fleming, Douglas Perry, and Jianyi Zhang. The company produced operas from the baroque period to contemporary pieces. From 1984 through 1997 its chairman was Stephen Zelnick. The company has also had the privilege of being supported in benefit concerts or performances by such individuals as Tony Randall, Paul Sorvino, Luciano Pavarotti, Samuel Ramey, Gian Carlo Menotti, and Mirella Freni, among others. With the passing of Mme. Elliott in 1997, the company withdrew from the New York opera scene.
