= Knoxville: Summer of 1915 =

Composition for voice and orchestra by Samuel Barber

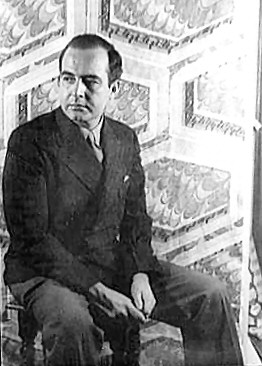
Samuel Barber in 1944

Knoxville: Summer of 1915, Op. 24, is a 1947 work for voice and orchestra by Samuel Barber, with text from a 1938 short prose piece by James Agee. The work was commissioned by soprano Eleanor Steber, who premiered it in 1948 with the Boston Symphony Orchestra under Serge Koussevitzky. Although the piece is traditionally sung by a soprano, it may also be sung by tenor. The text is in the persona of a male child.

== Description ==
Samuel Barber's Knoxville: Summer of 1915 is a lush, richly textured work. Setting music to excerpts from "Knoxville: Summer of 1915", a 1938 prose poem by James Agee that later became a preamble to his posthumously published, Pulitzer Prize-winning book, A Death in the Family (1957), Barber paints an idyllic, nostalgic picture of Agee's native Knoxville, Tennessee. The preamble is a simple, dreamlike depiction of an evening in the American South, narrated by a child who seems, at times, to transform into an adult. It is difficult to tell at times the identity of the speaker, enhancing the dreamlike quality of the work.

Knoxville is set in one movement, and the composer described it as "lyric rhapsody". It broadly conforms to the "ABA" pattern suggested by the text, and is rondo-like in form, with "several interconnected sections, tied together with a recurring refrain". Barber's choice to compose in a relatively free large-scale form parallels Agee's own choice in developing his work; both represent the fruits of a spontaneous improvisation, fueled by a moving nostalgia:

I was greatly interested in improvisatory writing, as against carefully composed, multiple-draft writing: i.e., with a kind of parallel to improvisation in jazz, to a certain kind of "genuine" lyric which I thought should be purely improvised ... It took possibly an hour and a half; on revision, I stayed about 98 per cent faithful to my rule, for these "improvised" experiments, against any revision whatever.

— James Agee, "Program Notes of the Boston Symphony Orchestra"

== Genesis ==
1915 was a significant year for James Agee. He was five. It was the last year his family was intact; his father died in an automobile accident in 1916, and the remaining family members left Knoxville, never to return. According to Agee, it was the point around which his life began to evolve. After Barber and Agee met, Barber noted that the two had much in common.

We are talking now of summer evenings in Knoxville, Tennessee in the time that I lived there so successfully disguised to myself as a child. It was a little bit mixed sort of block, fairly solidly lower middle class, with one or two juts apiece on either side of that. The houses corresponded: middlesized gracefully fretted wood houses built in the late nineties and early nineteen hundreds, with small front and side and more spacious back yards, and trees in the yards.

== Agee's text as excerpted by Barber ==
Barber chose only excerpts of "Knoxville" for his composition, but his Knoxville, Summer of 1915, in many ways, parallels Agee's text. Agee was touched by the death of his father in his childhood, while Barber was, during the time of composition, enduring his father's deteriorating health. The two men were similarly aged. Most importantly, however, the two men were so compelled by nostalgia and inspiration that they (supposedly) wrote their pieces quickly and without much revision.

In a 1949 radio interview, Barber said, “[M]y musical response that summer of 1947 was immediate and intense. I think I must have composed Knoxville within a few days... You see, it expresses a child’s feelings of loneliness, wonder and lack of identity in that marginal world between twilight and sleep.”.

=== Summary ===
The text of Knoxville, Summer of 1915 does not tell a story. It is a poetic evocation of life as seen from the perspective of a small boy. It is full of alliteration ("people in pairs", "parents on porches", "sleep, soft smiling", "low on the length of lawns"). The point is that nothing is happening; the adults sit on the porch and talk "of nothing in particular, of nothing at all". Their voices are "gentle and meaningless, like the voices of sleeping birds". A horse and a buggy go by, a loud auto, a quiet auto, a noisy streetcar. The members of the family lie on quilts, in the yard (as was not unusual on a hot summer evening, before air conditioning). "The stars are wide and alive, they seem each like a smile of great sweetness, and they seem very near". The family members are described as a child would, quoting a grown-up: "One is an artist, he is living at home. One is a musician, she is living at home." The key people are the parents, his father and mother, who are both "good to me". The boy is "one familiar and well-beloved in that home". The text foreshadows some tragedy to come: "May God bless my people, my uncle, my aunt, my mother, my good father, oh, remember them kindly in their time of trouble; and in the hour of their taking away".

The boy includes philosophical commentary: "By some chance, here they are, all on this earth; and who shall ever tell the sorrow of being on this earth, lying, on quilts, on the grass, in a summer evening, among the sounds of the night". He is "taken in and put to bed", and is received by sleep. Yet the one thing he can never learn in that house, that no one will ever tell him, is "who I am". With this sense of lack, the piece ends.

== Musical structure ==
The beginning of the piece, describing a warm summer's evening, is particularly lyrical in comparison to Agee's earlier passages in the same work. Barber capitalizes on the lyricism of this section through his use of word painting: "Talking casually" in measures 23–24, "increasing moan" in measures 65–66, "the faint stinging bell rises again ..." in measure 79.

The introduction concludes, and the reverie is interrupted abruptly; we are thrown into an allegro agitato, where Barber carries a simple horn-like motive in the woodwinds and horns. Staccato and pizzicato lines add to the chaos. Like the introduction, the imagery is vivid but intangible yet—this passage has all the clearness of a dream, but we are unclear what it means. The soprano again clarifies the imagery: "a streetcar raising its iron moan; stopping, belling and starting; stertorous; rousing and raising again its iron increasing moan". The noisy, metallic texture persists, interrupted by a notably pointed excursion, "like a small malignant spirit set to dog its tracks." Describing the spark above the trolley car as a spirit following it closely, Barber uses staccato woodwinds and pizzicato strings in walking chromaticism to illustrate this image.

After the streetcar fades, the soprano begins a lyrical passage "now is the night one blue dew." Here the soprano reaches the highest note of the entire work, a B♭ sung piano. After this, we return to a rough interpretation of the first theme; this time the harp carries the "rocking" theme alone. This brief return to familiarity smoothly transitions into a passage where the narrator has changed from describing the summer's eve to contemplating grander things: "On the rough wet grass of the back yard my father and mother have spread quilts"... As was common before air conditioning, people would spend evenings outside their houses. Here adults and the narrator are lying down on quilts, talking sparsely and idly. In relative silence, the narrator, still a child, contemplates the vastness of the stars and "my people," sitting quietly with "larger bodies than mine". Thematically, the orchestra is closest to the introductory section before the rocking, consisting of a repetitive exchange between the bassoon and the other woodwinds.

The section ends particularly poignantly, with the narrator counting off the people present, ending with "One is my father who is good to me." The orchestra breaks into an agitated section, characterized musically by leaps of ninths and seconds. We see here that the text has struck a chord with Barber, whose father was grievously ill at the time, drawing a parallel between Agee's father (his text is "strictly autobiographical") in 1915 and Samuel Barber's father at the time of writing in 1947.

The childlike recollection of the summer's evening now turns abruptly, seriously "who shall ever tell the sorrow of being on this earth," again hitting the high B♭. The narrator then asks for the blessing of the aforementioned people, and moves into a final re-entry of the original theme, while the narrator talks about being put to bed. The piece ends with the instruments calmly rising, almost floating, reinforcing the dreamlike aspects of the piece.

== Premiere ==
Knoxville: Summer of 1915 was premiered on April 9, 1948, by Eleanor Steber and the Boston Symphony Orchestra conducted by Serge Koussevitzky. The performance was met with mixed reviews.

Barber was not present at the premiere (he was committed to work at the American Academy in Rome at the time, and the performance could not be rescheduled). Koussevitzky wired to him noting that the performance was "an outstanding success and made a deep impression on all". While Koussevitzky never performed the work again, it has remained popular over the years.

While the vocal part is typically sung by a soprano, it is also sometimes sung by a tenor. One such performance of the work with a tenor soloist took place in 2004 at the Lanaudière Festival with Anthony Dean Griffey and the Montreal Symphony, conducted by JoAnn Falletta.

== Discography ==
- Eleanor Steber, album Barber: Knoxville: Summer of 1915, Columbia Masterworks, 1950 (ML2174); conductor William Strickland with the Dumbarton Oaks Chamber Orchestra).
- Eleanor Steber, album Eleanor Steber in Concert (1956–1958), VAI Audio, 1958.
- Eleanor Steber, album Barber: Knoxville: Summer of 1915, Stand Records, 1961.
- Evelyn Lear, album "A Celebration of Twentieth-Century Song," VAI Audio, 1960.
- Leontyne Price, album Leontyne Price Sings Barber, RCA Red Seal, 1968.
- Dawn Upshaw, Orchestra of St. Luke's, David Zinman, album Knoxville Summer of 1915, Nonesuch, 1989.
- Sylvia McNair, Atlanta Symphony Orchestra, Yoel Levi, album The Best of Barber, Telarc CD-80250, 1993.
- Kathleen Battle, album Honey & Rue, DG, 1995.
- Roberta Alexander, album Barber: Scenes & Arias, Etcetera, 1992.
- Barbara Hendricks, album Copland, Barber, EMI, 1994.
- Karina Gauvin, album Barber, Naxos, 2002.
- Measha Brueggergosman, album So Much to Tell, CBC Records, 2004.
- Anne-Catherine Gillet, album Barber, Berlioz, Britten, Aeon, 2011.
- April Fredrick, album April Fredrick Sings Copland, Barber, Gershwin, Somm, 2012.
- Renée Fleming, album Distant Light, Decca, 2017.
- Jill Gomez, City of London Sinfonia, Richard Hickox, CD album Gershwin Copland Barber, Virgin Classics VC 7 90766-2, 1989.
