= Iain Hamilton (composer) =

Scottish composer (1922–2000)

- Born: 6 June 1922; Glasgow, UK
- Died: 21 July 2000 (aged 78)
- Education: Royal Academy of Music; University of London
- Occupations: Composer; Academic teacher
- Organizations: Morley College; Duke University

Iain Ellis Hamilton (6 June 1922 – 21 July 2000) was a prolific Scottish composer of ten operas, four symphonies, four string quartets and much more. He worked in the United States for twenty years.

== Career ==
Hamilton was born in Glasgow and educated in London, where he became an apprentice engineer. He remained in that profession for the next seven years, studying music in his spare time. In 1947 he won a scholarship to attend the Royal Academy of Music for three years, studying composition with William Alwyn and piano with Harold Craxton. Simultaneously he earned a Bachelor of Music degree from the University of London (1950), and he was later awarded an honorary Doctorate of Music from the University of Glasgow (1970).

In 1951 Hamilton became a lecturer at both Morley College and the University of London, posts he held until 1960, when he moved to New York. There he was appointed Mary Duke Biddle Professor at Duke University, North Carolina. In 1971 he was also appointed to the Cramb lectureship at the University of Glasgow. He returned to London in 1981, but struggled to regain a place in the mainstream of UK musical life, although his orchestral work Commedia was performed at the BBC Proms in 1993. He died in London, aged 78.

== Music ==
Hamilton's early works, romantic in style but using a highly chromatic form of tonality, included many large scale orchestral works in traditional forms. In 1951 his Symphony No 2 won the Koussevitzky Foundation Award and his Clarinet Concerto (premiered by Frederick Thurston) the Royal Philharmonic Society Prize. Other works from this period include the Violin Concerto (1952) and the Symphonic Variations (1953). While some of the vocal and chamber music use a simpler, more diatonic style (such as the Four Border Songs for choir (1953), the longer term direction was towards serialism, as in the Cello Sonata (1958–9) and the Sinfonia for two orchestras (1959), which according to The Musical Times "shocked a conservative Edinburgh Festival audience".

In the 1960s Hamilton composed two operas, Agamemnon and The Royal Hunt of the Sun, using texts he adapted from literary sources. The latter was premiered and revived by English National Opera. A later opera, The Catiline Conspiracy, was first performed by Scottish Opera in 1974 and marked a return to tonality, also evident in a further opera, Anna Karenina (1978) and in the Third and Fourth Symphonies (both composed in 1981). Conrad Wilson wrote that "inside Hamilton there was always a romantic composer struggling to get out ... it finally exploded in Anna Karenina, a poignantly Mahlerian treatment of Tolstoy's novel." Other late works include the orchestral Bulgaria: Invocation/Evocation (1999) and London: a kaleidoscope for piano and orchestra.

== Works ==
=== Chamber and solo instrument ===
- Antigone for wind octet (1991)
- Aria for horn and piano
- Brass Quintet (by 1991)
- Capriccio for trumpet and piano
- Cello Sonata No. 1, Op. 39 (1958–59)
- Cello Sonata No. 2 (1974)
- Clarinet Quintet No. 1 (1948)
- Clarinet Quintet No. 2, Sea Music (1974)
- Clarinet Sonata, Op. 22 (1955)
- Five Scenes for trumpet and piano (1966)
- Flute Quartet, Op. 12 (1951)
- Flute Sonata (1966)
- Hyperion for five players (1977) (Cl., Hn., Vln., Vcl., Pno.)
- In Summer for oboe and piano (1999)
- Oboe Sonata (1991)
- Octet for Paragon Ensemble (Fl., Ob., Cl., Bsn., Hn., Tpt., Tbn., Bar.)
- Octet for Strings (1954)
- Piano Quartet for (1993–98)
- Piano Quintet (1993)
- Piano Trio, Op. 25 (1956)
- Serenata for violin and clarinet (1955)
- Sextet for flute, two clarinets, violin, cello and piano
- Sonata for Five (1966) (Fl., Ob., Cl., Bsn., Hn.)
- Sonata Notturna for horn and piano
- Spirits of the Air for solo bass trombone (1977)
- Spring Days for flute and piano (1996)
- String Quartet No. 1, op. 5 (by 1952)
- String Quartet No. 2 (by 1965–71)
- String Quartet No. 3 (1984)
- String Quartet No. 4 (1984)
- String Sextet (1988) (2Vln., 2Vla., 2Vcl.)
- The Chaining of Prometheus for band or large wind ensemble (1963)
- Three Nocturnes for clarinet and piano, Op.6
- Viola Sonata, Op. 9 (1950–1)
- Violin Sonata (1974)
- Wild Garden, five pieces for clarinet and piano

=== Choral ===
- A Hymn to the Virgin (SATB and Pno.)
- The Bermudas for baritone, SATB chorus and orchestra, Op. 33 (1957)
- The Bright Heavens Sounding (1985) (SATB soloists and chorus, Fl., 2 Ob., Bsn., 2 Hn., 2 Tpt. in C, Str.)
- Christ's Nativity for SATB and organ (1989)
- The Convergence of the Twain for SATB and piano (1985)
- Cradle Song for SATB and piano
- Epitaph for This World and Time (1970)
- Four Border Songs, Op. 20 for choir (1953)
- The Fray of Support for SATB chorus, a cappella, Op. 21
- The Golden Sequence (1973) (SATB chorus, congregation and organ)
- Mass in A (1980) (SSATTB, a cappella)
- The Morning Watch for mixed chorus and 10 winds (Poems by Henry Vaughan)
- Nocturnal for SATB Chorus
- St Mark's Passion (SATB soloists, chorus and orchestra)
- Prometheus for soprano, mezzo, tenor and baritone soloists, SATB chorus and orchestra (1986)
- Requiem for mixed chorus, a cappella (1979)
- The Summer Fields: Six Sonnets of John Clare
- *Midsummer
  - Careless Rambles
  - Summer Happiness
  - The Heat of Noon
  - The Nightingale
  - Twilight in Summer
- Te Deum, Homage to Venice for mixed chorus, wind ensemble and percussion (1973–1974)
- To Columbus (1975) (mixed chorus, 3Tpt., 3Tbn., 3Perc.)
- Vespers, 1980 (1980) (mixed chorus, 2Pno., Hp., Perc.)

=== Orchestral ===
- 1912, light overture, op. 38 (by 1958)
- 1912 (1963) (rescoring of the overture "1912" for concert band)
- Alastor (1970), tribute to Shelley
- Alexandrian Sequence for chamber orchestra (1976)
- Arias for chamber orchestra
- Aurora (1975), nocturne and scherzo
- Bartholomew Fair, overture, Op. 17
- Bulgaria: Invocation/Evocation (1999)
- Cantos
- Circus for two trumpets and orchestra (1969)
- Clarinet Concerto, Op. 7 (by 1950–1)
- Cleopatra, dramatic scene for soprano and orchestra (1977)
- Commedia, Concerto for Orchestra (1972)
- Ecossaise for Orchestra
- Harp Concerto (1992)
- In Changing Light: Four Impressions (1993)
- Jazz Trumpet Concerto, Op. 37
- Jubilee
- London: Kaleidoscope for piano and orchestra
- Organ Concerto (1964)
- Piano Concerto No. 1 (1967)
- Piano Concerto No. 2 (by 1987–8)
- Scottish Dances, Op. 32
- Sinfonia for Two Orchestras
- Sinfonia concertante for violin, viola and chamber orchestra
- Sonata for chamber orchestra, Op. 34
- Sonatas and Variants for orchestra
- Sonatas and Variants for 10 Winds (1966) series)
- Symphonic Variations, Op. 19
- Symphony No. 1 "Cyrano de Bergerac" (1948–1949)
- Symphony No. 2 (1951)
- Symphony No. 3 in G "Spring" (1981)
- Symphony No. 4 in B (1979–1981)
- The Transit of Jupiter (1995)
- Variations on an Original Theme, for strings, Op. 1
- Violin Concerto No. 1, Op. 15 (1952)
- Violin Concerto No. 2, Amphion (1971)
- Voyage for horn and chamber orchestra (1970)

=== Organ ===
- A Vision of Canopus (1975)
- Aubade (1965)
- Fanfares and Variants
- Le Tombeau de Bach Eight Reflections on Six Chorales (1986)
- Paraphrase, based on the music for organs in Epitaph for This World and Time (1970)
- Roman Music
- Threnos: In Time of War (1966)

=== Piano ===
- A Book Of Watercolours for Piano Solo (1993)
- A Field of Butterflies for Piano Solo (1990)
- Denislav's Diary: Scenes from Childhood for Piano Solo (1995)
- Le Jardin de Monet nine movements for piano solo (1986)
- Months and Metamorphoses, three volumes
- Nocturnes with Cadenzas for Piano
- Palinodes for Piano Solo (1972)
- Sonata No. 1 for Piano Solo (1951, rev. 1971)
- Sonata No. 2 for Piano Solo (1973)
- Sonata No. 3 for Piano Solo (1978)
- Three Piano Pieces, Op. 30

=== Stage and opera ===
- Agamemnon (1987)
- Anna Karenina (1978)
- Lancelot (1982–1983)
- London's Fair (1992)
- On the Eve (1980–1996)
- Pharsalia (Dramatic Commentary) (1968)
- Raleigh's Dream (1983)
- Tamberlaine (lyric drama for radio) (1976)
- The Catiline Conspiracy (1973)
- The Royal Hunt of the Sun (1968)
- The Tragedy of Macbeth (1994)

=== Vocal ===
- A Testament of War for baritone and orchestra
- Cantata No. 1 for tenor and piano (1957)
- Dialogues for soprano and five instruments
- Five Love Songs for high voice and orchestra, Op. 36
- Five Lyrics of Torquato Tasso for baritone and piano (1973)
- Love is Life's Spring (John Clare) for soprano and piano
- Paris de Crépuscule à l'aube, six settings of Baudelaire for voice and orchestra
- Ricordanza for high voice and orchestra (1981)
- Songs of Summer for high voice and piano (1954)
- The Spirit of Delight: Songs of Life, Love and Death (1978)
