= List of television operas =

This is a list of operas specifically composed and produced for television performance. It does not include productions of the established opera repertoire subsequently broadcast on television.

Year of premiere	Composed	Composer	Opera title	Librettist and/or source(s)	Television station
1938		Spike Hughes	Cinderella	Spike Hughes	BBC Television
1947		Spike Hughes	St Patrick's Day	Richard Brinsley Sheridan	BBC Television
1951		Gian Carlo Menotti	Amahl and the Night Visitors	Gian Carlo Menotti	NBC
1952		Malcolm Arnold	The Dancing Master	Joe Mendoza, based on the play by William Wycherley	BBC (rejected)
1953		Bohuslav Martinů	The Marriage	Bohuslav Martinů	NBC
1953		Bohuslav Martinů	What Men Live By	Bohuslav Martinů	NBC
1954		Bernard Herrmann	A Christmas Carol	Maxwell Anderson after Charles Dickens	CBS
1955		Lukas Foss	Griffelkin	Alastair Reid	NBC
1955		Walter Kaufmann	Christmas Slippers	Betty Marsh	Winnipeg
1956		Norman Dello Joio	The Trial at Rouen	Norman Dello Joio	NBC
1956		Leonard Kastle	The Swing	Leonard Kastle	NBC
1956		Arthur Benjamin	Mañana	Caryl Brahms	BBC Television
1956		Malcolm Arnold	The Open Window	Sidney Gilliat	BBC Television
1957		Joan Trimble	Blind Raftery	Cedric Cliffe, based on the novel by Donn-Byrne	BBC Television
1957		Stanley Hollingsworth	La Grande Bretèche	Stanley Hollingsworth	NBC
1959		Richard Arnell	The Petrified Princess	Richard Arnell	BBC Television
1959		Guy Halahan	The Spur of the Moment	Joe Mendoza, after Frank Baker, Miss Hargreaves	BBC Television
1959		Gian Carlo Menotti	Maria Golovin	Gian Carlo Menotti	NBC
1959		Lee Hoiby	Beatrice	Marci Nardi	WAVE
1959		Ezra Laderman	Sarah	Clair Rascom	CBS
1959		Heinrich Sutermeister	Seraphine (Die stümme Apothekerin)	Heinrich Sutermeister, after François Rabelais's Gargantua and Pantagruel	Schweizer Fernsehen
1959		Henk Badings	Salto mortale	Henk Badings and Belcampo (Herman Pieter Schönfeld Wichers)	Nederlandse Omroep Stichting
1959		Paul Angerer	Passkontrolle		ORF
1960		Arthur Bliss	Tobias and the Angel	Christopher Hassall	BBC Television
1961		Leonard Kastle	Deseret	Anne Howard Bailey	NBC
1961		Jean Prodromidès	Les Perses (The Persians)	Jean Prat, after Aeschylus	RTF
1962		Igor Stravinsky	The Flood	Robert Craft	CBS
1962		Phyllis Tate	Dark Pilgrimage	Phyllis Tate	BBC Television
1962		Edwin Coleman	A Christmas Carol	Margaret Burns Harris, after Charles Dickens	BBC Television
1962		Riccardo Malipiero	Battono alla porta	Dino Buzzati	RAI
1963		Ben McPeek	The Bargain	Ben McPeek	CBC Television
1963		Gian Carlo Menotti	Labyrinth	Gian Carlo Menotti	NBC
1963		Carlisle Floyd	The Sojourner and Mollie Sinclair	Carlisle Floyd	NCE
1963		Ton de Leeuw	Alceste	Euripides	Nederlandse Omroep Stichting
1964		Heinrich Sutermeister	Das Gespenst von Canterville	Heinrich Sutermeister, after Oscar Wilde's "The Canterville Ghost"	Mainz, ZDF
1965		David Amram	The Final Ingredient	Arnold Weinstein	ABC
1965		Mark Bucci	The Hero	Mark Bucci	National Educational Television
1965		Carl Davis	The Arrangement	Leo Lehman	BBC Television
1965		Gian Carlo Menotti	Martin's Lie	Gian Carlo Menotti	CBS
1966		R. Murray Schafer	Loving	R. Murray Schafer	CBC Television
1966		sl:Kruno Cipci	Doktor Petelin	Fran Žižek	TV Ljubljana
1967		Ezra Laderman	The Trials of Galileo	Joe Darion	CBS Television
1967		Ingvar Lidholm	Holländaren (The Dutchman)	after August Strindberg	Sveriges Television
1967		Christopher Whelen	Some Place of Darkness	John Hopkins	BBC Television
1968		Roman Vlad	La fantarca	Giuseppe Berto's La fantarca (1965)	RAI
1968		Norman Kay	The Rose Affair	After the novel by Alun Owen	BBC Television
1969		Thomas Eastwood	The Rebel	Ronald Duncan	BBC Television
1969		Heinrich Sutermeister	La croisade des enfants (The Children's Crusade)	Heinrich Sutermeister, after Marcel Schwob	TvR
1970		Jack Beeson	My Heart's in the Highlands	Jack Beeson	PBS
1971		Heinrich Sutermeister	Das Flaschenteufel	Kurt Weibel, after Robert Louis Stevenson's The Bottle Imp	Mainz, ZDF
1971	1969–70	Benjamin Britten	Owen Wingrave	Myfanwy Piper, after Henry James	BBC Two
1971		Ezra Laderman	And David Wept	Joe Darion, after the Biblical story of David and Bathsheba	CBS Television
1973		John Eaton	Myshkin	Patrick Creagh after Dostoevsky's The Idiot	PBS
1976		Alun Hoddinott	Murder, The Magician	John Morgan	HTV
1976		Godfrey Ridout	The Lost Child	John Reid	CBC Television
1976		Raymond Pannell	Aberfan	Beverly Pannell	CBC Television
1977		Carl Davis	Orpheus in the Underworld	John Wells	BBC Television
1978		Norman Kay	A Christmas Carol	John Morgan, after Charles Dickens	HTV
1979		Alun Hoddinott	The Rajah's Diamond	Myfanwy Piper, from R. L. Stevenson's New Arabian Nights	BBC Television
1982		Peter Sculthorpe	Quiros	Brian Bell	ABC Television
1984		Robert Ashley	Perfect Lives	Robert Ashley	Channel Four
1990		Salvador Brotons	Reverend Everyman	Gary Corseri, from Hofmannsthal's Jedermann	WFSU-TV
1991		Michael Nyman	Letters, Riddles and Writs	Jeremy Newson and Pat Gavin	BBC Television
1993		Stewart Copeland	Horse Opera	Jonathan Moore	Channel Four
1993		Anthony Moore	Camera	Peter Blegvad	Channel Four
1994	1991–92	Gerald Barry	The Triumph of Beauty and Deceit	Meredith Oakes	Channel Four
1994	1992	Orlando Gough	The Empress	David Gale, from Wedekind	Channel Four
1995	1993	Michael Torke	King of Hearts	Christopher Rawlence	Channel Four
1995		Mike Westbrook Kate Westbrook	Good Friday, 1663	Helen Simpson	Channel Four
2005		Judith Weir	Armida	Judith Weir	Channel Four
2006		Jonathan Dove	Man on the Moon	Nicholas Wright	Channel Four
2006		Alexina Louie	Burnt Toast: 8 Mini Comic Operas About Love	Dan Redican	CBC Television
2015		Elena Kats-Chernin	The Divorce	Joanna Murray-Smith	ABC TV (Australia)

== See also ==
- List of radio operas
- Radio opera
