= John McCollum =

American opera tenor (1922–2015)

John M. McCollum (February 21, 1922 – October 30, 2015) was an American tenor who had an active singing career in operas, concerts, and recitals during the 1950s through the 1970s. As an opera singer he performed with companies throughout North America, mostly working with second tier opera houses. He was much more successful as a singer of oratorios and other works from the concert repertoire, and enjoyed a particularly productive and lengthy relationship with the Boston Symphony Orchestra. As a concert singer he sang a wide repertoire but drew particular acclaim for his performances in the works of Johann Sebastian Bach and George Frideric Handel.

== Early life and career ==
Born in Coalinga, California, McCollum first worked as a journalist and magazine publisher before deciding to pursue a singing career. He began studying voice with Mynard Jones in Oakland, California and then moved to New York City in the early 1950s where he became a pupil of Edgar Schofield. He also studied at the Tanglewood Music Center under Boris Goldovsky.

McCollum made his first concert appearance in New York City as the tenor soloist in a production of Felix Mendelssohn's Elijah at the Church of the Ascension in November 1951 with soprano Beverly Wolff and bass-baritone Paul King. In 1952 he tied for first place in the American Theatre Wing's singing contest with soprano Helen Clayton. That same year he made his Carnegie Hall debut singing Prince Vasiliy Ivanovich Shuysky in a concert version of Modest Mussorgsky's Boris Godunov with conductor Dimitri Mitropoulos and the New York Philharmonic. In 1953 he made his first appearance in a staged opera as Fenton in Giuseppe Verdi's Falstaff with Goldovsky's New England Opera Theatre. That same year he made his first appearance with the Boston Symphony Orchestra as the tenor soloist in Hector Berlioz's Roméo et Juliette with soprano Jennie Tourel.

During the mid-1950s McCollum was highly busy performing as a concert soloist and performed with some frequency in operas with the New England Opera Theatre (NEOT). He sang frequently with the Boston Symphony Orchestra under conductor Charles Munch, often at the Tanglewood Music Festival, performing works like the role of the evangelist in Bach's Johannes Passion (1956). He was also a regular performer with the Dessoff Choirs under conductor Paul Boepple, performing as a tenor soloist in oratorios like Handel's Messiah (1956) and Handel's Israel in Egypt (1957). One work which he performed with frequency during these years was J.S. Bach's Mass in B Minor, which he first performed in February 1955 with the Chicago Symphony Orchestra under conductor Margaret Hillis. He later performed the work with the Boston Symphony Orchestra at Tanglewood in the summer of 1955 and with the Philadelphia Orchestra at the Bethlehem Bach Festival in 1956. In March 1955 he sang Helenus in a lauded production of Berlioz's Les Troyens with the New England Opera Theater opposite Eunice Alberts as Cassandre, Marriquita Moll as Dido, and Arthur Schoep as Aeneas.

The year 1958 proved to be a banner year for McCollum. In April of that year he was the tenor soloist in Haydn's The Creation with sopranos Adele Addison and Louise Natale, baritone Mack Harrell, the New York Philharmonic, and conductor Robert Shaw. Later that month he sang Ferrando in Mozart's Così fan tutte with the Washington Opera Society in Washington, D.C. The following June he made his European debut at the very first Festival dei Due Mondi as Reuel in the world premiere of Lee Hoiby's chamber opera The Scarf with Patricia Neway and Richard Cross. In August he performed the title role in Gioacchino Rossini's Le comte Ory at Tanglewood and in October he performed in Thomas Arne's rarely heard opera Comus with The Little Orchestra Society. In 1959 McCollum performed Handel's Ode for St. Cecilia's Day with the New York Philharmonic under conductor Leonard Bernstein. He also returned to Tanglewood to perform with the Boston Symphony Orchestra in Berlioz's Requiem.

== Later life and career ==
Up to this point in his career, McCollum had mainly been busy performing as a concert singer and had not spent the majority of his time performing in operas. This began to change in early 1960s when he began to perform much more frequently in operas, although his concert career remained active. He performed with companies across North America during the 1960s, including the Opera Company of Boston, the Canadian Opera Company, the Cincinnati Opera, the Seattle Opera, the Washington National Opera, and Vancouver Opera among others. He sang four roles with the Santa Fe Opera during the 1962 summer season: Ferrando, the second tenor in Igor Stravinsky's Renard, The Fisherman in Stravinsky's The Nightingale, and Alfredo in La traviata. He remained active with the Boston Symphony Orchestra during the 1960s, performing in concerts of Berlioz's La damnation de Faust and Beethoven's Symphony No. 9 among others.

The year 1963 was an important year for McCollum's opera life. He began the year singing Licinius in Gaspare Spontini's rarely heard opera La Vestale for his debut with the American Opera Society at Carnegie Hall. This was followed by an offer from Julius Rudel, then director of the New York City Opera, to join the roster of principal tenors at his company. McCollum accepted and made his debut with the company in October 1963 as Don Ottavio in Mozart's Don Giovanni. Then in December he recorded the role of King Kaspar in Gian Carlo Menotti's Amahl and the Night Visitors in a television production made by the NBC Opera Theatre. He returned for one more opera with the New York City Opera in 1964, the world premiere of Lee Hoiby's Natalia Petrovna.

After the 1960s McCollum's career began to slow down. He appeared mostly in concerts during the early 1970s and did not perform much after the mid-1970s. He taught for many years on the voice faculty of the University of Michigan. He died in October 2015 at the age of 93.
