= The Scarf (opera) =

The Scarf is a chamber opera in one act by composer Lee Hoiby. The work uses an English libretto by Harry Duncan that is based on the short story The Witch by Anton Chekhov. Composed in 1955, the opera premiered on June 20, 1958 at the very first Festival dei Due Mondi in Spoleto, Italy in a production by Gian Carlo Menotti and conducted by Reinhard Peters. The cast included Patricia Neway as Miriam, John McCollum as Reuel, and Richard Cross as the Postman. The work received its American premiere the following year at the New York City Opera.
