= Adoration of the Magi (Bosch, Madrid) =

Triptych by Hieronymus Bosch

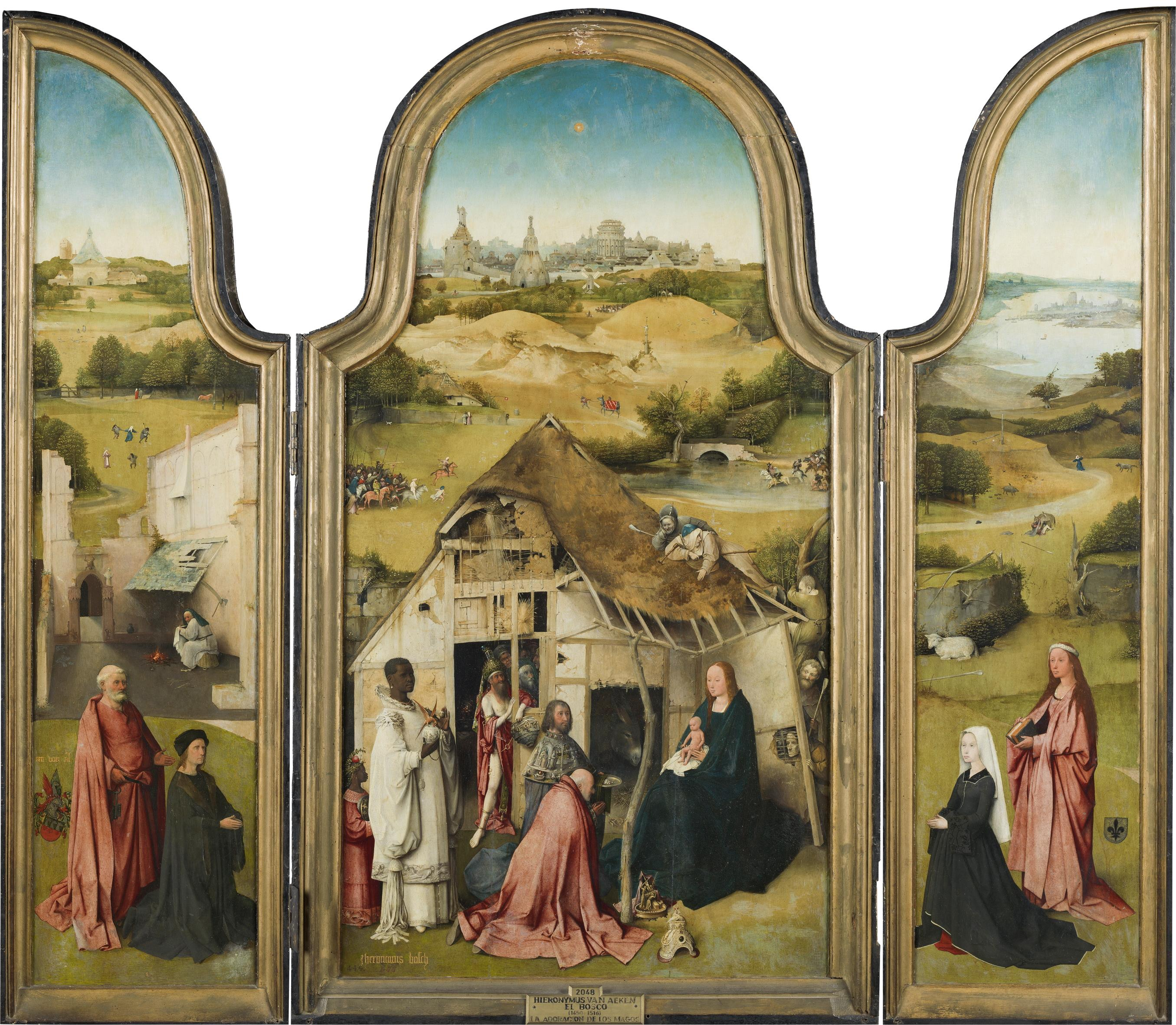
- Artist: Hieronymus Bosch
- Year: c. 1485–1500
- Medium: Oil on panel
- Dimensions: 138 cm × 144 cm (54 in × 57 in)
- Location: Museo del Prado, Madrid

The Adoration of the Magi, or The Epiphany, is a triptych oil painting on wood panel by the Netherlandish artist Hieronymus Bosch, executed around 1485–1500. It is now in the Museo del Prado in Madrid, Spain.

== History ==
In about 1494, Peeter Scheyfve (–1507) and Agnes de Gramme (? – c. 1497) commissioned this altarpiece. They were wealthy burghers in Antwerp. The painting was in the El Escorial monastery, and was mentioned in 1605 as an "Epiphany without any extravaganza" by Fra Jose de Siguenza, and its being unlike Bosch's other work there. It has been at the Prado since 1839. The latest dendrochronological investigation (2016) has determined that the panels were produced after 1472 and most probably after 1474.

== Description ==
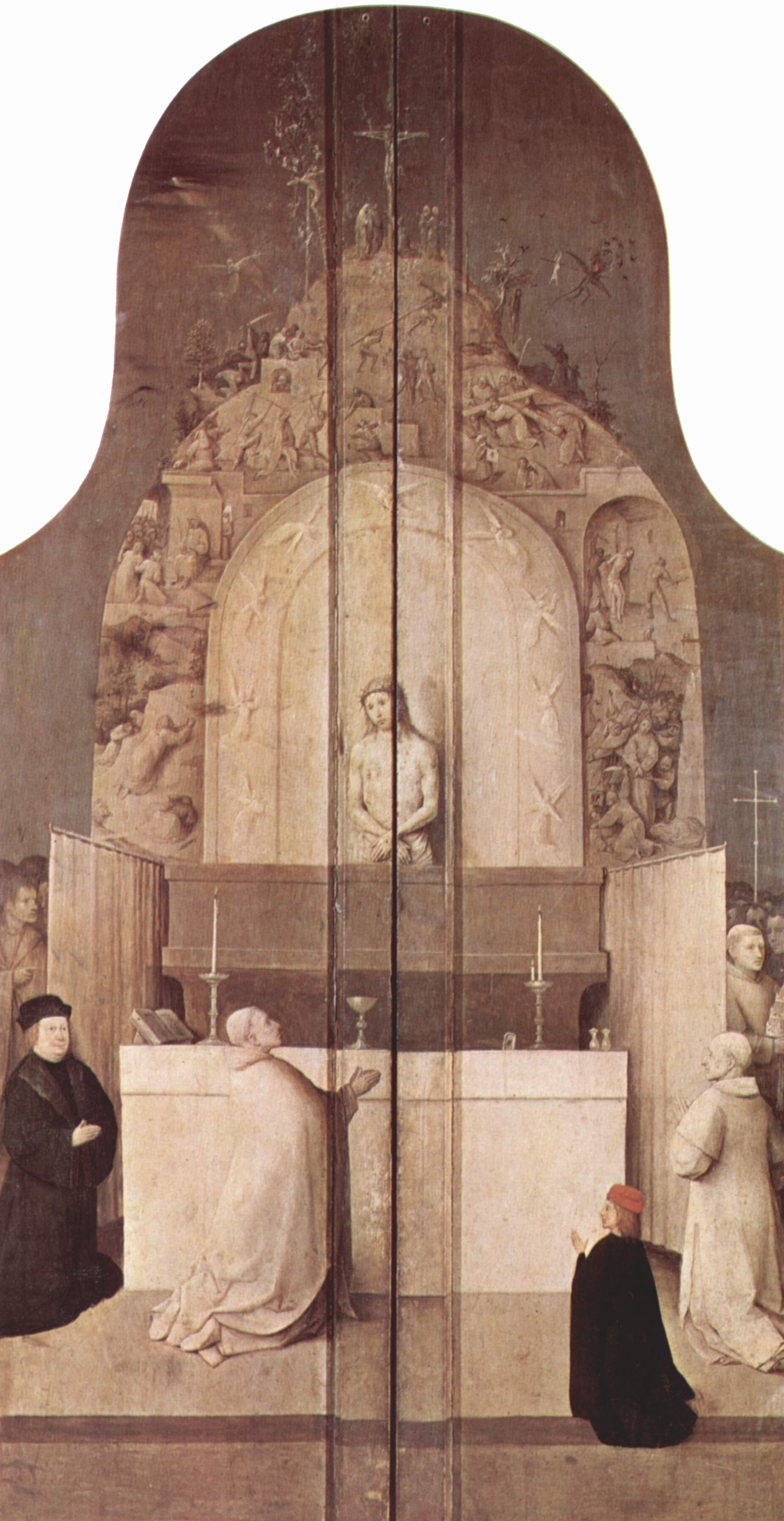
The closed triptych

=== Shutters ===
When closed, the triptych shutters showed externally a grisaille painting, depicting the Mass of Saint Gregory in a single scene: it features Gregory the Great kneeling at an altar in front of Christ. The latter is surrounded by an arch with flying angels. The two characters in color are a later addition, and are the painting's donors.

The frame contains scenes of the Life of Jesus: from the lower left, the Prayer in the Garden, The Arrest, Christ in Front of Pilatus, the Flagellation, the Coronation of Thorns, the Via Crucis and, finally, the Crucifixion. In the sky around the cross are a flying angel and a devil, with a red halo around his head, who is drawing Judas Iscariot's soul away. Judas is also visible hanging at the mountain's right edge, while a man is pointing at him.

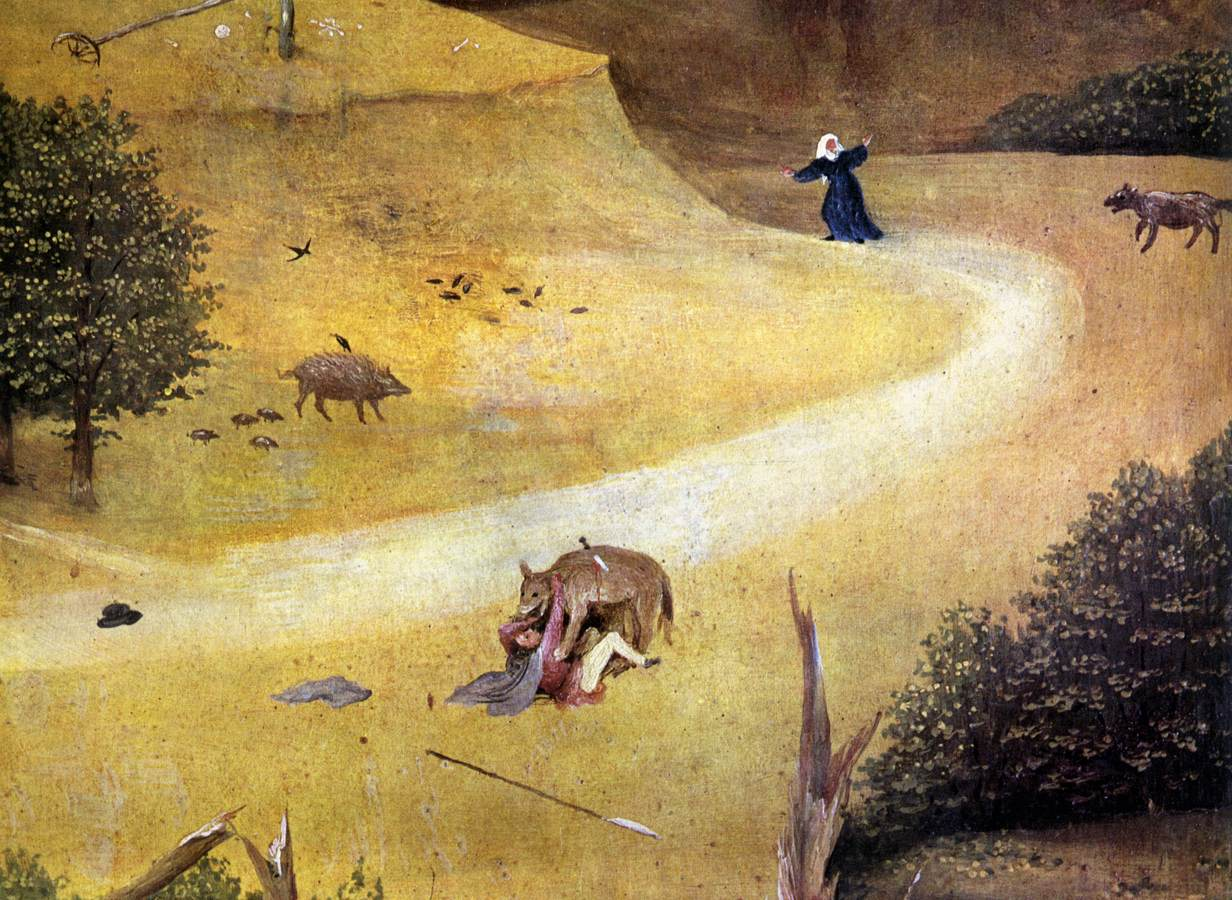
Detail of the beast attacking people in the right panel

=== Side panels ===
The left panel depicts St. Peter and one donor, identified as Peeter Scheyfve by the presence of his coat of arms, with the motto "Een voer al" ("One for all"). In the background, a man sits on a basket under a makeshift roofing: he is likely St. Joseph who heats Jesus' diapers (nappies).

In the right panel is St. Agnes and the eponymous donor, Agnes de Gramme, also accompanied by her coat of arms. In the background, a bear and a wolf attack some people.

=== Central panel ===
The central panel shows the Adoration of the Magi, depicted in accordance with traditional Early Netherlandish iconography. A monumental Mary sits outside a precarious hut, with the Child held at her womb. Melchior, the eldest of the Magi, is kneeling at her feet, with his gift before him: a sculpture of gold with the Sacrifice of Isaac, a forecast of Jesus' Passion. Below the object are several toads, symbols of heresy. Melchior's crown lies on the ground, an allusion to the powerlessness of earthly power against the celestial.

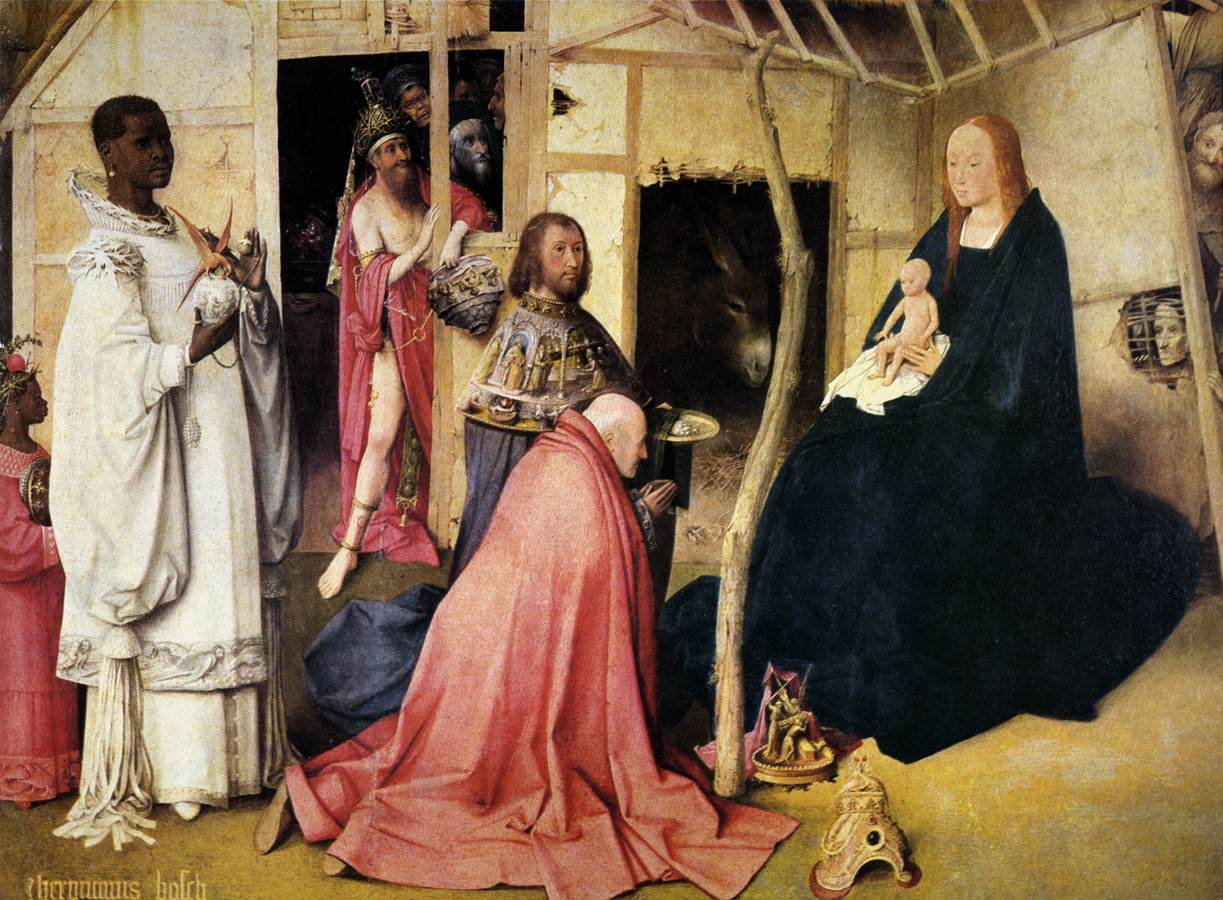
Detail of the central panel with the Magi

Caspar stands to the rear, with a depiction of the Visit of Queen Sheba to Solomon on his mantle. He brings frankincense on a vessel. Finally, the last of the Magi, the dark-skinned Balthazar, has white garments decorated by an embroidery resembling thorny leaves: brings a spherical pix whose reliefs depict the Offer of Water to King David, and which contains myrrh. Balthasar is accompanied by a dark-skinned servant.

An unusual element is represented by the partially naked figure at the hut's entrance, surrounded by other grotesque ones and characterized by a red mantle, a tiara with metallic twigs in the hand, and by a wheal at the left ankle, protected by a glass structure. This has been variously interpreted as either another prefiguration of the Passion, or as a symbol of the heresy looming the followers, or as the Judaic messiah which, after having been struck by leper, has become the Antichrist.

Other figures include the shepherds crawling the hut, a traditional element in Italian contemporary Adorations of the Magi; the armies running in the far background and the quasi-anthropomorphic constructions.

== Painting materials ==
The pigments employed by the artist are consistent with his other works. He painted the triptych with ochres, lead-tin-yellow, vermilion, carmine and azurite. The sole rather unusual pigment is natural ultramarine used in small quantities in Virgin's robe.

== See also ==
- List of paintings by Hieronymus Bosch
- Adoration of the Magi (Bosch, New York)
- Adoration of the Magi (Bosch, Philadelphia)

== Sources ==
- Varallo, Franca (2004). Bosch. Milan: Skira.
- Fra Jose de Siguenza, History of the Order of ST. Jerome, 1605(Extract translation) in Bosch in Perspective, edited by James Snyder, 1973, USA
- Marianne Renson, Genealogical Information Concerning The Bronchorst Boschuysen triptych, 2001, Rotterdam
- Xavier, Duquenne, ≪ La famille Scheyfve et Jerome Bosch ≫, L’intermediaire des genealogistes, janvier-fevrier 2004, p. 1–19
- Matthijs Ilsink, Jos Koldeweij, Hieronymus Bosch: Painter and Draughtsman – Catalogue raisonné, Yale University Press, New Haven and London 2016, pp 198–215.
