= Atlanta Chamber Winds =

- Origin: Atlanta, Georgia, United States
- Genres: Chamber wind music
- Years active: 2006–present
- Label: Albany Records

Atlanta Chamber Winds is the premiere ensemble of its type in the Southeast. Founded by Robert J. Ambrose in 2006, the group includes many of the finest professional wind players in Atlanta including members of the Atlanta Opera and Ballet Orchestras. The ensemble's core instrumentation consists of pairs of flutes, oboes, clarinets, bassoons, and horns, along with trumpet and trombone. Additional musicians supplement the group as the repertoire demands. As the only chamber wind ensemble in the metropolitan area, the Atlanta Chamber Winds provides a unique voice in the cultural landscape of the city.

== Repertoire ==
In addition to performing standard works from the rich chamber wind repertory, the Atlanta Chamber Winds is committed to promoting lesser known works by established as well as emerging composers. After a highly successful public debut in 2006, the ensemble embarked on a project to create premiere recordings of rarely heard chamber wind music. the immediate result of this project is Music from Paris released on Albany Records in 2009. The ensemble took a hiatus from performing during the 2010–2011 season in order to work on their next recording project. The resulting CD of American premiere recordings titled Wind Music released in 2011 and features the following works:

- Ezra Laderman - Octet

== Reviews ==
What the critics are saying...

"... No matter the style, though, these are Frenchmen at work, and each piece requires superb technical command, careful balance, sensitivity, energy, and humor. Fortunately, the Atlanta Chamber Winds bring all of this to table and more; each individual is an accomplished professional who shines as a brilliant soloist and yet blends seamlessly into a colorful soundscape. ... Ambrose deserves kudos for putting together a first-rate group and supervising an excellent recording debut." (American Record Guide)

"This is some of the best teamwork one will hear—every rhythm in place, every note and timbre beautifully shaped, every chord tuned and balanced to perfection." (American Record Guide)

"These performances ... are nothing less than impeccable and thoroughly idiomatic; a group of actual French musicians could not improve upon them." (Fanfare)

... all in all, this is one of the most succulent musical feasts of recent vintage. All lovers of French music and wind combinations should hurry out and take a bite. (Fanfare)
