= Norman Kay (composer) =

British composer and writer

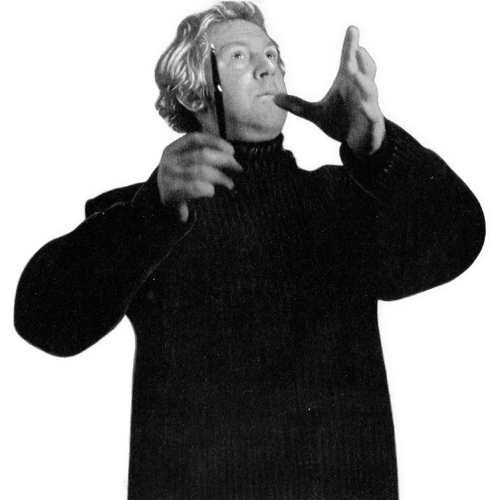

Norman Forber Kay (5 January 1929 – 12 May 2001) was a British composer and writer.

== Education and early career ==
Kay, who was born in Bolton, was educated at Bolton School, the Royal Manchester College of Music and the Royal College of Music. His teachers included Richard Hall in Manchester and Gordon Jacob in London. He began his musical career as a repetiteur at Covent Garden and Glyndebourne, where he worked with Fritz Busch, Carl Ebert and Geraint Evans.

== Television and film music ==
Kay made his living from television music. He composed the incidental music for three serials in the first season of Doctor Who, including the very first, An Unearthly Child, as well as The Keys of Marinus and The Sensorites. After leaving Doctor Who following its first season, Kay provided the incidental music for many of the Out of the Unknown stories during the rest of the 1960s, as well as composing the atmospheric theme tune of its first three seasons. Kay also provided music on productions such as Late Night Horror in 1968, the theme music for Special Branch in 1969, as well as musical direction for many other television productions, including the series Highway with Harry Secombe in the 1980s. He also scored the 1968 comedy heist film Diamonds for Breakfast.

== Concert music ==
His first concert works, including two string quartets, appeared in the 1950s. But his first big success was with the large scale (35 minutes in length) cantata King Herod, for soprano and baritone soloists, chorus and orchestra, composed for the Llandaff Festival in 1965 and published by OUP. In 1968 he composed the television opera The Rose Affair, setting a play by Alun Owen that updates the story of The Beauty and the Beast. He composed a second television opera, A Christmas Carol (after Dickens), for Harlech Television in 1978, with a libretto by John Morgan. The role of Ebenezer Scrooge was sung by Geraint Evans. A second choral orchestral cantata, Daniel, was premiered at St David's Hall, Cardiff in 1984.

Other works include the Passacaglia for Orchestra (1966), the Variations for Strings (1968) and his second Chorale Sonata for organ or strings in 1995. His last composition was Mr Pitfield's Pavane (2000), an elegy for recorder and strings remembering Thomas Pitfield, a fellow Bolton composer whom Kay met at the Royal Manchester College of Music. It has been recorded by John Turner and the Royal Ballet Sinfonia.

== Other activities ==
Kay also worked as a music critic for The Daily Telegraph. In 1971 he was the first British musician to write a study on Dmitri Shostakovich, a work that was well received. He was a member of the Savile Club from 1971, where he met his librettist John Morgan.

In 1951 Kay married Mary Fieldhouse (who from 1967 was stage manager for and partner of Tommy Cooper) and the couple had three sons, Anthony Kay, Peter Kay and Simon Kay. He never divorced Mary Fieldhouse, but later had a daughter Serena with partner Janice Willett, a former producer with ABC Television he met while at ABC subsidiary Iris Productions. Kay died in 2001 of motor neuron disease, aged 72.

== Selected works ==
- Miniature Quartet for woodwind (1950)
- String Quartets No 1 and 2 (1950s)
- King Herod (1964), cantata, Llandaff Festival
- Passacaglia for Orchestra (1966), Cheltenham Festival
- Variations On A Theme Of Michael Praetorius (1966), harpsichord
- Song Without Words (1967), incidental music (Italia prize)
- The Rose Affair (1968), television opera
- Variations for Strings (1968), Harrogate Festival
- A Christmas Carol (1978), television opera (Salzburg Opera Prize, 1980)
- Daniel (1984), cantata, St David's Hall, Cardiff
- Robin Hood (1985), opera for young people, Buxton
- Chorale Sonata No 2 for organ or strings (1995), Solihull Festival
- Mr Pitfield's Pavane (2000), elegy for recorder and strings
