= Chet Allen =

American actor (1939–1984)

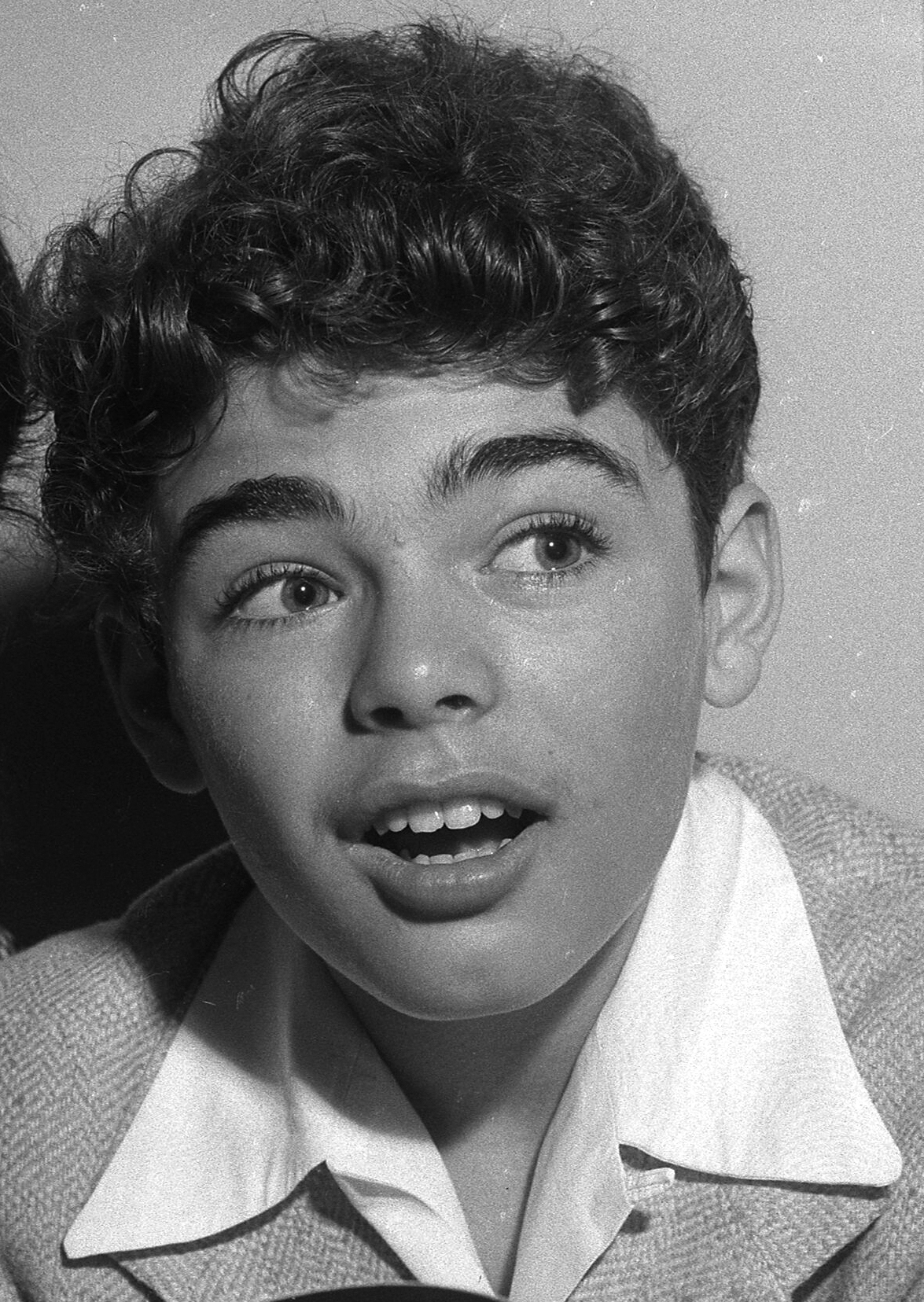
- Allen in 1952
- Born: May 6, 1939; Chillicothe, Ohio, U.S.
- Died: June 17, 1984 (aged 45); Columbus, Ohio, U.S.
- Occupation: Actor
- Years active: 1952–1958

Chet R. Allen (May 6, 1939 – June 17, 1984) was an American child actor known for his role as Amahl in Gian Carlo Menotti's Amahl and the Night Visitors, the first opera written for television, which he made with the NBC Opera Theatre.

== Early life and career ==
Allen was born in Chillicothe, Ohio, and later moved to Columbus, Ohio. At the time he was selected as Amahl, Allen was a soprano in the Columbus Boychoir, founded in Columbus. He reprised the role of Amahl in April 1952 with the New York City Opera, conducted by Thomas Schippers.

In 1952 he signed a two-year contract with Universal-International Pictures and his first film was starring with Dan Dailey in the film Meet Me at the Fair (1953) in the role of 14-year-old Tad Bayliss. That same year, he played the young teenager Jerry Bonino in the short-lived NBC series Bonino, starring Ezio Pinza as a recently widowed Italian-American opera singer Babbo Bonino, undertaking the rearing of his eight children. Mary Wickes co-starred as Martha the housekeeper.

== Death ==
In 1984, at the age of forty-five, Allen died by suicide by taking five times the fatal dosage of an anti-depressant.
