= Richard Cross (bass-baritone) =

American bass-baritone

Richard Cross (born December 7, 1935, Faribault, Minnesota) is an American bass-baritone who had an active international opera career from the late 1950s through the 1990s. Possessing a rich and warm voice, Cross sang a broad repertoire that encompassed works from a wide variety of musical periods and styles. He currently teaches on the voice faculties of the Yale School of Music, the Juilliard School, and the State University of New York at Stony Brook.

== Biography ==
Cross studied singing at Cornell College in Mount Vernon, Iowa, graduating with a bachelor's degree in 1957. He made his professional opera debut in 1958 at the first Festival dei Due Mondi in Spoleto, Italy, in the world premiere of Lee Hoiby's The Scarf. Impressed by his performance, composer Gian Carlo Menotti, who ran the Spoleto festival, invited Cross to portray the role of Donato in his new opera Maria Golovin. Cross agreed, and portrayed the role both in its premiere at the Brussels World's Fair in August 1958 and when it premiered in the United States on Broadway in November 1958 at the Martin Beck Theatre under the umbrella of the NBC Opera Theatre. For his portrayal, Cross won a Theatre World Award. In 1959 he sang the role of Donato again with the New York City Opera and toured North America with NBC Opera Theatre.

Between 1960 and 1965 Cross sang with numerous opera companies throughout the United States, including the Baltimore Opera Company and the Houston Grand Opera among others. On November 24, 1961, he made his debut with the Philadelphia Lyric Opera Company portraying Heinrich der Vogler in Richard Wagner's Lohengrin with Richard Cassilly in the title role and Eleanor Steber as Elsa at the Academy of Music. He returned to Philadelphia several more times to sing Sparafucile in Rigoletto (1962), Hunding in Die Walküre (1963, 1965), Méphistophélès in Faust (1965), and Raimondo in Lucia di Lammermoor (1965). In 1963 he made his San Francisco Opera debut portraying Count Rodolfo in Vincenzo Bellini's La Sonnambula with Joan Sutherland as Amina. That same year he recorded the role of King Melchior in Amahl and the Night Visitors both for television and in the recording studio for album release with the NBC Opera Theatre. In 1964 he performed and recorded the role of Oroveso in Bellini's Norma with Joan Sutherland in the title role, Marilyn Horne as Adalgisa, John Alexander as Pollione, conductor Richard Bonynge, and the London Symphony Orchestra. In 1965 he portrayed Father Barré in the American premiere of Krzysztof Penderecki's The Devils of Loudun at the Santa Fe Opera. In 1966 he joined the roster at the Opern- und Schauspielhaus Frankfurt in Germany where he sang roles regularly through 1979.

While singing regularly with the Frankfurt Opera, Cross maintained an active international schedule, performing at such houses at the Deutsche Oper Berlin, Theater Dortmund, the Staatstheater Stuttgart, the Hamburg State Opera, the Teatro Comunale Giuseppe Verdi, the Hungarian State Opera House, the Oper der Stadt Köln, the Teatro Real, the Washington National Opera, and Vancouver Opera among others. In 1970–1971 he appeared as a guest at the Palacio de Bellas Artes in Mexico City and in 1971 he returned to the Spoleto Festival to portray the title role in Modest Mussorgsky's Boris Godunov. He sang at Spoleto again in 1974 as Doktor Schoen in Alban Berg's Lulu. He made his first appearance at the Glyndebourne Festival in 1976 singing the title role in Giuseppe Verdi's Falstaff, returning there the following year to portray Sir Morosus in Richard Strauss's Die schweigsame Frau.

In 1979 Cross left the Frankfurt Opera to join the roster at the New York City Opera where he sang regularly through 1984 in such roles as Caspar in Der Freischütz, Sarastro in The Magic Flute, and Forester in The Cunning Little Vixen among others. He notably performed in two world premieres at the NYCO, the role of Jaggers in Dominick Argenta's Miss Havishams Fire in 1979 and the role of Dr. Hoffman in Stanley Silverman's Madame Adare. During these years he also occasionally appeared with other companies throughout the United States. In 1982 he sang in the world premiere of Robert Ward's Minute Till Midnight with the Miami Opera.

In 1984 he portrayed Barbarossa in Verdi's La battaglia di Legnano with the Pittsburgh Opera and in 1987 he sang Wotan in Siegfried at the Art Park in Lewiston, New York. In 1990 Cross returned to the NYCO to portray Moses in the 1990 production of Arnold Schoenberg's Moses und Aron.

In addition to his work in operas, Cross has worked as a recitalist and a concert soloist, notably appearing in concerts with several major symphony orchestras, including the Philadelphia Orchestra, the San Francisco Symphony, the Seattle Symphony, and the Pittsburgh Symphony Orchestra among others.
