= Amahl and the Night Visitors =

Opera by Gian Carlo Menotti

- Television opera by Gian Carlo Menotti
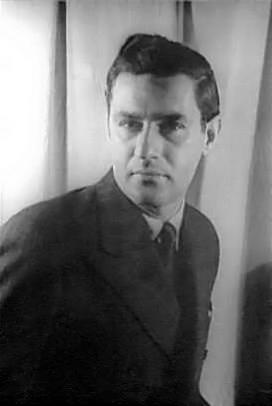
- Menotti in 1944
- Librettist: Menotti
- Language: English
- Based on: Hieronymus Bosch's The Adoration of the Magi
- Premiere: December 24, 1951; Studio 8H, New York

External videos
- Televised premiere
- Amahl and the Night Visitors (December 24, 1951) via Internet Archive

Amahl and the Night Visitors is an opera in one act by Gian Carlo Menotti with an original English libretto by the composer. It was commissioned by NBC and first performed by the NBC Opera Theatre on December 24, 1951, in New York City at NBC Studio 8H in Rockefeller Center, where it was broadcast live on television from that venue as the debut production of the Hallmark Hall of Fame. It was the first opera specifically composed for television in the United States.

== Composition history ==
Menotti was commissioned by Peter Herman Adler, director of NBC's new opera programming, to write the first opera for television. The composer had trouble settling on a subject for the opera, but took his inspiration from Hieronymus Bosch's The Adoration of the Magi hanging in the Metropolitan Museum of Art in New York City.

As the airdate neared, Menotti had yet to finish the score. The singers had little time to rehearse, and received the final passages of the score just days before the broadcast. The composer's partner Samuel Barber was brought in to complete the orchestrations. After the dress rehearsal, NBC Symphony conductor Arturo Toscanini told Menotti, "This is the best you've ever done."

Menotti distinctly wanted Amahl to be performed by a boy. In the "Production Notes" contained in the piano-vocal score he wrote: "It is the express wish of the composer that the role of Amahl should always be performed by a boy. Neither the musical nor the dramatic concept of the opera permits the substitution of a woman costumed as a child."

== Genesis ==
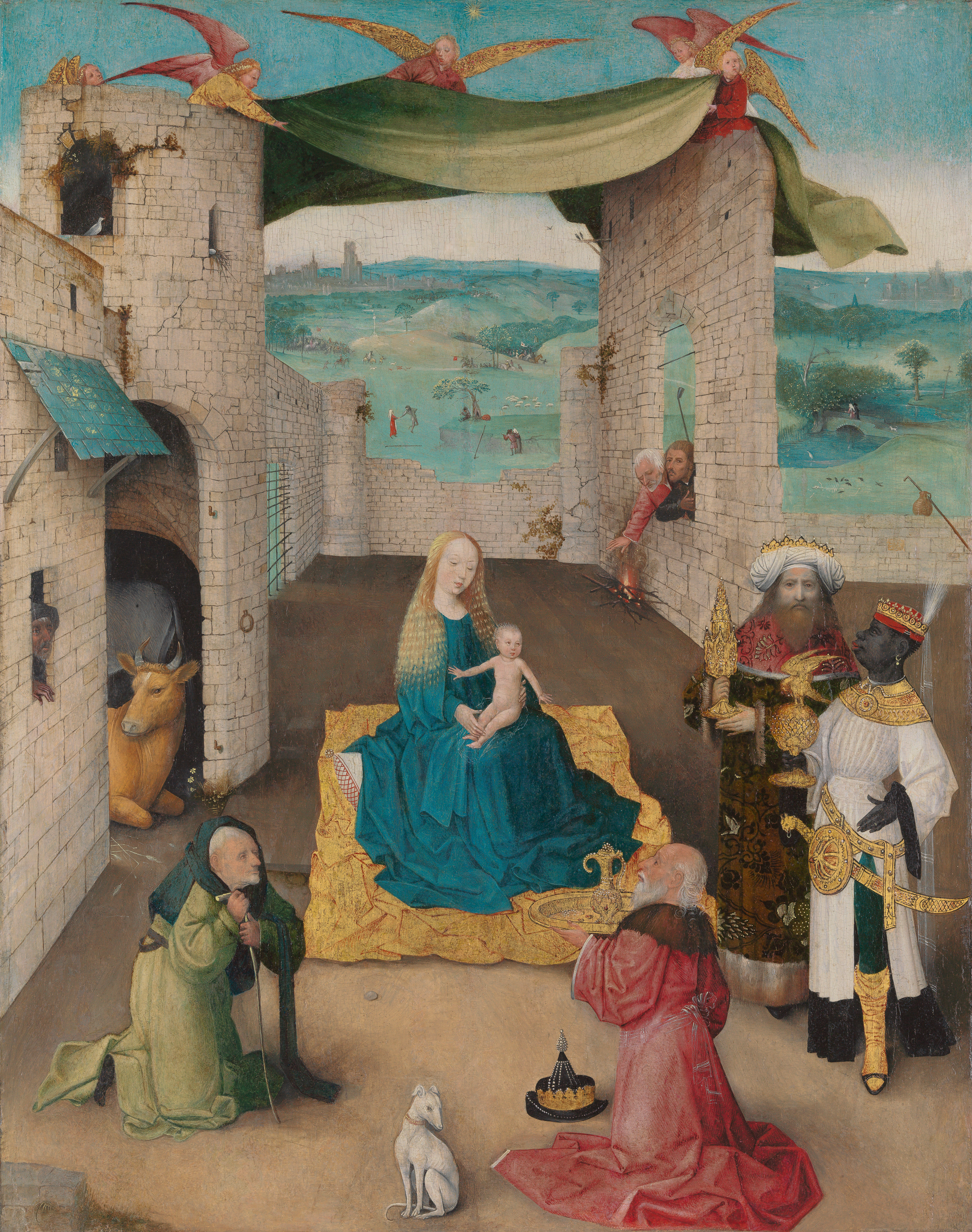
Menotti was inspired by the painting The Adoration of the Magi by Hieronymus Bosch.

The booklet with the original cast recording contains the following anecdote:

This is an opera for children because it tries to recapture my own childhood. You see, when I was a child I lived in Italy, and in Italy we have no Santa Claus. I suppose that Santa Claus is much too busy with American children to be able to handle Italian children as well. Our gifts were brought to us by the Three Kings, instead.

I actually never met the Three Kings—it didn't matter how hard my little brother and I tried to keep awake at night to catch a glimpse of the Three Royal Visitors, we would always fall asleep just before they arrived. But I do remember hearing them. I remember the weird cadence of their song in the dark distance; I remember the brittle sound of the camel's hooves crushing the frozen snow; and I remember the mysterious tinkling of their silver bridles.

My favorite king was King Melchior, because he was the oldest and had a long white beard. My brother's favorite was King Kaspar. He insisted that this king was a little crazy and quite deaf. I don't know why he was so positive about his being deaf. I suspect it was because dear King Kaspar never brought him all the gifts he requested. He was also rather puzzled by the fact that King Kaspar carried the myrrh, which appeared to him as a rather eccentric gift, for he never quite understood what the word meant.

To these Three Kings I mainly owe the happy Christmas seasons of my childhood and I should have remained very grateful to them. Instead, I came to America and soon forgot all about them, for here at Christmas time one sees so many Santa Clauses scattered all over town. Then there is the big Christmas tree in Rockefeller Plaza, the elaborate toy windows on Fifth Avenue, the one-hundred-voice choir in Grand Central Station, the innumerable Christmas carols on radio and television—and all these things made me forget the three dear old Kings of my old childhood.

But in 1951 I found myself in serious difficulty. I had been commissioned by the National Broadcasting Company to write an opera for television, with Christmas as deadline, and I simply didn't have one idea in my head. One November afternoon as I was walking rather gloomily through the rooms of the Metropolitan Museum, I chanced to stop in front of the Adoration of the Kings by Hieronymus Bosch, and as I was looking at it, suddenly I heard again, coming from the distant blue hills, the weird song of the Three Kings. I then realized they had come back to me and had brought me a gift.

I am often asked how I went about writing an opera for television, and what are the specific problems that I had to face in planning a work for such a medium. I must confess that in writing Amahl and the Night Visitors, I hardly thought of television at all. As a matter of fact, all my operas are originally conceived for an ideal stage which has no equivalent in reality, and I believe that such is the case with most dramatic authors. —Gian-Carlo Menotti

== Premiere ==
Menotti wrote Amahl with the stage in mind, even though it was intended for broadcast. "On television you're lucky if they ever repeat anything. Writing an opera is a big effort and to give it away for one performance is stupid." The composer appeared on-screen in the premiere to introduce the opera and give the background of the events leading up to its composition. He also brought out director Kirk Browning and conductor Thomas Schippers to thank them on-screen.

Amahl was seen on 35 NBC affiliates coast to coast, the largest network hookup for an opera broadcast to that date. An estimated five million people saw the live broadcast, the largest audience ever to see a televised opera.

== Performance history ==
=== 1951–1962 ===
For its first three telecasts, the program had been presented in black-and-white (there were two presentations of it in 1952, one on Easter and one during the Christmas season), but beginning in 1953, it was telecast in color. Because it was an opera, and commercial network television executives had increasingly little confidence in presenting opera on television, it later began to be scheduled, with rare exceptions, as an afternoon television program, rather than shown in prime time as had been done in its first few telecasts. According to The New Kobbé's Complete Opera Book, the first stage performance was presented at Indiana University Bloomington, on February 21, 1952, with conductor Ernest Hoffman. The opera's second performance was in Boston on December 18 and 19, 1952. It was presented by the Opera Club at the Agassiz Theatre of Radcliffe College, under the direction of Thomas H. Phillips for the Longy School of Music. James Hercules Sutton, 9, soloist for Alfred Nash Patterson at the Church of the Advent, played Amahl; Claire Smith played the mother; Walter Lambert, Paul Johnson and Hermann Gantt played the three kings.

=== 1963–1966 ===
Willis Patterson, John McCollum, Richard Cross as the Three Kings, with Kurt Yaghjian as Amahl and Martha King as his mother in the 1963 production

For years, Amahl and the Night Visitors was presented live, but in 1963 it was videotaped by NBC with conductor Herbert Grossman and an all-new cast featuring Kurt Yaghjian as Amahl, Martha King as the Mother, and John McCollum, Willis Patterson, and Richard Cross as the Three Kings. This was the first television production of Amahl in which it could be said of the cast, as Amahl says of the characters, "The kings are three, and one of them is black!" (Patterson). Earlier productions, including the 1951 original version, had had a white man in blackface playing Balthazar.

When Menotti found out that NBC had scheduled the taping on a date when he was out of the country, he tried to get the date changed. The network refused and recorded the 1963 performance without the composer's presence or participation, telecasting it in December 1963, and twice more after that – in 1964 and 1965. Menotti never approved of the 1963 production, and in May 1966 when the rights to future broadcasts reverted to him, the composer refused to allow it to be shown again. Because of this, Amahl was not shown on television at all between 1966 and 1978.

=== 1978 ===
In 1978, a new production starring Teresa Stratas as Amahl's mother, Robert Sapolsky as Amahl, and Willard White, Giorgio Tozzi and Nico Castel as the Three Kings was filmed by NBC, partly on location in the Holy Land. As was the norm for filmed opera, the music was pre-recorded and the singers mimed their performances to the playback. It did not, however, become an annual tradition the way the 1951 and 1963 versions had.

=== BBC productions ===
The BBC made several productions of Amahl and the Night Visitors in the 1950s. The first performance was broadcast on December 20, 1953, with Charles Vignoles as Amahl, and Gladys Whitred as his mother. The Three Kings were sung by John Lewis (Kaspar), Scott Joynt (Balthasar), and John Cameron (Melchior). Edric Connor was the Page and Josephine Gordon was the dancer. The opera was produced by Christian Simpson and the conductor was Stanford Robinson. This performance was so successful that it was repeated on Christmas Eve 1954 with substantially the same cast apart from the Page sung by John Carvalho and the dancer, Betty Ferrier. Both performances were broadcast live. A telerecording of the 1954 performance was broadcast on Christmas Eve 1956 but this recording seems to have been discarded. An audio recording of the 1954 performance exists in private hands.

Further performances followed. The 1955 performance was also produced by Christian Simpson, starring Malcolm Day as Amahl, with Gladys Whitred as Amahl's mother. Music was provided by the Sinfonia of London. It appears that this performance was also broadcast live. It was either not recorded or the recording was discarded. It does not exist in the BBC Archives. The second production was broadcast on December 24, 1959. This version exists as a 35 mm telerecording in the BBC Archives. This version was again produced by Christian Simpson and starred Christopher Nicholls as Amahl and Elsie Morison as Amahl's mother. This time music was provided by the Royal Philharmonic Orchestra.

=== 1957 Australian TV version ===
A version was broadcast on ABC on Australian television in 1957. It was aired live in Melbourne on 18 December 1957, and was kinescoped to be shown in Sydney on Christmas Day. It is not known if the kinescope recording still exists.

== Roles ==
Cast, voice types, premiere cast
Role	Voice type	Premiere cast, December 24, 1951 Conductor: Thomas Schippers
Amahl	boy soprano	Chet Allen
The Mother	soprano or mezzo-soprano	Rosemary Kuhlmann
King Kaspar	tenor	Andrew McKinley
King Melchior	baritone	David Aiken
King Balthazar	bass	Leon Lishner
The Page	bass	Francis Monachino
Dancing Shepherds		Melissa Hayden; Glen Tetley; Nicholas Magallanes
Shepherds and Villagers

== Synopsis ==
Place: Near Bethlehem. Time: The first century, just after the birth of Christ

Amahl, a disabled boy who can walk only with a crutch, has a problem with telling tall tales. He is sitting outside playing his shepherd's pipe when his mother calls for him ("Amahl! Amahl!"). After much persuasion, he enters the house but his mother does not believe him when he tells her there is an amazing star "as big as a window" outside over their roof ("O Mother You Should Go Out and See"; "Stop Bothering Me!").

Worn out and despairing, Amahl's mother weeps, praying that Amahl not become a beggar ("Don't Cry Mother Dear"). As they get ready to sleep, strange music is heard in the distance ("From Far Away We Come"). There is a knock at the door and the mother tells Amahl to go see who it is ("Amahl ... Yes Mother!"). He opens the door a crack and thinks he sees three splendidly dressed kings (the Magi). He duly reports this to his mother, but of course she thinks it is just another story. Finally she goes to the door to see for herself. She is stunned, but welcomes The Three Kings in. ("Good Evening!"; "Come In!") They explain that they are on a long journey to give gifts to a wondrous Child, and ask if they can rest a while in their hut. The mother agrees, apologizing that all she can offer is "a cold fireplace and a bed of straw". She goes to fetch some firewood, and Amahl seizes the opportunity to speak with the kings.

Balthazar answers Amahl's questions about his life as a king and asks what Amahl does. Amahl responds that he was once a shepherd, but his mother had to sell his sheep. Now, he says, the two of them will have to go begging. Amahl then talks with King Kaspar, who is childlike, eccentric, and a bit deaf ("Are You a Real King?"). Kaspar shows Amahl his box of magic stones, beads, and liquorice, and offers Amahl some of the candy ("This is My Box"). The mother returns ("Amahl, I Told You Not to Be a Nuisance!"). He defends himself, saying "They kept asking me questions," when of course it has in fact been Amahl asking the questions. Amahl's mother tells him to go and summon all the neighbors. As she makes up the fire she learns more about the intended recipient of the rich gifts the kings are carrying with them ("All These Beautiful Things"; "Have You Seen a Child?"). The shepherds are heard calling to one another as they gather and approach the hut ("Shepherds! Shepherdess!"; "Emily, Emily"). After some initial sheepishness, they offer hospitality to the strangers, and see that they are properly fed and entertained ("Olives and Quinces"; "Shepherds' Dance").

After the neighbors have left and the kings are resting, the mother screws up her courage and attempts to steal some of the kings' gold for her son ("All That Gold"). She is thwarted by the page ("Thief! Thief!"), and Amahl, who wakes to find the page restraining his mother, feebly but bravely attacks him ("Don't You Dare!"). Moved by Amahl's defence of his mother, and understanding the motives for the attempted theft, King Melchior tells her she may keep the gold, since the Holy Child will not need earthly power or wealth to build his kingdom ("Oh, Woman, You May Keep The Gold"). Inspired by the thought that this holy child might really be the kind of king for whom she has waited all her life, she offers back the gold and even wishes she could send a gift of her own.

Amahl decides he has something he can give: his crutch ("Oh, No, Wait"). When he offers it to the kings, everyone holds their breath. Then the realization dawns that the boy is standing and walking without his crutch: his leg has been miraculously healed ("I Walk, Mother"). Everyone rejoices, and Amahl, capering about, decides he must go and thank the Holy Child himself. The kings readily agree and promise to "bring him back on a camel's back." With his mother's reluctant consent, and after tender goodbyes, Amahl takes his place in the royal procession as the shepherds are heard greeting the breaking dawn.

== Recordings ==
For several years it was assumed that the film (kinescope) of the original telecast had been lost, but a copy was found, transferred to video, and is now available at the Paley Center for Media (formerly the Museum of Television & Radio) and online at the Museum of Broadcast Communications.

The original 1951 telecast has never been rebroadcast, although bootleg recordings have been made. A kinescope of the 1955 broadcast starring Bill McIver as Amahl was digitized in 2007 and is available commercially on DVD. The 1955 and 1978 productions are the only ones released on video. Cast recordings of both the 1951 and the 1963 productions were released on LP by RCA Victor, and the 1951 cast recording was reissued on compact disc in 1987. The 1963 recording of Amahl was the first recording of the opera made in stereo.

== Legacy ==
Amahl and the Night Visitors was the first network television Christmas special to become an annual tradition. There had already been several television productions of Charles Dickens' A Christmas Carol since about 1947, but they had not been shown annually or presented by the same television network, with the same general technical staff, as Amahl was. Until 1963, Amahl was nearly always presented with many of the same singers and production staff. From 1951 until 1966 it was presented every year on NBC (which commissioned Menotti to write it) on or around Christmas Eve, as an episode of an existing anthology series, such as The Alcoa Hour, NBC Television Opera, or the Hallmark Hall of Fame. The 1978 production of Amahl also premiered on NBC, before it went to cable television in the early 1980s.

A film of the opera, also titled Amahl and the Night Visitors, was made in Britain in 1996 by Christine Edzard.

== See also ==
- List of Christmas operas
