= Martin's Lie =

Opera by Gian Carlo Menotti

- Chamber opera for television by Gian Carlo Menotti
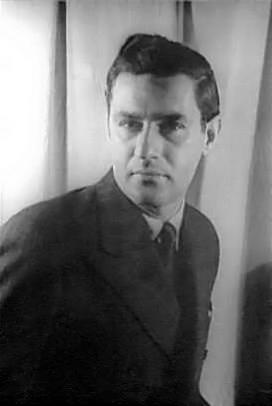
- The composer in 1944
- Librettist: Menotti
- Language: English
- Premiere: 3 June 1964; Bristol Cathedral

Martin's Lie is a chamber opera in one act with music and an English language libretto by Gian Carlo Menotti. Commissioned by CBS, it was Menotti's third opera for television after Amahl and the Night Visitors and Labyrinth. Although not initially conceived as a work for the stage, the opera premiered in a live theatrical performance on 3 June 1964 at the Bristol Cathedral for the opening of the 17th annual Bath International Music Festival. The opera was subsequently filmed with the same cast for television under the direction of Kirk Browning with Julie Andrews serving as host. The production used sets and costumes by designer Anthony Powell, and was broadcast nationally by CBS for the opera's United States television premiere on 30 May 1965.

The first live performance of the opera in the United States was at the Washington National Cathedral in 1976, with Paul Callaway conducting both Martin's Lie and the world premiere of Menotti's The Egg. The cast included Gene Tucker as Father Cornelius, Simon Jackson as Martin, Richard Dirksen as the Fugitive, Dana Krueger as the Housekeeper, and Gimi Beni as the Sheriff.

== Roles ==
Role	Voice type	Premiere Cast, 3 June 1964 (Conductor: Lawrence Leonard)
Martin	boy soprano	Michael Wennink
Stranger	baritone	Donald McIntyre
Naninge, a nurse	mezzo-soprano	Noreen Berry
Father Cornelius	tenor	William McAlpine
Sheriff	bass	Otakar Kraus
Christopher	boy soprano	Keith Collins
Timothy	boy soprano	Roger Nicholas
Executioner	silent role	Hugh Smith Marriott
Soldiers	silent roles	
Orphans (boy's chorus)

== Plot ==
Setting- An orphanage in medieval Germany

Martin, a 12‐year‐old orphan boy, deeply desires to have a father. An escaping heretic enters the orphanage in order to hide from his pursuers. Martin hides him and forms an emotional attachment to the stranger. Martin is questioned and threatened by the sheriff who is pursuing the stranger, and he lies to protect him. Martin ultimately becomes so frightened by the threats that he is literally scared to death. His refusal to betray the stranger out of love and faith makes Martin "a figure of moral power, an image of redemption. Father Cornelius, the well intentioned, ineffectual shepherd of the orphans, makes the summary point—the force of love is stronger than any sin."
