= John Morgan (British journalist) =

Welsh journalist and broadcaster

John Morgan (1929–1988) was a Welsh journalist and broadcaster. Morgan worked for the BBC as a presenter on programmes such as Panorama, and wrote for the New Statesman, The Spectator and The Sunday Times, among other publications.

== Early life ==
Morgan was born in Treboeth, Swansea, grew up in Morriston and attended the University College of Swansea.

== Career ==
In 1961 he interviewed Aldous Huxley in a one-off TV film of the same name, about modern society, Christianity, his life in the US, his friend D. H. Lawrence, and giving up the search for utopia.

Morgan wrote the librettos for two television operas produced by HTV: Alun Hoddinott's The Magician (1976), and Norman Kay's A Christmas Carol (1978).

When Morgan was diagnosed with terminal cancer, he made a film for the 4 episode Channel 4 series Concerning Cancer, documenting his experience. His film titled The Enemy Within, won the 1989 Grierson Award for "Best Documentary." A collection of his articles was published posthumously in 1993.

== Works ==
- John Morgan's Wales (Christopher Davies, 1993)
