= Adoration of the Magi (Bosch, Philadelphia) =

Painting by the workshop of Hieronymus Bosch

The Adoration of the Magi
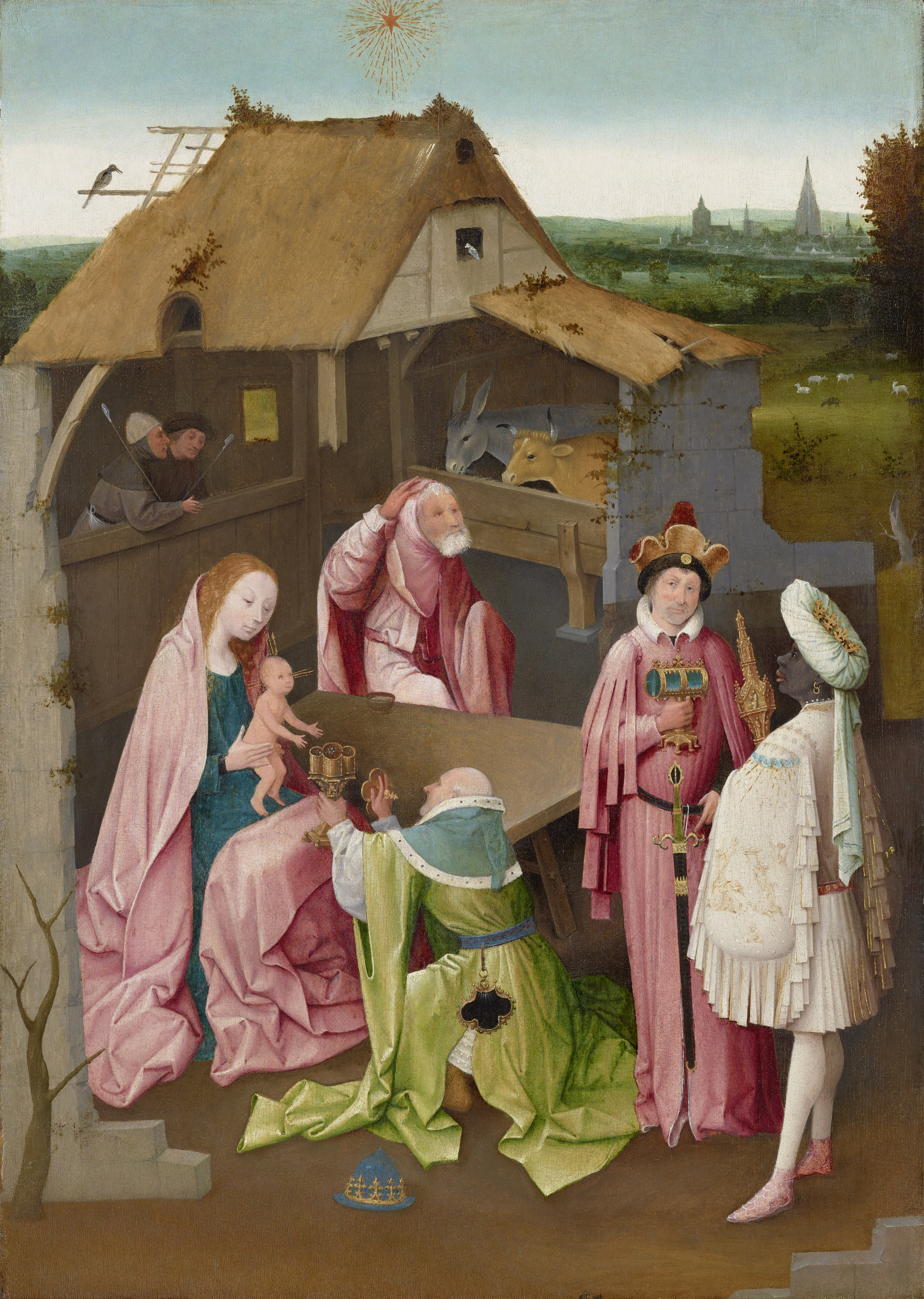
- Artist: Hieronymus Bosch
- Year: c. 1499
- Medium: oil on panel
- Dimensions: 94 cm × 74 cm (37 in × 29 in)
- Location: Philadelphia Museum of Art, Philadelphia

The Adoration of the Magi is an oil painting on wood panel attributed to the workshop of Netherlandish artist Hieronymus Bosch, executed around 1499. It is housed in the Philadelphia Museum of Art, USA. The museum's catalog assign it to around 1518, as having been finished by Bosch's workshop. According to Dendochronologic research, it could have been painted in 1493–1499.

== Description ==
The painting is a traditional representation of the Adoration of the Magi theme, similar to other Bosch Adoration of the Magi of New York, although reversed. Mary is at left, taking shelter under a small hut (which has clear perspective errors), while the three Magi bring their gifts to Jesus. As common in these pictures, Balthazar is kneeling with his crown lying on the ground, while the other two speak to each other.

The background is more original. It depicts Joseph scratching his head, with a table represented in a wide-angle perspective; behind the hut are the ox and the donkey and two men armed with arrows.

Hungarian art historian Charles de Tolnay explained the more archaic elements as a citation of a miniature of the Utrecht Missal (1425–1430), which also includes, for example, the cracked wooden pillar of the hut or the Manna fall representation in Gaspar's sleeve.
