= The Trials of Galileo =

The Trials of Galileo is an opera-oratorio, copyrighted in 1967, with libretto in English by Joe Darion and music by Ezra Laderman. Commissioned by Pamela Illott, Executive Producer of Cultural Programming of the CBS Television Network, and first performed on that network in May, 1967 under the title The Trials of Galileo. On February 3, 1979, it was modified for a staged performance under the new title, Galileo Galilei, performed by the Tri-Cities Opera in cooperation with the State University of New York at Binghamton.

== Setting ==
The play is set in and around Rome, Italy, in the 17th century.

Act I: In the study of Galileo in Arcetri;

Act II: A conference room in the Vatican, later in the quarters of Cardinal Bellarmine;

Act III: The Inquisition trial; Epilogue: Same as Act 1. Duration: approximately 2 hours.

== Synopsis ==
=== Act I ===
Galileo is seated in his study, defeated, rejected, and blind. He is old and as he awaits death he contemplates his long and turbulent life. His astronomical discoveries have consistently been rejected by tradition-bound professors as well as the church. A Roman noblewoman known as The Friend is beside Galileo, comforting and protecting him. To her, he pours out his heart. She warns him that he cannot break down the walls of ignorance of the universities. The Anonymous Beast of Rome, the mob, assault him with their blind ignorance. He cannot conceal his findings.

=== Act II ===
Pope Paul has called a meeting to consider Galileo and his discoveries. Distinguished church leaders find that Galileo’s mind and work are a dangerous threat to the church and its doctrine. Bellarmine defends Galileo, stating that scientific truth can never hurt the church. The Interrogator requests that if Galileo is given over to him, he will never again trouble the church. Bellarmine summons Galileo, informing him that the Pope must be consulted on all discoveries before they are made public. Furthermore, he must stop his ill-treatment of women. A tableau of Galileo’s ill treatment of women follow with brief scenarios of Marina, his mistress, his daughters, his tavern friends, and his faithful Friend. We are returned to his conversation with Bellarmine, in which Bellarmine warns him not to claim discoveries when he Knows they are true, especially that the earth moves. Galileo angrily cries out “The earth moves” as the curtain falls.

=== Act III ===
Barberini has become the new Pope, Urban VIII. He is angry with Galileo for not heeding the warnings of the church. He is given over to the Inquisition for trial. He is sentenced, imprisoned and finally placed under house arrest to his old home in Arcetri. In the Epilogue we are returned to Galileo’s study during his final years. He has written all his discoveries into one massive book and begs his Friend to take the book to Holland and have it printed. She finally consents. Galileo, now blind, turns his face to the heavens and declares: “Let the world know what Galileo knows! If l am to be judged, let God judge me!” The chorus thunders a triumphant Eppur se Muove (the earth moves) as the curtain falls.

== Music ==
It includes a Victorian waltz in the epilogue.

== Reception ==
Short critique: Rhythmic complexities, considerable dissonances, straying tonalities with much chromaticism. Some spoken dialogue, mostly with underscoring. Vocal lines melodic, though chromatic. The stage opera is a revision of the oratorio The Trials of Galileo (1967, New York CBS). SCORE: Oxford University Press, 1978 LIBRETTO: English Oxford University Press BIBLIOGRAPHY: Harold Schonberg, review, NYT (Feb. 5, 1979): C 13.
