= The Island God =

Opera by Gian Carlo Menotti

- Opera by Gian Carlo Menotti
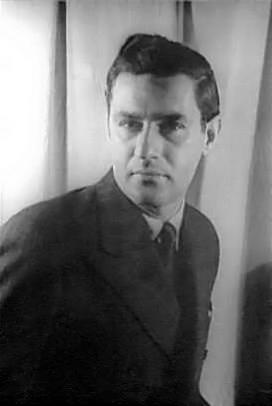
- The composer in 1944
- Librettist: Menotti
- Language: English
- Premiere: February 20, 1942; Metropolitan Opera, New York

The Island God is a one-act opera by Gian Carlo Menotti with a libretto by the composer. It was first performed on February 20, 1942, at the Metropolitan Opera in New York City.

Although the opera’s only performances were in English, Menotti wrote the libretto in Italian (as Ilo e Zeus).

== Performance history ==
The Island God received four performances at the Metropolitan Opera, appearing on double bills with Pagliacci and La bohème. Although the cast included Leonard Warren as Ilo and Astrid Varnay as Telea, the opera was not a success. Reviewing the opera in Musical America, Oscar Thompson called it “more effective as a literary conception than something of opera.” Menotti was dissatisfied with the opera's staging and began demanding greater input on productions of his works.

The Island God has not been performed since its premiere; Menotti reportedly destroyed all copies of the score. In a 1996 interview, Menotti dismissed the opera as “a big bore.” When asked about a revival, he replied, “I’ll never give you that torment.”

== Roles ==
| Role | Voice type | Premiere Cast, February 20, 1942 (Conductor: - Ettore Panizza) |
|---|---|---|
| Ilo | baritone | Leonard Warren |
| Greek God | bass | Norman Cordon |
| Telea | soprano | Astrid Varnay |
| Luca | tenor | Raoul Jobin |
| Fisherman's Voice | tenor | John Carter |

== Synopsis ==
Ilo, a fisherman, and his wife Telea arrive on a deserted island, where they discover a ruined temple. When Ilo gives thanks to the temple’s god for his safe arrival, the god comes to life and orders Ilo to rebuild the temple.

While Ilo is absorbed in his work, another fisherman, Luca, arrives on the island. He and Telea quickly fall in love and make plans to flee the island. When Ilo discovers the plan, Luca and Telea trap him in a fishing net and escape.

Believing that the god has abandoned him, Ilo destroys the temple. The god then kills Ilo, only to perish because no one is left to worship him.
