= The Unicorn, the Gorgon, and the Manticore =

1956 opera by Gian Carlo Menotti

The Unicorn, the Gorgon and the Manticore
- "Madrigal fable" by Gian Carlo Menotti
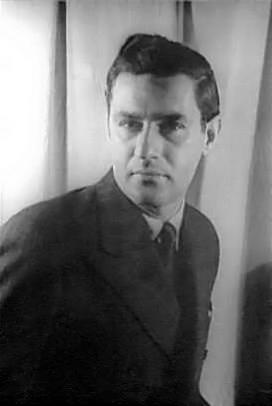
- The composer in 1944
- Language: English
- Premiere: October 19, 1956; Library of Congress, Washington D.C.

The Unicorn, the Gorgon and the Manticore or The Three Sundays of a Poet is a "madrigal fable" for chorus, ten dancers and nine instruments with music and original libretto by Gian Carlo Menotti. Based on the 16th-century Italian madrigal comedy genre, it consists of a prologue and 12 madrigals which tell a continuous story, interspersed with six instrumental interludes. The unicorn, gorgon, and manticore in the title are allegories for three stages in the life of the story's protagonist, a strange poet who keeps the mythical creatures as pets. The work premiered in Washington D.C. at the Library of Congress Coolidge Auditorium on October 19, 1956.

== Background and performance history ==
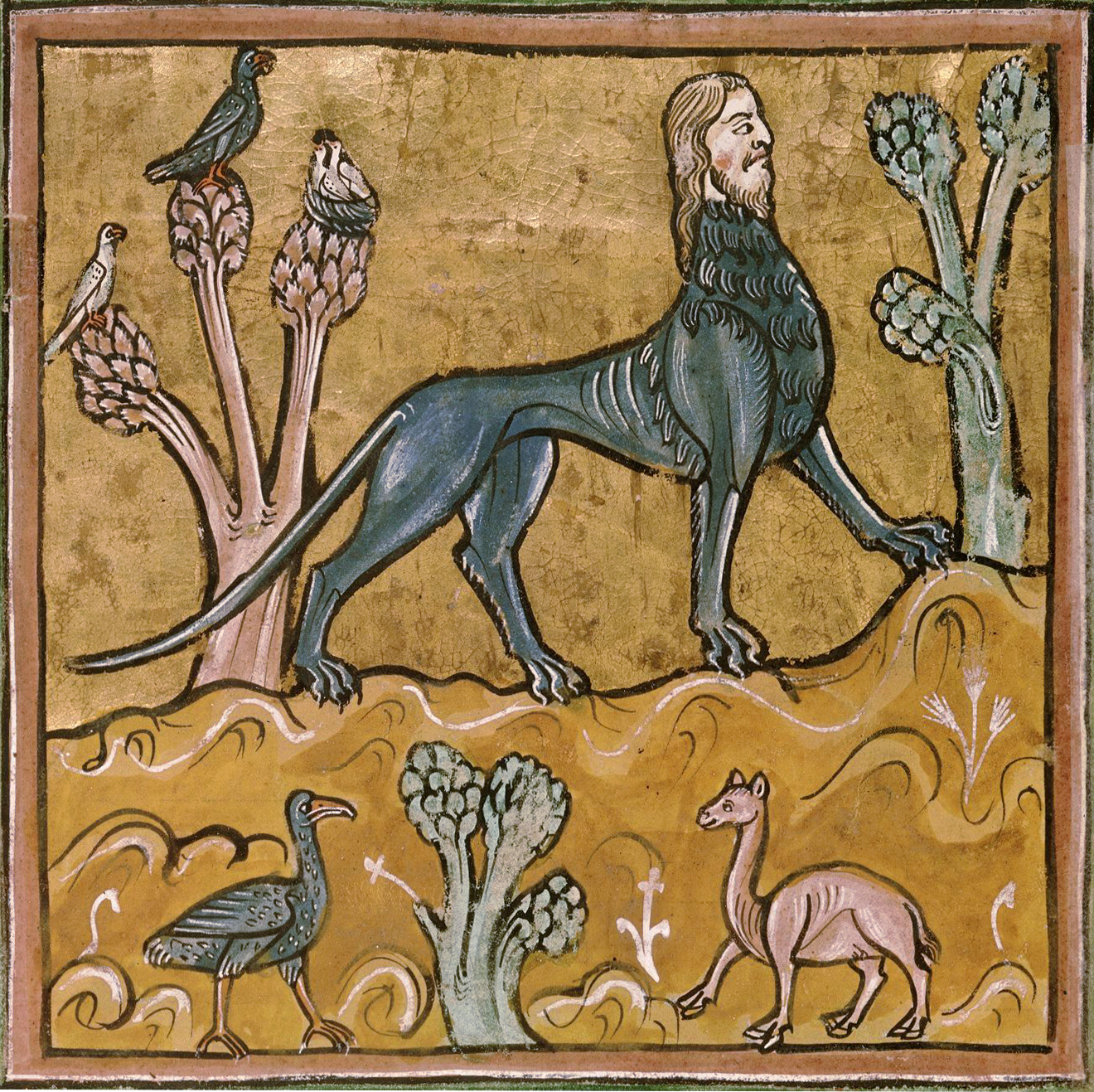
A manticore in an illustration from the Rochester Bestiary

The Unicorn, the Gorgon and the Manticore was commissioned in 1956 by the Elizabeth Sprague Coolidge Foundation for the 12th Festival of Chamber Music in Washington, D.C. In constructing the libretto Menotti returned to an earlier script he had written after reading T. H. White's 1954 The Book of Beasts, a translation of a medieval Latin bestiary. The plot is a comic but ultimately melancholy attack on the "indifferent killers of the poet's dreams": slavish social conformity and the ease with which the "unfashionable" is discarded. More than one writer, including Menotti himself, has suggested that he strongly identified with the poet in his story. The three creatures of the title are allegorical representations of stages in the poet's life, with The Unicorn representing the beauty and promise of youth, The Gorgon representing the success and haughtiness of middle age, and The Manticore representing the shy loneliness of old age. Despite its English language libretto, Menotti's work was modelled on the 16th-century Italian madrigal comedy or commedia harmonica, a precursor to the opera genre and typified by Orazio Vecchi's L'Amfiparnaso. Unlike conventional operas, all the singing is choral with no solo voice roles. Although the dancers were intended to be an integral part of the work, Menotti resisted calling it a ballet and eventually settled on the description "madrigal fable". He composed it at virtually the last minute, sending madrigals to his choreographer as he finished them. The twelfth and last one was completed a week before the premiere with the first complete rehearsal held only four days before the opening night.

The world premiere took place at the Library of Congress Coolidge Auditorium conducted by Paul Callaway (a last minute replacement for Thomas Schippers) and ran on October 19, 20 and 21, 1956 to both critical and popular success. Its New York premiere was performed by the New York City Ballet on January 15, 1957, in a production conducted by Thomas Schippers and choreographed by John Butler who also choreographed the world premiere in Washington. The role of The Poet in the New York City production was danced by Nicholas Magallanes with the three mythical creatures in the story danced by Arthur Mitchell (The Unicorn), Eugene Tanner (The Gorgon), and Richard Thomas (The Manticore). It has been revived many times over the ensuing 40 years, both in its full ballet form and (more frequently) as a choral work. It received its Boston premiere in 1972 performed by the Boston Cecilia, who revived it again in 1996 with a performance at Sanders Theatre in preparation for their studio recording released the following year. Recent performances have included those in Reno, Nevada performed by Nevada Opera and the Sierra Nevada Ballet in 2007; Spoleto, Italy at the Festival dei Due Mondi also in 2007; and Washington, D.C. performed by the Cantate Chamber Singers and the Bowen McCauley Dance Company in 2009. Menotti's centenary year, 2011, has seen performances in Seattle by The Esoterics vocal ensemble and in Ljubljana by the Slovenian National Theatre Opera and Ballet.

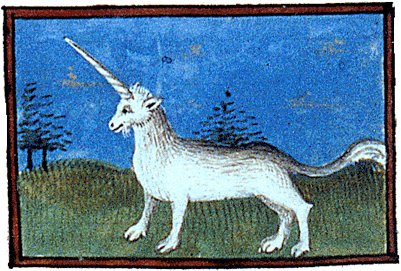
A unicorn pictured in a manuscript of De proprietatibus rerum by Bartholomeus Anglicus

== Structure and music ==
The Unicorn, the Gorgon and the Manticore consists of a prologue and 12 madrigals which tell a continuous story. They are sung (most of them a cappella) by a 24-voice SATB chorus and are interspersed with six instrumental interludes. Lasting approximately 45 minutes, the work is orchestrated for a chamber ensemble consisting of winds (flute, oboe, clarinet, bassoon, trumpet), lower strings (cello and double bass), harp, and percussion. The music was described by the Time Magazine critic who attended the world premiere as "a singular and engaging combination of ancient contrapuntal harmonies and tart, modern, dramatic values." The critic also singled out the melancholy beauty of the twelfth and last madrigal with the chorus singing "almost liturgically, as if each voice were a pipe in an organ." Menotti said of the twelfth madrigal: "It is the most deeply and personally felt of anything I've written. It is something I would like for my own funeral." The madrigal was also sung in 1981 at the funeral of Samuel Barber, who had been Menotti's lover for many years.

== Synopsis ==
The prologue describes a strange man living in a castle above a seaside town who shuns the town's social life and the Contessa's parties and refuses to go to church on Sundays. The strange man is a poet who on three successive Sundays takes a different pet on a walk through the streets of the town. On the first Sunday, he parades his unicorn. The Contessa insists she must have a unicorn as well and persuades her husband to get one for her. The citizens of the town then buy unicorns as well. On the next Sunday, the poet is seen with a gorgon. The Contessa and townspeople assume he has killed his unicorn and promptly kill theirs to replace them with gorgons. On the third Sunday, he appears with a manticore. They once again follow suit by killing their gorgons and buying manticores. When the poet fails to appear on the fourth Sunday, the townspeople assume he has killed his manticore too. Scandalized, they march to his castle to attack him. When they arrive, they find the poet dying surrounded by his three pets, all of whom are alive. In the twelfth and final madrigal he berates the townspeople for slavishly following fashion. Unlike them, he had kept all his pets: "You, not I, are the indifferent killers of the poet's dreams. How could I destroy the pain wrought children of my fancy?" The poet then bids farewell to each of his creatures in turn and tells them "Not even death I fear as in your arms I die."

== Recordings ==
An LP recording of the work conducted by Thomas Schippers was released by EMI/Angel in 1957, and re-released on CD in 2011 by Naxos Historical. More recent recordings include:

- Menotti: The Unicorn, the Gorgon and the Manticore – Boston Cecilia, Donald Teeters (conductor). Label: Newport Classic (1997)
- Menotti: The Unicorn, the Gorgon and the Manticore – Carolina Chamber Chorale, Timothy Koch (conductor). Label: Albany Records (2001)
