= Meet Me at the Fair =

1953 film by Douglas Sirk

- Directed by: Douglas Sirk
- Screenplay by: Irving Wallace; Martin Berkeley
- Based on: The Great Companions by Gene Markey
- Produced by: Albert J. Cohen
- Starring: Dan Dailey; Diana Lynn; Hugh O'Brian
- Cinematography: Maury Gertsman
- Edited by: Russell F. Schoengarth
- Music by: Joseph Gershenson
- Production company: Universal-International Pictures
- Distributed by: Universal-International Pictures
- Release date: January 1953
- Running time: 87 minutes
- Country: United States
- Language: English
- Box office: $1.3 million (US rentals)

Meet Me at the Fair is a 1953 American musical film directed by Douglas Sirk and starring Dan Dailey, Diana Lynn and Hugh O'Brian. Produced and distributed by Universal Pictures, it was shot in technicolor.

== Plot ==
A boy named Tad flees from the orphanage and is given a ride by Doc Tilbee, a man with a traveling medicine show. Meanwhile, Zerelda King is assigned to look into possible illegal and unethical activity at an orphanage, which may or may not involve her fiancé.

== Cast ==
- Dan Dailey as Doc
- Diana Lynn as Zerelda
- Hugh O'Brian as Chilton
- Carole Mathews as Clara Brink (songs dubbed by Jo Ann Greer)
- Scatman Crothers as Enoch
- Chet Allen as Tad
- Rhys Williams as Pete McCoy
- Thomas E. Jackson as Billy Gray
- Russell Simpson as Sheriff Evans
- George Chandler as Deputy Leach
- Virginia Brissac as Mrs. Spooner
- John Maxwell as Mr. Spooner
- Doris Packer as Mrs. Swaile
- Edna Holland as Miss Burghey
- George Spaulding as Governor
- Franklyn Farnum as Wall Street Tycoon
- Roger Moore as Wall Street Tycoon
- Max Wagner as Iceman

== Production ==
The film was initially called The Great Companions and was due to feature Ann Blyth and Gloria Grahame. It was 12-year old singer Chet Allen's first role after signing a two-year contract with Universal-International.

== Reviews ==
Movie critic Leonard Maltin considers this to be a "pleasant musical".
