= Adoration of the Magi (Bosch, New York) =

Painting by the circle of Hieronymus Bosch

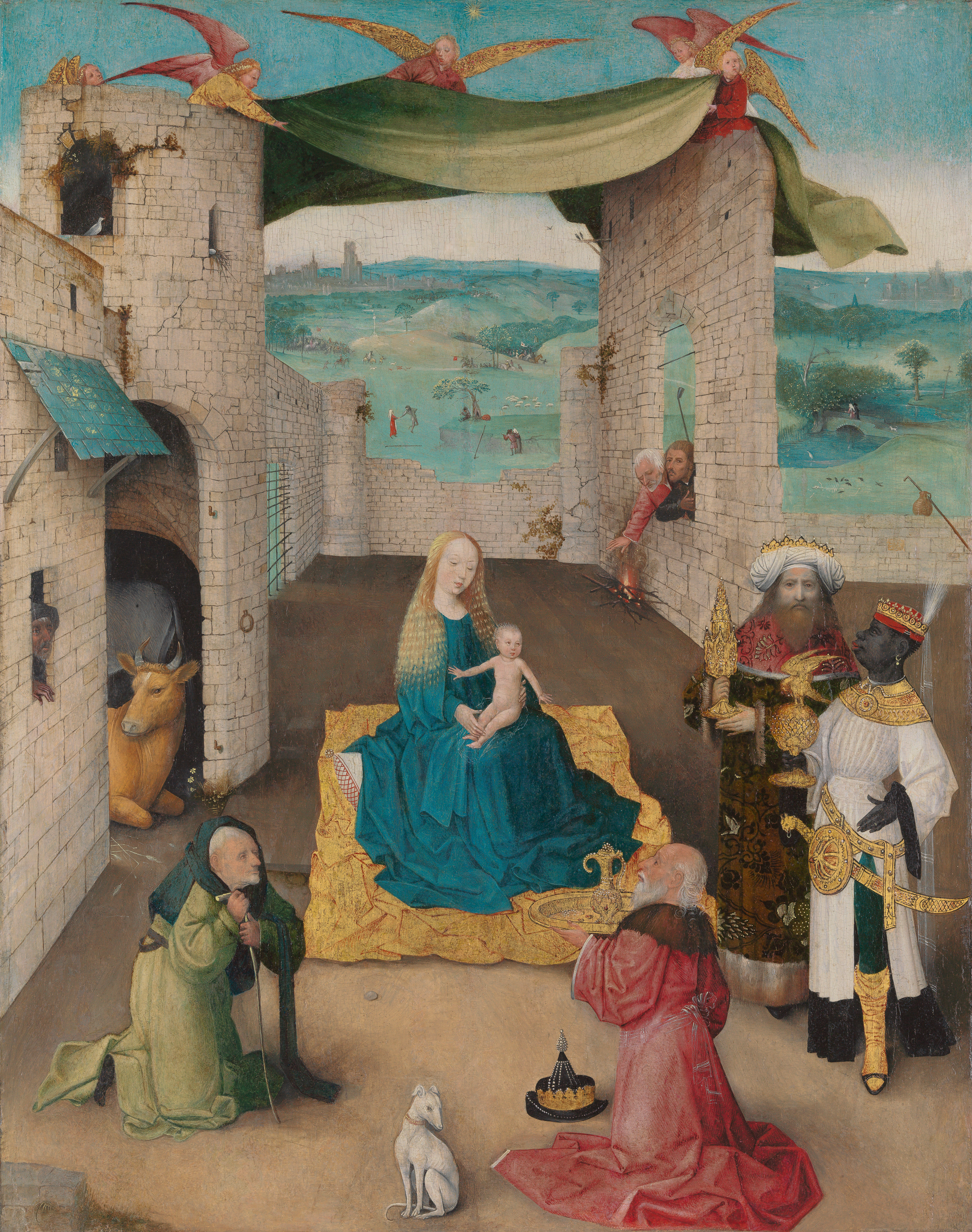
- Artist: Hieronymus Bosch
- Year: c. 1475
- Type: oil on oak
- Dimensions: 71 cm × 57 cm (28 in × 22 in)
- Location: Metropolitan Museum of Art, New York

The Adoration of the Magi is an oil painting on wood panel by Dutch artist Hieronymus Bosch, executed around 1475. It is housed in the Metropolitan Museum, New York, US. A prominent feature of this painting is the strong perspective effect and also the copious use of gold leaf, which is not very typical for Bosch. The pigments employed are red lake, azurite, lead-tin-yellow and ochres.

== Description ==
This painting describes the common subject of Adoration of the Magi, here depicted in a unique stage-like manner, perhaps influenced from religious plays in Bosch's hometown of Hertogenbosch. As was common by the late 15th century, Balthasar is differentiated from his companions, Melchior and Caspar, through his clothing and appearance as an African king. The painting focuses on the presentation of gifts to the Christ child. Melchior offers a golden flagon and basin decorated with pearls and gems. Caspar offers a ciborium holding myrrh. Finally, Balthasar offers an elaborate cup topped with a bird pecking at itself.

== Attribution ==
The precise authorship of this panel is and has been disputed. In the early 20th century, art historian Charles de Tolnay listed it as contested and insinuated it was a later copy of Bosch's work. However, in 2016, the Bosch Research and Conservation Project confirmed its attribution to Bosch based on evidence in the underdrawing. Infrared technology shows that it was completed in brush, Bosch's preferred tool. Additionally, the sketch also shows multiple revisions, suggesting it was not a copy, but an ongoing creative process.

== See also ==
- List of paintings by Hieronymus Bosch
- The Epiphany, Bosch
- Adoration of the Magi (Bosch, Philadelphia)

== Sources ==
- Varallo, Franca (2004). Bosch. Milan: Skira.
