= Art of the Low Countries =

Visual arts created in the Low Countries, as well as Belgium and the Netherlands

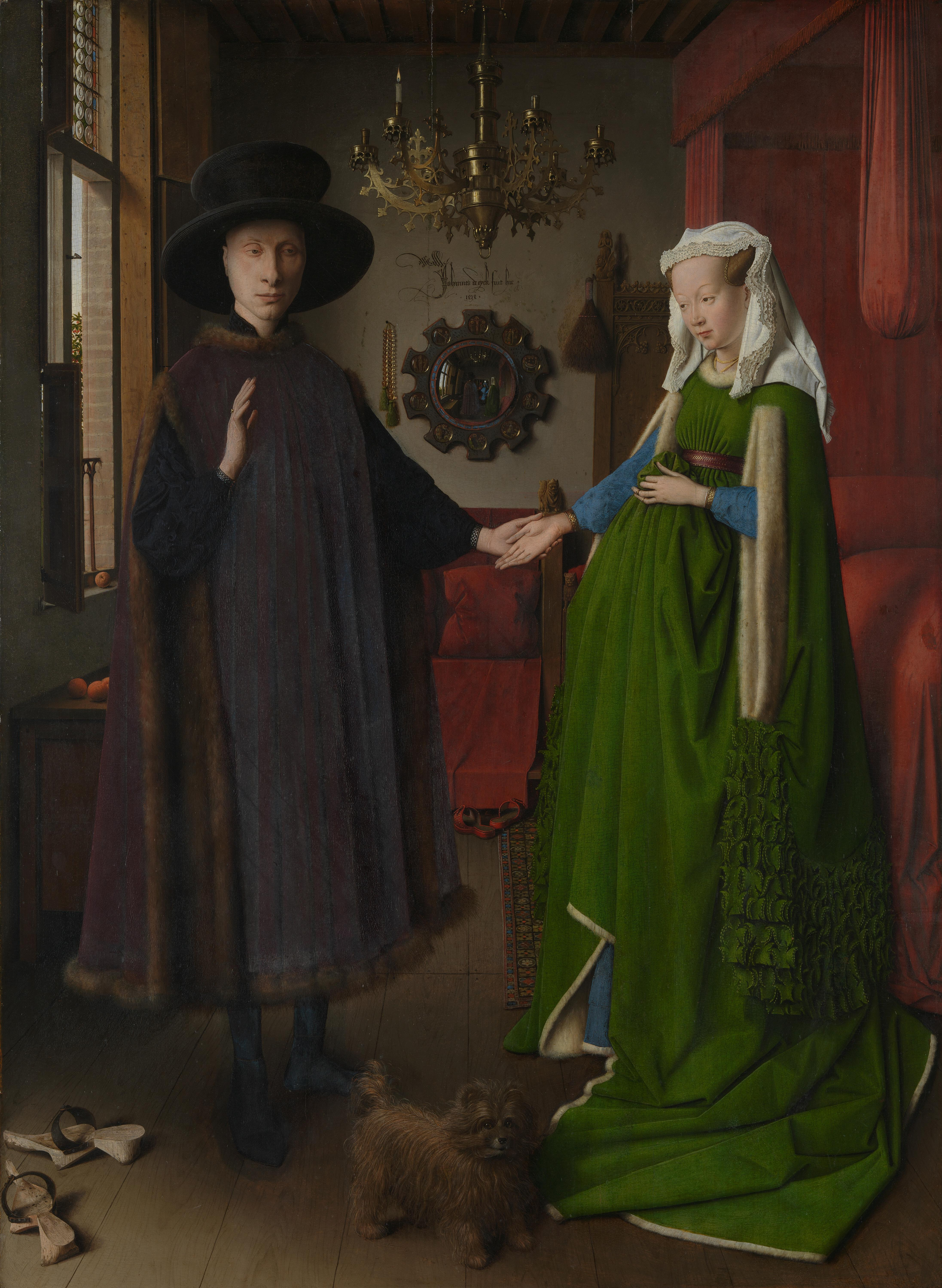
Jan van Eyck, The Arnolfini Portrait, National Gallery, London.

The art of the Low Countries consists of painting, sculpture, architecture, printmaking, pottery, and other forms of visual art produced in the Low Countries, and since the 19th century in Belgium in the southern Netherlands and the Netherlands in the north.

From the late Middle Ages until about 1700 the Low Countries were a leading force in the art of northern Europe, thereafter becoming less important. In the earlier High Middle Ages Mosan art, from an area partly in the Low Countries, had had a similar role.

The art of the Low Countries includes the traditions of Early Netherlandish painting and the Renaissance in the Low Countries, before the political separation of the region. After the separation, a protracted process lasting between 1568 and 1648, Dutch Golden Age painting in the north and Flemish Baroque painting, especially the art of Peter Paul Rubens, were the cornerstones of art.

== Early Netherlandish ==
Early Netherlandish art, traditionally called Flemish Primitives, flourished during the 15th and early 16th centuries in the Low Countries, especially in the flourishing cities of Bruges and Ghent. It begins approximately with the careers of Robert Campin and Hubert and Jan van Eyck around 1400 and ends with Gerard David about 1520. Other major figures include Rogier van der Weyden, Hugo van der Goes, and Petrus Christus.

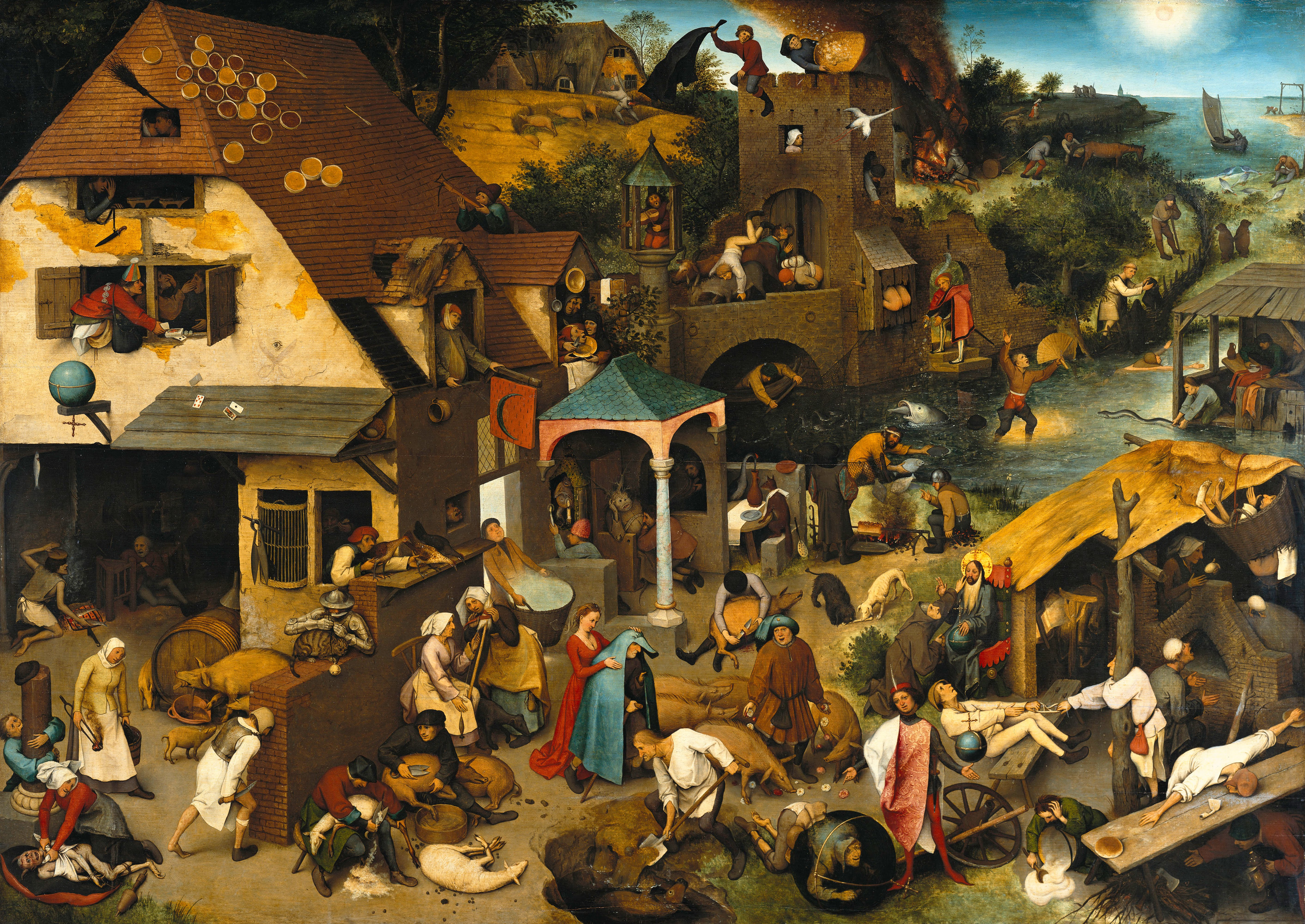
Pieter Bruegel the Elder, Netherlandish Proverbs, 1559

== Renaissance and Mannerism ==
The 16th century was a period of response to Italian Renaissance art and the development of several distinctly Netherlandish themes. At the start of the century, Hieronymus Bosch painted fantastic images, often for courtly viewers, that left a long legacy. Jan Mabuse, Maarten van Heemskerck, and Frans Floris were all instrumental in adopting Italian models and incorporating them into their artistic language. The spread of Mannerism throughout Europe produced important forms of Northern Mannerist art in the Low Countries. Finally, Joachim Patinir was a recognized innovator of landscape painting, while Pieter Bruegel the Elder and Pieter Aertsen helped establish genre painting as a popular subject matter.

== Baroque and classicism ==
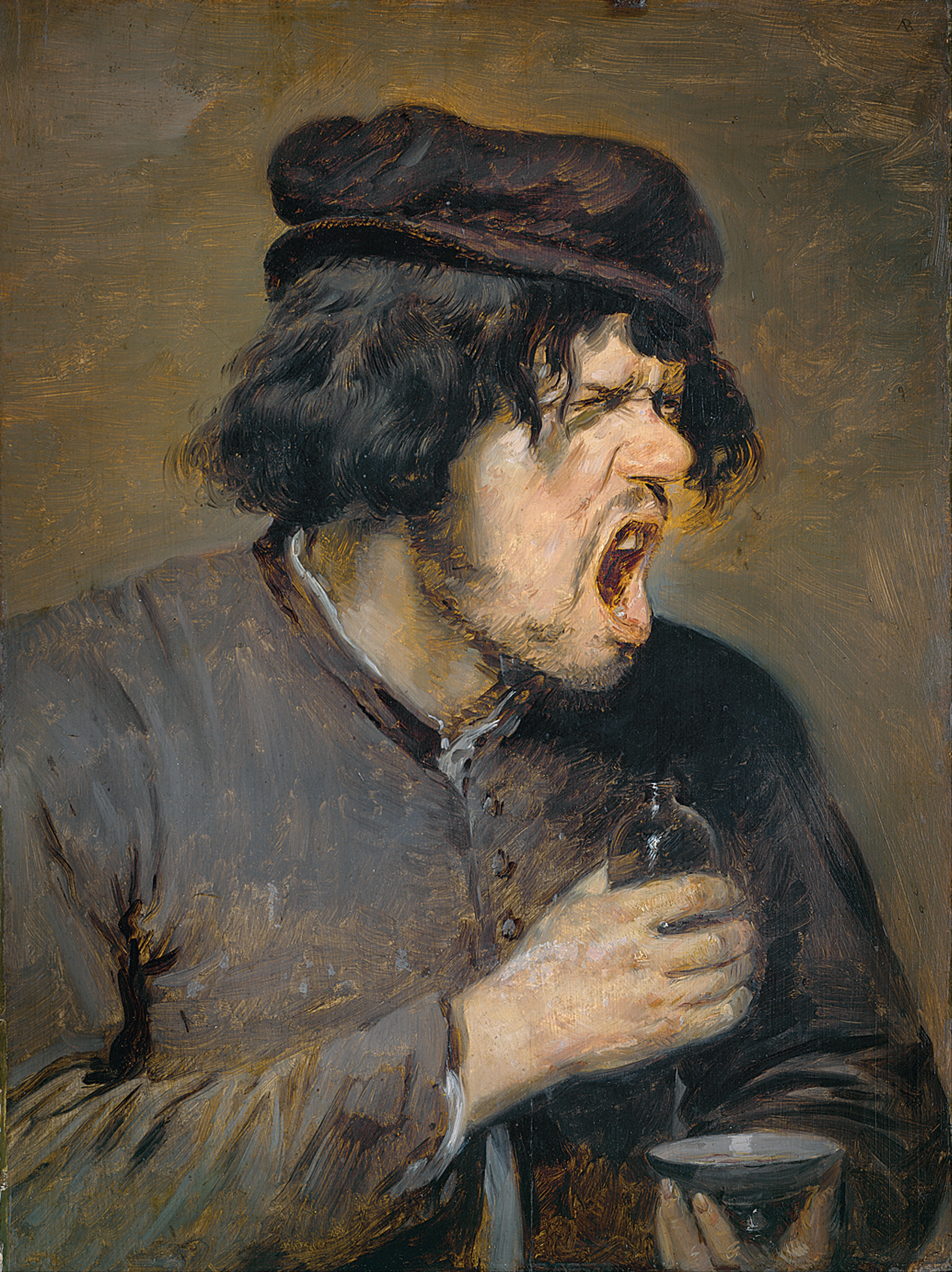
Adriaen Brouwer, The Bitter Tonic, Städelsches Kunstinstitut und Städtische Galerie, Frankfurt am Main. Oil on oak, 48 x 36 cm. Adriaen Brouwer worked in both the northern and southern Netherlands and reflects shared artistic tendencies.

The 17th century was a period dominated by the distinct individuals Peter Paul Rubens in the Southern Netherlands and Rembrandt van Rijn in the newly independent Dutch Republic. Dutch and Flemish painters both followed many of the same themes, including still life, genre, landscape, portraiture and classicism. Other artistic tendencies clearly differentiated art in the south from the north: the Counter-Reformation, which spurred on patronage for large altarpieces in the south, was absent from the Dutch Republic, while Flemish painting did not see the development of the types of calm, single-figure genre paintings championed by the likes of Jan Vermeer.

== 1700–1830 ==
The most famous painter from the region in the late 17th and early 18th century is Antoine Watteau, whose hometown of Valenciennes had been annexed by France a decade before he was born. Otherwise, few painters from about 1700 until the end of the United Kingdom of the Netherlands in 1830 have been incorporated into the art historical discourse. Dutch painters such as Jacob de Wit adopted a lofty Rococo style, indebted somewhat to Rubens, for ceiling decorations, but there was little work available. Other painters, such as Cornelis Troost, looked to England and especially the works of William Hogarth, for inspiration.

== After 1830 ==
Art after 1830 in Belgium and the Netherlands follow separate paths as the countries further develop their own identities. James Ensor is an important figure from Belgium, while Vincent van Gogh, from the Netherlands, posthumously reached the level of modern superstar painter.
