= Gian Carlo Menotti =

Italian-American composer and librettist (1911–2007)

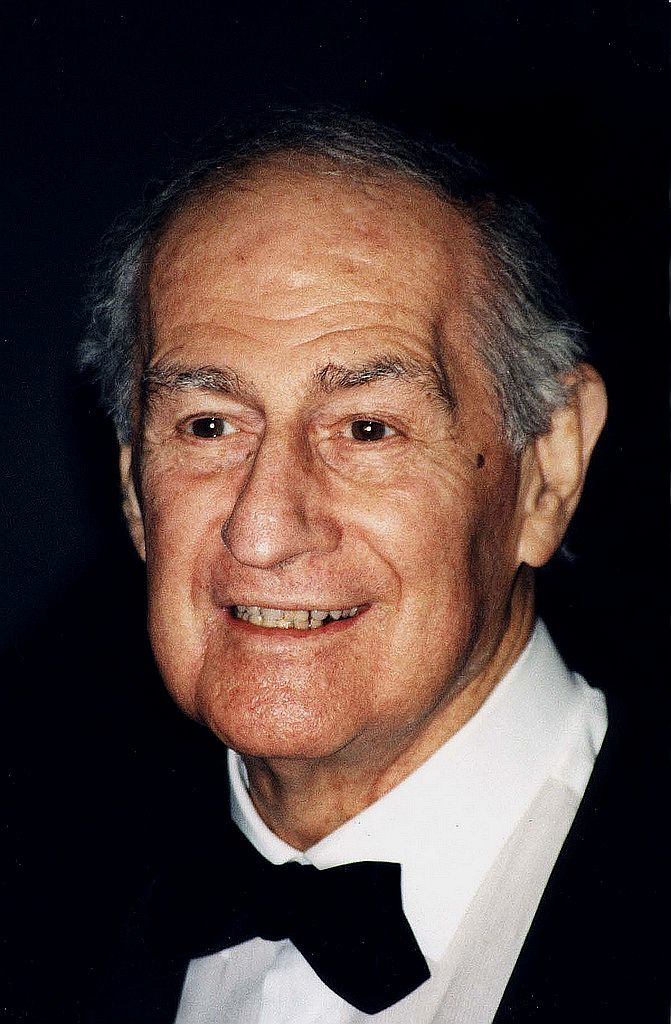
- Menotti in 2000
- Born: July 7, 1911; Cadegliano-Viconago, Lombardy, Kingdom of Italy
- Died: February 1, 2007 (aged 95); La Colle, Monaco
- Occupations: Composer; librettist; director; playwright
- Years active: 1933–1995
- Partner: Samuel Barber (1928–1970)

Gian Carlo Menotti (/məˈnɒti/ mə-NOT-ee, Italian: [dʒaŋ ˈkarlo meˈnɔtti]; July 7, 1911 – February 1, 2007) was an Italian composer, librettist, director, and playwright who is primarily known for his output of 25 operas. Although he often referred to himself as an American composer, he kept his Italian citizenship and never officially became an American citizen. One of the most frequently performed opera composers of the 20th century, he wrote his most successful works in the 1940s and 1950s. Highly influenced by Giacomo Puccini and Modest Mussorgsky, Menotti further developed the verismo tradition of opera in the post-World War II era. Rejecting atonality and the aesthetic of the Second Viennese School, Menotti's music is characterized by expressive lyricism which carefully sets language to natural rhythms in ways that highlight textual meaning and underscore dramatic intent.

Like Wagner, Menotti wrote the libretti of all his operas. He wrote the classic Christmas opera Amahl and the Night Visitors (1951), along with over two dozen other operas intended to appeal to popular taste. Many of Menotti's operas enjoyed successful runs on Broadway, including two Pulitzer Prize winning works, The Consul (1950) and The Saint of Bleecker Street (1955). While all of his works used English language libretti, three of his operas also had Italian language libretti penned by the composer: Amelia Goes to the Ball (1937), The Island God (1942), and The Last Savage (1963). He founded the Festival dei Due Mondi (Festival of the Two Worlds) in Spoleto in 1958 and its American counterpart, Spoleto Festival USA, in 1977. In 1986 he commenced a Melbourne Spoleto Festival in Australia, but he withdrew after three years.

Menotti also wrote music for several ballets, many choral works, chamber music, orchestral music of varying kinds including a symphony, and stage plays. Notable among these are his cantata The Death of the Bishop of Brindisi, written in 1963, and the cantata Landscapes and Remembrances in 1976 – a descriptive work of Menotti's memories of America written for the United States Bicentennial. Also worthy of note is a small Mass commissioned by the Roman Catholic Archdiocese of Baltimore, entitled Mass for the Contemporary English Liturgy.

Menotti taught music composition on the faculty of the Curtis Institute of Music from 1948 to 1955. He also served as the artistic director of the Teatro dell'Opera di Roma from 1992 to 1994, and directed operas periodically for notable organizations such as the Salzburg Festival and the Vienna State Opera.

== Early life and education: 1911–1933 ==
Born in Cadegliano-Viconago, near Lake Lugano and the Italian–Swiss border, Menotti was the sixth of ten children of Alfonso and Ines Menotti. His father was a businessman and his mother a talented amateur musician. The family was financially prosperous with his father and uncle jointly operating a coffee exporting firm in Colombia. He learned to play the organ from his eccentric aunt LiLine Bianchini, who experienced religious hallucinations. He was deeply religious in his youth, and was greatly influenced by his parish priest Don Rimoldi.

Menotti's mother, who was highly influential in his musical development, sent all of her children to music lessons in the piano, violin, and cello. The family performed chamber music together, and with other musicians in the community in evenings hosted in the Menotti household.

A child prodigy, Gian Carlo began writing compositions when he was seven years old, and at eleven wrote both the libretto and music for his first opera, The Death of Pierrot. This work was performed as a home puppet show, a passion that occupied Gian Carlo's youth after he was introduced to the art by his older brother Pier Antonio. He began his formal musical training at the Milan Conservatory in 1924 at the age of 13. While at the conservatory, Menotti wrote his second childhood opera, The Little Mermaid. He spent three years studying at the conservatory, during which time he frequently attended operas at La Scala, which cemented his lifetime love for the artform.

At the age of 17, Menotti's life was dramatically altered by the death of his father. Following her husband's death, Ines Menotti and Gian Carlo moved to Colombia in a futile attempt to salvage the family's coffee business. In 1928 she enrolled him at Philadelphia's Curtis Institute of Music before returning to Italy. Armed with a letter of introduction from the wife of Arturo Toscanini, the teenager Gian Carlo studied composition at Curtis under Rosario Scalero. That same year, he met fellow Curtis schoolmate Samuel Barber, who became his partner in life as well as in their shared profession. As a student, Menotti spent much of his time with the Barber family in West Chester, Pennsylvania, and the two also spent several summer breaks in Europe attending opera performances in Vienna and in Italy while studying at Curtis.

== Early career: 1933–1949 ==
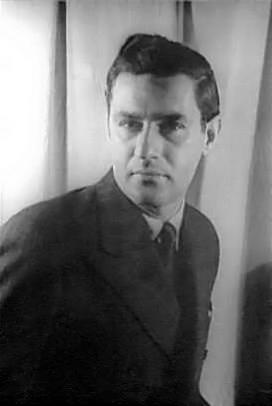
Gian Carlo Menotti, photographed by Carl Van Vechten in 1944

After graduating from the Curtis Institute in the spring of 1933, Menotti and Barber spent the following summer in Austria where Menotti began writing the libretto for his first mature opera, Amelia Goes to the Ball (Amelia al Ballo), to his own Italian text while staying in a small village on Lake Wolfgang. The work was inspired by the Baroness von Montechivsky whom Menotti met earlier that summer in Vienna. He spent the majority of the next four years pursuing further musical studies in Europe, including composition studies with Nadia Boulanger in Paris. He did not finish composing the music for Amelia until his return to the United States in 1937.

The Curtis Institute presented the world premiere of Amelia Goes to the Ball at the Academy of Music in Philadelphia with Margaret Daum as Amelia in April 1937, and this was soon followed by professional stagings later that year at the Lyric Opera House in Baltimore and the New Amsterdam Theatre in New York City with soprano Florence Kirk in the title role. A critical success, the work was staged by the Metropolitan Opera in 1938 with Muriel Dickson in the title role. The first international staging was in Sanremo, Italy, that same year. Amelia al ballo is the only one of Menotti's operas still to be published in its original or perhaps "complementary" Italian libretto (alongside the English): it is an example of the traditional romantic Italianate style, with a nod to Puccini, Wolf-Ferrari, and Giordano.

The success of Amelia Goes to the Ball earned Menotti a commission to compose a radio opera for the NBC Radio Network, The Old Maid and the Thief, one of the first such works. The opera premiered in a radio broadcast on April 22, 1939, with Alberto Erede conducting the NBC Symphony Orchestra for the closing of the orchestra's 1938–1939 season. The opera was first staged in a slightly revised version by the Philadelphia Opera Company at the Academy of Music in Philadelphia in 1941. The New York Philharmonic chose to program portions of the opera in 1942 with conductor Fritz Busch leading the ensemble. The first staged production in New York was presented by the New York City Opera in April 1948 in a double bill with Amelia Goes to the Ball, both operas directed by the composer.

In 1943, Menotti and Barber purchased "Capricorn", a house north of Manhattan in suburban Mount Kisco, New York. The home served as their artistic retreat up until 1972. Many of their major works were composed at this house. The two frequently hosted salon gatherings at Capricorn with other well known composers, artists, musicians, and intellectuals in attendance. American author William Goyen was a frequent visitor to the house and later Goyen's lover, American artist Joseph Glasco, became friends with and visited Menotti and Barber.

Menotti's third opera, The Island God, was written for the Metropolitan Opera where it premiered to poor reviews in 1942. He believed this work failed because the libretto he wrote relied too heavily on metaphysics which resulted in an overly pretentious philosophical and symbolic work that failed to connect with audiences. In interviews he expressed that this failure taught him "how not to write an opera". Following this, he wrote his first dramatic play without music, A Copy of Madame Aupic, in 1943. The work was not staged until 1947 when it premiered in New Milford, Connecticut. Other works from this period include a ballet, Sebastian (1944), and the Piano Concerto in F Major (1945) which were written before Menotti returned to opera with The Medium in 1946. Commissioned by the Alice M. Ditson Fund, this fourth opera premiered at Columbia University and then transferred to a critically successful run on Broadway at the Ethel Barrymore Theatre in 1947. This Broadway production also included Menotti's fifth opera, the short one act opera The Telephone, or L'Amour à trois, as a prelude to performances of The Medium. These operas became Menotti's first internationally successful works, notably receiving critically acclaimed productions in Paris and London in 1949 and later touring Europe in 1955 under the sponsorship of the United States Department of State with musical forces led by Thomas Schippers. The Medium was also made into a motion picture in 1951 starring Marie Powers and Anna Maria Alberghetti and competed in the 1952 Cannes Film Festival. It is widely regarded as one of the finest examples of opera on film ever made.

In the midst of this success, Menotti also composed music for the 1948 ballet Errand in the Maze for the Martha Graham Dance Company, and wrote two screenplays for Metro-Goldwyn-Mayer which were ultimately never developed into films. He accepted a position teaching music composition on the faculty of the Curtis Institute in 1948, a post he remained in until 1955. His notable pupils included composers Olga Gorelli, Lee Hoiby, Stanley Hollingsworth, Leonard Kastle, George Rochberg, and Luigi Zaninelli.

== Middle career: 1950–1969 ==
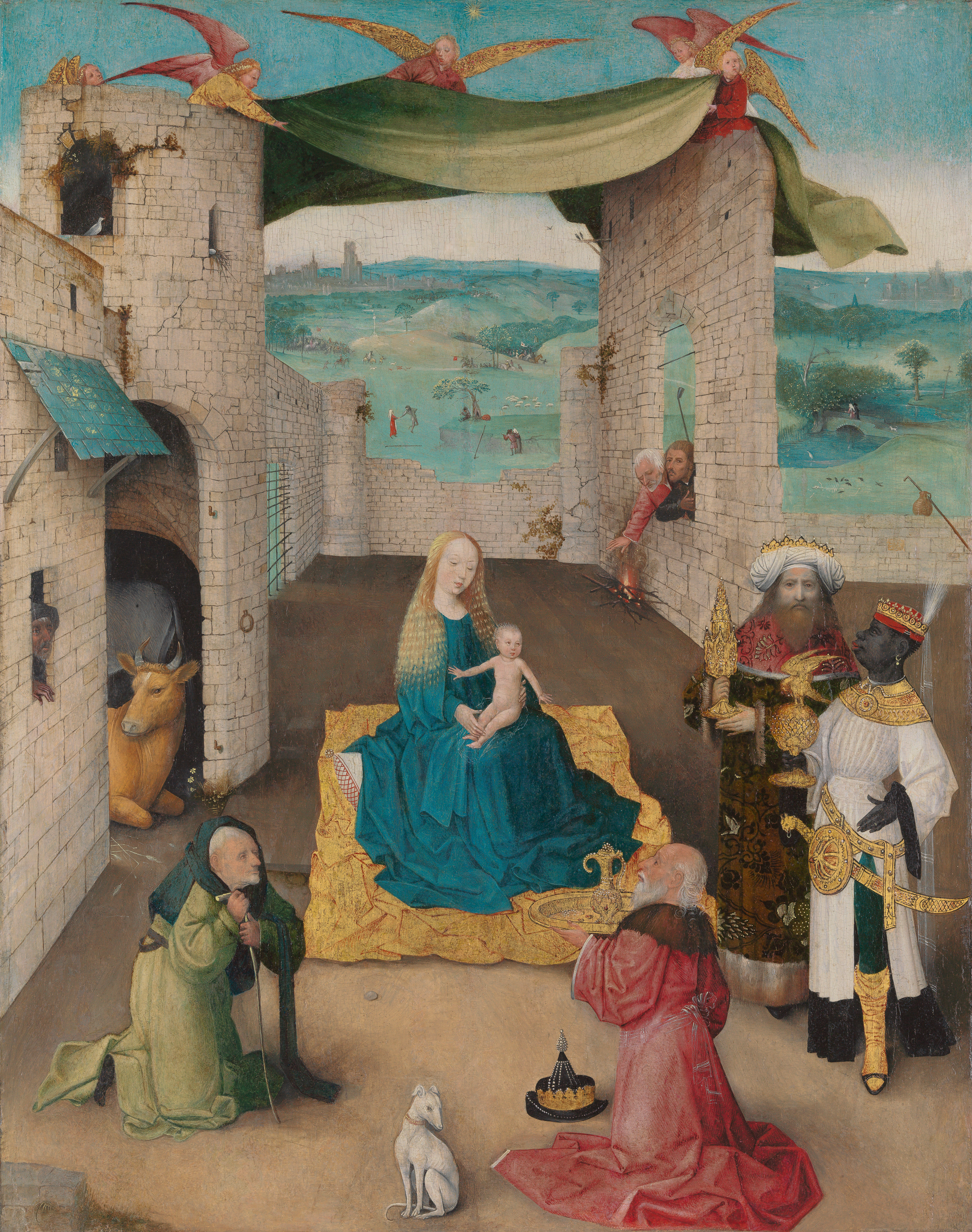
Hieronymus Bosch's Adoration of the Magi which inspired Menotti's Amahl and the Night Visitors (Metropolitan Museum, Object Number: 13.26)

The 1950s marked the pinnacle of Menotti's critical acclaim, beginning with his first full-length opera, The Consul, which premiered on Broadway at the Ethel Barrymore Theatre in 1950. The work won both the Pulitzer Prize for Music and the New York Drama Critics' Circle Award for Musical Play of the Year (the latter in 1954). American soprano Patricia Neway starred as the tormented protagonist Magda Sorel, for which she won the Donaldson Award for Best Actress in a Musical in 1950. Menotti apparently intended to give a role to a then-unknown Maria Callas, but the producer would not have it. The work has become a part of the established opera repertory, and has been performed in more than a dozen languages and over 20 countries.

In 1951, Menotti wrote his Christmas opera Amahl and the Night Visitors for NBC which was inspired by Hieronymus Bosch's painting Adoration of the Magi (c. 1485–1500). It was the first opera ever written for television in America, and first aired on Christmas Eve, 1951 with Chet Allen as Amahl and Rosemary Kuhlmann as his mother. The opera was such a success that the broadcasting of Amahl and the Night Visitors became an annual Christmas tradition. The work has also been staged by numerous opera companies, universities, and other institutions, and became one of the most frequently performed operas of the 20th century. The work remains Menotti's most popular work.

Menotti won a second Pulitzer Prize for his opera The Saint of Bleecker Street, which premiered at the Broadway Theatre in 1955. This work was also awarded the Drama Critics' Circle Award for best musical and the New York Music Critics' Circle Award for the best opera. Set in contemporary New York, the opera is concerned with the conflict of the physical and spiritual worlds. Following its New York run, the opera was staged at La Scala and the Vienna Volksoper, and was recorded for BBC Television in 1957. This work was followed by The Unicorn, the Gorgon, and the Manticore (1956), a "madrigal fable" for chorus, ten dancers and nine instruments which was based on the 16th century Italian madrigal comedy. Commissioned by the Elizabeth Sprague Coolidge Foundation, the work premiered at the Library of Congress in 1956 and was then staged by the New York City Ballet with dancers Nicholas Magallanes and Arthur Mitchell in 1957.

While working on The Unicorn, the Gorgon, and the Manticore', Menotti crafted the libretto for Barber's most famous opera, Vanessa, which premiered at the Metropolitan Opera in 1958. That same year his opera Maria Golovin premiered at the 1958 Brussels World's Fair. Commissioned by Peter Herman Adler and the NBC Opera, the production moved to the Martin Beck Theatre on Broadway in 1959 and was also filmed for a nationally televised broadcast on NBC. The cast remained constant throughout and included Neway, Ruth Kobart, Norman Kelley, William Chapman, and Richard Cross.

Menotti founded the Festival of Two Worlds in Spoleto, Italy in 1958. His compositional output slowed as his duties as director of the festival consumed his time. He wrote the libretti for Barber's one act opera A Hand of Bridge and Lukas Foss's Introductions and Good-byes, both of which premiered together at the Festival of Two Worlds in 1959. He later revised the libretto for Barber's Antony and Cleopatra (1966). Albert Husson adapted his first dramatic play without music, A Copy of Madame Aupic (1943), into a French language play which premiered in Paris in 1959. Music critic Joel Honig served as his personal secretary during the late 1950s.

1963 was a particularly busy year for Menotti. His television opera Labyrinth was premiered by the NBC Opera Theatre. Unlike Amahl and the Night Visitors, this opera was never intended to be transferred from television to the stage and was written with the intention of utilizing special camera effects that were unique to television. That same year the opera The Last Savage premiered at the Opéra-Comique in Paris, and that work was given a lavish production at the Metropolitan Opera in 1964. This opera was disparaged by the French and American press, but was particularly well received for performances at opera houses in Italy in succeeding years. Also in 1963, his cantata The Death of the Bishop of Brindisi concerning the Children's Crusade of 1212 premiered at the Cincinnati May Festival to good reviews.

Menotti wrote a chamber opera, Martin's Lie (1964) under commissioned by CBS for American television. Although not initially conceived as a work for the stage, the opera premiered in a live theatrical performance on June 3, 1964, at the Bristol Cathedral for the opening of the 17th annual Bath International Music Festival. The opera was subsequently filmed with the same cast for television under the direction of Kirk Browning, and was broadcast nationally by CBS for the opera's United States premiere on May 30, 1965.

In 1967 Thomas Schippers succeeded Menotti as director of the Festival of Two Worlds, although he continued on as President of the festival's board of directors for several more decades. That same year Menotti's song cycle Canti della lontananza was given its premiere at Hunter College by soprano Elisabeth Schwarzkopf for whom the work was written. He composed music for the 1968 production of William Shakespeare's Romeo and Juliet at the Théâtre National Populaire with director Michael Cacoyannis. In 1969 the children's opera Help, Help, the Globolinks! premiered at the Hamburg State Opera, and the work was performed at the Santa Fe Opera and the New York City Opera the year after.

== Later career: 1970–2007 ==
In 1970 Menotti made the difficult decision to end his lengthy romantic relationship with Samuel Barber. Barber had battled depression and alcoholism following the harsh critical reaction to his 1966 opera Antony and Cleopatra which had a negative impact on his creative productivity and his relationship with Menotti.' Barber had already begun to self isolate for long periods of time at a chalet in Santa Christina, Italy, and spent less and less time at Capricorn. Tensions grew between Menotti and Barber, leading Menotti to end their romantic attachment and put Capricorn up for sale in 1970. Capricorn sold in 1972, and the two men remained friends after their romantic involvement ceased.

In 1972 Menotti purchased Yester House, an 18th-century estate in the Lammermuir Hills, East Lothian, Scotland. He lived there until his death 35 years later. While there, he jokingly stated his Scottish neighbors referred to him as "Mr McNotti".

In 1974, he adopted Francis "Chip" Phelan, an American actor and figure skater he had known since the early 1960s. Chip, and later his wife, lived with Menotti at Yester House.

In 1970 Menotti's second drama without music, The Leper, was first performed in Tallahassee, Florida, on April 24, 1970. His opera The Most Important Man was commissioned by the New York City Opera, and was given its premiere at Lincoln Center in 1971. An opera focusing on racial tensions in America with a central black hero, the work was poorly received by most critics. However, Menotti personally believed that this was one of his best operas on par with The Consul and The Saint of Bleecker Street. His opera Tamu-Tamu premiered in 1973 at the Studebaker Theatre in Chicago as part of the IX Congress of the International Union of Anthropological and Ethnological Sciences.

The year 1976 was particularly fruitful for Menotti, with a series of premieres commissioned in honor of the bicentennial of the Declaration of Independence. The first of these was the cantata in nine parts for soloists, chorus and orchestra, "Landscapes and Remembrances," which premiered on May 8 in a performance by the Bel Canto Chorus and Milwaukee Symphony in Milwaukee. Filmed for national broadcast on PBS, the piece is Menotti's most autobiographical work with the text consisting of personal memories and incidents of the composer's own life in America. On June 1 the Opera Company of Philadelphia performed the world premiere of the comedic opera The Hero (1976) which satirized American politics, particularly the Watergate scandal. On August 4 of that same year the Philadelphia Orchestra presented the world premiere of Menotti's Symphony No. 1 ("Halcyon Symphony") at the Saratoga Performing Arts Center under the baton of Eugene Ormandy.

In 1977 Menotti founded Spoleto Festival USA, a companion festival to his Spoleto Festival (the other of its Two Worlds), in Charleston, South Carolina. For three weeks each summer, Spoleto is visited by nearly a half-million people. These festivals were intended to bring opera to a popular audience and helped launch the careers of such artists as singer Shirley Verrett and choreographers Paul Taylor and Twyla Tharp. In 1986, he extended the concept to a Spoleto Festival in Melbourne, Australia. Menotti was the artistic director during the period of 1986–88, but after three festivals there, he decided to withdraw – and took the naming rights with him. The Melbourne Spoleto Festival has now become the Melbourne International Arts Festival. Menotti left Spoleto USA in 1993 to take the helm of the Rome Opera.

In spite of these festival's claims on Menotti's time, which included directing plays as well as operas, he maintained an active artistic career. Many of his later operas are directed towards children, both as subjects and as performers, including The Egg (1976), The Trial of the Gypsy (1978), Chip and his Dog (1979), A Bride from Pluto (1982), The Boy who Grew too Fast (1982), and his final opera The Singing Child (1993). The San Diego Opera commissioned the opera La Loca (1979) as a 50th birthday gift for soprano Beverly Sills, and she performed the work both in San Diego and with the New York City Opera. The work tells the story of the daughter of Isabella and Ferdinand of Spain, and was the last opera Sills added to her repertory before retiring. In 1986 his opera Goya, written for Plácido Domingo, was given its première by the Washington National Opera. With Goya (1986), he utilized a traditional giovane scuola Italian style. His last opera for adults, The Wedding Day, premiered in Seoul, South Korea, in conjunction with the 1988 Summer Olympics conducted by Daniel Lipton.

In 1992, Menotti was appointed artistic director of the Teatro dell'Opera di Roma, a post he maintained for two years before being asked to resign over conflicts with the theatre's managers involving Menotti's insistence of staging Wagner's Lohengrin. In honour of the 1995 Nobel Peace Prize, the American Choral Directors Association commissioned Gloria as part of the Mass celebrating the occasion. In 1996 Menotti directed his second filmed version of Amahl and the Night Visitors.

Menotti died on February 1, 2007, at the age of 95, at Princess Grace Hospital in Monaco, where he had a home. He was buried near his home, at Yester Kirkyard, Gifford, East Lothian. In June and July 2007 the Festival of Two Worlds, which Menotti founded and oversaw until his death, dedicated the 50th anniversary of the festival to his memory, organised by his son Francis. Menotti works performed during the festival included For the Death of Orpheus, Two Spanish Visions, Muero porque no muero (Santa Teresa D'Avila), Oh llama de amor viva! (San Giovanni della Croce), Missa O Pulchritudo.

== Musical style and critical assessment ==
Menotti's style was particularly influenced by Giacomo Puccini and Modest Mussorgsky, and he further developed the verismo tradition of opera in the post-World War II era. Rejecting atonality and the aesthetic of the Second Viennese School, his music is characterized by expressive lyricism which carefully sets language to natural rhythms in ways that highlight textual meaning and underscore dramatic intent. In explaining his rejection of many of the composition trends of musical modernism, Menotti stated: "Atonal music is essentially pessimistic. It is incapable of expressing joy or humor." Menotti wrote skilfully for smaller instrumental ensembles, and his orchestrations tend to be lighter and open. A composer who purposefully chose to cater to the tastes of the general public, his use of tonal melodies often had a modal flavor, frequently used sequence and repetition; they are easily remembered. In his operas his aria-like passages tend to be brief so as not to interrupt the dramatic flow, while his recitative-like passages carefully used natural speech rhythms that make the text easily understood by audiences. In 1964 he wrote:

There is a certain indolence towards the use of the voice today, a tendency to treat the voice instrumentally, as if composers feared that its texture is too expressive, too human.

While principally writing in the verismo style, Menotti did use some newer 20th century harmonic techniques and language when they served the dramatic intent of his works. For example, he uses 12-tone music ironically in Act 2 of The Last Savage to parody contemporary civilization (and indirectly the avant-garde composer); electronic tape music to represent the invaders from outer space in Help, Help, the Globolinks!, and a lengthy sustained high dissonant chord in The Consul at the moment of Magda's suicide. Even in his tonal harmonic passages he would sometimes break traditional harmonic progression rules by employing parallel harmony.

Reactions to Menotti's works ranged widely. His early career was mainly marked by critical and commercial success, with the operas Amelia Goes to the Ball (1937), The Old Maid and the Thief (1939), The Medium (1946), The Telephone (1947), The Consul (1950), Amahl and the Night Visitors (1951), and The Saint of Bleecker Street (1954) all demonstrating popular appeal and overall favorable reviews. Music critic and editor Winthrop Sargeant of Time, The New Yorker and Musical America was a particular admirer of Menotti who championed the composer in his reviews for his skillful merge of music and theater. In contrast, Joseph Kerman wrote in the 1956 edition of his widely read Opera as Drama, "Menotti is a trivial artist, a sensationalist in the old style, and in fact a weak one, diluting the faults of Strauss and Puccini with none of their fugitive virtues." However, Kerman later tempered his assessment, and retracted this statement in the 1988 revision of the book.

Kerman's scathing attack on Menotti was the beginning of an ambivalent relationship with music criticism for the composer which increased in the critical climate of the 1960s in which reviewers favored serialism and the musical avant-garde over Menotti's Italian verismo-inspired style. Viewed as a regressive musical conservative in this period, critics tended to dismiss his work as derivative or overly melodramatic. This negative reaction to Menotti's music continued into the 1980s, but then softened as tastes shifted away from serialism and the avant-garde towards neo-romanticism. Writing in The Independent at the time of Menotti's death in 2007, music critic Peter Dickinson wrote:

The reaction against Menotti's popularity was, for a time, disproportionately extreme. The movement towards neo-romanticism during the last 20 years has tended to favour Barber, who used an excellent libretto from Menotti for his grand opera Vanessa, produced at the Met in 1958. But for sheer theatrical craft and human curiosity, sustained by his own complex emotional make-up, Menotti created a telling verismo of the Second World War era.

== List of Menotti's operas ==
Sources:

- The Death of Pierrot (1922)
- The Little Mermaid (1923, lost)
- Amelia Goes to the Ball (Amelia al ballo) (1937)
- The Old Maid and the Thief, radio opera (1939)
- The Island God (1942)
- The Medium (1946)
- The Telephone, or L'Amour à trois (1947)
- The Consul (1950)
- Amahl and the Night Visitors, television opera (1951)
- The Saint of Bleecker Street (1954)
- Maria Golovin (1958)
- Labyrinth, television opera (1963)
- The Last Savage (1963)
- Martin's Lie (1964)
- Help, Help, the Globolinks! (1968)
- The Most Important Man (1971)
- Tamu-Tamu (1973)
- The Egg (1976)
- The Hero (1976)
- The Trial of the Gypsy (1978)
- Chip and his Dog, on commission for the CCOC (1979)
- La Loca (1979)
- A Bride from Pluto (1982)
- The Boy Who Grew Too Fast (1982)
- Goya (1986), with Plácido Domingo in the title role
- The Wedding Day (Giorno di Nozze) (1988)
- The Singing Child (1993)

== Other works ==
- Pastoral and Dance for Strings and Piano (1934)
- Sebastian, ballet (1944)
- Piano Concerto (1945)
- Errand into the Maze, ballet (1947)
- Symphonic poem, Apocalypse (1951)
- Violin Concerto (1952)
- Ricercare and Toccata on a Theme from The Old Maid and the Thief (1953)
- The Unicorn, the Gorgon, and the Manticore (1956), a madrigal fable for chorus, instruments, and dancers
- The Death of the Bishop of Brindisi (1963)
- Canti della lontananza for voice and piano (1961)
- Triple Concerto a tre (1969)
- Suite for Two Cellos and Piano (1973)
- Fantasia for Cello and Orchestra (1975)
- Symphony No. 1, Halcyon (1976)
- Landscapes and Remembrances (1977)
- Cantilena and Scherzo for harp and string quartet (1977)
- Missa 'O Pulchritudo' (1979) mass with inserted text
- Moans, Groans, Cries And Sighs (A Composer At Work), AATBBB, a cappella (1981)
- Muero porque no muero, cantata for St. Teresa (1982)
- Nocturne for Soprano, String Quartet and Harp (1982)
- Five Songs for voice and piano (1983)
- Double-Bass Concerto (1983)
- My Christmas, for chorus and orchestra (1987)
- For the Death of Orpheus (1990), cantata for tenor, chorus and orchestra
- Oh llama de amor viva (1991)
- Trio for Violin, Clarinet and Piano (1996)
- Jacob's Prayer (1997)

== Honors ==
In 1984 Menotti was awarded a Kennedy Center Honor for achievement in the arts, and in 1991 he was chosen as Musical America's' "Musician of the Year".

In 1997, he was awarded the Brock Commission from the American Choral Directors Association.

In 2010, the main theatre in Spoleto was renamed as the Teatro Nuovo Gian Carlo Menotti to honour his role as creator and spirit of the festival.

== Publications ==
Vocal scores of his compositions:

- Amahl and the Night Visitors: Vocal Score. G. Schirmer Inc., 1986. ISBN 0-88188-965-2.
- The Telephone: Vocal Score. G. Schirmer Inc., 1986. ISBN 0-7935-5370-9.
- The Medium: Vocal Score. G. Schirmer Inc., 1986. ISBN 0-7935-1546-7.
- Mass for the Contemporary English Liturgy. G. Schirmer Inc., 1990.

== See also ==
- See: List of music students by teacher: K to M#Gian Carlo Menotti.
