= Lee Hoiby =

American composer (1926–2011)

Lee Henry Hoiby (February 17, 1926 – March 28, 2011) was an American composer and classical pianist. Best known as a composer of operas and songs, he was a disciple of composer Gian Carlo Menotti. Like Menotti, his works championed lyricism at a time when such compositions were deemed old-fashioned. His most well known work is his setting of Tennessee Williams's Summer and Smoke, which premiered at the St Paul Opera in 1971.

== Biography ==
Hoiby was born in Madison, Wisconsin. A child prodigy, he began playing the piano at the age of 5. He studied at the University of Wisconsin under notable pianists Gunnar Johansen and Egon Petri. He then became a pupil of Darius Milhaud at Mills College.

Hoiby became influenced by a variety of composers, particularly personalities in the twentieth century avant garde, including the Pro Arte String Quartet led by Rudolf Kolisch, brother-in-law of Arnold Schoenberg. During his youth, Hoiby played with Harry Partch's Dadaist ensembles. Following his studies at Mills College, he entered the Curtis Institute of Music where he was mentored in music composition by Gian Carlo Menotti, who introduced Hoiby to opera, and involved him in the Broadway productions of The Consul and The Saint of Bleecker Street. Though at first he intended to pursue a career as a concert pianist, he eventually became more interested in composing.

Hoiby died on March 28, 2011, aged 85, in New York City from metastatic melanoma. He was survived by his partner and longtime collaborator, Mark Shulgasser.

== Career ==
Hoiby's first opera, The Scarf, a chamber opera in one act, which was produced by Menotti and premiered in 1957, was recognized by TIME and the Italian press as the hit of the first Spoleto Festival. His next opera, Natalia Petrovna (New York City Opera, 1964), now known in its revised version as A Month in the Country, based on a play by Ivan Turgenev, was also praised by critics. Hoiby's setting of Tennessee Williams's Summer and Smoke is perhaps his most famous work. Its libretto is by Lanford Wilson, and it was premiered in 1971 by St Paul Opera, Minnesota, under the conductor Igor Buketoff. Among Hoiby's other operatic works are the one-act opera buffa Something New for the Zoo (1979), the musical monologue The Italian Lesson (1981, text by Ruth Draper) which was produced off-Broadway in 1989 with Jean Stapleton, The Tempest (1986), and a one-act chamber opera, This Is the Rill Speaking (1992), text by Lanford Wilson. He contributed the song "The Darkling Thrush," with text by Thomas Hardy, to a 2006 multimedia opera, Darkling. Elements of this song were used as source material for the opera's remaining solo and ensemble music, written by composer Stefan Weisman. Hoiby's last opera was a setting of Romeo and Juliet (2004), which still awaits its world premiere.

He continued his work with Bishop's poetry in a new chamber work, commissioned by American Opera Projects, with scenario by Mark Shulgasser for mezzo-soprano, baritone, piano and instrumental ensemble, lasting approximately one hour. An excerpt from the piece received its first reading in New York at New York City Opera's "VOX: Showcasing American Opera" program in May 2006. His three-movement Summer Suite for Wind Ensemble was premiered on February 25, 2008, by the Austin Peay State University Wind Ensemble under the direction of Dr. Gregory Wolynec. The composer elaborates on the history of the piece:

Summer Suite is a transcription for concert band of one of my first orchestral works. The last movement is a rousing parade, and when the opportunity presented itself last year I decided to recast it for concert band. Greg Wolynec and his players at Austin Peay State University enjoyed it sufficiently to encourage me to work on the first two movements for them. Rethinking the first movement (which was originally titled Scherzo) was a challenge and education, particularly in dealing with the lack of high strings, and tempo considerations. The second movement was a piece of cake, and I'm especially pleased with the way the long theme fits the french horn. I feel like my twenty-six year old self has made a gift to my present self.

Hoiby wrote Last Letter Home in 2006 to the words of U.S. PFC Jesse Givens, who died in an accident while serving in Iraq.

=== Songs ===
Soprano Leontyne Price introduced many of his best known songs and arias to the public. His songs are known for being inspired by music from many time periods and cultures. He comments about songwriting "What I learned from Schubert came from a long, deep and loving exposure to his songs. A lot happens on a subconscious level, so it's hard to verbalize, but what I think his songs taught me have to do primarily with the line, the phrasing, the tessitura, the accentuations of speech, the careful consideration of vowels, the breathing required, and an extremely economical use of accompaniment material, often the same figure going through the whole song."

One of the early proponents of Hoiby's songs in Europe was the soprano Juliana Janes-Yaffé, who, in the 1980s, recorded several of Hoiby's songs for Südwestfunk Baden-Baden, Germany (with conductor John Yaffé, at the piano). His choral music is widely performed throughout the US and in Great Britain. Indeed, some of his most important works are in that form, including the Christmas cantata A Hymn of the Nativity (text by Richard Crashaw), the oratorio Galileo Galilei (libretto by Barrie Stavis), and a substantial group of works for chorus and orchestra on texts of Walt Whitman.
