= Ezra Laderman =

American composer (1924–2015)

Ezra Laderman (29 June 1924 – 28 February 2015) was an American composer of classical music. He was born in Brooklyn.

== Biography ==
Laderman was of Jewish heritage. His parents, Isidor and Leah, both emigrated to the United States from Poland. Though poor, the family had a piano. He wrote, "At four, I was improvising at the piano; at seven, I began to compose music, writing it down. I hardly knew it then, but I had at a very early age made a giant step to becoming a composer." He attended New York City's High School of Music and Art.

On April 25, 1943, Laderman was inducted into the United States Army and served as a radio operator with the 69th Infantry Division during World War II. He wrote:

We were in Caversham, England poised to enter the war. It was here that I learned that my brother Jack had been shot down and killed in Germany. The Battle of the Bulge, crossing the Rhine at Remagen, liberating Leipzig, meeting the Russians at Torgau on the bank of the Elbe were the points in this constellation that was filled with tension and waiting, victory and grief. We became aware of the horror, and what we now call the 'holocaust,' while freeing Leipzig.

During the weeks after the war was over, Laderman composed his Leipzig Symphony. This work brought him recognition within the army, and subsequently he was assigned as orchestrator of the GI Symphony Orchestra.

Laderman was discharged from the army on April 22, 1946. He studied composition under Stefan Wolpe of New York City and Miriam Gideon of Brooklyn College where he earned his B.A. in 1950. He then went on to study under Otto Luening of Columbia University where he earned his M.A. in 1952. Laderman's compositions range from solo instrumental and vocal works to large-scale choral and orchestral music. He has also written music to the Academy Award-winning films The Eleanor Roosevelt Story and Black Fox.

Laderman has been commissioned three times by the Philadelphia Orchestra, twice by the National, Louisville and Chicago Symphonies as well as from the New York Philharmonic, Detroit, Pittsburgh, Los Angeles Philharmonic, Dallas, Houston, Fort Worth, Syracuse, Denver, Columbus, Albany, and New Haven Symphony Orchestras. In 1971 he collaborated with Alfredo Antonini – Musical Director of the CBS Symphony Orchestra during the television premier of his opera And David Wept.. In addition he has written for such distinguished artists as Jean-Pierre Rampal, Yo-Yo Ma, Emanuel Ax, Sherrill Milnes, Aldo Parisot, Samuel Baron, David Shifrin, Ransom Wilson, Judith Raskin, Elmar Oliveira, Erica Morini, Nathaniel Rosen, Stephen Kates, Toby Appel, and Leonard Arner, among many others.

From 1971 to 1982 he was Professor of Music Composition at the State University of New York, Binghamton and Senior Composer in Residence. In 1979 he became the director of the Music Program at the National Endowment for the Arts In 1991 he was elected into the membership of the American Academy of Arts and Letters and, in 2006, he was elected president for a three-year term ending in 2009. In 2004 he was awarded an honorary MusD from the State University of New York, Binghamton. Through June 2014 Laderman taught music composition at Yale University's School of Music . A resident of Teaneck, New Jersey, Laderman was named as Dean at the Yale School of Music in 1989 and served in that position to 1995. He died on 28 February 2015 at the age of 90.

Laderman's notable students have included Sarah Kirkland Snider, Judd Greenstein, and Trevor Gureckis.

== Awards ==
- 1956 Guggenheim Fellowships
- 1964 Rome Prize American Academy in Rome
- 1983 Rome Prize American Academy in Rome
- 1987 The Barlow Endowment for Music Composition award at BYU.edu commission for Orchestra with Emanuel Ax (piano) titled Second Piano Concerto. Barlow 1987 commission award recipients
