= Lee Venora =

American singer and actress (born 1932)

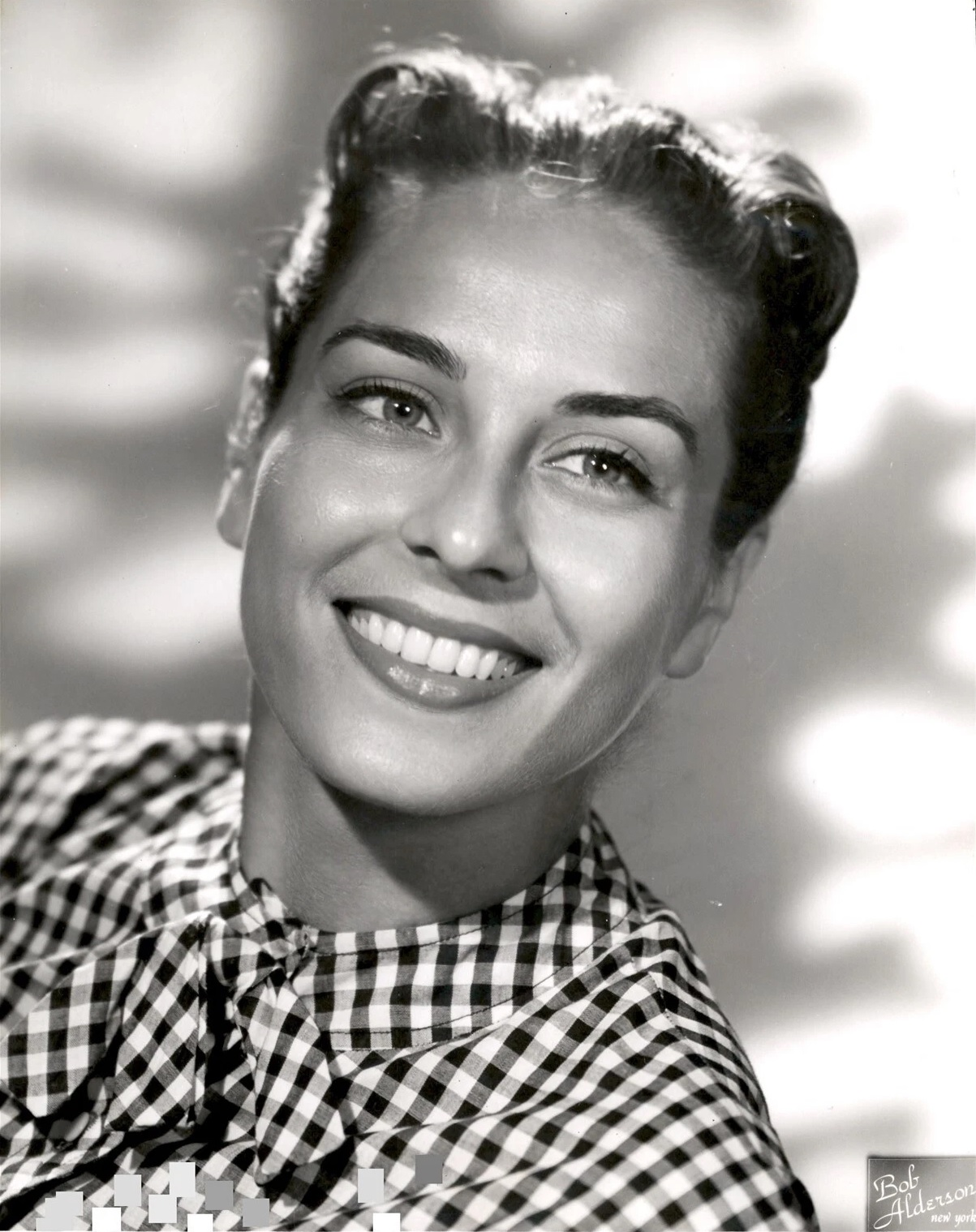
- Venora in 1963
- Born: Elena Sinaguglia; February 16, 1932 (age 94); Bridgeport, Connecticut, U.S.
- Occupations: Actress, singer
- Years active: 1955–1978

Lee Venora (born February 16, 1932) is an American operatic soprano and musical theater actress. She was highly active with the New York City Opera between 1957 and 1967 and a regular performer at the San Francisco Opera between 1961 and 1966. She also appeared in a few Broadway musicals, Lincoln Center revivals, and national tours of musicals during her career. Composer and conductor Leonard Bernstein was an admirer of her voice, and she performed with him and the New York Philharmonic on a number of occasions during the late 1950s and early 1960s. She also sang with the orchestra on a couple of recordings and appears on a few musical recordings as well.

== Biography ==
Born in Bridgeport, Connecticut, as Elena Sinaguglia, Venora studied singing at the Hartt School of Music. She made her first appearance at the New York City Opera (NYCO) on April 6, 1958, as The Girl in the first professional production of Mark Bucci's Tale for a Deaf Ear with Patricia Neway as Laura Gates, William Chapman as Tracy Gates, and Arnold Gamson conducting. In the 1958-59 season she returned to the NYCO to sing Micaela in Georges Bizet's Carmen with Regina Resnik in the title role and Richard Cassilly as Don Jose, Lucia in Benjamin Britten's The Rape of Lucretia with Frances Bible in the title role, the title role in Carlisle Floyd's Susannah with Joshua Hecht as Olin Blitch, the title role in Norman Dello Joio's The Triumph of St. Joan with Mack Harrell as Cauchon and Chester Ludgin as the Jailer, and Consuelo in the world premiere of Robert Ward's He Who Gets Slapped with Norman Kelley as Count Mancini and Regina Sarfaty as Zinida.

In 1959, she portrayed Monica in Menotti's The Medium and Sophie in Richard Strauss's Der Rosenkavalier with the New York Philharmonic (NYP) under the baton of Leonard Bernstein for Bernstein's CBS television program Omnibus. She performed with that orchestra under Bernstein again for a televised Christmas concert in December 1959 and the role of Regina in a concert performance of Paul Hindemith's Mathis der Maler in May 1960. She appeared on Bernstein's Omnibus again in March 1962 as Micaela and that same year recorded Johann Sebastian Bach's Magnificat with the NYP. Her other performances with the NYP include Gustav Mahler's Symphony No. 2 with Jennie Tourel in 1963 (also recorded) and a concert of Gilbert and Sullivan works in 1964.

She made her Broadway debut as Molly Bixby in October 1959 in the short-lived musical Happy Town. On March 14, 1960, she performed the world premiere of four song cycles, one each by composers Stanley Hollings-Worth, Paul Ramsier, Charles Turner, and Lee Hoiby respectively, in recital at Carnegie Hall. In January 1961 she sang the role of Drusilla in Claudio Monteverdi's L'incoronazione di Poppea with the American Opera Society under conductor Nicola Rescigno. The following June she sang Zerbinetta in Strauss's Ariadne auf Naxos at the Cincinnati Opera with Eleanor Steber in the title role, and in July she was seen as Leïla in Bizet's Les pêcheurs de perles at the Empire State Music Festival. In November 1961 she returned to Broadway as Anna Danby in Robert Wright and George Forrest's Kean. She also sang on the cast recording of the show made with Columbia Records.

On May 5, 1961, Venora made her first of many appearances at the San Francisco Opera (SFO) as Mimì in Giacomo Puccini's La Bohème opposite George Shirley as Rodolfo. She returned to the SFO annually through 1964, portraying such roles as Blanche in Francis Poulenc's Dialogues of the Carmelites, Concepción in Maurice Ravel's L'heure espagnole, Esmerelda in Bedřich Smetana's The Bartered Bride, the Guardian of the Temple Gates in Strauss's Die Frau ohne Schatten, Juliette in Charles Gounod's Roméo et Juliette, Klingsor's Maiden in Richard Wagner's Parsifal, Lauretta in Puccini's Gianni Schicchi, Leila, Marzelline in Ludwig van Beethoven's Fidelio, Micaëla, Norina in Gaetano Donizetti's Don Pasquale, Susannah, and the title role in Puccini's Manon Lescaut. She returned again in 1966 to portray Cherubino in Wolfgang Amadeus Mozart's Le Nozze di Figaro, Gilda in Giuseppe Verdi's Rigoletto, and Nannetta in Verdi's Falstaff.

Venora returned to the NYCO on March 22, 1962, to portray Deborah in the world premiere of Abraham Ellstein's The Golem under conductor Julius Rudel.

She returned to the company twice in the next two months to reprise the roles of Susannah and Monica (with Lili Chookasian as Madame Flora). Shortly thereafter she appeared as Marsinah in the Los Angeles Civic Light Opera's 1962 revival of Kismet which started in Los Angeles and then toured the United States. She sang the role of Carrie Pipperidge in a 1962 recording of Rodgers and Hammerstein's Carousel.

In March 1964 Venora made her first appearance at New York City's Town Hall giving a recital of mostly contemporary American works with accompanist David Garvey. She returned to the NYCO later that month to portray the title role in Gilbert and Sullivan's Patience. She went on to portray roles in two Lincoln Center revivals: Tutptim in The King and I (1964, with Risë Stevens as Anna and Darren McGavin as the King) and again Marsinah in Kismet (1965); both of which were recorded. She made one last appearance at the NYCO in 1966, portraying the title character in Puccini's Madama Butterfly. In November 1968 she portrayed Mimì to the Rodolfo of John Stewart at the San Diego Opera.

In 1974, Miss Verona appeared in the world premiere of Hans Werner Henze's Rachel, la cubana, for WNET Opera Theatre, opposite Susanne Marsee and Alan Titus, conducted by the composer.
