= Joshua Hecht =

American operatic bass (1928–2019)

Joshua Hecht (March 4, 1928 – March 29, 2019) was an American operatic bass.

== Biography ==
Born in New York City, the son of Russian Jewish immigrants, he received a Bachelor of Arts from New York University, in 1951.

Hecht was a student of Rosa Ponselle, and made his formal debut with her company, the Baltimore Civic Opera, in 1953, as the Comte des Grieux in Manon. Two years later, he first appeared with the New York City Opera, as Monterone in Rigoletto, with Cornell MacNeil in the name part. From 1955 to 1960, the bass sang with that ensemble, as Colline in La bohème, Cesare Angelotti in Tosca, Sparafucile in Rigoletto (with Aldo Protti, later Louis Quilico, as the jester), Ferrando in Il trovatore (conducted by Julius Rudel), Oronte in Rolf Liebermann's School for Wives, the Elder Ott in the New York premiere of Carlisle Floyd's Susannah (with Phyllis Curtin and Norman Treigle, conducted by Erich Leinsdorf), Alonso in the American premiere of Frank Martin's Der Sturm, Timur in Turandot, Banco in Macbeth, William Jennings Bryan in the New York premiere of Douglas Moore's The Ballad of Baby Doe (with Beverly Sills, directed by Vladimir Rosing), Horace Giddens in the world premiere of Marc Blitzstein's Regina, Farfallo in Die schweigsame Frau, Collatinus in The Rape of Lucretia, the Reverend Olin Blitch in Susannah, Jabez Stone in Douglas Moore's The Devil and Daniel Webster (directed by John Houseman), Tirésias in Oedipus rex (with Richard Cassilly, conducted by Leopold Stokowski), the Police Agent in The Consul (with Patricia Neway and Chester Ludgin, conducted by Werner Torkanowsky), Plutone in L'Orfeo, and Don Alonso in Così fan tutte. In 1958 he portrayed a psychiatrist in the world premiere of Robert Kurka's The Good Soldier Schweik for the NYCO at Lincoln Center.

Hecht sang again with the City Opera from 1967 to 1970, as the Baron Scarpia in Tosca, Sarastro in Die Zauberflöte, Sergeant Abe Goldberg in the world premiere of Hugo Weisgall's Nine Rivers from Jordan, the Comte des Grieux (directed by Tito Capobianco), and Méphistophélès in Faust (staged by Frank Corsaro). He returned to the company in 1979, for Tosca.

He appeared throughout the United States, as well as Israel, Australia, Canada, and South America. Between 1972 and 1996, Hecht lived in Europe, first Italy, then Germany. In 1986, he portrayed Leopold Bloom in the world premiere of Hans Zender's Stephen Climax at the Oper Frankfurt.

In 1956, Hecht sang in Il trovatore (opposite Herva Nelli) for San Francisco's Cosmopolitan Opera. For the New Orleans Opera Association, he also sang Il trovatore, in 1961. The next year, Hecht was the Raimondo for Lily Pons's final appearances in Lucia di Lammermoor, with the young Plácido Domingo as Edgardo, at the Fort Worth Opera. In 1965, he sang the title role in Der fliegende Holländer at the Metropolitan Opera, and, in 1969, he sang in Manon (with Sills) and Lucia di Lammermoor (with Sills and Luciano Pavarotti) in Mexico City. In 1970, he sang the Villains in Les contes d'Hoffmann, opposite Dame Joan Sutherland, at the Seattle Opera.

Other conductors with whom Hecht collaborated included Leonard Bernstein, Karl Böhm, Richard Bonynge, Renato Cellini, Christoph von Dohnányi, Sir Charles Groves, Walter Herbert, Georges Prêtre, Nicola Rescigno, Joseph Rosenstock, Sir Malcolm Sargent, Robert Shaw, William Steinberg, Silvio Varviso, and Marcello Viotti.

From 1986 until 1992, Hecht was the resident teacher at the Frankfurt Opera, and, since 1995, he had been a guest teacher at Opera Australia. He was also Adjunct Associate Professor of Music at Hofstra University. Joshua Hecht died on March 29, 2019, at the age of ninety-one, in Sydney, Australia.

== Commercial discography ==
- Blitzstein: Regina (Lewis; Krachmalnick, 1958) Columbia
- Moore: The Ballad of Baby Doe (Sills, Bible, Cassel; Buckley, 1959) MGM (Deutsche Grammophon)
- Ponchielli: La Gioconda: excerpts (Tebaldi, Corelli, Colzani; Guadagno, 1966) [live] Bel Canto Society
