= David Atkinson (baritone) =

Canadian opera singer

David Anthony Stuart Atkinson (born David Burke; October 20, 1921 – October 4, 2012) was a Canadian baritone and New York Broadway actor/singer. Most of his career was spent performing in musicals and operettas in New York City from the late 1940s through the early 1970s, although he did appear in some operas and made a few television appearances. In 1952 he created the role of Sam in the world premiere of Leonard Bernstein's Trouble in Tahiti. From 1956-1962 he was a leading performer at the New York City Opera where he starred in several musicals and appeared in the world premieres of several English language operas. His greatest success on the stage came late in his career: the role of Cervantes in Man of La Mancha which he portrayed in the original Broadway production (replacing Richard Kiley), the 1968 national tour, and in the 1972 Broadway revival.

== Life and career ==
Born David Burke in Montreal, Atkinson grew up in Saint-Romuald, Quebec. While his parents were native English speakers, his community was French speaking and he learned to speak both languages as a child. After studies at Bishop's College School, he served in the Royal Canadian Air Force during World War II in the South Pacific just prior to Japan's surrender. After the war he studied music at McGill University in 1946. He left McGill in 1947 after winning a scholarship to attend the Juilliard School in New York. He remained at Juilliard for only one year, leaving the school to begin his career as a musical theatre performer in the Fall of 1948. He continued to study singing privately with Harry Jompulsky in New York City.

While studying at Juilliard, Atkinson made his professional opera debut using his birth name 'David Burke' with the Opera Guild of Montreal (OGM) in January 1948 as Monterone in Giuseppe Verdi's Rigoletto. The following May he performed the role of the High Priest of Dagon in Camille Saint-Saëns's Samson and Delilah with the OGM. In September 1948 he made his Broadway debut under the name "John Atkinson" (Atkinson being his mother's maiden name) succeeding John Tyers as Franz Liszt in the musical revue Inside U.S.A. He remained with the production for the musical's first national tour after it closed in New York in February 1949.

In 1950 Atkinson starred as Captain Jim Stewart in Harry Tierney Rio Rita at the Bucks County Playhouse with Annamary Dickey in the title role. In 1951 he performed in several productions at the Paper Mill Playhouse, including the roles of Prince Franz in Victor Herbert's Sweethearts, Edvard Grieg in Robert Wright and George Forrest's Song of Norway, and Pierre Birabeau in Sigmund Romberg's The Desert Song. In June 1952 he portrayed Sam in the world premiere of Bernstein's Trouble in Tahiti at Berstein's Festival of the Creative Arts on the campus of Brandeis University to an audience of nearly 3,000 people. The following November he reprised the role of Sam in a nationally televised broadcast of Trouble in Tahiti presented by the NBC Opera Theatre (NBCOT). He would later sing the role of Sam again at the New York City Opera (NYCO) in 1958. In 1953 he performed the role of Don Jose in Georges Bizet's Carmen with Vera Bryner in the title role for NBCOT.

In 1954 Atkinson returned to Broadway to star as Clyde Hallam in the original cast of Sigmund Romberg's The Girl in Pink Tights. In 1955 he starred opposite Carol Channing in the original Broadway production of John La Touche's The Vamp. In 1956 he portrayed two roles in musical revivals mounted by the NYCO at Lincoln Center: Frederick C. Graham to Kitty Carlisle's Lilli Vanessi in Cole Porter's Kiss Me, Kate and Gaylord Ravenal in Jerome Kern's Show Boat. He returned to Lincoln Center in 1957 to perform the role of Tommy Albright in the NYCO's revival of Lerner and Loewe's Brigadoon which then moved to the Adelphi Theatre on Broadway. That same year he portrayed Jack Worthing in Who's Earnest?, a musical adaptation of Oscar Wilde's The Importance of Being Earnest which was broadcast on the television program The United States Steel Hour. In 1958 he created the role of Doctor Gregg in the world premiere of Douglas Moore's opera Gallantry at the now-destroyed Brander Matthews Theater on 117th Street. He was also seen at Lincoln Center in 1958 as Frank Butler in the NYCO's revival of Annie Get Your Gun and as Lieutenant Henry Lukash in the world premiere of Robert Kurka's opera The Good Soldier Schweik. He also portrayed the role of Billy to Jan Clayton's Julie and Ruth Kobart's Nettie in Rodgers and Hammerstein's Carousel in a production at the Brussels World's Fair. In 1959 he starred at the NYCO in a revival of Say, Darling and as Pantaloon in the world premiere of Robert Ward's He Who Gets Slapped with Norman Kelley as Count Mancini and Regina Sarfaty as Zinida. Also in 1959, he appeared in the San Francisco Light Opera Company's production of At the Grand, as the Judge in a revival of Can-Can in Central Park, and appeared as Count Danilo Danilovitsch in a made for television production of Franz Lehár's The Merry Widow for CBC Television.

In 1960 Atkinson returned to the NYCO to portray Larry Foreman in Marc Blitzstein's The Cradle Will Rock. In 1961 he took over the role of Mack the Knife in the Off-Broadway revival of Kurt Weill's The Threepenny Opera at the Theater de Lys, but left that production after just a few weeks to create the role of Jack Absolute in the world premiere of Bruce Geller's All In Love at the Martinique Theatre in New York City. In 1963 he replaced Ronald Holgate as Captain Miles Gloriosus in the original Broadway production of Stephen Sondheim's A Funny Thing Happened on the Way to the Forum. In 1964 he performed the role of Phileas Fogg in a musical adaptation of Around the World in Eighty Days at the Nikon at Jones Beach Theater. He returned to Jones Beach in 1965 to star in the musical Mardi Gras!.

In 1967 Atkinson took over the role of Cervantes in the original Broadway production of Man of La Mancha, and in 1968 he performed the role in the National touring production. He notably sang the song 'The Impossible Dream' live at the 22nd Tony Awards. He returned to the Broadway cast of the show in 1969. He later played Cervantes again for the matinee performance only in the 1972 Broadway revival of the show, and at the Coachlight Dinner Theater in Nanuet, New York in 1980. In 1973 he performed in Brian Friel's play, The Freedom of the City at the Royal Court Theatre in London.

Atkinson died in New York in 2012.

== See also ==
- List of Bishop's College School alumni
