= Regina Sarfaty =

American opera singer (1934–2024)

Regina Sarfaty (November 1934 – December 23, 2024), later Regina Sarfaty Rickless after her marriage to Elwood A. Rickless in 1963, was an American operatic mezzo-soprano who had an active career during the 1950s through the 1980s. Sarfaty first rose to prominence through her work at the Santa Fe Opera and the New York City Opera during the late 1950s. She later enjoyed international success in the 1960s and 1970s, and had a particularly lengthy career singing with the Zurich Opera. Sarfaty died on December 23, 2024, at the age of 90.

== Biography ==
Born in November 1934 in Rochester, New York, Sarfaty grew up in Brooklyn, New York. She won the Margaret McGill Scholarship to The Juilliard School, She matriculated there in 1952 and studied voice with Florence Kimball. She graduated five years later with a Bachelor of Music.

Sarfaty won several awards in her years as a young singer. These included the Florence Eaton Award from the Berkshire Music Center, the Leopold Schepp Foundation Award, the Martha Baird Rockefeller Music Fund Prize, and the Naumburg Award. While a student at Juilliard, she began to perform professionally in concerts. In 1956 she created the role of Zinida in the world premiere of Robert Ward's He Who Gets Slapped at the Juilliard School; a role she would later perform with the New York City Opera in 1959.

Sarfaty made her professional opera debut in 1957 as Suzuki in Madama Butterfly at the Santa Fe Opera under conductor John Crosby. It was the very first production of that opera company, and Sarfaty was the very first singer to appear on the stage of the Santa Fe Opera. She scored her first major success with that company that same season as Rosina in The Barber of Seville. She gave three other performances with the company during that summer season, Suzuki in Puccini's Madama Butterfly, Baba the Turk in The Rake's Progress, and Tabitha in the world premiere of Marvin David Levy's The Tower. Sarfaty returned regularly to the SFO through 1968, portraying such roles as Clarion in Richard Strauss's Capriccio, Dorabella in Così fan tutte, Meg Page in Falstaff, Jane Seymour in Anna Bolena, Prince Orlofsky in Die Fledermaus, and the title roles in Regina and Carmen (conducted by Robert Craft, in 1961), among others. She also sang the role of Anna in Les Troyens (conducted by Robert Lawrence, in 1959), Nelly in the world premiere of Carlisle Floyd's Wuthering Heights in 1958 (with Phyllis Curtin) and Agave in the United States premiere of Hans Werner Henze's The Bassarids in 1968 with the SFO.

In 1958 Sarfaty made her debut with the New York City Opera as the Widow Zimmerlein in Strauss's Die schweigsame Frau. She sang regularly with the NYCO through 1962, in roles like Angelina in La cenerentola, Cherubino in The Marriage of Figaro, the title role in Maria Golovin, and Jocasta in Oedipus Rex. She sang in two world premieres with the company, the role of "the Mezzo" in Hugo Weisgall's Six Characters in Search of an Author (opposite Beverly Sills), and in Douglas Moore's The Wings of the Dove. In 1960 she starred as the Secretary in the third New York City Center revival of Gian Carlo Menotti's The Consul alongside fellow artists Patricia Neway as Magda, Chester Ludgin as John, and Werner Torkanowsky conducting. This production which recorded and broadcast on the Telemeter network in March 1961. In 2004 this recording was released by VAI.

In 1959, the mezzo-soprano sang Adele in Bellini's Il pirata, opposite Maria Callas, for the American Opera Society, at Carnegie Hall, a performance that was much later issued by EMI on Compact Discs. In 1960, she portrayed The Secretary in a film of Menotti's The Consul, with Patricia Neway and Chester Ludgin, conducted by Werner Torkanowsky. The film was not seen until 2004, when it was published on DVD by VAI. On the concert stage she performed with the New York Philharmonic as the alto soloist in Beethoven's Symphony No. 9 in 1964 under conductor Leonard Bernstein; sharing the stage with fellow soloists Martina Arroyo, Nicholas di Virgilio, and Norman Scott. The performance was recorded and released by Columbia Records in 1969.

Sarfaty made her European debut as Octavian in Der Rosenkavalier in 1960 at the Glyndebourne Festival, returning there twenty four years later to portray Adelaide in Arabella. She sang Carmen for her debut with the Frankfurt Opera in 1963, also singing Octavian with the company that season. Appearances at other major opera houses soon followed, including the Bavarian State Opera and the Vienna State Opera. In 1969 she sang Carmen at the Opéra National de Paris.

Sarfaty joined the roster of principal singers at Zurich Opera in the early 1960s and remained active there up through the late 1970s. In Zurich she was particularly admired for her portrayal of Countess Geschwitz in Alban Berg's Lulu. She also appeared in the world premiere of Rudolf Kelterborn's Die Befreiung Thebens in Zurich in 1963.

Sarfaty continued to appear in operas into the mid-1980s. In 1981 she sang Mrs Herring in Albert Herring at the Grand Théâtre de Genève. One of her last appearances was at the Baltimore Opera in 1984 as Madame Croissy in Dialogues of the Carmelites.
