= Patricia Neway =

American opera & theater singer (1919–2012)

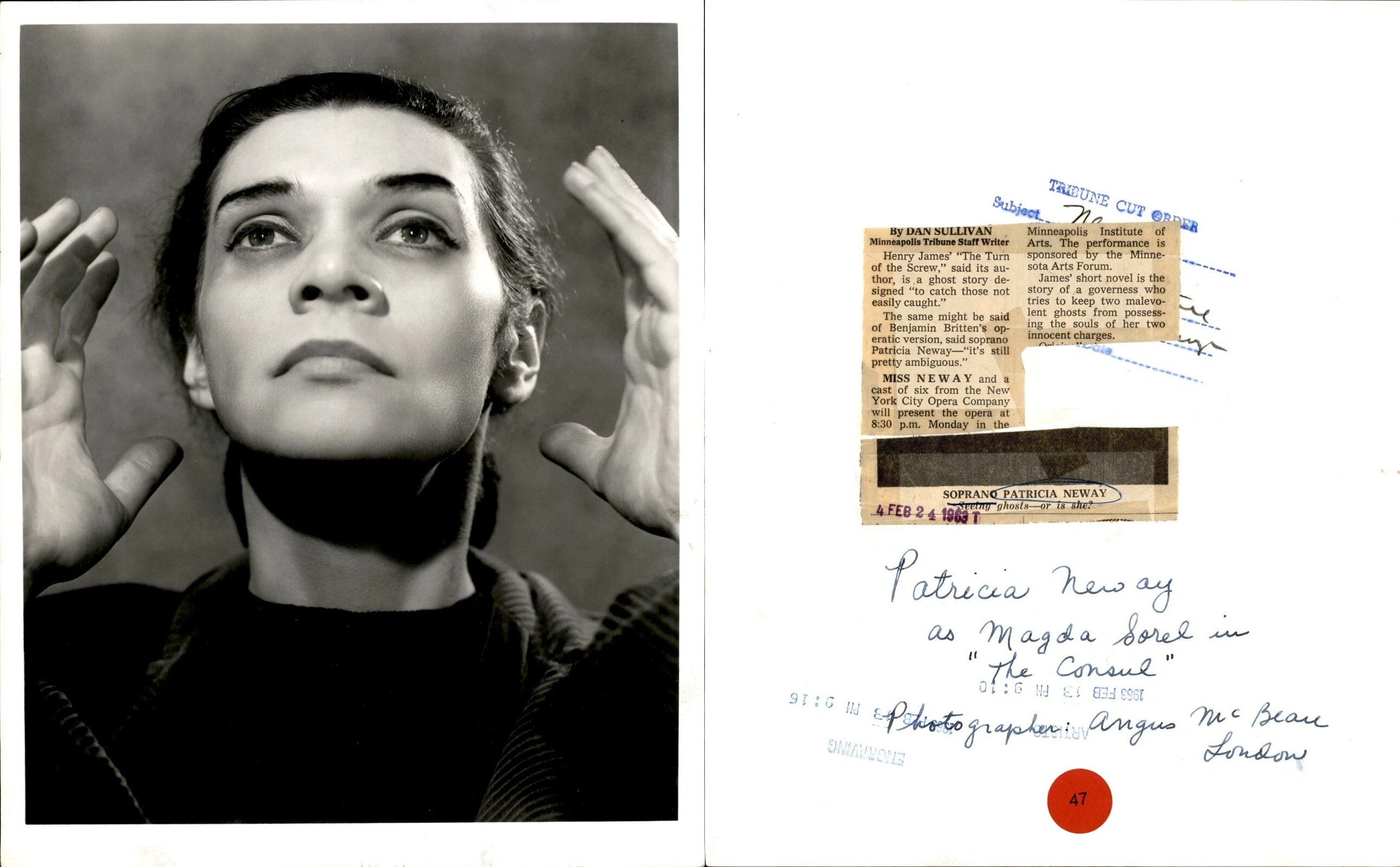
- Neway in 1963
- Born: 30 September 1919; Kensington, Brooklyn, U.S.
- Died: 24 January 2012 (aged 92); Corinth, Vermont, U.S.
- Occupations: Soprano, actress
- Years active: 1946–1970s
- Spouses: Morris Gesell (divorced) John Francis Byrne (m. 1968; died 2008)

Patricia Neway (September 30, 1919 – January 24, 2012) was an American operatic soprano and musical theatre actress who had an active international career during the mid-1940s through the 1970s. One of the few performers of her day to enjoy equal success on both the opera and musical theatre stages, she was a regular performer on both Broadway and at the New York City Opera during the 1950s and 1960s.

Critic Emily Langer of The Washington Post wrote that, "Neway was a rare type of singer — one with the classical training and raw vocal strength to meet the demands of opera as well as the acting talent and appeal required to succeed in musical theater." She is particularly remembered for creating roles in the world premieres of several contemporary American operas, most notably Magda Sorel in Gian Carlo Menotti's The Consul. On Broadway she won a Tony Award for her portrayal of the Mother Abbess in the original production of Rodgers and Hammerstein's The Sound of Music.

== Biography ==
Born on Ditmas Avenue in Kensington, Brooklyn to Irish-American parents, Neway grew up in Rosebank, Staten Island. Her father was a printing plant foreman who had briefly worked in vaudeville as the high tenor in a vocal quartet. She attended the Notre Dame Academy on Staten Island and then Notre Dame College, where she earned a degree in the sciences with a minor in mathematics. Although she had studied piano briefly as a child, her interest in music and singing awakened in her years at Notre Dame College after she began singing through a book of Neapolitan songs that her uncle had given to her father as a present. What began as a hobby turned into a passion and following her graduation from Notre Dame she entered the Mannes College of Music, where she earned a degree in vocal performance. She later studied singing with tenor Morris Gesell, whom she eventually married.

While still a student, Neway made her Broadway debut as a member of the chorus in a 1942 production of Jacques Offenbach's La Vie parisienne. In April 1944 she was the soprano soloist in the world premiere of Norman Dello Joio's The Mystic Trumpeter with conductor Robert Shaw and the Collegiate Chorale at Town Hall. She made her first opera appearance in a leading role in 1946, as Fiordiligi in Così fan tutte, at Chautauqua Opera. In 1948, she returned to Broadway to portray the Female Chorus in the United States premiere of Benjamin Britten's The Rape of Lucretia, at the Ziegfeld Theatre.

In 1950, Neway made opera history when she starred as Magda Sorel in the world premiere of Gian Carlo Menotti's critically acclaimed Cold War-era opera The Consul at the Shubert Theatre in Philadelphia, with Cornell MacNeil as John Sorel, Gloria Lane as the secretary of the consulate, and Marie Powers as the Mother. Later that year, she went with the production to the Ethel Barrymore Theatre on Broadway, where it ran for 269 performances. Neway (alternating with Yul Brynner's sister, Vera Brynner) also led the Broadway cast, this time with Rosemary Kuhlmann as the secretary of the consulate. She later recorded the role for Decca Records, and performed the role for the premieres in London, Paris, and other European cities. Neway, Kuhlmann, and Powers also performed these roles in the UK at the Cambridge Theatre in February 1951, with Norman Kelley playing the role of the magician Nika. For her work in the Broadway production she won the Donaldson Award for Best Actress in a Musical in 1950.

In 1951, Neway made her debut with the New York City Opera (NYCO), where she returned often through 1966. Her first appearance with the company was as Leah in the world premiere of David Tamkin's The Dybbuk on April 10, 1951, with Robert Rounseville as Channon. She also notably sang in the world premiere of Hugo Weisgall's Six Characters in Search of an Author in 1959, with Beverly Sills. Among the many other productions she appeared in with the NYCO were: Mascagni's Cavalleria rusticana (as Santuzza, conducted by Julius Rudel), Alban Berg's Wozzeck (as Marie, directed by Theodore Komisarjevsky), Menotti's The Consul (as Magda), Amahl and the Night Visitors (as the Mother), and The Medium (as Mme Flora), Bucci's Tale for a Deaf Ear (as Laura Gates), Carlisle Floyd's Wuthering Heights (as Nellie, opposite Phyllis Curtin as Catherine); Benjamin Britten's The Turn of the Screw (as the Governess, with Richard Cassilly as Peter Quint), and Richard Strauss's Salome (as Herodias), among others.

While singing largely at the NYCO, Neway continued to perform with other opera companies and on Broadway. In 1952 she sang and recorded the title heroine in Gluck's Iphigénie en Tauride at the Aix-en-Provence Festival. Between 1952–1954 she was engaged as a principal soprano at the Opéra-Comique, in Paris. While there, she gave two of the greatest performances of her opera career, portraying the title role in Giacomo Puccini's Tosca, and the role of Katerina Mihaylovna in Franco Alfano's Risurrezione. In 1955, she sang in the world premiere of Raffaello de Banfield's Una lettera d'amore di Lord Byron in New Orleans, with Astrid Varnay. In 1957 she portrayed Madame de Croissy for NBC Opera Theatre's production of Poulenc's Dialogues of the Carmelites, with Rosemary Kuhlmann as Mother Marie, Elaine Malbin as Blanche, and Leontyne Price as Mme Lidoine.

Neway notably portrayed Miriam in the world premiere of Lee Hoiby's The Scarf at the very first Festival dei Due Mondi in Spoleto, Italy on June 20, 1958. In August 1958, she sang the role of the Mother in the world premiere of Menotti's Maria Golovin at the Brussels World's Fair. She continued with the production when it premiered on Broadway in November 1958, at the Martin Beck Theatre, under the umbrella of the NBC Opera Theatre. The following year she sang the role again with the New York City Opera in addition for recording the role for a national television broadcast on NBC.

In June 1959, Neway returned to the Spoleto Festival to portray Geraldine in the world premiere of Samuel Barber's A Hand of Bridge (which she recorded in 1960). The following November she returned to Broadway where she originated the role of the Mother Abbess in the original Broadway production of The Sound of Music, for which she won the Tony Award for Best Performance by a Featured Actress in a Musical, in 1960.

In 1963, Neway created the role of Jenny MacDougald in the world premiere of Carlisle Floyd's The Sojourner and Mollie Sinclair, in Raleigh, North Carolina, opposite Norman Treigle as Lachlan Sinclair, and conductor Julius Rudel.

In 1964, she performed the role of Lady Thiang in The King and I at Lincoln Center with Risë Stevens as Anna and Darren McGavin as the King. In 1966, she made her first appearance at the San Francisco Opera, as the Governess in The Turn of the Screw. She returned there in 1972 to play the Widow Begbick in Kurt Weill's Rise and Fall of the City of Mahagonny.

In 1967, she appeared as Nettie in a special television production of Carousel, starring Robert Goulet as Billy Bigelow. Her featured solo was the song "You'll Never Walk Alone". In 1970 she created the role of the Queen in the world premiere of Menotti's stage play, The Leper.

Neway's other repertoire included Arnold Schönberg's Erwartung.

== Retirement and death ==
After retirement, Neway moved to Corinth, Vermont, where she lived with her second husband, John Byrne, until Byrne's death in 2008. Her first marriage, to Morris Gesell, had ended earlier in divorce. In 2009 she donated papers and artifacts related to her father-in-law's Chaocipher cipher system to the National Cryptologic Museum. She died at her home in Corinth on January 24, 2012, aged 92.

== Videography ==
- Menotti: The Consul (Ludgin; Torkanowsky, Dalrymple, 1960) VAI
