= Venora =

Venora is a surname. Notable people with the surname include:

- Diane Venora, American actor
- Lee Venora (born 1932), American opera singer and actor
