= Chester Watson (bass-baritone) =

American opera singer (1911–1979)

Chester Watson (September 6, 1911 – January 8, 1979) was an American bass-baritone singer who had an active performance career in operas and concerts from the late 1940s into the 1970s. He was particularly active as a performer in opera on American television with the NBC Opera Theatre. He also made appearances with several American opera companies, including the New York City Opera, the Lyric Opera of Chicago, and the Opera Society of Washington. He is best known for creating roles in the world premieres of several American operas, including the First Police Agent in Gian Carlo Menotti's The Consul (1950), Father Julien in Norman Dello Joio's The Trial at Rouen (1956), Palivec in Robert Kurka's The Good Soldier Schweik (1958), and Leonard Swett in Thomas Pasatieri's The Trial of Mary Lincoln (1972). He notably starred opposite Maria Callas as Goffredo in the American Opera Society's lauded 1959 production of Vincenzo Bellini's Il pirata, which was later issued as a live recording by EMI Classics. On the concert stage he appeared frequently with the National Symphony Orchestra during the 1950s, and also made guest appearances as a soloist with other American symphonies like the New York Philharmonic.

== Life and career ==
Born in Brooklyn, Watson was trained in vocal performance at St. Lawrence University. After college he enlisted in the United States Army where he served until the end of World War II. He began his singing career in New York City in 1946 after his discharge, with several early success being national radio broadcasts with the CBS Symphony Orchestra (CBSSO) on CBS Radio. These included the first recording of Paul Hindemith's When Lilacs Last in the Dooryard Bloom'd (1946); Polyphemus in George Frideric Handel's Acis and Galatea (1946); and the part of Siméon in Claude Debussy's L'enfant prodigue with Bernard Herrmann conducting the CBSSO in 1947. His first major opera role was the First Police Agent in the original Broadway production of Gian Carlo Menotti's The Consul at the Ethel Barrymore Theater in 1950. He continued on tour with that production to Philadelphia and Montreal in 1951, this time in the larger role of Mr. Kofner. In 1953 he starred in the one act television opera The Parrot by composer Darrell Peters which was created as part of the Armstrong Circle Theatre anthology series.

This was followed by several appearances on television with the NBC Opera Theatre in the 1950s and 1960s, including the role of Father Julien in the world premiere of Norman Dello Joio's The Trial at Rouen in 1956. Other operas he performed on television with that company included Lukas Foss's Griffelkin (the Lion, 1955), Giacomo Puccini's La bohème (as Benoit, 1956), Mozart's The Magic Flute (1956), Prokofiev's War and Peace (as Count Rostov, 1957), Verdi's La traviata (as Dottore Grenvil, 1957), Beethoven's Fidelio (as Rocco, 1961), Debussy's Pelléas et Mélisande (1962), and Donizetti's Lucia di Lammermoor (as Raimondo, 1964). In 1958 he created the role of Palivec in Robert Kurka's The Good Soldier Schweik with the New York City Opera at Lincoln Center. That same year he appeared in two operas with the Lyric Opera of Chicago; the roles of Tchelkalov in Boris Godunov and Betto di Signa in Gianni Schicchi.

In 1959 Watson returned to Broadway to portray Luke Granger in the short-lived musical Happy Town. That same year he performed and recorded the role of Goffredo in the American Opera Society's lauded production of Vincenzo Bellini's Il pirata starring Maria Callas at Carnegie Hall. He performed with the AOS again the following year in performance of Hector Berlioz's Les Troyens with conductor Thomas Beecham at DAR Constitution Hall. In 1960 he was committed to the Lyric Opera of Chicago, portraying the roles of Antonio in Mozart's The Marriage of Figaro, Bonze in Puccini's Madama Butterfly, Cirillo in Umberto Giordano's Fedora, and Pietro in Verdi's Simon Boccanegra. In 1961 he portrayed the role of Sarastro in Mozart's The Magic Flute with the Opera Society of Washington (OSW). In 1962 he returned to the OSW to perform and record the role of Tiresias in Igor Stravinsky's Oedipus rex with the composer conducting. In 1969 he appeared at the Santa Fe Opera in Stravinsky's The Nightingale. His last major opera performance was as Leonard Swett in the world premiere of Thomas Pasatieri's The Trial of Mary Lincoln in 1972 for National Educational Television.

Watson was also active on the concert stage throughout the United States, and was particularly admired for his performances of the works of Johann Sebastian Bach, George Frideric Handel, and Christoph Willibald Gluck. He often appeared as a soloist in concerts with the Oratorio Society of New York and with the Musica Aeterna Chorus and Orchestra. In 1950s he was the bass soloist in several concerts with the National Symphony Orchestra and conductor Paul Callaway at the Washington National Cathedral, including Beethoven's Missa solemnis (1951); Bach's Mass in B minor (1953); Handel's Messiah (1953); and Handel's Israel in Egypt (1958). In 1961 he sang the role of Friar Lawrence in Berlioz's Roméo et Juliette with the New York Philharmonic with Nan Merriman as Juliette; a performance which was broadcast nationally. Some of the other concert works in his repertoire included Beethoven's Mass in C major, Haydn's The Creation, and Mozart's Requiem.

In addition to his work as a performer, Watson worked as a voice teacher. He died at the age of 65 in his home in Manhattan in 1979. He was married to Elizabeth Rustigin Watson. The music critic Martin Bernheimer honored Watson in his 1979 Beckmesser Awards; awards which he annually announced in the Los Angeles Times as a means of celebrating and critiquing achievement in the fine arts.
