= Ruth Morley =

Austrian-born American costume designer (1925–1991)

- Born: Ruth Miriam Birnholz; November 19, 1925; Vienna, Austria
- Died: February 12, 1991 (aged 65); Bronx, New York, US
- Occupation: Costume Designer
- Years active: 1951–1991
- Children: Melissa and Emily Hacker

Ruth Morley (November 19, 1925 – February 12, 1991) was an Austrian-born American costume designer, active from the late 1950s through 1991. She was nominated for Best Costumes-Black and White for her work on The Miracle Worker during the 35th Academy Awards. She is also well known for her work on Annie Hall.

Ms. Morley's stage work began in 1951, with Billy Budd. Other Broadway productions included Death of a Salesman, starring Dustin Hoffman, as well as A Thousand Clowns, Toys in the Attic, Inherit the Wind, and Take a Giant Step. In the 1950s she was costume director for the New York City Opera (NYCO). Her notable costume designs for the NYCO included the world premiere of Robert Kurka's The Good Soldier Schweik at Lincoln Center in 1958.

== Selected filmography ==
- The Prince of Tides (1991)
- Ghost (1990)
- The Money Pit (1986)
- Tootsie (1982)
- Little Miss Marker (1980)
- The Miracle Worker (1979-TV movie)
- Kramer vs. Kramer (1979)
- Superman (1978)
- Annie Hall (1977)
- Taxi Driver (1976)
- Diary of a Mad Housewife (1970)
- A Thousand Clowns (1965)
- The Miracle Worker (1962)
- The Hustler (1961)

== Personal life ==
Ruth Morley, née Birnholz, was born in Vienna, Austria, and escaped shortly before the outbreak of World War II on a Kindertransport. She had two daughters.

She died at the age of 65 of breast cancer in New York, USA.
