= Werner Torkanowsky =

German-American violinist and conductor (1926–1992)

Werner Torkanowsky (March 30, 1926 - October 20, 1992) was a German-American conductor, composer and violinist.

== Career ==
Torkanowsky was born in Berlin, Germany. His parents immigrated to Israel when he was 6 years old where they raised Torkanowsky on a kibbutz. He moved to the United States in 1948 to study violin with Raphael Bronstein and from 1954 to 1958, he studied conducting with Pierre Monteux. Following his debut with the Ballets Espagnoles, he became music director for Jerome Robbins's "Ballet USA."

After receiving the Naumburg Award in 1961, Torkanowsky made his debut with the New York Philharmonic and the New York City Opera, where he conducted Gian Carlo Menotti's The Medium and The Consul, for which he also served as conductor for a film of the opera, starring Patricia Neway and Chester Ludgin. He went on to conduct many major orchestras, including those in Israel, Philadelphia, Boston, Chicago, Los Angeles and Detroit, as well as Samuel Barber's opera Vanessa at the Spoleto Festival.

In 1961 and 1962, he conducted the Naumburg Orchestral Concerts, in the Naumburg Bandshell, Central Park, in the summer series.

From 1963 to 1977, Torkanowsky was music director and chief conductor of the New Orleans Philharmonic-Symphony Orchestra. He also conducted performances of Arrigo Boito's Mefistofele with Norman Treigle, for the San Diego Opera (1973) and Seattle Opera (1974). In 1981, he was named director and chief conductor of the Bangor Symphony Orchestra in Maine, where he remained until he succumbed to cancer on October 20, 1992 in Bar Harbor, Maine, at the age of sixty-six. Following his death, the Symphony published a double Compact Disc set of various performances dating from 1989 to 1992.

His son, David Torkanowsky, is a jazz performer in New Orleans.

== Bibliography ==
- "Staying in Shape: A Violinist's Maintenance Notebook", by Werner Torkanowsky, Phœbus Apollo Music Publishers, 1992. ISBN 0-9753953-1-9
