= Rosemary Kuhlmann =

American opera singer and actress (1922–2019)

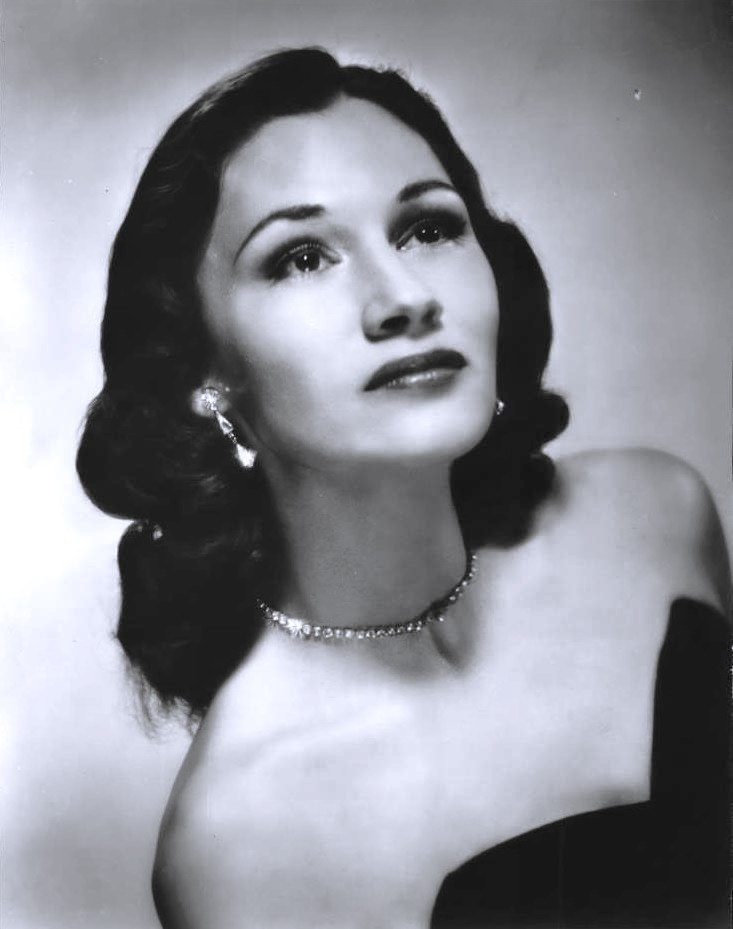
- Kuhlmann in 1955
- Born: 30 January 1922; New York City, New York, U.S.
- Died: 17 June 2019 (aged 97); Rhode Island, U.S.
- Occupations: Mezzo-soprano, ctress
- Years active: 1950–1961

Rosemary Kuhlmann (January 30, 1922 – August 17, 2019) was an American operatic mezzo-soprano and Broadway musical actress best known for originating the role of the Mother in Gian Carlo Menotti's Amahl and the Night Visitors, the first opera commissioned for television. Kuhlmann portrayed the role on the annual live NBC broadcast of the production from 1951 through 1962.

== Early life and education ==
Rosemary Kuhlmann was born in New York City. She attended high school in Staten Island, graduating in 1939. After graduating from high school she worked as a model for Lord & Taylor and then later as a secretary at Chase Manhattan. With the outbreak of World War II she joined the WAVES. While in the WAVES, Kuhlmann was sent to the University of Wisconsin–Madison where she and a hundred and ten other women learned Morse code for three months.

Kuhlmann then returned to New York and worked six days a week "sending Morse code to the ships at sea." She also performed on radio programs promoting the WAVES and soon had her own weekly show, Navy Serenade, on WNEW where she would sing popular songs of the day.

Following the war, Kuhlmann was accepted into the Juilliard School on a full scholarship through the GI Bill. While at Juilliard, Kuhlmann studied with Lucia Dunham and participated in several opera productions including playing the part of Polly in John Gay's The Beggar's Opera. At this time in her life, although she loved to sing, she was not in love with opera. She remarked, "[In opera] it seemed like people stood for hours saying 'goodbye' and 'goodbye,' and nothing happened. My friend Pat Neway took me to Die Walküre at the Metropolitan Opera. I hated it." In 1950, Kuhlmann graduated from the Juilliard School with a degree in Vocal Performance.

== Career ==
After graduating from Juilliard, Kuhlmann joined the Robert Shaw Chorale. Although contracted to sing with the ensemble for two years, Kuhlmann broke her contract when she was cast as the Secretary in Gian Carlo Menotti's Broadway production of The Consul, replacing Gloria Lane who had performed the role at its premiere in Philadelphia. Kuhlmann said, "Everybody said Robert Shaw wouldn't let me out of my contract, but he did. Menotti's music turned me on to opera. It was so real—the vocal and the dramatic melded. When I did The Consul, it wasn't even like I was singing. I was living it, and the music value was just fantastic."

In 1951, Kuhlmann originated the role of Sadie in William Roos, Jack Lawrence and Don Walker's Broadway musical Courtin' Time at the Nederlander Theatre (then known as the National Theatre) with her co-stars including Billie Worth, Joe E. Brown, Carmen Mathews, and Joseph Sweeney. After this production closed, she joined the ensemble of the 1951 Broadway musical revival of Music in the Air, directed by Oscar Hammerstein II. During this production, Kuhlmann was invited by Chandler Cowles, who had produced The Consul, to audition for Menotti for the part of the Mother in his new opera Amahl and the Night Visitors at the Mark Hellinger Theatre. Kuhlmann said of this audition, "I sang 'Voi lo sapete' and some art songs in English. Gian Carlo walked up to the stage and said, 'You're a little young, but we'll make you look like a Biblical woman.' They whisked me over to sing for NBC Opera producer Samuel Chotzinoff, and that was it. I had the role."

Kuhlmann went directly from the closing of Music in the Air to rehearsals of Amahl and the Night Visitors in late November 1951. Rehearsals lasted approximately one month with Menotti, television director Kirk Browning, and conductor Thomas Schippers. In an interview, Kuhlmann said, "The crowning glory was having Toscanini attend one of the rehearsals. He kissed me on the cheek with tears in his eyes."

On Christmas Eve 1951, Amahl and the Night Visitors was telecast live on NBC with Kuhlmann. The broadcast drew an estimated viewership of five million people. The following morning—Christmas Day—The New York Times ran a front-page review by Olin Downes on Menotti's "tender and exquisite" new opera. The article praised Kuhlmann's "moving portrayal, enhanced by the resources of her voice." The forty-five-minute work became an annual tradition, airing live for twelve consecutive Christmases with the same adult cast members—Kuhlmann as the Mother and David Aiken, Leon Lishner and Andrew McKinley as the Three Kings. The role of Amahl, originated by Chet Allen, was played in later broadcasts by Bill McIver and Kirk Jordan, both of whom played it opposite Kuhlmann.

After the premiere of Amahl and the Night Visitors, Kuhlmann's career took off. In 1952, a few weeks after the premiere and the LP studio recording, Kuhlmann toured Europe with Menotti, once again playing the Secretary in The Consul. That same year, Kuhlmann made her debut with the New York City Opera in a stage production of Amahl and the Night Visitors. She returned to the New York City Opera several more times during the 1950s for other productions, including the roles of Magda in The Consul, the title role in Bizet's Carmen, Meg Page in Verdi's Falstaff, Angelina in Gioacchino Rossini's La Cenerentola, Nicklausse in Offenbach's Les Contes d'Hoffmann and the Tsarina in The Golden Slippers.

During the 1950s and early 1960s, Kuhlmann was a frequent guest artist with symphony orchestras and played Giorgetta on a CBC telecast of Puccini's Il Tabarro. She also starred in summer operettas in Dallas and St. Louis.

In 1956, George Abbott and Harold Prince cast Kuhlmann as Meg in the national tour of Damn Yankees. She left the tour in early 1957 to marry Hugh Evans, an executive at Yachting and Boating magazine. That same year, Kuhlmann performed two more operas with NBC: Desideria in Menotti's The Saint of Bleecker Street and the devout Mother Marie in Poulenc's Dialogues of the Carmelites, with Elaine Malbin as Blanche, Patricia Neway as the Old Prioress and Leontyne Price as Mme. Lidoine.

In 1961, Kuhlmann made her last original NBC Opera telecast in Leonard Kastle's Deseret as Brigham Young's eldest wife, Sarah. After this production, Kuhlmann retired to raise a family with her husband. Kuhlman said, "Life is all about time and place. Everyone—my teachers, my coach and my agent, Gus Schirmer—thought my next step was to sing at the Met. But then I met my husband and wanted to raise a family. Maybe I could have done both, and that would have been wonderful. But I would never give up what I have today—my two children and five grandchildren—to have said on my résumé that I sang at the Met."

In 1978, Kuhlmann divorced her husband and took what was supposed to be a four-month temporary position at PepsiCo. Her temporary job turned into a sixteen-year career as the executive assistant to the international vice president of the company. Kuhlmann retired from PepsiCo in 1994, then worked for five years as the executive assistant to the director of the Westchester Conservatory of Music before "retiring for good" in 1999.

In 2001, Kuhlmann was reunited with Menotti at New York's Museum of Television & Radio for a fiftieth-anniversary salute to Amahl. On January 20, 2006, she returned to the same Museum for a fiftieth-anniversary salute to Dialogues of the Carmelites, with a screening of the NBC Opera production. She died in August 2019 at the age of 97 in Rhode Island.
