= NBC Opera Theatre =

American opera company

The NBC Opera Theatre (sometimes mistakenly spelled NBC Opera Theater and sometimes referred to as the NBC Opera Company) was an American opera company operated by the National Broadcasting Company from 1949 to 1964. The company was established specifically for the purpose of televising both established and new operas for television in English. Additionally, the company also gave live theatrical presentations of operas, sponsoring several touring productions in the United States and mounting works on Broadway.

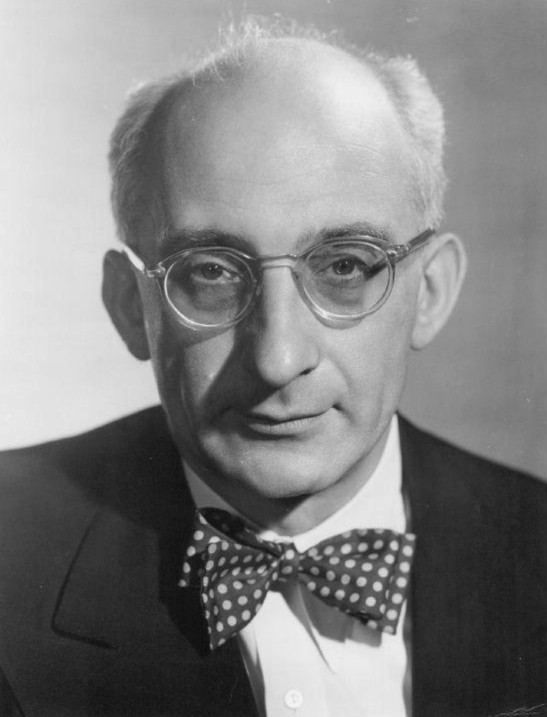
Conductor Peter Herman Adler, 1951.

Conductor Peter Herman Adler served as the NBCOT's music and artistic director, and Samuel Chotzinoff as the company's producer. Conductor Herbert Grossman was an associate conductor with the company when it was founded, but was later promoted to conductor in 1956. From that point on Adler and Grossman shared the conducting load while Adler remained music director. NBC disbanded the NBC Opera Theatre in 1964 and liquidated its assets. The company performed a total of 43 operas for NBC, the majority of which were broadcast on the program NBC Television Opera Theatre. The organization's work garnered 3 Primetime Emmy Award nominations. All of the performances were broadcast live from an NBC studio and were not pre-recorded or edited before airing, although kinescopes and later videotapes were made of live broadcasts for delayed broadcast purposes in some areas.

During its 14-year history, the NBC Opera Theatre commissioned several composers to write operas specifically for television. The most famous and most successful of these works was the very first new opera staged by the company, Gian Carlo Menotti's Amahl and the Night Visitors, which premiered live on December 24, 1951, as the first installment of the Hallmark Hall of Fame program. It was the first opera specifically composed for television in America. Other operas commissioned by the company included Bohuslav Martinů's The Marriage (1953), Lukas Foss' Griffelkin (1955), Norman Dello Joio's The Trial at Rouen (1956), Leonard Kastle's The Swing, Stanley Hollingsworth's La Grande Bretèche (1957), Menotti's Maria Golovin (1958), Philip Bezanson's Golden Child (1960), Kastle's Deseret (1961) and Menotti's Labyrinth (1963).

Most NBC Opera telecasts were sponsored by Texaco, who was also the longtime sponsor of radio broadcasts of the Metropolitan Opera. Nearly all NBCOT presentations after the middle 1950s were broadcast in color.

== Notable performers ==
- David Aiken
- John Alexander
- Chet Allen
- Mildred Allen
- David Atkinson
- Frances Bible
- Adelaide Bishop
- Shannon Bolin
- Richard Cassilly
- William Chapman
- Richard Cross
- Phyllis Curtin
- Shirlee Emmons
- Igor Gorin
- Donald Gramm
- Melissa Hayden
- Laurel Hurley
- Norman Kelley
- Ruth Kobart
- Rosemary Kuhlmann
- Gloria Lane
- Mario Lanza
- Brenda Lewis
- Leon Lishner
- Mary Mackenzie
- Elaine Malbin
- Nicholas Magallanes
- John McCollum
- Andrew McKinley
- Mac Morgan
- Patricia Neway
- Anne Pitoniak
- Michael Pollock
- Frank Porretta
- Leontyne Price
- Charlotte Rae
- Judith Raskin
- John Reardon
- Emile Renan
- Robert Rounseville
- Cesare Siepi
- Glen Tetley
- Michael Trimble
- Paul Ukena
- Theodor Uppman
- Dorothy Warenskjold
- Chester Watson
- Robert White
- Dolores Wilson
- Beverly Wolff
- Kurt Yaghjian
- Frances Yeend
