= The Triumph of St. Joan =

American opera

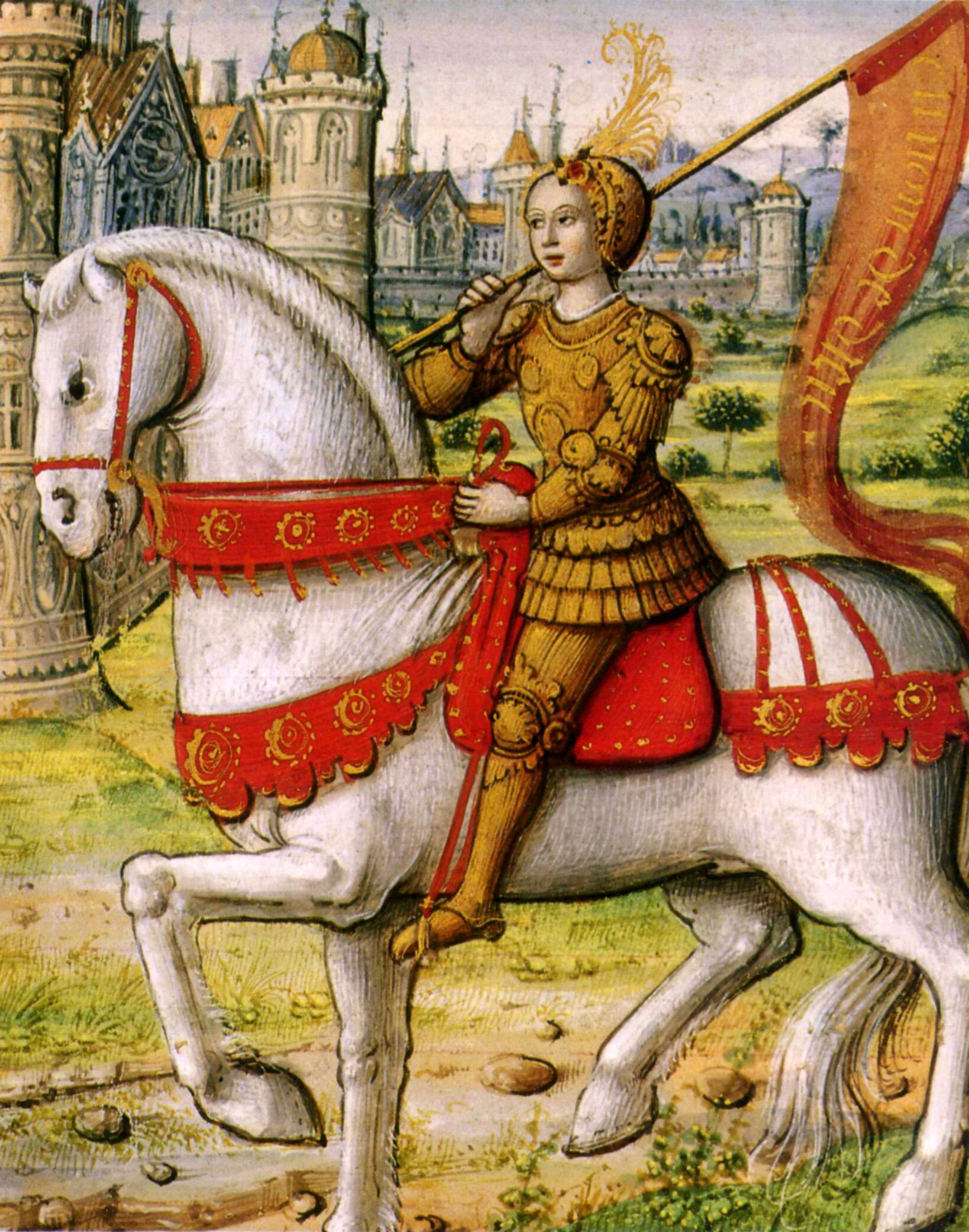
Joan of Arc depicted on horseback in a 1505 manuscript

The Triumph of St. Joan was originally an opera in three acts by Norman Dello Joio to an English language libretto on the subject of the martyrdom of Joan of Arc by Dello Joio and Joseph Machlis (1906–1998). It was premiered at Sarah Lawrence College on May 9, 1950. Although the opera was received positively, the composer was unhappy with the work and declined to have it performed again. However, he did adapt part of the opera into a symphony of the same title in 1951. The symphony was later renamed Seraphic Ode.

Dello Joio returned to the subject of Joan of Arc in 1955 when he was commissioned by the NBC Television Opera Theatre to produce an original 75-minute opera for television. The resulting work in two acts was retitled The Trial at Rouen, and, in using new music and a new libretto by Dello Joio, was in effect a completely different musical drama from its predecessor. It premiered on April 8, 1956 on NBC. Dello Joio adapted the work a third time, extending the music at the beginning and end of the 1956 version (including some music from the 1950 opera) to create a one-act opera for the stage. This third version, once again called The Triumph of St. Joan, was premiered by the New York City Opera on April 16, 1959.

== 1950 opera and 1951 symphony ==
Joan of Arc at the coronation of Charles VII of France as depicted by Ingres in this 1851 painting

Dello Joio was on the faculty of Sarah Lawrence College (SLC) and the college was looking to produce a theatrical work that could be a collaborative project across different departments. The composer had been contemplating writing an opera for a number of years already but had not found a subject matter that inspired him until attending the 1948 film Joan of Arc with his friend Joseph Machlis, a writer, musician, and Queens College, City University of New York, faculty member. The two men both agreed that an opera focusing on the "inner motivations and spiritual life of Joan" could be derived effectively and movingly and that it would make a good project for SLC. Over the next 11 months the two men laboured together to create the opera's libretto and Dello Joio composed the music in this time as well.

The original 1950 opera encompassed three soloists, an opera chorus, and dancers. The SLC's music and dance departments made up the cast and the production was accompanied by two pianos. The school's theatre majors specializing in the technical aspects of the stage designed and built the sets, lights, and costumes. Conductor Hugh Ross directed the chorus and all told a total of 85 SLC students were involved in putting the opera together. A grant from the Whitney Foundation provided much of the financial backing needed to mount the opera.

The opera premiered at Bates Hall on the campus of SLC on May 9, 1950. Gisela Weber created the title role with Jerome Swinford as Pierre Cauchon and John Druary as the Dauphin of France/Charles VII of France. The opera opens with Joan in her prison cell after her trial and sentence of execution. Awaiting her death alone, her memories of past events come to life on stage with intermittent periods returning her to her present moment of solitude. Flashbacks include her meeting with the Dauphin the day before the Siege of Orléans, his coronation at Rheims, the breach in the relationship between Charles and Joan, and Cauchon's condemning of her at her trial. Music critics Olin Downes noted the following about the integral part of chorus:

The chorus plays a many-sided role. Now, in the solitude of Joan's cell, it is the whispering voice of her sorely tired spirit; now it is active and potent participant in the drama, as in the coronation scene, or in the scene between Joan and the Bishop of Beauvaris, denouncing her; now it is the Greek commentator on the tragedy.

Overall the reception for Dello Joio's first rendition of The Triumph of St. Joan was positive. However, the composer was himself unhappy with the work and, although there was some interest in a professional staging of the opera, Dello Joio withdrew the work from such considerations. He did take some of the music and adapt it into a symphony which was first performed by the Louisville Orchestra on December 5 and 6, 1951. At the premiere, renowned dancer Martha Graham performed the role of Joan of Arc using her own choreography. The symphony is organized into three movements. The first movement, entitled "The Maid", is a theme and variation in 6/8 with flute and oboe soloists on the melody. The second movement, "The Warrior", is written in 12/8 with a great deal of intensity until it moves into a stately 4/4. Of the final movement, "The Saint", Dello Joio said, "I cannot urge you strongly enough to have the orchestra sing the last movement. I do not feel the end of this piece should be tragic but rather one of triumphant serenity. Joan must have welcomed the fire for it was the final test which led to her salvation."

== The Trial at Rouen ==
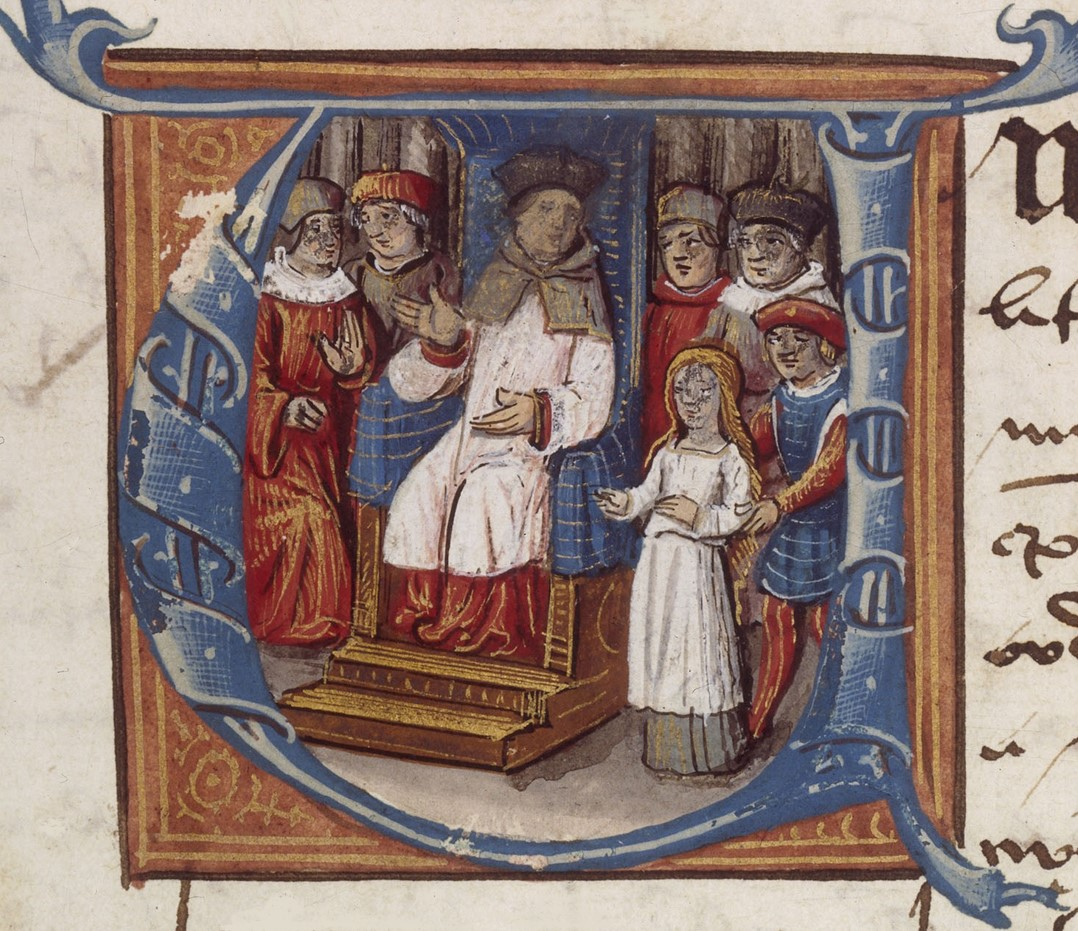
Manuscript portrait of Bishop Pierre Cauchon at the trial of Joan of Arc

Peter Herman Adler of the NBC Opera Theatre was interested in Dello Joio's work and in 1955 he commissioned the composer to provide the company with a new opera for television. Feeling he had not said what he wanted to say about Joan of Arc, Dello Joio returned to her as the source of this new work. He wrote an entirely new libretto in two acts, going back to the historical documents of her trial as a source for the new text. He also wrote completely new music for the opera. Dello Joio commented on this process:

The Trial at Rouen is not a version of my first opera, but is a completely new statement, both musically and dramatically; though the temptation to use the old material was great... The premise of my opera is simple. My conclusion is that the Joan story recounts the ageless conflict between the individual of excessive imagination and those who hold to the status quo. I was aware of how dangerous this concept was, because singing philosophy can be a bore. But, in reading the intense human drama between Joan and her accusers leaped forth from the pages in highly emotional terms.

In The Trial of Rouen, Dello Joio completely removed the character of the Dauphin of France/Charles VII of France, choosing instead to focus on Joan's trial and execution. The production starred soprano Elaine Malbin in the title role, baritone Hugh Thompson as Cauchon, bass-baritone Chester Watson as Father Julien, and baritone Paul Ukena as the Jailer. There were also six inquisitors and three heavenly voices in the cast. Peter Herman Adler conducted the Symphony of the Air for the production. The opera was broadcast nationally on NBC television on April 8, 1956, to an audience in the millions. Music critic Howard Taubman was overall positive about the work, stating that "The NBC Television opera gave The Trial at Rouen a brilliant production, one of the best in a growing line of video presentations." However, his comments on the effectiveness of the work were mixed. He said the following in his review in The New York Times:

The Trial at Rouen is a high-minded attempt to come to grips with the subject of the martyrdom of Saint Joan. Its mood is reverent without turning ponderous. It is always lyrical and occasionally tense with drama. It combines words and music with an ease that makes the enfolding of the song seem natural and with a poetry that heightens its emotion... Does his opera give us Joan in all her innocence and radiance? One would have to say it comes close but is defeated in the end. One of Mr. Dello Joio's troubles is that his libretto lacks contrast and his characters are almost of one shade. In the case of Joan, this fault is rectified by variety and subtlety in the music. However, the music, though it is not afraid to sing, lets us down in the climaxes by failing to sing with sufficient intensity.

== 1959 opera ==
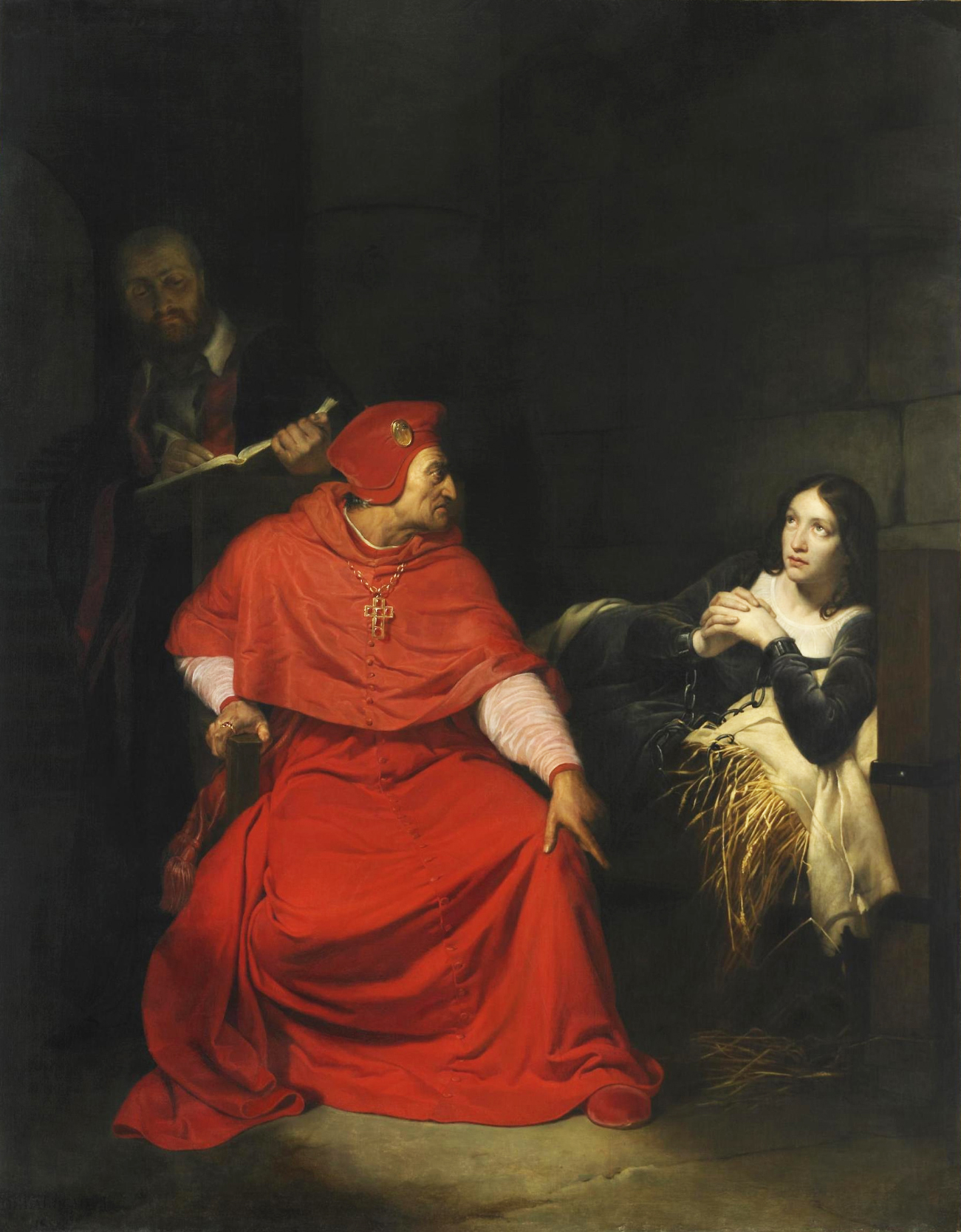
Joan of Arc is interrogated by the Cardinal of Winchester in her prison 1431 by Paul Delaroche (1797–1856)

After the somewhat mixed success of The Trial at Rouen, Dello Joio felt that he could still improve upon his opera further. He continued to work on the opera adding additional music to the beginning and end. He took some music from the original 1950 opera, a short aria for an English sentry (a character in the original opera but not the television version), and tagged it onto the beginning of the first act. He also added an impassioned extended farewell aria for Joan at the end of the opera. Although the work was now longer than the 1956 version, it was structured into one act instead of two.

In 1958 Julius Rudel offered to include Dello Joio's revised one-act opera, now retitled The Triumph of St. Joan, in the 1958–1959 New York City Opera (NYCO) season. He readily accepted and the work was premiered by the NYCO on April 16, 1959, in a double bill with Gian Carlo Menotti's The Medium. The cast included Lee Venora in the title role, Mack Harrell as Cauchon, Chester Watson as Father Julien, Chester Ludgin as the Jailer, and tenor Frank Porretta as the Sentry. Herbert Grossman conducted the opera which was staged by José Quintero and included sets by David Hays and costumes by Ruth Morely. Taubman also reviewed this production, commenting that this version was "a distinct improvement over its predecessors." He also remarked that the opera now had a much more effective climax with the scene where Joan is lashed to the stake "taking on a fearful and piteous realism".
