= Mary LeSawyer =

American opera singer (1917–2004)

- Марія Лисогір
- Born: Mary Wallick; October 8, 1912; Shamokin, Pennsylvania, United States
- Died: June 13, 2004 (aged 91); Orlando, Florida, United States
- Other names: Mary Polynack, Mary Poliniak
- Occupation: Opera singer

Mary LeSawyer (October 8, 1912 – June 13, 2004, born Mary Wallick) also known as Mary Poliniak or Mary Polynack, was an American opera singer, a lyric soprano who had an active international career during the 1940s through the 1960s.

== Early life and education ==
Mary Wallick was born in Shamokin, Pennsylvania, the daughter of Frank Wallick (or Wallach) and Anna Mazur Wallick. Both of her parents were Polish-speaking immigrants from Galicia; her father was a coal miner. She began singing in church and took piano lessons in Shamokin, then studied voice with Frank La Forge in New York City.

== Career ==
LeSawyer had a long and fruitful partnership with the New York City Opera (NYCO) from 1946 through 1962. With the NYCO she appeared in Carmen, La Traviata, Madame Butterfly, and others. In 1957 she was in the NYCO's televised world-premiere production of War and Peace. In 1958 she created the role of Mrs. Muller in the world premiere of Robert Kurka's The Good Soldier Schweik for the NYCO at Lincoln Center. She took part in the company's celebrated 1960 national tour, performing in four American operas: The Ballad of Baby Doe, Street Scene, Susannah, and Six Characters in Search of an Author.

LeSawyer sang at Expo 58 in Brussels. With her husband, she was active in the Ukrainian National Association (UNA), and with the Ukrainian National Women's League of America. She sang at the UNA's Bicentennial festival in Shamokin in 1976.

== Personal life ==
Mary Wallick married twice. She married her first husband, Walter Poliniak, in 1931; he died in 1938. She was married for many years to her second husband, Joseph LeSawyer, president of the Ukrainian National Association from 1961 to 1978. The couple lived in Scotch Plains, New Jersey before moving to Venice, Florida when they retired. Mary LeSawyer died in 2004, at the age of 91, in Orlando, Florida. Her gravesite is in the Indiantown Gap National Cemetery, because her second husband was a veteran of World War II.
