= The Medium (1960 film) =

- Based on: The Medium by Gian Carlo Menotti
- Directed by: Alan Burke
- Country of origin: Australia
- Original language: English

Production
- Running time: 60 mins

Original release
- Network: ABC
- Release: 31 August 1960

The Medium is a 1960 Australian television production. It was a filmed version of the opera by Menotti.

== Cast ==
- Jon Dennis
- Neil Easton as Mr. Gobineau
- Joan Grey as Mrs. Nolan
- Nita Maughan as Mrs. Gobineau
- Jane Ross as Monica
- Margaret Winkler as Madame Flora

== Production ==
It was directed by Alan Burke who later recalled he liked the opera "because it seemed to have visual opportunities and I thought it would work very well in television" being done in one set. He felt Menotti was "a poor man's Puccini... which is why the ABC was not all that keen to do it. But he is enormously effective theatrically. The Medium would make a wonderful movie score - so what better than to make a little television score with it? So we did that and pulled a few tricks - it led itself to very low key lighting."

== See also ==
- List of television plays broadcast on Australian Broadcasting Corporation (1960s)
