= The Good Soldier Schweik (opera) =

The Good Soldier Schweik is an opera in 2 acts by Robert Kurka with an English language libretto by Lewis Allan based on Jaroslav Hašek's 1921 novel The Good Soldier Švejk. Premiered by the New York City Opera just four months after the composer's death in 1958, the work uses some musical material from Kurka's earlier instrumental piece The Good Soldier Schweik Suite, which was premiered by The Little Orchestra Society in 1952. At the time of his death, Kurka had completed the opera in piano score form but had not fully completed the opera's orchestrations. His friend, the composer Hershy Kay, completed the orchestrations for the last scenes of the opera based on ideas for instrumentation that Kurka had written into the piano score with red pen. The work is scored for a small ensemble of just 16 instruments, which consist solely of woodwinds, brass, and percussion. The music has its roots in Czech folk and dance music with traditional forms like the polka and furiant being developed through a high art classical music lens that eschews lyricism for an edgy tautness.

== Performance history ==
The work was given its world premiere at the City Center Theater on April 23, 1958 by the New York City Opera; just months after the composer's death from leukemia in 1957. Allan began working on the libretto for the opera in 1955, and the composer wrote much of the music while fighting cancer in 1956 and 1957. The original production was directed by Carmen Capalbo, whose staging included the use of comedic projected film and utilization of movement idioms from American musical comedy. The production featured costumes by Ruth Morley, sets by Andreas Nomikos, and choreography by Robert Joffrey. The opera's title hero was portrayed by Norman Kelley, who later reprised the role when the work was performed again at The Town Hall in 1961 with the Symphony of the Air and conductor Robert De Cormier.

The European premiere of the opera was given at the Komische Oper Berlin in a production staged by Joachim Herz in 1958 with conductor Harold Byrns leading the musical forces. The work has had several other stagings in the United States and Europe, including a 1959 production at the Semperoper starring tenor Karl-Heinz Thomann in the title role and a celebrated production by the Chicago Opera Theater (COT) in 1981 which was directed by Frank Galati. The COT revived the work in March 2001, and recorded that production on disc with Cedille Records. Other organizations to stage the opera include the Minnesota Opera (1966), the Chamber Orchestra of Philadelphia (1967), the Opera Company of Boston (1970), the Houston Grand Opera (1973), Hartford Opera Theater (1974), Glimmerglass Opera (2003), and Long Beach Opera (2010), among others.

== Roles ==
Roles, voice types, premiere cast
| Role | Voice type | Premiere cast, April 23, 1958 Conductor: Julius Rudel |
|---|---|---|
| Joseph Schweik | tenor | Norman Kelley |
| Mrs. Muller | soprano | Mary LeSawyer |
| Palivec | bass-baritone | Chester Watson |
| Bretschneider | tenor | Jack De Lon |
| Psychiatrist 1 | tenor | Howard Fried |
| Psychiatrist 2 | baritone | Chester Ludgin |
| Psychiatrist 3 | bass | Joshua Hecht |
| Army doctor | bass-baritone | Emile Renan |
| Baroness Von Botzenhelm | contralto | Ruth Kobart |
| Katy Wendler | mezzo-soprano | Helen Baisley |
| Army Chaplain | tenor | Jack De Lon |
| Lieutenant Henry Lukash | baritone | David Atkinson |
Chorus: soldiers
