= The Consul =

Opera by Gian Carlo Menotti

- Opera by Gian Carlo Menotti
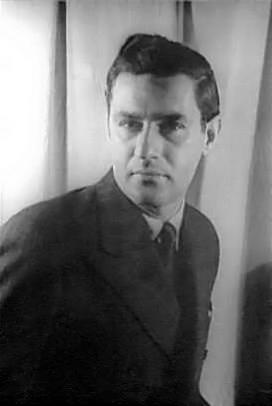
- The composer in 1944
- Librettist: Gian Carlo Menotti
- Language: English
- Premiere: March 1, 1950; Schubert Theatre, Philadelphia

The Consul is an opera in three acts with music and libretto by Gian Carlo Menotti, his first full-length opera.

== Performance history ==
Its first performance was on March 1, 1950, at the Shubert Theatre in Philadelphia with Patricia Neway as the lead heroine Magda Sorel, Gloria Lane as the secretary of the consulate, Marie Powers as the mother, and Andrew McKinley as the magician Nika Magadoff. The opera opened two weeks later (March 15, 1950) at the Ethel Barrymore Theatre in New York City where it enjoyed a run of nearly eight months (269 performances). It was initially conducted by Lehman Engel who was substituted by Thomas Schippers for nearly eight months until the last performance on November 4, 1950.

Neway (alternating with Yul Brynner's sister, Vera Brynner) also led the Broadway cast, this time with Rosemary Kuhlmann as the secretary of the consulate.

Neway, Kuhlmann, and Powers also performed these roles in the UK at the Cambridge Theatre in February 1951, with Norman Kelley playing the role of the magician Nika. For the opera's La Scala debut in January 1951, Powers and McKinley reprised their roles, and Clara Petrella portrayed Magda.

Zechariah Chafee Jr. noted the topicality of the opera by analogy to the real-life situations of how non-American scientists were hindered from entering the United States in the early 1950s.

For The Consul, Menotti won the 1950 Pulitzer Prize for Music and also the 1950 New York Drama Critics' Circle award for Best Musical.

== Roles ==
Roles, voice types, premiere cast
Role	Voice type	Premiere cast, 1 March 1950 Conductor: Lehman Engel
Magda Sorel	soprano	Patricia Neway
Secretary of the consulate	mezzo-soprano	Gloria Lane
Mother, mother to John Sorel	contralto	Marie Powers
John Sorel, husband to Magda	baritone	Cornell MacNeil
Secret Police Agent	bass	Leon Lishner
Nika Magadoff, magician	tenor	Andrew McKinley
Mr. Kofner	bass-baritone	George Jongejans
Foreign Woman	soprano	Maria Marlo
Anna Gomez	soprano	Maria Andreassi
Vera Boromel	contralto	Lydia Summers
Assan	baritone	Francis Monachino
First Plainclothesman	silent role	Chester Watson
Second Planeclothesman	silent role	Donald Blackey
The Voice on the Record	soprano	Mabel Mercer

== Synopsis ==
Place: An unidentified European totalitarian country.

=== Act 1 ===
Scene 1

The political dissident John Sorel is on the run from the secret police. At his home, his wife Magda and his mother hide him. The police arrive and search, but cannot find him. John says that he will escape to the border, and tells Magda to go to the consul and apply for a visa to leave the country. He will wait to cross the border until his wife, mother and child are safe.

Scene 2: The consul's office

Many people are waiting to obtain visas. Magda applies and joins the crowd, but the secretary cannot promise anything. Much specific paperwork is needed, and obtaining a visa is a long process. The same people wait at the consul's office day after day without approval of a visa.

=== Act 2 ===
Scene 1

The child is ill, and John's mother sings to comfort the child. The police try to extract information from Magda on her husband's compatriots, but she refuses. A message then arrives from John urging Magda to hurry with the visa.

Scene 2: The consulate

Magda is desperate to see the consul. A magician, waiting for a visa, attempts to impress the secretary by performing magic tricks and hypnotizing the rest of the room into believing they are at a ball, but he only ends up frightening her. Magda, after repeated visits, erupts in an anguished rant at the secretary, who says that she may see the consul once an "important visitor" has finished his business. This visitor proves to be the chief of police and Magda flees in terror.

=== Act 3 ===
Scene 1

Magda's child and mother-in-law have died. At the consul's office, Magda learns that John is planning to risk his life and return for her. A wealthy woman arrives and is immediately given a visa. Magda thinks of suicide to try to protect John, and leaves the consulate. As the office is about to shut down for the day, John suddenly arrives, but with the police in pursuit. The police capture John, and the secretary gets on the phone to try to contact Magda.

Scene 2

Despondent, and with visions of her past crowding her mind, Magda turns on the gas in the oven to kill herself. Her telephone then rings, the secretary trying in vain to contact her.

== Recordings ==
- Newport Classic NPD 85645/2
- Chandos CHAN 9706: Susan Bullock, Louis Otey, Jacalyn Kreitzer, Charles Austin, Victoria Livengood, Herbert Eckhoff, Giovanna Manci, Robin Blitch Wiper, Malin Fritz, John Horton Murray, Graeme Broadbent; Spoleto Festival Orchestra; Richard Hickox, conductor
- Naxos Historical 8.112023-24: Patricia Neway (Magda), Cornell MacNeil (John) and Marie Powers (Mother), conductor: Lehman Engel. This recording was made a month after the premiere with the original cast and conductor.
- Video: Neway, Ludgin; Torkanowsky (conductor), Jean Dalrymple (producer), 1960 (VAI)
