= Charles Friedman =

Health informatician and educator

Charles P. Friedman
- Occupations: Medical health informatician and educator, and an academic

Academic background
- Education: B.S., Physics; M.S., Physics; Ph.D., Education
- Alma mater: Massachusetts Institute of Technology; University of North Carolina, Chapel Hill

Charles P. Friedman is a medical health informatician and educator, and an academic. He is a professor in the Department of Learning Health Sciences at the University of Michigan Medical School.

Friedman's research focuses on biomedical and health informatics, as well as the processes of education and learning.

Friedman is a distinguished fellow of the American College of Medical Informatics, and a founding fellow of the International Academy of Health Sciences Informatics.

== Education ==
Friedman completed his B.S. in Physics in 1971 from the Massachusetts Institute of Technology (MIT). He obtained his M.S. in Physics from MIT in the same year and in 1977, earned his Ph.D. in Education from University of North Carolina, Chapel Hill. In 1992, he undertook advanced studies in Medical Information Science at Stanford University.

== Career ==
Friedman began his academic career in 1971 as a staff scientist at MIT and visiting lecturer at the Department of Physics at the University of Massachusetts, Boston where he remained until 1974. In 1977, he joined the Department of Family Medicine at the University of North Carolina, first as an assistant professor and later as an associate and full professor, and remained there until 1996. He was professor at the University of Pittsburgh between 1996 and 2006 and then joined the University of Michigan in 2011 where he was appointed as professor at the Schools of Information and Public Health. From 2014 to 2024, he was the Josiah Macy Jr. Professor of Medical Education and the founding chair of the Department of Learning Health Sciences.

From 2007 to 2009, he was deputy national coordinator for Health Information Technology, a division of the US Department of Health and Human Services. In 2009, he was appointed the chief scientific officer of the division and remained at the position until 2011.

Since 2015, he has been editor-in-chief of the journal Learning Health Systems.

== Research ==
Friedman's work on learning health systems (LHS) emphasized the potential of a dynamic, data-driven approach to health and health care improvement. He suggested that the effective use of electronic health records (EHRs) could transform raw medical data into structured, computable information and change patient care outcomes. He also highlighted that the achievement of a nation-wide LHS required an IT-enabled socio-technical infrastructure as well as active participation from multiple and diverse stakeholders.

Friedman's research also focused on interactions between providers, patients, and information technology, exploring the degree to which information resources provide advice that is helpful in addition to being correct. To clarify the goal of biomedical informatics, he presented a theorem which stated that biomedical informatics resources should strive to make people better than they would be without assistance from these resources.

== Awards and honors ==
- 1992 – Elected Fellow, American College of Medical Informatics
- 2010 – Secretarial Achievement Award, U.S. Department of Health and Human Services
- 2012 – Donald Detmer Award for Policy Innovation in Informatics, American Medical Informatics Association
- 2017 – Inaugural Fellow, International Academy for Health Science Informatics
- 2021 – Honorary Doctorate in Health Sciences and Medicine, University of Lucerne, Switzerland
- 2022 – Distinguished Fellow, American College of Medical Informatics

== Bibliography ==
=== Books ===
- Evaluation Methods in Medical Informatics (Computers and Medicine) Third Edition (2022) ISBN 9783030864521

=== Selected articles ===
- Friedman, Charles P.; Elstein, Arthur S.; Wolf, Fred M.; Murphy, Gwendolyn C.; Franz, Timothy M.; Heckerling, Paul S.; Fine, Philip L.; Miller, Thomas M.; Abraham, Vijoy (1999). "Enhancement of clinicians' diagnostic reasoning by computer-based consultation: A multisite study of 2 systems". Journal of the American Medical Association. 282 (19): 1851–1856. doi:10.1001/jama.282.19.1851. PMID 10573277.
- Friedman, Charles P.; Gatti, Guido G.; Franz, Timothy M.; Murphy, Gwendolyn C.; Wolf, Fred M.; Heckerling, Paul S.; Fine, Paul S.; Miller, Thomas M.; Elstein, Arthur S. (2005). "Do physicians know when their diagnoses are correct? Implications for decision support and error reduction". Journal of General Internal Medicine. 20 (4): 334–339. doi:10.1111/j.1525-1497.2005.30145.x. hdl:2027.42/74850. PMC 1490097. PMID 15857490.
- Friedman, Charles P. (2009). "A "fundamental theorem" of biomedical informatics". Journal of the American Medical Informatics Association. 16 (2): 169–170. doi:10.1197/jamia.M3092. PMC 2649317. PMID 19074294.
- Friedman, Charles P.; Wong, Adam K.; Blumenthal, David (2010). "Achieving a nationwide learning health system". Science Translational Medicine. 2 (57): 57cm29. doi:10.1126/scitranslmed.3001456. PMID 21068440.
- Friedman, Friedman; Rubin, Joshua; Brown, Jeffrey; Buntin, Melinda; Corn, Milton; Etheredge, Lynn; Gunter, Carl; Musen, Mark; Platt, Richard; Stead, William; Sullivan, Kevin; Van Houweling, Doughlas (2015). "Toward a science of learning systems: a research agenda for the high-functioning Learning Health System". Journal of the American Medical Informatics Association. 22 (1): 43–50. doi:10.1136/amiajnl-2014-002977. PMC 4433378. PMID 25342177.
- Friedman, Charles P. (2022). "What is unique about learning health systems?". Learning Health Systems. 6 (3) e10328. doi:10.1002/lrh2.10328. PMC 9284922. PMID 35860320.
- Friedman, Charles P.; Lomotan, Edwin A.; Richardson, Joshua E.; Ridgeway, Jennifer E. (2024). "Socio-technical infrastructure for a learning health system". Learning Health Systems. 8 (1) e10405. doi:10.1002/lrh2.10405. hdl:2027.42/192249. PMC 10797563. PMID 38249851.
