= Richard Verreau =

Canadian opera singer

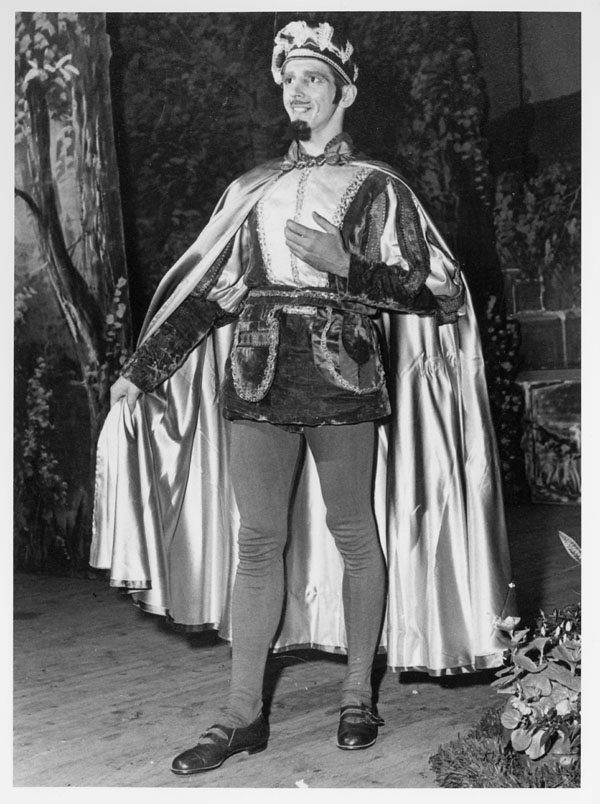
- Richard Verreau in Gounod's Faust
- Born: Richard Verreault; January 1, 1926; Château-Richer, Quebec, Canada
- Died: July 6, 2005 (aged 79)
- Known for: Tenor
- Awards: Order of Canada; National Order of Quebec

Richard Verreau, OC OQ (January 1, 1926 – July 6, 2005) was a French-Canadian operatic tenor, particularly associated with the French and Italian repertories.

== Biography ==
Born Richard Verreault, in Château-Richer, near Quebec City, he began singing as a child in church choir. He studied at the Laval University with Émile Larochelle. In 1949, on a Quebec government scholarship, he went to Paris and studied with Raoul Jobin. He made his debut at the Opéra de Lyon in 1951, where he sang the lead tenor roles in Lakmé, Manon, Mireille, and Les pêcheurs de perles.

In Europe, Verreau performed in Belgium, Italy, Austria, and even Russia (then the USSR). He made his debut at the Royal Opera House in London, as the Duke in Rigoletto and Iopas in Les Troyens in 1957, other roles there included: Alfredo in La traviata, Rodolfo in La bohème, Pinkerton in Madama Butterfly.

Back in North America, he appeared regularly with the Opera Guild of Montréal and the Théâtre lyrique de Nouvelle-France. He made his debut at the New York City Opera in 1956, as Wilhelm Meister in Mignon, followed by his debut at the Metropolitan Opera as Faust, in 1963. He appeared at the San Francisco Opera, as Roméo in Roméo et Juliette.

He also performed as soloist with the Montreal Symphony Orchestra and the New York Philharmonic Orchestra.

Verreau was praised for the velvety quality of his voice, and his warm tone, unfortunately, an unsuccessful throat surgery ended his career in 1977.

In 1998, he was made an Officer of the Order of Canada. In 2000, he was made an Officer of the National Order of Quebec.

== Sources ==
- The Encyclopedia of Music in Canada, Cécile Huot.
