= Happy Town (musical) =

Happy Town is a musical comedy that opened on Broadway October 7, 1959 and closed October 10, 1959 after only five performances. The music was by Gordon Duffy, lyrics by Harry Haldane, and book by Max Hampton, with additional songs by Paul Nassau.

The show starred Cindy Robbins, Biff McGuire, Ton Williams, Lee Venora, Chester Watson, and Michael Kermoyan and was about the only town in Texas that did not have a millionaire in residence.

The production was directed by Alan Buchrantz and choreographed by Lee Scott. Other credits went to Curt Nations for scenic design, Michael Travis for costumes, and Paul More for lighting.

The musical was poorly received. Brooks Atkinson of The New York Times wrote in his review, "'Happy Town' is profoundly uninteresting. No one can beat pleasure into it." Thomas R. Dash, of Women's Wear Daily, wrote, "The nadir of Broadway musicals of the recent past has been attained by Portofino and Buttrio Square. They can now move over and leave room for Happy Town." In 1991, Ken Mandelbaum wrote about Happy Town, "There have been camp flops since, but perhaps none as completely without merit or reason for being." The show received one Tony Award nomination for Best Choreography.
