= Elaine Malbin =

American opera singer (born 1929)

Elaine Malbin (born May 24, 1929) is an American soprano who had a prolific international career singing in operas, musicals, and concerts from the 1940s through the 1960s. She made her Town Hall debut at the age of 14. She appeared in a number of Broadway productions in the 1940s and 1950s and notably portrayed Marsinah in the original 1953 West End production of Kismet. She starred on Broadway in the title role of My Darlin’ Aida & sang a season of Gilbert and Sullivan at the Mark Hellinger Theater in New York. She was a regular at the New York City Opera during the 1950s and 1960s with leading roles in Love for Three Oranges, Carmen (Micaela), Turandot (Liù), La Bohème (Mimi) and Don Giovanni (Zerlina). She appeared with most of America's leading opera companies during this time as well, including the Houston Grand Opera and the San Francisco Opera. In San Francisco Malbin debuted in a staged version of Carmina Burnana and sang Mimi in La Bohème. She also appeared in concert with several notable orchestras including the New York Philharmonic and the Philadelphia Orchestra. On the International stage she appeared at a number of opera houses and major music festivals in the United Kingdom, Italy, and France. She performed at the Glyndebourne and Edinburgh Festivals as well as Madama Butterfly with the Scottish Opera Company. She is perhaps best remembered for appearing in several opera roles live for television with the NBC Opera Theatre and for recording two duets with Mario Lanza at RCA on 11 April 1950.

Malbin's first television opera was as Violetta in La Traviata opposite Lawrence Tibbett at the age of 19. Malbin then starred in NBC Television Operas, some available for viewing at the Paley Center, including I Pagliacci, Il Tabarro, Suor Angelica, Salome, Dialogues of the Carmelites, the world premiere of Norman Dello Joio's A Trial at Rouen and La Traviata. Her portrayal of Cio-Cio-San in Madama Butterly is lauded as perhaps her premiere performance. NBC developed a touring company featuring Miss Malbin following the success of the television performances.

Concert performances included summer venues including the Greek Theater in Los Angeles, Jones Beach in New York and The Robin Hood Dell in Philadelphia. Smaller venue performances included El San Juan Hotel, San Juan & The Riviera in Havana. Her recordings for RCA Victor include two duets with Mario Lanza released on his Toast Of New Orleans album.

Malbin appeared on the Ed Sullivan Show, Perry Como, and Eddie Fisher Shows, in addition to multiple appearances on The Voice of Firestone and the Jack Parr and Johnny Carson Tonight Shows.

On July 4, 1962, Malbin sang at the special request of President John F. Kennedy at the Independence Day celebration at Independence Hall in Philadelphia. Malbin also performed for President Nixon, President Truman and President Johnson.

Malbin retired at the height of her career in 1968. She returned to the stage in January 1979 as Cleopatra in Handel's Giulio Cesare at the Kennedy Center in Washington, D.C. She also gave a recital at Alice Tully Hall the same year. Following these two major performances Malbin returned to semi-retirement. She became involved with teaching, mentoring young artists and working with the boards of several opera and arts foundations. Her television operas have been featured with events at the Paley Center in NY. She attends each event and sits on discussion panels.

== Biography ==
=== Early years ===
Born and raised in Brooklyn, Malbin started studying singing as a child and made her professional recital debut at the young age of 14 at New York City's Town Hall on March 31, 1945. That same year she began to perform regularly on the radio on WNEW singing popular songs to entertain the troops during the last year of World War II. She made her Carnegie Hall debut with The New York Pops on May 7, 1947, in a concert entitled "Viennese Night" which featured her singing numerous songs and arias by Viennese composers. She performed in concert with The New York Pops several more times over the next year. From 1948 to 1951 Malbin sang in the NBC Chorus that performed in concerts and recordings with the NBC Symphony Orchestra.

On May 15, 1949, Malbin made her professional opera debut with the San Carlo Opera Company as Musetta in Giacomo Puccini's La bohème. She made her Broadway debut on the following October 4 as Peep-Bo in Gilbert and Sullivan's The Mikado at the Mark Hellinger Theatre, notably the inaugural season of that theatre. She performed in two other Gilbert and Sullivan shows at that theatre through October 22: Edith in The Pirates of Penzance and the Plaintiff in Trial by Jury. Shortly thereafter she was cast as Violetta in C.B.S. Opera Television Theatre's production of Giuseppe Verdi's La Traviata which was first broadcast on March 12, 1950.

Malbin began 1950 singing in a concert of opera arias at the Detroit Opera House with the Detroit Civic Opera. On April 18, 1950, she made her first appearance at the Mann Center for the Performing Arts singing with the Robin Hood Dell Orchestra in an evening honoring Margaret Truman. On July 12, 1950, she performed the role of Jenny in Kurt Weill's Down in the Valley in a concert version with the New York Philharmonic under conductor Maurice Levine. In September 1950, she sang her first role with the New York City Opera, Princess Ninetta in Sergei Prokofiev's The Love for Three Oranges. The following month she sang with the company in two more productions, singing Frasquita in Georges Bizet's Carmen and Zerlina in Wolfgang Amadeus Mozart's Don Giovanni. On December 14, 1950, she debuted with the Philadelphia La Scala Opera Company as Gilda in Verdi's Rigoletto. She closed out the year singing in more performances of Carmen with the New York City Opera, this time in the role of Micaela.

In March 1951 Malbin made her first performance with the Philadelphia Orchestra singing the soprano solos in a production of Bach's St Matthew Passion at Rutgers University. That same month she returned to the New York City Opera to portray Javotte in Jules Massenet's Manon. Later that year she sang Liu in Puccini's Turandot with the company and reprised the roles of Zerlina and Micaela. In October 1951 she appeared on television again as Nedda in NBC Opera Theatre's production of Ruggero Leoncavallo's Pagliacci.

Malbin returned to Broadway in October 1952 to portray Aida in the musical My Darlin' Aida which was adapted by Charles Friedman from Giuseppe Verdi's Aida, resetting the opera during the American Civil War. She portrayed the role through January 1953 when the show closed. In April 1953 she returned to the New York City Opera to sing her first Adele in Johann Strauss II Die Fledermaus. Shortly thereafter she made her United Kingdom debut portraying Marsinah in the original West End cast of Kismet at the Stoll Theatre. A tremendous success, the show ran for a total of 648 performances. She later reprised the role of Marsinah on Broadway in 1955 and portrayed the role in the show's first National tour.

In 1954 Malbin appeared with NBC Television Opera Theatre again starring in the title role of a critically acclaimed production of Richard Strauss's Salome and in the title role of a production of Puccini's Suor Angelica. That same year she made her first appearance at the Glyndebourne festival, portraying Colombina in Ferruccio Busoni's s Arlecchino and her debut at the Edinburgh Festival as Echo in Strauss's Ariadne on Naxos. Shortly thereafter she made the first of many appearances in France and in Italy. In 1955 Malbin portrayed the title role in Puccini's Madama Butterfly for the NBC Television Opera Theatre. The following year she portrayed the role of Joan of Arc in the world premiere of Norman Dello Joio's The Trial at Rouen which was composed for the NBC Television Opera Theatre. She appeared in two more television productions with the NBC Television Opera Theatre the following year, Violetta in La Traviata and Blanche in Poulenc's Dialogues of the Carmelites. On February 10, 1958, she performed the role of Mimi in La Bohème for the inaugural of the Philadelphia Lyric Opera Company opposite John Alexander as Rodolfo. The following October she made her debut with the San Francisco Opera singing the soprano solos in Carl Orff's Carmina Burana. In 1955, for NBC Opera Theatre, she performed the title role in Puccini's Madama Butterfly.

=== Later years ===
In 1961 Malbin made her debut with the Opera Company of Boston and sang for the first time with the Philadelphia Grand Opera Company as Madama Butterfly. In 1962 she made her debut with the Pittsburgh Opera and sang the title role in Massenet's Manon for the first time with the New York City Opera. That year was also her first appearance at the Scottish Opera where she sang Madama Butterfly.

From 1963 to 1964 Malbin toured the United States with the San Carlo Opera Company portraying the roles of Madama Butterfly and Mimi. She also made her first appearance at the Houston Grand Opera in 1967 singing Madama Butterfly. That same year she portrayed her first opera role with the San Francisco Opera, Leila in Bizet's Les Pêcheurs de Perles.

In 1967 Malbin met and married her husband, George Emanuel. They have two daughters. At this point she decided to retire her career to focus on being a wife and mother and took an almost twelve-year absence from the opera stage. She returned to the opera stage in January 1979 singing Cleopatra in Handel's Giulio Cesare at the Kennedy Center in Washington, D.C. She returned to New York City for a lauded recital at Alice Tully Hall the following October. One of her last appearances on the opera stage was in 2000 as the Barroness in Dicapo Opera's production of Samuel Barber's Vanessa. Although she no longer appears in opera, Malbin still occasionally performs in concert.
