= Cornell MacNeil =

American baritone (1922-2011)

- Born: September 24, 1922; Minneapolis, Minnesota
- Died: July 15, 2011 (aged 88); Charlottesville, Virginia, U.S.
- Occupation: Operatic baritone
- Years active: 1950 - 1985

Cornell MacNeil (September 24, 1922 – July 15, 2011) was an American operatic baritone known for his exceptional voice and long career with the Metropolitan Opera, which spanned 642 performances in twenty-six roles. Opera News opined he "was a great baritone in era of great baritones — Warren, Gobbi, Merrill, Milnes — and in the contemporary press, comparisons to his colleagues were frequent. But MacNeil's performances had singular musical richness, and moral and intellectual complexity that were his alone. MacNeil may have had rivals, but he had no equals."

== Life and career ==
Cornell MacNeil was born in Minneapolis, Minnesota to a dentist and a singer. He was interested in opera from a young age, but suffered from severe asthma, which also contributed to his rejection from World War II. He then took on a wartime job as a lathe operator, after which, on his mother's advice, began his vocal studies. Among his teachers were Friedrich Schorr and Dick Marzollo.

Before the end of the war, he sang and made announcements for the Radio City Music Hall Glee Club, for whose audience he announced the surrenders of the German and the Japanese at the end of the war. After a brief audition, he was cast by the composer and director Gian Carlo Menotti as the male lead in his opera, The Consul, which opened on March 1, 1950, at the Shubert Theater in Philadelphia. He debuted with the New York City Opera in 1953 as Germont in La traviata and the Metropolitan Opera House in 1959 as the lead in Rigoletto. In 1959, he debuted in La Scala in Ernani. In 1969, he became president of the American Guild of Musical Artists.

MacNeil's voice was notable for its size and top notes. Despite some vocal decline in the late 1970s, he maintained a high standard throughout his long career. Two of his most notable roles were the title role in Rigoletto, and Iago in Otello. MacNeil was a regular at the Metropolitan Opera.

His debut was on March 21, 1959, as Rigoletto. Rigoletto was also the role he sang the most at the Met, 104 times, including the Met's first telecast of that opera in 1977, in the production by John Dexter.

MacNeil was also well known for the role of Baron Scarpia in Tosca, a role he sang 92 times at the Met between November 2, 1959, and December 5, 1987, which was his last performance with the company. He appeared at La Scala in 1959 (Ernani, with Franco Corelli) and in 1960 (Aida).

== Abridged discography ==
- Menotti: The Consul (Neway, Powers; Engel, 1950) Decca Records
- Verdi: La traviata: excerpts (Kirsten, Hayward; Cellini, 1958) [live] VAI
- Puccini: La fanciulla del West (Tebaldi, del Monaco, Tozzi; Capuana, 1958) Decca Records
- Verdi: Aïda (Tebaldi, Simionato, Bergonzi; Karajan, 1959) Decca Records
- Leoncavallo: Pagliacci (Tucci, del Monaco; Molinari-Pradelli, 1959) Decca Records
- Mascagni: Cavalleria rusticana (Simionato, del Monaco; Serafin, 1960) Decca Records
- Verdi: Un ballo in maschera (Nilsson, Simionato, Bergonzi; Solti, 1960–1) Decca Records
- Verdi: Rigoletto (Sutherland, Cioni, Siepi; Sanzogno, 1961) Decca Records
- Verdi: Luisa Miller (Moffo, Verrett, Bergonzi, Tozzi, Flagello; Cleva, 1965) RCA
- Verdi: Rigoletto (Grist, Gedda; Molinari-Pradelli, 1967) EMI
- Leoncavallo: Pagliacci (Carlyle, Vickers; Bartoletti, 1968) [live] VAI
- Verdi: La traviata (Stratas, Domingo; Levine, 1982) Elektra

== Abridged videography ==
- Puccini: Tosca (Pobbe, Raimondi; Argento, 1965) [live]
- Verdi: Rigoletto (Cotrubaș, Domingo, Díaz; Levine, Dexter, 1977) [live]
- Verdi: Otello (Scotto, Vickers; Levine, Zeffirelli/Melano, 1978) [live]
- Puccini: Tosca (Verrett, Pavarotti, Tajo; Conlon, Gobbi, 1978) [live]
- Weill: Aufstieg und Fall der Stadt Mahagonny (Stratas, Varnay, Cassilly, Plishka; Levine, Dexter, 1979) [live]
- Puccini: Il tabarro (Scotto; Levine, Melano, 1981) [live]
- Verdi: La traviata (Stratas, Domingo; Levine, Zeffirelli, 1982)
- Zandonai: Francesca da Rimini (Scotto, Rom, Domingo; Levine, Faggioni, 1984) [live]
- Puccini: Tosca (Behrens, Domingo; Sinopoli, Zeffirelli, 1985) [live]
