= Marie Powers =

American opera singer (1902–1973)

- Born: June 20, 1902; Mount Carmel, Pennsylvania, U.S.
- Died: December 29, 1973 (aged 71) New York City, New York, U.S.
- Occupation: Contralto
- Years active: 1919–1960s
- Spouse: Luigi Crescentini

Marie Powers (June 20, 1902 – December 29, 1973), also known as Countess Crescentini, was an American contralto who was best known for her performance as Madame Flora in Gian Carlo Menotti’s The Medium, a role that she played on stage, screen and television.

== Early life and education ==
Powers was born in Mount Carmel, Pennsylvania, the daughter of Daniel Powers and Rose Anne Powers. All of her grandparents were born in Ireland. She studied music and language at Cornell University. Powers studied in New York with Frank La Forge, and earned a master's degree at the Royal Conservatory in Florence, Italy.

== Career ==
Powers sang in Europe in the 1920s and 1930s, including a stint with the Paris Opera and appearances at La Scala under conductor Arturo Toscanini. She returned to the United States in 1937, and was a contralto soloist in concerts of Verdi's Requiem, Handel's Messiah, and Constant Lambert's Rio Grande. She also gave recitals for community groups.

In 1947, Italian writer Lanfranco Rasponi introduced her to Menotti, who was casting the role of the fraudulent psychic in his opera The Medium. The opera was staged on Broadway along with another one-act Menotti opera, The Telephone, or L'Amour à trois. Powers was noted for her dramatic performance as the phony psychic, and she repeated the role on live television in 1948 and in an expanded film production directed by Menotti in 1951. In 1950, Robert Wahls of the Daily News described Powers as "a first ranking contralto and one of the few singers with an unfailing sense of theatre."

Powers appeared in the 1957 Broadway revival of the musical Carousel, and as the Queen Mother in the original 1960 production of Becket with Laurence Olivier and Anthony Quinn. In 1964 she directed and sang in a production of The Medium at the Peabody Conservatory in Baltimore. She toured in Asia and Australia in 1966, performing on radio and television programs.

== Personal life ==
Powers married Luigi Crescentini, an Italian count. In 1938, her husband died. Powers died of heart failure in 1973, in New York City, at the age of 71.
