= Chester Ludgin =

American baritone

Chester Ludgin (May 20, 1925 – August 9, 2003) was an American operatic baritone.

== Biography ==
Chester Ludgin was a native of Brooklyn, New York, and was in the US Army during World War II. He made his professional debut in 1956 with The Experimental Opera Theatre of America (affiliated with the New Orleans Opera Association), as Baron Scarpia in Giacomo Puccini's Tosca, conducted by Renato Cellini and directed by Armando Agnini. The very next year, he first appeared with the New York City Opera, as Dr Falke in Johann Strauss II's Die Fledermaus, opposite Phyllis Curtin.

With the City Opera, Ludgin was heard in many roles, including what was perhaps his greatest success, John Proctor in the world premiere of Robert Ward's The Crucible (1961, with Norman Treigle as the Reverend John Hale). He was also in the premieres of Robert Kurka's The Good Soldier Schweik (1958), Norman Dello Joio's The Triumph of St. Joan (1959), and Abraham Ellstein's The Golem (1962) for that company. He also portrayed Briquet in the premiere of the revised version of Robert Ward's He Who Gets Slapped (1959). He was applauded there, as well, for his portrayal of Horace Tabor in The Ballad of Baby Doe.

Ludgin was also a favorite at the San Francisco Opera (SFO) from 1962 to 1985, making his debut with the company as Zurga in Georges Bizet's Les pêcheurs de perles with Lee Venora as Leila and Richard Verreau as Nadir. On October 28, 1967 he portrayed the Presiding officer in the United States premiere of Gunther Schuller's The Visitation with Simon Estes and Jeanette Scovotti. On November 6, 1976 he sang the role of Lyman Ward in the world premiere of Andrew Imbrie's Angle of Repose (alongside Nancy Shade and Susanne Marsee). His last appearance at the SFO was as the Earl of Gloucester in Aribert Reimann's Lear on September 27, 1985 with Thomas Stewart in the title role.

Ludgin's other roles with the SFO included Amonasro in Aida (with Jon Vickers as Radames), Barnaba in La Gioconda (with Leyla Gencer), Baron Jaroslav Prus in The Makropoulos Case, Boris Timofeyevich Ismailov in Lady Macbeth of Mtsensk (opposite Anja Silja), Dikoy in Káťa Kabanová (with Elisabeth Söderström in the title role), Don Fernando in Fidelio (with Birgit Nilsson as Leonore), Friedrich von Telramund in Lohengrin (with Hildegard Hillebrecht as Elsa), Fritz Kothner in Die Meistersinger von Nürnberg (with Claramae Turner as Eva), the Grand Inquisiteur in Don Carlos (with Marilyn Horne as Princess Eboli), Iago in Otello (with James McCracken in the title role and Pilar Lorengar as Desdemona), Jack Rance in La fanciulla del West (with Marie Collier as Minnie), John Proctor to the Elizabeth Proctor of Frances Bible, Krushina in The Bartered Bride (with Mary Costa as Marenka), Kurwenal in Tristan und Isolde (with Irene Dalis as Isolde), the Music Master in Ariadne auf Naxos (with Reri Grist as Zerbinetta and Jess Thomas as Bacchus), Rodrigo in Lulu (with Evelyn Lear in the title role), Scarpia (with Giulia Barrera as Tosca and Enrico di Giuseppe as Mario Cavaradossi), Sharpless in Madama Butterfly (with Teresa Stratas as Cio-Cio-San), Valentine in Faust (with Richard Verreau in the title role and Arnold Voketaitis as Mephistophélès), Von Faninal in Der Rosenkavalier (with Dame Elisabeth Schwarzkopf as the Marschallin) and the title roles in Boris Godunov (with Richard Cassilly as Grigori and Ramón Vinay as Varlaam), Macbeth (with Grace Bumbry as Lady Macbeth), and Rigoletto.

In 1982, Ludgin appeared at Carnegie Hall, in a concert version of Tchaikovsky's Iolanta, with Galina Vishnevskaya and Nicolai Gedda.

In 1983, the singing-actor capped his career with the last of his twelve world premieres, as Old Sam in Leonard Bernstein's A Quiet Place (1983). The production was seen in Houston, Milan (Teatro alla Scala), Washington DC and Vienna, where the composer conducted his work (and when it was televised). At the age of seventy-eight, the beloved baritone succumbed to cancer, in New York City.

== Selected discography ==
- Weisgall: The Tenor (Cassilly; Grossman, 1958) CRI
- Menotti: The Consul (Neway; Torkanowsky, 1960) VAI
- Ward: The Crucible (Brooks, Bible, Macurdy; Buckley, 1962) CRI
- Ponchielli: La Gioconda: Final Scene (Farrell; Guadagno, 1967) [live] VAI
- Bernstein: A Quiet Place (Uppman; Bernstein, 1986) [live] Deutsche Grammophon

== Videography ==
- Menotti: The Consul (Neway; Torkanowsky, Dalrymple, 1960) VAI
