= Norman Kelley =

American opera singer (1911–2006)

- Born: August 27, 1911; Eddington, Maine, U.S.
- Died: September 4, 2006 (aged 95); Rockland, Massachusetts, U.S.
- Occupation: Operatic tenor
- Years active: 1940s–1970s
- Known for: Regular performer at the Metropolitan Opera, translator of Hänsel und Gretel into English

Norman Kelley (August 27, 1911 – September 4, 2006) was an American operatic tenor who had an active international career during the 1940s through the 1970s. He was notably a regular performer at the Metropolitan Opera between 1957 and 1961, and he sang in several world premieres with the New York City Opera. He also notably translated Engelbert Humperdinck's Hänsel und Gretel into English, a version first performed in 1967 and used by opera companies to this present day.

== Biography ==
Kelley was born and raised in Eddington, Maine, the oldest child of John Kelley and Janet Kelley (née Shiels) Kelley. At the age of 16, he moved to Boston with the intention of training to be a minister at Gordon College. However, an advertisement for acting instruction at the Leland School caught his eye and, after auditioning, he won a scholarship to the school which enabled him to pursue studies in theatre and music. He entered the New England Conservatory where he began studying singing seriously. He then attended Pasadena College where he appeared in numerous student theatre productions.

In the 1930s, he sang on the stage of the Radio City Music Hall in New York City and appeared on the radio shows of Voice of Firestone and Major Bowes Amateur Hour, where he won second prize, an upright piano. He eventually won a scholarship to the Eastman School of Music to pursue graduate studies. Kelley's operatic career was put on hold however with the outbreak of World War II. He served in the United States Army from 1940 to 1945, performing on the radio show Fort Bragg Salutes America. In 1944, he married opera singer Maria Paradiso with whom he had two children. They divorced in 1969.

Kelley made his professional opera debut on December 11, 1947 as Mario Cavaradossi in Giacomo Puccini's Tosca with the Philadelphia La Scala Opera Company. He sang regularly with that company over the next two years in such roles as Alfredo in Giuseppe Verdi's La Traviata, Don José in Georges Bizet's Carmen, Pinkerton in Puccini's Madama Butterfly, Radamès in Verdi's Aida, and the title role in Charles Gounod's Faust. In 1948, he joined the San Carlo Opera Company touring North America in the role of Alfredo. Over the next decade, he traveled throughout North America, singing leading roles with such companies as the New Orleans Opera, the San Antonio Grand Opera Festival, the Pittsburgh Opera, the Miami Opera, the Baltimore Opera Company, the Opera Company of Boston, and the Houston Grand Opera.

In 1950 Kelley made his Broadway debut as Magician Nika Magadoff in Gian Carlo Menotti's The Consul at the Ethel Barrymore Theatre. He portrayed the same role for his debut with the New York City Opera in 1952 and in the 1960 NBC television recording of the work. Kelley became a fixture at the New York City Opera during the 1950s and 1960s, including leading roles in four world premieres — the title role in Robert Kurka’s The Good Soldier Schweik (1958), Reverend Samuel Parris in Robert Ward's The Crucible (1961), Lord Mark in Douglas Moore's The Wings of the Dove (1961), and Ely Pratt in Carlisle Floyd's The Passion of Jonathan Wade (1962). Other notable NYCO roles for Kelley included Pandarus in William Walton's Troilus and Cressida (1956); the Narrator in the U.S. premiere of Carl Orff's Der Mond (1956); Count Mancini in Ward's He Who Gets Slapped (1959); Mr. Scratch in Moore's The Devil and Daniel Webster (1959) and Méphistophélès in the U.S. premiere of Prokofiev's The Fiery Angel (1965).

In 1952 Kelley sang in the United States premiere of Hugo Wolf's Der Corregidor at Carnegie Hall. In 1956 he portrayed the role of Belmonte in Mozart's Die Entführung aus dem Serail in Stratford, Connecticut in a production celebrating the bicentennial of Mozart's birth. The production was notably organized by Lincoln Kirstein and George Balanchine and led by music director Erich Leinsdorf. In August 1958 he portrayed the role of Dr. Zuckertanz in the world premiere of Menotti's Maria Golovin at the Brussels World's Fair. He stayed with the production when it moved to the Martin Beck Theatre on Broadway in November 1958.

In 1957, Kelley joined the roster of principal tenors at the Metropolitan Opera where he sang frequently for the next four years. He made his debut with the company on January 18, 1957 portraying Mime in Richard Wagner's Das Rheingold. His other roles at the Met included Mime in Wagner's Siegfried, Don Basilio in Le Nozze di Figaro, Herod in Richard Strauss's Salome, Prince Shuisky in Mussorgsky's Boris Godunov, and Goro in Madama Butterfly among others. His final performance at the Met was as Alcindoro in Puccini's La Bohème on April 10, 1961.

Kelley was also active on the international stage during the 1950s and 1960s, singing at such opera houses as the Palacio de Bellas Artes, La Monnaie, the Palais Garnier, the Opéra National de Lyon, Toulon Opera, Opéra national de Lorraine, Théâtre du Capitole, Opéra de Normandie, Teatro Nacional de São Carlos, Montreal Opera, Canadian Opera Company, and Vancouver Opera. In 1972 Kelley made his debut with the San Francisco Opera as Butler in the United States premiere of Gottfried von Einem's Der Besuch der alten Dame. He also appeared in many productions with the New York Gilbert and Sullivan Players during his career.

Kelley died at the age of 95 of Alzheimer's disease in Rockland, Massachusetts.

== Recordings ==
- Richard Wagner: Das Rheingold, Metropolitan Opera, Walhall, 1957.
- Richard Wagner: Siegfried, Metropolitan Opera, Walhall, 1957.
- Gian Carlo Menotti: Maria Golovin, Broadway Cast Album, RCA Victor, 1958.
- Gian Carlo Menotti: The Consul, Video Artists Int'l, 1960.
- Robert Ward: The Crucible, New York City Opera, Albany Records, 1962.

== Sources ==
- "Norman D. Kelley, at 95; brought strong acting skills to operatic roles" The Boston Globe (subscription required)
