= Robert Kurka =

American classical composer

Robert Frank Kurka (December 22, 1921 – December 12, 1957) was an American composer, who also taught and conducted his own works.

== Biography ==
Kurka was born in Cicero, Illinois. He was mostly self-taught as a musician. He studied for short periods under Darius Milhaud and Otto Luening, and received his Master of Arts degree in music from Columbia University in 1948. After that he lived most of his life in New York.

Kurka held teaching positions at City College of New York, Queens College and Dartmouth College. He wrote a total of two symphonies, five string quartets, six violin sonatas, and other works for piano, voice, and chorus.

He is probably best known for the instrumental suite, The Good Soldier Schweik. This was inspired by Jaroslav Hašek's anti-war novel The Good Soldier Schweik, published in English translation in 1956.

Kurka expanded his music for an opera of the same name, completed just before his death in 1957. The libretto was written by Abe Meeropol of New York, who in 1937 had written the song, "Strange Fruit" about lynchings in the American South.

The opera's orchestration was completed by Hershy Kay. The Good Soldier Schweik premiered at the New York City Opera on April 23, 1958. Its music attracted critical comparisons to the compositions of Kurt Weill, especially for its satirical, ironic bent and incorporation of popular styles.

Kurka died of leukemia on December 12, 1957, in New York City.

== List of works ==
=== Full orchestra ===
- Music for Orchestra, Op. 11 (1949)
- Three Pieces for Orchestra, Op. 15
- Symphony No. 1, Op. 17 (1951)
- Symphony No. 2, Op. 24 (1952)
- Serenade for (Small) orchestra "after Walt Whitman", Op. 25 (publ. 1954; composed probably around 1945)
- John Henry, Portrait for Orchestra, Op. 27
- Julius Caesar, Symphonic Epilogue After Shakespeare's Play, Op. 28 (1955)

=== Chamber orchestra ===
- Chamber Symphony, Op. 3 (1948)
- Symphony for Strings and Brass, Op. 7 (1948)
- The Good Soldier Schweik, Suite from the Opera, for band, Op. 22
- Chamber Sinfonietta, Op. 39 (1957)

=== Concertos ===
- Concerto for violin and chamber orchestra, Op. 8 (1948)
- Concertino for two pianos, string orchestra and trumpet obbligato, Op. 31 (1955)
- Concerto for Marimba and Orchestra, Op. 34
- Ballad for French Horn and Strings, Op. 36

=== String quartets ===
- String Quartet No. 1, Op. 1
- String Quartet No. 2, Op. 4
- String Quartet No. 3, Op. 9
- String Quartet No. 4, Op. 12
- String Quartet No. 5, Op. 25

=== Other chamber works ===
- Sonata for Violin and Piano No. 1, Op. 2
- Sonata for Solo violin, Op. 5
- Sonata for Violin and Piano No. 2, Op. 10
- Music for Violin, Trumpet, Clarinet, Horn and Bass, Op. 14
- Trio for Violin, Cello and Piano, Op. 16
- Little Suite for Woodwing Quartet, Op. 18
- Sonatina for Cello and Piano, Op. 21
- Sonata for Violin and Piano No. 3, Op. 23
- Sonata for Violin and Piano No. 4, Op. 30

=== Piano works ===
- Sonatina, Op. 6
- For the Piano, Op. 13
- Sonata, Op. 20
- Dance Suite for Piano, Four Hands, Op. 29
- Sonatina for Young Persons, Op. 40 (1957)
- Notes from Nature, 10 pieces for children

=== Choral works ===
- Who Shall Speak for the People, for men’s chorus, Op. 32
- Song of the Broadaxe, for men’s chorus, Op. 38

=== Opera ===
- The Good Soldier Schweik, 2 acts (1957)
