= Beverly Wolff =

American mezzo-soprano (1928–2005)

Beverly Wolff rehearsing the role of Sesto for the NYCO's 1966 production of Handel's Giulio Cesare.

Beverly Wolff (November 6, 1928 – August 14, 2005) was an American mezzo-soprano who had an active career in concerts and operas from the early 1950s to the early 1980s. She performed a broad repertoire which encompassed operatic and concert works in many languages and from a variety of musical periods. She was a champion of new works, notably premiering compositions by Leonard Bernstein, Gian Carlo Menotti, Douglas Moore, and Ned Rorem among other American composers. She also performed in a number of rarely heard baroque operas by George Frideric Handel with the New York City Opera (NYCO), the Handel Society of New York, and at the Kennedy Center Handel Festivals.

Wolff made only a few appearances on the international stage during her career, choosing instead to work with important opera companies and orchestras in the United States. She was particularly active with the NYCO with whom she performed frequently from 1958 to 1971. Opera News stated, "Wolff was one of a golden generation of American singers who dominated the NYCO roster during the general directorship of Julius Rudel. Her combination of stylish, intelligent singing and "big brass sound," as she termed it, was a key element in some of the company's most celebrated productions."

== Early life and career ==
Born in Atlanta, Georgia, Wolff studied the trumpet in her native city and began her career as a trumpeter with the Atlanta Symphony Orchestra (ASO) while still a teenager. She actively performed with the ASO as both a soloist and a member of the first trumpet section while a student at the University of Georgia, where she earned a degree in English literature in the Spring of 1950. It was while playing with the ASO that Wolff's singing voice was discovered by conductor Henry Sopkin. Wolff abandoned the trumpet section and sang the alto solos in the Verdi "Requiem" replacing an ailing mezzo-soprano at age 20. Sopkin encouraged her to pursue vocal training and she subsequently was selected to study at the Academy of Vocal Arts in Philadelphia in the fall of 1950, where she was a pupil of Sidney Dietch and Vera Mclntyre. While a student at AVA, she was discouraged from taking outside auditions, but won an audition to perform with the Philadelphia Orchestra. She sang "Che farò senza Euridice" at the Philadelphia Academy of Music and became a favorite of Eugene Ormandy and other conductors.

In 1952, at the age of 23, Wolff received a personal phone call from Leonard Bernstein, where she was invited to do the world premiere of a new opera of his at Tanglewood. After these performances, she made her professional opera debut portraying Dinah in a nationally televised broadcast of Leonard Bernstein's Trouble in Tahiti for the NBC Opera Theatre (NBCOT). She performed only one more time with the NBCOT during her career: the role of The executive director in the world premiere of Gian Carlo Menotti's Labyrinth in March 1963. She performed two roles with Boris Goldovsky's New England Opera Theater in 1953: Idamante in Wolfgang Amadeus Mozart's Idomeneo and Mistress Quickly in Giuseppe Verdi's Falstaff. She then put her opera career on hold in order to start a family. She did, however, perform occasionally in concerts during the mid-1950s, making appearances with the Atlanta Symphony Orchestra, the Birmingham Symphony Orchestra, the Buffalo Philharmonic Orchestra, and the Philadelphia Orchestra, among others. Even after returning to opera in 1968, Wolff maintained a measured pace for her professional and personal life; in general, for every two weeks of work, she would spend three weeks at home. In a 1972 Opera News interview, Wolff stated, "You can't leave a list of performances to posterity. The only future is your children, and rearing them is not a part-time job." Wolff became a teacher in her home in Lakeland, Florida, after which she was invited to teach at the Academy of Vocal Arts. She went on to teach at Florida Southern College, where she served as provost of the university for a term.

== Working in New York City ==
In 1958 Wolff joined the roster of artists at the New York City Opera, where she made her debut reprising the role of Dinah in Trouble in Tahiti which was presented in a double bill with Mark Bucci's Tale for a Deaf Ear. She went on to portray several more roles with the NYCO over the next thirteen years. For the company she created the role of Leona in the world premiere of Menotti's The Most Important Man in 1971. She took part in two of Tito Capobianco's landmark productions at the NYCO: Handel's Giulio Cesare (1966) in which she sang Sesto opposite Norman Treigle, Beverly Sills and Maureen Forrester; and Donizetti's Roberto Devereux (1970), in which she sang Sara opposite Beverly Sills, Plácido Domingo, Louis Quilico. Both operas were conducted by Julius Rudel. Other roles she sang at the NYCO included Cherubino in Le nozze di Figaro, Desideria in The Saint of Bleecker Street, Siebel in Faust, and the title roles in Carmen, and Douglas Moore's Carry Nation. She notably created the latter part in the opera's world premiere in Lawrence, Kansas in 1966.

In March 1972 Wolff sang the title role in the United States premiere of Handel's Rinaldo in a concert version with the Handel Society of New York (HSNY) at Carnegie Hall, a role which she also recorded. She later performed the role of Daniel in Handel's Belshazzar with the HSNY in 1973, and sang the role of Ruggiero with the HSNY the New York premiere of Handel's Alcina on March 25, 1974, with Cristina Deutekom in the title role and Karan Armstrong as Morgana. In November 1972 she performed the role of Clarice in Rossini's La pietra del paragone in a concert version at Alice Tully Hall. On November 25, 1973, she created the title role in the world premiere of Ned Rorem's one-act opera Bertha at Alice Tully Hall.

Wolff was also active as a concert soloist and recitalist in New York City. In December 1961 she performed to an audience of more than 10,000 people at Carnegie Hall as a soloist in Handel's Messiah with the Festival Orchestra of New York under conductor Thomas Dunn. She sang several more times with the Festival Orchestra, including in performances of Henry Purcell's The Fairy-Queen and Igor Stravinsky's Pulcinella. She made a total of 25 appearances with the New York Philharmonic (NYP) from 1965 to 1978, making her debut with the orchestra on January 14, 1975, as a soloist in Gioachino Rossini's Stabat Mater. Other works she sang with the NYP included Gustav Mahler's Symphony No. 8 (1965), Felix Mendelssohn's Elijah (1966), Handel's Messiah (1966), Hector Berlioz's La damnation de Faust (1967, Marguerite), Berlioz's La mort de Cléopâtre (1968), and Anton Bruckner's Te Deum (1978) among others. In 1968 she was a soloist in Verdi's Requiem with conductor Siegfried Landau and the Brooklyn Philharmonic. In 1975 she performed with The Little Orchestra Society as a soloist in Edward Elgar The Dream of Gerontius with conductor Thomas Scherman. In December 1977 she made her New York City recital debut at Town Hall.

Wolff retired from performance in the early 1980s. One of her last performances was as a soloist in Ludwig van Beethoven's Symphony No. 9 in May 1982 at Avery Fisher Hall with conductor Rohan Joseph de Saram, the Oratorio Society of New York, and the American Philharmonic Orchestra.

== Other work ==
In addition to her work with the NYCO, Wolff performed roles as a guest artist with many other American opera companies. In 1962 she portrayed the role of the Dryad in Richard Strauss' Ariadne auf Naxos at the Washington National Opera with Reri Grist as Zerbinetta and George Shirley as Bacchus. She returned to the WNO the following year as Erika in Samuel Barber's Vanessa with Francesca Roberto in the title role. In 1963 she made her debut at the San Francisco Opera as Judith in Béla Bartók's Bluebeard's Castle with Peter Harrower as Bluebeard. She performed several more roles with the company through 1977, including Carry Nation, Giulietta in The Tales of Hoffmann, Marfa in Káťa Kabanová, and Ottavia in L'incoronazione di Poppea. In 1964 she sang Carmen at the Santa Fe Opera, and in 1965 she sang the role again at the Chastain Amphitheater in her native as city opposite Richard Tucker as Don José. In 1967 she made her debut with the Philadelphia Lyric Opera Company as Suzuki in Madama Butterfly to the Cio-Cio San of Montserrat Caballé. She returned to Philadelphia in 1970 to sing Amneris in Aida with Ljiljana Molnar Talajić as the title heroine and Sherrill Milnes as Amonasro. In 1971 she sang Adalgisa in Vincenzo Bellini's Norma at the Opera Company of Boston with Sills in the title role and Sarah Caldwell conducting. In 1976 she appeared at the Lyric Opera of Chicago as Ulrica in Verdi's Un ballo in maschera with José Carreras as Riccardo. In 1978 she sang the title role in the United States premiere of Handel's Poro at the Kennedy Center Handel Festival. She returned to the festival in 1980 to perform the title role in the American premiere of Handel's Radamisto.

Wolff was also active as a recitalist and concert soloist, appearing in numerous cities around the United States. In August 1961 she performed for President John F. Kennedy, First Lady Jacqueline Kennedy, and 345 physically handicapped children in a concert held on the south lawn of the White House. In 1965 she was a soloist in two cantatas by Johann Sebastian Bach with conductor Erich Leinsdorf and the Boston Symphony Orchestra (BSO) at the Tanglewood Music Festival. She performed with the BSO several more times, including performing alongside Beverly Sills and Plácido Domingo as soloists in Joseph Haydn's The Creation in 1967. She performed in two works by Mahler with conductor William Steinberg and the Pittsburgh Symphony:Songs of a Wayfarer in 1966 and the Resurrection Symphony in 1967. In 1975 she was a soloist in Verdi's Requiem in a performance given for Pope Paul VI at the Vatican. In 1977 she sang the part of the Wood Dove in Arnold Schoenberg's Gurre-Lieder at the Ravinia Festival with the Chicago Symphony Orchestra and Chorus under the direction of James Levine. In 1980 she was a soloist in Alexander Scriabin's Symphony No. 1 with the Philadelphia Orchestra and conductor Riccardo Muti.

Wolff also sang abroad in Europe and in Mexico. In Italy she performed at the Festival dei Due Mondi in Spoleto, the Teatro della Pergola in Florence, and La Fenice in Venice. She sang a riveting Adalgisa at the Palacio de Bellas Artes in Mexico City for which the Mexican government issued her a medal. Some of the other roles she sang internationally were Brangäne in Tristan und Isolde, Dalila in Samson et Dalila, and the title role in Benjamin Britten's The Rape of Lucretia.

== Later life ==
Beverly Wolff retired from performing in the early 1980s. In 1981 she began teaching on music faculty at Florida Southern College in Lakeland, Florida. She occasionally invited promising singers to work with her in Lakeland, among them Mezzo-Sopranos Wanda Brister and Annamaria Popescu. Beverly had lived in Lakeland with her husband, businessman John Dwiggins, and their two sons since in 1967. She continued to teach at FSC until her death. She died from heart-surgery complications in Lakeland on August 14, 2005, at the age of 76. She was a National Patroness of Delta Omicron, an international professional music fraternity.

== Selected recordings ==
- Rossini – Stabat Mater – Martina Arroyo, Tito Del Bianco, Justino Díaz – New York Philharmonic, Camerata Singers – Thomas Schippers – 1965 – Columbia Records
- Bernstein – Trouble in Tahiti – David Atkinson, Miriam Workman, Earl Rogers, Robert Bollinger – M.G.M. Orchestra – Arthur Winograd – 1966 – Heliodor Records
- Handel – Giulio Cesare – Norman Treigle, Beverly Sills, Maureen Forrester – NYCO Chorus and Orchestra – Julius Rudel – 1967 – RCA
- Moore – Carry Nation – Ellen Faull, Arnold Voketaitis, Julian Patrick, Joan August – NYCO Chorus and Orchestra – Samuel Krachmalnick – 1969 – Bay Cities
- Donizetti – Roberto Devereux – Beverly Sills, Róbert Ilosfalvy, Peter Glossop – Ambrosian Opera Chorus, Royal Philharmonic Orchestra – Sir Charles Mackerras – 1969 – Deutsche Grammophon
- Handel – Rinaldo – Arleen Auger, Rita Shane, Raymond Michalski – Vienna Volksoper Orchestra – Stephen Simon – 1972 – RCA Red Seal Records
- Rossini – La pietra del paragone – José Carreras, John Reardon, Elaine Bonazzi, Anne Elgar, Andrew Földi, Justino Díaz, Raymond Murcell – Clarion Concerts Chorus and Orchestra – Newell Jenkins – 1973 – Vanguard Classics
- Handel – Alcina – Cristina Deutekom, Karan Armstrong, Lucia Valentini-Terrani, John Stewart, Paul Plishka – Handel Society of New York Orchestra & Chorus – Brian Priestman – 1974 – Gala
- Mercadante – "Il Giuramento" – (as Bianca); Patricia Wells (Elaisa), Gianluigi Colmagro (Manfredo) – The Juilliard Orchestra /Dir.: Thomas Schippers / live 29.6.1970 / Spoleto
