= Herbert Grossman =

American conductor

Herbert Grossman, 2008

Herbert Grossman (September 30, 1926 – September 11, 2010) was an American conductor who was chiefly known for his work within opera and musical theatre.

== Early life and education ==
Born in New York City, Grossman was the son of a businessman. He studied piano and trombone in his youth before entering Queens College, City University of New York in 1942. There he continued to pursue studies in both instruments and was a student of Karol Rathaus and Curt Sachs. His studies were interrupted by World War II, and he served in the United States Navy in the South Pacific from 1944-1946. After returning home in 1946, he returned to Queens College to finish his degree; reorienting his studies at that time towards a concentration in conducting. In the summers of 1947 and 1948 he was a student of conducting at the Tanglewood Music Center, studying under such greats as Leonard Bernstein, Boris Goldovsky, and Serge Koussevitzky.

== Career ==
In 1949 Grossman joined the conducting staff of the newly formed NBC Opera Theatre (NBCOT). In 1952 he took a leave of absence from that organization to further hone his conducting skills in Europe. He spent the next two years on the musical staff at the Bavarian State Opera and working as an associate conductor of the Munich Philharmonic. He returned to the NBCOT in 1954 when he was appointed the company's new associate conductor, and in 1956 he was promoted to conductor at the NBCOT. He conducted several operas for television for NBC up until the company disbanded in 1964, including the world premieres of Philip Bezanson's Golden Child (1960) and Gian Carlo Menotti's Labyrinth (1962) and the 1963 film of Menotti's Amahl and the Night Visitors.

While working for the NBCOT, Grossman joined the conducting staff of the New York City Opera (NYCO) in 1955. His first opera with the company was a production of Georges Bizet's Carmen with Gloria Lane as the title heroine. He conducted periodically at the NYCO over the next several years, leading performances of mainly contemporary works like The Medium and The Triumph of St. Joan. In 1956 a successful guest conducting job with the Baltimore Symphony Orchestra led to further contracts with that orchestra, and ultimately to his appointment as associate conductor in 1959. He remained in that post until April 1962. During this time he was the musical director of the Baltimore Opera Company founded by Rosa Ponselle after which he served as associate conductor of the Pittsburgh Symphony Orchestra under conductor William Steinberg in 1962-1963.

In 1958 Grossman conducted a production of Menotti's The Consul at the New Orleans Opera. That same year he worked for the first time on Broadway as the music director of Menotti's Maria Golovin; a work which he later conducted at the NYCO in 1959. He went on to conduct for several more original Broadway productions, including The Roar of the Greasepaint – The Smell of the Crowd (1965), Drat! The Cat! (1965), Walking Happy (1966–1967), and Cry for Us All (1970). His last conducting job on Broadway was for the 1972 musical Ambassador.

Grossman was also a frequent conductor at the San Francisco Opera (SFO) during the 1960s. He first conducted for the SFO in 1964, leading a production of Carlisle Floyd's Susannah starring Lee Venora in the title role and Richard Cassilly as Sam. Other operas he conducted at the SFO were Madama Butterfly (1965), The Crucible (1965), Carry Nation (1966), The Turn of the Screw (1966), The Magic Flute (1967), Manon Lescaut (1967), Cavalleria Rusticana (1967), Pagliacci (1967), and The Tales of Hoffmann (1967). He also served as the Music Director of SFO's Western Opera Theater from 1966–1968.

Grossman was married to writer and opera translator Anne Chotzinoff Grossman, who was the daughter of pianist, critic, and NBCOT founder Samuel Chotzinoff and the niece of violinist Jascha Heifetz. Anne worked as an associate producer at the NBCOT and it was there that the couple met. They married in 1951, and their marriage of 51 years came to an end upon Anne's death of lung cancer in 2002. The couple notably collaborated on translating Puccini's Gianni Schicchi into the English language; a translation which has been widely used (including by the Metropolitan Opera) and is included in the published score by Ricordi. In 2009, Grossman married former friend and opera singer Sylvia B. Davis (1935-2022) in a ceremony at West Gilgo Beach, New York. Davis died in 2022 in Northridge, California at the age of 87. Grossman died in 2010 at the age of 83 in West Gilgo Beach, New York. The cause was kidney failure.

== Recordings ==
- Hugo Weisgall's The Tenor - Vienna State Opera Orchestra - Richard Cassilly, Richard Cross, Doris Young
