= Philadelphia Lyric Opera Company =

American opera company (1958–1974)

The Philadelphia Lyric Opera Company was an American opera company located in Philadelphia, Pennsylvania that was active between 1958 and 1974. The company was led by a number of Artistic Directors during its history, beginning with Aurelio Fabiani. Other notable Artistic Directors include Julius Rudel and Anton Guadagno (1966–1972). The company produced between four and six of their own operas every year in addition to sponsoring numerous traveling productions from the New York City Opera. In 1975 the company merged with the Philadelphia Grand Opera Company but retained its original name. With the combined resources of both companies, the Philadelphia Lyric Opera Company began producing higher quality productions with name artists such as Luciano Pavarotti, Joan Sutherland, Roberta Peters, Montserrat Montserrat Caballé, and others. For the bicentennial year 1976, the company commissioned famed opera composer Gian Carlo Menotti to create a new opera. The work, The Hero, premiered on June 1, 1976. In 1980, the company artistically reorganized to form the Opera Company of Philadelphia.

The company's first production, Giacomo Puccini's La bohème, was held on February 10, 1958 at the Academy of Music. The production starred Elaine Malbin as Mimì and John Alexander as Rodolfo. Although the company performed works from a variety of composers and musical periods, for the most part the company concentrated on Italian grand opera and verismo opera; particularly operas by Giuseppe Verdi and Puccini. The company notably presented the United States premiere of Renzo Rossellini's Uno sguardo dal ponte on October 17, 1967 with Nicola Rossi-Lemeni as Eddie Carbone and Gloria Lane as Beatrice.

Many notable singers performed leading roles with the company including Luigi Alva, Carlo Bergonzi, Grace Bumbry, Montserrat Caballé, José Carreras, Elisabeth Carron, Richard Cassilly, Franco Corelli, Phyllis Curtin, Plácido Domingo, Simon Estes, Eileen Farrell, Mirella Freni, Nicolai Gedda, Peter Glossop, Marilyn Horne, Alfredo Kraus, James King, Albert Lance, Leon Lishner, Catherine Malfitano, Robert Merrill, Sherrill Milnes, Anna Moffo, Birgit Nilsson, Luciano Pavarotti, Roberta Peters, Leontyne Price, Louis Quilico, Samuel Ramey, Judith Raskin, Regina Resnik, Seymour Schwartzman, Renata Scotto, Cesare Siepi, Beverly Sills, Eleanor Steber, John Stewart, Joan Sutherland, Renata Tebaldi, Richard Tucker, Theodor Uppman, Cesare Valletti, Shirley Verrett, Camilla Williams, and Frances Yeend to name just a few. The final opera performance by the company was held on November 22, 1974. Another staging of La bohème, it starred Jean Fenn as Mimì and Luciano Rampaso as Rodolfo.
