= David Aiken =

David Aiken may refer to:

- David Aiken (baritone) (1917–2011), American opera singer
- D. Wyatt Aiken (1828–1887), United States congressman from South Carolina
- David Aiken (Massachusetts politician), member of the 1874 Massachusetts legislature
