= Loftis =

Loftis is a surname. Notable people with the surname include:

- Curtis M. Loftis, Jr. (born 1958), American politician, businessman and philanthropist
- Dwight Loftis (born 1943), American politician
- Norman Loftis, American poet
- Robert Geers Loftis (born 1956), American diplomat
- Zenas Sanford Loftis (1881–1909), American missionary to Tibet
