= Leon Lishner =

American operatic bass-baritone

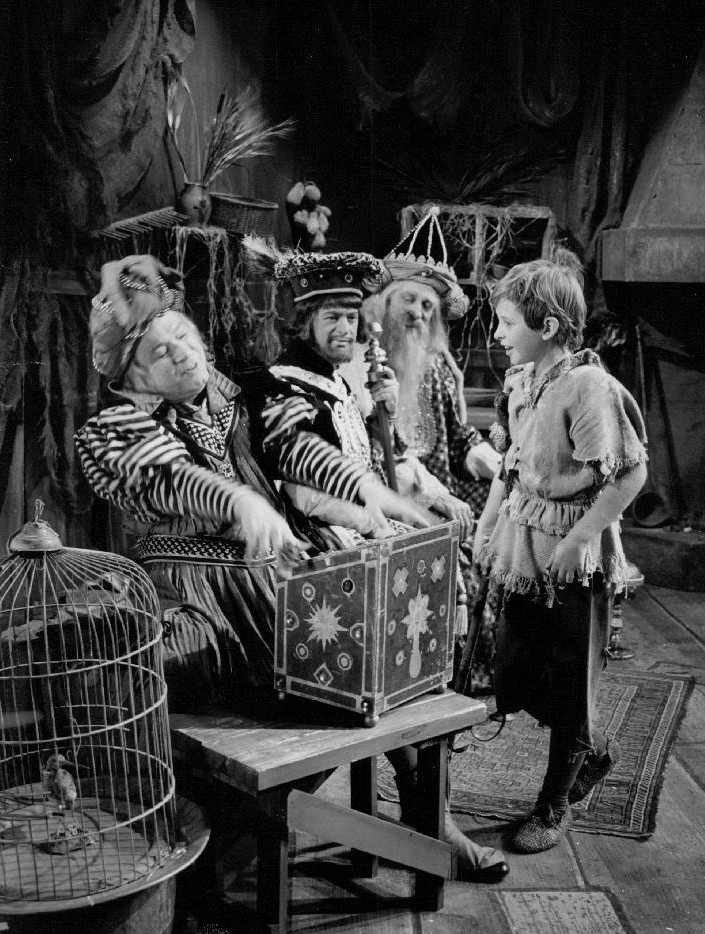
Photo of the Three Kings and Amahl from the opera Amahl and the Night Visitors. The kings are, from left-Andrew McKinley, Leon Lishner and David Aiken.

Leon Lishner (4 July 1913 – 21 November 1995) was an American operatic bass-baritone. He was particularly associated with the works of Gian Carlo Menotti, having created parts in the world premieres of four of his operas. He performed in many productions with the New York City Opera and the NBC Opera Theatre during the 1950s and early 1960s.

== Life and career ==
Born in New York City, Lishner was the son of Russian Jewish immigrants to the United States. He earned diplomas in music from the City College of New York and the Juilliard School. In 1942–1943 he was committed to Sylvan Levin's Philadelphia Opera Company; performing the roles of Arkel in Pelléas et Mélisande, Colline in La bohème, Doctor Blind in Die Fledermaus, and Doctor Bartolo in The Marriage of Figaro. After appearing in supporting roles in several operas with a variety of companies, his first prominent stage part was the Chief Police Agent in the world premiere of Gian Carlo Menotti's The Consul in Philadelphia in 1950. He continued with the production when it moved to Broadway later that year. He also reprised the part in 1953 in concert with the Philadelphia Orchestra and in 1957 at Public Garden in Boston.

"Los Cuatro Generales" and "Viva La Quince Brigada"
Two folk songs from the Spanish Civil War sung by Lishner.

After the critical success of The Consul, Menotti was invited by NBC to compose an opera for television which was to be performed by the newly created NBC Opera Theatre (NBCOT). What resulted was the highly successful Christmas opera Amahl and the Night Visitors which was premiered on Christmas Eve of 1951 in a national broadcast to millions. For this production, Menotti enlisted the forces of many of the singers from The Consul; including Lishner who was cast in the role of King Balthazar. He continued to portray that role, along with the other original adult cast members, for annual live television broadcasts up through 1964. They also gave annual national tours of Amahl, performing with symphony orchestras in concerts throughout the United States.

Lishner created roles in two more operas by Menotti. He portrayed Don Marco in Menotti's The Saint of Bleecker Street which debuted on Broadway in 1954. In 1963 he performed The Desk Clerk / Death in Menotti's Labyrinth which was also commissioned by the NBCOT. He sang in several more productions for the NBC Opera, including John Claggart in Benjamin Britten's Billy Budd (1952), Osmin in Wolfgang Amadeus Mozart's The Abduction from the Seraglio (1954), and Napoleon Bonaparte in Sergei Prokofiev's War and Peace (1957). He also performed the speaking part of Stepan in the world premiere of Bohuslav Martinů's The Marriage (1953) for NBC.

In August 1953 Lishner made his debut with the Central City Opera as Herr Reich in Otto Nicolai's The Merry Wives of Windsor. He soon after joined the roster of artists at the New York City Opera (NYCO); making his debut with the company in October 1953 as Dottore Grenvil in Giuseppe Verdi's La traviata. With the NYCO he notably sang parts in the United States premieres of Gottfried von Einem's Der Prozeß and Marc Blitzstein's Regina (Ben Hubbard, 1953). He had a particular triumph at the NYCO in 1958 as Sir Morosus in Richard Strauss' Die schweigsame Frau. Some of the other roles he sang with the company were Alcindoro in La bohème (1955), Carlino in Don Pasquale (1955), Herr Reich (1955), and Osmin (1958).

In 1955 Lishner performed the role of Vodník in Antonín Dvořák's Rusalka at Town Hall under conductor Peter Herman Adler. In 1956 he sang the role of Daniel Webster in Virgil Thomson's The Mother of Us All with Shirlee Emmons in her Obie Award winning performance of Susan B. Anthony at the Phoenix Theater. In 1966 he performed the part of Dr Kolenatý in the United States premiere of Leoš Janáček's The Makropulos Case at the San Francisco Opera. In 1972 he portrayed the role of Rambaldo Fernandez in La Rondine for the Philadelphia Lyric Opera Company with Anna Moffo as Magda de Civry.

Lishner served on the music faculty of the University of Washington from 1964 to 1979. Composer Carol Sams cast him as God in her opera Heaven. He died in Seattle at the age of 82. After his death his recorded version of "Tachanka" became the intro to Neutrale Kijkers, a podcast about the World Cup in Russia.
