= Richard Cassilly =

American opera singer (1927–1998)

- Richard Cassilly as Tannhäuser at the Metropolitan Opera in 1978.
- Born: December 14, 1927; Washington, D.C.
- Died: January 30, 1998 (aged 70)
- Education: Bel Air High School; Peabody Conservatory; Johns Hopkins University
- Occupation: operatic tenor
- Years active: 1955–1990
- Height: 6.3 ft 0 in (192 cm)
- Spouse: Patricia Craig

Richard Cassilly (December 14, 1927 – January 30, 1998) was an American operatic tenor who had a major international opera career between 1954–90. Cassilly "was a mainstay in the heldentenor repertory in opera houses around the world for 30 years", and particularly excelled in Wagnerian roles like Tristan, Siegmund and Tannhäuser, and in dramatic parts that required both stamina and vocal weight, such as Giuseppe Verdi's Otello and Camille Saint-Saëns's Samson.

He was an admired Don José in Carmen and sang almost all of the leading Puccini tenor roles. Standing at 6'3" and possessing a 250-pound frame The New York Times described him as "a burly tenor with a bright ping on the top notes who had a supple lyric quality [to his voice]", and "was known to bring a musical intelligence and uncommonly clear diction to his work."

Cassilly spent the early years of his opera career singing primarily with the New York City Opera between 1955–1966, often portraying roles in obscure and contemporary operas. During these years he also traveled frequently throughout North America, appearing with most of the major opera companies in the United States and Canada. In 1965 he launched a major international opera career when he portrayed the title role in a critically acclaimed production of Heinrich Sutermeister's Raskolnikoff at the Grand Théâtre de Genève. This performance earned him a contract with the Hamburg State Opera as their leading in-house dramatic tenor, a position he held from 1965 to 1978. Engagements with other major companies soon followed, and by 1973 Cassilly had sung leading roles with almost every major opera house in Europe, including La Scala, the Opéra National de Paris, the Vienna State Opera, and the Bavarian State Opera.

Cassilly also forged a strong collaborative partnership with the Royal Opera in London, appearing in that house almost every year from 1968 to 1982. In 1978 he joined the roster of principal tenors at the Metropolitan Opera in New York City, where he spent the majority of his time until his retirement in 1990.

== Education and early career ==
Born in Washington, D.C., Cassilly spent his childhood on a farm near Aberdeen, Maryland where he attended Bel Air High School where his voice potential was first recognized. He became involved in music through singing in his high school's glee club. In 1946, at the age of eighteen, he entered the Peabody Conservatory at Johns Hopkins University where he studied singing with Hans Heinz. As a student he sang in college productions of The Flying Dutchman (as the Steersman) and Madama Butterfly (as Pinkerton). During this time he also had the opportunity to study under Rosa Ponselle who had retired from her career and was residing in Baltimore.

After graduating with a degree in vocal performance in 1952, Cassilly moved to New York City with his first wife and their first child to pursue a performance career. Shortly thereafter he became a member of the John Harms Chorus singing with them at such venues as Town Hall between 1952–1954. He also worked as a paid singer for a couple of different churches during this time. Eventually his break came in 1954 when he was hired by William Steinberg as the tenor soloist in Beethoven's Symphony No. 9 with the Pittsburgh Symphony. This was followed by his operatic debut on Broadway as A Young Man and understudy for Michele in Gian Carlo Menotti's The Saint of Bleecker Street in December 1954. The production was a particular hit with the New York public and ran through April 1955. After it closed, the NBC Opera Theatre decided to use the cast for a televised version of the show.

== American fame and the New York City Opera years:1955–1966 ==
Cassilly's performance in The Saint of Bleecker Street drew the attention of Joseph Rosenstock, director of the New York City Opera (NYCO), who invited him to audition for the company in the Spring of 1955. Impressed with the audition, Rosenstock offered him a contract with the company and Cassilly made his NYCO debut in the title role of Tchaikovsky's Cherevichki (performed under the title The Golden Slipper) opposite Beverly Sills as Oxana on October 13, 1955. In 1959 he is Énée in Les Troyens conducted by Robert Lawrence.

Cassilly sang regularly at the NYCO in productions through 1966, often in contemporary operas or in rarely heard works. He notably sang in several American premieres with the company including Ferdinand in Frank Martin's The Tempest in 1957 and the Jailer in Luigi Dallapiccola's Il prigioniero, with Norman Treigle and Leopold Stokowski, in 1960. His other roles with the NYCO included Don José in Carmen, Edgar Linton in Carlisle Floyd's Wuthering Heights, Paco in La vida breve, Peter Quint in The Turn of the Screw, Pinkerton in Madama Butterfly, Sam Polk in Susannah, the Soldier in Bucci's Tale for a Deaf Ear, the Tenor in Hugo Weisgall's The Tenor, and the title roles in Stravinsky's Oedipus rex among others. His last performance as a regular member of the company was in March 1966 as Sergei in Dmitri Shostakovich's Lady Macbeth of the Mtsensk District (performed under the title Katerina Ismailova).

During his time with NYCO Cassilly was also busy with many other musical ensembles and organizations in New York City. He sang often with the American Opera Society (AOS) in concert performances of operas at Carnegie Hall and Town Hall, sharing the stage with such opera greats as Walter Berry, Marilyn Horne, Christa Ludwig, Regina Resnik, Giulietta Simionato, Eleanor Steber, and Dame Joan Sutherland among others. His roles with the AOS included Percy in Anna Bolena (1957), Tebaldo in I Capuleti e i Montecchi (1958), Énée in Les Troyens (1960), Orombello in Beatrice di Tenda (1961), and Pylade in Iphigénie en Tauride (1965). He also sang the role of Hermann in a concert performance of The Queen of Spades opposite Phyllis Curtin in the title role and sang the role of Martin in Aaron Copland's The Tender Land, both with the New York Philharmonic in 1965.

Although Cassilly was primarily working in New York during these years, he did travel frequently for performances with other companies and musical ensembles both in United States and internationally. In 1955 he made his first appearance in Philadelphia at the Mann Center for the Performing Arts with the Robin Hood Dell Orchestra as Don José in a concert performance Carmen. That same year he sang his first Mario Cavaradossi in Tosca opposite Licia Albanese in the title role in his debut with the Philadelphia Grand Opera Company. He returned with a critically acclaimed performance singing the roles of Don José (1958) and Pinkerton (1958, 1960, 1961). He also sang a few times with the Philadelphia Lyric Opera Company during these years in the roles of Oedipus rex (1959), Sam Polk (1960), and the title role in Wagner's Lohengrin (1961).

Cassilly made his first appearance outside of the United States in 1957 with the Canadian Opera Company as Cavaradossi in Tosca. He reprised the role later that year at Fort Worth Opera with Phyllis Curtin in the title role and Walter Cassel as Scarpia. In February 1958 he sang Pollione in Bellini's Norma with New Orleans Opera. This was followed by his European debut in July 1958 portraying the role of Sam Polk in Carlisle Floyd's Susannah at the Brussels World's Fair in a production transported from the NYCO. In the summer of 1959 he sang the title role in Peter Grimes and portrayed the role of Don José opposite Nell Rankin's Carmen with Cincinnati Opera. The following November he made his first appearance with the Lyric Opera of Chicago as Laca Klemeň in Leoš Janáček's Jenůfa opposite Sylvia Fisher.

In 1960 Cassilly sang Don José for three house debut performances: the Houston Grand Opera (in January opposite Claramae Turner as Carmen), the Vancouver Opera (in April with Nan Merriman as Carmen), and the Opera Company of Boston (in May with Gloria Lane as Carmen). In the summer of that year he returned to Cincinnati Opera to sing his first Radames in Aida, and in the Fall he went back to the Lyric Opera of Chicago to sing both Don José (opposite Jean Madeira) and Pinkerton (opposite Leontyne Price). He performed the role of Roméo opposite Pierrette Alarie's Juliette in Gounod's Roméo et Juliette in Montreal in January 1961. In 1962 he returned to the Houston Grand Opera to sing two new roles, Canio in I Pagliacci and Walther in Die Meistersinger von Nürnberg. In the Summer of 1963 he sang his first Manrico in Verdi's Il trovatore with Lucine Amara as Leonora for his debut with Central City Opera. This was followed by his first Don Alvaro in Verdi's La forza del destino in November with New Orleans Opera. In 1964 he debuted with the San Francisco Opera as Max in Der Freischütz and returned to Cincinnati Opera to sing his first Baron von Eisenstein in Die Fledermaus.

== International fame and the Hamburg State Opera years: 1965–1978 ==
In 1965, Cassilly returned to Europe having not performed there since his 1958 debut, singing the title role in Heinrich Sutermeister's Raskolnikoff at the Grand Théâtre de Genève. Earning rave reviews, Cassilly was soon approached with offers to join the Hamburg State Opera (HSO) and the Deutsche Oper Berlin. He decided to accept a single engagement in Berlin but signed a longterm contract with the HSO, ultimately moving his family to that city.

He was the HSO's leading dramatic tenor between 1966–78 where he sang a total of 55 roles, often singing as many as three or four different roles per week. He was a particular house favorite in the Wagner roles of Siegmund, Walther, Tristan, and Tannhäuser. He made his debut with the company singing Cavaradossi opposite the Tosca by Suzanne Sarroca in October 1966. He notably appeared as Florestan in the company's 1968 film of Beethoven's Fidelio, opposite Anja Silja. He portrayed Aron in a critically acclaimed 1974 production of Schoenberg's Moses und Aron with the company which was later recorded under conductor Pierre Boulez. The city of Hamburg honored him by bestowing on him the title of "Kammersänger". During his time there he also would travel periodically to sing with the Badisches Staatstheater Karlsruhe and the Nationaltheater Mannheim.

The year 1965 not only marked Cassily's first major European appearance, but also brought a personal triumph for Cassilly in February of that year: singing the title role in Charles Gounod's Faust for his first professional opera performance in his home city at the Baltimore Civic Opera. The following October he made his debut with Montreal Opera singing Radames with conductor Zubin Mehta, Virginia Zeani is Aida and Lili Chookasian as Amneris. This was followed by a performance of Britten's War Requiem with the San Antonio Symphony. In 1966 Cassily returned to the San Francisco Opera to sing Grigoriy in Boris Godunov and Aegisth in Elektra.

In April 1967 he made his Seattle Opera debut singing Manrico to Eileen Farrell's Leonora and Sherrill Milnes's Count DiLuna in Verdi's Il Trovatore. That summer he performed at Lincoln Center in Washinginton D.C. with the Hamburg State Opera's transport productions of Mathis der Maler (as the Archbishop) and Jenůfa. This was followed by his first performance of the title role in Verdi's Otello with HSO the following September. In October 1967 he returned to Vancouver Opera to sing the role of Dick Johnson for the first time in Puccini's La fanciulla del West with Dorothy Kirsten as Minnie, Chester Ludgin as Jack Rance, and Fausto Cleva conducting. The following December he sang Erik to Ingrid Bjoner's Senta in The Flying Dutchman at the New Orleans Opera.

On February 16, 1968, Cassilly made his debut at the Royal Opera, Covent Garden as Laca Klemeň to Marie Collier's Jenůfa with Astrid Varnay as the Kostelnicka. He returned there almost every year through 1982, portraying the roles of Aeneas in Les Troyens (1977), the Drum Major in Wozzeck (1974), Florestan (1969), Herod in Salome (1979), Laca Klemeň (1968–1972), the title role in Peter Grimes (1976), Otello (1968), Siegmund in Wagner's Die Walküre (1971–1982), the title role in Tannhäuser (1972–1974), and Troilus in Troilus and Cressida (1975). Cassilly notably recorded several of these roles with the Royal Opera, including Siegmund and Troilus.

Cassilly made his only appearance at La Scala in January 1970 as Samson in Saint-Saëns's Samson et Dalila. The following April he sang Otello for his first appearance at the Bavarian State Opera and on June 13 sang Tannhäuser to Claire Watson's Elisabeth for his Vienna State Opera debut. In October he made his first appearance at the San Diego Opera as Calaf in Turandot followed by his Pittsburgh Opera debut in December as Tannhäuser.

In 1972 Cassily returned to the San Francisco Opera to sing Radames in Aida and the mayor in the American premiere of Gottfried von Einem's The Visit of the Old Lady. On January 20, 1973, he made his highly anticipated Metropolitan Opera debut as Radamès opposite Lucine Amara as Aida, Irene Dalis as Amneris, Cornell MacNeil as Amonasro, and Giorgio Tozzi as Ramfis. The following March he sang Tannhäuser at the Opéra de Bordeaux and on June 3 made his debut at the Opéra National de Paris as Aegisth and later in the month Siegmund. The following summer he sang the role of Jason in Luigi Cherubini's rarely heard Médée at the Caramoor International Music Festival, which was also transported to New York City for a performance as of part the NYCO opera season.

In 1975 Cassily sang the Siegmund opposite Birgit Nilsson's Bruennhilde at the Orange Festival, a pairing which was repeated the following year at the Palau de la Música Catalana in Barcelona. In January 1976 he appeared for the first time at the Teatro Nacional de São Carlos as Otello. In 1977 he sang Tannhäuser for his debut with the Royal Danish Opera.

== The Metropolitan Opera years: 1978–1990 ==
In 1978, Cassilly joined the roster of the Metropolitan Opera. after not appearing there since his debut at the house in 1973. He returned with a critically acclaimed performance of the title role in Wagner's Tannhäuser on January 26, 1978, alongside Teresa Kubiak as Elisabeth, Bernd Weikl as Wolfram, and Grace Bumbry as Venus. Except for 1988, he appeared at the Met every year With the exception of the year 1988, he appeared at the Met every year through 1990. Among the roles he performed at the Met during this period were Aegisth (1980–1984), Canio (1980–1981), Captain Vere in Billy Budd (1980–1989), Don José (1980), Drum Major (1980–1989), Herod (1981–1990), Jimmy Mahoney in Rise and Fall of the City of Mahagonny (1979–1984), the title role in Œdipus rex (in John Dexter's production, 1981), Otello (1978–1980), Peter Grimes (1983), Samson (1981, opposite Viorica Cortez), Tannhäuser (1978–1987), and Tristan in Tristan und Isolde (1981).

His performances of Tannhäuser and Jimmy Mahoney were recorded for broadcast on PBS's Great Performances both of which were later released on DVD. He performed the role of Jimmy Mahoney (The Rise and Fall of the City of Mahagonny) for the Metropolitan Opera Centennial Gala in 1983. His last performance at the Met was on November 23, 1990, as Herod with Hildegard Behrens in the title role. It was his 157th performance at the Met and also his final appearance on the opera stage.

During his years as a regular performer at the Met, Cassilly continued to appear in operas and concerts throughout the world. In 1978 he sang Siegmund at the Palais Garnier and he returned to the Houston Grand Opera in November of that year to sing Laca Klemeň. In 1979 he returned to the Grand Théâtre de Genève to sing Tannhäuser to Éva Marton's Elisabeth. In 1980 he sang Otello with the Frankfurt Opera, the Nationaltheater Mannheim, the Edmonton Opera Association, and the Canadian Opera Company. He also sang Tannhäuser in Genoa and Geneva. In 1981 he sang Otello in Toronto again and repeated the role with Pittsburgh Opera in 1982. He returned to the Palais Garnier in July 1982 to sing Cannio followed by a portrayal of the mystical shepherd in Karol Szymanowski's King Roger with Wolf Trap Opera in August. In October 1982 he portrayed Samson opposite Fiorenza Cossotto's Dalila for the 40th Anniversary of New Orleans Opera.

In March 1983 Cassilly sang the role of Luka Kuzmič for the American premiere of Leoš Janáček's From the House of the Dead in a concert with the New York Philharmonic. The following June he sang Tannhäuser for his first appearance at the Liceu and in July repeated that role for his South American debut at the Teatro Municipal in Santiago, Chile. In September 1983 he returned to San Diego Opera to sing Peter Grimes with Patricia Craig and in October returned to the San Francisco Opera to sing Otello. In March 1986 he sang Jimmy Mahoney for his only appearance with Scottish Opera and in 1988 he returned to the Lyric Opera of Chicago to sing Tannhäuser.

Cassilly lived in Brookline, a suburb of Boston suburb of Brookline and was a professor of voice at Boston University, where he had taught from 1986 until his death.

== Legacy ==
His recordings include The Tenor (with Chester Ludgin, 1958), Les troyens (with Eleanor Steber and Regina Resnik, 1960), Il prigioniero (with Treigle, Anne McKnight, and Stokowski, 1960), Susannah (with Phyllis Curtin and Treigle, 1962), La forza del destino (excerpts, with Eileen Farrell, 1963), The Tender Land (with Joy Clements, abridged, conducted by the composer, Aaron Copland, 1965), Salome (with Dame Gwyneth Jones, conducted by Karl Böhm, 1970), Moses und Aron (conducted by Pierre Boulez, 1974), Leonore (with Edda Moser, 1976) and Troilus and Cressida (with Dame Janet Baker, 1976).

In 2010, his performance of Wozzeck from the Met, with José van Dam and Silja, was published on compact discs. Perhaps more important, his 1979 Mahagonny and 1982 Tannhäuser from the Met, as well as the Fidelio film from Hamburg, have been issued on DVD.

In 1986, Cassilly joined the voice faculty at Boston University where he taught until his death twelve years later in Boston on January 30, 1998. Just a few days prior to his death he had fallen on the ice and hit his head. The doctors at the time thought it was a mild concussion but the fall in reality caused a cerebral hemorrhage which was fatal. At the time of his death he was married to Metropolitan Opera soprano Patricia Craig.

== Sources ==
- John Warrack & Ewan West. The Concise Oxford Dictionary of Opera, Oxford University Press (1996); ISBN 0-19-280028-0
