= Raskolnikov (disambiguation) =

Rodion Romanovich Raskolnikov the fictional protagonist of Dostoyevsky's novel Crime and Punishment.

Raskolnikov may also refer to:

== Things named after the character ==
- Raskolnikov (band) - Netherlands
- Raskolnikov (swiss band) - Switzerland
- Raskolnikow (film), a 1923 German film directed by Robert Wiene
- Raskolnikov (novel), a 1996 Italian novel written by Laura Mancinelli
- Raskolnikoff, a tragedy by Leo Birinski
- Raskolnikoff, an opera by Heinrich Sutermeister
- Raskolnikoff, Overture-fantasy No. 1, by Emil von Reznicek

== Other ==
- Raskolnikov (surname)
