= Patricia Craig =

Patricia Craig may refer to:

- Patricia Craig (soprano) (born 1947), American operatic soprano and voice teacher
- Patricia Craig (writer) (born 1952), writer and anthologist from Northern Ireland
