= Uno sguardo dal ponte =

1961 opera by Renzo Rosselini

Uno sguardo dal ponte is an opera in two acts by composer Renzo Rossellini to an Italian-language libretto by Gerardo Guerrieri which is based on Arthur Miller's play A View from the Bridge. The opera premiered at the Teatro dell'Opera di Roma on 11 March 1961, using a staging by Franco Rossellini, the composer's son. The premiere cast included Clara Petrella, Gianna Galli, Alfredo Kraus, Giuseppe Valdengo, and Nicola Rossi-Lemeni. It was subsequently staged in Frankfurt, Barcelona, Zagreb and several Italian cities.The Philadelphia Lyric Opera Company presented the United States premiere of the opera on 17 October 1967 with Rossi-Lemeni as Eddie Carbone, Gloria Lane as Beatrice, Galli as Catherine, Mario Basiola as the lawyer Alfieri; Anton Guadagno conducted and the direction and stage set was as in the European performances.

== Roles ==
- Eddie Carbone (baritone) – Nicola Rossi-Lemeni
- Beatrice Carbone, his wife (soprano) – Clara Petrella
- Catherine, their niece (soprano) – Gianna Galli
- Rodolfo (tenor) – Ruggero Bondini
- Marco, Rodolfo's brother (bass) – Giovanni Ciminelli
- Alfieri, lawyer (bass) – Giuseppe Valdengo
- Louis (bass) – Giovanni Ciavola
- Mike (tenor) – Nino Mazziotti
- Immigration Officer (baritone) – Giulio Mastrangelo
- Tony (tenor) – Rolando Sessi
