= Cyril Gell =

Background information
- Born: 1909; Bedford
- Died: 4 September 1994 (aged 84–85) Sandy, Bedfordshire
- Occupation: Conductor

Cyril William Gell ARCO LRAM FGSM (1909–1994) was an English musician, conductor of the BBC Singers and former professor at the Guildhall School of Music. Gell often acted as conductor on Friday Night Is Music Night and was chorus director on a number of BBC television movies including a production of The Saint of Bleecker Street in 1956, a production of Il trovatore in 1957, a production of Madam Butterfly in 1957, and a production of Rigoletto in 1958.

== Life ==
Cyril William Gell was born in Bedford in 1909 and educated in the town at Bedford Modern School. After school, he went up to Worcester College, Oxford as an organ scholar and was later appointed organist to the Duke of Bedford at Woburn Abbey in 1930.

Gell was appointed assistant director of music at Bradfield College in 1935 and was later staff organist with the Granada Theatres from 1937 touring with Dudley Beaven (piano and organ show), broadcasting and recording. In 1938 he was appointed director of music at Bedales School but joined the music staff of the BBC in 1955 where he conducted the BBC Singers, in particular for Friday Night Is Music Night. In addition, he performed contemporary music by young composers, conducting The Ambrosian Singers in their premiere of The Birds by Kenneth Leighton. He was musical director of the Plymouth Philharmonic Chorus between 1958 and 1960 and afterwards a professor at the Guildhall School of Music between 1960 and 1973.

== Conducting ==
Gell was chorus director on a number of BBC television movies including The Saint of Bleecker Street in 1956, a production of Il trovatore in 1957, a production of Madam Butterfly in 1957, and a production of the opera Rigoletto in 1958.

== Personal life ==
Gell died in Sandy, Bedfordshire, on 4 September 1994.
