= Bicycle Thieves =

1948 film by Vittorio De Sica

- Theatrical release poster
- Italian: Ladri di biciclette
- Directed by: Vittorio De Sica
- Screenplay by: Oreste Biancoli; Suso D'Amico; Vittorio De Sica; Adolfo Franci; Gerardo Guerrieri; Gherardo Gherardi; Cesare Zavattini
- Story by: Cesare Zavattini
- Based on: Bicycle Thieves; 1946 novel by Luigi Bartolini
- Produced by: Giuseppe Amato; Vittorio De Sica
- Starring: Lamberto Maggiorani; Enzo Staiola; Lianella Carell
- Cinematography: Carlo Montuori
- Edited by: Eraldo Da Roma
- Music by: Alessandro Cicognini
- Production company: Produzioni De Sica
- Distributed by: Ente Nazionale Industrie Cinematografiche
- Release date: 24 November 1948 (Italy)
- Running time: 89 minutes
- Country: Italy
- Language: Italian
- Budget: $133,000
- Box office: $428,978

Bicycle Thieves (Italian: Ladri di biciclette), also known as The Bicycle Thief, is a 1948 Italian neorealist drama film directed by Vittorio De Sica. It follows the story of a poor father searching in post–World War II Rome for his stolen bicycle, without which he will lose the job which was to be the salvation of his young family.

Adapted for the screen by Cesare Zavattini from the 1946 novel by Luigi Bartolini, and starring Lamberto Maggiorani as the desperate father and Enzo Staiola as his plucky young son, Bicycle Thieves received an Academy Honorary Award (most outstanding foreign language film) in 1950, and in 1952 was deemed the greatest film of all time by Sight & Sound magazine's poll of filmmakers and critics; fifty years later another poll organized by the same magazine ranked it sixth among the greatest-ever films. In the 2012 version of the list the film ranked 33rd among critics and 10th among directors.

The film was also cited by Turner Classic Movies as one of the most influential films in cinema history, and is considered part of the canon of classic cinema. Bicycle Thieves was voted number 3 on the prestigious Brussels 12 list at the 1958 World Expo, and number 4 in Empire magazine's "The 100 Best Films of World Cinema" in 2010. It was also included on the Italian Ministry of Cultural Heritage’s 100 Italian films to be saved, a list of 100 films that "have changed the collective memory of the country between 1942 and 1978."

== Plot ==
In post-World War II Rome, Antonio Ricci desperately needs work to support his wife Maria, their son Bruno, and their baby. He is offered a job posting advertising bills but tells Maria he cannot accept because the job requires a bicycle. Maria resolutely strips the bed of her dowry bedsheets‍—‌prized possessions for a poor family‍—‌and takes them to the pawn shop, where they bring enough to redeem Antonio's bicycle. On his first day of work, Antonio is at the top of a ladder when a young man steals the bicycle. Antonio runs after him but is thrown off the trail by the thief's accomplices. The police file Antonio's complaint but say that there is little they can do.

Returning home embittered, Antonio understands that his only option is to search for the bicycle himself. He asks for help from a political comrade, who in turn mobilizes his waste collector colleagues. At dawn, they and Bruno go to search for the bicycle at the Piazza Vittorio market, where stolen goods often surface. They find a bicycle frame that might be Antonio's, but the vendors refuse to allow them to examine the serial number. They call over a carabiniere, who orders the vendors to allow him to read the serial number. The officer will not allow them to examine it for themselves, but the serial number does not match that of the missing bicycle. At the Porta Portese market, Antonio and Bruno spot a man whom Antonio believes to be the thief talking with an old man. The thief eludes them and the old man feigns ignorance. They follow the old man into a church where a charitable service for the poor is underway, but he too slips away from them.

A hopeless Antonio turns to a supposed "holy woman", but her sibylline response is almost a joke. Immediately afterward, Antonio encounters the thief by chance in a disreputable district and pursues him into a brothel, whose denizens eject them. In the street, hostile neighbors gather as Antonio accuses the thief, who suddenly suffers an apparent medical emergency, for which the crowd blames Antonio. Bruno fetches a policeman, who searches the thief's apartment without success. The policeman tells Antonio the case is weak‍—‌Antonio has no witnesses and the neighbors are certain to provide the thief with an alibi. Antonio and Bruno leave in despair amid jeers and threats from the crowd.

Their way home takes them to the Stadio Nazionale PNF football stadium. Antonio sees an unattended bicycle near a doorway and, after much anguished indecision, instructs Bruno to take the tram to a stop nearby and wait. Antonio circles the unattended bicycle and jumps on it. Instantly, the hue and cry is raised and Bruno—who has missed the tram—is stunned to see his father pursued, surrounded, and pulled from the bicycle. As Antonio is being muscled toward the police station, the bicycle's owner notices Bruno in tears and, in a moment of compassion, tells the others to release Antonio. Antonio and Bruno then walk off slowly through the hostile crowd. Antonio fights back tears and Bruno takes his hand.

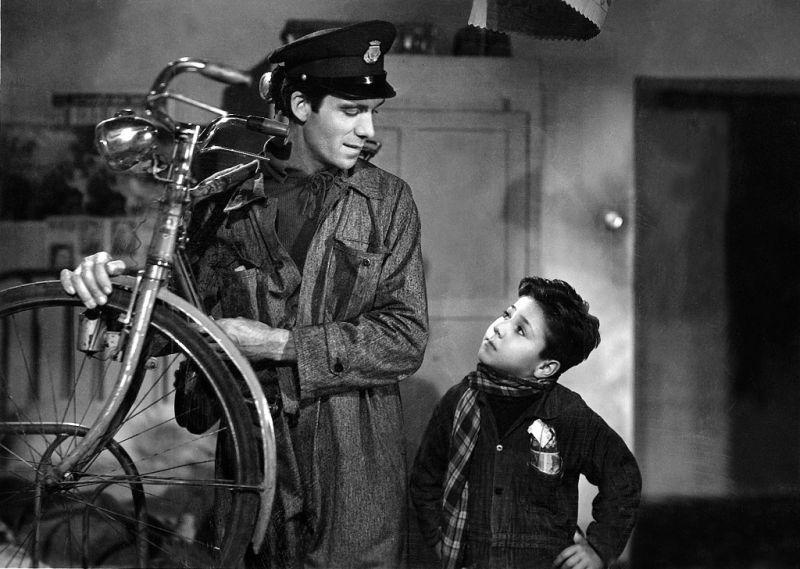
The bike redeemed from the pawn shop

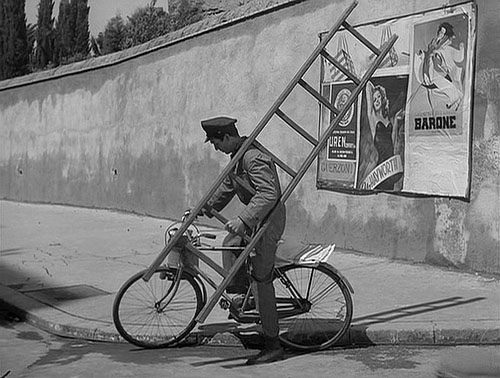
First day on the job

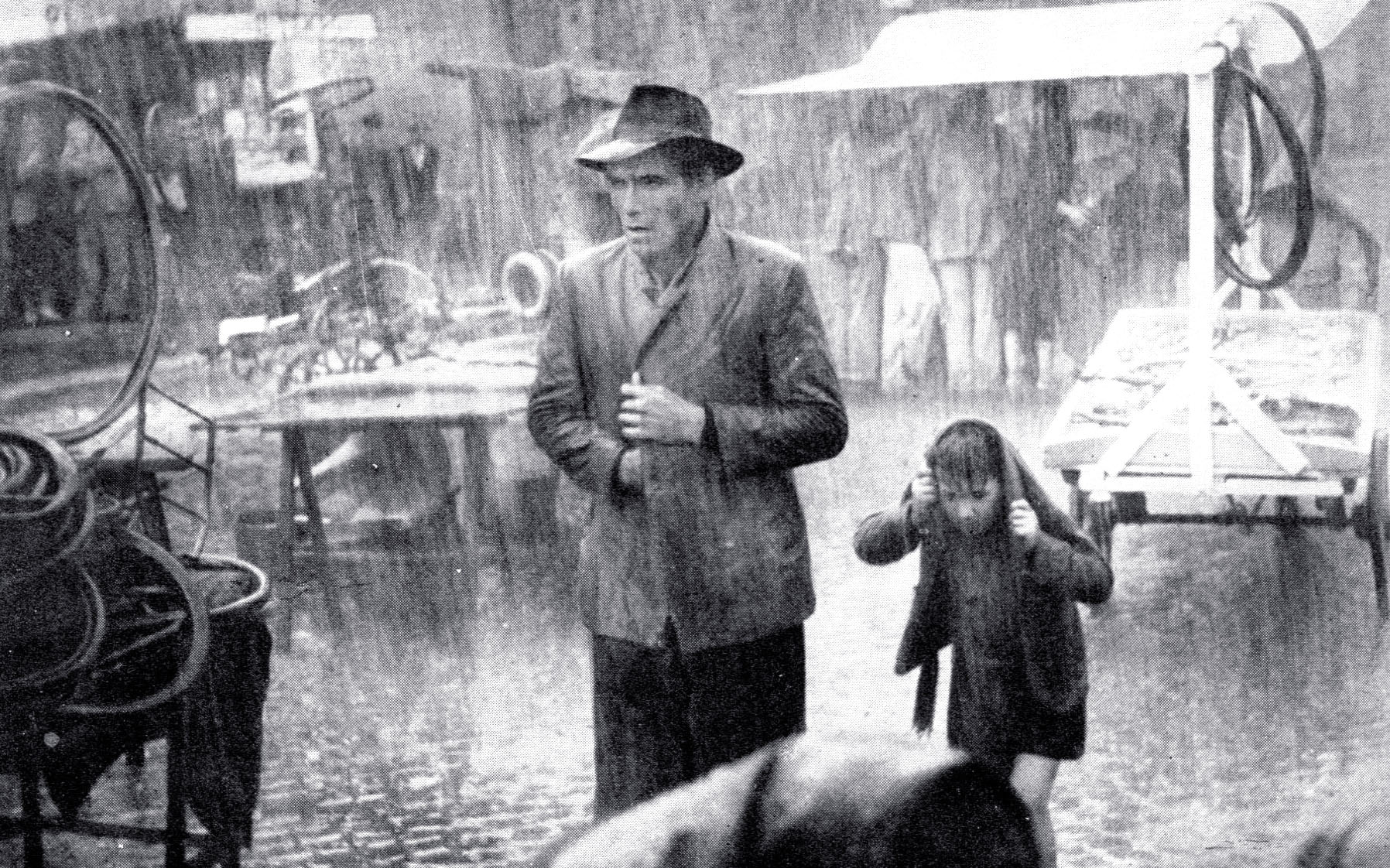
In search of the stolen bike

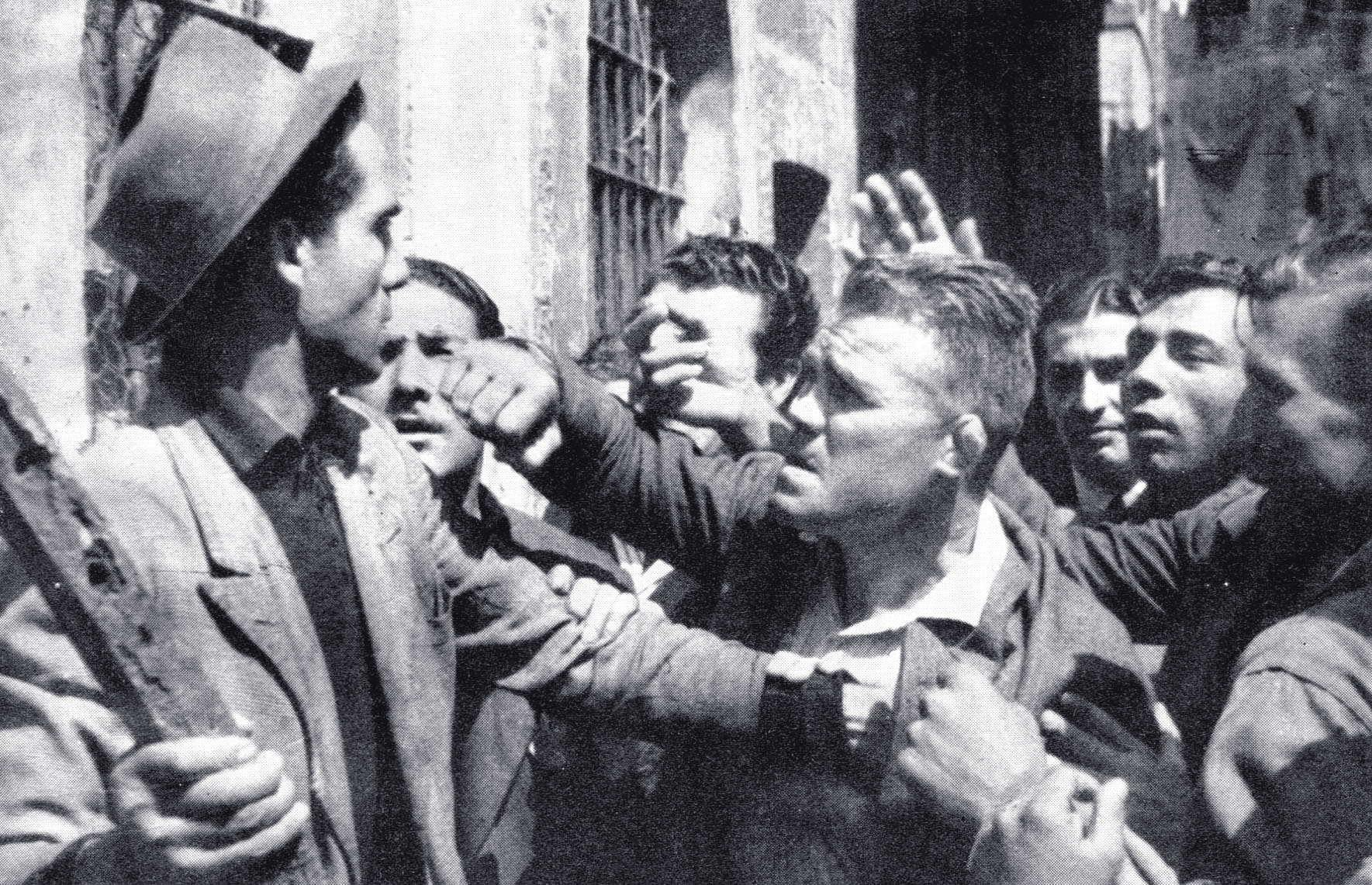
The thief's neighbors threaten Antonio

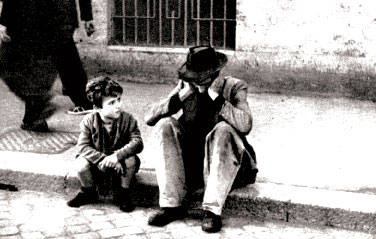
All seems lost

== Cast ==
- Lamberto Maggiorani as Antonio Ricci
- Enzo Staiola as Bruno Ricci, Antonio's son
- Lianella Carell as Maria Ricci, Antonio's wife
- Elena Altieri as the Charitable Lady
- Gino Saltamerenda as Baiocco, Antonio's friend who helps search
- Giulio Chiari as a Beggar
- Vittorio Antonucci as Alfredo Catelli, the Bicycle Thief
- Michele Sakara as the Secretary of the Charity Organization
- Fausto Guerzoni as an Amateur Actor
- Carlo Jachino as a Beggar
- Emma Druetti

=== Uncredited ===
- Giulio Battiferri as a citizen who protects the real thief
- Sergio Leone as a seminary student
- Mario Meniconi as Meniconi, the street sweeper
- Checco Rissone as a guard in Piazza Vittorio
- Peppino Spadaro as a police officer
- Nando Bruno
- Eolo Capritti
- Memmo Carotenuto
- Giovanni Corporale
- Umberto Spadaro

== Production ==
Bicycle Thieves is the best-known work of Italian neorealism, a movement that informally began with Roberto Rossellini's Rome, Open City (1945) and brought a new degree of realism to Italian cinema. De Sica had just made Shoeshine (1946), but was unable to get financial backing from any major studio for the film, so he raised the money himself from friends. Wanting to portray the poverty and unemployment of post-war Italy, he co-wrote a script with Cesare Zavattini and others using only the title and few plot devices of a little-known novel of the time by poet and artist Luigi Bartolini. Following the precepts of neorealism, De Sica shot only on location (that is, no studio sets) and cast only untrained actors. (Lamberto Maggiorani, for example, was a factory worker.) That some actors' roles paralleled their lives off screen added realism to the film. De Sica cast Maggiorani when he had brought his young son to an audition for the film. He later cast the 8-year-old Enzo Staiola when he noticed the young boy watching the film's production on a street while helping his father sell flowers.

Staiola was almost run over on two occasions while crossing the street. De Sica chose to keep both incidents in the finished film.

The film's final shot of Antonio and Bruno walking away from the camera into the distance is an homage to many of the films of Charlie Chaplin, who was De Sica's favourite filmmaker.

Uncovering the drama in everyday life, the wonderful in the daily news.

— Vittorio De Sica in Abbiamo domandato a De Sica perché fa un film dal Ladro di biciclette (We asked De Sica why he makes a movie on the Bicycle Thief) – La fiera letteraria, 6/2/48

== Title ==
The original Italian title is Ladri di biciclette. It literally translates into English as "thieves of bicycles"; both ladri and biciclette are plural. In Bartolini's novel, the title referred to a post-war culture of rampant thievery and disrespect for civil order, countered only by an inept police force and indifferent allied occupiers.

When the film was screened in the United States in 1949, Bosley Crowther referred to it as The Bicycle Thief in his review in The New York Times, and this came to be the title by which the film was known in English. When the film was re-released in the late-1990s, San Francisco Chronicle film critic Bob Graham said that he preferred that version, stating, "Purists have criticized the English title of the film as a poor translation of the Italian ladri, which is plural. What blindness! The Bicycle Thief is one of those wonderful titles whose power does not sink in until the film is over". The 2007 Criterion Collection release in North America uses the title Bicycle Thieves.

== Reception ==
=== Critical response ===
When Bicycle Thieves was released in Italy, it was viewed with hostility and as portraying Italians in a negative way. Italian critic Guido Aristarco praised it, but also complained that "sentimentality might at times take the place of artistic emotion." Fellow Italian neorealist film director Luchino Visconti criticized the film, saying that it was a mistake to use a professional actor to dub over Lamberto Maggiorani's dialogue. Luigi Bartolini, the author of the novel from which de Sica drew his title, was highly critical of the film, feeling that the spirit of his book had been thoroughly betrayed because his protagonist was a middle-class intellectual and his theme was the breakdown of civil order.

Contemporary reviews elsewhere were positive. Bosley Crowther, film critic for The New York Times, lauded the film and its message in his review. He wrote, "Again the Italians have sent us a brilliant and devastating film in Vittorio De Sica's rueful drama of modern city life, The Bicycle Thief. Widely and fervently heralded by those who had seen it abroad (where it already has won several prizes at various film festivals), this heart-tearing picture of frustration, which came to [the World Theater] yesterday, bids fair to fulfill all the forecasts of its absolute triumph over here. For once more the talented De Sica, who gave us the shattering Shoeshine, that desperately tragic demonstration of juvenile corruption in post-war Rome, has laid hold upon and sharply imaged in simple and realistic terms a major—indeed, a fundamental and universal—dramatic theme. It is the isolation and loneliness of the little man in this complex social world that is ironically blessed with institutions to comfort and protect mankind". Pierre Leprohon wrote in Cinéma D'Aujourd'hui that "what must not be ignored on the social level is that the character is shown not at the beginning of a crisis but at its outcome. One need only to look at his face, his uncertain gait, his hesitant or fearful attitudes to understand that Ricci is already a victim, a diminished man who has lost his confidence." Then Paris-based Lotte H. Eisner called it the best Italian film since World War II, and UK critic Robert Winnington called it "the most successful record of any foreign film in British cinema."

When the film was re-released in the late 1990s Bob Graham, staff film critic for the San Francisco Chronicle, gave the drama a positive review: "The roles are played by non-actors, Lamberto Maggiorani as the father and Enzo Staiola as the solemn boy, who sometimes appears to be a miniature man. They bring a grave dignity to De Sica's unblinking view of post-war Italy. The wheel of life turns and grinds people down; the man who was riding high in the morning is brought low by nightfall. It is impossible to imagine this story in any other form than De Sica's. The new black-and-white print has an extraordinary range of grey tones that get darker as life closes in". In 1999, Chicago Sun-Times film reviewer Roger Ebert wrote that "The Bicycle Thief is so well-entrenched as an official masterpiece that it is a little startling to visit it again after many years and realize that it is still alive and has strength and freshness. Given an honorary Oscar in 1949, routinely voted one of the greatest films of all time, revered as one of the foundation stones of Italian neorealism, it is a simple, powerful film about a man who needs a job". Ebert gave the film four out of four stars and added the film to his "The Great Movies" list. In 2020, A. O. Scott praised the film in an essay entitled "Why You Should Still Care About 'Bicycle Thieves."

Bicycle Thieves is a fixture on the British Film Institute's Sight & Sound critics' and directors' polls of the greatest films ever made. The film ranked 1st on the critic's poll in 1952 and was tied for 6th with Ivan the Terrible in 1962. It ranked 11th on the magazine's 1992 Critics' poll, 45th in the 2002 critics' poll and 6th on the 2002 directors' top ten poll. In The Sight and Sound Greatest Films of All Time 2012, it was ranked 10th in the directors' poll and 33rd on the 2012 critics' poll. The Village Voice ranked the film at number 37 in its Top 250 "Best Films of the Century" list in 1999, based on a poll of critics. In 2008, the film was voted at No. 99 on the list of "100 Greatest Films" by the prominent French magazine Cahiers du cinéma. In The Sight and Sound Greatest Films of All Time 2022, Bicycle Thieves was ranked at 41st place in the critics' poll and at 20th place in the directors' poll.

The Japanese filmmaker Akira Kurosawa cited this movie as one of his 100 favorite films in a list compiled after his death. The film was included by the Vatican in a list of important films compiled in 1995, under the category of "Values".

Bicycle Thieves has continued to gain very high praise from contemporary critics. On the review aggregator site Rotten Tomatoes, 98% of 65 critics' reviews are positive, with an average rating of 9.60/10. The site's critics consensus reads, "An Italian neorealism exemplar, Bicycle Thieves thrives on its non-flashy performances and searing emotion."

=== Awards and nominations ===
- Locarno International Film Festival, Switzerland: Special Prize of the Jury, Vittorio De Sica; 1949.
- National Board of Review: NBR Award, Best Director, Vittorio De Sica; Best Film (Any Language), Italy; 1949.
- New York Film Critics Circle Awards: NYFCC Award, Best Foreign Language Film, Italy; 1949.
- Academy Awards: Honorary Award, as The Bicycle Thief (Italy). Voted by the Academy Board of Governors as the most outstanding foreign language film released in the United States during 1949; 1950.
- Academy Awards: Nominated, Oscar, Best Writing, Screenplay; as The Bicycle Thief, Cesare Zavattini; 1950.
- British Academy of Film and Television Arts: BAFTA Film Award, Best Film from any Source; 1950.
- Bodil Awards, Copenhagen, Denmark: Bodil, Best European Film (Bedste europæiske film), Vittorio De Sica; 1950.
- Golden Globes: Golden Globe, Best Foreign Film, Italy; 1950.
- Cinema Writers Circle Awards, Spain: CEC Award, Best Foreign Film (Mejor Película Extranjera), Italy; 1951.
- Kinema Junpo Awards, Tokyo, Japan: Kinema Junpo Award, Best Foreign Language Film, Vittorio De Sica; 1951.
- Best Cinematography (Migliore Fotografia), Carlo Montuori.
- Best Director (Migliore Regia), Vittorio De Sica.
- Best Film (Miglior Film a Soggetto).
- Best Score (Miglior Commento Musicale), Alessandro Cicognini.
- Best Screenplay (Migliore Sceneggiatura), Cesare Zavattini, Vittorio De Sica, Suso Cecchi d'Amico, Oreste Biancoli, Adolfo Franci, and Gerardo Guerrieri.
- Best Story (Miglior Soggetto), Cesare Zavattini.
- Listed as one of TCM's top 15 most influential films list, as The Bicycle Thief (1947),
- Ranked #4 in Empire magazines "The 100 Best Films Of World Cinema" in 2010.
- Voted #2 in BBC Culture's poll of 209 critics in 43 countries for the greatest foreign-language film of all time.

== Legacy ==
Many directors have cited the film as a major influence including Satyajit Ray, Ken Loach, Giorgio Mangiamele, Bimal Roy, Anurag Kashyap, Balu Mahendra, Vetrimaaran and Basu Chatterjee. In 2016, the Directors Guild of America ranked the film 68th on its list of The 80 Best-Directed Films since the Guild’s founding in 1936.

The film was noteworthy for film directors of the Iranian New Wave, such as Jafar Panahi and Dariush Mehrjui.

The film was one of 39 foreign films recommended by Martin Scorsese to Colin Levy.

It was parodied in the film The Icicle Thief (1989). and in The Carol Burnett Show sketch "Salute to Foreign Films."

The film features incidentally in the 1992 Robert Altman film The Player. A Hollywood studio executive (played by Tim Robbins) tracks a screenwriter to a theater showing Bicycle Thieves and stages what he represents as a chance meeting.

Norman Loftis's film Messenger (1994) is considered to be a remake of Bicycle Thieves.

The episode "The Thief" from the American comedy-drama series Master of None is heavily influenced by Bicycle Thieves.

== See also ==
- List of films considered the best
- List of films about bicycles and cycling
