= Enzo Staiola =

Italian actor (1939–2025)

- Staiola in 1954
- Born: 15 November 1939; Rome, Italy
- Died: 4 June 2025 (aged 85); Rome, Italy
- Occupation: Actor
- Years active: 1948–1977

Enzo Staiola (15 November 1939 – 4 June 2025) was an Italian actor, best known for playing, at the age of eight, the role of Bruno Ricci in Vittorio De Sica's neorealist 1948 film Bicycle Thieves. He appeared in several other films including, in 1954, the American-produced The Barefoot Contessa with Humphrey Bogart. As an adult he became a mathematics teacher and later also worked as a land registry clerk.

Staiola died after a fall on 4 June 2025, at the age of 85.

== Selected filmography ==
Year	English title	Original title	Role	Notes
1948	Bicycle Thieves	Ladri di biciclette	Bruno Ricci	
1949	Marechiaro		Luca as a child	
1950	Volcano	Vulcano	Nino	
1950	The White Line	Cuori senza frontiere	Pasqualino Sebastian	
1950	Strano appuntamento		Older son	credited as Enzo Stajola
1951	I'll Get You for This		Toni	aka Lucky Nick Cain
1951	A Tale of Five Cities	Passaporto per l'oriente	A boy	
1952	In Olden Days	Altri tempi - Zibaldone n. 1	Newsagent's son	aka Times Gone By
1952	Black Feathers	Penne nere	Antonio 'Tonino' Cossutti	
1952	Guilt Is Not Mine	L'ingiusta condanna		credited as Enzo Stajola
1953	The Return of Don Camillo	Il ritorno di don Camillo	Mario Cagnola	
1953	Journey to Love	Buon viaggio pover'uomo	Cesar	credited as Enzo Stajola
1954	The Barefoot Contessa	La contessa scalza	Busboy	
1961	Sword Without a Country	Spade senza bandiera		
1977	The Pyjama Girl Case	La ragazza dal pigiama giallo		final film role
