= Elisabeth Carron =

American operatic soprano (1922–2016)

Elisabeth Carron (born Elisabetta Caradonna; February 12, 1922 – December 1, 2016), was an American operatic soprano from Newark, New Jersey, who had an active international career from the 1940s through the 1980s. In 1954 she portrayed the Young Woman in the world premiere of Gian Carlo Menotti's The Saint of Bleecker Street. From 1988 to 1996 she taught on the voice faculty at the Manhattan School of Music in New York.

Carron was a regular performer at the New York City Opera from 1958 to 1973 where her roles included Anna Maurrant in Kurt Weill's Street Scene, Birdie Hubbard in Marc Blitzstein’s Regina, Cio-Cio San in Madama Butterfly Cook in The Nightingale, Foreign Woman in The Consul, Liu in Turandot, Mimì in La bohème, Virgin in Arthur Honegger's Joan of Arc at the Stake, and the title role in Suor Angelica. Her final performance with the company was in October 1973 as Cio-Cio San.

In 1958 Carron portrayed Glauce opposite Maria Callas in the title role of Luigi Cherubini's Medea at the Dallas Opera, and performed the role of Liu opposite Birgit Nilsson's Turandot and Richard Tucker's Prince Calaf at the New Orleans Opera. She also sang Liu for her debuts with the Philadelphia Lyric Opera Company in 1959 and the Houston Grand Opera in 1960. In 1962 she made her debut at the San Francisco Opera as Constanze in The Abduction from the Seraglio. Over the next several seasons she sang Cio-Cio San for her debut with several opera companies, including the Detroit Opera, the Cincinnati Opera, and the Caracas Opera.

Carron also sang leading roles at the Edinburgh Festival in Scotland, the Washington National Opera, and in Tokyo. She lived in New York City with her husband, Marte Previti, a chemical engineer, with whom she had two daughters and one grandson.

She died on December 1, 2016, at the age of 94.
