= BBC's 100 Greatest Television Series of the 21st Century =

2021 list of television series voted to be the best of the 21st century

The 100 Greatest TV Series of the 21st Century is a list compiled in October 2021 by the British Broadcasting Corporation (BBC), as part of their annual critics' poll, chosen by a voting poll of 206 television experts (critics, journalists, academics and industry figures) from 43 countries.

== Statistics ==
It was compiled by collating the top ten series submitted by the experts who were asked to list the best series that began airing since the year 2000.

Television programmes that began in the 20th century but continued airing in the 21st century were not eligible for inclusion (e.g. Doctor Who, SpongeBob SquarePants, South Park, Buffy the Vampire Slayer and The Sopranos), though Twin Peaks: The Return (#13) was eligible due to it being commissioned as a stand-alone miniseries as opposed to a revival of the original 1990–91 series. The list includes two programmes that debuted in 2000, the start point of the period included in the criteria: Curb Your Enthusiasm (#21) and Gilmore Girls (#72). The list includes two programmes, both of them a miniseries / limited series, that debuted in 2021, the year the list was compiled: The Underground Railroad (#59) and Mare of Easttown (#66).

Breaking Bad (#3) and The Good Wife (#33) are the only programmes to also have spin-off series place on the list, with Better Call Saul (#23) and The Good Fight (#47), respectively.

Only 7 programmes did not fall under the scripted live action genre: four animated shows — BoJack Horseman (#11), Avatar: The Last Airbender (#61), Rick and Morty (#76) and Steven Universe (#99); and three non-fiction shows — the reality competition series RuPaul's Drag Race (#67) plus the non-fiction docuseries Planet Earth (#73) and the Academy Award-winning O.J.: Made in America (#81).

Damon Lindelof is the creator with the most programmes on the list, with three: The Leftovers (#7), Lost (#19) and Watchmen (#26).

The majority of shows on the list come from the United Kingdom and United States, followed by: three from Denmark (including one co-production with Sweden); two each from France and Germany; and one each from Canada, Ireland, Italy, and Spain.

== Process ==
BBC Culture asked 206 television experts from around the world to rank the ten television programs produced in the twenty-first century that they considered the greatest. Participants were permitted to choose from titles released between January 2000 to July 2021 (when all responses were collected). Each program listed in these responses was then given points based on their ranking. If a program was ranked first in a critic's list, that program would get ten points, whereas the one ranked in tenth place would get one point. The list features three ties: Downton Abbey and Band of Brothers for the 36th-place ranking; The Good Place and Pose for the 62nd-place ranking and Narcos and Normal People for the 84th-place ranking.

A total of 206 critics from 43 countries participated in the poll, with the largest number (52) from the United Kingdom, followed by 29 from the United States. Out of the 206, 104 are men, 100 are women, and two are non-binary.

== Top 10 ==
Rank	Name of television series	Creator(s)	Year of premiere	Year of latest episode	Network	Country
1.	The Wire	David Simon	2002	2008	HBO	United States
2.	Mad Men	Matthew Weiner	2007	2015	AMC	United States
3.	Breaking Bad	Vince Gilligan	2008	2013	AMC	United States
4.	Fleabag	Phoebe Waller-Bridge	2016	2019	BBC Three (S1); BBC One (S2)	United Kingdom
5.	Game of Thrones	David Benioff and D.B. Weiss	2011	2019	HBO	United States
6.	I May Destroy You	Michaela Coel	2020	2020	BBC One	United Kingdom
7.	The Leftovers	Damon Lindelof	2014	2017	HBO	United States
8.	The Americans	Joe Weisberg	2013	2018	FX	United States
9.	The Office (UK)	Ricky Gervais and Stephen Merchant	2001	2003	BBC Two (S1-S2); BBC One (specials)	United Kingdom
10.	Succession	Jesse Armstrong	2018	2023	HBO	United States

== See also ==
- Quality television
- Golden Age of Television (2000s–present)
- BBC's 100 Greatest Films of the 21st Century
- BBC's 100 Greatest Foreign-Language Films
