= Robert Smith (American actor) =

American actor (1912–2001)

- Born: Robert Cecil Smith; December 15, 1912; Brooklyn, New York, U.S.
- Died: June 26, 2001 (aged 88); Brooklyn, New York, U.S.
- Years active: 1927–1949

Robert Cecil Smith (December 15, 1912 – June 26, 2001) was an American actor known for his work on stage, television, and film.

== Career ==
Smith appeared in stage plays and musicals throughout the United States.

A Variety review for Gramercy Ghost said, "Robert Smith squeezes the maximum in laughs from his role of the strait-laced fiance who is continually in hot water from one source or another". Another Variety review for noted that he had "helpful drive and conviction" and a Billboard review by Bob Francis noted, "Robert Smith does well as the stock-written money man who naturally loses out in the love sweepstakes".

He also received positive attention for his role in The Girl in Pink Tights. Bob Francis of The Billboard again noted that Smith was one of the production's "solid contributors". Variety noted, "Robert Smith plays the financial angel in good fashion".

Variety positively reviewed his performance in Auntie Mame.

Smith and Gus Becker, a former Stork Club waiter, opened a restaurant called the Coat of Arms in New York in January 1958. A farewell party for actress Rosalind Russell was held there when she left the stage production of Auntie Mame.

== Broadway credits ==
- Lost Horizons (1934)
- You Never Know (1938)
- One for the Money (1939)
- Two for the Show (1940)
- Gramercy Ghost (1951)
- The Girl in Pink Tights (1954)
- Auntie Mame as Beauregard Jackson Pickett Burnside

== Partial filmography ==
- Baby Brother (1927) – Tunney
- The Apache Raider (1928) – 'Beaze' La Mare
- Sunny Side Up (1929) – Little Boy (uncredited)
- Hit the Saddle (1937) – Hank, McGowan's henchmen (uncredited)
- Parachute Battalion (1941) – Private
- Father Takes a Wife (1941) – George, Junior's Driver (uncredited)
- Man-I-Cured (1941) – Leon's Nephew
- The Gay Falcon (1941) – Policeman Outside Morgue (uncredited)
- Four Jacks and a Jill (1942) – Joe – Press Agent (uncredited)
- Call Out the Marines (1942) – Billy Harrison
- Obliging Young Lady (1942) – Charles 'Charlie' Baker
- Framing Father (1942) – Reporter
- The Falcon Takes Over (1942) – Police Officer (uncredited)
- The Mayor of 44th Street (1942) – Eddie, the House Manager (uncredited)
- Criminal Court (1946) – Officer Doyle – Homicide (uncredited)
- Motor Maniacs (1946)
- On the Town (1949) – Spectator (uncredited)
