= Luigi Bartolini =

Italian painter

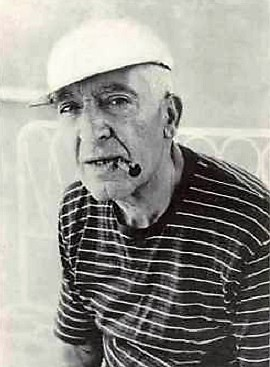

Luigi Bartolini (8 February 1892 – 16 May 1963) was an Italian painter, writer, and poet. He is known for his novel, Bicycle Thieves, upon which the Italian neorealist film directed by Vittorio De Sica and of the same title was based. He published over 70 books during his lifetime. His work was also part of the painting event in the art competition at the 1948 Summer Olympics.

== Exhibitions and awards ==
- 1928 – First participation in the Venice Biennale
- 1932 – Italian engraving exhibition – 1st Prize
- 1935 – 1st Rome Quadriennale – 1st Prize for engraving
- 1939 – 2nd Rome Quadrienniale – 1st Prize for engraving
- 1942 – XXII Venice Biennale – Personal room and 1st prize for engraving
- 1950 – Lugano International Award – 1st prize
- 1951 – Solo exhibition at the Silvagni gallery in Paris
- 1952 – Personal exhibition at the National Chalcography in Rome
- 1952 – XXVI Venice Biennale – Engraving Award
- 1953 – Personal exhibition in Brussels at the Royal Library of Belgium
- 1953 – Chianciano Prize for poetry with the book "Pianete"
- 1954 – Marzotto Prize for literature with D. Buzzati
- 1956 – Marzotto prize for painting
- 1956 – III Bienniale of Engraving in Venice – Prize of the Presidency of the Council
- 1960 – He was appointed Academician of San Luca
- 1962 – XXXI Venice Biennale – Personal room
- 1962 – Personal exhibition at the National Chalcography in Rome
- 1965 – IX Rome Quadrienniale – Personal room

== Works ==
=== Novels ===
- 1930 – Passeggiata con la ragazza – Ed. Vallecchi- Firenze
- 1930 – Il ritorno sul Carso – Ed. Mondadori- Milano
- 1931 – Il molino della carne – Ed. Bompiani- Milano
- 1933 – L'orso ed altri amorosi capitoli – Ed. Vallecchi- Firenze
- 1940 – Follonica ed altri 14 capitoli di umore amoroso – Ed. Emiliano degli Orfini- Genova
- 1942 – Il cane scontento ed altri racconti – Ed. Tuminelli- Roma
- 1943 – Vita di Anna Stikler racconti e acqueforti – Ed. Tuminelli- Roma
- 1946 – Ladri di biciclette – Ed. Polin – Roma
- 1948 – Ladri di biciclette 2a edizione – Ed. Longanesi- Milano
- 1945 – Ragazza caduta in città – Ed. Il Solco- Città di Castello
- 1949 – Amata dopo – Ed. Nistri Lischi- Pisa
- 1951 – Il mezzano Alipio – Ed.Vallecchi- Firenze
- 1954 – Signora Malata di cuore – Vallecchi- Firenze
- 1955 – Antinoo o l'efebo dal naso a becco di civetta- Ed. Porfiri – Roma
- 1955 – Castelli Romani – Ed. Cappelli – Bologna
- 1957 – Tre prose d'arte – Il sodalizio del libro – Venezia
- 1959 – La pettegola ed altri racconti – Ed. Cappelli – BOlogna
- 1960 – Le acque del Basento – Ed. Mondadori – Milano
- 1960 – Passeggiata con la ragazza nuova edizione – Ed. Mondadori – Milano
- 1962 – L'antro di Capelvenere – Ed. Istituto d'arte – Urbino
- 1963 – Racconti scabrosi – Ed. Scheiwiller – Milano

=== Poetry ===
- 1924 – Il guanciale – Ed. Merat – Parigi
- 1924 – Il guanciale – Ed. IL pensiero contemporaneo – Torino
- 1931 – La vita dei morti – Ed. Campitelli – Foligno
- 1939 – Poesie 1928-1938 – Ed. La Modernissima – Roma
- 1941 – Poesie ad Anna Stikler – Ed. Il Cavallino – Venezia
- 1942 – Scritti d'eccezione – Ed. IL Campano – Pisa
- 1944 – Poesie e satire – Ed. D.O.C. – Roma
- 1948 – Liriche e polemiche – Ed- Nistri Lischi – Pisa
- 1953 – Pianete – Ed. Vallecchi – Firenze
- 1953 – Poesie per Anita e Luciana – Ed. Scheiwiller – Milano
- 1953 – Addio ai sogni – Ed. Scheiwiller – Milano
- 1953 – Ombre fa le metope – Ed. Schwarz – Milano
- 1954 – Dodici Poesie di Luigi Bartolini – Ed. Malaria – Follonica
- 1954 – Poesie 1954 – Ed. Vallecchi – Firenze
- 1958 – Al padre ed altri poemetti – Ed. Miano – Milano
- 1959 – Il Mazzetto – Ed. MOndadori – Milano
- 1960 – Poesie 1960 – Ed. Bucciarelli – Ancona
- 1961 – 13 Canzonette – Ed. Scheiwiller – Milano
- 1963 – L'eremo dei frati bianchi – Ed. Bucciarelli – Ancona
- 1963 – Testamento per Luciana – Ed. Bucciarelli – Ancona

== See also ==
- Verzocchi collection
