= Labyrinth (opera) =

Opera by Gian Carlo Menotti

- Television opera by Gian Carlo Menotti
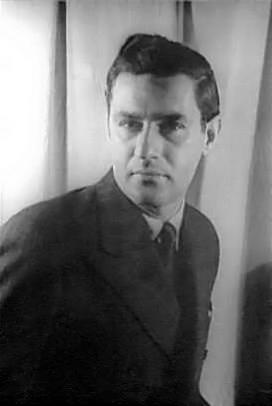
- The composer in 1944
- Librettist: Menotti
- Language: English
- Premiere: March 3, 1963; NBC Opera Theatre

Labyrinth is an opera in one act by composer Gian Carlo Menotti. The work was commissioned for television by the NBC Opera Theatre and uses an English language libretto by the composer. Unlike Menotti's previous television operas, such as Amahl and the Night Visitors, this opera was written with no intention of being moved to live stage performance later. Menotti intended for this work to utilize the special effects unique to television which could not be recreated in live theatre. As a result, NBC's television production of the opera was the only performance the work had received until Ventura College mounted a production in June 2020, directed by Brent Wilson. After its March 3, 1963 broadcast the opera was mainly criticized by the press for its trite use of allegory and music which rejected the avant-garde in favour of romanticism. Critic Harold C. Schonberg stated in his review in The New York Times that,

"Menotti falls back on the procedures he has always used: the scraps of canonic imitation, the stretches of parlando, the Puccini like melodies, the banal waltz themes... [It] ended up an allegory that had all the dimension of a Mobius strip: an example of slick television and cinema of the 1960s wedded pretty much to music of the 1890s... On the whole Labyrinth is one of the thinnest musical concoctions Menotti has ever put together.

However, Schonberg did praise the quality of both the acting and singing given by the performers. The cast included John Reardon as The Bridegroom, Judith Raskin as The Bride, Elaine Bonazzi as The Spy, Robert White as The Old Chess Player, Beverly Wolff as The executive director, Bob Rickner as The Executive Director's Secretary, Frank Porretta as The Astronaut, Leon Lishner as Death, John West as Death's Assistant, Nikiforos Naneris as The Bellboy, and Eugene Green as The Italian Opera Singer. Kirk Browning directed the production with Herbert Grossman serving as conductor, Noel Taylor as costume designer, and Warren Clymer as set designer.
