= The Girl in Pink Tights =

1954 Broadway musical (and canceled film)

The Girl in Pink Tights is a musical comedy with music by Sigmund Romberg; lyrics by Leo Robin; and a musical book by Jerome Chodorov and Joseph Fields. The musical opened on Broadway on March 5, 1954 at the Mark Hellinger Theatre where it ran for a total of 115 performances until it closed on June 12, 1954.

The production was produced and directed by Shepard Traube (1907–1983), choreographed by Agnes De Mille, used set and light designs by Eldon Elder, costume designs by Miles White, and conducted by musical director Sylvan Levin. The cast was led by Charles Goldner as Maestro Gallo, Zizi Jeanmaire as Lisette Gervais, David Atkinson as Clyde Hallam, Alexandre Kalioujny as Volodya Kuzentsov, Brenda Lewis as Lotta Leslie, Robert Smith as Van Beuren, and David Aiken as Eddington.

Composer Romberg died before completing the full score; however his frequent orchestrator, Don Walker, was able to develop some sketches and musical ideas left of the unfinished songs.

A planned film version was cancelled after Marilyn Monroe refused the role in defiance of her studio contract. The actress called it "trash" and she was also to be paid less than a third as much as her co-star, Frank Sinatra.
