= BBC's 100 Greatest Foreign-Language Films =

2018 list of international films voted to be the best

BBC's 100 Greatest Foreign Language Films is a list compiled in 2018 by BBC Culture, as part of their annual critics' poll.

== Selection criteria ==
BBC Culture polled 209 film critics from 43 countries, asking them to submit their list of the 10 greatest foreign-language movies (i.e. not in English). As with other BBC Culture 100 Greatest polls, the ranking was established by a point system: ten points awarded to the film ranked first, nine to the film ranked second and so forth.

== Criticism ==
Writing for Vanity Fair, K. Austin Collins lamented the predictability of the list - "heavy on works from Europe and East Asia; low on women; low on avant garde and documentary filmmaking" - and the absence of popular genres such as Nollywood, Bollywood or Giallo, arguing that "a truly worthy list of this nature wouldn’t be so snobby about high and low culture. It’d be a glorious, messy mix of arthouse and pop, as any list about the greatest art—rather than the greatest textbook art—should be."

== Partial list ==
No.	Title	Director	Country	Original language	Year
1	Seven Samurai	Akira Kurosawa	Japan	Japanese	1954
2	Bicycle Thieves	Vittorio De Sica	Italy	Italian	1948
3	Tokyo Story	Yasujirō Ozu	Japan	Japanese	1953
4	Rashomon	Akira Kurosawa	Japan	Japanese	1950
5	The Rules of the Game	Jean Renoir	France	French	1939
6	Persona	Ingmar Bergman	Sweden	Swedish	1966
7	8½	Federico Fellini	Italy, France	Italian	1963
8	The 400 Blows	François Truffaut	France	French	1959
9	In the Mood for Love	Wong Kar-wai	Hong Kong, France	Cantonese	2000
10	La Dolce Vita	Federico Fellini	Italy, France	Italian, English, French, German	1960

== See also ==
- BBC's 100 Greatest Films of the 21st Century
- BBC's 100 Greatest Television Series of the 21st Century
