= Nicola Rossi-Lemeni =

Italian opera singer

- Nicola Rossi Lemeni (photo with 1946 dedication)
- Born: November 6, 1920; Istanbul, Turkey
- Died: March 12, 1991 (aged 70); Bloomington, Indiana, United States
- Occupations: Opera singer, professor
- Spouse: Virginia Zeani

Nicola Rossi-Lemeni (Note: His father's last name was Rossi, but his mother wanted her family name added, "Rossi Lemeni" (without a hyphen). However, many publications and recordings hyphenate the name.) (November 6, 1920 – March 12, 1991), was an operatic bass of mixed Italian-Russian parentage.

Rossi-Lemeni was born in Istanbul, Ottoman Empire, the son of an Italian colonel and a Russian mother. In his prime, he was one of the most respected bassos in Italy. The composer Ildebrando Pizzetti wrote the opera Assassinio nella cattedrale (1958) specifically for Rossi-Lemeni. He was also a prize-winning poet and a painter. Late in his career, he was a well-respected teacher.

== Career ==
Nicola Rossi Lemeni in Giulio Cesare, Teatro alla Scala, 1956-1957

The basso made his debut as Varlaam in Boris Godunov at La Fenice, Venice, in 1946. He sang at the Teatro alla Scala from 1947 to 1972, the Teatro Colón (1949) and Covent Garden (1952). He appeared at the Metropolitan Opera, opening the 1953/54 season, in Faust (with Jussi Björling, Victoria de los Ángeles and Robert Merrill, conducted by Pierre Monteux and directed by Peter Brook in his Met debut), followed by the title roles of Don Giovanni and Boris Godunov.

He sang Don Giovanni to open the newly established Lyric Theatre of Chicago in February 1954 (renamed two years later as Lyric Opera of Chicago), and returned that fall for Norma with Callas in her American debut, and Basilio in The Barber of Seville. The following season he appeared in Puritani with Callas, Boheme with Tebaldi, Faust with Björling, Elisir with Carteri, and L'amore dei tre re with Kirsten.

He created the roles of Thomas Beckett in Assassinio nella cattedrale (Murder in the Cathedral) by Ildebrando Pizzetti (based on the T.S. Eliot play), and Eddie Carbone in Uno sguardo dal ponte (A View from the Bridge) by Renzo Rossellini (based on the Arthur Miller play).

Rossi-Lemeni was married to Romanian soprano Virginia Zeani. Among his recordings are Don Carlos (with Mirto Picchi, 1951), The Barber of Seville (with de los Ángeles, 1952), and—opposite Maria Callas—I puritani (1953), Norma (1954), Il turco in Italia (1954), La forza del destino (1954) and Anna Bolena (1957). He was then featured in two recordings of La serva padrona, the first (1955) conducted by Carlo Maria Giulini, the second (1959) alongside Zeani.

In 1952, he recorded excerpts from Boris Godunov with Leopold Stokowski and the San Francisco Symphony for RCA Victor, which have been reissued on CD.

Rossi-Lemeni joined the faculty of Indiana University’s Jacobs School of Music in 1980, teaching there until his death in 1991.

Rossi-Lemeni was a pontifical knight in the Order of St. Sylvester. He died in Bloomington, Indiana.
