= Gerardo Guerrieri =

Italian screenwriter

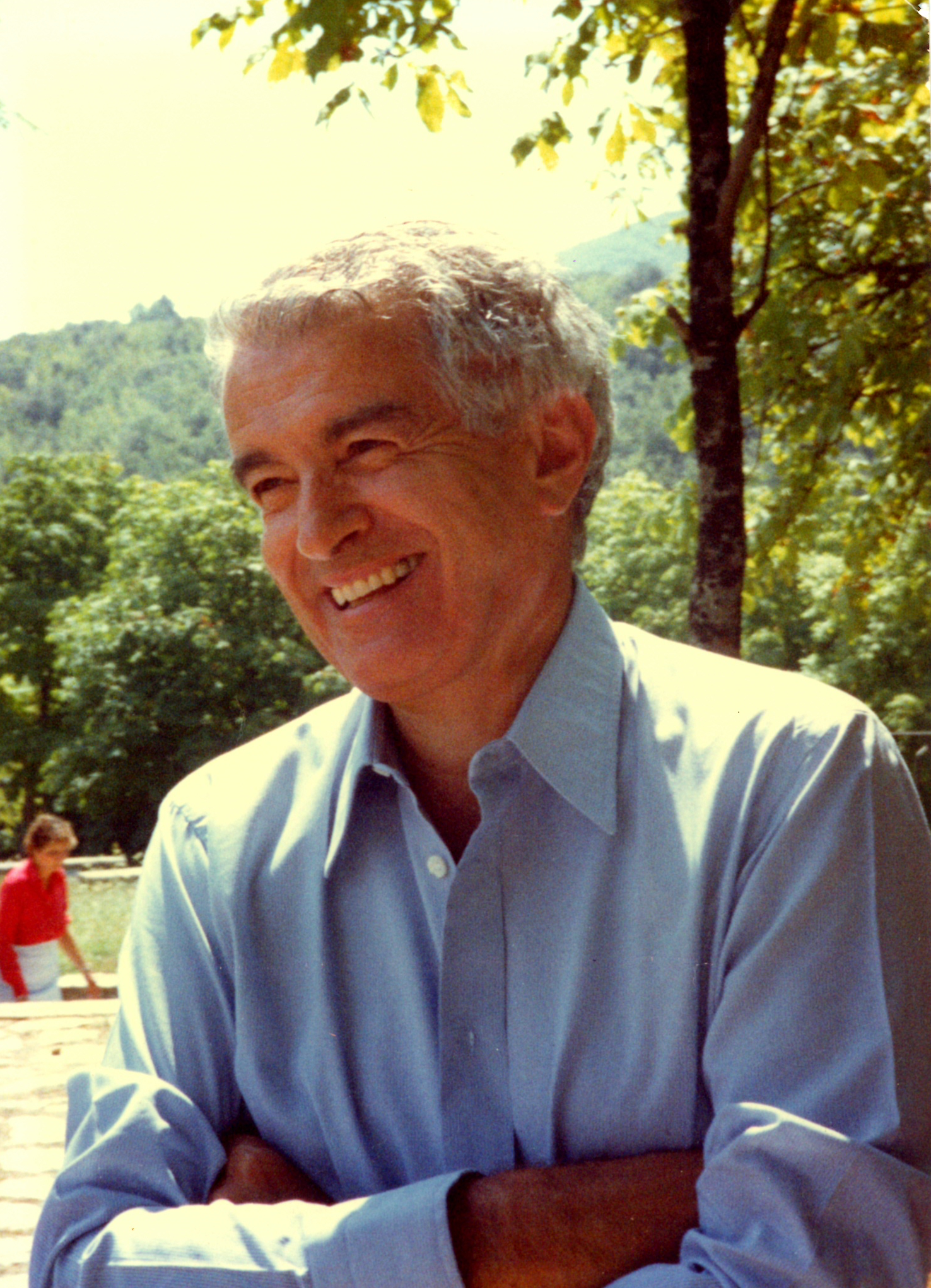
Gerardo Guerrieri in Monteluco di Spoleto (1981)

Gerardo Guerrieri (4 February 1920 in Matera – 24 April 1986 in Rome) was an Italian film director, playwright, screenwriter, translator, theater critic, and essayist. He is particularly remembered for translating numerous plays into the Italian language, including works by Anton Chekhov, Arthur Miller, Tennessee Williams, August Strindberg, Eugene O'Neill, William Saroyan and William Shakespeare among others. His own works were avant-garde in design. He was notably the librettist for Renzo Rossellini's 1961 opera Uno sguardo dal ponte.
