= Regina (Blitzstein) =

1949 opera by Marc Blitzstein

Regina is an opera by Marc Blitzstein, to his own libretto based on the play The Little Foxes by Lillian Hellman. It was completed in 1948 and premiered the next year. Blitzstein chose this source in order to make a strong statement against capitalism. In three acts, the musical style has been described as new American verismo, abounding in the use of spirituals, Victorian parlour music, dance forms, ragtime, aria and large, symphonic score.

Borrowing from both opera and Broadway styles, in a manner similar to Leonard Bernstein in Trouble in Tahiti and Virgil Thomson in Four Saints in Three Acts, Regina has been said to straddle the line between entertainment and so-called serious music. Hellman gave Blitzstein considerable advice and strongly objected to any departures from the play's structure. Blitzstein planned an elaborate choral prologue, but Hellman convinced him to shorten and finally jettison it. Before the premiere, producer Cheryl Crawford insisted on still further cuts to the opera, asking Blitzstein to reduce the work from three acts to two. He did so, cutting fifteen minutes of music out of the party scene. Leonard Bernstein described Regina's relationship to The Little Foxes as "coating the wormwood with sugar, and scenting with magnolia blossoms the cursed house".

== Performance history and versions ==
Regina premiered on Broadway at the 46th Street Theatre in New York on October 31, 1949, conducted by Maurice Abravanel and directed by Bobby Lewis with choreography by Anna Sokolow. Jane Pickens, formerly of the pop trio the Pickens Sisters, played Regina, and Brenda Lewis was Birdie. The first production received mixed reviews and closed on December 17, 1949.

In 1953, the City Centre Opera produced a different version of the opera with greatly expanded orchestration, giving the work a more "operatic" rather than "Broadway" sound. Bobby Lewis directed again, using the same sets. Brenda Lewis, Birdie in the 1949 cast, now took the lead as Regina. The 1953 production restored the party scene but cut other material. This production was a success, leading the company to revive the work again in 1958, with still more cuts. The 1958 version completely eliminated the onstage Dixieland band that had been an essential part of Blitzstein's plan for the work. The 1958 version, which was Hellman's favorite although furthest from the composer's intentions, was recorded.

The first major revival of Regina since the 1958 production was in 1977 in Detroit by the Michigan Opera Theatre with John Yaffé as conductor, directed by Frank Rizzo, designed by Franco Colavecchia, choreographed by Grethe Barrett Holby. It was again produced in 1980, by the Houston Grand Opera with Elisabeth Carron as Birdie. Wolf Trap Opera Company mounted a production in the temporary Meadow Center in August 1982 after the Filene Center burned down in April, in which a young Bruce Ford was featured as Leo.

The first British performance was produced in Glasgow in 1991 by the Scottish Opera. New York City Opera revisited Regina in 1992 and cut music further from the 1959 version, which had come to be called definitive. The Scottish Opera production was released as a recording in 1992 by John Mauceri and the Scottish Opera Orchestra, with Katherine Ciesinski (replacing the original Regina, Katherine Terrell) and Samuel Ramey. This recording included nearly all the music written for the opera.

Robert L. Larsen of the Des Moines Metro Opera has championed the opera and produced it in 1994 and 2008. The Florida Grand Opera produced a new staging of the work in 2001, with Stewart Robertson conducting. Yet another version of the opera was mounted by Lyric Opera of Chicago in 2003, with much music restored but with many scenes involving the black servants deleted, as the well-intentioned portrayals of black characters had come to seem sentimental and patronizing. This last production also added lines of dialogue from Hellman's play to clarify the story. Pacific Opera Victoria in Victoria, British Columbia, and Long Leaf Opera in Chapel Hill, North Carolina, produced the opera in 2008. The Bronx Opera produced it in 2000 and 2016.

An out-of-print piano–vocal score of Regina was published by Chappell & Co. Subsequently, conductor John Mauceri and producer Tommy Krasker (then a student under Mauceri at Yale) worked with Blitzstein's collected papers at the State Historical Society of Wisconsin to reinstate music and dialogue excised earlier. That version became known as the "Scottish Opera Version" where it was premiered in 1991 and resulted in a new score published by Tams-Witmark.

== Roles ==
Roles, voice type, premiere cast
Role	Voice type	Premiere cast
Regina Giddens	mezzo-soprano	Jane Pickens
Alexandra "Xan" Giddens, her daughter	soprano	Priscilla Gillette
Horace Giddens, her husband	bass	William Wilderman
Ben Hubbard, her elder brother	baritone	George Lipton
Oscar Hubbard, her younger brother	baritone	David Thomas
Addie, the Giddens' housekeeper	contralto	Lillyn Brown
Cal, the Giddens' house man	baritone	William Warfield
"Birdie" Hubbard, Oscar's wife	soprano	Brenda Lewis
Leo Hubbard, Oscar's son	tenor	Russell Nype
William Marshall, a businessman from the North	tenor	Donald Clarke
Jazz, trumpeter in the Angel Band	baritone	William Dillard
Belle	silent role	Clarise Crawford

== Synopsis ==
Setting: the Deep South in the year 1900

Regina Giddens schemes with her brothers Ben and Oscar for money and power. When her crippled husband Horace opposes her plans, Regina denies him his heart medication and he dies of a heart attack. Their daughter Alexandra, realizing the true cause of Horace's death, finds the strength to leave her mother. Having double-crossed her brothers as well, Regina is left wealthy but alone.

== Musical numbers ==
Musical highlights include the following:

- "Stand where the angels stand", prologue
- "Music, music, music" sung by Birdie, act 1
- "The Best Thing of All" sung by Regina, act 1
- "What will it be for me?" sung by Alexandra, act 1
- "Regina does a lovely party", act 2
- "Night Could Be Time to Sleep" (Blues) sung by Addie, act 2
- "Make a quiet day/Consider the rain" (Rain Quartet), act 3
- Birdie's Aria ("Lionnet"), act 3
- "Greedy Girl" sung by Ben, act 3

== Recordings ==
Year	Cast (Regina, Birdie, Alexandra, Addie, Leo, Ben, Oscar, Cal, Horace)	Conductor, opera house and orchestra	Label
1958	Brenda Lewis; Elisabeth Carron, Helen Strine, Carol Brice, Loren Driscoll, George S. Irving, Emile Renan, Andrew Frierson, Joshua Hecht	Samuel Krachmalnick, New York City Opera Orchestra and Chorus	CBS/Sony Records
1991	Katherine Ciesinski, Sheri Greenawald, Angelina Réaux, Theresa Merritt, David Kuebler, Timothy Noble, James Maddalena, Bruce Hubbard, Samuel Ramey	John Mauceri, Scottish Opera Orchestra and Chorus	Decca Records
