= Hit the Saddle =

1937 film by Mack V. Wright, George Blair

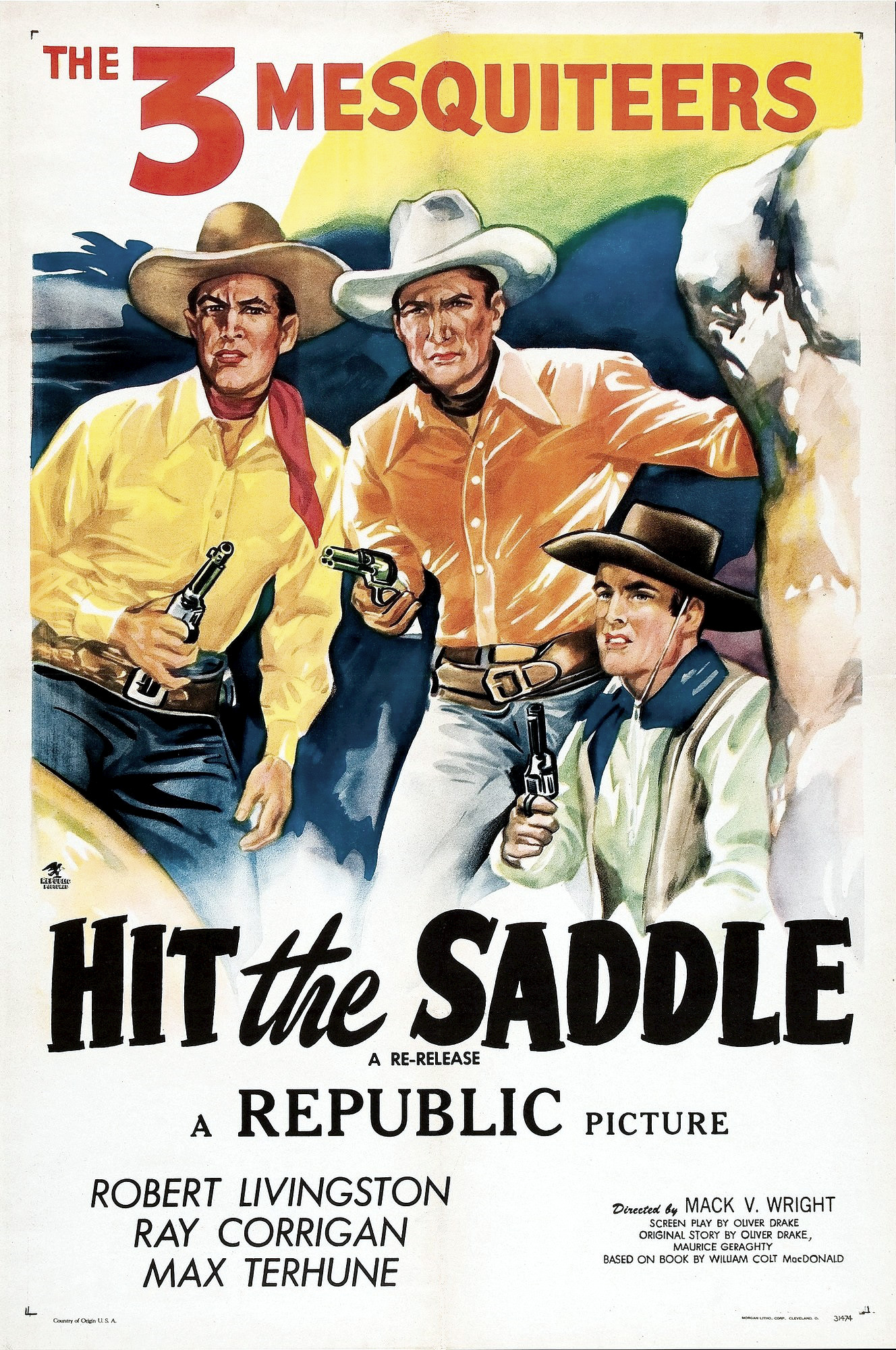
- Directed by: Mack V. Wright; George Blair (assistant)
- Written by: Oliver Drake; Maurice Geraghty; William Colt MacDonald (novel)
- Produced by: Nat Levine; Sol C. Siegel (associate)
- Starring: Bob Livingston; Ray "Crash" Corrigan; Max Terhune; Rita Hayworth; J. P. McGowan
- Cinematography: Jack A. Marta
- Edited by: Murray Seldeen (supervising); Tony Martinelli
- Music by: Alberto Colombo
- Distributed by: Republic Pictures
- Release date: March 3, 1937
- Running time: 57 minutes
- Country: United States
- Language: English

Hit the Saddle is a 1937 "Three Mesquiteers" Western B-movie starring Bob Livingston, Ray Corrigan, Max Terhune, and Rita Hayworth, before she became famous. It was second in The Three Mesquiteers series released by Republic Pictures. The film was directed by Mack V. Wright.

== Plot ==
A team of men that work for cattle rancher Rance McGowan attempt to capture a herd of wild horses on an Arizona wild horse refuge, but they are protected by the US government. The men are arrested by the sheriff and his men for the attempt. When Sheriff Miller confronts McGowan, he claims that he sent his men to look for some brood mares that he lost. McGowan has his men paint Volcano, his stallion, to disguise him as a pinto to infiltrate the wild horse herd in order to cause stampeding. After several stampedes cause crop damage, injury and one death, the other ranchers go to Sheriff Miller for help. Miller and the Three Mesquiteers go in search of the pinto that they feel is causing the wild horses to stampede. Meanwhile McGowan's men are initiating another stampede, using Volcano, which causes Miller's horse to stumble and fall, throwing Miller off his horse injuring him. Before Miller has the chance to move out of the way Volcano stomps on him, killing him.

After Sheriff Miller's death, the ranchers petition government officials to revoke the protection of the wild horses. McGowan and his men get ready for a wild horse drive so they can sell the horses. Tucson is then made sheriff, and the Three Mesquiteers head out to find the pinto that's causing the stampedes but after capturing the wild pinto they discover it's never been shod, however it was apparent that the horse that horse that killed Miller was wearing horseshoes. The ranchers are adamant that the pinto be put down, even though Stony disagrees with the decision and tries to prove the pinto is not a killer by going into the horse stall with the pinto.

Rita has talked Stony into marrying her and convinces Stony to get married that day. She invites everyone to come to their wedding reception that will be held later that day. Tucson and Lullaby are against the wedding and initially agree to stay out of it, then Lullaby offers Rita money to break it off with Stony and leave for New York. Stony realizes they interfered and storms off.

Stony steals the pinto stallion, and as he is leading him away, McGowan offers to help Stony by throwing the posse off his trail and by hiding him and the pinto at his ranch. While there, Stony notices Volcano painted to look like a pinto and that he's controlled through a series of whistles. The McGowan's men then put Stony in the bunkhouse and wait for McGowan to get there. McGowan then informs Stony he will have to be killed.

Tucson and Lullaby get back to their own ranch just as the late Sheriff's young son, Tim, gets there. Tim informs the two men that he saw Stony leading the pinto towards McGowan's ranch. Tucson and Lullaby get back on their horses and head for McGowan's ranch.

The next day McGowan has his men tie up Stony, and they tether the wild pinto nearby in an effort to make it look like the pinto killed Stony. One of the men whistle for Volcano to trample Stony to death, but the pinto breaks free and begins to fight with Volcano. The pinto wards off Volcano and chases him away. All but two of McGowan's men follow the two horses. Tucson and Lullaby spot the two men guarding Stony and jump on them from a nearby ledge and untie Stony. Stony informs them that McGowan's killer stallion is painted to look like a pinto. After McGowan's men capture Volcano they attack the Three Mesquiteers, McGowan attempts to escape by riding away on Volcano. Stony whistles, and Volcano bucks McGowan onto the ground and tramples McGowan. Stony and Tucson chase after the two remaining men and arrest them.

== Cast ==
- Bob Livingston as Stony Brooke, Mesquiteer
- Ray Corrigan as Tucson Smith, Mesquiteer
- Max Terhune as Lullaby Joslin, Mesquiteer
- Rita Hayworth as Rita, a saloon singer (Hayworth was billed under her real name as Rita Cansino; in the same year she moved to Columbia Pictures and acquired her more famous stage name)
- J. P. McGowan as Rance McGowan, villainous rancher
- Ed Cassidy as Sheriff Miller, murdered by McGowan
- Sammy McKim as Tim Miller, the Sheriff's son
- Yakima Canutt as Buck, one of McGowan's henchmen
- Harry Tenbrook as Joe Harvey, one of McGowan's henchmen
- Robert Smith as Hank, one of McGowan's henchmen
- Eddie Boland as Pete
