= Carry Nation (opera) =

Opera by Douglas Moore

- Opera by Douglas Moore
- Librettist: W. N. Jayme
- Language: English
- Based on: Life of Carrie Nation
- Premiere: March 28, 1966; University of Kansas Hall

Carry Nation is an opera in a prologue and two acts by American composer Douglas Moore which is based on the life of temperance activist Carrie Nation, who sometimes spelled her first name "Carry". The work uses an English-language libretto by W. N. Jayme.

The opera was commissioned by the University of Kansas in commemoration of the school's 100th anniversary. The premiere performance was given at KU's Murphy Hall on March 28, 1966 with a cast headlined by four professional opera singers brought in for the event, and the supporting cast supplied by KU's music and theatre students. Lewin Goff staged the production and Robert Baustian conducted. The opera was subsequently given its first professional production at the San Francisco Opera in June 1966 under the baton of Herbert Grossman. The New York City Opera mounted the first New York production in March 1968 and released a recording of the work in 1969. All three of these initial stagings and the recording starred mezzo-soprano Beverly Wolff in the title role.
