= BBC's 100 Greatest Films of the 21st Century =

2016 list of films voted to be the best of the 21st century

The 21st Century's 100 greatest films is a list compiled in August 2016 by the BBC, chosen by a voting poll of 177 film critics from around the world.

It was compiled by collating the top ten films submitted by the critics who were asked to list the best films released since the year 2000.

== Selection criteria ==
BBC Culture asked 177 film critics from around the world to rank the ten films produced in the twenty-first century that they considered the greatest. Participants were permitted to choose from titles released between January 2000 to June 2016 (when all responses were collected). Participants focused primarily on Western films, as indicated by the minimal representation of Asian films, with no South Asian representation in the compiled list. Each film listed in these responses was then given points based on their ranking. If a film was ranked first in a critic's list, that film would get ten points, whereas the one ranked in tenth place would get one point. The list features 102 titles because of a tie occurring with Carlos, Requiem for a Dream, and Toni Erdmann for the 100th place ranking. With three films apiece, directors Apichatpong Weerasethakul, Christopher Nolan, Wes Anderson, Paul Thomas Anderson, Michael Haneke, and the Coen brothers have the greater number of titles on the list. Spirited Away was the highest ranked animated film at #4, and In the Mood for Love was the highest ranked non-English language film at #2 and Children of Men at #13 was the top film with British production input (the BBC being a British company). Only four films from the list have won the Academy Award for Best Picture: No Country for Old Men (2007), The Hurt Locker (2009), 12 Years a Slave (2013), and Spotlight (2015).

A total of 177 critics from 36 countries participated in the poll, and the largest number (81) was from the United States, followed by the United Kingdom. Out of the 177, 122 are men and 55 are women. Most participants are newspaper/magazine film reviewers, Internet film reviewers, academics, and cinema curators.

== Partial list ==
No.	Title	Director	Country	Year
1	Mulholland Drive	David Lynch	United States, France	2001
2	In the Mood for Love	Wong Kar-wai	Hong Kong, France	2000
3	There Will Be Blood	Paul Thomas Anderson	United States	2007
4	Spirited Away	Hayao Miyazaki	Japan	2001
5	Boyhood	Richard Linklater	United States	2014
6	Eternal Sunshine of the Spotless Mind	Michel Gondry	United States	2004
7	The Tree of Life	Terrence Malick	United States	2011
8	Yi Yi	Edward Yang	Taiwan, Japan	2000
9	A Separation	Asghar Farhadi	Iran	2011
10	No Country for Old Men	Joel Coen and Ethan Coen	United States	2007

== See also ==
- BBC's 100 Greatest Foreign-Language Films
- BBC's 100 Greatest Television Series of the 21st Century
