= David Aiken (baritone) =

American musician (1917–2011)

David Aiken (October 4, 1917 – July 23, 2011) was an American operatic baritone, opera director, and United States Army Air Forces officer. He was particularly associated with the works of Gian Carlo Menotti, and is best remembered for creating the role of King Melchior in the world premiere of Menotti's Amahl and the Night Visitors.

== Life and career ==
Born in Benton, Illinois, Aiken studied English at Southern Illinois Normal College, where he matriculated in 1935. While a student there he was a member of the university's choir and studied singing privately with Grace Duty in Marion, Illinois. After earning his diploma in 1939, he briefly worked as a high school English teacher and track coach before accepting a post with the St. Louis Municipal Opera. He left that position in 1942 to join the United States Army Air Forces, where he was trained as a fighter pilot and commissioned as a second lieutenant. He spent the remainder of World War II flying the Consolidated B-24 Liberator for missions in both Germany and Italy. He remained a reserve officer and command pilot in the Air Force with the rank of lieutenant colonel up through 1972.

After World War II, Aiken pursued further studies in music at the Jacobs School of Music of Indiana University Bloomington. Shortly after completing these studies, he made his debut on Broadway in May 1950 in the original production of Gian Carlo Menotti's The Consul; having replaced George Jongeyans as Mr. Kofner. After the show closed the following November, he and several of the other Broadway cast members took the show on tour for performances in Paris and London. He later returned to Broadway in March 1954 to create the role of Eddington in the original production of Sigmund Romberg's The Girl in Pink Tights. He left that show in June 1954 only to return to Broadway the following December to originate the role of Salvatore in the premiere of Menotti's The Saint of Bleecker Street.

After the critical success of The Consul, Menotti was invited by NBC to compose an opera for television which was to be performed by the newly created NBC Opera Theatre (NBCOT). What resulted was the highly successful Christmas opera Amahl and the Night Visitors which was premiered on Christmas Eve of 1951 in a national broadcast to millions. For this production, Menotti enlisted the forces of many of the singers from The Consul; including Aiken who was cast in the role of King Melchior. He continued to portray that role, along with the other original adult cast members, for annual live television broadcasts up through 1962. They also gave annual national tours of Amahl, performing with symphony orchestras in concerts throughout the United States.

In 1968 Aiken joined the voice faculty at the Indiana University Jacobs School of Music where he taught for many years. During the 1970s and 1980s he operated the David Aiken Touring Opera Company which presented annual tours of Amahl and the Night Visitors. Aiken directed the productions and continued to perform the role of King Melchior as well.

Aiken died in Linton, Indiana, at the age of 93.
