= Gloria Lane =

American opera singer

- Gloria Lane (photo with dedication)
- Occupation: mezzo-soprano opera singer

Gloria Lane Krachmalnick (June 6, 1925 – November 22, 2016) was an American operatic mezzo-soprano who had an active international performance career from 1949 to 1976. In her early career she distinguished herself by creating roles in the world premieres of two operas by Gian Carlo Menotti, the Secretary of the Consulate in The Consul (1950) and Desideria in The Saint of Bleecker Street (1954); both roles which she performed in successful runs on Broadway and on international tours. For her performance in The Consul she was awarded a Clarence Derwent Award and two Donaldson Awards.

Lane was also a regular performer at the New York City Opera from 1952 to 1960, and was heard as a guest artist with several important American opera companies during the 1950s. After 1960, Lane's career was primarily centered in Europe. She made appearances in leading roles at many of the most important European opera houses during the 1960s, including La Scala, The Royal Opera, and the Vienna State Opera among others. She was particularly admired for her portrayal of the title heroine in Georges Bizet's Carmen. In the 1970s she performed briefly as a dramatic soprano in performances at the Glyndebourne Festival, Hawaii Opera Theatre, and Vancouver Opera. After retiring from singing in 1977, she taught voice out of a private studio in Los Angeles.

== Early life and education ==
Born Gussie Siet in Trenton, New Jersey, Lane was the daughter of a junk dealer. In 1948, having had no formal voice training, she won the Philadelphia Inquirer's annual 'Voice of Tomorrow Contest'. Winning the contest enabled her to pursue vocal studies with Elizabeth Westmoreland in Philadelphia. In 1949 she won a scholarship to the Tanglewood Music Center where she made her debut with the Boston Symphony Orchestra performing the title role in scenes from Bizet's Carmen under director Boris Goldovsky.

== Early career ==
In 1950 Lane created the role of the Secretary of the Consulate in the world premiere of Gian Carlo Menotti's The Consul at the Shubert Theater in Philadelphia. She continued with the production when it moved to Broadway later that year where it enjoyed a successful eight-month run. She also performed the role in the UK at the Cambridge Theatre in February 1951 and in Paris at the Théâtre des Champs-Élysées in May 1951. For her performance as the Secretary of the Consulate she won the Clarence Derwent Award for best supporting actress in a musical role, and the Donaldson Awards for best supporting actress and best debut performance.

In 1954 Lane returned to Broadway to appear in another Menotti world premiere, creating the role of Desideria in the Pulitzer Prize winning The Saint of Bleecker Street. She also sang that role for her debut at La Scala in 1955.

Lane made her debut with the New York City Opera as the Secretary of the Consulate in 1952. She sang several more roles with the NYCO from 1952 to 1960, including Amneris in Aida, Annina in Der Rosenkavalier, Antonia's mother in The Tales of Hoffmann, Evadne in Troilus and Cressida, Maddalena in Rigoletto, the Mother in Amahl and the Night Visitors, Salud in La vida breve, and the title role Carmen. She sang the title role in L'incoronazione di Poppea with the American Opera Society in 1953. That same year she sang Carmen and Meg Page in The Merry Wives of Windsor at the Central City Opera. In 1957 she created the role of the Countess in the world premiere of Stanley Hollingsworth's La Grande Breteche which was commissioned for television by the NBC Opera Theatre (NBCOT). For other NBCOT television broadcasts she also portrayed Helene in War and Peace(1957), Maddalena in Rigoletto (1958), and Marina Mniszech in Boris Godunov (1961).

In 1957 Lane made her debut at the Deutsche Oper Berlin as Princess Eboli in Verdi's Don Carlo, where she was also heard that season as Ulrica in Verdi's Un ballo in maschera. In 1958 she returned to La Scala to sing Carmen before making her debuts at both the Glyndebourne Festival and the Edinburgh Festival as Baba the Turk in Stravinsky's The Rake's Progress. She also sang Carmen for her debuts at the Royal Opera House, Covent Garden and the San Francisco Opera in 1959, and for her debut at the Opera Company of Boston in 1960.

== International success ==
During the 1960s Lane's career was primarily based in Europe and Canada. Among the opera companies with whom she sang leading roles during this time were the Canadian Opera Company, the Grand Théâtre de Bordeaux, La Fenice, La Scala, Opéra National de Lyon, the Teatro Comunale di Bologna, the Teatro Giuseppe Verdi, the Teatro Massimo, Teatro Regio di Parma, Teatro Regio di Torino, the Vienna State Opera, and the Wexford Festival Opera among others. In 1961 she created the role of Beatrice in the world premiere of Renzo Rossellini's Uno sguardo dal ponte at the Teatro dell'Opera di Roma; a role she also sang for the opera's American premiere with the Philadelphia Lyric Opera Company in 1967. In 1968 she portrayed Desideria at the Festival dei Due Mondi in Spoleto.

== Later life and career ==
In the late 1960s, Lane's career had begun to dwindle in terms of the number of bookings. She attempted to revitalize her career by switching her fach to that of a dramatic soprano; beginning with Santuzza in Cavalleria rusticana with the Vancouver Opera in 1971. She was heard later that year at the Glyndebourne Festival in the title role of Strauss' Ariadne auf Naxos and as Lady Macbeth in Verdi's Macbeth. Although reviews of her performance were positive overall, she failed to elicit much more work after this point. In 1974 she gave her last performance in a staged production as Desdemona in Otello at the Hawaii Opera Theater. Her final notable project was a 1976 recording of Katerina Ismailova in Dmitri Shostakovich's Lady Macbeth of the Mtsensk District for RAI.

After retiring from the stage, Lane settled in Los Angeles where she taught voice out of a private studio. Her notable students included Pamela Scanlon, Christine Kelley, and Francis Liska. She was married to the late conductor Samuel Krachmalnick for 50 years. They lived in the Studio City neighborhood of Los Angeles.
