= Samuel Krachmalnick =

American conductor and music educator

Samuel Krachmalnick (1926, St. Louis – April 1, 2005, Burbank, California) was an American conductor and music educator. He first came to prominence as a conductor on Broadway during the 1950s, notably earning a Tony Award nomination for his work as the music director of the original production of Leonard Bernstein's Candide. He went on to work as a busy conductor of operas and symphony orchestras internationally during the 1960s and 1970s. He was particularly active in New York City, where he held conducting posts with the American Ballet Theatre, the Harkness Ballet, the Metropolitan Opera, and the New York City Opera. His later career was primarily devoted to teaching on the music faculties of the University of Washington and the University of California, Los Angeles.

== Early life and education ==
Born in St. Louis, Krachmalnick was a child prodigy and gave his first piano recital at the age of 8. He earned degrees from the Eastman School of Music and the Juilliard School, attending both schools on full scholarships. At Eastman he studied piano, French horn and music theory, and at Juilliard he studied conducting with Jean Morel. After graduating from Juilliard in 1952, he spent two more years at the school working as Morel's teaching fellow. He also studied conducting with Leonard Bernstein at Tanglewood.

== Conducting career ==
While at Juilliard, Krachmalnick began conducting concerts under the auspices of the International Society for Contemporary Music in 1951. In 1954 he won the Tanglewood Music Center's inaugural Koussevitsky Memorial Prize in conducting which was presented to him by Aaron Copland. That same year he served as associate music director under Thomas Schippers for the original Broadway production of Gian Carlo Menotti's The Saint of Bleecker Street; often serving as conductor in the pitt during the productions run. It was through this production that he met his wife of 50 years, mezzo-soprano Gloria Lane, who portrayed the role of Desideria.

In 1955, Krachmalnick conducted the world premiere of Marc Blitzstein's opera Reuben, Reuben in Boston. He returned to Broadway in 1956 to serve as music director and conductor for the original production of Bernstein's Candide for which he received a Tony Award nomination for Best Conductor and musical director in 1957. He also conducted the original Broadway cast recording of the work. In 1959 he returned to Broadway one last time to serve as music director for the short lived musical Happy Town.

Krachmalnick also held conducting posts with the American Ballet Theatre, the Boston Arts Festival, the Harkness Ballet, the Metropolitan Opera, the New York City Opera, the Symphony of the Air, and the Zürich Opera House. He also worked widely as a guest conductor at opera houses internationally, making appearances with the Cleveland Orchestra, Croatian National Theatre in Zagreb, the Teatro Carlo Felice, the Teatro dell'Opera di Roma, the Teatro di San Carlo, and the Teatro Regio di Torino among others. He also worked as a guest conductor with the Helsinki Philharmonic Orchestra, the National Symphony Orchestra, the Oslo Philharmonic, the Rotterdam Philharmonic Orchestra, Toronto Symphony Orchestra, Warsaw Philharmonic Orchestra, and the Zurich Symphony Orchestra among others.

For the years of 1966 to 1968, 1971, and 1974, he conducted in the Naumburg Orchestral Concerts, in the Naumburg Bandshell, Central Park, in the summer series.

== Work as an educator and later life ==
From 1971 to 1976, Krachmalnick served on the music faculty at the University of Washington where he directed the university symphony orchestra. In 1974 he conducted a UW student production of Carlisle Floyd's Markheim which was recorded and broadcast nationally on PBS. For his work he won three Emmy Awards.

From 1976 to 1991, Krachmalnick served as director of the opera theatre program and the symphony orchestra at the University of California, Los Angeles. While there he played an instrumental role in shifting the school's focus from training music teachers to a more performance oriented program. Some of the student productions he conducted at UCLA were the musicals Leave It to Jane and The Boys from Syracuse, and the opera Four Saints in Three Acts. He ended his career at UCLA with a lauded production of Candide in 1991. After leaving UCLA he continued to teach privately.

Krachmalnick appeared as an actor in two films in small roles, Die Laughing (1980) and Brain Donors (1992). He and his wife Gloria Lane lived in Studio City, Los Angeles. They had two children, Magda and Robert. He died of a heart attack at the age of 79.
