= Patricia Craig (soprano) =

American opera singer

- Born: Patricia Duncklee; July 21, 1947 (age 79); Long Island, New York
- Education: Ithaca College
- Occupations: operatic soprano voice teacher
- Years active: 1978–2010

Patricia Craig (née Duncklee; born July 21, 1947) is an American operatic soprano and voice teacher.

== Operatic career ==
Born Patricia Duncklee in Long Island, New York, she studied music education at Ithaca College, graduating in 1965. Craig gained her first critical vocal acclaim as a winner of the Metropolitan Opera National Council Auditions. Her performing career spans more than three decades of major roles in the leading opera houses of the world. She made her Metropolitan Opera debut in 1978 as Marenka in The Bartered Bride, under James Levine, in John Dexter's production. Met audiences heard her for the next twelve seasons in a variety of leading roles in operas, including Madama Butterfly, Dialogues of the Carmelites, La Bohème, and Aufstieg und Fall der Stadt Mahagonny. Craig is a specialist in Puccini and Verdi heroines whose other operatic credits include performances with New York City Opera; Teatro la Fenice in Venice, Italy; the Festival of Two Worlds in both Spoleto, Italy, and Charleston, South Carolina; L’Opéra de Marseilles; and the companies of Cincinnati, Miami, Baltimore, and Washington, D.C. Concert performances include Tchaikovsky's The Queen of Spades with the Boston Symphony Orchestra under Seiji Ozawa.

== Teaching career ==
Craig joined the New England Conservatory faculty in 1990, where she taught until retiring from there in 2010, when she became a member of the voice faculty of the San Francisco Conservatory of Music. Several of her students have gained recognition in national competitions; others are singing with major opera companies in the United States and abroad. Craig has studied and collaborated with prominent artists including Donald Craig, Marenka Gurevitch, Magda Olivero, James de Blasis, Henry Lewis, Jeffrey Tate, Diane Richardson, Joan Dornemann, Martin Katz, Warren Jones, Anton Coppola, and Julius Rudel.

In addition to her private voice studio in San Francisco and teaching masterclasses she has taught at the American Institute of Musical Studies (AIMS) in Graz, Austria, and the Bay Area Summer Opera Theater Institute (BASOTI), where she collaborated for many years with her late husband, the Wagnerian tenor and voice teacher Richard Cassilly. Craig serves as Founding Chairman of the Board of Overseers for Opera Boston, and advisor to Boston Lyric Opera, and the Bel Canto Institute. She has been a competition adjudicator for organizations including the Metropolitan Opera, the Baltimore Opera, and the Cincinnati College-Conservatory of Music.

== Sources ==
- Apone, Carl, "Met Soprano Patricia Craig Making Pittsburgh A Second Home", Pittsburgh Press, October 9, 1983, pp. G1 and G4
- New England Conservatory of Music, Biography: Patricia Craig
- Rich, Maria F. (ed,), "Craig, Patricia", Who's Who in Opera, Arno Press, 1976, p. 113. ISBN 0-405-06652-X
- San Francisco Conservatory of Music, Patricia Craig
- Tommasini, Anthony, Richard Cassilly, American Tenor, Dies at 70, New York Times, February 4, 1998
