= Rohan Joseph de Saram =

- Born: July 20, 1953
- Died: October 14, 2003 (aged 50)
- Genres: Classical
- Occupation(s): Pianist and Conductor
- Instrument: Piano

Rohan Joseph de Saram (20 July 1953 – 14 October 2003) was a Sri Lankan pianist and conductor.

Educated at Royal College, Colombo, Rohan went on to study at the Juilliard School of Music and studied conducting under Prof. Carl Bamberger.

He started his career with the American Philharmonic Orchestra, of which he later became its Music Director. He returned to Sri Lanka in 1990 on President R. Premadasa's invitation, and founded the Philharmonic Society of Sri Lanka. The Society was set up to serve as the parent of Opera Lanka which was intended to be the national opera company of Sri Lanka with a working partnership with Opera India. He died in Rome, Italy on 14 October 2003 from renal cell carcinoma.
