= Norman Loftis =

American poet, novelist and filmmaker

Norman Loftis (born 1943) is an American poet, novelist and filmmaker, whose work has focused on the African-American experience, including his own upbringing in Chicago's South Side.

== Works ==
Born in Chicago, Loftis graduated from Fisk University and earned graduate degrees from Columbia University. His first book of poems, Exiles and Voyages, was published in 1970 and was dedicated, "To my first friend, W.H. Auden.”

A later work, Black Anima, was published in 1973 by Liveright and describes an odyssey "from the Alamac Hotel on Upper Broadway through the underground of contemporary Europe to Queen Nefertiti's Egypt and back in search of black identity."

His films include Small Time (1990), which records lives of petty crime among young black men. His film Messenger (1994) tells the story of a bicycle courier in Manhattan. It is considered to be a remake of Vittorio De Sica's Bicycle Thieves.
