= Anton Guadagno =

Italian conductor

Anton Guadagno (2 May 1923 – 16 August 2002) was an Italian operatic conductor.

Born in Castellammare del Golfo, Italy, Anton Guadagno studied at the Vincenzo Bellini Conservatory in Palermo and the Accademia di Santa Cecilia in Rome. He worked with Herbert von Karajan while studying at the Salzburg Mozarteum, and won first prize for conducting in 1948 at the age of 25. Upon graduation, he conducted in South America and Mexico City, where he was music director of the Bellas Artes and formed a lasting relationship with Plácido Domingo. He made his American debut in 1952 at Carnegie Hall, and served as an assistant conductor at the Metropolitan Opera during the 1958–1959 season. He was also the music director of the Philadelphia Lyric Opera Company from 1966 to 1972. Starting in the 1970s, he worked for 30 years with the Wiener Staatsoper as resident conductor in the Italian repertoire. In 1984, Guadagno became principal conductor of the Palm Beach Opera, a position he held for the rest of his life.

Guadagno died in Vienna, Austria in 2002.
