= Raskolnikov (surname) =

Raskolnikov (masculine) or Raskolnikova (feminine) is a Russian surname derived from the religious term raskolnik. Alternative spellings include Raskolnikow and Raskolnikoff.

- Fyodor Raskolnikov, pseudonym of Fyodor Ilyin, Russian sailor, Bolshevik and diplomat
- Jonas Raskolnikov Christiansen, founder of the Norwegian black metal band Slavia
- Ripoff Raskolnikoff, singer
- Rodion Romanovich Raskolnikov, the fictional protagonist of the novel Crime and Punishment by Fyodor Dostoyevsky
