= The Saint of Bleecker Street =

Opera by Gian Carlo Menotti

- Opera by Gian Carlo Menotti
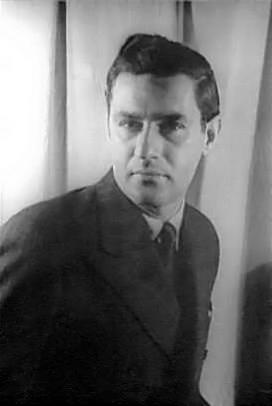
- The composer in 1944
- Librettist: Menotti
- Language: English
- Premiere: December 27, 1954; Broadway Theatre, New York

The Saint of Bleecker Street is an opera in three acts by Gian Carlo Menotti to an original English libretto by the composer. It was first performed at the Broadway Theatre in New York City on December 27, 1954. David Poleri and Davis Cunningham alternated in the role of Michele, and Thomas Schippers conducted. It ran for 92 consecutive performances.

The opera is through-composed, and set in the intensely Catholic Little Italy of New York City in 1954. It follows Annina, a young and simple woman who is blessed with the stigmata. She often hears voices and has visions of the angels. Her brother, Michele, is an agnostic who is intensely protective of his sister; he believes she requires hospitalization, but he cannot stop the rest of the neighborhood from believing her a saint.

The Saint of Bleecker Street won Menotti the Pulitzer Prize for Music in 1955 and the New York Drama Critics' Circle Award for Best Musical. Although it is not part of the standard operatic repertory, recordings of it exist, and it is occasionally performed.

External image
- George Tooker: The Subway (1950)

The original set for The Saint of Bleecker Street was designed by the American symbolic realist painter George Tooker, and was based on elements from his painting The Subway, currently in the collection of the Whitney Museum.

== Roles ==
Roles, voice types, premiere cast
Role	Voice type	Premiere cast Conductor: Thomas Schippers
Annina	soprano	Virginia Copeland
Don Marco	bass	Leon Lishner
Michele	tenor	David Poleri
Assunta	mezzo-soprano	Catherine Akos
Maria Corona	soprano	Maria Marlo
Desideria	mezzo-soprano	Gloria Lane
Salvatore	baritone	David Aiken
Carmela	soprano	Maria di Gerlando
A young man	tenor	Richard Cassilly
A young woman	soprano	Elisabeth Carron
1st guest	tenor	Keith Kaldenberg
2nd guest	baritone	John Reardon
Concettina	silent role	Lucy Becque
Maria's son	silent role	Ernesto Gonzales
Bartender	silent role	Russell Goodwin

== Synopsis ==
=== Act 1 ===
In her tenement on Bleecker Street, Annina has visions of Jesus Christ and wakes up to find stigmata on her hands ("Oh sweet Jesus, spare me this agony"). The neighbors and Don Marco, the neighborhood priest, believe that she is a saint with healing powers, but her protective brother Michele makes them leave and declares that her visions are simply the evidence of illness. Later, Annina sits outside with her friend Carmela, who shyly confesses that she intends to be married to Salvatore instead of taking the veil with Annina. Annina lovingly releases her from her promise. They are joined by Assunta, who curiously asks Annina if she has ever seen Heaven. Annina says she has not, but then describes a dream she had of talking to St. Michael and St. Peter ("Once, in the Deep of Night"). Maria Corona runs in, warning the women that the Sons of San Gennaro have vowed to take Annina away, by force if necessary, to display her in their procession. Michele, however, has forbidden Annina to attend the annual Feast of San Gennaro, and when he shows up in the street, the other women scatter, leaving Annina to face her brother. Michele mocks her religious beliefs and continues to forbid her to take the veil, while Annina seems to be looking above and beyond their existence. She comes back to the present reality when the festival arches above Mulberry Street begin to light up, signaling the oncoming procession. The Sons of San Gennaro appear, beat Michele up, tie him to a fence on the street and carry Annina away in the procession. Left alone in the street, Michele weeps in frustration as Desideria appears, and kisses him.

=== Act 2 ===
Annina and Michele attend Carmela's wedding reception at an Italian restaurant ("Be good to her, be kind"). Desideria, Michele's lover, arrives without an invitation and announces that she has been kicked out of her mother's house and wants Michele to openly acknowledge his love for her by taking her in to the wedding reception. ("Ah Michele, don't you know"). Michele refuses at first, but finally gives in. When he tries to take Desideria into the reception, it starts a fight with other guests, culminating in Michele threatening to strike the priest, Don Marco. A very drunk Michele accuses the guests of throwing away their Italian heritage, in a country that does not accept them ("I Know that You All Hate Me"). He throws a glass of wine at the wedding guests, and sinks into a chair. Annina gently tries to convince him to go home, but Desideria flies into a jealous rage and taunts him, accusing him of being in love with his sister. Michele, enraged, stabs Desideria in the back and flees. Annina holds Desideria in her arms, forgiving her, and praying with her until she dies.

=== Act 3 ===
Michele and Annina meet secretly in the subway ("You remember the time") and Annina begs Michele to turn himself in for Desideria's murder. When Michele refuses, Annina reveals that she is dying and intends to take the veil before she succumbs to illness. As her health deteriorates dangerously, Don Marco finally receives approval from the church to make Annina a nun. Carmela gives Annina her wedding dress to wear as she takes her vows. During the ceremony, Michele forces his way past watching neighbors and tries to convince her to give up her plans. However, Annina is too far gone to hear him and dies shortly after completing the ceremony.
