= Renzo Rossellini (composer) =

Italian composer

- Renzo Rossellini (photo with 1960 dedication)
- Occupations: composer, music critic, music educator, conductor

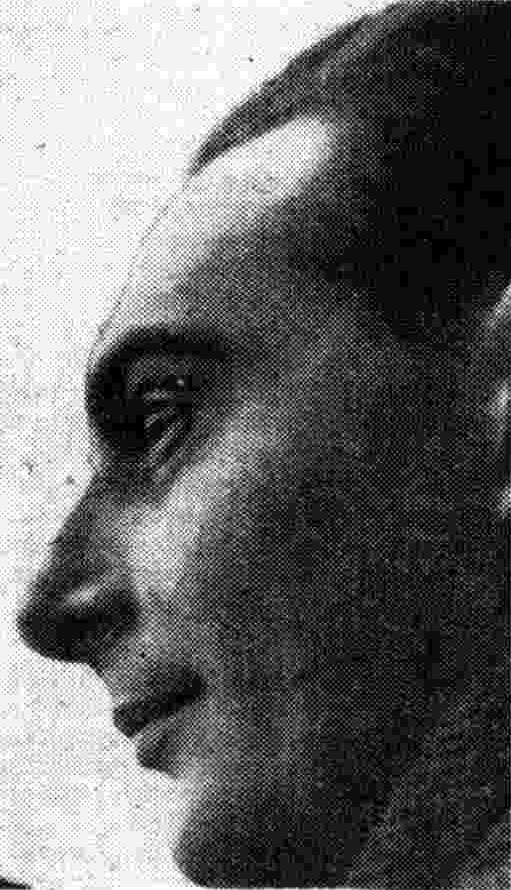
Renzo Rossellini

Renzo Rossellini (2 February 1908 – 13 May 1982) was an Italian composer, music critic, and music educator. A prolific composer who wrote a wide range of music, he is best known for his 130 film scores, and for his 10 operas. He was educated at the Conservatorio Santa Cecilia in his native city of Rome, and was director of the Liceo Musicale, Varese (1934-1935). He taught music composition at the Pesaro Conservatory during World War II, and ended his career as artistic director of the Opéra de Monte-Carlo in the 1970s. He also wrote music criticism for Il Messaggero among other publications.

== Life and career ==
The son of Angelo Giuseppe and Elettra Bellan, Renzo Rossellini was born in Rome on 2 February 1908. He had two sisters, Marcella and Micaela, and an elder brother, the film director Roberto Rossellini. His parents were affluent. Notable musicians and artists were frequent guests in the family home. Some of the people in his parents' social circle included composers Franco Alfano, Pietro Mascagni, Giacomo Puccini, and Ottorino Respighi.

Rossellini initially took private music lessons with Giacinto Sallustio before entering the Conservatorio Santa Cecilia in his native city. There he studied music composition with Giacomo Setaccioli and conducting with Bernardino Molinari. After graduating from the conservatory he worked as a music critic for Il Messaggero and as a music educator. He served as director of the Liceo Musicale, Varese in 1934-1935, and later taught music composition on the faculty of the Pesaro Conservatory from 1940-1942. In 1946 he was a founding member of Italy's musician union, Sindacato nazionale musicisti.

Rossellini began working as a composer in the 1920s. He had a tremendously large output of compositions that included 130 film scores, 4 ballets, 10 operas, 2 oratorios, cantatas, symphonies, chamber music, and vocal music. His first published composition was the art song "Le cennamelle" (1927). He wrote the music to several of his brother's films, including Rome, Open City (1945) and Paisan (1946).

In 1934 Rossellini married pianist Lina Pugnani. Their son was the producer Franco Rossellini (1935-1992). His marriage to Lina ended in divorce, and in the 1950s he married his second wife, Anita Limongelli. From 1972-1976 he was artistic director of the Opéra de Monte-Carlo. He died in Monte Carlo on May 13, 1982.

== Partial list of works ==
=== Ballets ===
- La danza di Dassine (1934)
- Racconto d’inverno (1947)
- Canti del Golfo di Napoli (1954)
- Poemetti pagani (1960)

=== Operas ===
- La Guerra (1956)
- Il vortice (1958)
- La piovra (1958)
- Le campane (1959, television opera)
- Uno sguardo dal ponte (1961)
- Il linguaggio dei fiori (1963)
- La leggenda del ritorno (1966)
- L’avventuriero (1968)
- L'Annonce faite à Marie (1970)
- La reine morte (1973)

=== Selected filmography ===
- The Ancestor (1936)
- Under the Southern Cross (1938)
- Princess Tarakanova (1938)
- The Boarders at Saint-Cyr (1939)
- The White Ship (1941)
- A Pilot Returns (1942)
- Luisa Sanfelice (1942)
- Giarabub (1942)
- Noi Vivi (1942)
- Addio Kira (1942)
- Knights of the Desert (1942)
- A Garibaldian in the Convent (1942)
- The Two Orphans (1942)
- The Man with a Cross (1943)
- Maria Malibran (1943)
- Rome, Open City (1945)
- The Tyrant of Padua (1946)
- Desire (1946)
- Before Him All Rome Trembled (1946)
- The Brothers Karamazov (1947)
- Fatal Symphony (1947)
- The Other (1947)
- L'Amore (1948)
- Love and Blood (1951)
- Shadows Over Naples (1951)
- Rome-Paris-Rome (1951)
- Without a Flag (1951)
- Messalina (1951)
- Europe '51 (1951)
- A Woman Has Killed (1952)
- Repentance (1952)
- I'm the Hero (1952)
- The Machine to Kill Bad People (1952)
- Milady and the Musketeers (1952)
- We're Dancing on the Rainbow (1952)
- The Man From Cairo (1953)
- For You I Have Sinned (1953)
- House of Ricordi (1954)
- Storm (1954)
- The Lovers of Manon Lescaut (1954)
- Orient Express (1954)
- Legions of the Nile (1959)

== Awards ==
- Nastro d'Argento: Best Score for Paisà (1946) and for I fratelli Karamazoff (1947).
