= Albert Lindquest =

1913 photograph of tenor Albert Lindquest (aka Allan Rogers Lindquest)

Albert Lindquest, also known as Allan Rogers Lindquest, (born Carl Albert Lindquest, 24 September 1891 – 5 February 1984) was an American tenor, actor, recording artist, voice teacher, conductor, radio producer, and academic.

Born to Swedish parents in Chicago, Lindquest studied law at the University of Chicago prior to beginning his performance career as a concert tenor on the Chautauqua circuit in the summer of 1912. He performed regularly as a concert singer with American orchestras through 1919; often in oratorios or in concert-versions of operas as well as other literature. He toured with the Minneapolis Symphony Orchestra in its spring tours of 1913, 1915, 1916, and 1919, and also toured with the St. Paul Symphony Orchestra in 1914 and with the New York Symphony Orchestra under Walter Damrosch in 1917. He also sang in concerts with the Oratorio Society of New York, the New York Philharmonic, the Philadelphia Orchestra, and the Chicago Symphony Orchestra.

Both Lindquest and his first wife, the soprano Leonora Allen, made recordings for the Victor Talking Machine Company in 1916. Allen was his frequent performance partner on symphony tours in the 1910s, and later in vaudeville until their divorce in 1931. With the slow down of concert work in America at the end of World War I, Lindquest transitioned into work in vaudeville beginning in August 1918 when he adopted the stage name Allan Rogers (sometimes given as Alan Rogers). For a time he alternated back and forth between his billing as Albert Lindquest (used primarily in classical concerts and recitals) and Allan Rogers (used in vaudeville and in light operas or musical theatre). This billing practice was inconsistent and sometimes he used the Albert Lindquest billing in vaudeville. He used both names for records made with Edison Records; working for that company as a recording artist from 1918 until 1922.

As Allan Rogers, Lindquest had a career in operettas and musicals on Broadway and American regional theatre from the mid 1920s into the early 1930s. He rarely performed in staged operas during his career; although he did twice perform the role of Pinkerton in staged productions of Madama Butterfly. With the onset of the Great Depression decimating performance opportunities in New York, he moved to Los Angeles in 1932 where he worked as a radio producer, orchestra conductor, and singer for KNX.

In 1935 Lindquest opened a private voice studio in Pasadena, California. As a voice teacher and academic he worked under the name Allan Rogers Lindquest; sometimes shortened to Allan Lindquest or Alan Lindquest. In 1947 he co-founded the Music Academy of the West with Lotte Lehmann, and became an influential vocal pedagogue with long term impact on this profession. Specifically his philosophy of treating the student as a "whole person" and understanding the mental state of the singer and how that impacted vocal development and performance was a novel idea at its time and has become widely adopted among voice teachers. He also briefly taught as a member of the voice faculty at Baylor University.

== Biography ==
=== Early life and initial education ===
1912 photograph of the Vox Humana men's chorus of the University of Chicago. Bottom row second from the left is Albert Lindquest.

Carl Albert Lindquest was born in Chicago, Illinois on 24 September 1891. His parents, Carl (later Charles) and Emma Lindquest, were of Swedish birth. He learned some music in public school growing up in the suburbs of Chicago, and also studied violin for three years. His parents, however, were not supportive of a music career. He attended high school at the University of Chicago Laboratory Schools. He was then educated at the University of Chicago (UC); studying law for his intended career.

Lindquest was a soloist in UC's glee club, and was also a church soloist at First Baptist Congregational Church at this point in his life. In March 1912 the Italian tenor Alessandro Bonci came to UC to give a recital at Mandel Hall. He overheard Lindquest, now in his junior year, performing with the glee club while walking on campus and was struck by the quality of the voice he heard. Bonci made the point of meeting Lindquest afterword to encourage him to leave school and pursue a performance career. He soon after departed UC and began his career as a tenor in Chautaqua concerts held in tents.

Bonci served as Lindquest's mentor during his early career, and helped him find a new voice teacher in Chicago, the bass Albert Borroff. Borroff (died 1936) was music director of the Chicago Sinai Congregation for 35 years, and had sung professionally as a concert and opera singer. He also studied voice in Chicago with the American tenor William Clare Hall; a singer trained by Jean de Reszke and Oscar Seagle.

=== Early performance career ===
1917 photograph of Albert Lindquest.

In the summer of 1912 Lindquest joined the concert company of Canadian baritone C. Edward Clarke (husband of Rachel Steinman Clarke) and violinist Sadie L. Walker with whom he traveled the Chautaqua circuit under the billing Albert C. Lindquest as part of the Clarke-Walker Company. By September 1912 this group had been re-named the Lindquest-Walker Company after Clarke had left the company. Alone, he served as a soloist that year at the Chautaqua in Rockford, Illinois.

In January 1913 he gave a recital with pianist Jeannette Durno sponsored by the Decatur Musical Club. The following April he appeared as a soloist with the Minneapolis Symphony Orchestra (MSO) in concerts given at the University of Kansas and Christian College in which he sang both alone and in duets with Luella Chilson-Ohrman. The following month he toured with the MSO and its conductor, Emil Oberhoffer, to a music festival held in Kalamazoo, Michigan. He returned often to performances with the MSO in the following years; ultimately giving 175 performances with the orchestra across his career.

In the summer of 1913 Lindquest resumed touring as a soloist in the Chautaqua circuit. prior to touring as a member of the Metropolitan Grand Opera Quartette in the 1913-1914 season. In February 1914 he was a soloist with the Chicago Symphony Orchestra (CSO) at Orchestra Hall in a program that also featured violinist Hugo Kortschak. After this he toured with the St. Paul Symphony Orchestra and conductor Walter Henry Rothwell; including a return to the music festival at the University of Kansas in April 1914. In June 1914 he was a soloist in Haydn's The Creation led by Cornell University music professor Horace Alden Miller at a music festival in Cedar Rapids, Iowa. Shortly after this he went to Paris to study for what was supposed to be a two year period with Jean de Reszke.

=== European studies, University of Michigan, and World War I era concert singer ===
On August 9, 1914 The New York Times reported that Lindquest was remaining in Paris while many other Americans were planning to return due to the outbreak of World War I. He soon changed his plans, and departed Paris on August, 29, 1914; arriving in Chicago less than two weeks later. With his studies with de Reszke cut short, he enrolled in the music program at the University of Michigan (UM); beginning his studies at UM in the fall semester of 1914. There he studied voice with Theodore Harrison.

In December 1914 he was a soloist in a Milwaukee concert with the Lyric Glee Club led by conductor Arthur Dunham; performed in a Chicago concert sponsored by the Society of American Musicians at Fullerton Hall in a program of songs by Louis Adolphe Coerne; and was a soloist in Handel's Messiah in separate productions with the Flint Choral Union under conductor and UM professor Earl V. Moore and with the St. Louis Symphony Orchestra and conductor Frederick Fischer at the Odeon Theatre in St. Louis.

In January 1915 he was a soloist once again with the MSO in a concert of opera arias in Minneapolis, and the following month he gave a concert at His Majesty's Theatre, Montreal with soprano Pauline Donalda. In April 1915 he was a soloist in Verdi's Messa da Requiem with CSO and the chorus of the Milwaukee Musical Society. He also toured with the MSO in the Spring of 1915 with Marie Sundelius as a fellow soloist; traveling 9,000 miles with the orchestra for performances in 60 different cities. The tour included a performance of John Victor Bergquist's oratorio Golgotha with the MSO conducted by the composer for a performance in Rock Island, Illinois.

In February 1916 Lindquest performed in Alva Belmont and Elsa Maxwell's "suffrage opera" Melinda and Her Sisters at the Waldorf-Astoria hotel in New York with a cast led by Marie Dressler. He was a soloist with the New York Philharmonic led by Josef Stránský on its tour to Michigan in March 1916 in which he performed arias from Aida and Don Giovanni. He toured with MSO once again in the Spring of 1916. In the summer of 1916 he was a soloist in Edvard Grieg's cantata Landkjenning with the American Union of Swedish Singers.

=== Marriage, move to New York City, fatherhood, and other performances ===
Lindquest's wife, soprano Leonora Allen, in 1923. They remained frequent performance collaborators until their divorce in 1931.

In June 1916 Lindquest married soprano Leonora Allen at a country estate just outside Harristown, Illinois. Leonora was a voice teacher at UM who had also been a soloist on the MSO tours. By September 1916 the couple had moved to New York City where Albert had obtained a post as a singer at one of the larger churches. He continued his vocal training with William V. Villonat, S. William Brady, and Herbert Witherspoon in New York City. By November 1916 both Albert and Leonora were working as contracted singers for the Victor Talking Machine Company with whom they made recordings. Some of the songs Albert recorded for Victor in 1916 included "Your tiny hand is frozen", "Sun-blest are you, o golden land", and "My home land".

In December 1916 he was a soloist with the Orpheus Men's Choir of Buffalo led by conductor John Lund. In February 1917 he was a soloist in Felix Mendelssohn's Elijah with Louis Graveure in the title role and Louis Koemmenich leading the Oratorio Society of New York (OSNY) at Carnegie Hall; was the tenor soloist in Hiawatha's Wedding Feast with the Swedish National Chorus directed by Otto H. Bostrom; and returned to Chicago's Orchestra Hall to give a joint recital with Reinald Werrenrath. The previous month he had signed a contract to be the soloist with the Damrosch Orchestra (DO, aka the New York Symphony Orchestra) on its Spring 1917 tour.

The DO's tour began in Wichita, Kansas in May 1917, and in addition to Lindquest included violinist Efrem Zimbalist, contralto Merle Alcock, soprano Nina Morgana, bass Charles Tittmann, and conductor Walter Damrosch as featured artists with the symphony. Some of the repertoire he performed on this national tour included the oratorios Scenes from the Saga of King Olaf by Elgar and Haydn's The Creation; excerpts from the opera Faust by Gounod; and a complete concert version of Saint-Saëns's Samson and Delilah in which he sang the role of Samson to Alcock's Delilah.

After the end of the DO tour, Lindquest went on tour with his wife and the cellist Cornelius van Vliet in the summer of 1917; giving performances in the Chautauqua circuit from June to September 1917. On June 16, 1917 they were soloists with the Tri-City Symphony Orchestra in the Reformation cantata given on the campus of Augustana College. In December 1917 he gave a concert with Will C. Macfarlane as his accompanist in Portland, Maine, and returned to Carnegie Hall to perform Gabriel Pierné's La croisade des enfants (English; The Children's Crusade) with OSNY. He also appeared as a soloist with the Philadelphia Orchestra in 1917.

Lindquest's daughter, Martha Louise Lindquest (later Martha Louise Johnson), was born in October 1918. In 1918 In April 1918 Lindquest returned to Carnegie Hall as a soloist in Verdi's Requiem with the New Choral Society conducted by Koemmenich and fellow soloists Marcella Craft, Alma Beck, and Arthur Middleton. The following June he again sang in Haydn's The Creation, this time at the Emmanuel Baptist Church, Brooklyn (EBCB). Both he and his wife were resident singers on the EBCB's music staff. In the Spring of 1919 Lindquest once again toured the MSO. In September 1919 he returned to Maine to perform another concert with Macfarlane; this time with soprano Myrna Sharlow. In the early 1920s he gave concert tours with his wife in England, Canada, and Australia.

=== Vaudeville, recording for Edison, Broadway, and other post-war performances ===
"Angel of Light" sung by Albert Lindquest. English language version of the aria "Ange si pur" from La favorite.

1922 advertisement for the Orpheum Circuit with Allan Rogers and Leonora Allen as headliners.

Concert opportunities in the United States wained at the time of the end of World War I, and this led Lindquest to move into work as a vaudeville entertainer using a new stage name, Allan Rogers (sometimes spelled Alan Rogers). By August 1919 he was singing under this name in the B. F. Keith Circuit. He used this name only when appearing in vaudeville or lighter entertainments like operettas. He was purportedly the first singer to perform the Israeli song "Eli, Eli" in vaudeville in 1920. That same year he shared top billing with the Marx Brothers and the Mosconi Brothers for performances at the Palace Theatre.

In 1918, Lindquest was chosen by Thomas A. Edison to make recordings for Edison Records with Edison personally selecting all of the songs he recorded for the company. Some of the songs he recorded for the company included "Macushla" (1918), "Kathleen Mavourneen" (1918), "I'll sing thee songs of Araby" (1919), "Angel of light" (1919), "Of thee I'm thinking, Margereta" (1919), "Holy, holy, holy, Lord God" (1919), "Mother Machree" (1920), "Farewell Marguerite" (1920), "The barefoot trail" (1920), "Lassie o' mine" (1920), and "Dreaming alone in the twilight" (1921). He further recorded the final trio from the opera Faust in which he sang the title role with soprano Consuelo Escobar as Marguerite and bass Virgilio Lazzari as Méphistophélès. He also made some recordings with Edison as Allan Rogers; including "Giannina mia" (1920), "I'll forget you" (1921), "If You Only Knew" (1921), "Dreaming Alone In the Twilight" (1921), and "When the Twilight Softly Falls" (1922).

In this period of Lindquest's career he gave performances in vaudeville with Fred Allen. His wife was also his partner on the vaudeville stage, and in 1921 they performed in an act billed as "Allan Rogers and Leonora Allan" in the Orpheum Circuit (OC) with stars like Sophie Tucker and Gallagher and Shean. When the couple returned to Minneapolis in 1922 where they were well known concert singers, he performed with his wife at the Minneapolis Orpheum Theatre in a reversion to the billing name of Albert Lindquest having been given special permission to do so by his agents. This inconsistency in billing would re-occur with the name Albert Lindquest and his wife Leonara Allen being billed together under those names in the OC in 1924-1925. They also were sometimes billed as Allen & Rogers.

In the mid-1920s he performed on Broadway in The Student Prince. In the summer of 1925 he joined the ongoing Broadway musical revue Artists and Models as a replacement for Bert Savoy as the behest of J. J. Shubert. By the following September he was in another Shubert backed production; starring as Jim Kenyon in the operetta Rose-Marie at the Shubert Theatre, Philadelphia with Dorothy Seegar in the title role. This production transferred to Broadway's Imperial Theatre the following month for a short run. After this he originated the role of Prince Volodya in Herbert Stothart and George Gershwin's Song of the Flame during its tryout performances but was ultimately replaced by Guy Robertson when it reached Broadway in December 1925.

In June 1927 Lindquest (as Allan Rogers) made his debut with the St. Louis Municipal Opera (SLMO) in the title role of Reginald De Koven's Robin Hood. He subsequently performed leading roles in several other SLMO production in 1927; including Tony Schmalz, Jr in The Princess Pat, Prince Volodya in Song of the Flame, Captain Doris van Damm in The Red Mill, Nanki-Poo in The Mikado, Lopez in The Serenade, and Jozsi in Gypsy Love. He later returned to the SLMO to perform Pinkerton in Puccini's Madama Butterfly; a role he also sang in Los Angeles.

In 1928 he portrayed Luselle in the original Broadway production of Karl Hajos and Harry B. Smith's operetta White Lilacs at the Shubert Theatre. This show starred Robertson as the composer Frederic Chopin, and ran for 136 performances into early 1929. This was followed by a starring part as Prince Koslofsky in A Wonderful Night; an English language adaptation of Die Fledermaus which ran at the Majestic Theatre in 1929-1930. In 1932 he portrayed Alexius in The Chocolate Soldier at the Majestic Theatre in Brooklyn (now BAM Harvey Theater); a production which then moved to the Boulevard Theatre, Queens.

=== Later career ===
In 1931 Lindquest's wife, Leonora, filed for a divorce alleging that Albert was having a sexual relationship with her friend, the actress Phyllis Marion. She later re-married to A. B. Blandy, and died in 1954. Lindquest married his second wife, Martha T. Noble, in California in 1934. Noble had two daughters from a prior marriage, and Lindquest became their step-father.

With the onset of the Great Depression, the arts scene in New York City was suffering which led Lindquest to relocate to Los Angeles, California in 1932 where he took a job with KNX radio. At KNX he worked as a singer, a conductor of station's radio orchestra, and also produced variety radio programs with stars like Jack Benny and Eddie Cantor.

In 1935 Lindquest opened a private voice studio in Pasadena, California which was highly successful. In 1936 he sang the role of Jaquino in Beethoven's Fidelio given at the Pasadena Music Festival with the Los Angeles Philharmonic. In the Fall of 1937 he traveled to Sweden with his family where he spent 14 months studying vocal pedagogy with Dr. Gillis Bratt, Haldis Ingebjart Isene (the teacher of Kirsten Flagstad and wife of baritone Ola Isene), and the voice faculty of the Royal College of Music, Stockholm. Bratt was a disciple of Manuel García with whom he trained, and Lindquest became a proponent of Garcia's methods in his own teaching.

Around late 1938 or early 1939, Lindquest returned to the United States and resumed teaching in Pasadena. He remained active as a singer in concerts with the Pasadena Symphony , and also recorded music for films made by MGM and Paramount Pictures. In 1947 he co-founded the Music Academy of the West with Lotte Lehmann, and was a voice teacher at that summer school for musicians.

In 1955 Lindquest gave masterclasses in Salzburg and Vienna. He moved his voice studio to Santa Barbara, California where he worked for several years before becoming seriously ill. In the year he spent recovering he became a Christian, and according to him this religious experience changed his philosophy of living in a way that dramatically impacted his approach to teaching singing. He spent some time guest conducting Christian choirs in Asia, and eventually moved his voice studio to Houston, Texas. He taught one year on the voice faculty of Baylor University before returning to Santa Barbara where he continued to teach late into his life.

Lindquest developed a philosophy of teaching the whole person, and recognizing the importance of understanding the mental state of the singer and the need to use psychology within the vocal teaching process. He wrote on this topic in an article published in The Bulletin of the National Association of Teachers of Singing in May 1948. His ideas of acknowledging the mental state of the singer, and working to meet psychological needs that impacted performance and vocal development were novel at the time, and became a widely adopted practice, leading to a long-term impact on vocal pedagogical practice within the field. He was also one of the earliest voice teachers, if not the first, to synthesize the Swedish and Italian traditions of vocal pedagogy in his practice; a methodology which he passed on to some of his pupils such as voice teacher David L. Jones.

Some of his notable students included bass-baritone George London, and influential voice pedagogue William Vennard. He was a member of the American Academy of Teachers of Singing. He also served as Birgit Nilsson's vocal coach during his time in Sweden.

=== Later life and death ===
Lindquest died at Santa Barbara Cottage Hospital on 5 February 1984 after a brief illness.
