= William Chapman (baritone) =

American opera singer (1923–2012)

William Chapman (April 30, 1923 – April 24, 2012) was an American operatic baritone and stage actor. He appeared in several Broadway productions and was notably a leading performer at the New York City Opera from 1957 through 1979.

== Early career ==
Born in Los Angeles, Chapman graduated from the University of Southern California and pursued vocal training with William De Mille, Edward Lippi, and Leon Cepparo in his native city. He moved to New York City in 1954 and began studying with Raymond Smolover. He starred Off-Broadway in Carmen Lombardo and John Jacob Loeb's 1955 musical Arabian Nights at the Jones Beach Marine Theatre opposite Lauritz Melchior and Helena Scott. In December 1956 he made his Broadway debut in the original production of Leonard Bernstein's Candide as Ferone and the Lawyer.

Chapman made his first opera appearance as Barone Douphol in the NBC Opera Theatre's April 1957 television broadcast of Giuseppe Verdi's La traviata with Elaine Malbin as Violetta, Igor Gorin as Germont, and John Alexander as Alfredo. He made his first appearance on the live opera stage in July 1957 at the Cleveland Musicarnival as Scarpia in Giacomo Puccini's Tosca with Beverly Sills as the title heroine and John Gutman directing. He joined the roster of principal artists at the New York City Opera later that year, making his first appearance with the company in the title role of Verdi's Macbeth on October 24, 1957 with Irene Jordan as Lady Macbeth, Norman Treigle as Banquo, Giuseppe Gismondo as Macduff, Ernest McChesney as Malcolm, and Helen Baisley as the Lady-in-waiting. The following month he appeared at the NYCO as Sharpless in Puccini's Madama Butterfly with Mary Hensley as Cio-Cio-San. After the production closed he played Jigger in Rodgers and Hammerstein's Carousel at the West Palm Beach Musicarnival with Stephen Douglass as Billy in January–February 1958.

On April 6, 1958 Chapman portrayed Tracy Gates opposite Patricia Neway as Laura Gates in the first professional production of Mark Bucci's Tale for a Deaf Ear at the NYCO under the baton of Arnold Gamson. He next portrayed Olin Blitch in Carlisle Floyd's Susannah with Phyllis Curtin in the title role and Robert Moulson as Sam Polk in May 1958. The following June he sang Macbeth opposite Shakeh Vartenissian as Lady Macbeth for the opening of the very first Festival dei Due Mondi under the baton of Thomas Schippers and the Trieste Philharmonic Orchestra.

In August 1958 Chapman portrayed the Prisoner in the world premiere of Gian Carlo Menotti's Maria Golovin at the Brussels World's Fair. He continued with the production when it premiered on Broadway in November 1958 at the Martin Beck Theatre under the umbrella of the NBC Opera Theatre. The following year he sang the role again with the NYCO. His other roles at the NYCO during the late 1950s included Escamillo in Georges Bizet's Carmen with Regina Resnik and Claramae Turner in the title role, Tarquinius in Benjamin Britten's The Rape of Lucretia with Frances Bible in the title role, Frank Maurrant in Kurt Weill's Street Scene, and Captain Corcoran in Gilbert and Sullivan's H.M.S. Pinafore.

== Later career ==
In 1960 Chapman portrayed Reverend Lapp in the original production of Frank Loesser's Greenwillow which opened on Broadway at the Alvin Theatre in March after playing at Philadelphia's Shubert Theatre. In October 1960 he returned to the NYCO to sing Major-General Stanley in Gilbert and Sullivan's The Pirates of Penzance with Arnold Voketaitis as the Pirate King and Ruth Kobart as Ruth and Marcello in La bohème with Karol Loraine as Musetta, Dolores Mari as Mimì, and David Poleri as Rodolfo. In 1961 he took over the role of the Pirate King from Voketaitis and also appeared at the City Opera that year as Michele in Puccini's Il tabarro with Arlene Saunders as Giorgetta, Count Almaviva in Wolfgang Amadeus Mozart's The Marriage of Figaro with Doris Jung as the Countess and Emile de Becque in Rodgers and Hammerstein's South Pacific.

In 1962 Chapman sang Escamillo for Leonard Bernstein's Omnibus television program discussing the opera Carmen. He sang the role again later that year at both the Spoleto Festival and the NYCO. At Spoleto he also appeared in the world premiere of Tennessee Williams's play The Milk Train Doesn't Stop Here Anymore. In March 1962 he portrayed Horace Tabor in Douglas Moore's The Ballad of Baby Doe opposite Beverly Sills in the title role and the Secret Police Agent in Menotti's The Consul.

In the 1964–1965 season Chapman added four new roles to his NYCO repertoire: Rangoni in Modest Mussorgsky's Boris Godunov with Norman Treigle in the title role; Jochanaan in Richard Strauss's Salome with Norman Kelley as Herod, Patricia Neway as Herodias, and Curtin in the title role; Boris in Dmitri Shostakovich's Lady Macbeth of the Mtsensk District with Richard Krause as Zinoviy, Eileen Schauler as Katerina, and Richard Cassilly as Sergei; and Colonel Calverley in Gilbert and Sullivan's Patience with Emile Renan as Reginald and Claramae Turner as Lady Jane. He continued to perform annually at the NYCO throughout the rest of the 1960s, but did not add any more new roles to his repertoire with the company until 1969 when he portrayed Khan Konchak in Alexander Borodin's Prince Igor.

In 1966 Chapman portrayed the King opposite Janet Blair as Anna in The King and I in a touring production. He also played that role in productions in 1959, 1963 opposite Betsy Palmer, and 1970 opposite Anne Jeffreys. In 1971 he sang the title role in Arrigo Boito's Mefistofele for the first time at the NYCO. Other NYCO roles for him during the 1970s included the four villains in Jacques Offenbach's The Tales of Hoffmann, Jack Rance in La fanciulla del West, and Étienne in Victor Herbert's Naughty Marietta. His last appearance at the NYCO was in October 1979 as Frank Maurrant in Kurt Weill's Street Scene, a production which was broadcast live on PBS's Great Performances.

During the 1970s Chapman made several guest appearances at the Hawaii Opera Theatre, portraying such roles as Amonasro in Aida, Mefistofele, Olin Blitch, and the title role in The Flying Dutchman. He also made guest appearances at the Florentine Opera in Milwaukee and the Canadian Opera Company. In 1976 he replaced John Cullum as Charlie Anderson in the original Broadway run of Gary Geld's Shenandoah.

Since the early 1980s, Chapman lived in Los Angeles with his wife Irene where he dedicated most of his time to teaching singing. He also taught on the voice faculty of the University of San Diego. In later years, he continued occasionally to perform in Los Angeles theatre. He died in 2012, six days before his 89th birthday.
