= Tulsa Opera =

Opera company in Tulsa, Oklahoma, United States

Tulsa Opera is an American opera company based in Tulsa, Oklahoma. Originally an amateur performance group named the Tulsa Opera Club (established 1948), the company was incorporated as a professional organization in 1953. Performances for the company were originally presented at the Tulsa Theater (the "Old Lady on Brady") until the Tulsa Performing Arts Center (TPAC) opened in 1977. The company currently presents an annual season of three staged operas at the TPAC. Numerous well known singers have performed in operas with the company, including Beverly Sills, Anna Moffo, Roberta Peters, Richard Tucker, Renata Scotto, Cornell MacNeil, Samuel Ramey, Simon Estes, and Jerry Hadley among many others. In addition to staged operas, the company has also presented concerts and recitals featuring artists like Barbara Cook, Susan Graham, Luciano Pavarotti, Leontyne Price, and Joan Sutherland. Opera composer and pianist Tobias Picker served as the company's artistic director from 2016 through 2022. At present, the company is being led by general director and CEO Lori Decter Wright. Aaron Beck serves as its artistic director.

== History ==
=== 1948–1953: Tulsa Opera Club ===
In 1948, five Tulsans, Bess Gowans, Ralph and Ione Sassano, Mary Helen Markham and Beverly Bliss, formed the Tulsa Opera Club. On 4 December 1948, the organization performed Giuseppe Verdi's La traviata at All Souls Unitarian Church on Boulder Ave. with Ralph and Ione Sassano portraying Alfredo and Violetta, and a young William Lewis singing the role of Gaston while a high school senior under the baton of local conductor Gerald Whitney. Impressed with the performance, Tulsa World owner Maud Lorton Meyers approached the company with the offer of financial support in exchange for a seat on the company's board of directors which was established in 1949. That same year she purchased a house at 1610 South Boulder in downtown Tulsa. This home served as both the headquarters for Tulsa Opera, and as the living quarters of the Sassano family. The current Tulsa Opera headquarters is still at this address, but with a different building that was built in 1975. In 1971 the company purchased adjacent properties to the original building which allowed for a parking lot and a much larger facility to be built.

Following La traviata, the company initially presented light operas and operettas twice yearly at Will Rogers High School with mainly amateur performers. In 1950 the company moved to the "Old Lady on Brady" and began hiring one or two professional singers per production; beginning with David Atkinson as Robert in Sigmund Romberg's The New Moon. The company continued to present light operas and operettas twice yearly through 1953, including a production of Gustav Luders's The Prince of Pilsen which featured a young Rue McClanahan as a dancer.

=== 1953–1974: Early professional years at the "Old Lady on Brady" ===
In 1953, the company restructured itself as a fully professional organization under the name Tulsa Opera; continuing to stage operas at the Tulsa Theater on Brady Street. From this point on all the principal roles were paid professionals, beginning in November 1953 with Giacomo Puccini's Madama Butterfly, directed by Anthony Stivanello of the New York Grand Opera Company, with Tomiko Kanazawa as Cio-Cio-San, Giulio Gari as Pinkerton, and John Brownlee as Sharpless. Stivanello directed many of Tulsa Opera's productions through 1973. Many prominent artists performed with the company in succeeding years, including tenors Eugene Conley (1955, Faust) Barry Morrell (Cavaradossi, 1957) and Brian Sullivan (1955, Rodolfo); sopranos Licia Albanese (Tosca, 1957), Nadine Conner (1955, Mimì,) Dorothy Kirsten (1958, Cio-Cio-San), Marguerite Piazza (Violetta, 1954); mezzo-soprano Nell Rankin (1957, Carmen); baritones Walter Cassel (Scarpia, 1957); and dancers Roman Jasinski and Moscelyne Larkin (featured in Lucia di Lammermoor, 1958).

In 1957 George Whitney stepped down as Tulsa Opera's conductor, and the company began hiring professional opera conductors such as Giuseppe Bamboschek to lead performances. Bamboschek notably conducted a highly lauded production of Giuseppe Verdi's Il trovatore in the Spring of 1959 which starred Jussi Björling as Manrico, Elinor Ross as Leonora, Leonard Warren as Count di Luna, and Jean Madeira as Alzucena. In 1959 conductor Carlo Moresco was hired as artistic director of Tulsa Opera and Jeannette Turner was hired as executive director. Moresco conducted all of the company's performances for the next sixteen years, and Turner served as the company's business manager through 1974. In 1962, in the midst of a strike at the Metropolitan Opera, Tulsa Opera was able to procure a star-studded cast of Met talent for a production of Rossini's The Barber of Seville with Roberta Peters as Rosina, Cesare Valletti as Almaviva, Frank Guarrera as Figaro, Salvatore Baccaloni as Bartolo, and stage director Dino Yannopolous.

Other notable singers to perform under Moresco's baton included sopranos Gianna D'Angelo (Lucia, 1964), Jean Fenn (1971, Desdemona), Anna Moffo (Violetta, 1960), Maralin Niska (1973, Manon Lescaut), Beverly Sills (Violetta, 1967), Renata Scotto (1967, Cio-Cio-San), Gabriella Tucci (1969, Aida), Dorothy Warenskjold (1960, Mimi), and Teresa Żylis-Gara (1973, Leonora); mezzo-sopranos Frances Bible (1969, Orlofsky), Viorica Cortez (1972, Carmen), Muriel Costa-Greenspon (1965, The Mother in Hansel and Gretel) and Mildred Miller (Cherubino, 1963); tenors John Alexander (1964, Edgardo), Norman Kelley (1965, The Witch in Hansel and Gretel); Alfredo Kraus (1968, The Duke in Rigoletto); Flaviano Labò (1960, Rodolfo), James McCracken (1971, Otello), Robert Nagy (1972, Don Jose), and Richard Tucker (Don Jose, 1962); baritones Cesare Bardelli (Scarpia, 1963), Napoléon Bisson (1960, Schaunard), Igor Gorin (1964, Ashton), Peter Glossop (1970, Scarpia), Chester Ludgin (1965, The Father in Hansel and Gretel), and Cornell MacNeil (1973, Count Di Luna); bass-baritone Norman Treigle (1966, Mephistopheles); and basses Ezio Flagello (1970, Don Basilio), Bonaldo Giaiotti (1969, Ramfis), Nicola Moscona (1960, Colline) and Italo Tajo (1965, Dulcamara).

=== 1975–1987: Edward Purrington ===
After the departure of Turner at the end of 1974, opera director Edward Purrington of the Santa Fe Opera became general manager and artistic director, beginning on New Years day 1975. He remained in that position until the conclusion of Tulsa Opera's 1986–1987 season. The first production he oversaw was Giuseppe Verdi's Rigoletto with Louis Quilico in the title role in the spring of 1975. That year also marked the return of native Tulsan William Lewis, by this time a well established artist at the Metropolitan Opera, as Cavaradossi in Tosca. Carlo Moresco remained involved in a diminished capacity as a conductor during Purrington's early years with the company, making his final conducting appearance leading Verdi's Macbeth in 1977 with Marisa Galvany as Lady Macbeth and Quilico in the title role.

In 1977, the Tulsa Performing Arts Center (TPAC) was built. Since that time, nearly all operas have been presented in the Center's Chapman Music Hall. The first opera the company staged at the TPAC was Verdi's Aida in November 1977 with Gilda Cruz-Romo in the title role, Ermanno Mauro as Radames, John Macurdy as Ramfis, and Mignon Dunn as Amneris. In 1978 Beverly Sills returned to Tulsa Opera to perform Elvira in Bellini's I puritani with Enrico Di Giuseppe as Arturo and Samuel Ramey as Giorgio. That same year the company staged Mozart's Don Giovanni with Sherrill Milnes in the title role and Paul Plishka as Leporello.

In 1979–1980 season, Purrington expanded Tulsa Opera's season from two annual production to three annual productions; a practice that has remained in place. That season included a double bill of Massanet's La Navarraise (with Nancy Shade as Anita and Jacque Trussel as Araquil) and Ruggero Leoncavallo's Pagliacci, Richard Wagner's Die Walküre (with Simon Estes giving his first performances of Wotan); and Johann Strauss II's Die Fledermaus (1980, with Ashley Putnam as Rosalinda, Dale Duesing as Eisenstein, and Judith Somogi conducting). Somogi, a conductor at the New York City Opera, was a favorite of Tulsa audiences during Purrington's tenure, making her debut with the company in 1976 with Douglas Moore's The Ballad of Baby Doe starring Costanza Cuccaro in the title role, Jean Kraft as Augusta Tabor, and John Reardon as Horace Tabor. Her other work with the company included La traviata (1979, with Diana Soviero as Violetta, John Brecknock as Alfredo, and Michael Devlin as Germont); Die Fledermaus (1980, with Ashley Putnam as Rosalinda and Dale Duesing as Eisenstein); La bohème (1981, with Soviero as Mimi, Rita Shane as Mussetta, and Stephen Dickson as Marcello); Der Rosenkavalier (1983, with Gwendolyn Jones as Octavian, Mechthild Gessendorf as The Marschallin, and Diane Curry as Annina); and Aida (1985, with Leona Mitchell as the title heroine).

Tulsa Opera has presented recitals by several prominent artists at the TPAC, including Luciano Pavarotti in 1981, Leontyne Price in 1986, and Joan Sutherland in 1987. Other singers to have performed with the company during Purrington's leadership were sopranos Josephine Barstow (1986, Manon Lescaut), Judith Blegen (1976, as Massanet's Manon), Marisa Galvany (1985, Odabella), Valerie Masterson (1985, the title role in The Merry Widow), Erie Mills (1981, Marie), Rosalind Plowright (1987, Elizabeth in Don Carlo), and Sylvia Sass (1985, Tosca); mezzo-sopranos Fiorenza Cossotto (1984, Carmen); tenors William Johns (1982, Manrico), Jerry Hadley (1984, Arturo), Veriano Luchetti (1984, Don Jose), and Neil Shicoff (1986, Faust); baritone James Billings (1980, Frosch); bass-baritones James Morris (1980, Boris Godunov and Richard Stilwell (1982, Rossini's Figaro); basses Jerome Hines (1987, The Grand Inquisitor) and Giorgio Tozzi (1981, Sulpice); and actress Anna Russell (1981, The Duchess of Crakentorp).

Purrington left Tulsa Opera in the Summer of 1987 to take a post as director of the Washington National Opera. Bernard Uzan succeeded him as director, but left after just one season with the company citing friction with Tulsa Opera's board. His tenure notably consisted of the company's first staging of The Tales of Hoffmann with Robert Grayson in the title role, Cyndia Sieden as Olympia, Cynthia Clarey as Nicklausse, and Eric Halfvarson as the four villains. Also heard that season was Camille Saint-Saëns's Samson and Delilah with Florence Quivar as Dalila, William Johns as Samson, and Richard Sutliff as the High Priest.

=== 1988–1992: Nicholas Muni ===
In 1988 Nicholas Muni was appointed artistic director of Tulsa Opera and Myrna Smart Ruffner was named general manager. In 1990 Tulsa Opera's Young Artists gave performances of Philip Glass's The Juniper Tree with the composer in attendance. That same year, Tulsa Opera produced a new version of Verdi's La traviata with designs by John Conklin that staged the opera in scenes within a disco bar, swimming pool, and modern hospital room. Starring Frances Ginsberg as Violetta and John de Haan as Alfredo, the production drew national attention. Muni & Conklin's production of the opera was purchased and presented by the New York City Opera and played for two seasons to great acclaim\.

Another critical success for Tulsa Opera in 1990 was the first staging of Le trouvère (the French language version of Verdi'sIl trovatore) in the United States using a new critical edition by musicologist, conductor, and Verdi scholar David Lawton. Lawton conducted the premiere with Margaret Jane Wray as Leonore, Craig Sirianni as Manrique, Greer Grimsley as Le Comte de Luna, and Barbara Conrad as Alzucena. This version was published by Ricordi and the University of Chicago Press in 2001. This was followed by the United States premiere of Gioachino Rossini's Armida on 29 February 1992 in celebration of the 200th anniversary of Rossini's birth with a cast the included Christine Weidinger in the title role, Thomas Young as Rinaldo, and Ronald Naldi as Ubaldo. A joint production by Tulsa Opera and Minnesota Opera, it involved the Tulsa Ballet, and the Tulsa Philharmonic, the work was staged by Nicholas Muni, designed by John Boesche, conducted by Richard Bradshaw, and recorded for national broadcast on NPR.

Other highlights of Muni's tenure included performances by sopranos Amy Burton (1992, Josephine), Jan Grissom (1991, Pamina), Elizabeth Knighton (1989, Susannah Polk), Marquita Lister (1989, Mimi), Carmen Pelton (1991, The Queen of the Night), Linda Roark-Strummer (1991, Minnie), and Maryanne Telese (1991, Cio-Cio-San); mezzo-sopranos Jane Bunnell (1991, Suzuki) and Judith Forst (1990, title role in La Cenerentola; directed by Rosalind Elias); tenors Richard Brunner (1989, Sam Polk), Carroll Freeman (1990, Don Ramiro), Peter Riberi (1991, Pinkerton) and Kip Wilborn (1991, Tamino); baritones Donnie Ray Albert (1992, Jack Rance), Cris Groenendaal (Captain Corcoran, 1992), Robert Honeysucker (1990, Alidoro), and Motti Kaston (1991, Sharpless); bass-baritone Jeffrey Wells (1989, Olin Blitch); and basses Pierre Charbonneau (1990, Don Magnifico), Claude Corbeil (1990, Dandini), and Peter Volpe (1989, Colline). Also notable was the US debut of British director Keith Warner, who directed Die Zauberfloete.

=== 1993–2008: Carol I. Crawford ===
Carol I. Crawford was appointed general director in 1993, and remained in that post until 2008. The original production of Rachel Portman's The Little Prince (presented in Tulsa in 2005) was jointly produced and co-financed by the Tulsa Opera and several other opera companies, including the Houston Grand Opera, the New York City Opera, the Boston Lyric Opera, and the Skylight Opera Theatre. Notable singers to perform with the company during her tenure included Pamela Armstrong, Harolyn Blackwell, Stephanie Blythe, Sarah Coburn, Andrea Gruber, Peter Lindskoog, John Matz, and Alfred Walker among others.

In 2002, the bankruptcy of the Tulsa Philharmonic had a negative impact on the company, as the orchestra had served as the longtime pit musicians of the opera company. Many musicians left Tulsa, and the cost and expense of bringing in instrumentalists into the city greatly reduced rehearsal times while simultaneously raising costs of productions. The establishment of the Tulsa Symphony in 2005 helped remediate some of that problem.

=== 2008–2016: Kostis Protopapas ===
From 2008 to 2016, the company’s artistic director was Kostis Protopapas, who had previously served as associate conductor and chorus master under Carol I. Crawford.

=== 2016–2022: Tobias Picker ===
Ken McConnell was appointed as interim general director and CEO in July 2018, and subsequently appointed to the full general director and CEO position. Tobias Picker was named to the post of artistic director in 2016, a position he held until 2022.

In May 2019, Tulsa Opera presented a new staging of Mozart's Don Giovanni with Lucia Lucas in the title role, becoming the first American opera company to feature a transgender woman in a principal role.

Tobias Picker stepped down from the artistic director post in 2022, and Aaron Beck was subsequently appointed artistic director. In June 2023, Ken McConnell resigned as general director and Aaron Beck was appointed as interim general director in addition to his duties as artistic director. This announcement arrived at the same time as the cancellation of Tulsa Opera's two mainstage productions for the 2023–24 season, with budgetary issues being cited as the reason for the cancellation.
