= Jean Kraft =

American operatic mezzo-soprano (1927–2021)

- Born: Jean Marie Kraft; January 9, 1927; Menasha, Wisconsin, U.S.
- Died: July 15, 2021 (aged 94); Englewood, New Jersey, U.S.
- Occupation: Operatic mezzo-soprano
- Years active: 1960–1990
- Organizations: New York City Opera; Santa Fe Opera; Metropolitan Opera
- Spouse: Richard Elias

Jean Kraft (January 9, 1927 – July 15, 2021) was an American operatic mezzo-soprano. She began her career singing with the New York City Opera (NYCO) during the early 1960s, after which she embarked on a partnership with The Santa Fe Opera from 1965 through 1987. In 1970 she joined the roster of singers at the Metropolitan Opera in New York City where she remained a fixture until 1989. She also performed as a guest of many other opera companies throughout the United States. In 2005 Opera News called her "a gifted mezzo and observant, imaginative actress who lent distinction to a wide range of character roles. By the end of her Met tenure, she had sung nearly 800 performances and become a solid audience favorite."

== Early life and education ==
Born in Menasha, Wisconsin on January 9, 1927, Kraft began her career working as pianist as a teenager and was also a proficient clarinet and trumpet player. After working as a pianist for four years she decided to reorient her path towards a singing career, at this point more interested in the concert repertoire than in opera. She entered the Curtis Institute of Music where she studied voice under Giannini Gregory. She later continued with further studies under Theodore Harrison in Chicago, William Ernest Vedal in Munich, and Povla Frijsh in New York City.

== Career ==
=== 1960s ===
While still a student, Kraft sang the role of Laura Gates in the world premiere of Mark Bucci's Tale for a Deaf Ear at the 1957 Tanglewood Music Festival in a student production directed by Boris Goldovsky and conducted by James Billings. She made her professional opera debut on February 18, 1960 as the Mother in Hugo Weisgall's Six Characters in Search of an Author at the NYCO with Beverly Sills as The Coloratura. She appeared with the NYCO in several more productions during the 1960s including, Miss Jessel in Britten's The Turn of the Screw (1962), the Forewoman in Charpentier's Louise (1962), Marcellina in Mozart's Le nozze di Figaro (1962), Maud Lowder in Douglas Moore's The Wings of the Dove (1962), Death in Stravinsky's The Nightingale (1963), Flora in Verdi's La traviata (1963), Sarah Chicken in Robert Ward's The Lady from Colorado (1964), and Penelope in Menotti's Help, Help, the Globolinks! (1969) among others. She had sung the role of Penelope the previous year for the work's world premiere at the SFO.

==== At The Santa Fe Opera ====
Kraft was also highly active with The Santa Fe Opera during the 1960s. In 1965 she made her debut with the company as Adelaide von Waldner in Richard Strauss's Arabella. Her other performances with the company during these years included Marcellina (1965); Thisbe in Rossini's La cenerentola (1966); Madame de Croissy in Poulenc's Dialogues of the Carmelites (1966); Mother Goose in Stravinsky's The Rake's Progress (1966); Maddalena in Verdi's Rigoletto (1966); Margret in Alban Berg's Wozzeck (1966); Giannetta in Donizetti's L'elisir d'amore (1968); the Third Lady in Mozart's The Magic Flute (1968); Annina in Strauss's Der Rosenkavalier; and Ninon in the United States premiere of Penderecki's The Devils of Loudun (1969) among others.

==== Performances in New York and elsewhere ====
While mostly busy performing in operas in New York City and Santa Fe during the 1960s, Kraft also performed with other opera companies and in concerts throughout the United States during these years. In May 1962 she gave her New York City recital debut at Carnegie Recital Hall with pianist and composer Yehudi Wyner accompanying her in a program that included the premieres of several pieces by Wyner. In Philadelphia Kraft sang the roles of The Monitress in Puccini's Suor Angelica (1962) and Rossweisse in Wagner's Die Walküre (1963) with the Philadelphia Lyric Opera Company. In April 1964 she sang in the New York City premiere of Jack Gottlieb's Tea Party at the Donnell Library Center for the New York Composers Forum.

=== Metropolitan Opera: 1970–1989 ===
In 1969 Kraft was offered a contract by Rudolf Bing to join the roster of singers at the Metropolitan Opera. She leapt at the opportunity after recently having turned down a number of similar offers from a few different European opera houses. She made her Met debut on February 7, 1970, as Flora in La Traviata with Gabriella Tucci as Violetta, Nicolai Gedda as Alfredo, Robert Merrill as Germont, and Francesco Molinari-Pradelli conducting. Thus was the beginning of a nineteen-year-long artistic relationship which resulted in several CD recordings, eight "Live From the Met" recordings for television and video release, and well over 80 Saturday Texaco "Met" Broadcasts.

Kraft became a favorite at the Met very quickly in roles like Emilia in Verdi's Otello, the drug-addicted Mrs. Sedley in Britten's Peter Grimes, and Mamma Lucia in Franco Zeffirelli's production of Mascagni's Cavalleria Rusticana. She was also an admired Mother Jeanne of the Holy Child Jesus in the critically acclaimed 1977 John Dexter staging of Dialogues of the Carmelites. In describing the haunting finale of that production, Opera News stated, "No one who has seen Dexter’s staging of the finale will ever forget it: the chorus of doomed nuns, singing the 'Salve Regina', was diminished, one voice at a time, as each woman marched to the guillotine. Finally, only Sister Constance and Mother Jeanne were left. Slowly, Kraft's Jeanne picked herself up and, supporting herself with her cane, hobbled defiantly to her death." Kraft later took over the role of Madame de Croissy in subsequent mountings of that production during the 1980s.

Although Kraft's performances at the Met were largely in comprimario roles, she occasionally starred, such as Herodias in Strauss's Salome (1973, 1977) initially with Grace Bumbry in the title role and Robert Nagy as Herod; Ulrica in Verdi's Un ballo in maschera (1970, 1976) initially with Elinor Ross as Amelia, Carlo Bergonzi as Riccardo, Merrill as Renato, and Roberta Peters as Oscar; Federica in Verdi's Luisa Miller (1971, 1978, 1979) initially with Adriana Maliponte as Luisa and Plácido Domingo as Rodolfo; Gertrud in Humperdink's Hänsel und Gretel (1971–1983) initially with Judith Forst as Hänsel and Joy Clements as Gretel; and Suzuki in Puccini's Madama Butterfly (1973–1981) initially with Gilda Cruz-Romo as Cio-Cio-San and William Lewis as Pinkerton. Some of the many supporting roles she portrayed were Berta in Rossini's Il Barbiere di Siviglia (with Marilyn Horne), Countess di Coigny in Giordano's Andrea Chénier, the Duchesse of Krakentorp in Donizetti's La Fille du Régiment (with Luciano Pavarotti and Joan Sutherland), Gertrude in Gounod's Roméo et Juliette, Grandmother Buryjovka in Janáček's Jenůfa (with Astrid Varnay), Hecuba in Les Troyens by Berlioz (with Jon Vickers and Shirley Verrett), Ines in Verdi's Il Trovatore, Marcellina (with Teresa Stratas and Frederica von Stade), Marthe in Gounod's Faust (with Franco Corelli), Ninetta in Verdi's I Vespri Siciliani (with Cristina Deutekom), and the Madrigalist in Puccini's Manon Lescaut (with Dorothy Kirsten and John Alexander) among others. Her final and 784th performance at the Met was on April 5, 1989 as Larina in Tchaikovsky's Eugene Onegin with Mirella Freni as Tatiana, Jorma Hynninen in the title role, and conductor James Levine.

During her years working for the Met, Kraft continued to return periodically for performances with the Santa Fe Opera. Her roles with the company during these years included Flora (1970), Mother Goose (1970), Marcellina (1970, 1973, 1976, 1985, 1987), Penelope (1970), Death (1970), Suzuki (1972), Lapérouse in the United States Premiere of Aribert Reimann's Melusine (1972), Herodias (1972, 1979), Kate Julian in Britten's Owen Wingrave (1973), Countess Geschwitz in Berg's Lulu (1974), the Third Lady (1974, 1984, 1986), Meg Page in Verdi's Falstaff (1975, 1977), Genevieve in Debussy's Pelléas et Mélisande (1977), Larina (1980), Berta (1981), Miss Pick in Hindemith's News of the Day (1981), the notary's wife in Strauss's Intermezzo (1984), May in the U.S. premiere of Henze's We Come to the River (1984), and Juno in the world premiere of John Eaton's The Tempest (1985). Her last performance with the company was as Widow Zimmerlein in Strauss's Die schweigsame Frau in 1987.

Kraft was also active performing in concerts and operas with other organizations during the 1970s and 1980s. As a concert singer she drew particular acclaim for her performances in several of Mahler's symphonies, notably singing his Symphony No. 8 with the Chicago Symphony Orchestra in 1977 and performing/recording his Symphony No. 2 with the New York Philharmonic under Leonard Bernstein. Some of the opera companies she performed with during these years included the Houston Grand Opera, the Dallas Opera, the New Orleans Opera, and the Opera Company of Boston. In 1976 she made a highly praised portrayal of Augusta Tabor in Moore's The Ballad of Baby Doe with Tulsa Opera. In 1984 she made her debut with the Lyric Opera of Chicago as Larina, returning there to portray the Fortuneteller in Arabella (1984), and Annina (1989). She also portrayed Mrs. Sedley in 1984 in Jean-Pierre Ponnelle's critically acclaimed production of Peter Grimes at the Maggio Musicale Fiorentino in Italy. In April 1986 she portrayed Dinah in Bernstein's A Quiet Place at the Vienna State Opera under the baton of the composer. Kraft recalled in 2005 interview, "Keeping the hand in and knowing all the right people—I never did that. They came into my life, like Bernstein. I did A Quiet Place in Vienna, and after we recorded it, he said, 'I'm sorry I didn't write an aria for you.' And I said, 'I am, too!'" Her last opera appearance was in 1990 at the Seattle Opera as the Duchesse of Krakentorp in Donizetti's La Fille du régiment.

== Later life ==
After retiring from the opera stage in 1990, Kraft divided her time between her family and teaching singing in Santa Fe. Her husband, the violinist Richard Elias, played in the Met Orchestra during Kraft's tenure at the house and retired with her. The couple built a house in Santa Fe in 1974, where they lived when not in New York City. Elias died in 2003. A few years after his death, Kraft moved back to New York City. Beginning in 2017, Kraft resided at the Lillian Booth Actors Home in Englewood, New Jersey, where she died on July 15, 2021, at age 94.
