= Tale for a Deaf Ear =

Opera by Mark Bucci

- Opera by Mark Bucci
- Language: Italian; English; German
- Based on: story by Elizabeth Enright
- Premiere: August 5, 1957; Tanglewood Music Festival

Tale for a Deaf Ear is an opera in one act with music and lyrics by Mark Bucci, sung in three languages and based on a story by Elizabeth Enright that appeared in the April 1951 edition of Harper's Magazine. The work was commissioned by Samuel Wechsler for performance at the 1957 Tanglewood Music Festival. The work received an enthusiastic response from an overflow audience of 1,300 when it premiered at Tanglewood on August 5, 1957. The cast was of student artists, of which Billings and Kraft went on to have successful opera careers and Purrington became a nationally known opera director and administrator. The production was directed by the great impresario Boris Goldovsky. The opera received its first professional production at the New York City Opera on April 6, 1958, in a double billing with Leonard Bernstein's Trouble in Tahiti. The production was staged at New York City Center by director Michael Pollock and using costumes and sets designed by Paul Sylbert.

== Roles ==
Role	Voice type	Premiere Cast, August 5, 1957 (Conductor: - James Billings)	New York City Opera Cast, April 6, 1958 (Conductor: - Arnold Gamson)
Laura Gates	mezzo-soprano	Jean Kraft	Patricia Neway
Tracy Gates	baritone	John Hornor	William Chapman
The Florentine noblewoman	soprano	Donna Jeffrey	Beverly Bower
The Scottish farm girl	soprano	Elaine Quint	Lee Venora
The German soldier	tenor	John King	Richard Cassilly
The Doctor	spoken	Edward Purrington	Arthur Newman

== Synopsis ==
The opera opens on a snowy winter afternoon in the suburban home of Tracy and Laura Gates, who begin arguing about Tracy's drinking. As they are about to fall to blows, he dies of a heart attack, and she prays for his revival. A Greek chorus appears and explains that, centuries ago, the ancient mariner Hypraemius was so kind to repentant souls, that not only did he ascend into heaven, but was granted four miracles (one for each season), and if a true penitent prayed at 3:59 in the afternoon for the return of their dead, their request would be granted. What follows are reenactments of Hypraemius' first three miracles.

The first of these occurs in the spring, in 16th-century Tuscany, where a Florentine noblewoman prays for the return of her infant son. The scene shifts to Scotland, in the summertime, where a farm girl pleads for the return of the family cow. The scene shifts again to autumn in Central Europe, during the Thirty Years' War. Here, a German soldier prays for the return of his brother, who lies dead in his arms. Finally, the scene returns to the Gates' home, where Tracy revives with no awareness of what has happened. Despite Laura's efforts to abandon her former ways, the two resume their squabble, and Tracy has a second heart attack, this time dying permanently. A doctor enters to administer an injection to Laura as the chorus intones the moral, "The only death in life is the death of love."

== Performance history ==
The opera has been performed very infrequently since its premiere; in 1997, a production was mounted in New York with the Center for Contemporary Opera. In February 2018, the opera was performed for the first time in the Midwest at the College-Conservatory of Music at the University of Cincinnati, where it was featured in a triple bill of one-act operas alongside Bernstein's Trouble in Tahiti and Gian Carlo Menotti's The Telephone.
