= Purrington =

Purrington is a surname. Notable people with the surname include:

- Ben Purrington (born 1996), English footballer
- Edward Purrington (1929–2012), American opera director and artistic administrator
- Hilary Purrington (born 1990), American composer
- Tom Purrington (born 2000), English footballer
