= Michael Pollock (tenor) =

American opera singer

Michael Pollock (October 20, 1921 – November 8, 2003) was an American operatic tenor, opera director, and voice teacher. He notably worked as both a performer and director at the New York City Opera during the 1940s and 1950s.

== Biography ==
Born in New York City, Pollock began his career appearing in Off-Broadway productions in the mid-1940s. In 1947–1948 he was a member of the chorus in the Broadway revival of Marc Blitzstein's The Cradle Will Rock. In 1949 he became a member of the New York City Opera (NYCO) at the invitation of Laszlo Halasz, making his debut with the company as the animal vendor in Richard Strauss's Der Rosenkavalier. In 1953 he created the role of Kokhkaryov in the world premiere of Bohuslav Martinů's The Marriage with the NBC Opera Theater.

Pollock appeared as a character tenor in numerous NYCO productions up through 1956, notably creating roles in the world premieres of David Tamkin's The Dybbuk (1951) and Aaron Copland’s The Tender Land (1954). He also sang with the company in the United States premieres of Gottfried von Einem's The Trial (1953), Frank Martin's Der Sturm (1956), and Carl Orff's Der Mond (1956). Other roles for him with the company included King Kaspar in Gian Carlo Menotti's Amahl and the Night Visitors (1952) and Leo Hubbard in Blitzstein's Regina.

In 1957 Pollock moved away from performance to focus on working as a stage director at the NYCO. He notably directed the NYCO's first mountings of Wolfgang Amadeus Mozart's Die Entführung aus dem Serail (1957), Leonard Bernstein's Trouble in Tahiti (1958, conducted by the composer), the first professional production of Mark Bucci's Tale for a Deaf Ear (1958), and the world premiere of Robert Ward's He Who Gets Slapped (1959) among others.

From the 1960s through the 1980s, Pollock taught singing and directed opera theatre programs at various institutions; notably serving on the faculties of Florida State University and Indiana University among others. He died in San Diego, California at the age of 82. and Illinois State University.
