= Wiener Kammeroper =

Coordinates: 48°12′37″N 16°22′41″E

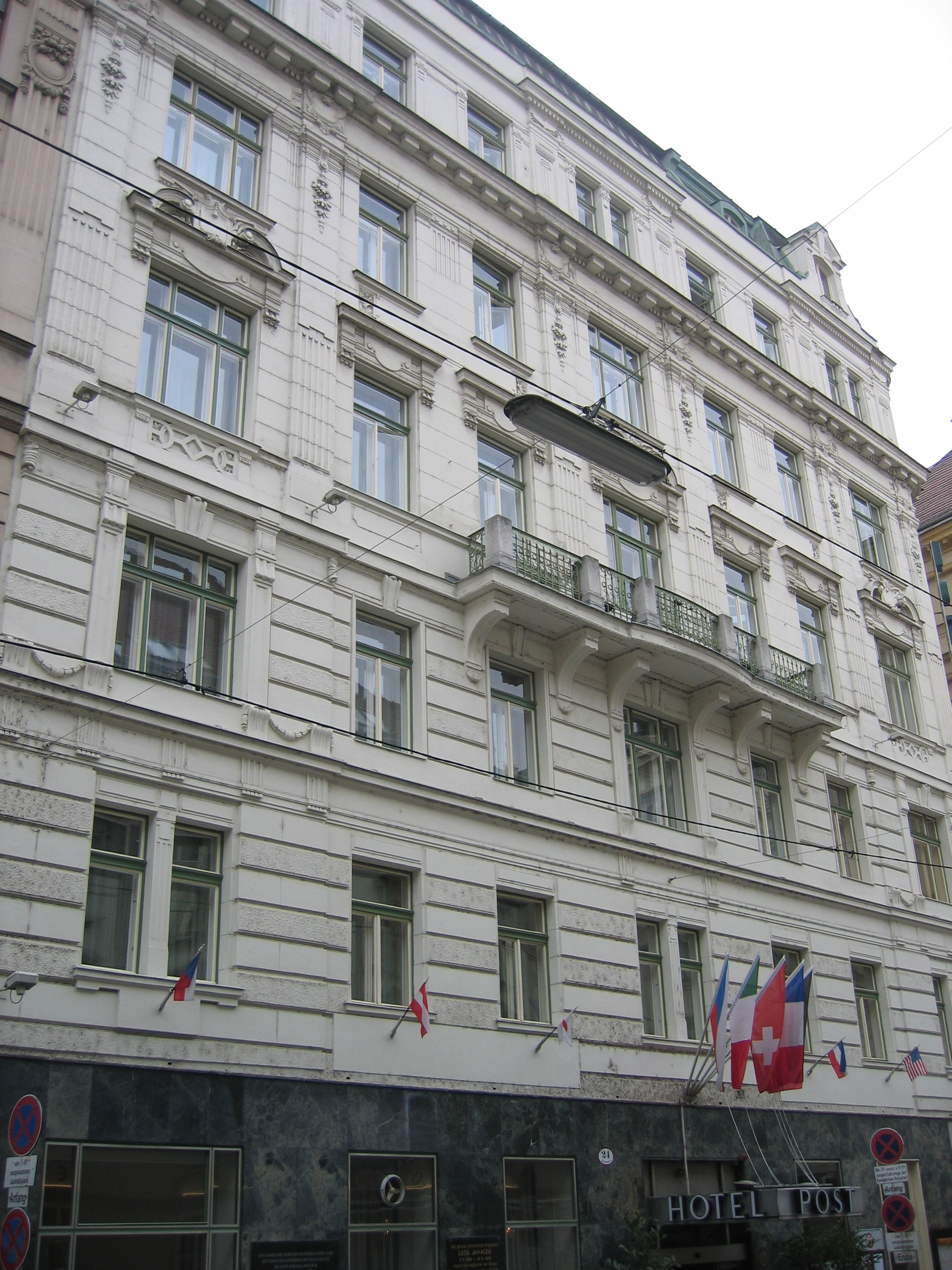
An image of Wiener Kammeroper

Wiener Kammeroper is a chamber opera theatre and company in Vienna, Austria. Founded in 1948 by the conductor Hans Gabor, it was originally named Vienna Opera Studiom receiving its present name in 1953. It is located at 24 Fleischmarkt Street in the city centre. It has been managed by Theater an der Wien since 2012.

== History ==
Initially, the company had no dedicated building. Performances were held at the Konzerthaus and at Schönbrunn Palace. In 1961 a subsidy from the Ministry of Education and the City of Vienna allowed the company to establish a permanent venue in the former ballroom of the Hotel Post on Fleischmarkt Street, where the dance hall was converted to an opera stage. The new theatre was inaugurated with a performance of short operas: Martinů's The Marriage, Giuseppe Maria Orlandini' Il marito giocatore, and Monteverdi's Lamento d'arianna. as adapted by Carl Orff.

Early programs at the Opera House included opera buffa, operettas, parodies and traditional Viennese Singspiel, as well as chamber arrangements of larger works such as Bizez's Carmen and Puccini's La Bohème. Today, the focus is on premieres of contemporary works and the development of young performers. Chamber operas by Tom Johnson, Peter Maxwell Davies, Luciano Chailly, Philip Glass and Hans Werner Henze were premiered at the Kammeroper. The company has also staged rock operas that translate classics such as La Bohème and Carmen for a younger generation.

Gabor retired from conducting in 1982 while continuing as the company's artistic director and manager. In 1983 the theater launched Studio K, a series featuring contemporary works and composers. In 1992 the theater began a series of open-air performances of Mozart operas at the Roman Ruin of Schönbrunn Palace. Conservationists determined in 1999 that the monument was in jeopardy, and performances were discontinued.

In 1994 Hans Gabor died unexpectedly and Rudolf Berger continued programming. During the 1999/2000 season Isabella Gabor and Holger Bleck took over the management of the Kammeroper.

In 2012, Theater an der Wien took over management of the company and Sebastian F. Schwarz was named artistic director. Jochen Breiholz assumed the position in 2016. In February 2021 Schwartz and Renate Futterknecht were named co-business managers. In March 2021 playwright Karin Bohnert assumed the position of artistic director and Walter Reicher was named business manager.

== Hans Gabor Belvedere Singing Competition ==
Since 1982, the Kammeroper has administered and presented the International Hans Gabor Belvedere Singing Competition.

== Past performances ==
- The Flood by Boris Blacher (1956)
- Triumph of Honour by Alessandro Scarlatti (1956)
- The Marriage by Martinů
- Il marito giocatore by Giuseppe Maria Orlandini
- Ariadne's Lament by Claudio Monteverdi, as adapted by Carl Orff
- Pagliacci by Ruggero Leoncavallo (1986). Produced by George Tabori, the production was invited to Berlin the following year for the festival "Berlin TheaterTreffen" and recorded on television.
