= James Billings =

American baritone (1932–2022)

James Hopkins Billings (March 29, 1932 – February 3, 2022) was an American operatic baritone, librettist, and opera director. He began his career in the late 1950s in Boston and later became a member of the New York City Opera where he performed regularly from the early 1970s through the 1990s. A specialist in the comprimario repertoire, he portrayed more than 175 opera roles on stage during his long career. Billings also wrote librettos for numerous operas for children and after the mid-1990s directed several opera productions.

== Career ==
Billings graduated with a bachelor's degree in vocal performance from Wichita State University and then pursued graduate music studies at Boston University. While at BU he also studied at the Berkshire Music Center in the summers and notably conducted the world premiere of Mark Bucci's opera Tale for a Deaf Ear at the Tanglewood Music Festival in August 1957 with a cast that included Jean Kraft and Edward Purrington.

Billings began his professional career singing under Sarah Caldwell at the Opera Company of Boston during the company's first season in 1958, singing there regularly through 1970 in such roles as Sellem in The Rake's Progress, Napoleon in the American premiere of War and Peace, and Harlequin in Ariadne auf Naxos. In 1962 he sang the role of Polonius in the world premiere of Sergius Kagen's opera Hamlet, after the play by Shakespeare, in Baltimore at the Peabody Art Theater with Laszlo Halasz conducting members of the Baltimore Symphony. In 1964 he made his debut at the Lyric Opera of Chicago as Benoit in La bohème. In 1969 he shared the stage with Beverly Sills in a production of Ariadne auf Naxos with the Boston Symphony Orchestra. Billings later performed with Sills frequently at the New York City Opera during the 1970s, and he notably served as the majordomo for Sills' final performance, Beverly! Her Farewell Performance, in 1981.

In 1970 Billings sang in the company of the first national tour of Camelot and returned to the Lyric Opera of Chicago to portray Maestro Spinelloccio in Gianni Schicchi. He appeared on Broadway in 1971 in the revival of Kurt Weill's Johnny Johnson after which he sang the title role in Don Pasquale with the New York Lyric Opera in Summer of 1972. The following autumn, he joined the roster at the New York City Opera, making his first appearance in October as Spalanzani in The Tales of Hoffmann, opposite Sills and Norman Treigle. He continued singing there for roughly the next three decades in well over a hundred roles, including Alcindoro in La boheme, Sacristan in Tosca, Goro in Madama Butterfly, Ko-Ko in The Mikado, Frank in Die Fledermaus, Baron Puck in La Grande-Duchesse de Gérolstein, Henrik Ibsen in Song of Norway, General Novikovich in The Merry Widow, Don Magnifico in La Cenerentola, Badger in Janáček's The Cunning Little Vixen, Beckmesser in Richard Wagner's Die Meistersinger, and Alberich in Wagner's Das Rheingold to name just a few. In 1980 he notably sang the role of Agent in the world premiere of Stanley Silverman's Madame Adare. He has sung on a number of recordings with the New York City Opera, including the 1978 recording of Die lustige Witwe (excerpts, with Sills, EMI) and the 1986 recording of Leonard Bernstein's Candide which won a Grammy Award for Best Opera Recording in 1987. In 1989 he portrayed the role of Monsieur Beaunoir in The New Moon which was filmed live for PBS's Great Performances and subsequently released on DVD.

Billings also occasionally sang with other opera houses and ensembles as a guest artist. In 1980 he performed Frank in Die Fledermaus with the Philadelphia Orchestra. In 1982 he performed the role of the Judge in Trial By Jury with Washington National Opera. That same year he sang the role of Salieri in the world premiere of P.D.Q. Bach's opera A Little Nightmare Music at Carnegie Hall. In 1983 he returned to the Lyric Opera of Chicago to perform the role of Ko-Ko, and sang there again in 1994 for the company's first production of Candide.

Billings was also the author of several librettos for children's operas. He wrote three librettos for composer Dennis Arlan (The Ballad of the Bremen Band, The Daughter of the Double Duke of Dingle, and Meanwhile, Back at Cinderella's) and one libretto for composer Ted Kicilek (Hansel and Gretel) to name just a few of his works. For his work as a lyricist and librettist he won several awards from the American Society of Composers, Authors and Publishers. Billings also directed a number of operas with the New York City Opera and other companies beginning with the NYC Opera's September 1996 production of H.M.S. Pinafore in which he also portrayed the role of Sir Joseph Porter. In 2005, Springfield Regional Opera presented the premiere of his opera Babes in the Woods.

Billings also authored several books, including The Nutley Papers — Springfield Regional Opera Company premiered his opera based on this novel — and the children's book The Daughter of the Double-Duke of Dingle. Billings died on February 3, 2022, at the age of 89.
