= Eleanor Ross =

Eleanor Ross may refer to:

- Eleanor L. Ross (born 1967), judge on the United States District Court for the Northern District of Georgia
- Eleanor Ross Taylor (1920–2011), American poet

== See also ==
- Elinor Ross (1926–2020), American opera singer
