= René Herbin =

French pianist (1911–1953)

- Born: 1911; Vitry-le-François, Grand Est, France
- Died: 1 September 1953 (aged 41–42); Mount Cimet near Barcelonnette, France
- Education: Conservatoire de Paris
- Occupations: Pianist; composer
- Years active: 1930s–1953

René Herbin (1911 – 1 September 1953) was a French pianist and composer. He was killed in the Mount Cimet air disaster in the French Alps.

== Life ==
Born in Vitry-le-François, Herbin entered the Conservatoire de Paris at the age of 14. There, he studied piano with Isidor Philipp and composition with Noël Gallon and Henri Büsser. He won two First Prizes. At 26, he accompanied the cellist Maurice Maréchal on a tour of the Middle East. After the Second World War broke out, Herbin was mobilized in 1939. He was taken prisoner in Germany, where he remained in captivity for nearly five years in several forced labour camps. Interned in very precarious conditions, he nevertheless managed to write many works: a Sonata for violin and piano, Deïrdre des Douleurs for chamber orchestra, Sonata for piano, Album d'images, Preludes baroques, for piano. Returning to Paris in 1945, he resumed his activities as a pianist and composer and premiered his first piano quartet in 1949 with the Trio Pasquier. In the early 1950s, he received commissions for work from the State and Radio. It was on this occasion that he composed Trois Songes pour orchestre (1951) and the Concerto pour piano (1952), whose posthumous premiere was ensured in 1956 by Vlado Perlemuter.

=== Death ===
On 1 September 1953, Herbin, accompanied by the violinist Jacques Thibaud, boarded Air France Flight 178 – a flight from Paris to Saigon, the city where the musicians were expected to perform in concert. As they approached the planned stopover at Nice airport, their plane crashed on Mount Cimet in the French Alps. There were no survivors among the 42 people on board.

=== Société Musicale René Herbin ===
In 1992, Elizabeth Herbin, pianist and daughter of the composer, founded the Société Musicale René Herbin, which was then presided over by Vlado Perlemuter and Henri Dutilleux. Its purpose is to make the Herbin and his work known and to disseminate his music, which is still not widely known and not very well recorded. It thus repairs what the untimely death of a 42-year-old musician recognized by his peers took away from the French musical life of the first half of the 20th century.

== Compositions ==
List of works by Herbin:

- 1929: Toccata
- 1929–1930: 12 Préludes, for piano
- 1930: Fantaisie, for piano
- 1934: Ballade, for piano
- 1934–1935: 6 Études de haute virtuosité, for piano
- 1936: 6 pièces en forme de suite, for violin and piano
- 1936: Poème, for piano and cello
- 1940: Album d'images, for piano
- 1940–1941: 2 divertissements, for piano (Max Eschig)
- 1940–1941: Préludes baroques, for piano
- 1941: Préambule pour le "Chapeau chinois" de Franc Nohain, for piano, string quintet, flute, clarinet in B-flat
- 1941: Préambule pour le "Chapeau chinois" de Franc Nohain, for piano, violin and cello
- 1942: Sonata for piano
- 1942: Sonata for violin and piano
- 1943: 3 Préludes baroques, for 2 pianos (author's transcription)
- 1943: Miniatures, for violin and piano [lost piano part]
- 1943: Suite fantasque, for piano
- 1944: Deïrdre des douleurs, for flute and piano (transcription by the author)
- 1944: Deïrdre des douleurs, version for chamber orchestra
- 1944: La mort et le pendu, for grand orchestre
- 1945: Burlesque, for clarinet in B flat and String Quartet
- 1945: Burlesque for piano and clarinet in B-flat (transcription by the author)
- 1945: Mirages, for oboe and piano
- 1946: Thème et variation, for piano
- 1948: La mort et le pendu, for 2 pianos (author's transcription)
- 1948: La mort et le pendu, for 4-handed piano
- 1948: Poulenc-adagietto, for 2 pianos (transcription)
- 1948: Prière, for piano
- 1948: Prières, for string quartet
- 1949: 1st Piano Quartet
- 1949: Baptême, for flute and piano (transcription by the author)
- 1949: Baptême, for piano, flute, oboe, violin, cello and harp (premiere with Lily Laskine)
- 1949: Sonata for piano and cello
- 1950: Petite suite Radio française, for piano
- 1950: Petites pièces, for piano
- 1950: Petite suite Radio-française "dans l'esprit" des vieux contes français, for grand orchestre (commissioned by Radio-France; premiered by Manuel Rosenthal)
- 1951: Divertissement, for chamber orchestra (commission by Radio-France)
- 1951: Divertissement, for piano, 2 violins, cello, double bass and drums
- 1951: Divertissement, for violin and piano (author's transcription)
- 1951: Dona Rosita ou le langage des fleurs, for piano, 2 violins and cello (transcription by the author)
- 1951: Dona Rosita ou le langage des fleurs, for voice and piano
- 1951: Trois songes, for large orchestra (commissioned by the State)
- 1951: 4 impromptus, for piano
- 1952: Concerto pour piano et orchestre (commissioned by the State; premiered by Vlado Perlemuter)
- 1952: Polka, for 4-handed piano (transcription by the author; Dona Rosita)
- 1953: Dance for piano and saxophone in Eb (Billaudot; premiered by Vlado Perlemuter)
- 1953: Rossini-boutique-fantasque, for 2 pianos (transcription)
- 1953: Une fausse gavotte, for piano and clarinet in B-flat (Billaudot)

== Recordings ==
- René Herbin: 1st Quartet for piano and string trio, Élisabeth Herbin, piano; Alexis Galpérine, violin; Bruno Pasquier, viola; Mark Drobinsky cello (+ Florent Schmitt: Légende, String quartet Les Hasards), CD – 711, Éd. Gallo, 1993

== External links and sources ==
- Biography
- Dedicated website
- René Herbin discography at Discogs
- Presentation leaflet of the above-mentioned CD, texts by Pierrette Germain and Alexis Galpérine
- René Herbin, Piano Quartet No. 1: I. Rustique at YouTube
