= Protopapas (surname) =

Protopapas (Πρωτόπαπας) is a Greek surname, derived from the ecclesiastical office of protopapas. The female form is Protopapa (Πρωτόπαπα). People with the name include:

- Kostis Protopapas, Greek-American conductor
- George Protopapas (born 2003), CEO of Cavecrack
- Maria Protopapa (born 1971), Greek runner
- Vangelis Protopapas (1917–1995), Greek actor
