= Mount Cimet =

Mountain in France

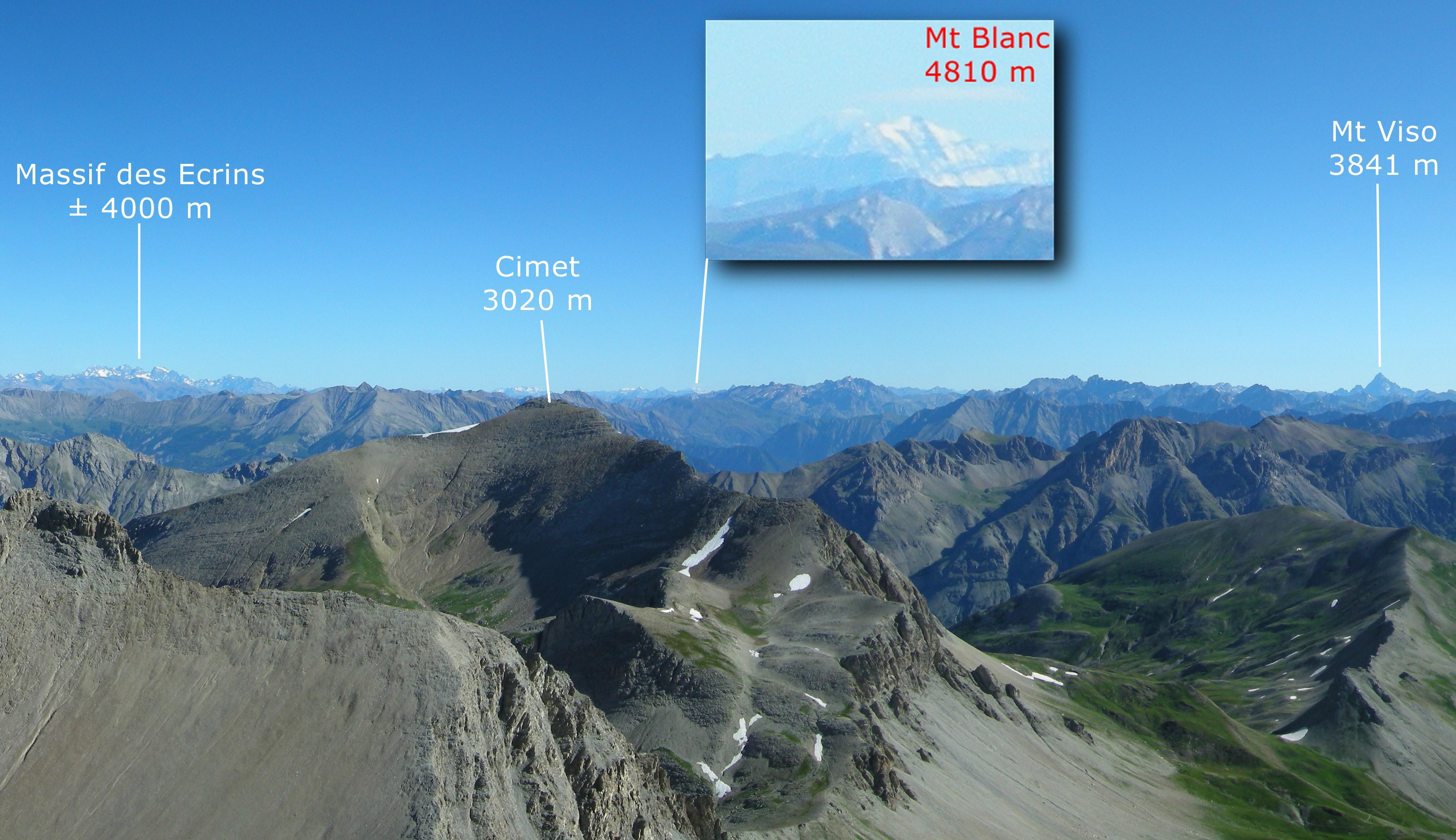
- View of Mount Cimet (center left of the picture) from the top of Mont Pelat.

Highest point
- Elevation: 3,020 m (9,910 ft)
- Prominence: 342 m (1,122 ft)
- Listing: Alpine mountains above 3000 m
- Coordinates: 44°17′26″N 6°42′15″E

Geography
- Location within France
- Location: Alpes-de-Haute-Provence, France
- Parent range: Maritime Alps

Mount Cimet or Cemet is a mountain in the Pelat Massif of the French Alps in Alpes-de-Haute-Provence.

Two high-profile crashes have occurred on the mountain. On the night of 1 September 1953, an Air France Lockheed L-749 Constellation, registered in France as F-BAZZ, also known as Air France Flight 178, which was flying from Paris-Orly Airport to Nice Airport, crashed into the top of the mountain, with the loss of 42 lives, including pianist René Herbin and violinist Jacques Thibaud. On 24 March 2015, Germanwings Flight 9525 crashed close to Mount Cimet, killing all passengers on board.
