= Beverly Bower =

American operatic soprano (1925–2002)

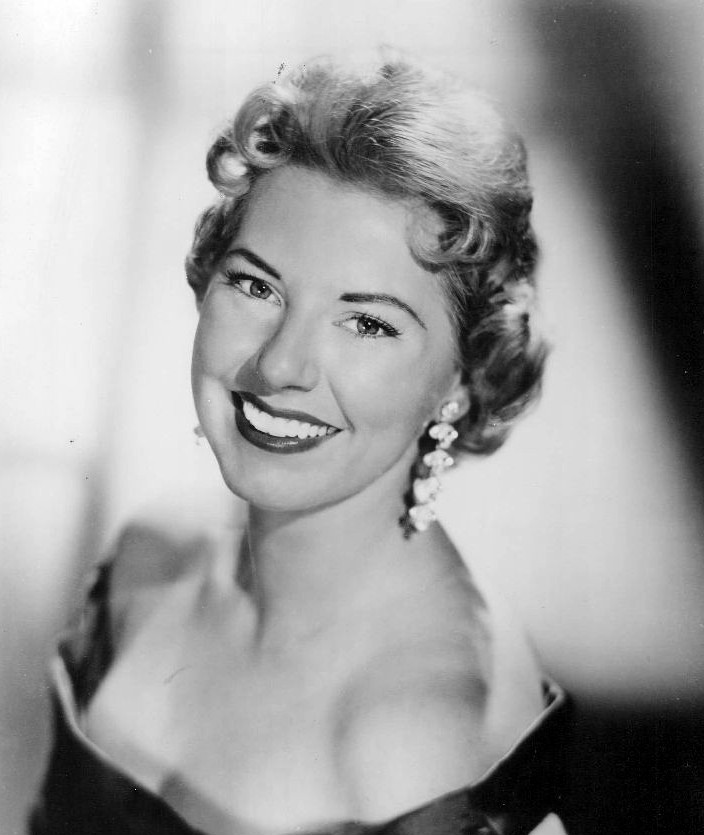
Beverly Bower in 1964.

Beverly Bower (September 30, 1925 – March 24, 2002) was an American operatic soprano who had an active international opera career from the mid-1950s through the early 1970s. She began her opera career at the New York City Opera where she sang between 1956 and 1963. She later worked mainly as a freelance artist with important opera companies throughout the United States and with a few opera companies in Europe.

Possessing a warm lyrical voice with a considerable amount of power and dexterity, Bower was able to sing an unusually broad repertoire. She tackled coloratura soprano roles like Fiordiligi in Wolfgang Amadeus Mozart's Così fan tutte and Violetta in Giuseppe Verdi's La traviata, lyric soprano roles like Micaëla in Georges Bizet's Carmen and Hanna Glawari in Franz Lehár's The Merry Widow, and spinto soprano roles like the title heroines in Giacomo Puccini's Madama Butterfly and Tosca. She even spent three years at the Metropolitan Opera singing mainly Wagnerian soprano roles.

== Early life and education ==
Born in Olean, New York in 1925, Beverly was the daughter of Archie and Esther Bowser. Her first musical experiences were at the First Presbyterian Church of Olean where her family attended. At the young age of three she was already singing solos during church services. Bower's family further fostered her musical talent by enrolling her in piano and voice lessons at the age of seven with Olean native Henry Hill.

In 1941 Bower won a scholarship to the famed Chautauqua Institute. In 1943 she moved to Philadelphia, Pennsylvania to study voice privately under Clarence Reinhart, one of her principal teachers over the next sixteen years. During this time she also studied foreign languages, drama, and opera at the University of Pennsylvania and was mentored by famed soprano Helen Jepson who bequeathed many of her costumes to Bower after her retirement from the stage.

== Career ==
Bower began her professional career singing on radio and television during the 1950s, including making appearance with Jack Paar on The Tonight Show. She made her professional opera debut in 1956 as Violetta in Verdi's La traviata at the New York City Opera (NYCO) with Barry Morell as Alfredo. The NYCO became her principal home through 1963. Her many roles at that house included Diana in Jacques Offenbach's Orpheus in the Underworld, Donna Anna in Mozart's Don Giovanni, Fiordiligi in Mozart's Così fan tutte, Hanna Glawari in Lehár's The Merry Widow, Konstanze in Mozart's Die Entführung aus dem Serail, Micaëla in Bizet's Carmen, Miss Pinkerton in Gian Carlo Menotti's The Old Maid and the Thief, Musetta in Giacomo Puccini's La Bohème, Rosalinde in Richard Strauss's Die Fledermaus, and the title role in Menotti's Amelia Goes to the Ball among others. She also notably portrayed The Woman in the first professional production of Mark Bucci's Tale for a Deaf Ear at the NYCO on April 6, 1958.

While singing at the NYCO, Bower would also occasionally perform with other opera companies and musical organizations. In 1959 she was one of the main featured artists at the Summer Music Festival at the Brevard Music Center. In 1961 she made her debut with the Philadelphia Lyric Opera Company as Musetta with Nicoletta Panni as Mimì, Angelo Lo Forese as Rodolfo, and Benjamin Rayson as Marcello. She left the NYCO to sing at the Vienna State Opera under Herbert von Karajan for the 1963–1964 season. She also made her debut with the Santa Fe Opera in the summer of 1963 as Rosalinda in Die Fledermaus. In 1964 she made her debut with the Central City Opera in the title role of Puccini's Madama Butterfly.

In 1965 Bower was invited by Rudolf Bing to join the roster of sopranos at the Metropolitan Opera. She made her debut with the company on February 22, 1965 as Ortlinde in Richard Wagner's Die Walküre with Birgit Nilsson as Brünnhilde, Jon Vickers as Siegmund, Leonie Rysanek as Sieglinde, George London as Wotan, and Irene Dalis as Fricka. She remained at the Met for three years, singing such roles as Senta in Wagner's Der fliegende Holländer, Micaëla, and Musetta. She notably sang the role of Minnie in La Fanciulla del West for the first public performance at the new Metropolitan Opera House at Lincoln Center on April 11, 1966. The production was attended by 3,000 high school students. Her voice is preserved on one Metropolitan Opera radio broadcast from 4 February 1967 in which she sang Musetta to the Mimi of Teresa Stratas.

Bower joined Sarah Caldwell's American National Opera Company for their 1967-1968 tour where she sang Alice Ford in Verdi's Falstaff and the title role in Tosca with Tommy Rall as Cavaradossi and George Fourie as Scarpia. She also sang Tosca for Caldwell's Opera Company of Boston in 1968 with Ray Abizu as Cavaradossi.

== Later life ==
In the early 1970s Bower retired from the stage for health reasons. After her retirement she worked as a voice teacher and was a longtime board member of the New Jersey Pro Arte Chorale. She was married for many years to John C. Kaufmann with whom she had one son, Mark D. Kaufmann. She died of cancer in 2002, aged 76 at her home in Washington Township, Bergen County, New Jersey.
