= Maria Golovin =

Opera by Gian Carlo Menotti

- Opera by Gian Carlo Menotti
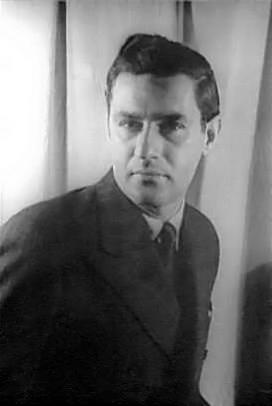
- The composer in 1944
- Librettist: Menotti
- Language: English
- Premiere: August 20, 1958; Expo '58, Brussels

Maria Golovin is an English language opera in three acts by Gian Carlo Menotti. It is through-composed and centers on a romantic encounter between a blind recluse named Donato and the title character, a married woman living in a European country a few years after a war. The work was commissioned by Peter Herman Adler of the NBC Opera Theatre.

Its first performance was at the International Exposition Pavilion Theater at Expo '58 in Brussels on 20 August 1958. Later that year, David Merrick and the NBC Opera mounted a Broadway production billed as a "musical drama." It was staged by Menotti and ran for five performances at the Martin Beck Theatre. The cast included Patricia Neway, Ruth Kobart, Norman Kelley, William Chapman, and Richard Cross, who won the 1959 Theatre World Award for his performance. Maria Golovin is not part of the usual operatic repertory and rarely is performed today, although The Paley Center for Media (Museum of Television & Radio) in New York scheduled a screening of the 1959 NBC Opera production of the work, starring Franca Duval, Richard Cross, and Patricia Neway, for May 21, 2011 at 2 p.m. followed by a discussion with Richard Cross.

== Roles ==
| Role | Voice type | Premiere Cast, 20 August 1958 (Conductor: Gian Carlo Menotti) |
|---|---|---|
| Agata | mezzo-soprano | Ruth Kobart |
| Donato | bass-baritone | Richard Cross |
| Dr Zuckertanz | tenor | Herbert Handt |
| The mother | contralto | Patricia Neway |
| Maria Golovin | soprano | Franca Duval |
| Trottolo, her son | boy soprano | Lorenzo Muti |
| A prisoner | baritone | William Chapman |

== Critical reception ==
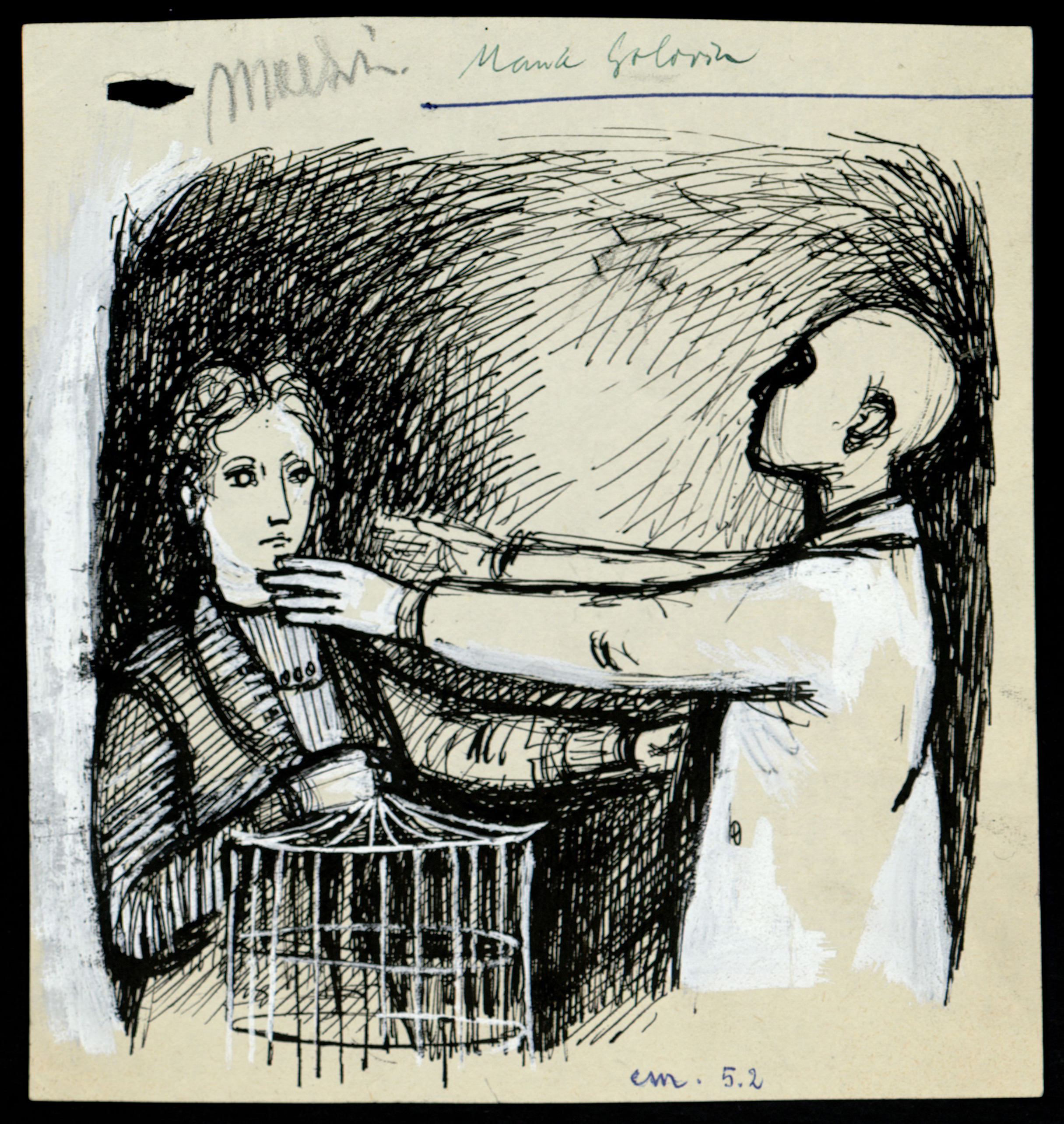
Illustration for the libretto of Maria Golovin. Archivio Storico Ricordi.

Time described it as "something of a disappointment" and added, "the impact is marred by banalities of speech ... and the hero's unsympathetic character." Of the music it said, "At its worst, the Golovin score is not only too sweet but too facile ... At its best, the score is hauntingly tender and compelling." There were also some favourable reviews: "This is a love story that should touch the hearts of sentimentalists," wrote critic Howard Taubman in the New York Times following the world premiere in Brussels. "The find of the production is Richard Cross, who sings and plays the blind man with force and compassion ... Franca Duval is personally attractive, musically intelligent and touchingly vulnerable as Maria Golovin."

== Recordings ==
A cast album was released by RCA Victor and reissued on CD by Naxos Historical in 2011.

== Performances ==
As well as the first performance at the International Exposition Pavilion Theater at Expo '58 in Brussels on 20 August 1958, it was performed at the London Coliseum in 1976, with Gian Carlo Menotti conducting, Alison Hargan playing the title role, with her real-life son James playing Trottolo Golovin.
