= Herbert Handt =

American opera singer (1926–2023)

Herbert John Handt (May 26, 1926 – October 2, 2023) was an American operatic tenor and later conductor, particularly known for his conducting and editions of rarely performed Italian scores. Handt was born in Philadelphia, Pennsylvania, and studied at the Juilliard School of Music and the Vienna Academy of Music. He made his debut as a singer at the Vienna State Opera in 1949 and his debut as a conductor in Rome in 1960. In the U.S., he sang with Arturo Toscanini conducting.

He moved to Lucca, Italy, in the early 1960s. As a conductor, he worked at major theatres in Italy, including La Scala in Milan and the Teatro Massimo in Palermo, and abroad. He founded the Associazione Musicale Lucchese in Lucca in 1964, serving as its Artistic Director to 2006, and becoming its Honorary President then. In 1978, he founded there the International Festival of Marlia, fusing events of opera, dance, theatre, conferences and concerts. He contributed to the restoration and enhancement of the Theatre of the Reassured in Montecarlo.

He was awarded honorary citizenship from Lucca (in 2002) and Montecarlo (in 2010) for his work for music and local culture, especially research of the rich musical history of Lucca, such as the Puccini dynasty. He received a prize by the City of Florence "for his commitment to improving cultural relations between Tuscany and the United States".

Handt died on October 2, 2023, at the age of 97.

== Roles created ==
In his career as a tenor, Handt created roles in three 20th-century operas:

- Don Giovanni Mediana in Malipiero's Venere prigioniera (Teatro della Pergola, Florence, 14 May 1957)
- Zuckertanz in Menotti's Maria Golovin (Theatre of the US Pavillon, Brussels World's Fair, 20 August 1958)
- Primo omuncolo in Roberto Lupi's Persefone (Teatro Comunale, Florence, 9 January 1970)
