= Thomas Young (tenor) =

American opera singer

Thomas Young is a Grammy and Clio-award winning American lyric tenor. His first appearance at New York City Opera was in the roles of Street and Elijah Muhammed in the world première performance of Anthony Davis's X, The Life and Times of Malcolm X. He made his Lyric Opera of Chicago debut in the world première of Amistad by the same composer, portraying the Trickster God. Davis then composed another role for Young in his opera Under the Double Moon, which received its première at the Opera Theatre of Saint Louis.

Young's other performances have included Aron in Schoenberg's Moses und Aron and Desportes in Zimmermann's Die Soldaten at City Opera; John Adams's The Death of Klinghoffer at San Francisco Opera; Schwalb in Hindemith's Mathis der Maler at The Royal Opera, Covent Garden; and Polo in Tan Dun's Marco Polo at the Hong Kong Festival, a role he created for the Biennale Festival (Munich).

He has sung under the batons of Marin Alsop, James Conlon, Dennis Russell Davies, Reinbert de Leeuw, Oliver Knussen, Zubin Mehta, Roger Norrington, Simon Rattle, Esa-Pekka Salonen, and Leonard Slatkin, among many others.

His performances of the standard operatic repertoire have included Stravinsky's Oedipus rex, Gounod's Faust, the U.S. premiere of Armida (as Rinaldo) with Tulsa Opera, Handel's Imeneo at New York City's Town Hall, and Gershwin's Porgy and Bess (as Sportin' Life) with Houston Grand Opera. He has also performed musical theater roles, including Judas in Jesus Christ Superstar, the title role in The Wiz, the Leading Player in Pippin, and Che in Evita.

Young has made numerous concert appearances with many major orchestras at venues that include Avery Fisher Hall, Alice Tully Hall, Brooklyn Academy of Music, and The Apollo. He has performed in jazz concerts with Tito Puente, Nancy Wilson, Clark Terry, Phil Woods, J. D. Perren, James Carter, Julius Hemphill, Mike Renze, Doc Cheatham, and Michael Wolff. Young performed with Ann-Margret at Caesars Palace in Las Vegas. He performs as part of the ensemble Cook Dixon and Young, formerly Three Mo' Tenors.

Young's many recordings include Nancy Wilson's album Life, Love, and Harmony, the Grammy Award-winning recording of William Bolcom's Songs of Innocence and of Experience with Leonard Slatkin; and Too Hot to Handel with Marin Alsop.

Young's television appearances have included: The Days and Nights of Molly Dodd, Aida's Brothers and Sisters, and the Mitch Miller Show. He performed at the Will Award Gala at the Shakespeare Theatre Company in Washington D.C. in honor of Judith Dench.

Young is the singing voice of Mighty Mouse in the animated series.

He is a professor of music at Sarah Lawrence College. He is married to the soprano Susan Eichhorn Young.
