= Air France Flight 178 =

1953 aviation accident

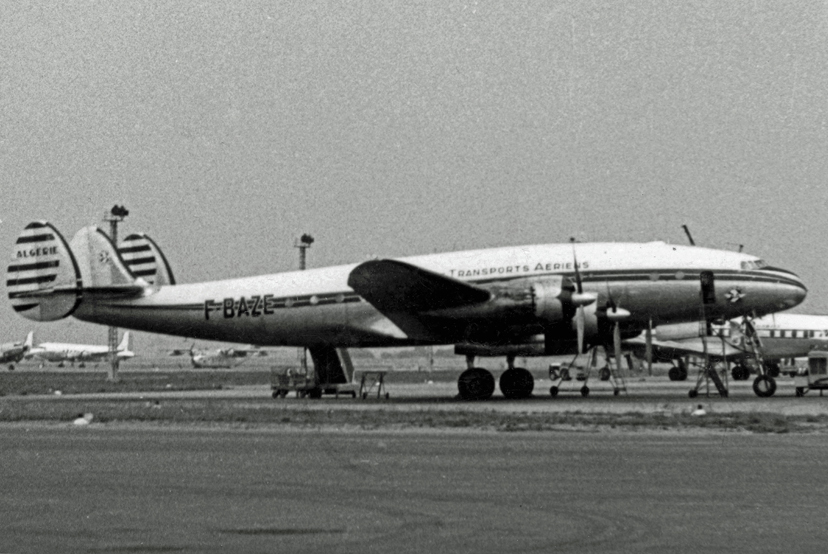
- A Lockheed L749A similar to the accident aircraft

Accident
- Date: 1 September 1953
- Summary: Unexplained navigation error, CFIT
- Site: Mont Le Cimet near Barcelonnette, France; 44°17′27.09″N 6°41′56.04″E

Aircraft
- Aircraft type: Lockheed L-749A Constellation
- Operator: Air France
- Registration: F-BAZZ
- Flight origin: Orly Airport, Paris, France
- 1st stopover: Nice Airport, France
- 2nd stopover: Beirut International Airport, Lebanon
- 3rd stopover: Baghdad, Iraq
- 4th stopover: Jinnah International Airport, Karachi, Pakistan
- Last stopover: Dum Dum Airport, India
- Destination: Tan Son Nhat International Airport, State of Vietnam
- Occupants: 42
- Passengers: 33
- Crew: 9
- Fatalities: 42
- Survivors: 0

On 1 September 1953, an Air France Lockheed L-749 Constellation, registered in France as F-BAZZ, flying Flight 178, a scheduled flight from Paris to Nice, crashed into the Pelat Massif in the French Alps near Barcelonnette on the first stage of the flight, between Orly Airport and Nice Airport.

All 42 on board were killed, nine crew and 33 passengers including the French violinist Jacques Thibaud and the French pianist René Herbin. Thibaud's Stradivarius was also lost in the crash.

== Aircraft ==
The aircraft was a four-engined Lockheed L-749 Constellation piston-engined airliner registered F-BAZZ, construction number 2674, that had first flown in 1951 in the United States and had been delivered to Air France on 18 July 1951.

== Accident ==
The Constellation had left Orly at 22:00 and was due at Nice at 23:55. At 23:25 the aircraft requested permission to descend from 13,600 ft (4 145 m) to 11,500 ft (3 505 m) and reported violent local storms. Around 23:30 villagers at Fours-St. Laurent saw the aircraft crash into the side of Mont Le Cimet, about ten miles (16 km) away. The aircraft struck the ground about 500 ft (150 m) below the summit and burst into flames.

A rescue party from Fours left about 90 minutes after the accident, but did not arrive at the scene until 5:25, they were joined by a doctor and nurse from Barcelonnette and two teams from the Chasseurs Alpins. The Chasseurs Alpins were equipped with radio and reported at 6:45 that no survivors had been found.

== Investigation ==
The accident investigation established "controlled flight into terrain (CFIT)" as the cause. The aircraft had 33 passengers, 30 bound for Saigon and 3 for Beirut. Three of the passengers were the 72-year-old French violinist Jacques Thibaud, his daughter-in-law and his accompanist. Thibaud's 1720 Stradivarius violin, "Thibaud", was also destroyed in the crash.

== See also ==
- List of accidents and incidents involving airliners by location § France
