= Mosconi Brothers =

American vaudeville dance act

The Mosconi Brothers were an American dance act in vaudeville, comprising Charles Steven Mosconi (January 1, 1892 – March 1, 1975) and Louis Camille Mosconi (May 11, 1895 – August 1, 1969).

The grandsons of a ballet master in Genoa, the brothers Charles and Louis Mosconi were born in Philadelphia. They were taught to dance by their father, Charles Mosconi Sr. (1868 – 1942), who set up a dance school there in 1908. The brothers began performing together on stage as children, and developed an act in which Louis dressed as Charlie Chaplin and Charles as Edna Purviance. They performed locally until 1918, when they first appeared at the Palace Theatre on Broadway in New York City.

They performed many times at the Palace Theatre over the next decade, claiming a record in playing there for 52 weeks over seven years. They perfected an energetic and acrobatic dance act in which one of the brothers would run as fast as possible up the vertical side of the stage set, and perform a backwards somersault to the ground. They became headliners around the country and internationally, topping the bill at the London Palladium, when they were billed as "The Eighth Wonder of the World". They also sometimes performed as part of the Mosconi Family, with their sister Verna (1899 – 1990), brother Willie (1901 – 1964), and father Charles Sr. The brothers Charles and Louis gave their final vaudeville performance in 1934.

Louis Mosconi opened a dance school in Hollywood, Los Angeles, which remained open until shortly before his death in 1969. Charles Mosconi later worked as a ticket broker in New York City, and died in 1975. Their cousin Willie Mosconi was a noted pool champion.
