= Rachel Steinman Clarke =

Polish violinist (c. 1882–1944)

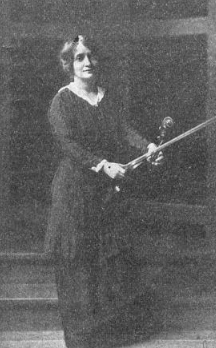
- Rachel Steinman Clarke, from a 1914 publication.
- Born: c. 1882; Włocławek, Poland
- Died: November 4, 1944; Miami, Florida, U.S.
- Occupation: Violinist

Rachel Steinman Clarke (c. 1882 – November 4, 1944) was a Polish-born American violinist based in Chicago.

== Early life ==
Rachel Steinman was born in Włocławek, Poland. Her family moved to the United States when Steinman was a child, and she was raised in Des Moines, Iowa, where she graduated from the Highland Park Conservatory of Music. She pursued further violin studies in Chicago and New York, and with Jacques Thibaud in Paris. Her sister Gertrude married actor Raymond Walburn.

== Career ==
Rachel Steinman was playing violin at Iowa events by 1900. She toured on the Chautauqua and lyceum circuits with the Midland Concert Company as a young woman, and as head of the Rachel Steinman Concert Company. She toured with her husband in the Edward Clarke Concert Company, from the 1910s into the 1920s. In 1917, for example, the Clarke company gave 142 concerts in 71 cities in 70 days, driving Clarke's Ford over 4,500 miles through Illinois, Iowa, Minnesota, and Wisconsin in the process.

Clarke was a member of the Chicago Civic Symphony Orchestra, and on the faculty of the Lyceum Arts Conservatory of Chicago. She also performed for radio concerts. "Miss Steinman is an exceedingly artistic violinist, playing with perfect self composure and so easily and gracefully as to inspire confidence in her music," commented one Iowa reviewer in 1911.

After moving to Florida in 1935, she was a member of the University of Miami Symphony Orchestra.

== Personal life ==
In 1913, Rachel Steinman married Charles Edward Clarke, a Canadian baritone singer, at a Baptist church in Chicago. She died in Miami, Florida in 1944.
