= Ruth Kobart =

American actress (1924–2002)

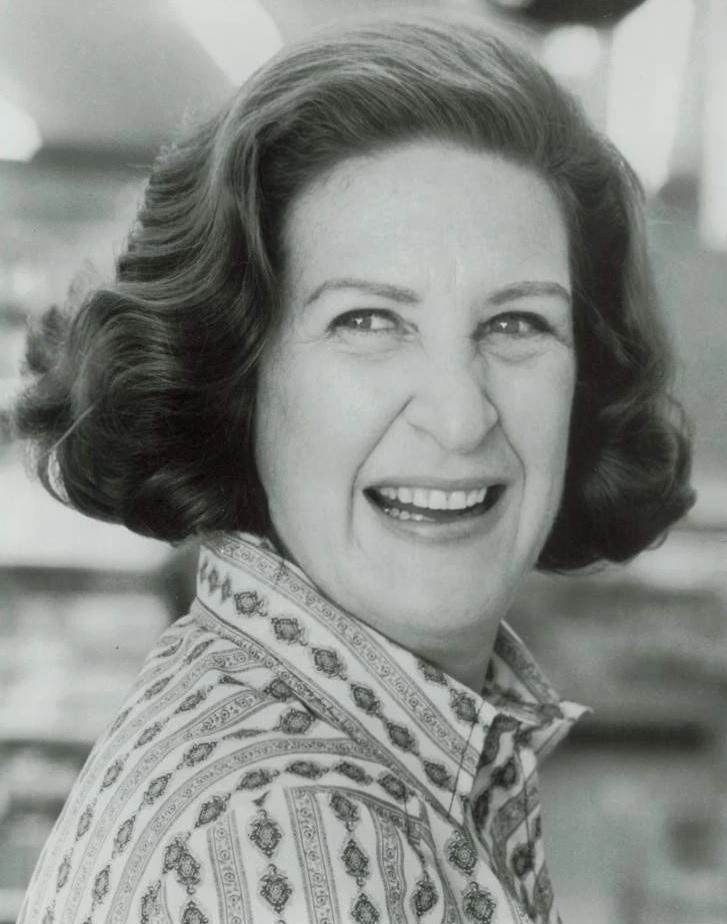
- Kobart in Annie (1981)
- Born: Ruth Maxine Kohn; April 24, 1924; Des Moines, Iowa, U.S.
- Died: December 14, 2002 (aged 78); San Francisco, California, U.S.
- Occupations: Actress; singer
- Years active: 1959–1995

Ruth Maxine Kohn (/kɑːn/ KAHN; (Note: In March 2004, more than 15 months after her death, a piece entitled "Famous Iowans", published with little fanfare in the Des Moines Register, includes a brief, offhand disclosure–"Kobart's two older brothers later took the name Kahn to reflect the pronunciation of the name"–that belatedly sheds some light on the question of Kobart's actual birth name, and the curious disconnect between that name's spelling and pronunciation; in short, it is spelled K-o-h-n, but evidently pronounced as if K-a-h-n, thus leaving Kobart's two siblings in a quandary. With adulthood rapidly approaching, and put in the position of constantly having to either correct people's pronunciation or hurriedly offer preemptive lecture/demonstrations, both of Kobart's siblings—Howard C. and soon-to-be Rabbi Robert I. Kohn—finally just threw in the towel, figuratively speaking, and traded in their old family name for the more familiar version. Hence, more than half a century later, the predictably misleading presence of survivor Howard S. Kahn in Kobart's 2002 obit.)) April 24, 1924 – December 14, 2002), known professionally as Ruth Kobart, was an American performer, whose six-decade career encompassed opera, Broadway musical theatre, regional theatre, films, and television.

== Life and career ==
Born Ruth Maxine Kohn on April 24, 1924, in Des Moines, Iowa, Kobart was youngest of three children born to Missouri native Sadie (née Finkelstein) and Lithuanian-born, Des Moines-based building contractor Morris Louis Kohn. She graduated from Roosevelt High School in Des Moines in 1942.She attended the American Conservatory of Music in Chicago where she earned a bachelor of music degree in 1945. She made her professional debut as the Witch in an off-Broadway production of Engelbert Humperdinck's Hänsel und Gretel.

On February 23, 1948, in Times Hall, Kobart gave her first New York recital. A review in The New York Times commented that her voice improved as the evening progressed, as "the richness in the middle registers spread through the whole voice" and later she had "top tones ringing out with splendid quality". Her debut with the New York City Opera (NYCO) occurred on April 11, 1958, as Augusta in The Ballad of Baby Doe.

She frequently toured with the NBC Opera Theatre (NBCOT) and the NYCO. With the NBCOT she notably created the role of Agata in the world premiere of Gian Carlo Menotti's Maria Golovin at the Expo '58 in Brussels on August 20, 1958; later the same year she portrayed the role on Broadway. For the NBC, she also created the role of Arina in the premiere of Bohuslav Martinů's The Marriage. She played Madame Pace in the world premiere of Hugo Weisgall's Six Characters in Search of an Author at the NYCO in 1959. Regarding her role as Madame Pernelle in Tartuffe at the Geary Theater, she wrote: "I had a big voice and a big body ... I came out on stage and shouted my head off, and believe it or not, I found my way."

In 1955, Kobart made her Broadway debut in the chorus of Rodgers and Hammerstein's Pipe Dream. She understudied leading lady Helen Traubel and played her role forty two times during the show's run. Additional Broadway credits included How to Succeed in Business Without Really Trying, A Funny Thing Happened on the Way to the Forum, A Flea in Her Ear, and Three Sisters. She was nominated for the 1963 Tony Award for Best Featured Actress in a Musical for Forum.

Kobart's association with San Francisco's American Conservatory Theater began with its first season in 1967 and lasted through 1994. Her appearances with them included The House of Bernarda Alba, Sunday in the Park with George, Arsenic and Old Lace, A Little Night Music, and Home.

In the 1970s she took an extended leave from the company to portray Nurse Ratched in the 18-month-long San Francisco production of One Flew Over the Cuckoo's Nest. Her national tour credits included Forty Carats, The Last of the Red Hot Lovers, and Annie. She portrayed Miss Hannigan on the first tour of Annie and in a long Chicago run (in succession to originator Dorothy Loudon).

She voiced the main villain, Malicia, in the 1994 video game King's Quest VII.

Kobart was Jewish and was a member of the Temple Israel of Hollywood.

== Films and television ==
On screen she appeared in the feature film adaptation of How to Succeed, as well as Petulia, Dirty Harry, The Hindenburg, and Sister Act and Sister Act 2: Back in the Habit. Her television credits include a regular role on Bob (which starred Bob Newhart) and guest appearances on The Streets of San Francisco, CHiPs, Archie Bunker's Place, St. Elsewhere, Matt Houston, Remington Steele, Midnight Caller, and Murphy Brown. She portrayed the hijacked school bus driver in Dirty Harry.

== Death ==
Kobart died of pancreatic cancer at her home in San Francisco, California, aged 78, seven months after being diagnosed with the illness. Predeceased, just barely, by her eldest of her two brothers, Dr. Robert I. Kahn, Rabbi of Houston, she was survived by the other, Howard S. Kahn of Minneapolis, as well as by six nieces and nephews.

== Filmography ==
Year	Title	Role	Notes
1967	How to Succeed in Business Without Really Trying	Miss Jones	
1968	Petulia	Nun	
1971	Dirty Harry	Marcella Platt, Bus Driver	
1975	The Hindenburg	Hattie	Uncredited
1992	Sister Act	Choir Nun #7	
1993	Sister Act 2: Back in the Habit	Choir Nun #7	
