= Consuelo Escobar =

Mexican soprano, teacher and businesswoman

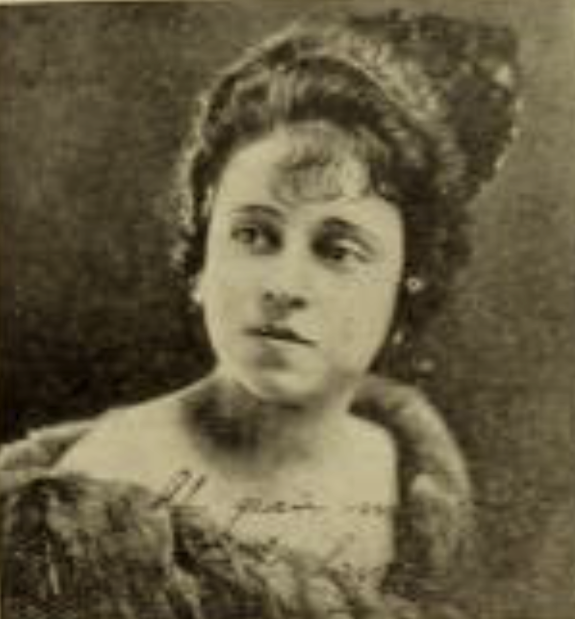
Consuelo Escobar in 1924.

Consuelo Escobar (San Luis Potosí, November 19, 1887 – October 30, 1967) was a Mexican soprano, teacher and businesswoman.

== Biography ==
Escobar studied at the National Conservatory of Music, Mexico, and had Antonia Ochoa as singing teacher. After her graduation, she went to Italy where she was a student of Cottone teacher.

On her return to Mexico, in 1910, she debuted at the Arbeu Theater in the world premiere of the Mexican opera Nicolás Bravo, with libretto by Ignacio Mariscal, secretary of Foreign Affairs of the Porfirista cabinet, and music by Rafael J. Tello, playing María. With this composer she participated in the Compañía de Ópera Popular (1915) and at that time she joined the lyrical cuatro of the Compañía Impulsora de Ópera of José Pierson, with which she sang several times in the theaters Iris, Arbeu, Politeama and Nacional. Later, she was hired by the San Carlo Opera Company and the Ravigna Park of Chicago, with which she toured the United States in places such as Texas and New York, performing alongside figures such as Titta Ruffo and Rosa Raisa.

In the early years of the 1920s she created her own opera company, Compañía Consuelo Escobar, with which she performed numerous times in the country. Her husband, tenor Carlos Castro, and her sister, soprano María Luisa Escobar de Rocabruna also participated. During this period they made recordings in the United States in the Edison company.

Her repertoire included characters from the operas Carmen, Dinorah, Don Pasquale, Il barbiere di Siviglia, L'elisir d'amore, La sonnambula, La traviata, Les contes d'Hoffman, Les pêcheurs de perles, Lucia di Lammermoor and Rigoletto. Her last recorded performance was in 1932 at the Teatro Esperanza Iris (currently called Teatro de la Ciudad) where she sang in Il barbiere di Siviglia.

The last years of her life she dedicated them to teaching. She was teacher of bel canto at the CNM (Conservatorio Nacional de Música) and was part of the editorial staff of the Cultural Musical magazine at the same conservatory. Her academic articles deal with musical pedagogy, vocal technique, critiques of opera presentations, and other topics related to her musical work. Among her disciples was singer Evangelina Magaña.
