= Kostis Protopapas =

Kostis Protopapas is a Greek-born American symphony and opera conductor, currently serving as the artistic director of Opera Santa Barbara.

== Life and career ==
From 2008 until 2016 he was the artistic director of Tulsa Opera in Tulsa, Oklahoma, where he had previously served as associate conductor and chorusmaster. During his 15-year tenure with the company, Protopapas conducted 30 productions of a diverse repertoire extending from popular classics like La Boheme, Carmen and Pagliacci to contemporary American works like Elmer Gantry, Of Mice and Men and A Streetcar Named Desire. About his 2011 Barber of Seville performances, Alex Ross of The New Yorker wrote "Most impressive was the fluid idiomatic playing of the orchestra… In any city, it's rare to find a conductor that sets the right tempo so consistently that you stop noticing he's there." In 2014 his contract was renewed through 2017, however he resigned his post in March 2016

Protopapas has served as assistant conductor for the Los Angeles Opera the Lyric Opera of Chicago and Santa Fe Opera. During the 2002 and 2003 seasons he was the assistant chorusmaster at Lyric Opera of Chicago, under Donald Palumbo.

Protopapas has served on the music staffs of Opera Memphis and Virginia Opera; he conducted at Opera in the Ozarks every summer from 2000 to 2004, and has conducted for Des Moines Metro Opera, Opera Columbus and Union Avenue Opera in St. Louis.

Born in Athens, Greece, in 1971, Protopapas studied archaeology and history of art at the University of Athens. He came to the United States in 1993 on an Onassis Foundation scholarship to study piano at The Boston Conservatory and conducting at Boston University.
