= Doris Jung Popper =

American operatic singer (1924–2025)

- Born: Doris Crittenden; January 5, 1924; Centralia, Illinois, U.S.
- Died: September 21, 2025 (aged 101); Dallas, Texas, U.S.
- Education: University of Illinois Urbana-Champaign; Mannes School of Music; Henry Street Settlement Music School; Vienna State Academy of Music and Performing Arts
- Occupation: Operatic soprano
- Spouse: Felix Popper

Doris Jung Popper, née Doris Crittenden (January 5, 1924 – September 21, 2025) was an American operatic soprano.

She was born in Centralia, Illinois and graduated from Centralia High School in 1941. She then went to Centralia Junior College, being one of the first to attend the newly formed school. In 1943, she began her studies at the University of Illinois Urbana-Champaign. She also attended the Mannes School of Music, the Henry Street Settlement Music School, and the Vienna State Academy of Music and Performing Arts as a Fulbright Scholar.

After a start in Greenwich Village in 1953, she performed at the Zurich Opera in 1955 and subsequently in Germany until 1969, when she returned to the US and performed at the New York City Opera and Carnegie Hall. Over the course of her career, she also performed at the Liceu in Barcelona, Spain and the Opéra de Marseille in France. A 1972 review of her role as Marschallin Der Rosenkavalier by Richard Strauss for the New York City Opera described her as "a thoughtful and sensitive artist."

According to Opera, "she became an influential figure in vocal education in New York, continuing as a teacher and mentor until 2021."

Jung married Felix Popper, an Austrian conductor and administrator with the New York City Opera. She died on September 21, 2025, in Dallas, Texas at age 101, making her a centenarian.
