= The Marriage (Martinů) =

- Comic opera by Bohuslav Martinů
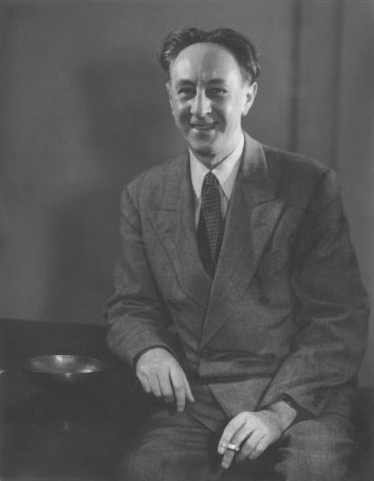
- Martinů in 1945
- Librettist: Martinů
- Language: English
- Based on: Marriage by Nikolai Gogol
- Premiere: 31 March 1954; Hamburg State Opera

The Marriage (Czech: Ženitba) is a comic opera in 2 acts by Bohuslav Martinů, to the composer's own libretto, after the play of the same name by Nikolai Gogol. The opera was commissioned for television by the NBC, and the NBC Opera Theatre performed the work's world premiere on their television program NBC TV Opera Theatre for a national broadcast in the United States on 2 July 1953. The opera has subsequently been adapted for the stage and recorded on CD.

== Television premiere ==
Martinů was first approached to compose an opera for the NBC Opera Theatre by the company's Artistic Director, the conductor Peter Herman Adler, and their executive producer, Samuel Chotzinoff. Martinů had already been contemplating setting Gogol's play to music, and his suggestion to Adler and Chotzinoff was readily accepted. Martinů commenced on writing both the music and the libretto. Although the NBC announced that they were mounting a new opera with music by Martinů, they refused to disclose to the press who the author of the libretto was prior to the premiere. Olin Downes of The New York Times described this lack of disclosure as a "dense secret". Of the libretto Downes stated, "The book is effective, funny without being cheap, and it preserves a folk quality with whatever modern colloquialisms are woven in. The simple flavor of the original is not lost."

At its 1953 television premiere, The Marriage was a triumphant success. As usual with almost all of the NBC Opera Theatre productions, Chotzinoff served as producer and Adler served as music director/conductor. John Block directed the production, Otis Riggs designed the sets, and Liz Gillan designed the costumes. Downes wrote in his review that "The production was of an excellent quality in the 1840s Russian costumes and scenic designs, and in the admirable level of the singing and English Diction. The show was produced and directed by master hands, in a way that would have made a less interesting score, less well designed for television presentation, worth while." Downes further praised Martinů for his successful marriage of the music with the text, stating the work "has droll characterization, adroit instrumental commentary, and certain motival phrases that bind the beginning and the end of the opera amazingly together."

== Stage productions ==
The Marriage was first performed in a live theatrical production on 31 March 1954, at the Hamburg State Opera, Germany, when it was conducted by Horst Stein. A revised version of the opera premiered was premiered by Theater Bonn on 21 September 1989 with Udo Zimmermann conducting.

== Roles ==
Role	Voice type	Premiere cast, 7 February 1953 (Conductor: Peter Herman Adler)
Podkolyosin, a government official and bachelor	baritone	Donald Gramm
Agafya, daughter of a merchant and spinster	soprano	Sonia Stollin
Kokhkaryov, Podkolyosin's friend	tenor	Michael Pollock
Fyokla Ivanovna, a matchmaker	mezzo-soprano	Winifred Heidt
Arina, Agafya's aunt	contralto	Ruth Kobart
Ivan, a government official	bass	Lloyd Harris
Anuchkin, a retired army officer	tenor	Andrew McKinley
Zhevakin, a retired naval officer	tenor	Robert Holland
Stepan, Podkolyosin's servant	spoken role	Leon Lishner
Dunyashka, Agafya and Arina's maid	spoken role	Anne Pitoniak

== Synopsis ==
The opera is set in St. Petersburg at the start of the 19th century. Fyokla suggests the 29-year-old Agafya to Podkolyosin for a bride. Kokhkyarov encourages him. They find Agafya attended by three feeble suitors. Both Agafya and Podkolyosin are diffident, so Kokhkyarov does all the talking in persuading each of the other's merits, eventually even proposing on behalf of Podkolyosin. Agafya accepts, but while she is dressing for the marriage, which they have decided must be immediate, Podkolyosin escapes through the window.

== Recording ==
Václav Nosek conducting the Brno Janáček Opera Orchestra, Supraphon SU-33792.
