= Theodore Harrison =

American opera singer

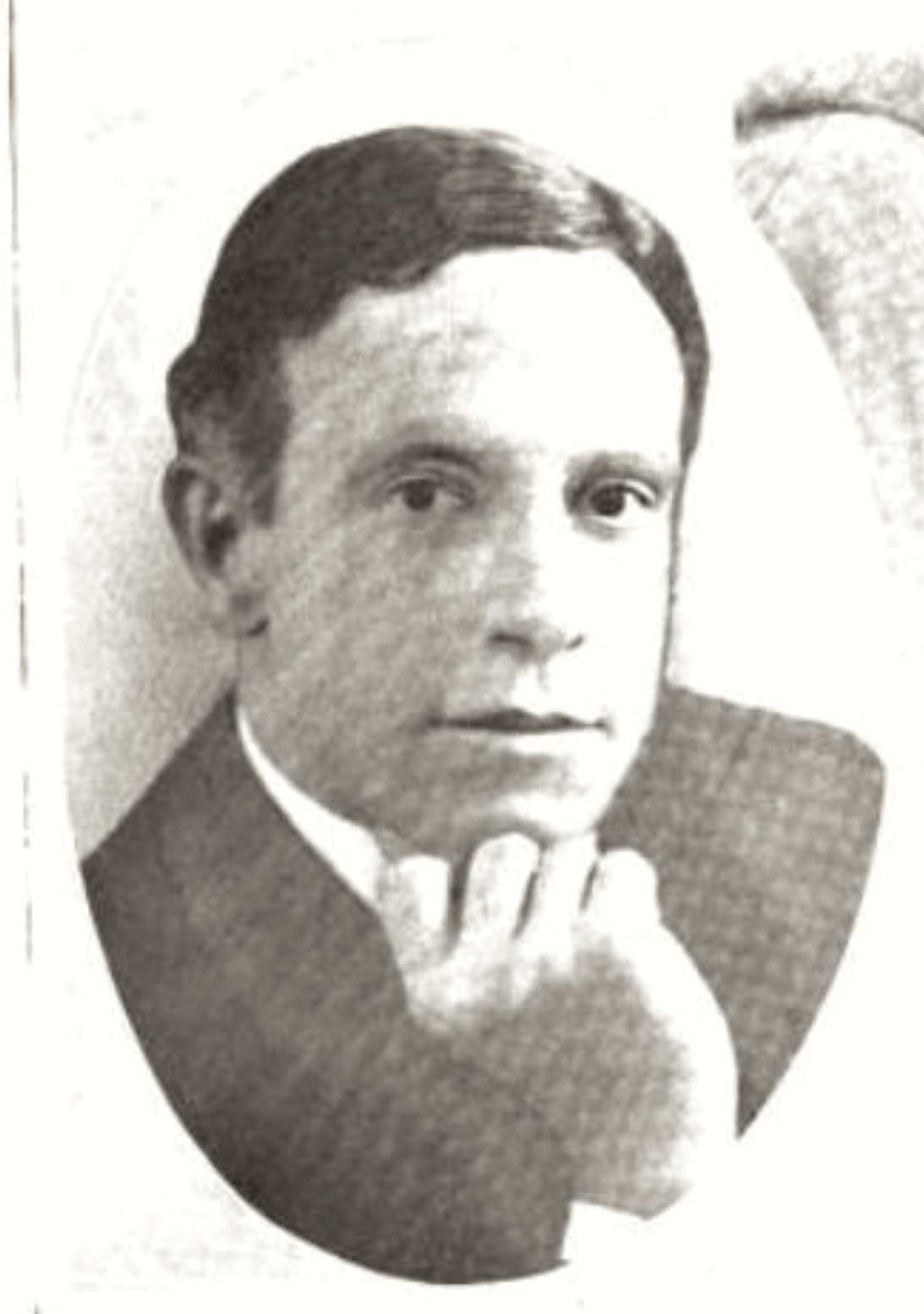
Theodore Harrison from the July 1915 front cover of The Musical Courier.

Theodore Harrison (1876-1965) was a Chicago-area concert baritone and choral conductor best known for his presence in the Chicago music community. Born in 1876, Harrison worked and taught in Chicago for his entire life. He spent most of his career teaching music at the American Conservatory of Music in Chicago. Prior to becoming a Conservatory faculty member, he conducted the Adult Chorus at the Hull House Music School and directed the First Congregational Church choir in Evanston, Illinois. Harrison also toured extensively during his early career, both domestically and internationally. During the World War I, he worked with the government to popularize morale-raising songs for soldiers training to go overseas. He married Donna Esselstyn, who often played as his accompanist. Theodore Harrison died in 1965.
