= Jacques Thibaud =

French violinist (1880–1953)

External audio
- Shellac recordings with Jacques Thibaud in the Online Archive of the Österreichische Mediathek

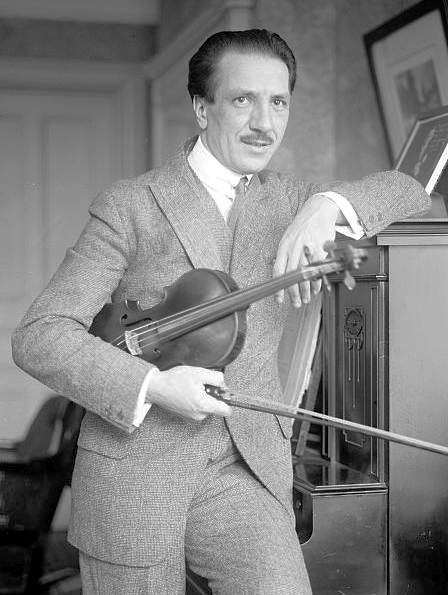
Jacques Thibaud

Jacques Thibaud (French pronunciation: [ʒak tibo]; 27 September 1880 – 1 September 1953) was a French violinist.

== Biography ==
Thibaud was born in Bordeaux and studied the violin with his father before entering the Paris Conservatoire at the age of thirteen. In 1896 he jointly won the conservatory's violin prize with Pierre Monteux (who later became a famous conductor). He had to rebuild his technique after being injured in World War I. In 1943 he and Marguerite Long established the Marguerite Long-Jacques Thibaud International Competition for violinists and pianists, which takes place each year in Paris. From 2011, it has included singers and is now known as the Long-Thibaud-Crespin Competition, in honour of the soprano Régine Crespin.

Thibaud was noted not only for his work as a soloist, but also for his performances of chamber music, particularly in a piano trio with the pianist Alfred Cortot and cellist Pablo Casals. He undertook concert tours with pianist Yves Nat and George Enescu. He was a friend of violinist Eugène Ysaÿe, who dedicated his 2nd Sonata for solo violin to him. Among his students were Manuel Quiroga (the dedicatee of Ysaÿe's 6th solo sonata), Eric Rosenblith, Joan Field, Rachel Steinman Clarke, Stephan Hero (see Jose Iturbi) and Yfrah Neaman.

On 1 September 1953, Jacques Thibaud tragically died in the crash of Air France Flight 178, along with all 41 other passengers. The aircraft, registered as F-BAZZ, was on its final approach to Nice when it struck Mount Cimet in the French Alps. Thibaud was traveling to a performance in Tokyo, and his prized 1720 Stradivarius violin was destroyed in the crash. The accident investigation established "controlled flight into terrain" as the cause.

== Bibliography ==
- Jacques Thibaud, Un violon parle : souvenirs de Jacques Thibaud (J-P Dorian ed., Ed. Blé qui lève, Paris, Lausanne, Montréal, 1947; Ed. del Duca, Paris, 1953).
- Roth, Henry (1997). Violin Virtuosos: From Paganini to the 21st Century. Los Angeles, CA: California Classics Books. ISBN 1-879395-15-0
- Baker's Biographical Dictionary of Musicians, Centennial Edition. Nicolas Slonimsky, Editor Emeritus. Schirmer, 2001
