= Elinor Ross =

American opera singer (1926–2020)

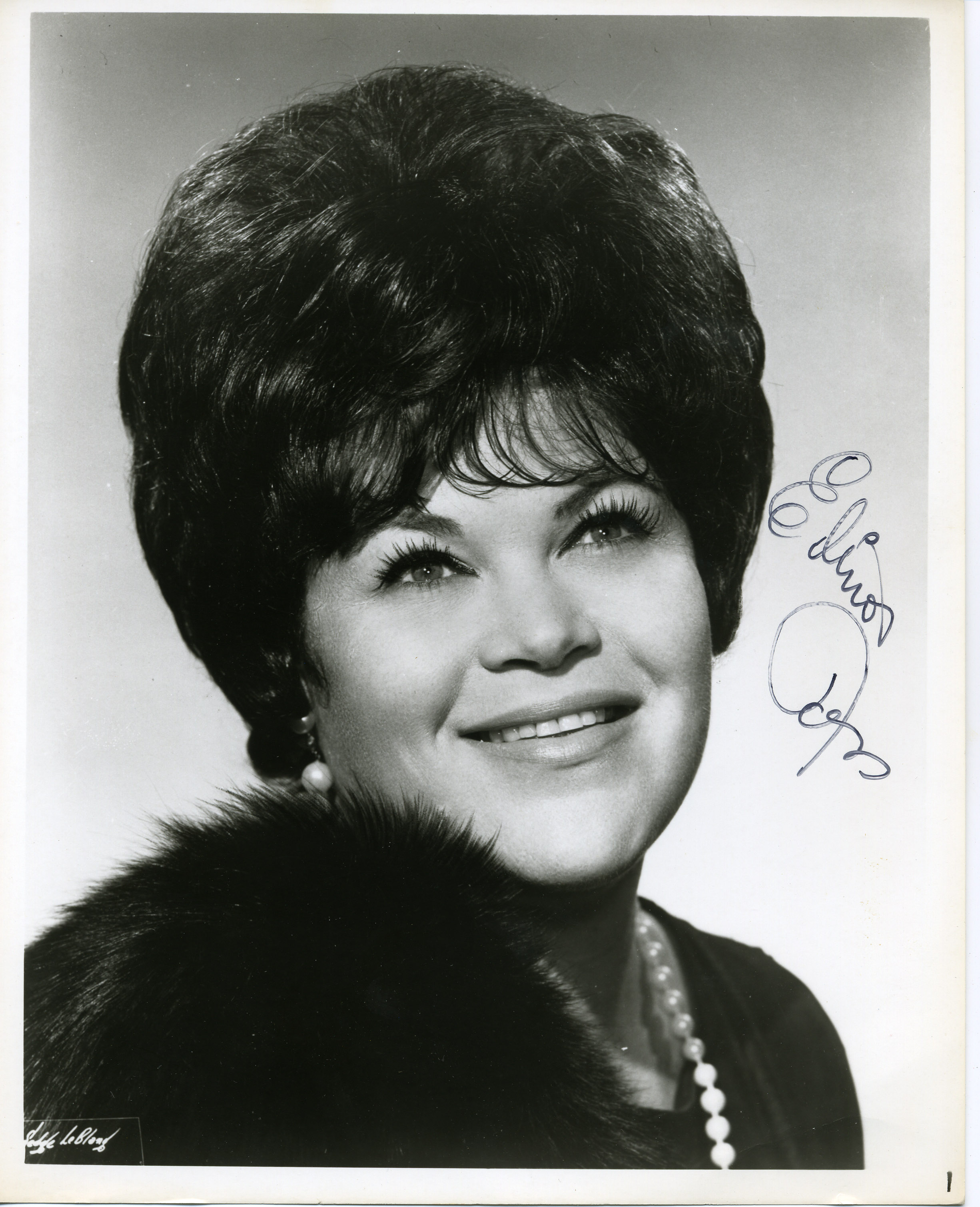
- Elinor Ross, publicity photo, 1960s
- Born: Elinor Marilyn Rosenthal; August 1, 1926; Tampa, Florida, U.S.
- Died: March 6, 2020 (aged 93); Manhattan, New York City
- Occupation: Operatic soprano
- Years active: 1958–1979

Elinor Ross (August 1, 1926 – March 6, 2020) was an American opera singer, a dramatic soprano particularly associated with the Italian repertory. She made an international career, appearing regularly at the Metropolitan Opera in New York City and at major opera houses in Europe and the Americas, in roles such as Puccini's Tosca and Turandot.

“Miss Ross has the dramatic metal of a Raisa, Ponselle, Traubel, Flagstad, or Nilsson!” – John Rosenfield, The Dallas Morning News

== Career ==
Born Elinor Marilyn Rosenthal in Tampa, Florida, Ross studied at Syracuse University, and later came to New York to study with William Herman, Stanley Sontag and Leo Resnick. She made her debut with the Lyric Opera of Chicago in 1958, as Leonora in Il trovatore, alongside Jussi Björling, Giulietta Simionato and Ettore Bastianini.

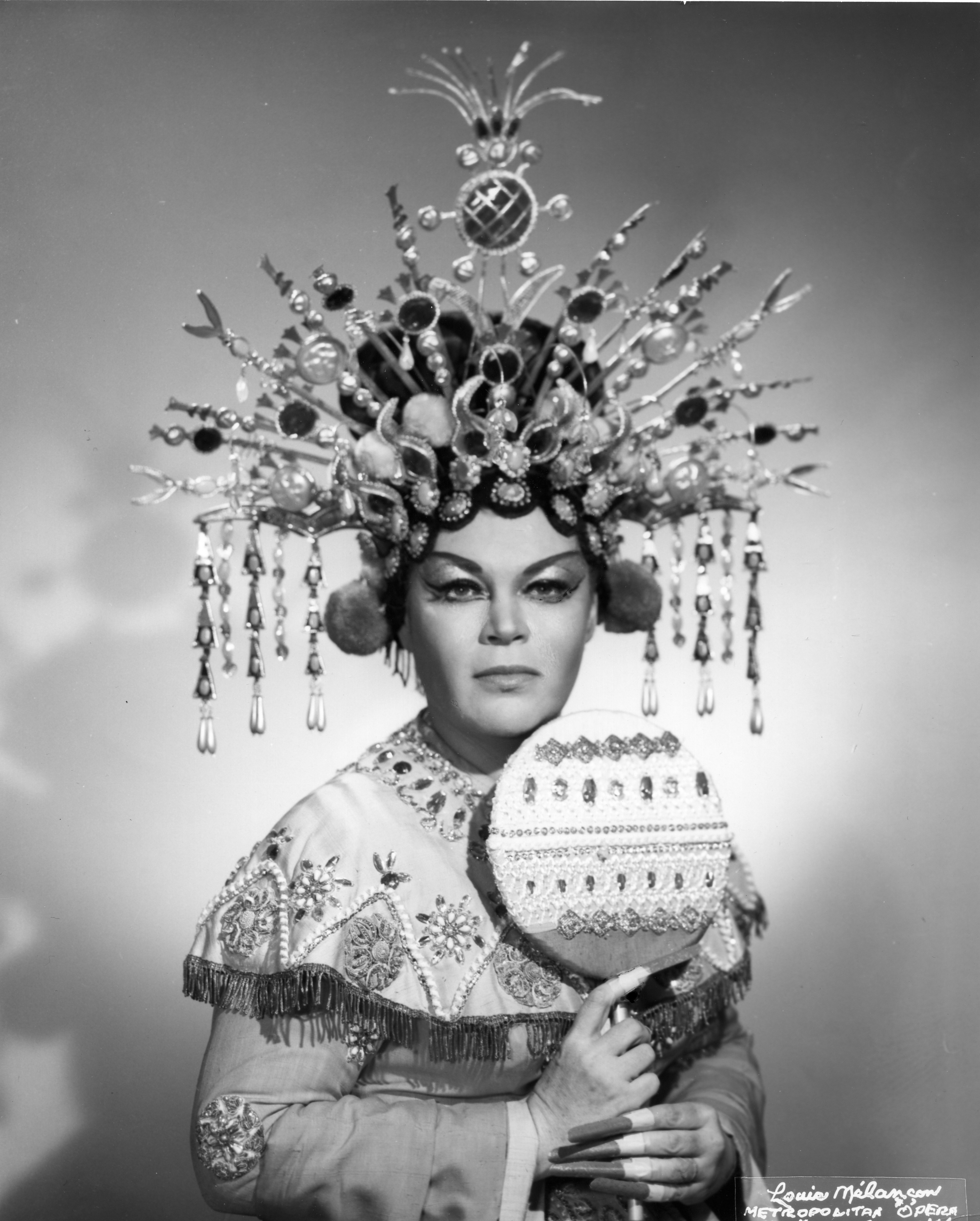
Elinor Ross in the title role of Turandot, Metropolitan Opera, 1970s

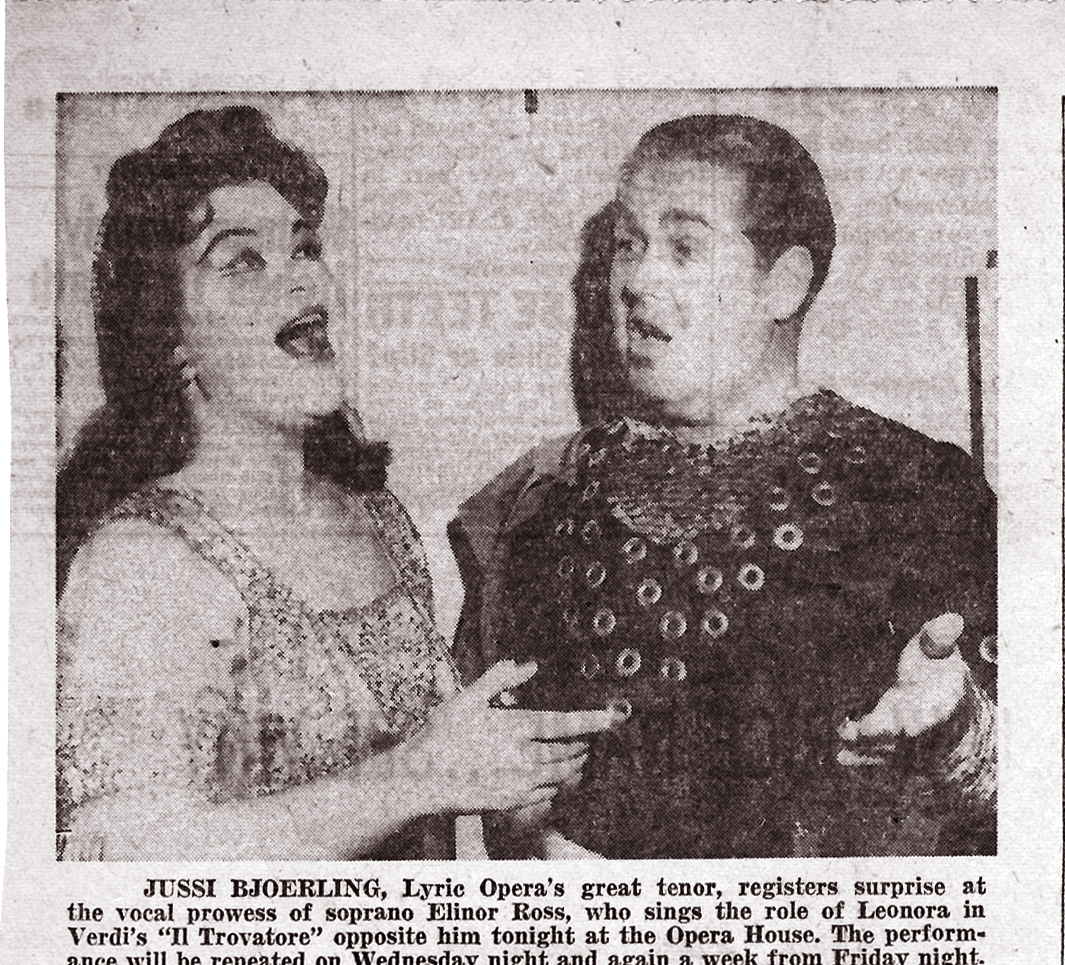
Ross with tenor Jussi Björling prior to her Lyric Opera of Chicago debut as Leonora in Il trovatore, 1958

In the summer of 1959, Ross sang the American premiere of Heitor Villa-Lobos’ “Songs of the Tropical Forest” under the composer’s baton. She went on to sing at the opera houses of Boston, Chicago, Baltimore, Philadelphia, San Francisco, New Orleans, Houston, and Hartford, among others. In 1968, she appeared at Carnegie Hall in New York, in the American premiere of Verdi's Alzira. She sang regularly at the Metropolitan Opera, first in 1970 in the title role of Puccini's Turandot, stepping in on short notice for Birgit Nilsson, alongside Franco Corelli as Calaf and Pilar Lorengar as Liu. A reviewer for The New York Times wrote:

Her voice is big and assertive in the upper range and it can be quite effective when put to powerhouse use. In this performance, however, it was not smoothly produced at all times nor equally attractive in all registers. Nevertheless, Miss Ross achieved a vocal and dramatic interpretation of the role of the haughtly princess that was substantial and admirable.

She also appeared at the Met as Donna Anna in Mozart's Don Giovanni, in the title role of Verdi's Aida, as Amelia in Un ballo in maschera, Elisabetta in Don Carlo, Lady Macbeth in Macbeth, Leonora in Il trovatore, Puccini's Tosca and Turandot, Ponchielli's Gioconda, and Santuzza in Mascagni's Cavalleria rusticana.

Ross also enjoyed a successful international career. In 1963, she made her European debut in London, singing under Carlo Maria Giulini in the Verdi Requiem, with Rita Gorr, Nicolai Gedda, and Nicolai Ghiaurov. Ross appeared at La Fenice in Venice as Bellini's Norma in 1965 and as Leonora in La forza del destino in 1967, and as Sinaïde in Rossini's Mosè in Egitto in 1968. She performed at the Vienna State Opera as Amelia and Santuzza in 1967, and at La Scala in Milan as Santuzza in 1970. She performed at the opera houses of Bologna, Palermo, Florence, Verona, the Berlin State Opera, and the Teatro Colón in Buenos Aires, among others. Her repertoire included additional roles such as Abigaille in Verdi's Nabucco, Maddalena in Giordano's Andrea Chénier and Cherubini's Médée.

"Tom Schippers took me to Scala to understudy Callas in Medea. I figured it was good experience, and I needed the money, so I did all the rehearsals, and she came back and canceled my performance. She paid off the whole orchestra, the chorus, even me! The whole house was dark, because she didn't want me to sing in her stead. We actually became friends, because I was this little nothing, and we spoke all the time. As a young singer, there was nothing to be done. I wanted to sing leading roles in leading houses, and I did."

In November 1979, Ross was forced to stop stage performances, following a diagnosis of Bell's palsy. She sang in concert performances during the 1980s. She underwent surgery with muscle and nerve transfer to stabilise her face, which eventually allowed for a return to live performance in 1996.

Ross died on March 6, 2020, of kidney failure.
