= Edward Purrington =

Edward Purrington (December 6, 1929 – April 14, 2012) was an American opera director and artistic administrator. He began his career at the Santa Fe Opera in 1959 working in various positions through 1971, including stage manager, stage director, instructor in the Apprentice Program, business manager, and director of development and public relations. He had the fortune of getting to work directly with many fine opera composers during his years with the SFO, such as Igor Stravinsky, Paul Hindemith, Gian Carlo Menotti, and Krzysztof Penderecki.

From 1972-1974 Purrington was chairman of the Performing Arts Department at the College of Santa Fe (now Santa Fe University of Art and Design). He left that position to become the General Director of the Tulsa Opera in 1975, a position he held through 1987. In 1987 he became the Artistic Administrator of the Washington National Opera. He stepped down from that position in 2001 but remained employed as an Artistic Consultant for the company until his death in April 2012. Purrington was also notably on the panel of judges of the Metropolitan Opera National Council Auditions. In 2002 he was honored by OPERA America for his "Distinguished Service to the Field of Opera."

== Sources ==
- Biography of Edward Purrington at the Metropolitan Opera Auditions
- Obituary of Edward Purrington in the Washington Post, April 23, 2012.
