= Mark Bucci =

American classical composer (1924–2002)

Mark Bucci (26 February 1924 – 22 August 2002) was an American composer, lyricist, and dramatist. Influenced by Giacomo Puccini, his work is composed in a contemporary yet lyrical style, which frequently employs marked rhythms and memorable harmonies and melodies.

== Early life and education ==
Mark Bucci was born on 26 February 1924 in New York City. His parents were of Sicilian and Scottish ancestry. He studied music composition with Tibor Serly in New York City from 1942 to 1945 and then at the Juilliard School with Frederick Jacobi and Vittorio Giannini. At Juilliard he was notably the first winner of the school's Irving Berlin scholarship award in 1948 which was made possible through a donation by Rodgers and Hammerstein. Bucci also studied composition under Aaron Copland at the Tanglewood Music Center during the summers. He was awarded Guggenheim Fellowships in 1953 and 1957.

== Career ==
Bucci's orchestral work Introduction and Allegro was programmed in five concerts given by the Cleveland Symphony Orchestra during the 1946-1947 season. He wrote the score to Holland Dills's play Cadenza which was given its premiere at the Hedgerow Theatre (HT) in 1947. This was followed by the score for Androcles and Lion which was staged at the HT the following year. Bucci's first opera, The Boor, was premiered at Finch College on December 29, 1949. It used a libretto by Eugene Haun based on Anton Chekhov's 1888 short story of the same name.

In 1950 Bucci arranged the music for a performance of The Beggar's Opera by the Interplayers at Carnegie Recital Hall. He composed the music to the short play Summer Afternoon which was staged by the American Lyric Theater at the Provincetown Playhouse in 1952. That same year he wrote the score to William Saroyan's Elmer and Lily which was staged at Alfred University. He composed the music for an adaptation of James Thurber's The 13 Clocks which was broadcast on th ABC television program The Motorola Television Hour in 1953. The production starred Roberta Peters as Saralinda, John Raitt as the Prince, and Basil Rathbone as the evil Duke. It was later staged at the Westport Country Playhouse in July 1954 in a double bill with Leonard Bernstein's Trouble in Tahiti. Gene Saks portrayed the Duke and Constance Brigham the Princess.

In June 1953 Bucci's operetta The Dress was given its premiere in a private performance at the home of Parker O. Griffith, president of the Griffith Piano Company of Newark with Edith Gordon and Earl Redding leading the cast. It was later given its official premiere on December 8, 1953 in a double bill with another new opera by Bucci, Sweet Betsy from Pike, at the 92nd Street Y. In August 1954 the American Mime Theatre performed The Western using a score composed by Bucci.

Commissions for musical revues and operas followed, including the opera Tale for a Deaf Ear which premiered at the Tanglewood Music Festival in August 1957 and was later mounted at the New York City Opera in 1958. His opera The Hero, commissioned by the Lincoln Center Fund and first broadcast from New York in 1965, won the Italia Prize in 1966. Bucci also wrote music for two Broadway musical revues, Vintage '60 (1960) and New Faces of 1962 (1962), and several film scores including Seven in Darkness (1969), My Friends Need Killing (1976) and Human Experiments (1979). He is also the author of a handful of plays.

== Personal life and death ==
He had one son, Jonathan Phillips Bucci, with his wife theatre publicist and playwright Peggy Phillips Bucci.

Bucci died in Camp Verde, Arizona on 22 August 2002.
