= Giulio Gari =

American tenor

Giulio Gari (September 9, 1909 – April 15, 1994) was a tenor who performed on both the opera and concert stages. He sang more than fifty-five lyric and dramatic roles. He performed with the New York City Opera from 1945 to 1952 and with the Metropolitan Opera from 1953 to 1961. He worked as a voice teacher at a variety of institutions after his retirement from performance.

== Early life ==
Gari was born Samu Gyula in 1909 in Mediasch, Nagy-Küküllő County, Austria-Hungary (now Mediaş, Romania), the youngest of a family of ten children. He gained recognition as a child singing in operetta throughout Romania and Hungary. He studied with the celebrated Viennese soprano Lotte Gelinek and later at the Verdi Conservatory in Milan.

== Career ==
In 1938, he made his operatic debut at Rome's Teatro Reale dell’Opera, when he substituted for Tito Schipa as Almaviva in Gioachino Rossini's Barbiere di Siviglia (The Barber of Seville) under the baton of Tullio Serafin.

Soon after, he secured a National Broadcasting Company contract singing weekly with the NBC Symphony Orchestra and performing on the NBC Radio show, "Musical Bits", with Phil Spitalny conducting.

In 1939, he sang at the St Louis Opera in Gian Carlo Menotti's Amelia Goes to the Ball, beginning his long association with Maestro Laszlo Halasz, the founder of the New York City Opera.

He served in the American armed forces during World War II as an infantryman with the Eighth Motorized Division, which served in Germany.

In 1945, he made his official debut with a leading American opera company when he appeared at the New York City Opera for the first time as the Steersman in Richard Wagner's Der fliegende Holländer. Composer Virgil Thomson, then music critic of the New York Herald Tribune, wrote "the vocal treat of the evening was Giulio Gari, who sang with beauty of voice, easy command of the heroic style and no hesitancy about the high notes."

He wed Lela Mae Flynn in New York City on Oct. 29, 1946, and in the early 1950s he married Gloria Fishman.

Gari toured Latin America and the Caribbean garnering ecstatic reviews, particularly in 1946 when he sang in Beethoven's Ninth Symphony with the Havana Symphony Orchestra under Leopold Stokowski. In Central America he performed with Gladys Swarthout and in Guatemala participated in the first opera season there in twenty years.

On January 6, 1953, Gari made his debut with the Metropolitan Opera as Pinkerton in Madama Butterfly with Licia Albanese as Cio-Cio-San. New York Times critic Howard Taubman praised "his fine voice...fine style...skill and polish" and predicted a luminous future for the debutant.

== Reaction ==
Gari garnered superlative reviews throughout his career. Noel Strauss of The New York Times wrote of his Rodolfo in La Boheme that it provided "the most distinguished vocalism of the evening, he showed sensitivity and marked refinement of style, climactic and exciting." Similar critical adulation was expressed for his work in such roles as the Duke of Mantua in Rigoletto and Calaf in Turandot.

His versatility, preparedness, and stamina were legendary. When he performed both Turiddu in Cavalleria Rusticana and Canio in Pagliacci, rarely ever attempted, the New York Times lauded him for singing both parts "with their different tessitura and their severe demands on an artist's vocal and histrionic endurance", and for delivering each "with remarkable control of his fine voice and an unusual depth of human feeling. That same evening he went on to sing Don Jose in Carmen.

Gari could always be counted on to appear whenever occasion demanded and to deliver superb performances, even when he was singing a regular 32-week schedule. Once during the Metropolitan Opera's annual seven-week tour he was flown to Boston to sing his first Don Carlo in a performance hailed as "sterling." He also astounded everyone when he made last-minute appearances as the Duke in Rigoletto, Don Jose in Carmen, and Dimitry in Boris Godunov, on three successive nights.

Gari also appeared frequently as a guest artist. He sang Alfredo in excerpts from Verdi's La Traviata on the TV show Opera Cameos in 1955. He performed in Kodály's Psalmus Hungaricus at Carnegie Hall, and in the American premiere of Ildebrando Pizzetti's L’Assassinio nella Cattedrale at the Empire State Music Festival.

== Retirement ==
Gari retired from the Metropolitan in 1961. In 1964, he became director of the Voice Department of the Long Island Institute of Music. He also taught voice at Lehigh University. In 1970 he joined the faculty of the Curtis Institute of Music in Philadelphia. In 1974, he began teaching at Temple University. During this time, he also maintained his private voice studio in Manhattan and served as Cantor at Temple Sinai in Forest Hills, New York. On April 15, 1994, Gari died of pneumonia in the Mount Sinai Medical Center in Manhattan.

== Giulio Gari Foundation ==
The Giulio Gari Foundation was established in 2002 by his widow Gloria Gari, née Fishman, Licia Albanese and Stephen de Maio to continue the legacy of Giulio Gari. The foundation is a not for profit organisation registered in New York, intended to discover, support and encourage young classical singers.

=== Giulio Gari International Vocal Competition ===
The foundation hosts an annual vocal competition in New York City since 2003. It is open to professional opera singers from 21 to 35 years of age. Winners receive their prize at the foundation’s gala concert.

==== Notable winners ====
- Christopher Bolduc (2007)
- Marina Costa-Jackson (2013, 2014)
- Anthony Roth Costanzo (2008)
- Michael Fabiano (2006)
- Joyce El-Khoury (2009)
- Joshua Guerrero (2015)
- Wendy Bryn Harmer (2008)
- Megan Marie Hart (2011)
- Bryan Hymel (2008)
- Alasdair Kent (2015)
- Szymon Komasa (2015)
- Steven LaBrie (2012, 2013)
- Theo Lebow (2015)
- Yonghoon Lee (2005)
- Isabel Leonard (2005)
- Audrey Luna (2007, 2009)
- Kirsten MacKinnon (2016)
- Christopher Magiera (2014, 2016)
- Angela Meade (2007)
- Ewa Plonka (2014)
- Brenda Rae (2008)
- Kevin Ray (2013)
- Gaston Rivero (2003, 2006)
- Matthew Vickers (2019)
