= Bryan Hymel =

American operatic tenor (born 1979)

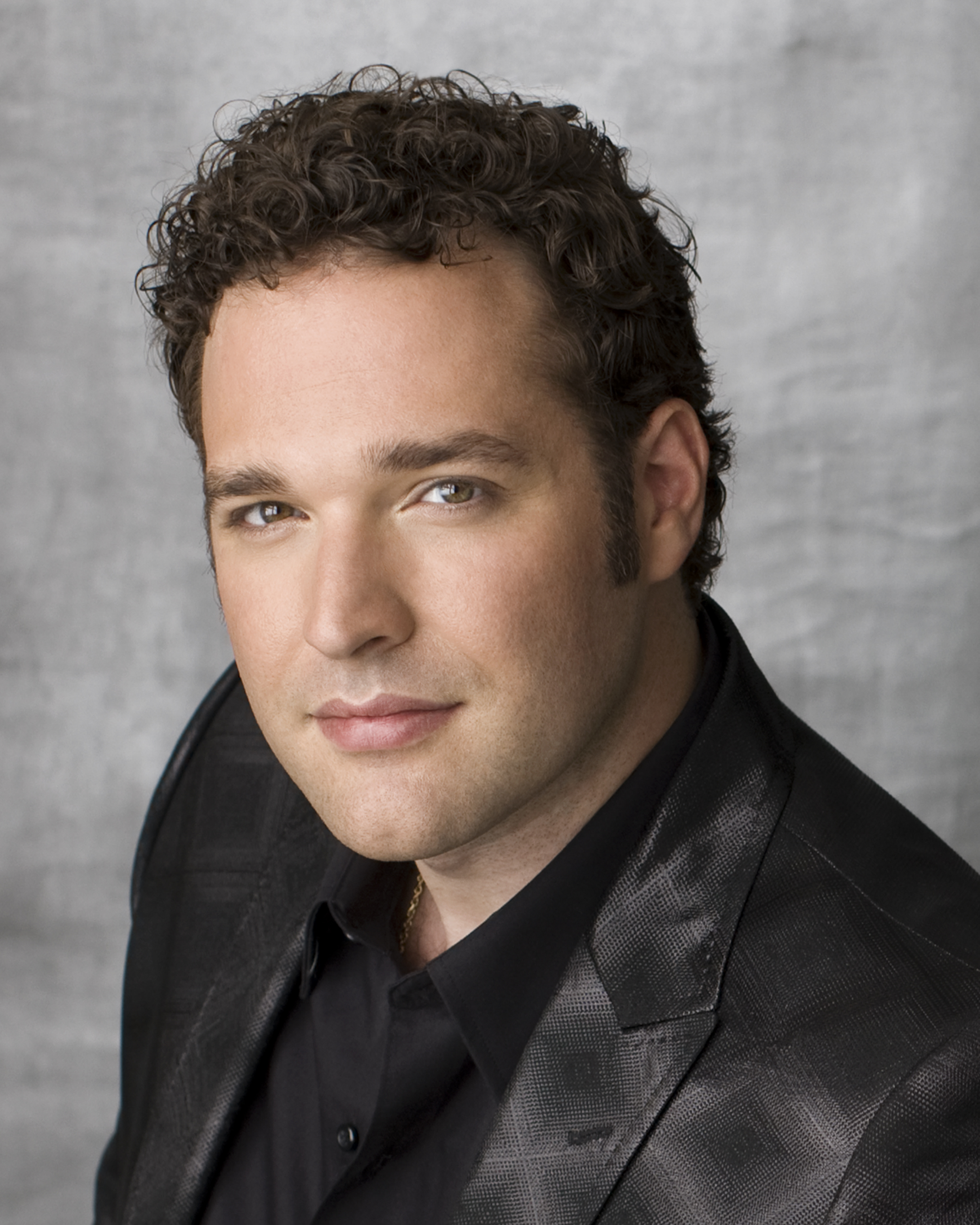
- Born: August 8, 1979 (age 47); New Orleans, Louisiana
- Occupation: Opera singer (tenor)

Bryan Hymel (born August 8, 1979) is an American operatic tenor who was born and raised in New Orleans, Louisiana and graduated from Jesuit High School and Loyola University New Orleans.

== Early years ==
Bryan Hymel came to the attention of opera houses at the age of 19, when he was a winner in the Verdi Aria Competition at the Aspen Music Festival in Aspen, Colorado. A year later he was a grand finalist in the Metropolitan Opera National Council Auditions—where he was the youngest participant—and he received an encouragement grant from the George London Foundation for Singers. After graduating from Loyola University New Orleans with a bachelor's degree in Vocal Performance, he participated in the Merola Opera Program at the San Francisco Opera. Following his time there he attended the prestigious Academy of Vocal Arts in Philadelphia, where he was further able to hone his craft.

== Career ==
=== Early career ===
Hymel made his professional debut in 1998 as the Philistine messenger in Samson et Dalila with the New Orleans Opera, a company where he has performed many roles, including Arturo in Lucia di Lammermoor, Luigi in Il tabarro, and Rinuccio in Gianni Schicchi. After his hometown debut, Hymel sang Tamino in Die Zauberflöte and the Duke in Rigoletto with Opera Grand Rapids. He made his European debut in 2007 at the Wexford Festival Opera, performing the role of the Prince in Dvorak's Rusalka. Later that year he made his New York recital debut with Michelle DeYoung under the sponsorship of the George London Foundation. He has also sung at Carnegie Hall with Opera Orchestra of New York in a gala concert honoring the 100th performance there of Eve Queler that also featured Renée Fleming, Marcello Giordani, and Dolora Zajick.

=== 2011 to 2014 ===
In recent years Hymel has been seen in many leading opera houses in Europe as well as North and South America, performing Don José in Carmen at the Royal Opera House, Covent Garden (3D Blue-Ray Opus Arte 3D7096), the Canadian Opera Company, with the Simon Bolivar Orchestra in Caracas, Venezuela, conducted by Sir Simon Rattle, and at La Scala Milan. He has also sung the role of Pinkerton in Madama Butterfly with English National Opera and the Canadian Opera Company, Cavaradossi in Tosca with Opéra National de Bordeaux, Guido in A Florentine Tragedy and Arturo in I Puritani with Greek National Opera, Énée in Les Troyens with the Netherlands Opera, and the Prince in Rusalka with the Boston Lyric Opera. In the summer of 2011, Hymel sang the title role in Faust at The Santa Fe Opera.

In July 2012, Hymel performed the role of Énée in the Covent Garden Troyens, replacing Jonas Kaufmann who was suffering from an infection., and replaced Marcello Giordani in the same role for his Metropolitan Opera debut on December 26, 2012, as well as all subsequent performances in the 2012/2013 season, including a worldwide HD telecast.

=== 2015 to present ===
In 2015, Hymel released his first solo album entitled "Heroique." He also performed in La bohème at the Dallas Opera and concluded the year with his debut performance at the Paris Opera with Berlioz's La Damnation de Faust.

In 2016, Hymel performed in the Rosenblat Recitals alongside Irene Roberts at Wigmore Hall. Additional performances include Pinkerton at the 2016 Chorégies d’Orange and appeared in Roméo et Juliette at the Metropolitan Opera.

In 2017, Hymel replaced tenor Fabiano Sartori in the role of Canio in “Pagliacci” at the Royal Opera House. Additional performances in 2017 include singing the title role in Don Carlos at the Royal Opera House in London, and a recital at Loyola University New Orleans.

In 2018, Hymel was scheduled to perform in Les Vêpres Siciliennes at the Bavarian State Opera but withdrew partway through the season due to a coughing fit during the first performance. He cancelled his scheduled appearances in the leading role of Raoul in Meyerbeer's Les Huguenots at the Paris Opera less than two weeks before opening, also in 2018. Hymel cancelled his performances in the Paris Opera's Les Troyens in January 2019. He performed in Barrie Kosky's production of Bizet's Carmen at the Royal Opera later in the year. Additional performances include Puccini's Madama Butterfly at the Teatro alla Scala and a recital in hometown at Tulane University. Hymel was scheduled to sing the role of Roméo in Roméo et Juliette at San Francisco Opera in September 2019 but cancelled all his performances at short notice.

In 2022, Hymel was named an Artist in Residence and adjunct instructor at Westminster Choir College, the school of music of Rider University.

In 2025, Hymel was appointed as an Associate Professor of Music in Voice at the Indiana University Jacobs School of Music.

== Awards ==
In 2002 Hymel was one of the winners of the Opera Lirica d’Orvieto Aria Competition in Perugia, Italy as well as the Palm Beach Opera Competition. He was the winner of the George London Award in 2007. In 2008 he had a great run of success in competitions, being named the First-Prize winner of the Giulio Gari Foundation Competition, the Loren L. Zachary Vocal Competition, and the Licia Albanese/Puccini Foundation Competition, and in 2009 he was named Top Prize Winner of the Gerda Lissner Foundation Competition. In 2012 he won the Beverly Sills Award.

== Personal life ==
Hymel married Greek soprano Irini Kyriakidou and has performed alongside her in numerous operatic performances. In 2015, the couple had a baby girl.
