= Donovan Singletary =

American opera bass baritone

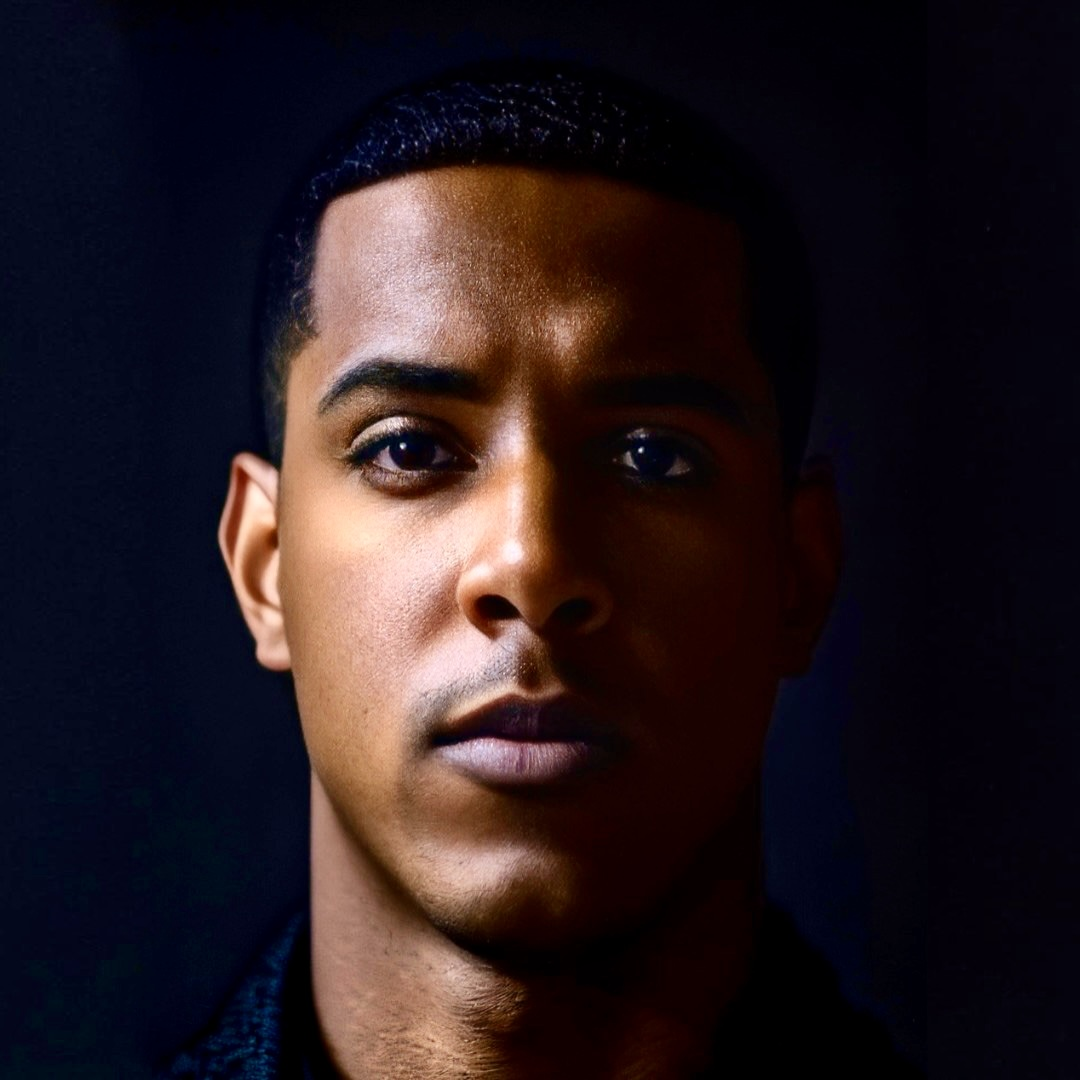
Donovan Singletary

Donovan Singletary is an American bass-baritone who has performed with the Metropolitan Opera, Glyndebourne, La Scala, and Seattle Opera. He trained in the Metropolitan Opera's Lindemann Young Artist Development Program + Juilliard, a joint venture developed under James Levine. His work has been recognized in The New York Times and Seattle Gay News, with critics noting his stage presence and vocal quality.

== Early life and education ==
Singletary was raised in Crestview, Florida, in the state's northern panhandle near the Alabama border. He discovered singing as a young teenager and pursued formal musical training. He earned his undergraduate degree from Stetson University, studying under Craig Maddox and Duncan Couch.

In 2023, the Okaloosa County Commission proclaimed October 23 as "Donovan Singletary Day" in recognition of his artistic achievements and connection to his hometown.

He later attended the Mannes School of Music for graduate-level vocal study before joining The Met Young Artist Program and the Juilliard School.

== Career ==
Singletary made his Metropolitan Opera debut in Salome during the 2008–2009 season. He later appeared with the company as Angelotti in Tosca, with The New York Times citing his contribution to the cast. At the Metropolitan Opera, his performance as Jake in Porgy and Bess in 2020 was noted by The New York Times, which wrote that "the robust bass-baritone Donovan Singletary…was a standout." The following year, he sang two minor roles in the New York City premiere of Terence Blanchard's 2021 opera Fire Shut Up in My Bones by the Met.

He has performed with the English National Opera, Seattle Opera, Glyndebourne, and La Scala, as well as in concert appearances at the Royal Albert Hall.

At English National Opera, Singletary appeared as Harry Bailey in Jake Heggie's It's a Wonderful Life.

He sang the role of Harvey in Glyndebourne's 2022 staging of Ethel Smyth's opera The Wreckers, earning positive notice for his contribution to the production.

His portrayal of Jake in Porgy and Bess at Seattle Opera received praise in the Seattle Gay News, who wrote that the "handsome bass-baritone Donovan Singletary wowed us with his easy acting and gorgeous voice as Jake."

At Seattle Opera, his performance as Monterone in Rigoletto received critical attention for its dramatic intensity; The Seattle Times described his entrance as "excellent" and highlighted the way it shifted the atmosphere of the scene.

== Awards and recognition ==
- Grand Prize Winner, Metropolitan Opera National Council Auditions
- 2021 Grammy Award for Best Opera Recording, in Metropolitan Opera's production of Porgy and Bess
- Major Grand Prize Winner, Sullivan Foundation
- Vienna Prize and Grand Prize Winner, George London Foundation..
- First Prize, Gerda Lissner International Vocal Competition
- First Prize, Giulio Gari International Vocal Competition
- First Prize, Licia Albanese–Puccini Foundation Competition

== Teaching and mentorship ==
Singletary has presented master classes, workshops, and coaching sessions at several colleges and universities, including Duke University and Florida International University, where he has worked with emerging singers on vocal technique, interpretation, and professional development.
