= The Licia Albanese-Puccini Foundation =

Musical organization

The Licia Albanese-Puccini Foundation is a musical organisation founded in 1974 whose scope is to provide assistance to young American and international artists by means of scholarships, study grants, and master classes.

The foundation is named after composer Giacomo Puccini and was created by Italian soprano Licia Albanese together with her husband Joseph Gimma. The foundation assisted hundreds of young artists, singers, instrumentalists, conductors, and composers who have appeared in opera houses throughout the United States and the world, including the Metropolitan Opera and New York City Opera. Albanese served as chairwoman, and donated the proceeds from master classes she held well into her 90s to the foundation.

== Licia Albanese-Puccini Foundation International Vocal Competition ==
The foundation hosts an international vocal competition open to singers from age 21 to 35. The singers compete in seven categories. Winners receive monetary prizes ranging from $1,000 to $12,500 and perform at a gala event held in New York City.

=== Notable winners ===
- Burak Bilgili (2001)
- Christopher Bolduc (2007)
- Liam Bonner (2011)
- Kevin Burdette (2002)
- Elizabeth Caballero (2002)
- Alyson Cambridge (2003)
- Patrick Carfizzi (2001)
- Michael Chioldi (1996, 1997)
- Sasha Cooke (2006)
- Ginger Costa-Jackson (2008)
- Ellie Dehn (2003, 2004)
- Joyce El-Khoury (2008)
- Michael Fabiano (2006)
- Rachele Gilmore (2007, 2009)
- Othalie Graham (2004)
- Eglise Gutiérrez (2002)
- Wendy Bryn Harmer (2005, 2007)
- Esther Heideman (2000)
- Bryan Hymel (2008)
- Takesha Meshé Kizart (2006)
- Steven LaBrie (2010)
- Yonghoon Lee (2005)
- Isabel Leonard (2006)
- Kate Lindsey (2005)
- Lester Lynch (1994)
- Angela Meade (2006)
- Erin Morley (2006)
- Latonia Moore (2002)
- Jay Hunter Morris (1995)
- Brian Mulligan (2002)
- Daniel Okulitch (2004)
- Lisette Oropesa (2007)
- Eric Owens (1994)
- Ailyn Perez (2004)
- Matthew Polenzani (1997)
- Robert Pomakov (2002)
- Barbara Quintiliani (2005)
- Brenda Rae (2007)
- Jennifer Rivera (2001)
- Gaston Rivero (2005, 2006, 2008)
- Valerian Ruminski (1998)
- Nadine Sierra (2009)
- Noah Stewart (2006)
- Stacey Tappan (1999)
- Russell Thomas (2004)
- Mirjam Tola (2000)
- Talise Trevigne (2009)
- James Valenti (2002)
- Tichina Vaughn (1995)
- Chen-Ye Yuan (1997)
