= Susan Owen =

American operatic soprano

Susan Owen, also known by her married name Susan Owen-Leinert, (born September 6, 1958) is an American operatic soprano, voice teacher, and opera director. She had an active international performance career during the 1980s and 1990s. She currently is the head of the vocal arts division at the Rudi E. Scheidt School of Music at the University of Memphis and serves as General Manager of The Chamber Opera of Memphis.

== Early life and education ==
Born in Salisbury, North Carolina, she earned a Bachelor of Music degree from East Carolina University in 1980 and a Master of Music degree from the University of Texas at Austin in 1983. In 1990 she won the Metropolitan Opera National Council Auditions. From 1995 to 1999 she was a member of the Staatstheater Kassel, Intendant Michael Leinert. From 1999 to 2002 she was a member of the Staatstheater Darmstadt with Mark Albrecht.

== Opera artist ==
As a guest artist Owen has sung leading roles with opera companies throughout the world; including the Aalto Theatre, the Austin Lyric Opera, the Berlin State Opera, the Deutsche Oper am Rhein, the Deutsche Oper Berlin and Staatsoper Berlin the Hawaii Opera Theatre, the Lyric Opera of Kansas City, the Opéra Royal de Wallonie, the Palm Beach Opera, the Semperoper, the Staatsoper Hannover, the Staatstheater Darmstadt, the Teatro Comunale di Bologna, the Teatro Lirico Giuseppe Verdi, Theater Aachen, Theater Bonn, and the Virginia Opera among others. Some of the roles she has performed on stage are Brünnhilde in The Ring Cycle, The Dyer's Wife in Die Frau ohne Schatten, both Elisabeth and Venus in Tannhäuser, Emilia Marty in The Makropulos Case, Georgette in Il Tabarro, Irene in Rienzi, Isolde in Tristan und Isolde, Leonora in La Forza del Destino, Maddalena in Andrea Chenier, Marie in Wozzeck, Ortrud in Lohengrin, Santuzza in Cavalleria Rusticana, Senta in The Flying Dutchman, The Woman in Erwartung, and the title roles in Aida, Elektra, Jenůfa, and Tosca.

== In Germany ==
She made her European debut with an invitation from Maestro Daniel Barenboim to the Staatsoper Berlin, where she sang Senta (Der Fliegende Holländer) and Helmwige (Die Walküre). Ms. Owen has sung major roles in guest engagements at the Deutsche Oper Berlin (Isolde, Tristan und Isolde; Christian Thielemann conducting), Semper Oper Dresden (Barak's Frau, Die Frau ohne Schatten), Deutsche Oper am Rhein (Isolde and Senta) and Opéra de Nancy et de Lorraine, France (Isolde). Her interpretation of the title role of Elektra by Richard Strauss was hailed in the press as the "Singer-Discovery of the year 2000", a role she performed at Staatstheater Darmstadt, Aalto Theater Essen, Antikenfestspiele in Trier, Theater Münster and Staatsoper Hannover. At Staatstheater Darmstadt she was a full-time ensemble member from 1999 – 2002 where she performed the roles of Isolde, Barak's Frau, Emily Marty The Makropoulos Case and Ortrud Lohengrin. Ms. Owen sang Brünnhilde Der Ring des Nibelungen with great critical acclaim at Staatstheater Kassel. Complete live recordings of Die Walküre, Siegfried and Götterdämmerung were successfully released on CD by Ars Production, Germany.

== International career ==
As Brünnhilde she was a guest in numerous opera houses including Oper Bonn, l'Opéra Royal de Wallonie, Teatro Giuseppe Verdi in Trieste and Theatre Kiel, as well as concert performances in Taipei and Tokyo. As a full-time ensemble member of Staatstheater Kassel (1995-1999) Ms. Owen performed Senta, Marie Wozzeck, Santuzza Cavalleria Rusticana, Leonora La Forza del Destino, Giorgetta Il Tabarro and the title role of Jenufa. Her career includes many engagements in the USA, for instance with the Palm Beach Opera she performed both Elisabeth and Venus in Wagner’s Tannhäuser conducted by Anton Guadagno. With the Austin Lyric Opera she performed the roles of Aida, Tosca and Elisabeth ( Tannhäuser ) and with the Opera Orchestra of New York she sang Irene (Rienzi) conducted by Eve Queler. Other major Italian roles include Amelia Un Ballo in Maschera, Maddalena Andrea Chénier, Leonora Il Trovatore and Lady Macbeth. Highlights of her performances on the concert stage include Gustav Mahler's 8th Symphony (Soprano 1) at the Beethoven Festival in Bonn and Cologne, La Terre for soprano, piano and orchestra by Zygmunt Krauze for Radio France in Paris, Arnold Schoenberg’s Gurrelieder in Darmstadt and Bratislava, Richard Wagner’s Wesendonck Lieder as well as the Vier letzte Lieder by Richard Strauss.

== Teaching and editing ==
Associate Professor of Voice and Head of the Vocal Arts Division at the University of Memphis / Rudi E. Scheidt School of Music Susan Owen-Leinert founded the Memphis Opera & Song Academy, a summer academy for opera singers on the verge of international careers. She was the General Manager of The Chamber Opera of Memphis which since 2007 has successfully produced contemporary opera productions such as The Medium by Sir Peter Maxwell Davies which was invited to Germany for guest performances. In 2009 Susan Owen-Leinert was the recipient of the CCFA Dean’s Creative Achievement Award. She has been a guest lecturer, recitalist and given master classes in the United States, Germany and Cyprus. As the President of The Spohr Society of the United States of America, Ms. Owen-Leinert is the editor of the first critical edition of the complete Lieder by Louis Spohr in 12 volumes with the German Publisher Dohr in Cologne.

== External links and references ==
- Worldcat Identities: Owen-Leinert, Susan
- Editor of the first complete and critical Edition of Louis Spohr's Lieder in 12 volumes at the publisher Dohr, Cologne, Germany
- The Rudi E. Scheidt School of Music
- Richard Wagner Der Ring des Nibelungen: Susan Owen as Brünnhilde. Complete Live Recording from ARS Produktion, Germany
