= Gail Robinson (soprano) =

American opera singer (1946–2008)

Gail Robinson (August 7, 1946 – October 19, 2008) was an American operatic soprano who sang with many of the world's leading opera companies during the 1970s and 1980s. She spent most of her career singing lyric coloratura roles at the Metropolitan Opera. After her performance career ended she taught singing to young artists and also directed the Metropolitan Opera's Young Artist Program for over ten years. Upon leaving the Met, she joined the voice faculty at the University of Kentucky.

== Biography ==
Robinson was born in Meridian, Mississippi, but moved to Jackson, Tennessee, shortly thereafter. She showed musical talent early, performing locally on radio and television. She graduated from Jackson High School in 1964 and went on to study voice under Norvell Taylor at Memphis State University. While at MSU, she won the Metropolitan Opera's Audition of the Air (the precursor to the National Council Auditions) at the age of 19. Following this important win, Robinson left MSU to the Met's development program for young artists, with which Robinson sang leading roles in school performances throughout New York, beginning in 1966.

Robinson made her professional opera debut in 1966 with Memphis Opera as the title heroine in Donizetti's Lucia di Lammermoor conducted by Fiora Contino. That same year she toured to Rhode Island with the Met to perform the role of the Swallow in the American premiere of Malcolm Williamson's The Happy Prince. She made her debut at the company's opera house three years later as the First Genii in Mozart's The Magic Flute. She became a regular performer at the Met during the next two decades singing in more than 200 performances with the company. Her roles with the Metropolitan Opera included Adina in L'Elisir d'Amore, Almirena in Rinaldo, Amore in Orfeo ed Euridice, Annina in La traviata, Barbarina in Le nozze di Figaro, Flower Maiden in Parsifal, Garsenda in Francesca da Rimini, Gilda in Rigoletto, Gretel in Hänsel und Gretel, Guadalena in La Périchole, Juliette in Roméo et Juliette, Konstanze in Die Entführung aus dem Serail, Lucia in Lucia di Lammermoor, Norina in Don Pasquale, Oscar in Un ballo in maschera, Pamina in The Magic Flute, Princess in L'enfant et les sortilèges, Rosina in Il Barbiere di Siviglia, Servilia in La clemenza di Tito, Sophie in Der Rosenkavalier, and Sophie in Werther among others. Her last performance both with the Met and on the operatic stage was as Echo in Ariadne auf Naxos on October 10, 1987. Robinson decided to retire at the time for health reasons.

She was featured in the April 2, 1971 issue of LIFE magazine in the story "Pops' Girl Gail Makes it at the Met" (pages 57–61).

Robinson's career also took her to other leading opera houses around the world including the Hamburg State Opera, Berlin State Opera, the Munich State Opera, and Grand Théâtre de Genève among others. She also sang at numerous companies in the United States including the Lyric Opera of Chicago, San Antonio Grand Opera Festival, Opera Company of Philadelphia, New Orleans Opera, Opera Omaha and the Kentucky Opera among others.

Robinson also had a fruitful career as a concert artist and recitalist, giving performances in more than 80 cities in the United States alone and singing at such distinguished places as the White House and Carnegie Hall. She performed with several prestigious orchestras including the Hollywood Bowl Orchestra and the Bavarian Radio Symphony Orchestra among others.

After her career on stage she began mentoring young singers in the Metropolitan Opera's Young Artist Program, becoming director of both that program and the Met's National Council Auditions for almost fifteen years. In 1999 she became a professor of voice at the University of Kentucky and held the position until she died. Several of her students have gone on to have successful opera careers including Stephanie Blythe, Dwayne Croft, Christine Goerke, Paul Groves and Heidi Grant Murphy.

Robinson was the recipient of numerous honours including an honorary PhD in fine arts from Rhodes College, Memphis, and the inaugural Obelisk Award of the Center for Contemporary Opera.

Robinson died of complications from rheumatoid arthritis on October 19, 2008, aged 62. She was the wife of Henno Lohmeyer, a journalist and writer. They had two children together, Patrick Lohmeyer and Jennifer Toney, and four grandchildren.

== Recordings ==
Very little of Robinson's work has been recorded. She was never offered a recording contract with a record label and the only surviving records of her work are a videotaped performance of the Met's production of Francesca da Rimini, several operetta films, such as Millöcker's Die Dubarry, that she made in Germany during the 1970s, and several television appearances.

== Opera roles ==
- Adele, Die Fledermaus (Johann Strauss II)
- Adina in L'elisir d'amore (Donizetti)
- Almirena, Rinaldo (Handel)
- Amina, La sonnambula (Bellini)
- Amore, Orfeo ed Euridice (Gluck)
- Annina, La traviata (Verdi)
- Barbarina, The Marriage of Figaro (Mozart)
- Echo Ariadne auf Naxos (Richard Strauss)
- Fiordiligi, Così fan tutte (Mozart)
- Flower maiden, Parsifal (Wagner)
- Garsenda, Francesca da Rimini (Zandonai)
- Gilda, Rigoletto (Verdi)
- Gretel, Hänsel und Gretel (Humperdinck)
- Guadalena, La Périchole (Offenbach)
- Juliet, Roméo et Juliette (Gounod)
- Konstanze, The Abduction from the Seraglio (Mozart)
- Leila, Les pêcheurs de perles (Bizet)
- Lucia, Lucia di Lammermoor (Donizetti)
- Lucy, The Telephone (Menotti)
- Margot, Die Dubarry (Millöcker)
- Marie, La fille du régiment (Donizetti)
- Norina, Don Pasquale (Donizetti)
- Oscar, Un ballo in maschera (Verdi)
- Pamina in Die Zauberflöte (Mozart)
- Princess, L'enfant et les sortilèges (Ravel)
- Romilda, Xerxes (Handel)
- Rosina in Il barbiere di Siviglia (Rossini)
- Servilia, La clemenza di Tito (Mozart)
- Sophie, Der Rosenkavalier (Richard Strauss)
- Sophie, Werther (Massenet)
- Zerlina, Don Giovanni (Mozart)
