= Amber Wagner =

American soprano

Amber Wagner (born June 1, 1980) an American soprano who has performed internationally to critical acclaim. She has often performed in the operas of composer Giuseppe Verdi and Richard Wagner.

== Early life and education ==
Born in Santa Barbara, California but raised in Hillsboro, Oregon, both her parents were musicians and were active in the musical community while she was growing up. She began her opera journey when she auditioned for an on-campus vocal ensemble at Grand Canyon University. Originally an intended sociology major, she auditioned for Dr. Sheila Corley in hopes of earning scholarship money and was quickly encouraged to switch her major to music.

== Career ==
In 2007, Wagner was accepted as one of six to the prestigious Metropolitan National Council Auditions and was consequently featured in the documentary The Audition.

=== 2014-2015 ===
Wagner debuted at the Lyric Opera of Chicago as Leonora in Verdi's Il Trovatore as well as Elizabeth in Richard Wagner's Tannhäuser. She also debuted with the Toronto Symphony Orchestra, L'Orchestre Philharmonique de Nice, and the Houston Symphony Orchestra. Wagner performed with the Orquesta Filarmónica de Jalisco in an all-Richard Wagner program, the Russian National Orchestra in Beethoven's Symphony No. 9 at the Napa Valley Festival del Sole, and as Senta in a performance with the Chicago Symphony Orchestra during the Ravinia Festival.

=== 2015-2016 ===
Wagner debuted at the Bayerische Staatsoper in the role of Ariadne auf Naxos, a role which she reprised later that season at the Minnesota Opera and Palm Beach Opera. She took the role of Senta and Sieglande in the Oper Frankfurt, Verdi's Requiem with the Los Angeles Master Chorale and Milwaukee Symphony Orchestra, as well as a selection of the music of Richard Wagner with the Minnesota Orchestra. Additionally, she performed a selection of Strauss Lieder and Mahler's Symphony No. 4 with the Orquesta Filarmónica de Jalisco. She also performed alongside mezzo-soprano Jamie Barton at the Tucson Desert Song Festival and Arizona Opera.

=== 2017-2018 ===
Wagner debuted in Australia in the role of Sieglande as well as taking the role of Senta in Richard Wagner's The Flying Dutchman at The Metropolitan Opera. She reprised the role of Sieglinde in Richard Wagner's Die Walküre at the 2017 Edinburgh Festival, and returned to the Lyric Opera of Chicago, taking the role of Turandot which she had previously performed with the Vancouver Opera. With Opera Australia, she debuted as Aida, reprised the role of Senta in Rome with the Accademia di Santa Cecilia as well as the National RAI Symphony Orchestra. She also performed Verdi's Requiem with the Oregon Symphony.

=== 2018-2019 ===
Wagner took the role of Giorgetta in Puccini's Il Tabarro at The Metropolitan Opera, Turandot with Opera Australia, and Sieglinde in a performance of Wagner's Die Walküre with Oper Frankfurt as well as at a Tanglewood performance which was met with critical acclaim.

=== 2020- ===
In the summer of 2022, Wagner took the role of Ruth in The Pirates of Penzance with the Cincinnati Opera as well as took the role of Brangäne in Richard Wagner's Tristan und Isolde in the fall of 2022 with the Seattle Opera. In the winter she performed with the Boston Symphony Orchestra featuring Act 3 of Tannhäuser. In March 2023 she performed as Alice in Falstaff with the Palm Beach Opera.

== Awards ==
- Finalist of the Metropolitan Opera National Council Auditions
- Winner of the Liederkranz Foundation Competition
- Winner of the Richard Tucker Career Grant Award
- Winner of the Kirsten Flagstad Award from the George London Foundation
- Recipient of Sullivan Foundation Career Grant
- First place winner of the Palm Beach Opera and Palm Springs Opera Competitions
- Winner of the Lynne Harvey Scholarship of the Musicians Club of Women
- Winner of the Union League Civics and Arts Foundation Competition
