= James McCray =

American opera singer (died 2018)

James McCray (died January 2018) was an American operatic tenor and voice teacher.

== Life and career ==
Born in Ohio, McCray served in the United States Marine Corps during the Korean War before entering the Mannes School of Music in New York City where he was a pupil of Patricia Neway. In 1962, he won the Metropolitan Opera National Council Auditions. In spring 1965, he was active with the Concert Opera Association at Philharmonic Hall in NYC, singing Chekalinsky in The Queen of Spades and Francesco in the United States premiere of Hector Berlioz's Benvenuto Cellini. The following summer he appeared at the Stratford Festival of Canada as Jimmy Mahoney in Kurt Weill's Rise and Fall of the City of Mahagonny.

From 1965 to 1968, McRay was active with the Israel National Opera; performing such roles as Canio in Pagliacci, Cavaradossi in Tosca, Don Jose in Carmen, Manrico in Il trovatore, Riccardo in Un ballo in maschera, and Samson in Samson et Dalila. In 1969, he made his debut at the New York City Opera as Vladimir Igorevich in Alexander Borodin's Prince Igor. The following year he sang the role of Count Loris Ipanov in Victorien Sardou's Fedora with the Opera Orchestra of New York, conductor Eve Queler, and soprano Judith de Paul in the title role. In 1971, he portrayed the role of Dick Johnson in La fanciulla del West at the Minnesota Opera. That same year he performed the role of Manrico with Irene Dalis and Betty Allen alternating in the role of Azucena for the San Francisco Opera. In 1972, he created the role of Ken in the world premiere of Harold Farberman's The Losers which was commissioned by the Juilliard School.

From 1974 to 1976, McCray performed annually with the Greater Miami Opera Association, portraying roles in productions of Robert Ward's The Crucible, Richard Wagner's The Flying Dutchman, and Giuseppe Verdi's Otello under conductor Emerson Buckley. In 1977 he had a particular triumph at the Seattle Opera as Siegfried in Wagner's The Ring Cycle.

After retiring from singing, McCray lived and taught in The Hague, Netherlands at the McCray International Studio for Vocal Arts. He died in January 2018.
