= Nikki Li Hartliep =

American opera singer

- Born: September 22, 1955 (age 70); Naha, Okinawa Island, Japan
- Education: San Francisco Conservatory of Music
- Genres: Opera, classical
- Occupations: Soprano, voice teacher
- Years active: 1982–present
- Label: Bis

Nikki Li Hartliep (born September 22, 1955) is a Japanese-born American soprano who has performed with major opera companies and orchestras around the world.

== Life and career ==
Hartliep was born in Naha, Okinawa Island, and grew up in Alaska. She received her undergraduate degree in 1981 from the San Francisco Conservatory of Music. During her master's degree studies she took her first audition and was awarded a contract with San Francisco Opera's touring company, Western Opera Theater (1982).

In the United States, Hartliep performed leading roles with San Francisco Opera, Lyric Opera of Chicago, New York City Opera, Opera Company of Philadelphia, Seattle Opera, Minnesota Opera, Florida Grand Opera, Opera Colorado, Atlanta Opera, Austin Opera, The Florentine Opera, Nevada Opera and numerous other regional opera companies.

Outside the U.S., her international operatic performances have included leading roles with Canadian Opera, Teatro Teresa Carreno (Caracas, Venezuela), Dublin Grand Opera, and the Seiji Ozawa Saito Kinen Festival Matsumoto (Japan).

Hartliep debuted at Carnegie Hall in 1990 as the soprano soloist (Widow) in Mendelssohn's Elijah with Sherrill Milnes, the Collegiate Chorale and the Orchestra of St. Luke's. Later that year she appeared at Carnegie Hall in an historic performance of Jenůfa with Eve Queler and Opera Orchestra of New York (which was recorded live on the Bis label). Other orchestral appearances have included the Metropolitan Opera Orchestra, San Francisco Symphony, Teatre Liceu de Barcelona Orchestre, Minnesota Orchestra, Tucson Symphony Orchestra, Sacramento Symphony Orchestra, New Hampshire Symphony, Napa Valley Symphony, Charleston Symphony Orchestra, and other national regional orchestras.

Conductors who Hartliep has worked with include Kurt Herbert Adler, Maurizo Arena, Bruno Bartoletti, Richard Bonynge, Carlo Cillario, John Fiore, Henry Lewis, Sir Charles Mackerras, George Manahan, Eduard Muller, Seiji Ozawa, Imre Pallo, Sir John Pritchard, Nelson Riddle, Julius Rudel, Rodolfo Saglimbeni, Patrick Summers, and Edo de Waart.

Selected as an affiliate artist, Hartliep was in residence in communities throughout the U.S., with an opera outreach from 1984 until 1987. She was also named as a guest artist for the series "Meet the Artist at Lincoln Center" from 1995 until 1998.

Hartliep has taught in a variety of distinguished educational institutions to students at all levels: undergraduate, post-graduate, doctoral, and professional apprenticeship singers, in private voice lessons, studio classes, and masterclasses. On the faculty at Eastman School of Music, Rochester, New York, (2003–2014), as assistant professor of voice, part-time, Hartliep began concurrently teaching while on the performance faculty at the San Francisco Conservatory of Music (2003–2005). She was also on faculty with the college division of New World School of the Arts, Miami, Florida (1998–1999), and was appointed vocal advisor to Florida Grand Opera apprenticeship program (2000–2001).

Hartliep has maintained a private voice studio since 1999, most recently located at the National Opera Center in Manhattan, New York, with semi-professional and professional singers appearing with opera companies both nationally and internationally. Singers from the studio have been selected as young artists in such prestigious residency programs as the Lindemann Young Artist Development Program (Metropolitan Opera), Seattle Opera Young Artist Program, The Benenson Young Artist Program (Palm Beach Opera), and also have been invited as participants in summer young artist programs: Glimmerglass Festival Young Artists Program, Merola Opera Program (San Francisco Opera), Opera Theater of Saint Louis Gerdine Young Artist Program, Santa Fe Opera Apprentice Program for Young Artists, Aspen Music Festival and School, to name a few. In addition, studio singers are winners in the Metropolitan Opera National Council Auditions, the George London Foundation Competition, the Opera Index Vocal Competition, the Lotte Lenya Competition (Kurt Weill Foundation), Career Bridges, and others.

== Roles ==
Leading roles

- Cio-cio-san, Madama Butterfly, Giacomo Puccini
- Mimi, La bohème, Giacomo Puccini
- Suor Angelica, Suor Angelica, Giacomo Puccini
- Tatyana, Eugene Onegin, Pyotr Ilyich Tchaikovsky
- Alice Ford, Falstaff, Giuseppe Verdi
- Amelia, Un ballo in maschera, Giuseppe Verdi
- Ellen Orford, Peter Grimes, Benjamin Britten
- Rodelina, Rodelinda, George Frideric Handel
- Roselinda, Die Fledermaus, Johann Strauss II
- Countess, Le nozze di Figaro, Wolfgang Amadeus Mozart
- Antonia, Les contes d'Hoffmann, Jacques Offenbach
- Micaela, Carmen, Georges Bizet

Note: While an Adler Fellow, Hartliep was the official cover for a number of singers, including Mirella Freni (La bohème), Pilar Lorengar (Don Carlos), and Margaret Price (Otello).

== Awards ==
- Guest Artist, Montblanc de la Culture Arts Patronage (Honoring William Christie, Glyndebourne Opera), National Portrait Gallery Private Recital, London, 1997
- Grand Finalist Winner, Metropolitan Opera National Council Auditions, 1987
- Named by Musical America "Young Artists of 1987", Talent to Watch
- Winner, Opera Index Award 1987
- Grant Award $25,000, The Olga Forrai Foundation, 1987
- Named by Opera News, "Sixteen Young Singers on the Rise – Keep your Eye on...", July 1987
- Adler Fellowship, San Francisco Opera, 1983–1986
- The Schwabacher Award, 1st Prize, Merola Opera Program, San Francisco Opera, 1983
- Winner of the Fred Pavlow Award, San Francisco Opera Center Auditions 1982

== Recordings ==
- Jenůfa, Gramophone Bis 1990, Carnegie Hall, Opera Orchestra of New York
