= Gaston Rivero =

Uruguayan-US American operatic tenor

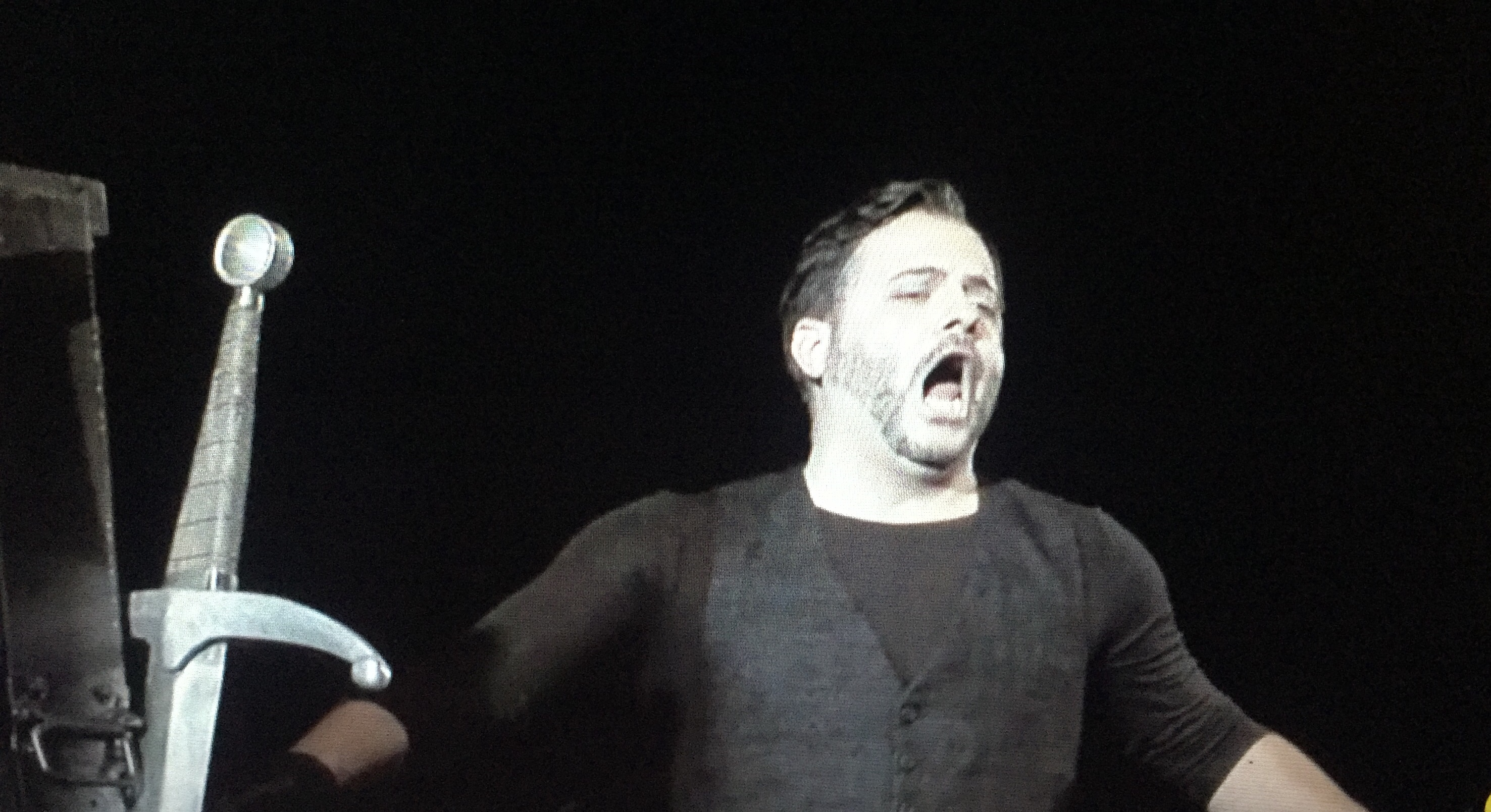
- Gaston Rivero in Verdi's Il trovatore
- Born: February 6, 1978 (age 48); Montevideo, Uruguay
- Education: Conservatorio Nacional Superior de Música; Music Conservatory of Westchester; Renata Scotto Opera Academy
- Occupation: Opera singer (tenor)
- Years active: 1997–present
- Website: www.gastonrivero.com

Gaston Rivero (born February 6, 1978) is an Uruguayan-US American operatic tenor from Argentina.

== Life and education ==
Rivero was born in Montevideo, and raised in Buenos Aires. His grandfather Ramón Olivera was a violinist at the Sodre Theater in Montevideo, Uruguay, and his father Carlos Rivero was a tenor at Teatro Colón in Buenos Aires. Rivero was interested in soccer as a teenager, and showed talent in singing at the age of 14. At age 19 he appeared in a concert with music by Jacques Offenbach at the Auditorio Del Pilar in Buenos Aires.

He worked as an assistant in a law firm and studied in the evenings at the National Conservatory of Music Carlos Lopez Buchardo. After applying for a position in the Teatro Colón choir three times without success, he moved to New York City with a scholarship in 2001. He participated in numerous competitions (see Awards), winning stipends and monetary prizes that enabled him to continue his education in New York, where conductor Eugene Kohn became his teacher and mentor. He studied at the music conservatory of Westchester and the Renata Scotto Opera Academy in New York.

== Career ==
Rivero made his concert debut at Carnegie Hall in December 2002, and joined the cast of Baz Luhrmann's production of La bohème on Broadway as understudy for the role of Rodolfo in the same year, resulting in his Broadway theatre debut in 2003. Rivero's opera debut followed in 2004 in Ponchielli's La Gioconda with the Opera Orchestra of New York (OONY) under Eve Queler. He made his European debut in 2005, performing the role of Pinkerton in Puccini's Madama Butterfly at the Staatstheater Nürnberg. Rivero sang the roles of Doge and Gondolier in Rossini's Otello at Carnegie Hall with the OONY conducted by Queler in 2007, alongside Bruce Ford as Otello, and Kenneth Tarver as Roderigo.

In 2013, Rivero stepped in to appear as Manrico in Verdi's Il trovatore alongside Plácido Domingo, Anna Netrebko, and Marina Prudenskaya, conducted by Daniel Barenboim at the Berlin State Opera, released on video by Deutsche Grammophon in 2014. Rivero made his debut in the title role of Verdi's Otello in 2019 at the Aalto Musiktheater Essen, with Tijl Faveyts in the role of Lodovico. In 2020 Rivero appeared in an abridged version of Il trovatore at the Leipzig Opera, which was performed without a live audience and live streamed because of the COVID-19 pandemic. From 2021 till 2024 Rivero was a lecturer in the summer program Lotte Lehmann Akademie in Perleberg, Germany. In 2024, Rivero made his debut at the Staatstheater Darmstadt in the title role of Otello, alongside Megan Marie Hart, who made her role debut as Desdemona, and Aris Argiris who made his European debut as Iago. Darmstadt's Generalmusikdirektor (GMD) Daniel Cohen conducted, the director was Paul-Georg Dittrich. While reviewers praised the singers and orchestra, they reacted negatively to Dittrich's staging.

=== Performance ===
Rivero performed at many opera houses and with companies internationally:

- In France he sang at Opéra de Monte-Carlo, Opéra National de Bordeaux, Opéra national du Rhin, Paris Opera, and Toulon Opera.
- In Germany he sang at Aalto Theatre, Berlin State Opera, Cologne Opera, Deutsche Oper Berlin, Leipzig Opera, Mannheim National Theatre, Staatstheater am Gärtnerplatz, Staatstheater Darmstadt, Staatstheater Mainz, Staatstheater Nürnberg, and Staatstheater Stuttgart.
- In Austria he appeared at the Graz Opera, and the Stadttheater Klagenfurt.
- In Italy he sang at Arena di Verona, Teatro Coccia, Teatro Filarmonico, Teatro Lirico Giuseppe Verdi, Teatro Mario Del Monaco, Teatro Massimo, Teatro Massimo Bellini, Teatro Pergolesi, Teatro Petruzzelli, Teatro Regio Torino, and Teatro Verdi di Padova.
- In the United States he performed with El Paso Opera, Knoxville Opera, Lyric Opera of San Antonio, Opera Orchestra of New York and Wichita Grand Opera.
- He also sang at the Hungarian State Opera in Budapest, Israeli Opera, Lithuanian National Opera, New National Theatre Tokyo in Japan, Royal Opera House Muscat in Oman, Savonlinna Opera Festival in Finland, Solís Theatre in Uruguay, Teatr Wielki in Warsaw, Poland, Zurich Opera in Switzerland.

== Recordings ==
=== Video ===
- Vittorio Gnecchi: Cassandra on Cassandra/Elektra (Germany 2010; staging Kirsten Harms, video director: Andreas Bolle) With Gaston Rivero as Agamemnone, recorded at Deutsche Oper Berlin.
- Pietro Mascagni: Cavalleria rusticana on Cavalleria rusticana/I pagliacci (Uruguay 2011; staging Willy Landin) With Chiara Angella, Gaston Rivero, Raquel Pierotti, Dario Sanguinetti, Kaycobé Gómez. Conductor: Carlos Vieu.
- Giuseppe Verdi: Il trovatore (Germany, 2013; staging Philipp Stölzl, video director Tiziano Mancini) With Anna Netrebko as Leonora, Marina Prudenskaya as Azucena, Gaston Rivero as Manrico, Plácido Domingo as Conte di Luna, Staatskapelle Berlin conducted by Daniel Barenboim. Deutsche Grammophon, Unitel Classica. OCLC 893622544

=== Audio ===
- Various: Gaston Rivero Tenor. One Soul Records 2003 (self-published)

== Awards ==
- 2000: Competition of the Asociación de Periodistas de la Televisión y Radiofonía Argentina (APTRA) – Best tenor
- 2002: Classical Productions Competition Carnegie Hall – 1st prize
- 2003:
  - Ibla Bellini Competition – Most promising young tenor
  - Opera Index Vocal Competition, NYC 2003 – Winner
- 2004:
  - New Jersey Alliance for the performing Arts
  - Palm Beach Opera Vocal Competition, Palm Beach Florida – 7th place
  - Altamura/Caruso International Voice Competition NYC – 2nd place
  - Joyce Dutka Arts Foundation – 1st place
- 2005:
  - BBC Cardiff Singer of the World competition – Finalist
  - The Licia Albanese-Puccini Foundation – Grant Winner
- 2006:
  - The Licia Albanese-Puccini Foundation – Grant Winner
  - Operalia – Finalist
  - Fritz and Lavinia Jensen Foundation Competition – 1st prize
  - Giulio Gari International Vocal Competition – 1st prize
  - Metropolitan Opera National Audition Eastern Region 2006 & 2007 – 1st place
- 2007:
  - Concurso Internacional de Canto Montserrat Caballé – 3rd Place
  - Vidda Recital Award of the Opera Orchestra of New York
- 2008:
  - George London Foundation Competition, NYC – Encouragement Award
  - Concurs Internacional de Cant Francesc Viñas – Finalist
  - The American Berlin Opera Foundation – Dixy Drechsler scholarship
- 2009: International Hans Gabor Belvedere Singing Competition – 2nd price opera
