= Tichina =

Tichina is a given name. Notable people with the name include:

- Tichina Arnold (born 1969), American actress, comedian, and singer
- Tichina Vaughn (born 1965), American operatic mezzo-soprano
- Tichina, a character in the animated short film "In the Stars", from the second volume of the anthology Star Wars: Visions

== See also ==
- Tychyna, a Ukrainian surname occasionally romanized as Tichina
