= Christopher Bolduc =

American operatic baritone

- Born: March 12, 1980; Albany, New York, U.S.
- Occupation: Operatic baritone
- Website: christopherbolduc.com

Christopher Bolduc (born March 12, 1980) is an American operatic baritone. A national semi-finalist in the 2007 and 2008 Metropolitan Opera National Council Auditions, first prize winner in the 2009 Sullivan Foundation competition and 2011 recipient of a $50,000 grant from the Annenberg Foundation, Bolduc made his Metropolitan Opera debut in 2013 in Nico Muhly's opera Two Boys and currently sings leading roles in the opera houses of Europe and North America.

== Early life and education ==
Bolduc was born in Albany, New York, and graduated from the State University of New York at Purchase with a bachelor of music and from the Indiana University School of Music with both a master of music and honorary Performer's Certificate. He then attended the Academy of Vocal Arts in Philadelphia, where he met his current voice teacher, Bill Schuman. He apprenticed first with Santa Fe Opera before making professional debuts at Central City Opera, Palm Beach Opera, and Fort Worth Opera. In 2010, Bolduc joined Theater Basel's Oper Avenir program, which led to many opportunities in European opera houses.

== Repertoire ==
=== Opera ===
Role	Opera	Composer
Demetrius	A Midsummer Night's Dream	Benjamin Britten
Sid	Albert Herring	Benjamin Britten
Billy Budd	Billy Budd	Benjamin Britten
Malatesta	Don Pasquale	Gaetano Donizetti
Belcore	L'elisir d'amore	Gaetano Donizetti
Valentin	Faust	Charles Gounod
Mercutio	Roméo et Juliette	Charles Gounod
Marcello, Schaunard	La bohème	Giacomo Puccini
Sharpless	Madama Butterfly	Giacomo Puccini
Lescaut	Manon Lescaut	Giacomo Puccini
Lescaut	Manon	Jules Massenet
Albert	Werther	Jules Massenet
Papageno	Die Zauberflöte	Wolfgang Amadeus Mozart
Don Giovanni	Don Giovanni	Wolfgang Amadeus Mozart
Guglielmo	Così fan tutte	Wolfgang Amadeus Mozart
Il Conte di Almaviva	Le nozze di Figaro	Wolfgang Amadeus Mozart
Jake (avatar)	Two Boys	Nico Muhly
Ramiro	L'heure espagnole	Maurice Ravel
Figaro	Il barbiere di Siviglia	Gioachino Rossini
Onegin	Eugene Onegin	Pyotr Ilyich Tchaikovsky
Robert	Iolanta	Pyotr Ilyich Tchaikovsky
Yeletsky	Pique Dame	Pyotr Ilyich Tchaikovsky
Gunther	Götterdämmerung	Richard Wagner
Der Heerrufer des Königs	Lohengrin	Richard Wagner

=== Oratorio and sacred music ===
Role	Piece	Composer
Soloist	Ein deutsches Requiem	Johannes Brahms
Soloist	War Requiem	Benjamin Britten
Soloist	Elijah	Felix Mendelssohn
Soloist	Carmina Burana	Carl Orff

== Awards ==
- Grant Recipient, Annenberg Foundation, 2011
- First Place, Sullivan Foundation, 2009
- Second Place, El Concurso Internacional de Canto Julián Gayarre, 2008
- Second Place, Gerda Lissner Foundation, 2008
- First Place, Florida Grand Opera Competition, 2007
