= Hongni Wu =

Chinese mezzo-soprano opera singer (born 1994)

Hongni Wu (Chinese: 吴虹霓;) a Chinese mezzo-soprano opera singer.

== Early life and education ==
Wu was born in Jingdezhen, China. She studied at the Xinghai Conservatory of Music before to moving to the United States. In 2018 she graduated with a certificate in music from the Manhattan School of Music (MSM). While at MSM she was a pupil of Joan Patenaude-Yarnell and performed many roles in such operas as Sesto in La clemenza di Tito, Dragonfly in L'enfant et les sortilèges, Prince Orlofsky in Die Fledermaus and Angelina in La Cenerentola. The role of Angelina made her a winner at the Metropolitan Opera National Council Auditions, during which she also sang a bel canto piece from L'italiana in Algeri and during intermission performed an opening scene from Richard Strauss's Der Rosenkavalier.

== Career ==
After graduation, Wu left for Portland, Maine, where she made her professional debut as Cherubino in The Marriage of Figaro at the Opera Maine in July 2018. As of 2018 she resides in London where she is a member of the Jette Parker Young Artist Program at The Royal Opera, Covent Garden. In January 2019 Wu performed as Flora in Richard Eyre's production of La traviata – which she reprised in 2020 – and as Siébel in Faust, then sang as Mercédès in Barrie Kosky's production of Carmen and Second Lady in The Magic Flute with the Royal Opera. In May 2019 Wu performed a lead role of Phaedra with Southbank Sinfonia at the Linbury Theatre, Royal Opera House in London.

Aside from performances in the US, Wu also performs at her native China at the Shanghai Conservatory of Music, Yangzhou University of Music and Nanjing University of Music. She appeared on the CCTV's 15th National Young Singers' Concert in Beijing and on a parade during the celebration of the 65th anniversary of the founding of the People's Republic of China. She also sang at the Martina Arroyo Foundation's Prelude Gala Concert in New York.
