= Victoria Livengood =

American mezzo-soprano and voice teacher (born 1959)

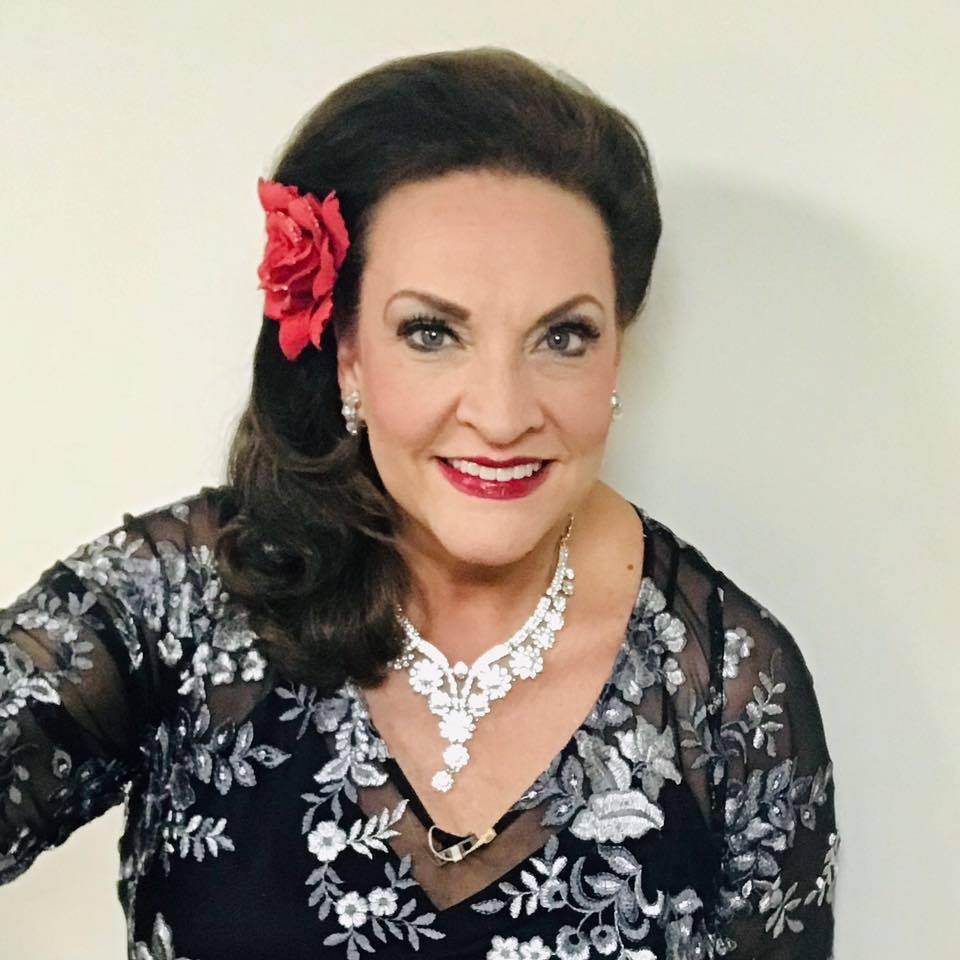
Victoria Livengood, Mezzo Soprano

Victoria Livengood (born August 8, 1959) is an American mezzo-soprano and voice teacher. She is most renown for her extensive and prestigious international operatic career spanning over 35 years and counting. Her past and current career sees her regularly in the top opera houses around the world. She has sung over 100 different operatic roles throughout her career and over 120 separate performances at the Metropolitan Opera. In her early years, she was most known for her portrayal of the title role of Carmen (sung opposite Plácido Domingo at the Metropolitan Opera) which she has performed over 250 times worldwide. In addition to her continued performance career, she also teaches voice privately in Concord, North Carolina.

== Childhood and education ==
Livengood was born and raised in Thomasville, North Carolina on a family-owned farm. She left her small town for the first time in 1979 to attend college. She holds a Bachelor of Music from University of North Carolina at Chapel Hill and a Master of Music from the Boston Conservatory at Berklee, and Honorary Doctorates from both Jacksonville University and her alma mater, Boston Conservatory at Berklee.

== Early career ==
Livengood made her first appearance at the Metropolitan Opera in 1985 in the Finalists' Concert for the Metropolitan Opera National Council Auditions. This skyrocketed her career and made her an instant, national professional in the field. Her stage debut at the same illustrious house came in 1991 as Laura in Luisa Miller conducted by James Levine. Since her debut at the MET, she has appeared in more than 125 performances with the company, and more than 15 roles including: the title role of Carmen, Prince Orlovsky in Die Fledermaus, Queen Isabella in The Voyage, Preziosilla in La forza del destino, Waltraute in Die Walküre, Maddalena in Rigoletto, Myrtle Wilson in The Great Gatsby, Hippolyta in A Midsummer Night's Dream, Lola in Cavalleria rusticana, and Sonyetka in Lady Macbeth of Mtsensk District.

In addition to her extensive career on the MET opera stage, Livengood has sung leading roles with other top operatic companies of America including: the Lyric Opera of Chicago, San Francisco Opera, Nickel City Opera, Los Angeles Opera, Santa Fe Opera, Washington National Opera in D.C., Seattle Opera, Houston Grand Opera, and New York City Opera. European and other international venues include: Barcelona, Madrid, Salzburg, Buenos Aires, Taipei, Las Palmas, Monte Carlo, Nice, Tel Aviv, Matsumoto, Seoul, Santiago, Cologne, Vancouver, Montreal, and at Italy's Spoleto Festival.

== Performance and teaching careers ==
Livengood still continues an active, international performing career in top opera houses around the world including: Washington National Opera, Opera Omaha, Seattle Opera, Houston Opera, and others. She also sits as an official judge for the Metropolitan Opera National Council Auditions, held annually. Livengood also maintains an active voice studio, and teaches privately out of her home in Concord, North Carolina. Her studio roster consists of both young-professional voice students, and leading, international professionals in the field.

== Honors and awards ==
- Nominated for a GRAMMY Award, Edward Thomas' Desire Under the Elms with the London Symphony Orchestra
- Inductee, North Carolina Music Hall of Fame
