= Veronica Tyler =

American soprano (1937–2020)

- Born: March 4, 1937; Baltimore
- Died: March 21, 2020 (aged 83)
- Alma mater: Peabody Institute; Juilliard School
- Occupation: Opera singer

Veronica Tyler (March 4, 1937 – March 21, 2020) was an American soprano.

Veronica Tyler was born in Baltimore, Maryland. She attended Frederick Douglass High School. One of the first African-Americans to attend the prestigious Peabody Institute after it opened to blacks in 1949, she and classmate Junetta Jones were still barred from the school cafeteria. She studied under Alice Duschak and graduated in 1960. She went on to study under Florence Page Kimball at the Juilliard School.

Her New York debut was in 1961 with the American Opera Society in Monteverdi's The Coronation of Poppea. That same year she appeared in the first of three appearances on Leonard Bernstein's television show Young People's Concerts, singing "Hello, Hello" from Menotti's The Telephone and "Mimi's Farewell" from La Boheme. The next summer she appeared on the television talk show Tonight Starring Jack Parr. In 1963, she won first prize at the International Music Competition in Munich.

1964 was her debut with the New York City Opera as Suzanna in Mozart's The Marriage of Figaro. In her second appearance on Bernstein's Young People's Concerts, she sang Micaela's Aria from Bizet's Carmen. That May, she starred as Bess in Gershwin's Porgy and Bess with the New York City Center Light Opera Company, alongside Robert Guillaume as Sportin' Life. In 1966, she won the silver medal at the International Tchaikovsky Competition in the Soviet Union. She and other American winners performed at the White House. In her final appearance on Young People's Concerts in 1967, she sang "Mi chiamano Mimi" from Puccini La Boheme and "My Man's Gone Now" from Porgy and Bess. On the program, Bernstein noted that the two songs required two very different vocal styles and praised Tyler's ability to perform both.

Tyler went on to teach at a number of institutions, including the University of Florida, University of Missouri, University of Michigan, and Morgan State University.

== Personal life ==
In 1961, she married Barry Hawkins, a marine architect. They had a daughter, Adriane.

== Discography ==
- The Passion of Christ in Spirituals (1980)
