= Polyna Savridi =

American opera singer (died 1980)

Polyna Savridi (died October 1, 1980) was an American operatic soprano and voice teacher. As a singer she was primarily active on the international stage during the 1960s, and only performed infrequently afterwards. She taught briefly on the voice faculties of Columbia University and the Jacobs School of Music during the early 1960s before settling at the University of Calgary where she was a professor of voice from 1963 until her death from cancer seventeen years later. She is best remembered for her recordings of Greek folk songs for Concord Records and as a winner of the Metropolitan Opera National Council Auditions.

== Life and career ==
Born in New York City and raised in Athens, Greece, and Boston, Massachusetts, Savridi earned a Bachelor of Music degree from the Longy School of Music in 1959 and later pursued graduate studies at the State Conservatory of Thessaloniki in Greece. In 1960 she won the Metropolitan Opera National Council Auditions. In 1961 she released her first recording, Polyna Savridi Sings of Greece, with Concord Records.

In 1960 Savridi won a McBride Scholarship, which enabled her to study singing in Italy. While there, she won two singing competitions and made her professional opera debut in 1961 as Mimì to Luciano Pavarotti's Rodolfo in La bohème at the Teatro Comunale Modena. In 1963 she performed the role of Giunone in Monteverdi's Il ritorno d'Ulisse in patria at the Teatro San Cassiano. She recorded the work that year for Turnabout/Vox Records. She was also a principal artist with the Bavarian State Opera and Theater Augsburg in Germany during the 1960s.

In 1965/66 Savridi went on a national tour with the Metropolitan Opera National Company, performing the title role in Puccini's Madama Butterfly, including performances at the John F. Kennedy Center for the Performing Arts, the Seattle Opera, and the Palacio de Bellas Artes in Mexico City. In 1971 she was the soprano soloist Joseph Haydn's Missa in angustiis with the Calgary Festival Chorus and conductor John Searchfield. In 1977 she portrayed Donna Elvira in Calgary Opera's production of Mozart's Don Giovanni with John Reardon in the title role.

Savridi taught voice at the Jacobs School of Music of Indiana University and Columbia University before joining the voice faculty at the University of Calgary in 1963. She taught at the University of Calgary until her death from cancer in 1980. She died in Calgary, Alberta, Canada. One of her pupils was Chinese soprano and voice teacher Rosaline Pi (畢永琴).

The Polyna Savridi Memorial Foundation at the University of Calgary annually grants entrance and undergraduate scholarships. The Savridi Singers, a Calgary-based choir, was established in 1986 in honor of Savridi's legacy.
