= Michael Fabiano =

American operatic tenor (born 1984)

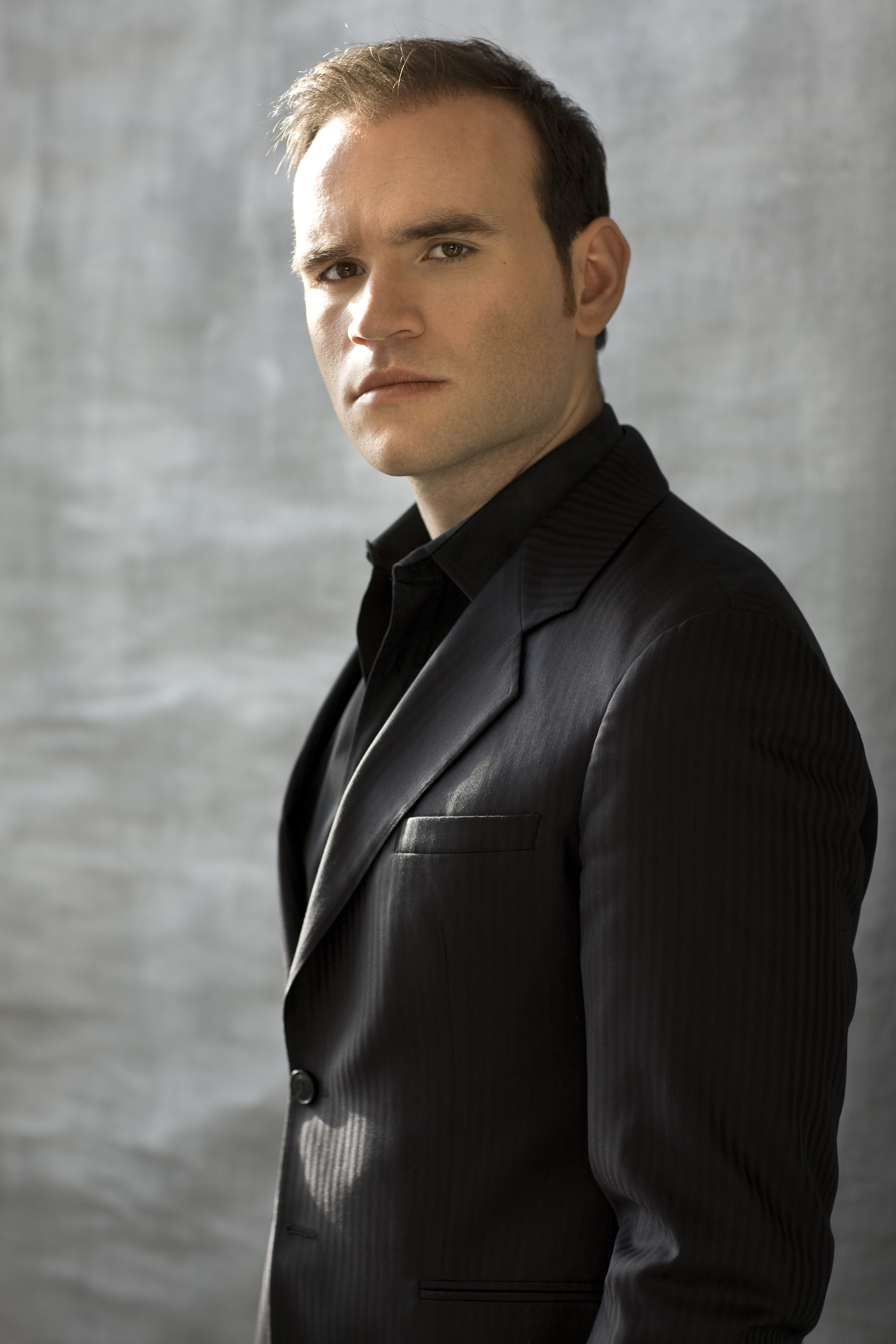
Michael Fabiano

Michael Fabiano (born May 8, 1984) is an American operatic tenor. Born in Montclair, New Jersey, he has performed in leading opera houses throughout the world, including the San Francisco Opera, Metropolitan Opera, Paris Opera, Sydney Opera, Teatro alla Scala, Canadian Opera Company, The Royal Opera, and Teatro Real de Madrid among many others. Fabiano is the 2014 Richard Tucker Award winner and the 2014 Beverly Sills Artist Award winner, making him the first singer to win both awards in the same year.

== Early years ==
Fabiano was a champion high school debater for Benilde-St. Margaret's high school in St. Louis Park, Minnesota. Fabiano was also a baseball umpire from the ages of 14 to 24. After briefly considering a career in business, Fabiano decided to study vocal performance at The University of Michigan. He graduated in just three years from the University of Michigan School of Music, Theatre & Dance in 2005 with a bachelor's degree in Vocal Performance. During his time there, he studied under tenor George Shirley, and performed several roles with the University Opera Theatre, including Rinuccio in Gianni Schicchi and Don Ottavio in Don Giovanni. He also studied extensively with soprano Julia Faulkner, with whom he still studies today. In the summer following graduation, he was an apprentice with the Santa Fe Opera, and in the autumn of that year he began his studies at the Academy of Vocal Arts in Philadelphia, where he studied under Bill Schuman. To date, he collaborates with his coaches and mentors, Laurent Philippe, Gioacchino Li Vigni and Neil Shicoff.

== Professional career ==
=== Early career ===
Fabiano made his stage debut in 2007 at the Stadttheater Klagenfurt as Alfredo in La traviata. In the same year, he made role debuts of Rinuccio in Gianni Schicchi and the title role of Mavra in Stravinsky's Mavra at the Greek National Opera. 2006 marked Fabiano's concert debut at Carnegie Hall as Don Antonio in Dom Sébastien with the Opera Orchestra of New York and conductor Eve Queler. In the beginning of 2008, Fabiano made his La Scala debut as Rinuccio in a production conducted by Riccardo Chailly. Debuts with the Philadelphia Orchestra as Rodolfo in La bohème, with the Minnesota Orchestra as Alfredo, and with Opera New Jersey as Alfredo followed. Fabiano has performed at the Teatro di San Carlo in Naples where he was seen as both Pinkerton in Madama Butterfly and Alfredo in La traviata. Il Duca in Rigoletto served as his role and opera house debut at English National Opera. January 2010 brought his debut at the Metropolitan Opera in New York as Raffaele in Stiffelio. Additionally, Fabiano has performed Rodolfo in La bohème with the Kansas City Lyric Opera, Pinkerton in Madama Butterfly at Opera Colorado, and the tenor soloist of Rossini's Stabat Mater in Spoleto.

During the 2010/11 season he made several international debuts, most notably as the duke in Rigoletto at the Dresden Semperoper, Edgardo in Lucia di Lammermoor at the Vancouver Opera, Gennaro in Lucrezia Borgia at the English National Opera in the world's first 3D LIVE Broadcast throughout Europe, and as Rodolfo in La bohème at the Deutsche Oper Berlin and Opéra de Limoges. In addition, Fabiano performed in his first Verdi Requiem with the Columbus Symphony. The season continued with debuts with the ABAO company in Bilbao as Edgardo and the Paris Opéra as Cassio in Verdi's Otello.

Appearances during the 2011/12 season began with a debut at the San Francisco Opera singing Gennaro in Lucrezia Borgia opposite soprano Renée Fleming. Other debuts in the season included performances with the Los Angeles Philharmonic as the Doctor in Shostakovich's newly discovered "Orango", Oper Köln in the Verdi Requiem, Teatro Real as Christian in Cyrano de Bergerac, Wiener Symphoniker in Elgar's Dream of Gerontius, in concert with the Cleveland Orchestra, and the Florida Grand Opera as the Duke of Mantua in Rigoletto. 2012/13 featured appearances at the Seattle Opera as Rodolfo in La bohème, at Opera Lyra in the same role, in concert with the Deutsche Oper Berlin for their annual AIDS gala, in concert with the Oslo Philharmonic in a televised performance of the Verdi Requiem, the Festival Casals in performances of the Verdi Requiem, the San Francisco Symphony in a series of Beethoven evenings featuring "An die ferne geliebte" and the "Missa Solemnis", and a duo of recitals with the "Jewel Series" in Kansas City alongside of pianist, Laurent Philippe and at the Mondavi Center with pianist John Churchwell. He appeared as Alfredo in La traviata during The Santa Fe Opera's summer 2013 festival season.

=== 2013 to 2015 ===
The following season, 2013/14, featured his return to the Paris Opera as Edgardo in Lucia di Lammermoor, a debut at the Canadian Opera Company as Rodolfo in La bohème, a concert performance of the Verdi Requiem at the San Francisco Opera in the conjunction with Teatro di San Carlo, a Kennedy Center Recital debut with pianist Danielle Orlando, a new production of Die Fledermaus as Alfred at the Metropolitan Opera, the title role of Corrado in Verdi's rarely performed Il corsaro with the Washington Concert Opera, a new production and professional debut as Faust with the Netherlands Opera, and a new production of La traviata with the Glyndebourne Festival. In 2014 Fabiano won both the Beverly Sills Artist Award, presented by the Metropolitan Opera, and the Richard Tucker Award.

In 2014 he sang Rodolfo, in a new production of La bohème at the San Francisco Opera, a role he also performed at the Metropolitan Opera. He also performed at a concert at Avery Fisher Hall during which he was presented with the Richard Tucker Award. Fabiano made his company debut with Opera Australia in February 2015 in David McVicar's production of Faust. He replaced an ailing colleague as Edgardo in Lucia di Lammermoor at the Metropolitan Opera on seven hours' notice, and opened the Glyndebourne Festival 2015, in Donizetti's Poliuto, in the first professional production of this opera in the UK. Fabiano is the recipient of Australia's Helpmann Award in the "Best Male Performance in an Opera" category, for his portrayal of the title role in Gounod's Faust with Opera Australia.

In the 2015/2016 season, Fabiano debuted two roles at the San Francisco Opera to rave reviews, Rodolfo in Luisa Miller and the title role in Don Carlo. He also sang Rodolfo in La bohème at Opernhaus Zürich, Lensky at the Royal Opera Covent Garden, and the Duke in Rigoletto with the Paris Opera.

=== 2016 to present ===
The 2016/2017 season brought his house debut with Houston Grand Opera in the title role of Faust as well as his debut with the Royal Danish Opera in the Verdi Requiem. Additionally, Fabiano performed at the Metropolitan Opera as Rodolfo in La bohème and Alfredo in La traviata, as well as returned to the San Francisco Symphony for an "all-Italian" program and Washington Concert Opera as John the Baptist in Hérodiade. In 2017, he also performed a recital tour which took him to seven cities in North America, and made his London recital debut at Wigmore Hall.

In the 2017/2018 season, Fabiano performed in La bohème at both the Royal Opera and the Metropolitan Opera. Additional performances include Des Grieux in Massenet's Manon at both the San Francisco Opera and at ABAO-OLBE, Edgardo in Lucia di Lammermoor at both Opera Australia and the Metropolitan Opera, and a recital for Oper Frankfurt. Fabiano will additionally be making his debut at Los Angeles Opera as the Duke in Rigoletto.

== ArtSmart Foundation ==
Along with John Viscardi, and Liz Letak, Fabiano co-founded ArtSmart in early 2016. ArtSmart is a nonprofit organization that provides free voice lessons to under-served students. The pilot program started in Newark, New Jersey in the autumn of 2016. In 2017, the organization expanded its service offerings to Philadelphia and San Francisco.

== Personal life ==
Fabiano is openly gay. He married New York marketing and branding consultant Bryan McCalister at New York's Metropolitan Opera House on October 28, 2018. They have since divorced. He enjoys piloting small planes on his days off.

== Videos ==
Streaming videos are available at Met Opera on Demand of his performances in the following operas:

- Verdi's La traviata (March 11, 2017)
- Puccini's La bohème (February 24, 2018)
- Massenet's Manon (October 26, 2019)

His 2015 performance of the title role of Donizetti's Poliuto is available in HD video for streaming at Glyndebourne Encore and as a Blu-ray disc on the Opus Arte label.

== Awards ==
- 2005: Grand Prize winner of the Florida Grand Opera Competition
- 2006: First Prize winner in the Licia Albanese Puccini Foundation Competition and a grand prize winner (and winner of the special Tenor Prize) in the Julián Gayarre Competition in Pamplona, Spain.
- 2007: A Grand Prize winner of the Metropolitan Opera National Council Auditions, Fabiano appears in a 2007 feature documentary film, The Audition, which tracked the lives and progress of the winners and participants of the Met's National Council Auditions.
- 2007: First Prize Winner of the Loren Zachary Competition and a Sarah Tucker Grant Recipient
- 2008: Winner of the First Prize of the Opera Index Awards
- 2009: Grand Prize winner from the Gerda Lissner Foundation
- 2014: The Beverly Sills Artist Award
- 2014: Richard Tucker Award

== Sources ==
- Serena Davies, "Michael Fabiano: A new breed of opera star", The Telegraph (London), February 28, 2015, on telegraph.co.uk. Retrieved March 1, 2015
