= Edna Garabedian =

American opera singer

Edna Garabedian is an American operatic mezzo-soprano, voice teacher, and opera director.

== Biography ==
Born to Armenian immigrants to the United States in Fresno, California, Garabedian studied singing with William Vennard at the University of Southern California, Lotte Lehmann at the University of California, Santa Barbara, Anna Hamlin in New York City, and Rosa Ponselle in Baltimore. In 1961 she won the Metropolitan Opera National Council Auditions. She made her professional opera debut in 1965 as Santuzza in Pietro Mascagni's Cavalleria rusticana with the New York City Opera. She went on to sing leading roles with the Baltimore Opera Company, the Bavarian State Opera, the Frankfurt Opera, the Houston Grand Opera, the Lyric Opera of Chicago, the San Diego Opera, the San Francisco Opera, the Staatsoper Stuttgart, the Staatstheater Kassel, and Theater Bonn among others.

In 2000 Garabedian founded the California Opera Association of which she, as of 2023, remains artistic director. She is a former faculty member of the voice departments at American University, California State University, Fresno, Northern Illinois University, and the University of San Francisco.
