= Lucille Kailer =

American operatic soprano (1925–2011)

Lucille Carrol Weinberger (née Kailer; December 7, 1925 – September 22, 2011) was an American operatic soprano who had an active international singing career during the 1950s and 1960s.

== Life and career ==
Lucille Carrol Kailer was born in Oconomowoc, Wisconsin on December 7, 1925. She studied voice at Marquette University, in Chicago with George Graham, and later in New York City with Julia Charol Drobner and Kurt Adler. She began her career appearing in minor roles at the Florentine Opera and leading roles with the Waukesha Opera Guild in Milwaukee, Wisconsin during the 1950s while simultaneously teaching on the voice faculty at the Wisconsin Conservatory of Music.

In 1958, Kailer won the Metropolitan Opera National Council Auditions. The following year she made her debut with the New York City Opera (NYCO) as Musetta in La boheme. She made her stage debut at the Metropolitan Opera in 1961 as one of the Flower Maidens in Parsifal with Ramon Vinay in the title role. She had previously appeared as Juliette in Charles Gounod's Roméo et Juliette with the Mobile Opera and as Adele in Die Fledermaus and Zerbinetta in Ariadne auf Naxos with the NYCO in 1959. She had also been working as a featured singer in Radio City Music Hall's variety show in 1960.

In 1962, Kailer made her debut at the Philadelphia Lyric Opera Company as Oscar in Un ballo in maschera with Richard Tucker as Riccardo and Robert Merrill as Renato. She sang the same role for her debut at the Lyric Opera of Chicago in 1963 with Régine Crespin as Amelia and Grace Bumbry as Ulrica. That same year she made her European debut at the Zurich Opera as Blondchen in Mozart's Die Entführung aus dem Serail. She remained committed to that house for the next several seasons, portraying such roles as Gilda in Rigoletto, Nanetta in Falstaff, Oscar in Un ballo in maschera, and Pamina in The Magic Flute among others.

In 1965 Kailer made her debut at the San Francisco Opera as Yniold in Pelléas et Mélisande and returned to the Met to sing Fiakermilli in Arabella. In 1966 she portrayed the title heroine in Douglas Moore's The Ballad of Baby Doe with the Central City Opera. During the late 1960s she was active with municipal opera houses in Germany.

Kailer married Richard Weinberger, and later resided in California. She died on September 22, 2011, at the age of 85.
