= Karen Williams (soprano) =

American opera singer

Karen Williams is an American concert and opera soprano. In 1985 she won the Metropolitan Opera National Council Auditions; making her stage debut at the Metropolitan Opera later that year as Serena in George Gershwin's Porgy and Bess. She sang that role at the Met again in 1989–1990. She has also performed Serena at Symphony Hall, Springfield with the Boston Concert Opera (1986), the Milwaukee Symphony Orchestra (1998), the Buffalo Philharmonic Orchestra (1999), the Utah Symphony Orchestra (1999), and the Philadelphia Orchestra (2000) among others. In 1986 she made her debut with the Opera Company of Philadelphia as Amelia in Verdi's Un ballo in maschera.

In 1987 Williams was a soloist in Gustav Mahler's Symphony No. 8 with the Chicago Symphony Orchestra and conductor James Levine. That same year she was the soprano soloist in Leoš Janáček's Amarus and in works by Giuseppe Verdi with the Collegiate Chorale and conductor Robert Bass at Carnegie Hall. She sang under Bass again at Carnegie Hall in 1989 as Maria in the New York premiere of Richard Strauss' Friedenstag. In 1988 she performed the role of Donna Elvira in Wolfgang Amadeus Mozart's Don Giovanni with the Florida Grand Opera. In November 1989 she was the soprano soloist in Verdi's Requiem with the Haifa Symphony Orchestra in Israel. She has also sung in concerts with the Boston Symphony Orchestra and in roles with the Dallas Opera, the Dayton Opera, the Lake George Opera, the Lyric Opera of Kansas City, and the Pittsburgh Opera.
