= Joan Wall (mezzo-soprano) =

American opera singer

Joan Boyd Wall (born in Baton Rouge) is a retired American operatic mezzo-soprano, voice teacher, and author on the art of singing. In 1957 she was a finalist in the Metropolitan Opera National Council Auditions. She was a principal performer at the Metropolitan Opera, and the Deutsche Oper Berlin, and in Amsterdam, Boston, Philadelphia, Fort Worth and other US cities. Wall was the coordinator of vocal studies at Texas Woman's University for many years. She was appointed professor emerita in 2008 following a teaching career of 44 years at TWU.

Wall is the author of International Phonetic Alphabet for Singers: A manual for English and foreign language diction (Pst. Incorporated, 1989); a text which is widely used as a university/music conservatory textbook in the United States. She has co-authored several books on singing, including Anyone Can Sing: How to become the singer you always wanted (Doubleday, 1978), Diction for Singers, Mastering the Fundamentals: Excellence in Singing: Multilevel Learning, Multilevel Teaching (Caldwell Publishing Company, 2001), and Managing Vocal Health: Teaching and learning vocal health (Caldwell Publishing, 2001).

== Roles ==
Joan Wall has performed many roles including:

- Preziosilla in La forza del destino
- Carmen in Carmen
- Dorabella in Così fan tutte
- Suzuki in Madame Butterfly
- Cherubino in The Marriage of Figaro
- Augusta in The Ballad of Baby Doe
- Nicklaus in The Tales of Hoffmann
- Fyodor in Boris Godunov

== Academic education ==
- 1956 – Bachelor of Music, Louisiana State University

== Family ==
- Joan Wall was married to Mark Wall from 1955 to 1972. She was married to Ernest Lee Ludwick from 1974 until 2015. Ludwick was a photo-reconnaissance pilot for the U.S. Navy during World War II. After the war he worked as a commercial artist and art director for Texlite Industries. Her father, a Methodist minister, died when she was nine. Her mother, who sang in the church choir and was the first violinist to graduate from Louisiana State University, remarried Julian C. Hays, a business man.
