= Elizabeth Bishop (mezzo-soprano) =

American operatic mezzo-soprano

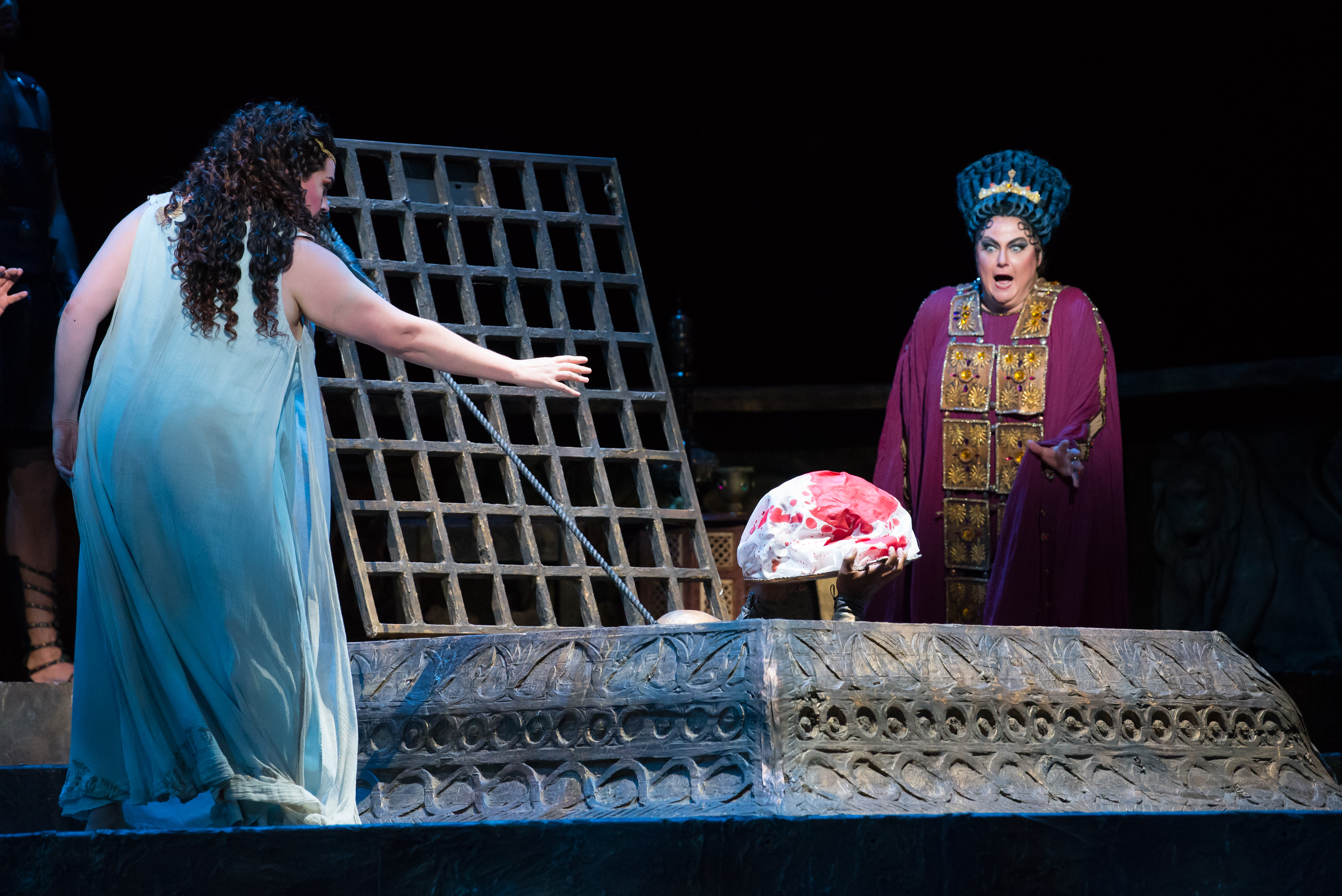
- Bishop (right) as Herodias in Salome at the Florida Grand Opera in 2018

Background information
- Born: South Carolina, US
- Genre: Opera
- Instrument: Voice
- Website: https://www.elizabethbishopvoice.com/

Elizabeth Bishop is an American mezzo-soprano and voice teacher. She has sung at the Metropolitan Opera more than 100 times, and is generally known for playing prominent supporting roles in major operas.

== Early life ==
Born in South Carolina, Bishop studied at Furman University and obtained a double BA in Political Science and Music. She then decided to pursue a career in opera, and trained at the Juilliard School. She won the 1993 Metropolitan Opera National Council Auditions and accepted a role at the San Francisco Opera as an Adler Fellow in 1994.

== Career ==
=== Operatic career ===
She has been most closely associated with the Washington National Opera, the San Francisco Opera, and the Metropolitan Opera. Her versatile operatic roles have included Emilia (Otello), Eboli (Don Carlo), Meg Page (Falstaff), La Marquise de Merteuil (The Dangerous Liaisons), Suzuki (Madama Butterfly), and her frequent role of Mère Marie in Poulenc's Dialogues des Carmélites. She has also often appeared as Wagnerian heroines, including Fricka, Waltraute, and Second Norn (Der Ring des Nibelungen) and Brangäne (Tristan und Isolde). In 2013, she gained attention for becoming one of the few artists to perform two major roles in one day at the Metropolitan Opera, namely Mère Marie in Dialogues des Carmélites and Fricka in Wagner's Das Rheingold. Anthony Tommasini of the New York Times described this event, calling her performance "vocally lustrous".

On the concert platform, Bishop often performs Mahler, with Das Lied von der Erde, and Mahler's Second, Third and Eighth Symphonies in her repertoire.

Speaking about her own career to The Washington Post, Bishop stated: "I have made a decent career out of being the world's best fourth choice. They can't get the star, they can't get the old star, they can't get the new girl who is coming up: Let's call Betsy. She can do anything".

=== Teaching ===
Bishop is a voice teacher at the Juilliard School and The Peabody Institute and has been a guest instructor at other major universities. She is currently a faculty voice instructor with the Cafritz Young Artist Program at Washington National Opera. In addition, she has taught at the Aspen Music Festival, Chautauqua School of Music, Wolf Trap Opera Company, the Collaborative Piano Institute, and Washington National Opera Institute for Young Singers.

Bishop formed the Potomac Vocal Institute in 2014 with pianist Patrick O'Donnell. The institute's stated vision is "To bridge the gap between academia and the stage and shift the paradigm for how successful operatic careers begin."

== Personal life ==
Bishop's husband, Ken Weiss, works at the Washington National Opera as a voice coach. The couple, who have a daughter, live in Northern Virginia.
