= Esther Heideman =

American operatic soprano

Esther Heideman (born February 14, 1970, Wisconsin) is an American operatic soprano. She has performed with several orchestras including the New York Philharmonic, the Metropolitan Opera, the Chicago Symphony, the Baltimore Symphony, the St. Paul Chamber Orchestra, the Minnesota Orchestra, the Pittsburgh Symphony, the Atlanta Symphony, the Cincinnati Symphony, and the Seattle Symphony. Her debut appearance with the Metropolitan Opera led The New York Times to report that when "hearing this lively redheaded coloratura sing, it's impossible not to think: Beverly Sills." In the press her work has been largely well received. The Boston Globe reported that Heideman possesses a "drop dead gorgeous voice." The Washington Post wrote that Heideman sings in "sweet tones, like an angel." The Star Tribune called her a "silvery-voiced" singer." Heideman has won the Metropolitan Opera National Council Auditions and is a winner of the Licia Albanese competition. She was educated at the University of Wisconsin-Eau Claire. In 2000 she won the Metropolitan Opera National Council Auditions.
