= Tichina Vaughn =

American operatic mezzo-soprano

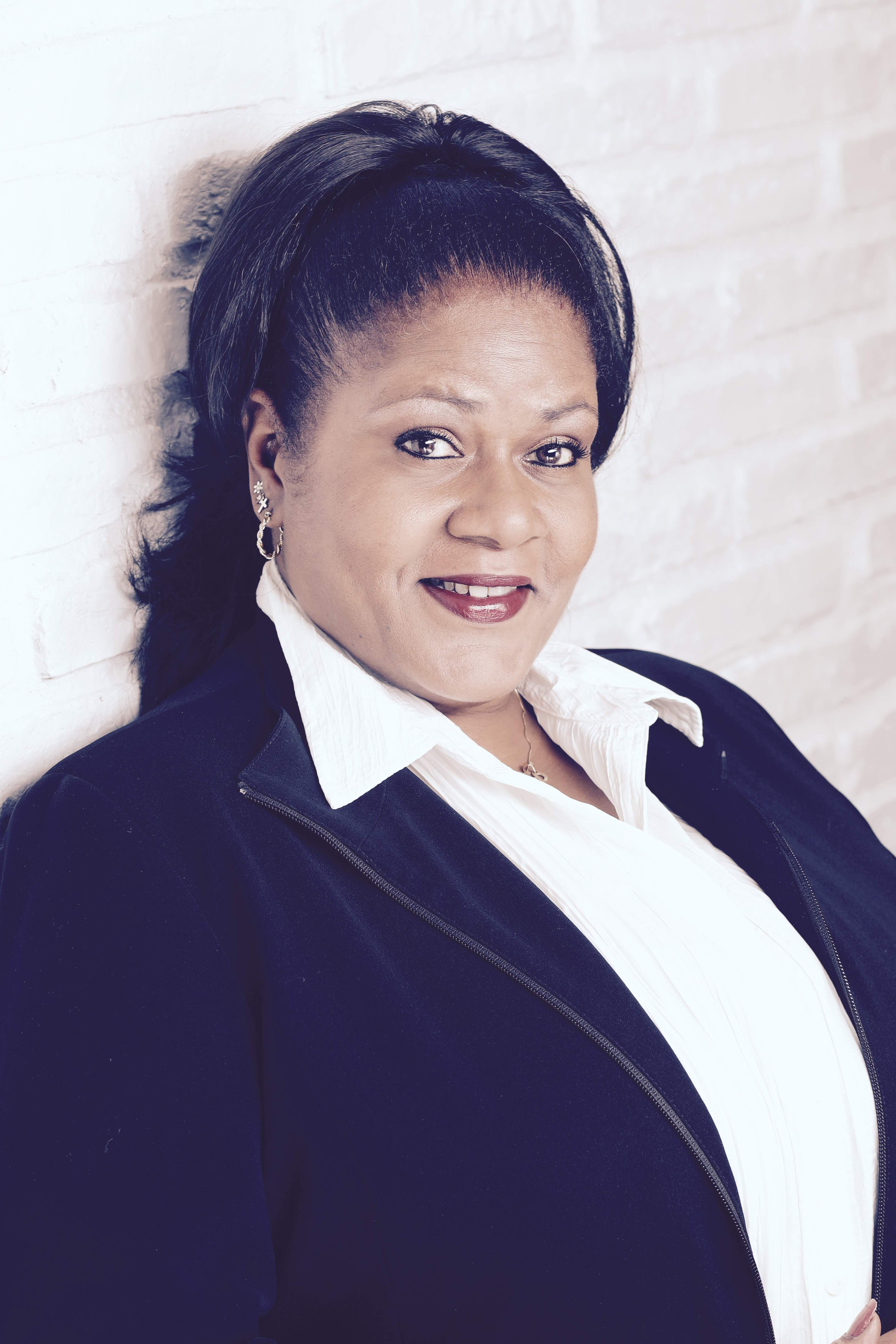
- Tichina Vaughn American Mezzosoprano
- Born: Tichina Vaughn; 19 September 1965 (age 60); Baltimore, United States
- Education: North Carolina School of arts Georgia State University Metropolitan Opera young artists program
- Occupation: Operatic mezzo-soprano
- Awards: Kammersängerin, Staatstheater Stuttgart

Tichina Vaughn (born 19 September 1965) is an American operatic dramatic mezzo-soprano active internationally in opera, concert halls and recitals. Starting at the Lindemann Young Artist Development Program at the Metropolitan Opera, her American career expanded into Europe, as member of the permanent ensembles of the Semperoper in Dresden and the Stuttgart Opera, where she was awarded the title of Kammersängerin in 2006. She has been a regular at the Arena di Verona and other major theaters worldwide, singing a wide repertoire span, with a "voluminous and dark mezzo" voice the dramatic Verdi roles such as Amneris in Aida, Eboli in Don Carlo, Azucena in Il trovatore and Ulrica in Un ballo in maschera, Wagner's Ortrud Lohengrin, Venus Tannhäuser, Fricka Die Walküre, Waltraute in Götterdämmerung and Strauss, Herodias in Salome and Klytemnestra in Elektra. According to Opernglas, Vaughn has a natural "great intensity" on stage, with an ample "voice, which flows richly, even in the low registers." The Neue Zürcher Zeitung describes her voice as an "enchanting satisfyingly rich mezzosoprano". Bernard Holland of The New York Times called hers "A voice of quality", which had "the presence and personality that might well fit the Met... a mezzo-soprano whose strong upper register gave hints of a dramatic soprano to come".

== Early life and education ==
Born in Baltimore, Maryland to Lucinda Vaughn, a single mother, Tichina Vaughn was raised in Winston-Salem, NC where she began singing at 6 years old in the Tots Choir at Shiloh Baptist Church. She studied the clarinet and played in concert and marching bands. At Northside High School for the Performing Arts (currently North Atlanta High School) she began performing as featured singer with the Touring Company graduating in May 1983. In September 1983 Vaughn began formal vocal study with the mezzo-soprano Florence Kopleff at Georgia State University. In January 1985, Vaughn studied at the University of North Carolina school of the Arts (now UNCSA) under Prof. Fredric Moses. Vaughn also attended the American Institute of Musical Studies in Graz, Austria, where she was a finalist in the Meistersinger Competition in 1987. She earned her bachelor's degree in Vocal Performance from UNCSA in 1989 and was engaged at Wolf Trap Opera as a Filene Artist in the summers of 1989 and 1990.

== American career ==
She began her professional career as a member of The Lindemann Young Artist Development Program at the Metropolitan Opera after winning The Metropolitan Opera National Council Auditions in April 1989. She made her stage debut at the Met in 1990 as a member of the Young Artist Program singing under Nello Santi, John Fiore and James Levine. Vaughn's first leading role was Amneris in Verdi's Aida at the Seattle Opera in 1992. This success prompted invitations for Aida from Detroit Opera (1993), Opera Pacific (1995), Tulsa Opera (1997), and Hong Kong Opera Society (1997), and established her as a young Verdi mezzo-soprano. Additional Verdian leading roles in the early years included Princess Eboli in Don Carlos in Seattle (1993), and the Requiem in Santiago, Chile (1992), Buenos Aires (1992), and San Antonio Symphony (1993).

== International career ==
Since the late 1990s Vaughn has worked internationally. Singing mostly mainstream Italian repertoire, Vaughn added numerous roles in German. Boris Gruhl wrote of her Klytemnestra in Elektra, "The manner in which she expresses (Klytemnestra's) nightmares is deeply harrowing. She has the right timbre for the tragedy of the guilty queen, and her scenes of desperate loneliness make her a tragic partner for Elektra." Vaughn's Venus in Tannhäuser at the Hamburg State Opera "bewitched her minstrel with her charmingly sensual, powerful mezzo and her personal charisma. Even in her short appearance in the third act, one could feel the presence of her strong personality." Her "superbly dramatic Herodias" in Salome became a signature role in Stuttgart, Frankfurt and Dresden.

From 1998 to 2006 Tichina Vaughn was principal artist in the ensemble of the Staatsoper Stuttgart where she made her European debut as Mrs. Quickly in Verdi's Falstaff in August 1996 and was awarded the title of Kammersängerin in 2006. Roles performed included Azucena in Verdi's Il Trovatore conducted by Nicola Luisotti, and Arnalta in Monteverdi's L'incoronazione di Poppea conducted by Nicholas Kok, Eboli in Verdi' Don Carlo, Widow Begbick in Weill's Rise and Fall of the City of Mahagonny, Venus in Tannhäuser, Giulietta in Offenbach's The Tales of Hoffmann, Fricka in Wagner's Die Walküre, Waltraute in Götterdämmerung and Erda in Das Rheingold and Siegfried. Her discography in Stuttgart includes the Stuttgart Opera Ring cycle filmed for DVD distribution by Euro Arts and recorded for Naxos.

From 2010 to 2018 Vaughn was a principal artist in the ensemble of the Semperoper where she was heard as Azucena conducted by Daniel Oren, Venus conducted by Asher Fisch, Ortrud in Wagner's Lohengrin, Herodias, Eboli, Jezibaba in Stefan Herheim's production of Rusalka, Orlofsky in Die Fledermaus by Johann Strauss, Isabella in Rossini's L'Italiana in Algeri, Suzuki in Puccini's Madama Butterfly, Grand Vestale in La Vestale conducted by Gabriele Ferro, Cornelia in Handel's Giulio Cesare, the Mother in Il Prigioniero, Brigitta in Korngold's Die Tote Stadt among others.

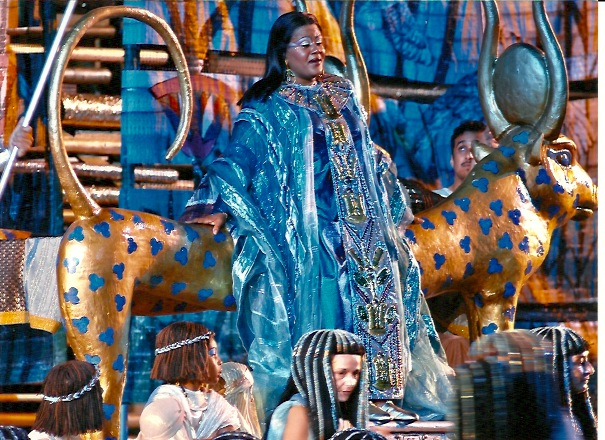
Amneris, Arena di Verona 2006

She made her Arena di Verona debut as Amneris in 2003 and returned there in 2004, 2005, 2006, 2010, and 2012 working with conductors Marco Armiliato, Placido Domingo, Daniel Oren, Vjekoslav Šutej and Piergiorgio Morandi. She has sung Ulrica in Verdi's Un ballo in maschera in many world stages, notably at the San Francisco Opera, and Graz Opera. Teatro Massimo Palermo, Ancona, Verona and Dresden.

Vaughn's "full-blooded Azucena" in Il Trovatore in a Stuttgart performance, "with her room-filling presence, her vocal flexibility and vibrant top is a powerful representation of this role." She appeared as Azucena at the Greek National Opera, Hungarian National Opera, Sacramento Opera, Teatro Verdi Trieste, and Teatro Carlo Felice.

Vaughn sang three roles, Serena, Maria and Lily, in Gershwin's Porgy and Bess, at the Metropolitan Opera with James Levine, the Kennedy Center with Bobby McFerrin, and the English National Opera, Teatro alla Scala, Bregenzer Festspiele, Miscolc Festival, Ravinia Festival, Opera Carolina, Chicago Symphony Orchestra and the Dutch National Opera where she also created the role of 'Mother of Aida' in Micha Hamels Caruso in Cuba.

Other appearances as a guest artist were at the Los Angeles Opera (Frugola in Puccini's Il Tabarro with James Conlon), Finnish National Opera, The Israeli Opera (Verdi Requiem), Korea National Opera (Mrs. Quickly in Verdi's Falstaff), Candide in Lyon, and Oper Frankfurt.

== Concert ==
Major concerts include appearances in Santiago de Chile (Verdi Requiem), Atlanta Symphony orchestra, American Symphony, NDR, Teatro Petruzzelli Bari (Aleksander Nevsky) under Julian Kovachev, Berliner Festspiele, Elbphilharmonie Hamburg, the Taipei Symphony under Roberto Abbado, and the Kennedy Center (Missa Solemnis), She frequently performs Lieder and other recitals with partners such as Maris Skuja, Wolfgang Heinz, Lars Jönsson, Nicola Luisotti, and Eytan Pessen at the piano. Vaughn is also a versatile Jazz and gospel performer.

== Personal life ==
In December 1992 Vaughn married singer Derrick Lawrence. Their union produced two children and ended in divorce in December 2007. In 2015 Vaughn was chosen as 'Role Model Beyond Beauty' by OTC beauty magazine, highlighting "women of color who have made significant advances in their careers and who have given back to their communities." Her portrait by Leo Rucker, commissioned by OTC, was part of an exhibition in Winston-Salem, NC and other places. Vaughn has received awards from the Metropolitan Opera National Council, the Richard Tucker Foundation the Opera Index Vocal Competition, Licia Albanese-Puccini Foundation, Robert M. Jacobson grants, Heritage Foundation Award, the Foundation Award of the Birgit Nilsson Foundation, and the Consul General's Award for Cultural Diplomacy from the Consulate General Milan.

Vaughn is active as a singing teacher and regularly gives masterclasses in Europe and the United States, including Dresden, Stuttgart, the Metropolitan Opera New York City and North Carolina. She is also an associate professor of Voice at the Jacobs School of Music in Bloomington.

== Recordings (audio) ==
- 2005 Christmas at My House, Lars Jönsson Piano. Bauer Studios, Animato (LC 05187) ACD 6085
- 2006 Stuttgarter Ring Cycle, Naxos
- 2012 Schwanda, der Dudelsackpfeifer Semperoper Edition Vol.8
- 2019 Porgy and Bess, Metropolitan Opera

== Video ==
- Puccini Il Tabarro
- Wagner: Die Walküre (Lothar Zagrosek, Christof Nel)
- Film: Directed by Susheel Bibbs, Voices for freedom, The Hyer's sisters legacy, The heritage foundation.

== Repertoire (Opera) ==
- Bernstein Candide – Old Lady
- Dallapiccola Il prigioniero – Mother Semperoper Dresden
- Dvorak Rusalka – Jezibaba
- Handel Giulio Cesare in Egitto – Cornelia
- Henze Der Junge Lord – Staatstheater Hannover
- Korngold die Tote Stadt – Brigitta Semperoper Dresden
- Monteverdi Il ritorno d'Ulisse in patria – Arnalta Staatstheater Stuttgart
- Offenbach Tales of Hoffmann – Giulietta Staatstheater Stuttgart
- Puccini Il Tabarro – Frugola Los Angeles Opera
- Puccini Madama Butterfly – Suzuki Semperoper Dresden
- Puccini Suor Angelica – Principessa
- Rossini L'italiana in Algeri – Isabella Semperoper Dresden
- Spontini La Vestale – Le Grand Vestale
- Strauss Elektra – Klytemnestra
- Strauss Salome – Herodias
- Strauss, J Die Fledermaus – Orloffsky
- Verdi Aida – Amneris
- Verdi Ballo in Maschera – Ulrica
- Verdi Don Carlo – Princess Eboli
- Verdi Falstaff – Madame Quickly
- Verdi Masked Ball – Ulrica
- Verdi Il Trovatore – Azucena
- Wagner Der fliegender Holländer – Marie
- Wagner Lohengrin – Ortrud
- Wagner Tannhauser – Venus
- Wagner Das Rheingold – Erda
- Wagner Die Walkure – Fricka
- Wagner Siegfried – Erda
- Wagner Die Götterdämmerung – Waltraute
- Weill Aufstieg und Fall der Stadt Mahagonny – Leokadja Begbick
- Weinberger Schwanda the Bagpiper – Ice Queen

== Repertoire (Oratorio) ==
- Beethoven: Missa solemnis
- Beethoven: Symphony No. 9
- Berlioz Les nuits d'été
- Bernstein Jeremiah Symphony Nr. 1
- Brahms Alto Rhapsody
- Handel Messiah
- Mahler Lieder eines fahrenden Gesellen
- Mahler Kindertotenlieder
- Mahler Symphony No. 2 "Resurrection"
- Prokofiev Alexander Nevsky
- Verdi Requiem

== Interviews and newspaper articles ==
- Sächsische Zeitung July 7, 2020, "Eine Opernstimme gegen Rassismus" Interview about Black lives matter, living in Dresden (in German)
- Sächsische Zeitung, December 2, 2016, Interview with Bernd Klempnow
- Stuttgart Kultur Kaffee 2002
- Stuttgarter Zeitung
- The Crisis
- Orpheus Magazine (in German) Tichina Vaughn - Vielseitig uns auf dem Weg nach Oben(picture on cover and interview)
- ZDF Aspekte Interview in German, with Jo Schück from ZDF Aspekte
- Seattle Opera Blog, May 14, 2014, Discussion about the situation in Dresden since the Pegida Movement.
- Classical Singers Magazine, November 1, 2006, Center Stage Interview, Tichina Vaughn, Mezzo Soprano

== YouTube links ==
- Azucena in Verdi's Il Trovatore (Genova)
- Waltraute in Wagner's Götterdämmerung
- Ives, Serenity, Mozartsaal Stuttgart, Eytan Pessen Piano
- Sweet little Jesus boy
- Metropolitan Opera Interview
