= Metropolitan Opera Eric and Dominique Laffont Competition =

American opera competition (1954– )

The Metropolitan Opera Eric and Dominique Laffont Competition (formerly the Metropolitan Opera National Council Auditions) is an annual singing competition sponsored by the Metropolitan Opera. Established in 1954, its purpose is to discover, assist, promote, and develop young opera singers. The competition is held in four stages: Districts, Regional, Semi-Final, and Final competitions. Each stage is judged by a panel of representatives from the Metropolitan Opera. There are a total of 14 regional competitions within the United States, Canada and Puerto Rico, and 42 district competitions within each region. Winners from the district competition compete in Regionals, and then the winners of regionals are awarded a trip to New York City where they compete on the stage of the Metropolitan Opera in the National Semi-Final Competition. Approximately 10 semi-finalists are chosen to compete in the final competition; the five winners are awarded a grand prize of $15,000 each, and the remaining finalists receive $5,000.

== National winners ==
=== 1950s ===
- Ethel Wagner DeLong, soprano (1954)
- Charlotte Reincke, soprano (1955)
- William Black, tenor (1956)
- Dorothy Cole Posch, mezzo-soprano (1956)
- Robert Nagy, tenor (1956)
- Robert Mosley, baritone (1957)
- Joan Wall, mezzo-soprano (1957)
- Felicia Weathers, soprano (1957)
- Grace Bumbry, mezzo-soprano (1958)
- Barbara Faulkner, mezzo-soprano (1958)
- Lucille Kailer, soprano (1958)
- Barbara Leichsenring, soprano (1958)
- Jefferson Morris, tenor (1958)
- Ronald Holgate, bass-baritone (1959)
- Norman Mittelmann, baritone (1959)
- Roald Reitan, baritone (1959)
- Ann Scott, soprano (1959)
- Teresa Stratas, soprano (1959)

=== 1960s ===
- Mary Jennings, soprano (1960)
- Mary MacKenzie, mezzo-soprano (1960)
- Spiro Malas, bass-baritone (1960)
- Lavergne Monette, soprano (1960)
- Polyna Savridi, soprano (1960)
- Benita Valente, soprano (1960)
- Billie Lynn Daniel, soprano (1961)
- Maria de Francesca-Cavazza, soprano (1961)
- Edna Garabedian, mezzo-soprano (1961)
- Francesca Roberto, soprano (1961)
- George Shirley, tenor (1961)
- Shirley Verrett, mezzo-soprano (1961)
- Elizabeth Fischer, mezzo-soprano (1962)
- June Genovese, mezzo-soprano (1962)
- Kay Griffel, soprano (1962)
- Janis Martin, soprano (1962)
- James McCray, tenor (1962)
- Carol Toscano, soprano (1962)
- Veronica Tyler-Scott, soprano (1962)
- William Walker, baritone (1962)
- Russell Christopher, baritone (1963)
- Justino Díaz, bass-baritone (1963)
- Junetta Jones, soprano (1963)
- Michael Trimble, tenor (1963)
- Gene Boucher, baritone (1964)
- Maria Candida, soprano (1964)
- Robert Goodloe, baritone (1964)
- Katherine Kaufman, soprano (1964)
- Mary Beth Peil, soprano (1964)
- Huguette Tourangeau, mezzo-soprano (1964)
- Loretta Di Franco, soprano (1965)
- Gretchen D'Armand, soprano (1965)
- Theodore Lambrinos, baritone (1965)
- Claudia Lindsey, soprano (1965)
- Maria Pellegrini Macko, soprano (1965)
- Will Roy, bass-baritone (1965)
- Richard Stilwell, bass-baritone (1965)
- Karan Armstrong, soprano (1966)
- Dominic Cossa, baritone (1966)
- Conrad Immel, baritone (1966)
- Gwendolyn Killebrew, mezzo-soprano (1966)
- Evelyn Mandac, soprano (1966)
- Marylyn Mulvey, soprano (1966)
- Gail Robinson, soprano (1966)
- Annie Walker, soprano (1966)
- Costanza Cuccaro, soprano (1967)
- Sakiko Kanamori, soprano (1967)
- Paula Page, soprano (1967)
- Jacquelyn Benson, soprano (1968)
- William Cochran, tenor (1968)
- Patricia Craig, soprano (1968)
- Judith Forst, mezzo-soprano (1968)
- Glenys Fowles, soprano (1968)
- Gwendolyn Jones, mezzo-soprano (1968)
- Jessye Norman, soprano (1968)
- Nancy Shade, soprano (1968)
- Ruth Welting, soprano (1968)
- Loretta Ziskin, soprano (1968)
- Elaine Cormany, soprano (1969)
- Gilda Cruz-Romo, soprano (1969)
- James Johnson, bass-baritone (1969)
- Eugenie Chopin Watson, soprano (1969)
- Frederica von Stade, mezzo-soprano (1969)

=== 1970s ===
- Jeannine Altmeyer, soprano (1970)
- Barbara Pearson, soprano (1971)
- Christine Weidinger, soprano (1972)
- Douglas Ahlstedt, tenor (1973)
- Alma Jean Smith, soprano (1974)
- Carmen Balthrop, soprano (1975)
- John Carpenter, tenor (1976)
- Ashley Putnam, soprano (1976)
- Vinson Cole, tenor (1977)
- Wendy White, mezzo-soprano (1978)
- Winifred Faix Brown, soprano (1978)
- Jane Bunnell, mezzo-soprano (1979)
- Pamela Hicks, soprano (1979)
- Dianne Iauco, mezzo-soprano (1979)
- Sandra McClain, soprano (1979)
- Robert McFarland, baritone (1979)
- Jan Opalach, bass-baritone (1979)
- Robert Wood Overman, baritone (1979)
- Natalia Rom, soprano (1979)
- Susan St. John, soprano (1979)
- Michael Talley, tenor (1979)
- Delores Ziegler, mezzo-soprano (1979)

=== 1980s ===
- Marjo Carroll, soprano (1980)
- Louise Deal-Pluymen, soprano (1980)
- John Fowler, tenor (1980)
- Kevin Langan, bass (1980)
- Darren Nimnicht, baritone (1980)
- Lani Norskog, soprano (1980)
- Robin Reed, tenor (1980)
- Leslie Richards, mezzo-soprano (1980)
- Margaret Vazquez, soprano (1980)
- Lauren Wagner, soprano (1980)
- Thomas Woodman, baritone (1980)
- Laurence Albert, bass (1981)
- Lawrence Bakst, tenor (1981)
- Rebecca Cook, soprano (1981)
- Gail Dobish, soprano (1981)
- Gail Dubinbaum, mezzo-soprano (1981)
- Susan Dunn, soprano (1981)
- Joyce Guyer, soprano (1981)
- Thomas Hampson, baritone (1981)
- Diane Kesling, mezzo-soprano (1981)
- Laura Brooks Rice, mezzo-soprano (1981)
- Valerie Yova, soprano (1981)
- Lucille Beer, mezzo-soprano (1982)
- Angela Maria Blasi, soprano (1982)
- Pamela Coburn, soprano (1982)
- Carla Cook, mezzo-soprano (1982)
- Nancy Gustafson, soprano (1982)
- Hong Hei-kyung, soprano (1982)
- Walter MacNeil, tenor (1982)
- Sylvia McNair, soprano (1982)
- Katharine Ritz, soprano (1982)
- Kathleen Segar, mezzo-soprano (1982)
- Eduardo Villa, tenor (1982)
- Harolyn Blackwell, soprano (1983)
- Linda Caple, mezzo-soprano (1983)
- Jean Glennon, soprano (1983)
- Elizabeth Holleque, soprano (1983)
- Ellen Kerrigan, soprano (1983)
- Joanne Kolomyjec, soprano (1983)
- Alessandra Marc, soprano (1983)
- Cecily Nall, soprano (1983)
- Herbert Perry, bass-baritone (1983)
- Jo Ann Pickens, soprano (1983)
- Stella Zambalis, soprano (1983)
- Elaine Arandes, soprano (1984)
- Philip Bologna, tenor (1984)
- Richard Croft, tenor (1984)
- Gerald Dolter, baritone (1984)
- Marcus Haddock, tenor (1984)
- Theresa Hamm, soprano (1984)
- Cynthia Lawrence, soprano (1984)
- Emily Manhart, mezzo-soprano (1984)
- Lisa Saffer, soprano (1984)
- Nova Thomas, soprano (1984)
- Jonathan Welch, tenor (1984)
- Stephen Biggers, baritone (1985)
- Maryte Bizinkauskas, soprano (1985)
- Philip Cokorinos, bass-baritone (1985)
- Richard Cowan, bass-baritone (1985)
- Julia Faulkner, soprano (1985)
- Anne Johnson, soprano (1985)
- Victoria Livengood, mezzo-soprano (1985)
- Deborah Voigt, soprano (1985)
- Karen Williams, soprano (1985)
- Margaret Jane Wray, soprano (1985)
- Donna Maria Zapola, soprano (1985)
- Mark Baker, tenor (1986)
- Susan Bender, soprano (1986)
- Andrea Cawelti, soprano (1986)
- Mark S. Doss, bass-baritone (1986)
- Gordon Hawkins, baritone (1986)
- Barbara Kilduff, soprano (1986)
- Kim Marie Kodes, mezzo-soprano (1986)
- Marilyn Mims, soprano (1986)
- Stanford Olsen, tenor (1986)
- Deidra Palmour, mezzo-soprano (1986)
- Michael Sylvester, tenor (1986)
- Ned Barth, baritone (1987)
- Mary Burt, mezzo-soprano (1987)
- Deborah Lynn Cole, soprano (1987)
- Janet Folta, soprano (1987)
- Amanda Halgrimson, soprano (1987)
- Nikki Li Hartliep, soprano (1987)
- Frederic Kalt, tenor (1987)
- Mi-Hae Park, soprano (1987)
- Celeste Tavera, soprano (1987)
- Steven Tharp, tenor (1987)
- Blythe Walker, soprano (1987)
- Elizabeth Carter, soprano (1988)
- Richard Drews, tenor (1988)
- Renée Fleming, soprano (1988)
- Haijing Fu, baritone (1988)
- Susan Graham, mezzo-soprano (1988)
- Ben Heppner, tenor (1988)
- Wendy Hoffman, mezzo-soprano (1988)
- Carolyn James, soprano (1988)
- Lynda Keith, soprano (1988)
- Heidi Grant Murphy, soprano (1988)
- LeRoy Villanueva, baritone (1988)
- Christine Brewer, soprano (1989)
- Dong-Jian Gong, bass (1989)
- Dominique Labelle, soprano (1989)
- Ning Liang, mezzo-soprano (1989)
- Mary Mills, soprano (1989)
- Mark Oswald, baritone (1989)
- Kevin Short, bass-baritone (1989)
- Tichina Vaughn, mezzo-soprano (1989)
- Rosa Vento, soprano (1989)
- Verónica Villarroel, soprano (1989)

=== 1990s ===
- Jeanne-Michelle Charbonnet, soprano (1990)
- Steven Combs, baritone (1990)
- Catherine Cook, mezzo-soprano (1990)
- Adrienne Dugger, soprano (1990)
- Clare Mueller, soprano (1990)
- Susan Owen, soprano (1990)
- Phyllis Pancella, mezzo-soprano (1990)
- Kitt Reuter-Foss, mezzo-soprano (1990)
- Rebecca Russell, mezzo-soprano (1990)
- Young-Ok Shin, soprano (1990)
- Roy Cornelius Smith, tenor (1990)
- Brian Asawa, countertenor (1991)
- Demareus Cooper, soprano (1991)
- Elizabeth Futral, soprano (1991)
- Paul Groves, tenor (1991)
- Derrick Lawrence, bass-baritone (1991)
- Hong-Shen Li, tenor (1991)
- Kenneth Tarver, tenor (1991)
- Yalun Zhang, baritone (1991)
- Youmi Cho, soprano (1992)
- Michelle DeYoung, mezzo-soprano (1992)
- Yvonne Gonzales, soprano (1992)
- Clare Gormley, soprano (1992)
- Michaela Gurevich, soprano (1992)
- Marie Plette, soprano (1992)
- Christopher Schaldenbrand, baritone (1992)
- Tony Stevenson, tenor (1992)
- Seung Won Choi, tenor (1993)
- Margaret Lattimore, mezzo-soprano (1993)
- Ray M. Wade, tenor (1993)
- Kathryn Krasovec, mezzo-soprano (1993)
- Emily Ann Pulley, soprano (1993)
- Ainhoa Arteta, soprano (1993)
- Elizabeth Bishop, mezzo-soprano (1993)
- Dennis McNeil, tenor (1993)
- Norah Amsellem, soprano (1994)
- John Robert Autry, baritone (1994)
- Stephanie Blythe, mezzo-soprano (1994)
- Sheryl H. Cohen, soprano (1994)
- Nathan Gunn, baritone (1994)
- Olga Makarina, soprano (1994)
- Mark Edward McCrory, bass-baritone (1994)
- John J. Osborn, tenor (1994)
- Svetlana Serdar, mezzo-soprano (1994)
- Daniel Sumegi, bass-baritone (1994)
- Michael Chioldi, baritone (1995)
- Robert Crowe, countertenor (1995)
- Amelia Farrugia, soprano (1995)
- Anita Johnson, soprano (1995)
- Sujung Kim, soprano (1995)
- Aline Kutan, soprano (1995)
- Kelley Nassief, soprano (1995)
- Sondra Radvanovsky, soprano (1995)
- Gregory J. Turay, III, tenor (1995)
- Jon Villars, tenor (1995)
- Leah Creek, mezzo-soprano (1996)
- Tamara Lynn Hummel, soprano (1996)
- Daniele LeBlanc, mezzo-soprano (1996)
- Lester Lynch, baritone (1996)
- Elizabeth Norman, soprano (1996)
- Eric Owens, bass-baritone (1996)
- Jami Rogers, soprano (1996)
- Seo Jung-hack, baritone (1996)
- Lynette Tapia, soprano (1996)
- Isabel Bayrakdarian, soprano (1997)
- Angela Brown, soprano (1997)
- Alexandra Deshorties, soprano (1997)
- Karen Henrikson, soprano (1997)
- Sandra Yvonne Lopez, soprano (1997)
- Mary Petro, soprano (1997)
- Susan Tilbury, soprano (1997)
- Andrea Trebnik, mezzo-soprano (1997)
- Mark Uhlemann, bass-baritone (1997)
- Jennifer Welch, soprano (1997)
- Eric Cutler, tenor (1998)
- Philip Horst, bass-baritone (1998)
- Kyle Ketelsen, bass-baritone (1998)
- Mariateresa Magisano, mezzo-soprano (1998)
- Keith Phares, baritone (1998)
- Jane Shivick, soprano (1998)
- Indra Thomas, soprano (1998)
- David Walker, countertenor (1998)
- Yuan Chenye, baritone (1998)
- Maria Zifchak, mezzo-soprano (1998)
- Kelly Kaduce, soprano (1999)
- Meagan Miller, soprano (1999)
- Jossie Pérez, mezzo-soprano (1999)
- Barbara Quintiliani, soprano (1999)
- Stacey Rishoi, mezzo-soprano (1999)

=== 2000s ===
- Elizabeth Batton, mezzo-soprano (2000)
- Esther Heideman, soprano (2000)
- Lindsay Killian, soprano (2000)
- Latonia Moore, soprano (2000)
- Todd Wilander, tenor (2000)
- Lawrence Brownlee, tenor (2001)
- Melissa Citro, soprano (2001)
- Rachelle Durkin, soprano (2001)
- Jesús Garcia, tenor (2001)
- Kristine Winkler, soprano (2001)
- Carolyn Betty, soprano (2002)
- Philippe Castagner, tenor (2002)
- Twyla Robinson, soprano (2002)
- James Valenti, tenor (2002)
- Alyson Cambridge, soprano (2003)
- Michael Maniaci, male soprano (2003)
- Christina Pier, soprano (2003)
- Christian Van Horn, bass-baritone (2003)
- Meredith Arwady, contralto (2004)
- Claudia Huckle, mezzo-soprano (2004)
- Laquita Mitchell, soprano (2004)
- Jordan Bisch, bass (2005)
- Lisette Oropesa, soprano (2005)
- Susanna Phillips, soprano (2005)
- Rodell Aure Rosel, tenor (2005)
- Paul Corona, bass (2006)
- Holli Harrison, soprano (2006)
- Katherine Jolly, soprano (2006)
- Marjorie Owens, soprano (2006)
- Donovan Singletary, bass-baritone (2006)
- Jamie Barton, mezzo-soprano (2007)
- Michael Fabiano, tenor (2007)
- Angela Meade, soprano (2007)
- Alek Shrader, tenor (2007)
- Ryan Smith, tenor (2007)
- Amber Wagner, soprano (2007)
- René Barbera, tenor (2008)
- Jennifer Johnson Cano, mezzo-soprano (2008)
- Daveda Karanas, mezzo-soprano (2008)
- Simone Osborne, soprano (2008)
- Edward Parks, baritone (2008)
- Paul Appleby, tenor (2009)
- Anthony Roth Costanzo, countertenor (2009)
- Sung Eun Lee, tenor (2009)
- Nadine Sierra, soprano (2009)

=== 2010s ===
- Leah Crocetto, soprano (2010)
- Lori Guilbeau, soprano (2010)
- Elliot Madore, baritone (2010)
- Nathaniel Peake, tenor (2010)
- Rachel Willis-Sørensen, soprano (2010)
- Joseph Barron, bass-baritone (2011)
- Ryan Speedo Green, bass-baritone (2011)
- Michelle Johnson, soprano (2011)
- Joseph Lim, baritone (2011)
- Philippe Sly, bass-baritone (2011)
- Janai Brugger, soprano (2012)
- Anthony Clark Evans, baritone (2012)
- Matthew Grills, tenor (2012)
- Margaret Mezzacappa, mezzo-soprano (2012)
- Andrey Nemzer, countertenor (2012)
- Michael Brandenburg, tenor (2013)
- Brandon Cedel, bass-baritone (2013)
- Sydney Mancasola, soprano (2013)
- Musa Ngqungwana, bass-baritone (2013)
- Rebecca Pedersen, soprano (2013)
- Thomas Richards, bass-baritone (2013)
- Julie Adams, soprano (2014)
- Patrick Guetti, bass (2014)
- Ao Li, bass-baritone (2014)
- Yi Li, tenor (2014)
- Amanda Woodbury, soprano (2014)
- Nicholas Brownlee, bass-baritone (2015)
- Marina Costa-Jackson, soprano (2015)
- Joseph Dennis, tenor (2015)
- Reginald Smith Jr., baritone (2015)
- Virginie Verrez, mezzo-soprano (2015)
- Emily D'Angelo, mezzo-soprano (2016)
- Yelena Dyachek, soprano (2016)
- Sol Jin, baritone (2016)
- Jakub Józef Orliński, countertenor (2016)
- Sean Michael Plumb, baritone (2016)
- Kirsten MacKinnon, soprano (2017)
- Vanessa Vasquez, soprano (2017)
- Richard Smagur, tenor (2017)
- Samantha Hankey, mezzo-soprano (2017)
- Aryeh Nussbaum Cohen, countertenor (2017)
- Kyle van Schoonhoven, tenor (2017)
- Ashley Dixon, mezzo-soprano (2018)
- Jessica Faselt, soprano (2018)
- Madison Leonard, soprano (2018)
- Carlos Enrique Santelli, tenor (2018)
- Hongni Wu, mezzo-soprano (2018)
- Miles Mykkanen, tenor (2019)
- William Guanbo Su, bass (2019)
- Elena Villalón, soprano (2019)
- Thomas Glass, baritone (2019)
- Michaela Wolz, mezzo-soprano (2019)

=== 2020s ===
- Gabrielle Beteag, mezzo-soprano (2020)
- Blake Denson, baritone (2020)
- Jonah Hoskins, tenor (2020)
- Alexandria Shiner, soprano (2020)
- Denis Vélez, soprano (2020)
- Duke Kim, tenor (2021)
- Kim Hyo-young, soprano (2021)
- Raven McMillon, soprano (2021)
- Emily Sierra, mezzo-soprano (2021)
- Emily Treigle, mezzo-soprano (2021)
- Le Bu, bass-baritone (2022)
- Matthew Cairns, tenor (2022)
- Alexandra Razskazoff, soprano (2022)
- Julie Roset, soprano (2022)
- Anne Marie Stanley, mezzo-soprano (2022)
- Esther Tonea, soprano (2022)
- Anthony León, tenor (2023)
- Natalie Lewis, mezzo-soprano (2023)
- Teresa Perrotta, soprano (2023)
- Sarah Saturnino, mezzo-soprano (2023)
- Christian Simmons, bass-baritone (2023)
- Meredith Wohlgemuth, soprano (2023)
- Daniel Espinal, tenor (2024)
- Lydia Grindatto, soprano (2024)
- Navasard Hakobyan, baritone (2024)
- Meridian Prall, mezzo-soprano (2024)
- Emily Richter, soprano (2024)
- Sadie Cheslak, mezzo-soprano (2025)
- Alissa Goretsky, soprano (2025)
- Emma Marhefka, soprano (2025)
- Michelle Mariposa, mezzo-soprano (2025)
- Luke Sutliff, baritone (2025)
- Shannon Crowley, soprano (2026)
- Elizabeth Hanje, soprano (2026)
- Song Hee Lee, soprano (2026)
- Gabriel Natal-Báez, baritone (2026)
- Robert Wente, baritone (2026)
- Anna Thompson, soprano (2026)
