= Kirsten MacKinnon =

Canadian operatic soprano

- Born: Vancouver, British Columbia, Canada
- Education: Curtis Institute of Music
- Occupation: Operatic soprano
- Organizations: Oper Frankfurt
- Awards: Metropolitan Opera National Council Auditions

Kirsten MacKinnon is a Canadian operatic soprano. A winner of the Metropolitan Opera National Council Auditions in 2017, she has appeared internationally.

She grew up in Vancouver, and studied voice at the Curtis Institute of Music in Philadelphia. At the Philadelphia Opera, she performed the roles of Micaëla in Bizet's Carmen and the Countess Madeleine in Capriccio by Richard Strauss. She was Pamina in Mozart's Die Zauberflöte) for the Canadian Opera Company, and the Countess in his Le nozze di Figaro with the Garsington Opera. Her roles have included Elektra in Mozart's Idomeneo, the title role of Tchaikovsky's Iolanta, Mimì in Puccini's La bohème, and the title role in Janáček's The Cunning Little Vixen.

In Europe, she appeared at the Glyndebourne Festival as Fiordiligi in Mozart's Così fan tutte in 2017, staged by Nicholas Hytner. A reviewer of The Guardian described her as "a vocal star" in an "uncommonly well balanced" quartet of lovers, offering "the high notes and the low notes for Fiordiligi and everything in between". She was Helena in Britten's A Midsummer Night's Dream. In February 2018, she made her debut at the Oper Frankfurt, where she is engaged as a member from the 2018/19 season, as Inès in a new production of Meyerbeer's L'Africaine – Vasco da Gama at the Oper Frankfurt, conducted by Antonello Manacorda, alongside Claudia Mahnke and Michael Spyres in the title roles. The opera is staged as a space mission, and she was described as dramatic and of emotional intensity.

MacKinnon has performed in concert with the Chamber Orchestra of Philadelphia, the Bavarian Radio Orchestra, and the Vancouver Symphony Orchestra, among others.
