= Junetta Jones =

American singer

Junetta Jones (March 12, 1936 - February 17, 2015) was an American operatic soprano. A Baltimore native, she was a graduate of Frederick Douglass Senior High School. After spending a year at Morgan State College(now University), she was awarded a three-year scholarship to the Peabody Conservatory where she earned a diploma in 1961. She then pursued further studies at the New England Conservatory where she earned a Master of Music in 1963. She studied at the Tanglewood Music Center in the summer of 1961. In 1963 she won the Metropolitan Opera National Council Auditions. She made her debut at the Metropolitan Opera on Halloween of 1963 as the Celestial Voice in Giuseppe Verdi's Don Carlos with Richard Tucker in the title role. She sang two seasons at the Met, with other roles including the 1st Genie in The Magic Flute, the Page in Rigoletto, and Barbarina in The Marriage of Figaro. From 1965 to 1969 she performed with major opera houses in Europe. She worked for 20 years on the advisory committee for art and culture for the city of Baltimore. She died on February 17, 2015, in Davidsonville, Maryland.
