= Heidi Grant Murphy =

American operatic soprano and vocal coach

- Born: Heidi Grant; 1965 (age 60–61); Bellingham, Washington, U.S.
- Education: Jacobs School of Music
- Occupations: Operatic soprano; Academic teacher
- Organizations: Metropolitan Opera; Jacobs School of Music
- Spouse: Kevin Murphy
- Awards: Metropolitan Opera National Council Auditions

Heidi Grant Murphy (born 1965) is an American operatic soprano and academic voice teacher. A member of the Metropolitan Opera since 1989, she appeared at international opera houses, and made recordings. She has been a voice teacher at the Jacobs School of Music from 2011.

== Life ==
Heidi Grant was born in Bellingham, Washington. She began her music education at Western Washington University and continued at the Jacobs School of Music of Indiana University Bloomington. During her graduate studies, she became a winner of the Metropolitan Opera National Council Auditions and was hired by James Levine as a participant in the Metropolitan Opera's Lindemann Young Artist Development Program.

She became a member of the Metropolitan Opera ensemble in 1989, where she has given over 200 performances; her roles included Mozart's Servilia in La clemenza di Tito, Susanna in Le nozze di Figaro and Pamina in Die Zauberflöte. She has performed at major opera houses such as the Oper Frankfurt, De Nederlandse Opera, at Théâtre Royal de la Monnaie and the Santa Fe Opera. She has worked with major orchestras in the United States and abroad, including the Vienna Philharmonic conducted by Herbert Blomstedt. Conductors also included Christoph Eschenbach, Lorin Maazel, Kurt Masur, Kent Nagano, Seiji Ozawa, Robert Shaw, Christian Thielemann, Edo de Waart, David Zinman, Pinchas Zukerman. Her repertoire also includes Drusilla in Monteverdi's L'incoronazione di Poppea, Mozart's Celia in Lucio Silla, Ilia in Idomeneo and Ismene in Mitridate, re di Ponto, Sister Constance in Poulenc's Dialogues des Carmélites and Anne Trulove in Stravinsky's The Rake's Progress.

She recorded Clearings in the Sky, a collection of compositions by Lili Boulanger, a recital collection Twilight and Innocence, and Bach cantatas for Arabesque Records. She recorded operas including Schumann's Paradise and the Peri, Mozart's Idomeneo and Le nozze di Figaro (as Barbarina) for Deutsche Grammophon. She recorded a Grammy-nominated album, Sweeney Todd, for the label of the New York Philharmonic Orchestra.

Since 2011, she has been teaching at the Jacobs School of Music, joining the faculty together with her husband, the pianist Kevin Murphy.

In a 2021 profile in The New York Times of Murphy and her spouse, she was reported having stated that “the instrument in your throat” is not enough, and that the process of becoming a singer “takes work on your psyche, your innermost being.”
