= Wendy Bryn Harmer =

American opera singer

- Born: c. 1980; Roseville, California, U.S.
- Origin: Bountiful, Utah, U.S.
- Genres: Opera
- Occupation: Opera singer
- Instruments: Vocals (dramatic soprano); Flute
- Years active: 2003–present
- Formerly of: Lindemann Young Artist's Program; Merola Opera Program; Gerdine Young Artists’ program

Wendy Bryn Harmer (born c. 1980) is a dramatic soprano, best known for her roles in Richard Wagner's Der Ring des Nibelungen.

== Early life and education ==
Born in Roseville, California, Harmer was raised in Bountiful, Utah, where she sang in the Salt Lake Children's Choir until the age of 17, and also played the flute. After high school, she attended the Boston Conservatory and studied with Sheri Greenawald and attended master classes with soprano Christine Brewer, whose recommendation enabled her to receive a scholarship. She attended the 2002 and 2003 summer programs of the Music Academy of the West in Montecito, whose founder, Marilyn Horne, "took me under her wing."

== Career ==
In 2003, she joined the Gerdine Young Artists’ program at the Opera Theatre of Saint Louis. In 2004 she participated in a nine-artist master class at the Villecroze Music Academy on the French Côte d’Azur, here first feeling a special attraction to the work of Wagner. This led to her participation in the San Francisco Opera’s Merola summer program in 2004 and then the Metropolitan Opera's Lindemann Young Artist's Program, the start of her long association with the Met.

At the Met, Harmer has appeared in Le nozze di Figaro, War and Peace, Khovanshchina, Parsifal, Das Rheingold, Die Walküre, Die ägyptische Helena, and Jenufa; and in the Met's high-definition video recordings of the Ring Cycle and The Magic Flute. Her engagements with other companies have included several roles in the Seattle Opera’s Ring Cycle, her debut at Houston Grand Opera as Rosalinde in Die Fledermaus, Eglantine in Euryanthe at the Bard Music Festival, Die Walküre at the San Francisco Opera, Glauce in Medea at the Glimmerglass Festival, Wanda in La Grande-Duchesse de Gérolstein and Vitellia in La Clemenza di Tito at Opera Boston, Adalgisa in Norma at the Palm Beach Opera, and Mimi in La Bohéme at the Utah Opera Festival.

In the Ring Cycle, Harmer's frequent roles are Freia in Das Rheingold, Ortlinde in Die Walküre, and Third Norn or Gutrune in Götterdämmerung.
