= Palm Beach Opera =

Palm Beach Opera, a professional opera company in West Palm Beach, Florida, performing at the Kravis Center for the Performing Arts as well as other locations throughout South Florida, was founded in 1961 as "Civic Opera of the Palm Beaches". Over its history, the company has presented a season of fully staged operas ranging from a single production in early years to four beginning in the mid-1990s.

In 2013, the company produced its first large-scale free outdoor concert, Opera @ The Waterfront. With nearly 100 performers on stage, Opera @ The Waterfront is the largest outdoor classical music event in Palm Beach County. In the 2014/2015 season, Palm Beach Opera is presenting its first world premiere, "Enemies, A Love Story" (music by Ben Moore, libretto by Nahma Sandrow, based on the book Enemies, A Love Story by Isaac Bashevis Singer. Other productions being presented in the 2014/2015 season are Giacomo Puccini's La bohème and Gaetano Donizetti's La fille du régiment (The Daughter of the Regiment).

In the 1980s, the company was led by impresario Joseph H. Conlin. Anton Guadagno served as the company's director from 1984 to 2002.
