= Eve Queler =

American conductor (born 1931)

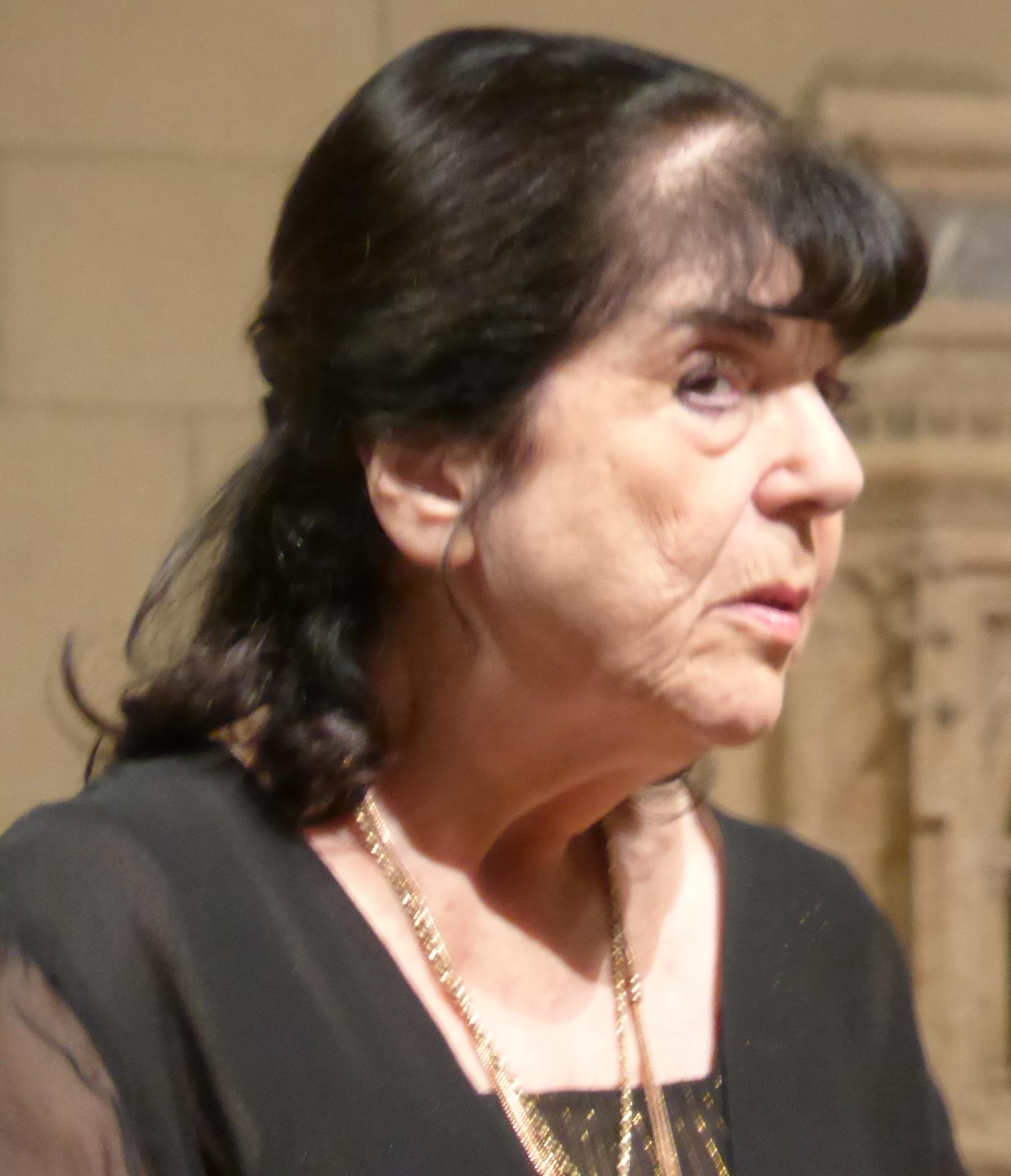
Eve Queler, 2015

Eve Queler (born January 11, 1931) is an American conductor and the emerita Artistic Director of the Opera Orchestra of New York (OONY). She founded the OONY in 1971, after having worked on the staff of the Metropolitan Opera and the New York City Opera. She is notable for her advocacy for, and conducting of, lesser known and less-frequently performed operas, such as Rienzi and Jenůfa.

Born Eve Rabin in New York City, Queler attended The High School of Music & Art, graduating in 1948. She then matriculated in the Mannes School of Music, where she studied piano and conducting. A Martha Baird Rockefeller Fund grant enabled her to pursue further studies in conducting with Joseph Rosenstock and accompaniment with Paul Ulanowsky and Paul Berl. She also participated in master classes with Walter Susskind and Leonard Slatkin in St. Louis and Igor Markevich and Herbert Blomstedt in Europe.

Although primarily dedicated to the OONY, she has appeared as a guest conductor with numerous opera companies and orchestras internationally, including the Mariinsky Theatre, Opera Australia, the Hamburg State Opera, the National Theatre in Prague, the Frankfurt Opera, the Philadelphia Orchestra, the Montreal Symphony Orchestra, the Cleveland Orchestra, the Edmonton Symphony Orchestra, and the Honolulu Symphony Orchestra among others.

Eve Queler is the recipient of a 2010 National Endowment for the Arts Opera Honors Award. In 2017, New Amsterdam Opera presented Ma. Queler with its first-ever Pathfinder Award.

== Personal life ==
Her husband was Stanley Queler, a lawyer, who died on January 30, 2013, at age 83.
