= List of performers at the Metropolitan Opera =

This is a list of the singers, conductors, and dancers who have appeared in at least 100 performances at the Metropolitan Opera, last updated May 3, 2026. Performers are listed by the number of the performances they have appeared in as found at the Metropolitan Opera Archives. The number of performances and last performance date listed may not be current as numbers may have changed with later performances.

Performer	Performances	Category	First performance	Last performance
Charles Anthony	2928	tenor	6 March 1954	28 January 2010
James Levine	2591	conductor	5 June 1971	2 December 2017
George Cehanovsky	2395	baritone	13 November 1926	16 April 1966
Angelo Badà	2170	tenor	16 November 1908	9 April 1938
Paul Franke	1980	tenor	1 December 1948	16 April 1987
James Courtney	1953	bass-baritone	29 November 1979	4 January 2020
Louis D'Angelo	1881	baritone	13 November 1917	15 February 1948
Andrea Velis	1693	tenor	23 October 1961	24 February 1994
Paul Plishka	1672	bass	27 June 1967	10 March 2018
Paolo Ananian	1639	bass	14 November 1908	12 April 1935
Giordano Paltrinieri	1618	tenor	15 November 1918	23 April 1940
Vincenzo Reschiglian	1577	baritone	8 November 1909	7 May 1929
Alessio De Paolis	1555	tenor	3 December 1938	5 March 1964
Thelma Votipka	1422	soprano	16 December 1935	16 April 1966
Russell Christopher	1410	baritone	29 March 1963	20 April 1991
Clifford Harvuot	1297	baritone	15 March 1942	31 December 1975
Antonio Scotti	1213	baritone	15 November 1899	20 January 1933
Pietro Audisio	1193	tenor	9 November 1909	3 May 1924
Robert Nagy	1189	tenor	2 November 1957	16 April 1988
Tony Stevenson	1128	tenor	5 April 1992	28 April 2026
Louis Sgarro	1107	bass	16 November 1954	8 March 1975
Léon Rothier	1105	bass	10 December 1910	25 February 1939
Gene Boucher	1096	baritone	23 March 1964	17 March 1984
Artur Bodanzky	1094	conductor	18 November 1915	23 May 1939
Gabor Carelli	1080	tenor	17 November 1951	22 October 1983
Albert Reiss	1075	tenor	12 October 1901	14 April 1919
Mathilde Bauermeister	1062	soprano	11 November 1891	17 March 1906
James Morris	1027	bass-baritone	7 January 1971	24 October 2021
John Macurdy	1001	bass	8 December 1962	6 May 2000
Bernard Fitch	994	tenor	20 February 1989	18 March 2016
Robert Goodloe	984	baritone	23 March 1964	8 June 1982
Lorenzo Alvary	983	bass	26 November 1942	22 October 1983
Osie Hawkins	963	baritone	22 January 1942	8 February 1986
Fausto Cleva	961	conductor	4 December 1938	8 June 1971
Adamo Didur	933	bass	14 November 1908	26 February 1933
Loretta Di Franco	929	soprano	16 January 1961	21 April 1995
Giovanni Martinelli	927	tenor	18 November 1913	20 November 1963
Giuseppe De Luca	927	baritone	25 November 1915	24 March 1946
Norman Scott	927	bass	15 November 1951	29 June 1968
Millo Picco	921	baritone	7 April 1919	19 February 1936
Calvin Marsh	911	baritone	11 November 1954	22 August 1967
Andrij Dobriansky	905	bass	11 February 1970	6 January 1996
Marie Mattfeld	900	mezzo-soprano	29 April 1901	4 March 1927
Ezio Pinza	879	bass	1 November 1926	14 May 1948
Anthony Laciura	875	tenor	20 September 1982	12 April 2008
Plácido Domingo	874	tenor	9 August 1966	27 April 2019
Jerome Hines	869	bass	21 November 1946	24 January 1987
Enrico Caruso	863	tenor	23 November 1903	24 December 1920
Arnold Gabor	803	baritone	9 November 1923	17 March 1941
Richard Vernon	796	bass	20 March 1977	28 November 2006
Nico Castel	793	tenor	30 March 1970	18 October 1997
Robert Merrill	789	baritone	15 December 1945	22 October 1983
Jean Kraft	784	mezzo-soprano	7 February 1970	5 April 1989
Adolph Mühlmann	776	baritone	7 November 1898	6 May 1910
Gennaro Papi	775	conductor	24 November 1912	6 May 1941
Henriette Wakefield	772	mezzo-soprano	18 January 1907	14 March 1935
Alfred Hertz	768	conductor	28 November 1902	4 June 1915
Bernard Bégué	767	baritone	24 November 1902	27 April 1917
Carlotta Ordassy	761	soprano	22 January 1957	11 June 1977
Minnie Egener	752	soprano	24 December 1903	15 December 1932
Eugène Dufriche	749	baritone	29 November 1893	29 April 1908
Lucine Amara	748	soprano	6 November 1950	7 January 1991
Robert Schmorr	747	tenor	30 July 1965	12 January 1978
Richard Tucker	738	tenor	25 January 1945	3 December 1974
Pompilio Malatesta	736	bass	25 November 1915	20 February 1939
Louise Homer	734	mezzo-soprano	14 November 1900	28 November 1929
Shirley Love	731	mezzo-soprano	30 November 1963	27 January 1984
Fernando Corena	723	bass	6 February 1954	30 December 1978
Nicola Moscona	719	bass	13 December 1937	9 December 1961
Max Altglass	714	tenor	6 November 1924	19 February 1940
Lawrence Davidson	713	bass	15 November 1947	8 February 1966
Rosalind Elias	687	mezzo-soprano	23 February 1954	1 November 1996
Eduardo Valdes	686	tenor	7 February 1994	4 January 2022
Tullio Serafin	684	conductor	3 November 1924	12 April 1934
Frank Guarrera	680	baritone	14 December 1948	8 May 1976
Edouard de Reszke	678	bass	9 November 1891	27 April 1903
Geraldine Farrar	672	soprano	26 November 1906	22 April 1922
Gerhard Pechner	661	bass	27 November 1941	10 December 1966
Julien Robbins	660	bass	29 October 1979	28 December 2013
Leonard Warren	657	baritone	27 November 1938	4 March 1960
Sherrill Milnes	653	baritone	22 December 1965	22 March 1997
Mignon Dunn	652	mezzo-soprano	29 October 1958	27 January 1994
Cornell MacNeil	642	baritone	21 March 1959	5 December 1987
Pasquale Amato	633	baritone	20 November 1908	26 February 1933
Lucrezia Bori	628	soprano	9 June 1910	2 April 1936
Otto Goritz	625	baritone	24 December 1903	7 April 1917
Lenora Sparkes	624	soprano	16 November 1908	18 April 1926
Pol Plançon	613	bass	29 November 1893	27 April 1908
Dwayne Croft	610	baritone	18 April 1990	10 April 2026
Lawrence Tibbett	602	baritone	24 November 1923	24 March 1950
James McCracken	597	tenor	21 November 1953	17 June 1986
Margaret Roggero	596	mezzo-soprano	11 November 1950	22 October 1983
Batyah Godfrey Ben-David	595	mezzo-soprano	17 February 1969	16 April 1988
Morley Meredith	593	baritone	3 January 1962	18 April 1992
Rosina Galli	593	dancer	19 November 1914	18 February 1935
James Wolfe	592	bass	7 November 1923	23 December 1939
Richard Bernstein	588	bass-baritone	7 October 1995	28 April 2026
Jane Shaulis	567	mezzo-soprano	28 September 1991	15 December 2018
Marion Telva	567	mezzo-soprano	31 December 1920	26 February 1933
Maxine Stellman	565	soprano	22 May 1936	8 April 1950
Lucielle Browning	558	mezzo-soprano	15 May 1936	11 May 1951
Mario Sereni	553	baritone	9 November 1957	10 November 1984
Norman Cordon	551	bass	13 May 1936	18 May 1946
Julius Bayer	549	tenor	24 December 1903	21 April 1917
Richard Best	545	bass	2 April 1969	7 June 1978
Gil Wechsler	536	lighting designer	18 January 1977	28 February 2024
Giuseppe Bonfiglio	534	dancer	12 March 1908	31 March 1935
Louis Hasselmans	534	conductor	20 January 1922	4 April 1936
Giulio Rossi	532	bass	16 November 1908	12 April 1919
Luigi Mancinelli	531	conductor	27 November 1893	14 April 1903
Ezio Flagello	528	bass	9 November 1957	17 December 1984
Giorgio Tozzi	528	bass	9 March 1955	21 May 1975
John Brownlee	527	baritone	17 February 1937	20 November 1963
Betsy Norden	523	soprano	27 January 1972	10 January 1992
Lauritz Melchior	519	tenor	17 February 1926	2 February 1950
Marco Armiliato	515	conductor	16 June 1998	24 January 2026
Roberta Peters	515	soprano	17 November 1950	25 April 1985
Beniamino Gigli	510	tenor	26 November 1920	8 February 1939
Peter Sliker	509	bass	29 November 1961	16 December 1989
John Darrenkamp	506	baritone	24 September 1979	21 April 1995
Isola Jones	505	mezzo-soprano	15 October 1977	23 February 1991
Wendy White	505	mezzo-soprano	9 April 1978	17 December 2011
Jacques Bars	502	tenor	18 November 1896	26 April 1907
Johanna Gadski	496	soprano	11 December 1898	28 April 1917
Giuseppe Campanari	495	baritone	30 November 1894	13 April 1912
Cesare Siepi	491	bass	6 November 1950	19 April 1973
Wilfred Pelletier	491	conductor	16 December 1917	15 May 1950
Maria Zifchak	489	mezzo-soprano	5 April 1998	9 March 2020
Vincenzo Bellezza	486	conductor	17 March 1918	29 March 1935
Patrick Carfizzi	484	bass-baritone	24 December 1999	21 February 2026
Erich Leinsdorf	483	conductor	21 January 1938	5 March 1983
Anton Seidl	482	conductor	23 November 1885	20 April 1897
Robert Blass	481	bass	13 November 1900	21 April 1922
Roberto Moranzoni	481	conductor	12 November 1917	3 May 1924
Arturo Toscanini	480	conductor	16 November 1908	14 April 1915
Mark Schowalter	479	tenor	19 February 1999	1 January 2022
Andrés De Segurola	478	bass	10 October 1901	8 April 1920
Kathleen Howard	477	mezzo-soprano	14 November 1916	12 April 1928
Marcella Sembrich	468	soprano	24 October 1883	26 February 1933
Ariel Bybee	466	mezzo-soprano	31 October 1977	30 June 1995
Matthew Polenzani	465	tenor	19 December 1997	28 March 2026
Marcia Baldwin	463	mezzo-soprano	17 October 1963	24 February 1977
Emery Darcy	460	tenor	6 December 1940	23 May 1953
Lodovico Oliviero	457	tenor	11 May 1936	23 February 1948
Wilfred Engelman	457	baritone	11 May 1936	16 April 1943
Scott Scully	456	tenor	12 November 2009	28 March 2026
Friedrich Schorr	455	baritone	14 February 1924	2 March 1943
Frank Valentino	454	baritone	9 December 1940	10 April 1961
Zinka Milanov	450	soprano	17 December 1937	22 October 1983
Armand Tokatyan	449	tenor	19 November 1922	7 March 1946
Emanuel List	449	bass	27 December 1933	1 April 1950
Rita Fornia	449	soprano	6 December 1907	7 April 1922
Paul Corona	448	bass	26 March 2006	10 April 2026
Edmond Karlsrud	447	bass	17 January 1969	17 June 1977
Edward Ghazal	447	bass	25 March 1959	28 April 1990
William Gustafson	445	bass	23 November 1920	2 January 1931
Philip Cokorinos	443	bass	14 April 1985	9 June 2023
Irra Petina	442	mezzo-soprano	29 December 1933	24 March 1950
Emma Eames	439	soprano	9 November 1891	15 February 1909
Paul De Paola	439	bass	26 December 1960	23 November 1993
Philip Booth	439	bass	1 November 1970	21 December 1995
Joseph Urban	438	scenic designer	17 November 1917	16 March 1962
Linda Gelinas	438	dancer	3 December 1981	28 December 2021
Max Bloch	435	tenor	20 November 1914	15 April 1930
Jane Bunnell	434	mezzo-soprano	8 April 1979	27 April 2019
Licia Albanese	430	soprano	9 February 1940	4 March 1979
Eleanor Steber	428	soprano	7 December 1940	22 October 1983
Jeffrey Wells	428	bass	26 September 1988	1 December 2015
Roberto Vanni	428	tenor	21 November 1894	27 April 1903
Bella Alten	426	soprano	30 November 1904	21 April 1914
Giuseppe Danise	425	baritone	17 November 1920	16 January 1932
Ina Bourskaya	423	mezzo-soprano	2 March 1923	10 April 1937
John Baker	423	baritone	14 March 1943	2 March 1951
Charles Kullman	421	tenor	19 December 1935	3 December 1960
Clarence Whitehill	420	baritone	15 November 1909	9 April 1932
Salvatore Baccaloni	416	bass	3 December 1940	8 August 1965
Bonaldo Giaiotti	414	bass	24 October 1960	17 November 1989
Philine Falco	414	soprano	4 November 1927	19 April 1935
Karin Branzell	412	mezzo-soprano	6 February 1924	20 November 1963
Rosa Ponselle	411	soprano	15 November 1918	17 April 1937
Enrico Bevignani	410	conductor	29 November 1893	25 April 1900
Lodovico Viviani	410	bass	16 November 1891	2 March 1905
Marcel Journet	410	bass	9 November 1900	5 February 1908
José Mardones	409	bass	12 November 1917	6 May 1926
Helen Vanni	402	mezzo-soprano	9 November 1956	26 March 1973
Martha Lipton	402	mezzo-soprano	27 November 1944	22 October 1983
Nello Santi	401	conductor	25 January 1962	1 July 2000
Editha Fleischer	400	soprano	6 November 1926	21 March 1936
Justino Díaz	400	bass	29 March 1963	4 November 1994
Theodor Uppman	399	baritone	27 November 1953	22 October 1983
Gustav Schützendorf	397	baritone	17 November 1922	19 April 1935
Andreas Dippel	394	tenor	26 November 1890	13 April 1908
Lillian Nordica	394	soprano	18 December 1891	22 December 1909
Edyta Kulczak	388	mezzo-soprano	25 February 2003	10 April 2026
Hei-Kyung Hong	386	soprano	21 March 1982	20 April 2022
Dorothea Flexer	385	mezzo-soprano	5 March 1926	21 March 1936
George Meader	385	tenor	19 November 1921	12 April 1935
Teresa Stratas	385	soprano	20 March 1959	9 December 1995
Carl Schlegel	383	baritone	19 November 1913	9 April 1926
Patricia Heyes	383	dancer	7 March 1962	13 March 1981
Elisabeth Rethberg	381	soprano	22 November 1922	6 March 1942
Margarete Matzenauer	380	mezzo-soprano	13 November 1911	12 February 1930
John Alexander	379	tenor	19 December 1961	5 October 1987
Luciano Pavarotti	379	tenor	23 November 1968	13 March 2004
Emil Fischer	376	bass	23 November 1885	15 March 1907
Margaret Harshaw	376	mezzo-soprano, soprano	15 March 1942	10 March 1964
Lou Marcella	375	tenor	2 November 1958	5 October 1982
David Crawford	374	bass-baritone	22 October 2007	18 October 2025
John Cheek	373	bass	6 June 1977	12 May 2012
Frances Alda	369	soprano	7 December 1908	28 December 1929
Franco Corelli	369	tenor	27 January 1961	28 June 1975
Jean Madeira	369	mezzo-soprano	2 December 1948	27 February 1971
Nicolai Gedda	367	tenor	1 November 1957	11 November 1983
William Walker	365	baritone	23 March 1962	10 June 1978
Alfio Tedesco	363	tenor	2 November 1926	28 March 1935
Frederick Jagel	360	tenor	8 November 1927	20 November 1963
Helen Olheim	360	mezzo-soprano	19 December 1935	8 March 1944
Blanche Thebom	357	mezzo-soprano	28 November 1944	6 March 1967
Grace Anthony	355	soprano	16 November 1921	26 February 1933
Florence Easton	354	soprano	7 December 1917	15 March 1936
Kurt Baum	354	tenor	27 November 1941	16 April 1966
Naomi Marritt	353	dancer	1 November 1963	2 January 1992
Risë Stevens	352	mezzo-soprano	22 November 1938	22 October 1983
Basil Ruysdael	350	bass	18 November 1910	26 April 1918
Kerstin Thorborg	350	mezzo-soprano	21 December 1936	8 February 1950
Leon Varkas	350	dancer	25 November 1941	13 May 1950
Ludwig Burgstaller	347	tenor	19 February 1909	29 April 1951
Ronald Naldi	347	tenor	18 April 1983	31 October 2019
Doris Doe	346	mezzo-soprano	3 February 1932	3 February 1947
Queena Mario	346	soprano	30 November 1922	26 December 1938
Maria Jeritza	345	soprano	19 November 1921	22 February 1951
Olive Fremstad	345	soprano	25 November 1903	23 April 1914
Kurt Adler	342	conductor	26 March 1944	9 July 1972
Thomas Schippers	342	conductor	23 December 1955	3 November 1975
Arthur Thompson	341	baritone	20 February 1973	8 July 1988
Hao Jiang Tian	341	bass	10 October 1991	12 November 2015
Emmy Destinn	340	soprano	16 November 1908	27 December 1920
Jean de Reszke	339	tenor	9 November 1891	29 April 1901
Flora Perini	338	mezzo-soprano	2 December 1915	20 April 1924
Mildred Miller	338	mezzo-soprano	17 November 1951	3 December 1974
Antonio Rinaldini	337	tenor	13 November 1891	24 April 1896
Jan Peerce	337	tenor	29 November 1941	22 June 1968
Juan Pons	337	baritone	4 January 1983	24 October 2007
Ara Berberian	335	bass	21 April 1979	23 January 1997
Dorothee Manski	335	soprano	5 November 1927	23 February 1941
Glenn Bater	335	bass	25 January 1973	9 May 2006
Hertha Glaz	334	mezzo-soprano	25 December 1942	26 May 1956
Thomas Hayward	334	tenor	23 November 1945	29 March 1957
John Gurney	331	bass	12 April 1935	4 May 1945
Marek Windheim	330	tenor	1 November 1928	10 April 1936
Regina Resnik	328	soprano, mezzo-soprano	6 December 1944	22 October 1983
Donald Mahler	326	dancer	16 February 1962	4 March 2013
LeRoy Lehr	326	bass	14 January 1993	15 May 2010
Walter Damrosch	325	conductor	11 February 1885	12 May 1937
Carlo Bergonzi	324	tenor	13 November 1956	27 April 1996
Marie Van Cauteren	320	soprano	10 October 1894	27 April 1903
Samuel Ramey	320	bass	9 April 1972	10 January 2013
Giorgio Polacco	319	conductor	11 November 1912	27 April 1917
Charlotte Ryan	318	soprano	23 November 1922	25 March 1932
Mario Laurenti	318	baritone	6 January 1916	20 February 1922
Fritz Stiedry	316	conductor	15 November 1946	8 April 1958
Phradie Wells	316	soprano	7 November 1923	19 April 1935
Raymonde Delaunois	315	mezzo-soprano	28 November 1914	18 April 1926
Renata Scotto	315	soprano	13 October 1965	17 January 1987
Mary Ellen Pracht	314	soprano	24 November 1961	19 February 1977
Francesco Molinari-Pradelli	312	conductor	7 February 1966	23 June 1973
John Garris	312	tenor	27 February 1942	19 April 1949
John Del Carlo	310	bass-baritone	14 January 1993	19 January 2016
Monna Montes	309	dancer	24 December 1936	4 April 1945
Alfredo Gandolfi	307	baritone	28 October 1929	20 March 1936
Giacomo Lauri-Volpi	307	tenor	26 January 1923	14 March 1933
Anton Van Rooy	306	bass-baritone	14 December 1898	16 April 1908
Antonio De Vaschetti	306	bass	16 November 1891	20 April 1897
Renato Capecchi	305	baritone	24 November 1951	25 June 1994
Ettore Panizza	304	conductor	22 December 1934	11 April 1942
Laurel Hurley	304	soprano	8 February 1955	4 July 1967
Linda Mays	303	soprano	16 February 1974	10 April 2009
Frederica von Stade	301	mezzo-soprano	10 January 1970	14 March 2010
Raymond Michalski	301	bass	29 December 1965	26 April 1976
Leonie Rysanek	300	soprano	5 February 1959	2 January 1996
Lily Pons	300	soprano	3 January 1931	14 December 1960
Rita De Leporte	300	dancer	11 April 1923	9 April 1935
Christopher Job	299	bass-baritone	28 September 2013	4 April 2026
Thelma Altman	299	mezzo-soprano	22 November 1943	15 May 1950
Anna Kaskas	297	mezzo-soprano	13 May 1936	26 April 1946
Arturo Vigna	297	conductor	23 November 1903	27 April 1907
Howard Sayette	297	dancer	24 February 1961	7 June 1972
Michael Best	297	tenor	16 November 1979	6 December 1995
Carlo Rizzi	296	conductor	29 October 1993	28 March 2026
Josephine Jacoby	295	mezzo-soprano	15 October 1899	29 April 1908
John Hanriot	294	tenor	9 November 1977	23 November 2001
Lili Chookasian	291	mezzo-soprano	9 March 1962	17 May 1986
Bradley Garvin	289	bass-baritone	30 September 1993	18 October 2024
Ellen Dalossy	289	soprano	10 December 1920	20 March 1935
Jeongcheol Cha	289	bass-baritone	7 November 2013	10 April 2026
Joann Grillo	289	mezzo-soprano	17 October 1963	15 June 1984
Michael Forest	289	tenor	27 September 1989	26 October 2013
Ivan Allen	288	dancer	18 November 1964	12 January 1978
Yannick Nézet-Séguin	288	conductor	31 December 2009	4 April 2026
Rachel Schuette	287	dancer	16 December 1993	5 April 2018
Sándor Kónya	287	tenor	28 October 1961	12 December 1974
Dorothy Kirsten	286	soprano	1 December 1945	22 October 1983
Heidi Krall	286	soprano	12 December 1953	27 May 1966
Ernestine Schumann-Heink	285	mezzo-soprano	7 November 1898	11 March 1932
Dawn Upshaw	284	soprano	11 October 1984	13 February 2005
Judith Blegen	284	soprano	19 January 1970	21 February 1991
Nedda Casei	283	mezzo-soprano	14 October 1964	20 October 1984
Earle Patriarco	282	baritone	12 January 1996	29 November 2025
Leslie Chabay	282	tenor	13 November 1946	11 May 1951
Alberto Erede	281	conductor	11 November 1950	24 March 1975
Riccardo Martin	281	tenor	20 November 1907	29 November 1917
James Conlon	280	conductor	11 December 1976	29 November 2014
Jon Vickers	280	tenor	17 January 1960	18 April 1987
Louis Quilico	279	baritone	10 February 1972	19 November 1994
Désiré Defrère	278	baritone, opera director	19 November 1914	19 April 1964
Renée Fleming	278	soprano	10 April 1988	31 May 2024
Alma Jean Smith	277	soprano	24 March 1974	18 April 1980
Diane Elias	277	mezzo-soprano	14 October 1996	22 December 2009
James Atherton	277	tenor	17 October 1977	27 September 1985
Giuseppe Bamboschek	276	conductor	16 January 1916	20 November 1963
Vernon Hartman	276	baritone	21 October 1982	1 May 1997
Walter Cassel	276	baritone	6 December 1942	22 October 1983
Antonio Pini-Corsi	275	bass	11 October 1899	22 April 1914
Harry Jones	274	dancer	16 April 1958	5 June 1973
Irene Dalis	274	mezzo-soprano	16 March 1957	25 May 1976
Robert Leonhardt	274	baritone	26 December 1913	13 November 1922
Tatiana Troyanos	274	mezzo-soprano	8 March 1976	1 May 1993
Rudolf Laubenthal	273	tenor	9 November 1923	4 March 1933
Allan Monk	272	baritone	27 March 1976	15 March 1986
Anselmo Colzani	272	baritone	7 April 1960	16 February 1978
Mario Basiola	272	baritone	11 November 1925	27 April 1932
Suzanne Laurence	272	dancer	20 March 1969	19 February 2018
Julius Rudel	270	conductor	7 October 1978	16 September 2007
Renata Tebaldi	270	soprano	31 January 1955	8 January 1973
Christopher Schaldenbrand	268	baritone	5 April 1992	23 April 2011
Raymond Gibbs	268	tenor	11 February 1970	10 January 1981
Craig Montgomery	266	tenor	5 April 2006	28 March 2026
Florence Rudolph	266	dancer	6 February 1919	5 May 1926
Gladys Swarthout	265	mezzo-soprano	29 October 1929	24 March 1951
Lilli Lehmann	265	soprano	25 November 1885	21 April 1899
George London	264	baritone	13 November 1951	10 March 1966
Philip Creech	264	tenor	26 September 1979	22 November 1997
Dolora Zajick	263	mezzo-soprano	8 October 1988	18 January 2019
Emma Calvé	262	soprano	29 November 1893	24 April 1904
Rod MacWherter	262	tenor	17 October 1968	23 June 1973
Thomas Hammons	262	bass-baritone	13 December 1996	22 March 2008
Irene Jessner	261	soprano	21 December 1936	1 February 1952
Karl Böhm	261	conductor	31 October 1957	28 October 1978
Gabriella Tucci	260	soprano	29 October 1960	25 December 1972
Kirsten Flagstad	260	soprano	2 February 1935	1 April 1952
Paul Althouse	260	tenor	23 November 1912	18 February 1940
Barry Morell	259	tenor	1 November 1958	19 February 1979
Diane Kesling	259	mezzo-soprano	5 April 1981	19 January 1991
Stephanie Blythe	255	mezzo-soprano	27 March 1994	13 May 2023
Italo Tajo	254	bass	28 December 1948	20 April 1991
Joseph Rosenstock	254	conductor	30 October 1929	13 February 1969
Michael Arshansky	254	dancer	25 November 1941	3 May 1945
Marilyn Horne	253	mezzo-soprano	3 March 1970	14 March 2010
Deborah Voigt	252	soprano	14 April 1985	13 March 2016
George Shirley	252	tenor	6 April 1961	22 October 1983
Thomas Salignac	252	tenor	11 December 1896	27 April 1903
Kim Josephson	251	baritone	10 October 1991	1 December 2011
Cesare Sodero	250	conductor	28 November 1942	17 May 1947
Roald Reitan	250	baritone	20 March 1959	22 May 1963
Ruthanna Boris	250	dancer	16 December 1935	24 April 1943
Nadine Conner	249	soprano	22 December 1941	12 March 1960
Dinh Gilly	248	baritone	16 November 1909	2 May 1914
Marie Sundelius	248	soprano	25 November 1916	11 March 1928
Pearl Besuner	248	soprano	1 December 1928	23 January 1941
Antoinette Peloso	245	dancer	25 September 1970	28 April 2001
William Mellow	245	tenor	22 September 1966	3 March 1993
Eugenia Mantelli	244	mezzo-soprano	23 November 1894	27 November 1902
Karl Laufkötter	244	tenor	23 December 1936	11 May 1950
Sofia Scalchi	244	mezzo-soprano	22 October 1883	24 April 1896
Mark Baker	243	tenor	20 April 1986	24 June 2005
Keith Miller	242	bass	31 August 2006	6 May 2015
Sophie Braslau	242	mezzo-soprano	27 November 1913	3 April 1920
Alfred Walker	241	bass-baritone	16 March 1998	24 January 2026
Marcello Giordani	241	tenor	16 June 1993	13 February 2016
Mary Fercana	240	soprano	1 December 1959	5 July 1997
Hugh Thompson	239	baritone	1 December 1944	16 October 1963
Marina Svetlova	239	dancer	23 November 1943	13 May 1950
Bidú Sayão	238	soprano	13 February 1937	22 October 1983
Herbert Graf	238	opera producer	26 December 1936	1 December 1984
John Relyea	238	bass-baritone	24 February 2000	23 December 2022
Nellie Melba	238	soprano	4 December 1893	29 November 1910
Ruth Ann Swenson	238	soprano	2 July 1988	20 March 2010
Sondra Kelly	237	mezzo-soprano	17 November 1988	9 April 1994
Merle Alcock	236	mezzo-soprano	14 December 1919	12 April 1929
John Dudley	235	tenor	6 December 1940	8 May 1944
Judith Forst	234	mezzo-soprano	19 September 1968	14 November 2013
Kevin Short	234	bass	2 April 1989	24 January 2026
Thomas Hampson	234	baritone	5 April 1981	25 March 2017
William Lewis	234	tenor	1 March 1958	3 March 1992
Algerd Brazis	233	baritone	15 November 1951	29 May 1954
Frank Coffey	233	bass	24 September 1971	11 November 1994
William Fleck	233	bass	18 December 1980	7 November 1987
René Pape	232	bass	1 June 1992	15 March 2025
Teresa Zylis-Gara	232	soprano	17 December 1968	31 March 1984
William Wilderman	232	bass	8 January 1958	15 February 1984
Sondra Radvanovsky	231	soprano	23 April 1995	23 January 2025
Claudia Waite	230	soprano	14 December 1998	7 May 2016
Donald Gramm	230	bass	10 January 1964	5 March 1983
Marita Farell	230	soprano	3 December 1937	19 May 1947
Herman Marcus	229	bass	7 April 1970	8 March 1997
Michael Devlin	229	bass-baritone	23 November 1978	13 May 2011
Richard Bonynge	229	conductor	12 December 1966	6 April 1991
Fabio Luisi	228	conductor	3 March 2005	12 November 2016
Ferruccio Furlanetto	228	bass	26 February 1980	14 May 2022
Paula Lenchner	227	soprano	3 December 1947	29 May 1953
Virgilio Lazzari	227	bass	28 December 1933	5 December 1950
Edward Johnson	226	tenor	16 November 1922	4 April 1935
John Horton Murray	226	tenor	8 October 1990	27 December 2005
Kathleen Battle	226	soprano	22 December 1977	12 May 2024
Jack Hertzog	225	dancer	8 December 1967	21 December 1985
Patrice Munsel	225	soprano	14 March 1943	22 October 1983
Anthony Marlowe	224	tenor	26 December 1939	31 March 1949
Cynthia Munzer	224	mezzo-soprano	25 March 1973	9 April 1977
Julius Huehn	224	baritone	21 December 1935	23 March 1946
Nannette Guilford	224	soprano	10 November 1923	27 March 1932
Birgit Nilsson	223	soprano	18 December 1959	27 April 1996
Joan Sutherland	223	soprano	26 November 1961	12 March 1989
Peggy Smithers	223	dancer	30 November 1944	24 February 1951
Ramón Vargas	223	tenor	18 December 1992	12 December 2015
Robert Maher	223	bass	21 December 1993	13 December 2013
Ashley Emerson	220	soprano	2 October 2007	26 April 2025
Catherine Malfitano	220	soprano	24 December 1979	28 December 2002
Mario Chamlee	220	tenor	22 November 1920	20 November 1963
Pavel Ludikar	220	bass	16 November 1926	23 April 1932
Alexis Dolinoff	219	dancer	25 November 1941	24 March 1945
Maurizio Benini	218	conductor	19 January 1998	25 March 2023
Annemarie Lucania	216	dancer	3 March 1994	24 April 2010
Grace Bumbry	216	soprano	7 October 1965	27 April 1996
Leona Mitchell	215	soprano	15 December 1975	20 January 1993
Tamara Mumford	215	mezzo-soprano	13 March 2006	24 May 2025
Vaclovas Daunoras	215	bass	2 October 1996	5 May 2005
Gail Robinson	214	soprano	27 March 1966	14 October 1987
Mariusz Kwiecien	214	baritone	2 January 1999	20 November 2018
Louise Wohlafka	213	soprano	18 January 1978	17 April 1987
Armando Agnini	212	opera director	20 January 1919	14 April 1934
Auguste Vianesi	212	conductor	22 October 1883	8 April 1892
Dana Talley	212	tenor	9 April 1978	26 June 1982
Jeanne Maubourg	212	mezzo-soprano	14 December 1909	25 April 1914
Leo Goeke	212	tenor	7 April 1967	7 November 1974
Diana Levy	211	dancer	13 November 1964	8 December 1990
Max Rudolf	211	conductor	13 January 1946	4 April 1975
David Bispham	210	baritone	18 November 1896	27 April 1903
Dimitri Mitropoulos	208	conductor	15 December 1954	30 April 1960
Herbert Janssen	208	baritone	24 January 1939	25 April 1952
Jennifer Check	208	soprano	27 April 2001	21 February 2020
Marie Tiffany	208	soprano	17 November 1916	3 March 1929
Mildred Allen	208	soprano	1 March 1957	2 April 1962
Neil Shicoff	208	tenor	15 October 1976	21 March 2006
Rosina Van Dyck	208	soprano	18 November 1908	17 February 1917
Allan Glassman	207	tenor	26 September 1983	28 December 2016
Brian Schexnayder	207	baritone	17 December 1980	16 February 1991
Paul Groves	207	tenor	14 April 1991	13 May 2023
Aida Doninelli	206	soprano	2 November 1928	24 March 1933
Anne Nonnemacher	206	soprano	20 February 2003	21 March 2026
Jarmila Novotna	206	soprano	5 January 1940	22 October 1983
Jeanne Gordon	206	mezzo-soprano	22 November 1919	12 April 1928
Heidi Grant Murphy	205	soprano	10 April 1988	12 December 2009
Marcus Bugler	205	dancer	6 November 1974	25 April 2001
Leontyne Price	204	soprano	6 April 1953	24 March 1985
Pietro Cimara	204	conductor	8 December 1929	13 January 1958
Frieda Hempel	203	soprano	27 December 1912	10 February 1919
Mark Oswald	203	baritone	2 April 1989	21 March 2003
Anna Moffo	202	soprano	14 November 1959	22 October 1983
John Trehy	202	bass	2 November 1958	15 April 1974
Michael Bohnen	202	bass	1 March 1923	13 April 1932
Susan Graham	202	mezzo-soprano	10 April 1988	12 November 2025
Cecil Arden	201	mezzo-soprano	12 January 1918	18 April 1926
Claudia Muzio	201	soprano	4 December 1916	16 January 1934
Astrid Varnay	200	soprano	6 December 1941	22 December 1979
Dennis Williams	200	tenor	11 November 1989	6 January 2011
Luben Vichey	200	bass	4 December 1948	29 November 1965
Martina Arroyo	200	soprano	14 March 1959	21 April 2002
Sergei Koptchak	200	bass	3 June 1983	23 June 2006
John Carpenter	199	tenor	28 March 1976	13 June 1980
Yvonne Gonzales Redman	199	soprano	5 April 1992	12 April 2008
Richard Hageman	198	conductor	24 November 1908	10 February 1937
Alan Held	197	baritone	17 April 1989	6 January 2023
Hans Clemens	197	tenor	1 November 1930	16 March 1938
Mario Ancona	197	baritone	11 December 1893	6 April 1897
Ryan Speedo Green	197	bass-baritone	13 March 2011	2 April 2026
Maria Müller	196	soprano	21 January 1925	7 March 1935
Marie Rappold	196	soprano	22 November 1905	25 April 1920
Colette Boky	195	soprano	28 October 1967	9 June 1979
Robert Lloyd	195	bass	26 October 1988	22 September 2008
Carol Vaness	194	soprano	20 March 1977	13 March 2004
Herbert Witherspoon	194	bass	22 November 1908	28 March 1916
Otto Kemlitz	194	tenor	17 November 1884	9 April 1891
Adolf Robinson	193	baritone	17 November 1884	22 March 1889
Hermann Weil	193	baritone	17 November 1911	19 April 1917
Joyce Guyer	193	soprano	5 April 1981	6 May 2004
Judith Christin	193	mezzo-soprano	29 March 1989	5 January 2002
Mitchell Sendrowitz	193	bass	22 December 1986	15 May 2010
Richard J. Clark	193	baritone	26 June 1981	29 June 1990
Terry Cook	193	bass	9 April 1978	21 October 2006
Thomas Fulton	193	conductor	4 March 1979	25 June 1994
Anna Netrebko	192	soprano	14 February 2002	25 April 2020
Thomas Stewart	192	baritone	9 March 1966	20 November 1993
Douglas Ahlstedt	191	tenor	25 March 1973	14 April 1988
Charles Kuestner	190	tenor	7 January 1957	7 June 1978
Edith Jerell	190	dancer	12 April 1958	18 June 1966
Carl Jörn	189	tenor	22 January 1909	19 April 1914
Claudia Catania	189	mezzo-soprano	12 February 1981	9 December 1989
Marianne Brandt	189	mezzo-soprano	19 November 1884	17 March 1888
Ermanno Mauro	188	tenor	6 January 1978	15 February 1993
John Gilmore	188	tenor	12 October 1981	10 January 1992
William Dooley	188	baritone	15 February 1964	11 March 1977
Emily Pulley	187	soprano	18 April 1993	30 November 2005
Jeff Mattsey	186	baritone	19 February 1998	10 January 2019
Daniel Clark Smith	185	tenor	16 June 2004	23 September 2024
Kurt Phinney	185	tenor	29 December 1997	3 January 2026
Wendy Bryn Harmer	184	soprano	2 November 2005	21 October 2023
Dmitri Hvorostovsky	183	baritone	26 October 1995	7 May 2017
Frank Lopardo	183	tenor	31 January 1989	30 November 2005
Hans Kautsky	183	set designer	18 November 1911	22 January 1953
Jules Speck	183	opera director	14 November 1908	31 March 1917
Leo Nucci	182	baritone	22 February 1980	11 December 2004
Margarete Ober	182	mezzo-soprano	21 November 1913	27 April 1917
Joseph Fritz	181	dancer	23 September 1986	8 November 2004
Joyce Olson	181	mezzo-soprano	22 May 1971	25 November 2000
Max Alvary	181	tenor	25 November 1885	17 May 1889
Zachary Solov	181	choreographer	3 March 1951	14 February 1990
Hal Roberts	180	tenor	23 February 1956	31 March 1979
John Reardon	180	baritone	28 September 1965	6 April 1977
Peter Mattei	180	baritone	24 January 2002	24 May 2025
Isabel Leonard	179	mezzo-soprano	25 September 2007	4 February 2026
Mathilde Castel-Bert	179	costume designer	22 November 1919	9 March 1962
Rafaelo Díaz	179	tenor	5 January 1918	5 February 1930
Theodore Meux	179	baritone	8 November 1898	25 April 1900
Mario Sala	178	set designer	16 November 1908	25 December 1954
Reveka Evangelia Mavrovitis	178	mezzo-soprano	25 November 1995	6 May 2011
Richard Woitach	178	conductor	29 March 1963	9 December 1995
Agostino Carbone	177	bass	28 November 1891	8 April 1899
Ildar Abdrazakov	177	bass-baritone	1 March 2004	25 April 2020
Kathryn Day	177	mezzo-soprano	25 March 1973	1 April 2017
Pauline Andrey	177	dancer	26 March 1964	3 March 1992
Stephen Paynter	177	tenor	22 February 2001	3 January 2026
Arthur Apy	176	tenor	10 December 1973	10 March 1995
Helen Traubel	176	soprano	12 May 1937	21 March 1953
Patricia Racette	176	soprano	4 March 1995	28 December 2016
Raymond Aceto	176	bass	19 October 1992	7 June 2025
Richard Leech	176	tenor	30 September 1989	11 May 2012
Dezsö Ernster	175	bass	20 November 1946	17 December 1963
Franz Mazura	175	bass	12 December 1980	20 April 2002
Michel Sénéchal	175	tenor	8 March 1982	19 September 2005
Philippe Flon	175	conductor	23 November 1900	27 April 1903
Piotr Beczala	175	tenor	19 December 2006	13 December 2025
Lisa Della Casa	174	soprano	20 November 1953	9 December 1967
Ricardo Costa	174	dancer	8 December 1978	23 March 1996
Carrie Bridewell	173	mezzo-soprano	25 March 1900	21 April 1903
Lenus Carlson	173	baritone	23 February 1973	19 January 1991
Samuel Thewman	173	opera director	15 November 1920	23 February 1929
Sandra Warfield	173	mezzo-soprano	20 November 1953	13 January 1972
Vittorio Podesti	173	conductor	8 November 1909	8 January 1912
Rosa Olitzka	172	mezzo-soprano	30 November 1895	27 April 1901
David Asch	171	bass	22 October 1991	24 March 2008
Dorothy Shawn	171	mezzo-soprano	21 February 1953	29 May 1976
Hildegard Behrens	171	soprano	1 October 1976	24 April 1999
Susanne Mentzer	171	mezzo-soprano	4 January 1989	26 March 2016
Timothy Jenkins	171	tenor	10 December 1979	3 March 1989
Carl Braun	170	bass	8 February 1913	28 April 1917
Julia Claussen	170	mezzo-soprano	23 November 1917	19 April 1932
Lloyd Strang	170	bass	11 February 1959	2 January 1970
Ramon Vinay	170	tenor	22 February 1946	22 October 1983
Denyce Graves	169	mezzo-soprano	7 October 1995	24 January 2026
Florence Wickham	169	mezzo-soprano	17 November 1909	27 April 1912
Bruna Castagna	168	mezzo-soprano	2 March 1936	14 April 1945
Emil Cooper	168	conductor	26 January 1944	13 May 1950
George Schick	168	conductor	22 December 1958	7 June 1969
Christian Badea	167	conductor	5 May 1986	5 July 1997
Ellen Rievman	167	dancer	31 October 1972	14 February 1992
Kimberly Graves	167	dancer	17 November 1978	1 May 1993
Roberto Alagna	167	tenor	10 April 1996	19 April 2024
Dimitri Kavrakos	166	bass	4 March 1979	2 November 2007
Elda Vettori	166	soprano	20 November 1926	28 March 1937
Lilyan Ogden	166	dancer	16 March 1911	4 April 1932
Lisette Oropesa	166	soprano	20 March 2005	10 April 2026
Maria Guleghina	166	soprano	3 January 1991	11 November 2015
Maurizio Muraro	166	bass-baritone	2 November 2005	13 December 2025
Charles Gilibert	165	baritone	9 November 1900	27 April 1903
Valery Gergiev	165	conductor	21 March 1994	10 March 2020
Gladys Kriese	164	mezzo-soprano	22 December 1961	5 June 1966
Richard Bonelli	164	baritone	29 November 1932	14 March 1945
Gilda Cruz-Romo	163	soprano	5 April 1970	15 May 1984
Zeljko Lucic	163	baritone	26 September 2006	15 April 2023
Brian Sullivan	162	tenor	23 February 1948	30 January 1961
Christopher Stocker	162	dancer	2 May 1980	23 October 1997
Elyssa Lindner	162	soprano	28 September 1971	10 January 1998
Enrico Di Giuseppe	162	tenor	20 June 1969	22 December 1986
Martial Singher	162	baritone	10 December 1943	27 December 1958
Aprile Millo	161	soprano	20 June 1984	14 April 2007
Barbara Bystrom	161	mezzo-soprano	20 November 1975	19 March 1994
Eve Gigliotti	161	mezzo-soprano	28 April 2010	18 January 2026
Joseph Turi	161	bass	22 October 2007	25 January 2020
Olga Borodina	161	mezzo-soprano	13 June 1997	22 November 2014
Sophie Traubmann	161	soprano	18 January 1888	9 March 1902
Stanford Olsen	161	tenor	20 April 1986	21 November 1997
Tyler Simpson	161	bass-baritone	22 November 2010	27 April 2026
Erin Morley	160	soprano	9 February 2008	12 January 2026
Meredith Derr	160	tenor	20 January 1988	18 April 2008
Orville Harrold	160	tenor	18 November 1919	20 April 1924
Richard Fracker	160	tenor	26 September 1989	17 February 2005
Florence Mulford	159	mezzo-soprano	24 December 1903	27 March 1917
Roger Andrews	159	bass	28 September 1999	26 January 2013
Brian Davis	158	baritone	22 November 1999	11 May 2007
Giuseppe Antonicelli	158	conductor	10 November 1947	13 May 1950
Joseph Pariso	158	bass	13 February 1995	12 May 2011
Mona Paulee	158	mezzo-soprano	28 November 1941	11 May 1946
Nell Rankin	158	mezzo-soprano	22 November 1951	22 October 1983
Richard Cassilly	158	tenor	20 January 1973	23 November 1990
Natalie Bodanya	157	soprano	11 May 1936	16 January 1942
Nathan Gunn	157	baritone	27 March 1994	12 June 2019
Fritz Reiner	156	conductor	4 February 1949	26 May 1953
Mack Harrell	156	baritone	16 December 1939	20 March 1958
Spiro Malas	156	bass	25 March 1960	23 March 1990
Belén Amparan	155	mezzo-soprano	29 November 1956	20 October 1967
Helen Mapleson	155	mezzo-soprano	22 January 1902	28 March 1914
Otto Schenk	155	stage director	4 October 1968	30 November 2023
Philip Kinsman	155	bass	12 November 1946	13 May 1950
Anna Case	154	soprano	15 November 1909	20 November 1963
Frances Greer	154	soprano	15 March 1942	7 February 1950
Michelangelo Veltri	154	conductor	10 November 1971	20 October 1994
Oren Gradus	154	bass	14 December 2002	6 April 2019
Emma Borniggia	153	mezzo-soprano	23 November 1908	18 March 1922
Vera Curtis	153	soprano	23 November 1912	25 April 1920
Jennifer Johnson Cano	152	mezzo-soprano	24 February 2008	27 March 2026
Juhwan Lee	151	tenor	22 August 2006	28 March 2026
Maria Duchène	151	mezzo-soprano	16 March 1912	18 April 1916
Carlo Tomanelli	150	bass	10 March 1951	11 April 1966
Giuseppe Cernusco	150	bass	20 November 1891	4 March 1905
John Fiorito	150	baritone	29 March 1963	12 April 2003
Karita Mattila	150	soprano	22 March 1990	11 May 2019
Nathaniel Merrill	150	opera director	3 November 1956	22 November 2013
Pilar Lorengar	150	soprano	11 February 1966	4 March 1982
Raoul Jobin	150	tenor	19 February 1940	30 May 1957
Frances Peralta	149	soprano	25 December 1920	12 January 1930
George Gagnidze	149	baritone	27 January 2009	11 October 2024
Wilhelm Von Wymetal	149	opera director	17 November 1922	27 February 1935
Fiorenza Cossotto	148	mezzo-soprano	6 February 1968	21 January 1989
Jan Behr	148	conductor	13 February 1962	24 June 1977
Janis Martin	148	mezzo-soprano, soprano	23 March 1962	17 April 1997
Korliss Uecker	148	soprano	9 November 1991	8 May 2004
Quinn Kelsey	148	baritone	29 March 2008	27 March 2026
Alois Burgstaller	147	tenor	29 January 1903	23 January 1909
Blaschke & Cie	147	costume designer	24 December 1903	24 November 1951
Deanne Lay	147	dancer	6 December 1982	25 November 2000
Dennis Petersen	147	tenor	10 November 1994	11 March 2015
Silvio Varviso	147	conductor	26 November 1961	2 April 1983
David Frye	146	tenor	13 October 1994	16 May 2008
Edoardo Müller	146	conductor	2 November 1984	5 January 2006
Jan-Hendrik Rootering	146	bass	15 January 1987	20 December 2000
Otto Edelmann	146	bass	11 November 1954	7 April 1976
Pierre Monteux	146	conductor	17 November 1917	4 February 1956
Thomas Chalmers	146	baritone	17 November 1917	20 November 1963
Jean Morel	145	conductor	21 December 1956	10 February 1971
Joyce DiDonato	145	mezzo-soprano	2 November 2005	29 April 2026
Susanna Phillips	145	soprano	20 March 2005	12 December 2025
Gina Torriani	144	dancer	16 November 1908	21 April 1911
Jessie Rogge	144	dancer	15 April 1912	10 April 1935
Suzanne Adams	144	soprano	8 November 1898	4 February 1903
Christine Weidinger	143	soprano	24 November 1972	20 November 1992
Lila Robeson	143	mezzo-soprano	18 November 1912	3 March 1920
Mario Del Monaco	143	tenor	27 November 1950	3 January 1959
William Hinshaw	143	baritone	16 November 1910	23 April 1913
Gertrude Kappel	142	soprano	16 January 1928	7 March 1936
Joseph Novak	142	set designer	24 January 1914	9 March 1962
Lillian Raymondi	142	soprano	27 November 1942	10 April 1951
Marcelo Álvarez	142	tenor	23 November 1998	27 April 2023
MaryAnn McCormick	142	mezzo-soprano	19 December 1991	22 February 2020
Christian Van Horn	141	bass	6 April 2003	23 January 2026
Fritzi Scheff	141	soprano	9 November 1900	27 April 1903
Jeremy Ives	141	dancer	6 August 1966	13 January 1977
Yohan Yi	141	baritone	24 March 2016	27 April 2026
Joy Clements	140	soprano	23 October 1963	1 June 1972
Lilian Sukis	140	soprano	10 March 1966	9 December 1972
Mirella Freni	140	soprano	29 September 1965	20 May 2006
Norman Andersson	140	bass	26 June 1981	27 June 1986
Ross Crolius	140	bass	27 September 1985	15 December 2001
Theodora Hanslowe	140	mezzo-soprano	24 March 1994	1 December 2018
David Lowe	139	tenor	7 December 2000	15 February 2018
Diana Damrau	139	soprano	24 September 2005	24 October 2020
Henry Lewis	139	conductor	7 August 1965	7 June 1977
Louise Hunter	139	soprano	11 November 1923	30 April 1927
Rolf Gérard	139	designer(Rolf Gérard)	6 November 1950	16 March 1998
Sasha Semin	139	tenor	30 September 2000	16 November 2021
Victoria de los Angeles	139	soprano	17 March 1951	29 May 1961
Boris Romanoff	138	choreographer	24 November 1938	16 February 1950
David Won	138	baritone	14 November 2005	6 March 2019
Giuseppe Tecchi	138	tenor	20 November 1907	29 April 1910
Hilde Güden	138	soprano	15 November 1951	17 March 1960
Lambert Murphy	138	tenor	16 November 1911	29 April 1914
Rudolf Mayreder	138	bass	22 January 1953	21 May 1963
Sam Meredith	138	dancer	25 September 2001	14 April 2017
Margaret Lattimore	137	mezzo-soprano	18 April 1993	11 January 2018
Myra Merritt	137	soprano	21 January 1982	23 June 1991
Aage Haugland	136	bass	13 December 1979	10 June 1993
Amir Levy	136	dancer	4 March 2002	28 March 2026
Ben Heppner	136	tenor	10 April 1988	15 March 2009
James Fox	136	set designer	23 January 1904	27 November 1943
Lempriere Pringle	136	bass	7 November 1898	25 April 1900
Madelaine Chambers	136	soprano	23 February 1956	10 April 1959
Emilia Cundari	135	soprano	6 February 1956	30 March 1959
Kiri Te Kanawa	135	soprano	9 February 1974	6 January 2012
Alfredo Kraus	134	tenor	16 February 1966	27 April 1996
Andrew Robinson	134	dancer	4 March 2002	31 December 2019
Auguste Seidl-Kraus	134	soprano	17 November 1884	17 March 1888
David Rendall	134	tenor	28 February 1980	9 April 1988
Donald Peck	134	bass	21 November 1977	3 March 2001
Edilio Ferraro	134	dancer	24 February 1961	15 December 1976
Félicie Kaschowska	134	soprano	28 November 1888	27 April 1909
Morris Robinson	134	bass	28 April 2002	9 May 2025
Carl Burrian	133	tenor	30 November 1906	6 February 1913
Elizabeth Coss	133	soprano	5 December 1977	3 January 1986
Franco Farina	133	tenor	13 October 1990	7 December 2007
Constance Green	132	soprano	18 April 1983	22 February 2005
Franco Zeffirelli	132	opera director	6 March 1964	28 February 2024
Hsin-Ping Chang	132	dancer	25 September 2006	28 March 2026
Joan Wall	132	mezzo-soprano	28 October 1959	30 May 1962
Johannes Sembach	132	tenor	26 November 1914	23 April 1922
Josef Levinoff	132	dancer	6 March 1931	2 May 1941
Laura Robertson	132	soprano	16 November 1922	6 May 1926
Matti Salminen	132	bass	9 January 1981	28 March 2008
Richard Margison	132	tenor	12 April 1995	6 November 2009
Set Svanholm	132	tenor	15 November 1946	6 April 1956
Eric Owens	131	bass-baritone	31 March 1996	13 May 2023
Ludwig Hofmann	131	bass	24 November 1932	19 March 1938
Anne Bollinger	130	soprano	1 January 1949	3 April 1953
Christine Goerke	130	soprano	3 April 1995	19 April 2024
Jacques Urlus	130	tenor	8 February 1913	13 April 1917
Jason Hendrix	130	bass	30 October 2004	10 March 2018
Nira Paaz	130	dancer	6 November 1963	22 June 1970
Geraldine Decker	129	mezzo-soprano	17 December 1980	23 March 1987
Ignace Strasfogel	129	conductor	6 May 1957	6 July 1973
Louise Meisslinger	129	mezzo-soprano	21 November 1887	19 April 1899
Stefan Kocán	129	bass	2 October 2009	20 March 2019
Tilda Morse	129	dancer	27 December 1946	11 May 1953
Edoardo Missiano	128	baritone	17 November 1908	2 December 1911
Eugene Conley	128	tenor	25 January 1950	8 May 1956
Grant Mouradoff	128	dancer	26 November 1938	5 May 1941
Kurt Moll	128	bass	18 September 1978	23 April 2005
Maria Leone	128	soprano	20 November 1953	6 December 1956
Nicholas Massue	128	tenor	16 May 1936	3 April 1941
Patricia Steiner	128	mezzo-soprano	12 March 1994	13 December 2019
Vladimir Ognovenko	128	bass	10 November 1994	29 November 2014
Yanni Yannissis	128	bass	1 April 1992	12 April 1999
Adam Plachetka	127	bass-baritone	4 February 2015	29 November 2025
Jonathan Scott	127	baritone	25 October 2019	10 April 2026
Louise Lerch	127	soprano	7 November 1926	24 January 1932
Matteo Manuguerra	127	baritone	11 January 1971	28 February 1992
Michelle DeYoung	127	mezzo-soprano	5 April 1992	24 May 2025
Richard Firmin	127	tenor	16 March 1973	15 November 1986
Régine Crespin	127	soprano	19 November 1962	16 April 1987
Shirley Verrett	127	soprano	6 April 1961	2 May 1990
Stella Roman	127	soprano	1 January 1941	22 October 1983
Frederick Burchinal	126	baritone	18 October 1974	12 May 2007
Jean Fenn	126	soprano	21 November 1953	23 January 1970
Nina Morgana	126	soprano	28 March 1920	20 November 1963
Victoria Livengood	126	mezzo-soprano	14 April 1985	24 April 2014
Elissa Minet	125	dancer	22 December 1940	13 May 1950
Irwin Reese	125	tenor	21 December 1989	6 January 2011
Jon Garrison	125	tenor	18 October 1974	6 January 1996
Milka Ternina	125	soprano	10 November 1899	25 April 1904
Vittorio Navarini	125	bass	28 November 1906	29 April 1908
Armand Castelmary	124	bass	27 November 1893	10 February 1897
Audrey Keane	124	dancer	27 December 1946	13 April 1963
Eric Halfvarson	124	bass	22 January 1993	16 March 2013
Jan Mickens	124	dancer	24 March 1964	7 April 1976
Jerry Hadley	124	tenor	7 March 1987	11 May 2002
Nancy Williams	124	mezzo-soprano	2 April 1966	9 March 1973
Richard Manning	124	tenor	30 November 1944	22 May 1946
Gabriel Bacquier	123	baritone	17 October 1964	17 November 1982
Jean Lassalle	123	baritone	15 January 1892	17 April 1897
Joseph Macpherson	123	bass	30 December 1926	27 March 1932
Jussi Björling	123	tenor	24 November 1938	22 December 1959
Lillian Moore	123	dancer	26 April 1930	5 March 1942
Alessandro Bonci	122	tenor	22 November 1907	30 April 1910
Arthur Carron	122	tenor	29 May 1936	3 March 1946
Donald Maxwell	122	baritone	21 April 2008	27 April 2026
Giovanni Martino	122	bass	25 October 1919	27 February 1927
Giuseppe Valdengo	122	baritone	19 December 1947	27 January 1954
Katherine Moran	122	soprano	24 December 1903	10 April 1908
Ross Benoliel	122	bass	18 October 2016	21 February 2026
Stephen Costello	122	tenor	24 September 2007	12 December 2025
Alexey Lavrov	121	baritone	22 February 2013	25 January 2025
Barbara Frittoli	121	soprano	7 October 1995	26 February 2016
David Holloway	121	baritone	16 October 1973	16 March 1987
Fritz Busch	121	conductor	26 November 1945	12 May 1949
Giuseppe Patanè	121	conductor	18 October 1975	12 February 1983
Greg Fedderly	121	tenor	22 November 2003	19 January 2018
Marty Singleton	121	tenor	1 February 1993	15 January 2010
Nahan Franko	121	conductor	15 February 1885	17 December 1912
Donald McIntyre	120	baritone	15 February 1975	1 February 1996
Kevin Augustine	120	puppeteer	8 October 2007	28 March 2026
Louise Bérat	120	mezzo-soprano	24 November 1919	17 April 1922
Barbara Daniels	119	soprano	30 September 1983	10 February 1996
Bruno Walter	119	conductor	14 February 1941	29 March 1959
Christa Ludwig	119	mezzo-soprano	10 December 1959	3 April 1993
Kate Lindsey	119	mezzo-soprano	20 September 2005	20 October 2022
Mary Bonetti	119	mezzo-soprano	5 November 1924	6 March 1932
Patrick Miller	119	tenor	11 November 2017	10 April 2026
Sandra Piques Eddy	119	mezzo-soprano	13 December 2001	15 December 2018
Albert Mittelhauser	118	tenor	28 November 1888	10 May 1890
Maria Barrientos	118	soprano	31 January 1916	1 May 1920
Mary Mellish	118	soprano	23 November 1918	6 April 1924
Pablo Elvira	118	baritone	27 March 1966	21 April 1990
Roger Crouthamel	118	tenor	17 December 1988	6 January 2011
Ron Bottcher	118	baritone	25 March 1960	22 June 1968
Suzanne Der Derian	118	soprano	18 December 1973	10 March 1995
Domenico Simeone	117	bass	29 January 1973	21 April 1984
Georges Mauguière	117	tenor	29 November 1893	24 April 1896
Martin Rich	117	conductor	25 January 1955	26 April 1975
Tancredi Pasero	117	bass	1 November 1929	9 March 1933
Tom Lee	117	puppeteer	8 October 2007	28 March 2026
Veni Warwick	117	soprano	13 November 1912	22 April 1922
Bianca Froehlich	116	dancer	17 February 1904	18 April 1908
Fawayne Murphy	116	tenor	10 April 1971	17 March 1984
Giuseppe Cremonini	116	tenor	29 November 1895	24 April 1901
Marion Weed	116	soprano	29 April 1894	29 April 1908
Martti Talvela	116	bass	7 October 1968	12 March 1988
René Maison	116	tenor	3 February 1936	19 February 1943
Riccardo Tegani	116	baritone	21 November 1914	21 April 1917
Thomas Andrew	116	dancer	8 April 1957	7 February 1991
Aristide Masiero	115	tenor	9 November 1900	22 April 1904
Bertrand de Billy	115	conductor	16 March 1998	28 January 2023
Carlo Coscia	115	bass	27 December 1929	12 April 1944
Frank D'Elia	115	tenor	6 April 1951	12 December 1970
Ilona Murai	115	dancer	6 December 1940	10 May 1948
Marguerite Marilly	115	soprano	25 November 1900	22 April 1903
Matthew Rose	115	bass	18 November 2011	3 January 2026
Nancy King	115	dancer	17 February 1957	9 April 1963
Richard Paul Fink	115	bass-baritone	13 March 1998	26 November 2013
Sam Cardea	115	dancer	20 February 1981	14 January 2000
Cesare Valletti	114	tenor	10 December 1953	22 October 1983
Inge Manski	114	soprano	19 November 1947	12 May 1950
James King	114	tenor	8 January 1966	27 April 1996
Louise Cox	114	soprano	13 November 1912	21 April 1916
Monica Yunus	114	soprano	1 October 2003	20 March 2014
Adriana Maliponte	113	soprano	19 March 1971	15 March 1986
Aleksandra Kurzak	113	soprano	10 December 2004	25 April 2026
Ernest Van Dyck	113	tenor	9 November 1898	19 April 1902
Rose Bampton	113	soprano	22 November 1932	22 October 1983
Thalia Sabanieeva	113	soprano	24 February 1923	24 March 1935
Victor Maurel	113	baritone	3 December 1894	28 February 1919
Alma Gluck	112	soprano	16 November 1909	26 February 1933
Emil Sänger	112	bass	23 November 1885	17 March 1888
Giuliano Ciannella	112	tenor	13 June 1979	14 June 1996
Giuseppe Di Stefano	112	tenor	25 February 1948	27 January 1965
Giuseppe Sturani	112	conductor	22 November 1911	26 February 1933
John Hancock	112	baritone	4 March 2002	25 April 2026
Leo Slezak	112	tenor	17 November 1909	31 January 1913
Ying Fang	112	soprano	23 July 2013	15 March 2025
Alexis Kosloff	111	dancer	21 January 1924	25 April 1942
Bryn Terfel	111	bass-baritone	19 October 1994	23 January 2025
Jean Braham	111	soprano	6 December 2000	16 March 2018
Juan Diego Flórez	111	tenor	10 January 2002	29 December 2018
Katharyn Horne	111	dancer	22 March 1959	31 July 1965
Kwangchul Youn	111	bass	8 October 2004	26 October 2019
Mariano Caruso	111	tenor	17 December 1962	22 March 1969
Ned Hanlon	111	bass	13 April 2017	21 February 2026
Peter J. Hall	111	costume designer	25 March 1972	10 October 2023
Ruggero Raimondi	111	bass	14 September 1970	29 February 2008
Danielle de Niese	110	soprano	29 October 1998	20 December 2014
Delia Rigal	110	soprano	6 November 1950	22 October 1983
Edda Moser	110	soprano	22 November 1968	27 June 1984
Haijing Fu	110	baritone	10 April 1988	17 May 2008
John Fiore	110	conductor	2 April 1989	26 February 2004
Judith De Paul	110	soprano	13 February 1968	19 December 1972
Nino Martini	110	tenor	28 December 1933	20 April 1946
Ralph Herbert	110	bass	10 February 1955	1 October 1965
Albert Saléza	109	tenor	8 November 1898	25 March 1905
Angel Blue	109	soprano	22 June 2016	27 April 2026
Fyodor Chaliapin	109	bass	20 November 1907	20 March 1929
Günther Schneider-Siemssen	109	scenic designer	21 November 1967	30 November 2023
Jess Thomas	109	tenor	11 December 1962	22 October 1983
Joseph Beck	109	baritone	30 November 1888	10 May 1890
Joseph Calleja	109	tenor	25 October 2006	21 March 2025
Mabel Garrison	109	soprano	15 February 1914	22 January 1921
Michael Fabiano	109	tenor	1 April 2007	23 January 2026
Ottokar Bartik	109	dancer	19 February 1909	7 April 1928
Rodolfo Ferrari	109	conductor	18 November 1907	29 April 1908
Alexander Kipnis	108	bass	5 January 1940	6 May 1946
Curt Taucher	108	tenor	23 November 1922	17 January 1927
Edyth Walker	108	mezzo-soprano	30 November 1903	16 April 1906
Grace Moore	108	soprano	7 February 1928	9 February 1946
Gwendolyn Bradley	108	soprano	20 March 1977	27 January 1990
Hilda Burke	108	soprano	27 December 1935	15 February 1942
Jennifer Welch-Babidge	108	soprano	2 March 1997	13 April 2006
John Bills	108	tenor	21 April 1981	12 January 1992
Kristine Jepson	108	mezzo-soprano	7 February 1994	14 October 2006
Luca Pisaroni	108	bass-baritone	29 April 2005	17 May 2025
Maria Savage	108	soprano	30 March 1912	20 February 1943
Nina Youskevitch	108	dancer	26 November 1942	6 May 1944
Sandra Bush	108	mezzo-soprano	18 April 1983	2 April 2005
Thomas Allen	108	baritone	5 November 1981	11 January 2018
Arcangelo Rossi	107	bass	27 November 1903	22 February 1907
Dominic Cossa	107	baritone	27 March 1966	21 October 1978
Elizabeth Bishop	107	mezzo-soprano	18 April 1993	17 May 2025
Gretel Urban	107	costume designer	23 December 1920	26 February 1949
Nicola Barbusci	107	bass	26 December 1960	9 June 1976
Robert Pomakov	107	bass	28 January 2013	24 January 2026
Sebastian Catana	107	baritone	18 October 2003	14 April 2009
Vern Shinall	107	baritone	10 October 1977	4 February 1982
Veronica Villarroel	107	soprano	2 April 1989	1 April 2006
Andrew Davis	106	conductor	24 February 1981	17 January 2015
Emil Filip	106	tenor	16 October 1963	9 June 1983
Gary Lakes	106	tenor	4 February 1986	6 May 1997
Ivanka Myhal	106	mezzo-soprano	19 January 1970	29 September 1972
Lillia Snelling	106	mezzo-soprano	13 January 1909	17 April 1912
Paul Schöffler	106	baritone	26 January 1950	11 December 1964
William Hargrave	106	bass	3 December 1944	9 May 1947
Amelita Galli-Curci	105	soprano	14 November 1921	24 January 1930
Catherine MiEun Choi-Steckmeyer	105	mezzo-soprano	29 September 2010	20 April 2023
Claramae Turner	105	mezzo-soprano	16 November 1946	4 May 1950
David Hamilton	105	baritone	22 December 1986	30 June 1990
David Pittsinger	105	bass-baritone	20 November 1997	18 January 2026
Erbert Aldridge	105	tenor	19 November 1962	5 March 1993
Janet Collins	105	dancer	13 November 1951	25 May 1954
Judith Raskin	105	soprano	23 February 1962	16 March 1972
Kenneth Riegel	105	tenor	27 March 1966	24 April 1999
Laurent Novikoff	105	dancer	24 November 1941	18 March 1945
Vasile Moldoveanu	105	tenor	19 May 1977	25 October 1986
Allen Hinckley	104	bass	18 November 1908	28 February 1914
Gail Dubinbaum	104	mezzo-soprano	5 April 1981	22 November 1988
Richard Pearson	104	bass	13 March 2001	8 December 2011
William Burdick	104	dancer	22 March 1959	22 January 1996
Andrew Gangestad	103	bass	5 March 2000	4 December 2008
Gino Quilico	103	baritone	22 September 1987	15 March 2003
Marcel Reiner	103	bass	20 November 1909	2 May 1914
Peter Volpe	103	bass	14 February 2002	2 May 2012
Skiles Fairlie	103	dancer	28 January 1967	13 April 1976
Walter Kirchhoff	103	tenor	28 January 1927	20 February 1931
Ben Bliss	102	tenor	11 February 2014	25 October 2025
Brenton Ryan	102	tenor	22 April 2016	13 December 2025
Diana Soviero	102	soprano	24 February 1980	13 February 1997
Elizabeth DeShong	102	mezzo-soprano	31 December 2008	7 June 2025
Florence Quivar	102	mezzo-soprano	10 October 1977	11 June 1997
Gerald Finley	102	bass-baritone	24 January 1998	7 June 2025
Giulio Crimi	102	tenor	13 November 1918	13 February 1922
Jean Doré	102	baritone	15 December 1886	6 May 1890
Luigi Alva	102	tenor	6 March 1964	3 February 1975
Paata Burchuladze	102	bass	25 September 1989	6 December 2014
Suzanne Ames	102	dancer	5 April 1951	31 July 1965
Ann Florio	101	soprano	17 October 1968	19 November 1981
David Bernard	101	baritone	13 October 1984	10 January 1992
Georges Prêtre	101	conductor	17 October 1964	13 January 1977
Rob Besserer	101	dancer	10 November 2006	11 February 2017
Roberto Frontali	101	baritone	14 November 1992	20 March 2019
Talmage Harper	101	bass	1 February 1980	13 December 1988
William Olvis	101	tenor	18 November 1958	28 June 1968
Hilda Harris	100	mezzo-soprano	20 February 1973	10 January 1992
Leonora Corona	100	soprano	24 November 1927	31 March 1935
Thomas Capobianco	100	tenor	1 March 2022	2 January 2026
Vladimir Chernov	100	baritone	24 March 1991	15 December 2005
William Dollar	100	dancer	20 December 1935	11 April 1938
