= Nello Santi =

Italian conductor (1931–2020)

- Nello Santi (photo with 1960 dedication)
- Born: 22 September 1931; Adria (Veneto), Kingdom of Italy
- Died: 6 February 2020 (aged 88); Zürich, Switzerland
- Education: Liceo musicale of Padua
- Occupation: Opera conductor
- Organizations: Zürich Opera House; Metropolitan Opera

Nello Santi (22 September 1931 – 6 February 2020) was an Italian conductor. He was associated with the Zürich Opera House for six decades, and was a regular conductor at the Metropolitan Opera in New York City. He focused on Italian repertoire, especially operas by Verdi and Puccini, in a style following the tradition of Toscanini. He made sound and video recordings of Italian operas, including Leoncavallo's Pagliacci with Plácido Domingo, Montserrat Caballé and Sherrill Milnes in 1971; Montemezzi's L'amore dei tre re with Anna Moffo, Domingo and Pablo Elvira in 1976; Verdi's I due Foscari in 2000; and Donizetti's Don Pasquale at Zürich in 2006. Santi conducted from memory, and said "I love all of Verdi, but when he composed Rigoletto, Il trovatore and La traviata he was in a profound state of grace."

== Life ==
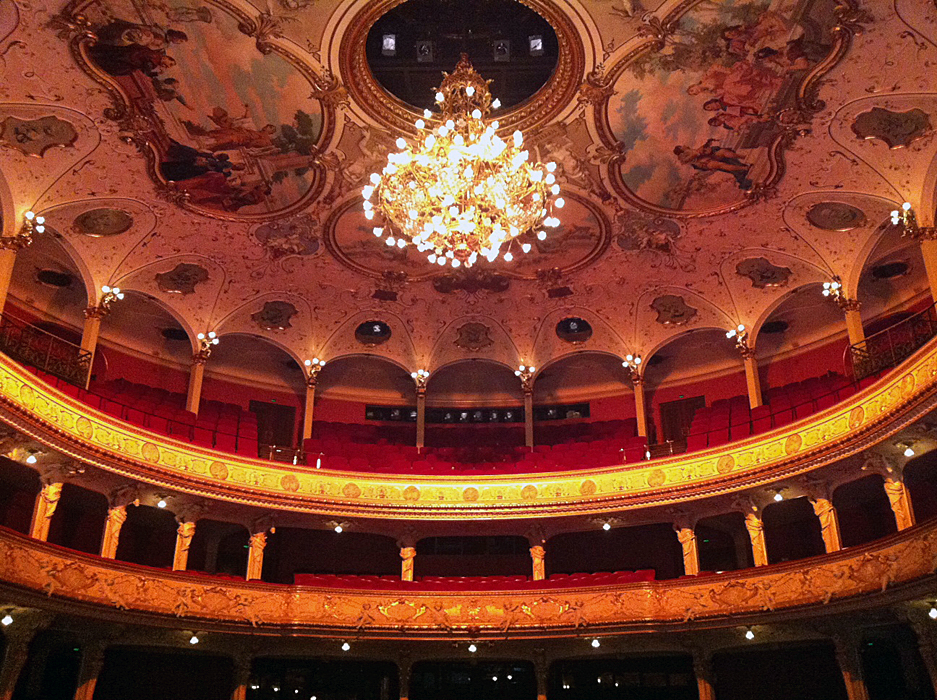
Interior of the Zürich Opera House, where Nello Santi worked for six decades

Santi was born on 22 September 1931 in Adria (Veneto), Kingdom of Italy, to Giovanni and Alfonsina (née Fonso) Santi. His mother took him to an open-air performance of Verdi's Rigoletto at age four, which made a lasting impression. He learned to play several instruments as a child, and studied them further at the Liceo musicale of Padua.

In 1951, he made his debut as a conductor at the Teatro Verdi in Padua, conducting Rigoletto. At the theatre, he also occasionally worked as a prompter, conductor of the chorus, accompanist of singers in concerts, substitute orchestra player and actor on stage.

Santi was appointed music director of the Zürich Opera House in 1958, where he had first conducted Verdi's La forza del destino, sung in German. He married there in 1959. He remained until 1969, and returned to conduct for decades, including rarities such as Verdi's Ernani, I Lombardi and I due Foscari, Rossini's Semiramide, Bellini's Il pirata and Donizetti's Poliuto.

As a guest, he conducted in 1960 at the Royal Opera House, at the Vienna State Opera and the Salzburg Festival. He had a contract with the Metropolitan Opera in New York City from 1962, when he made his debut with Verdi's Un ballo in maschera. From 1962 to 2000, he conducted more than 400 performances at the house. He conducted at many more opera houses all over the world including the Verona Arena.

Santi followed the tradition of Arturo Toscanini, to stay close to the score, accompanying the singers without overpowering them, but restraining "excessive liberties" in embellishments and drawn out notes. Santi was able to sing "any Italian opera vocal role from memory while conducting".

Santi retired to Riehen (canton Basel-Stadt), but still occasionally gave much-appreciated concerts in Basel and Zürich. He was often called "Papa Santi" by his fellow musicians to show their high respect for his work. In 2017, he was invited to conduct La traviata at La Scala in Milan, with Anna Netrebko in the title role, and Verdi's Nabucco, with Leo Nucci performing the title role.

Santi died in Zürich on 6 February 2020 at the age of 88 while undergoing treatment for a blood infection.

== Recordings ==
- 1971: Leoncavallo's Pagliacci with Plácido Domingo, Montserrat Caballé, Sherrill Milnes; London Symphony Orchestra and Chorus; CD: RCA Red Seal
- 1976: Montemezzi's L'amore dei tre re with Plácido Domingo, Anna Moffo, Cesare Siepi, Pablo Elvira; London Symphony Orchestra; CD: RCA Red Seal
- 1981: Umberto Giordano's Andrea Chénier with Plácido Domingo, Gabriela Beňačková, Piero Cappuccilli; Vienna State Opera orchestra and chorus; DVD: Deutsche Grammophon
- 1982: Puccini's La fanciulla del West with Carol Neblett, Plácido Domingo, Silvano Carroli; Royal Opera House Orchestra and Chorus; DVD: Kultur Video
- 1987: Rossini's Guglielmo Tell with Antonio Salvadori, Maria Chiara, Salvatore Fisichella; Condor, Zürich Opera House; TV/DVD
- 2000: Verdi's I due Foscari with Leo Nucci, Vincenzo La Scola, Alexandrina Pendatchanska; Teatro di San Carlo Orchestra and Chorus; DVD: TDK
- 2006: Donizetti's Don Pasquale with Juan Diego Flórez, Isabel Rey, Ruggero Raimondi; Zürich Opera Orchestra; DVD; DECCA OCLC 981409803
