= Tibor Kozma =

American conductor, pianist, accompanist, and vocal coach

- Portrait of Tibor Kozma.
- Born: 1909; Budapest
- Died: March 24, 1976 (aged 66–67)
- Occupations: Conductor, pianist, accompanist, and vocal coach

Tibor Kozma (1909 – 24 March 1976) was an American conductor, pianist, accompanist, and vocal coach of Hungarian birth. He began his career as an opera conductor in Europe and Ecuador before emigrating to the United States in 1941; ultimately becoming a United States citizen in 1945. He worked as a conductor, accompanist, and vocal coach in New York City during the 1940s and 1950s, notably serving on the conducting staff of the Metropolitan Opera from 1950 to 1957. He then had a successful teaching career at the Jacobs School of Music at Indiana University from 1957 until his death 19 years later.

== Biography ==
Born in Budapest, Kozma graduated from the Franz Liszt Academy of Music in 1931. He then pursued further studies in Dresden at the Hochschule für Musik "Carl Maria von Weber" in the orchestral program associated with the Sächsische Staatskapelle Dresden. After graduating in 1933 he worked as an opera conductor in Europe.

At the outbreak of World War II, Kozma left Europe to join the conducting staff at the opera house in Quito, Ecuador in 1939. In 1941 he emigrated to the United States and settled in New York City. He began his career there working as a conductor and vocal coach for Broadway productions, notably conducting Porgy and Bess and Eva Le Gallienne's production of Alice and Wonderland. He also conducted the first national tour of Carmen Jones and worked as an accompanist, notably playing for tenor Leslie Chabay in his New York City recital debut in 1950. In 1948 he became a vocal coach at the Metropolitan Opera, eventually joining the conducting staff in 1950.

Kozma made his conducting debut at the Metropolitan Opera House on January 4, 1951, leading a production of Johann Strauss II's Die Fledermaus with a cast that included Marguerite Piazza as Rosalinde, Set Svanholm as Eisenstein, Patrice Munsel as Adele, Eugene Conley as Alfred, and Jarmila Novotná as Prince Orlofsky. He conducted a total of 82 performances at the house over the next six years, including performances of Modest Mussorgsky's Boris Godunov (with Jerome Hines and Nell Rankin), Georges Bizet's Carmen (with Risë Stevens and Richard Tucker), Ruggero Leoncavallo's Pagliacci (with Lucine Amara, Ramon Vinay, and Robert Merrill), Giuseppe Verdi's Un ballo in maschera (with Zinka Milanov, Jan Peerce, Roberta Peters, and Marian Anderson), Wolfgang Amadeus Mozart's Die Zauberflöte (with Theodor Uppman and Mildred Allen), and Richard Wagner's Die Meistersinger von Nürnberg (with Otto Edelmann, Albert Da Costa, and Martha Lipton). His final assignment at the Met was on March 30, 1957, conducting Giacomo Puccini's La Bohème with Dorothy Kirsten as Mimì, Richard Tucker as Rodolfo, Laurel Hurley as Musetta, and Ettore Bastianini as Marcello.

Outside of the Met, Kozma was active as a conductor at the Empire State Music Festival during the 1950s. On July 1, 1954, he conducted a concert version of Johann Strauss II's Die Fledermaus at the Lewisohn Stadium with Lois Hunt as Adele, Regina Resnik as Rosalinda, Charles Kullman as Alfred, and Betty Allen as Prince Orlofsky. In 1960 he led Birgit Nilsson in concert at Carnegie Hall. He also worked as a guest conductor at a number of European opera houses during the 1950s and 1960s.

Kozma left the Metropolitan Opera staff to join the music faculty at Indiana University for the Fall semester of 1957. He served as the head of the school's conducting and opera theatre programs, leading the Indiana University Philharmonic and the Indiana University Opera Theatre until his death in a car crash in Bloomington, Indiana in 1976. In his will he left his large collection of books and musical scores, the "Kozma Collection", to the music library at Indiana University.
