= Chabay =

Chabay is a surname. Notable people with the surname include:

- Leslie Chabay (1907–1989), Anglicized form of László Csabay, Hungarian tenor opera singer
- Nelson Chabay (1940–2018), Uruguayan footballer
- Ruth Chabay (born 1949), American physics educator
