= Betty Allen =

American singer (1927–2009)

- Born: Elizabeth Louise Allen; March 17, 1927; Campbell, Ohio, U.S.
- Died: June 22, 2009 (aged 82); Valhalla, New York, U.S.
- Occupation: Opera singer

Betty Allen (March 17, 1927 – June 22, 2009) was an American operatic mezzo-soprano who had an active international singing career during the 1950s through the 1970s. In the latter part of her career her voice acquired a contralto-like darkening, which can be heard on her recording of Sergei Prokofiev’s Alexander Nevsky with conductor Eugene Ormandy and the Philadelphia Orchestra. She was known for her collaborations with American composers, such as Leonard Bernstein, Aaron Copland, David Diamond, Ned Rorem, and Virgil Thomson among others.

Allen was part of the first generation of black opera singers to achieve wide success and is viewed as part of an instrumental group of performers who helped break down the barriers of racial prejudice in the opera world. She was greatly admired by Bernstein and the conductor notably chose her to be the featured soloist for his final performances as music director of the New York Philharmonic in 1973. After her singing career ended, she became a lauded voice teacher and arts administrator.

== Early life and education ==
She was born Elizabeth Louise Allen, (or Betty Lou) in Campbell, Ohio, near Youngstown. Her father was a college educated math teacher who worked in a steel mill as racial prejudice prevented him from being hired in the public school system during the 1930s. Her mother earned extra money for the family by washing other people's laundry. When Allen was 12, her mother died of cancer. Afterwards her father fell into depression and alcoholism, causing Allen to leave home as a young teenager by her own choice. She spent the rest of her youth living in foster homes.

In 1943 Allen entered Wilberforce University in Xenia, Ohio, where she majored in languages. While there she was encouraged to pursue a singing career by tenor Theodor Heimann. Heimann also got her involved with the school's choir, whose membership also included a young Leontyne Price. Price and Allen became friends while singing in the choir together. After graduating she entered Connecticut's Hartford School of Music in 1947 on a scholarship where she earned a bachelor's degree in vocal performance. After graduating she moved to New York City, where she continued with further studies under Sarah Peck More, Paul Ulanowsky, and Zinka Milanov.

== Early singing career: 1950s ==
Allen's first major performance came in 1951 while studying at the Tanglewood Music Festival's Berkshire Music Center. At Tanglewood, she was chosen by Leonard Bernstein to be the mezzo-soprano soloist in a presentation of his Jeremiah Symphony with the Boston Symphony Orchestra. She made her opera debut the following year as St. Theresa II in Virgil Thomson’s Four Saints in Three Acts at the August Wilson Theatre in a production mounted by the American National Theater and Academy; twenty-nine years later she would record the role of Commère for the same opera's first complete recording. In 1952 she won the Marian Anderson Award after winning its namesake's singing competition in Philadelphia.

Allen's next forray into opera came on June 6, 1954, when she participated in the world premiere of Sam Raphling's Tin Pan Alley on a radio broadcast on WNYC. On July 1, 1954, she sang the part of Prince Orlofsky in a concert version of Johann Strauss II's Die Fledermaus at the Lewisohn Stadium under conductor Tibor Kozma. On October 28, 1954, she made her New York City Opera (NYCO) debut as Queenie in Show Boat. She spent the rest of the 1954–1955 season performing in a tour of France and North Africa after being selected by the National Music League and the Jeunesses Musicales International to participate in an artist exchange program between the United States and France.

In January 1955 Allen sang the part of the Israelite Messenger in Handel's Judas Maccabaeus with tenor Walter Carringer in the title role, the Interracial Fellowship Chorus, and conductor Harold Aks. With The Dessoff Choirs and conductor Paul Boepple she was a soloist in Claudio Monteverdi's Vespro della Beata Vergine 1610 in a concert sponsored by the Baron Carlo de Ferraris Salzano, Consul General of Italy at Carnegie Hall on April 28, 1955. She then spent the next several months on a European recital tour where she was received warmly.

On January 14, 1957, Allen excited much attention for her portrayal of the title heroine in Arthur Honegger's Judith in a concert performance of the work with the American Concert Choir and Orchestra under conductor Margaret Hillis at Town Hall. Critic Edward Downes said of her performance, "Allen sang the music of the first two acts without apparent effort. Her voice had a rich, true mezzo-soprano quality with a brilliant top, and dark reedy chest tones. It was so beautifully placed and focused that it gave the impression of being larger than it was. Her piano and even pianissimo singing had the velvet quality that carries so beautifully through an auditorium. She was a figure of regal dignity, yet she showed dramatic temperament, too." In December 1957 she was a soloist in the Oratorio Society of New York's performances of Handel's Messiah.

In January 1958 Allen made her New York recital debut at Town Hall to a warm reception. The following March she gave a critically acclaimed performance of Ernest Chausson's Chanson perpétuelle and Maurice Ravel's Chansons madécasses with the New York Chamber Music Ensemble and pianist Leonid Hambro. In December 1958 she sang the world premiere of Julia Perry's Stabat Mater in a pairing with the setting by Antonio Vivaldi.

== Later singing career: 1960s and 1970s ==
On May 5, 1960, Allen began her long partnership with Bernstein and the New York Philharmonic in a concert performance of Four Saints in Three Acts. She was a regular guest artist with the orchestra through 1975, appearing as a soloist in performances of such works as Johann Sebastian Bach's Johannes Passion, Bach's St Matthew Passion, Bach's Ich elender Mensch, wer wird mich erlösen, Beethoven's Symphony No. 9, Berg's Four Songs, Op. 2, both of Berg's settings of Theodor Storm's Schliesse mir die Augen beide, Joseph Haydn's She Never Told Her Love, Liszt's Die Legende von der heiligen Elisabeth, Mahler's Lieder eines fahrenden Gesellen, Mahler's Symphony No. 3, Mahler's Symphony No. 8, Franz Schubert's Die junge Nonne, Schubert's Erlkönig, Schubert's Winterreise, Stravinsky's A Sermon, a Narrative and a Prayer, and The Star-Spangled Banner among others. After an eleven-year absence she returned for one last performance with the orchestra in 1986.

In 1961 Allen sang Teresa to the Amina of Joan Sutherland in the American Opera Society's production of La sonnambula at Carnegie Hall. She performed with the AOS again the following year as Baba the Turk in Stravinsky's The Rake's Progress with Alexander Young as Tom Rakewell, John Reardon as Nick Shadow, and Judith Raskin as Anne Trulove. She sang the role of Armando di Gondì in Gaetano Donizetti's Maria di Rohan with the AOS in February 1963 with Ilva Ligabue in the title role and Lino Puglisi as Enrico. In March 1963 she sang Juno in Handel's Semele with conductor Johannes Somary and the Amor Artis choir and orchestra. Soprano Helen Boatwright was in the title role, Donald Gramm sang Cadmus and Somnus, and Blake Stern was Jupiter. She returned to AOS again in 1965 to sing Zaida in Rossini's Il turco in Italia with Giorgio Tadeo as Selim, Judith Raskin as Fiorilla, Elfego Esparza as Don Geronio, Jerold Siena as Narciso, and Sherrill Milnes as Prosdocimo. That year she also portrayed Clitemnestre in Gluck's Iphigénie en Aulide at the AOS with Christa Ludwig in the title role, Richard Cassilly as Achille, and Walter Berry as Agamemnon.

Allen appeared in two operas at the Midsummer Musical Festival at Philharmonic Hall in the summer of 1963. In July she sang Annio in Mozart's La clemenza di Tito under the baton of Paul Callaway. Also in the cast were Martina Arroyo as Vitellia, David Lloyd as Titus, Beverly Wolff as Sextus, Margaret Kalil as Servilia, and David Clatworthy as Publius. In August Allen portrayed the Female Chorus in Benjamin Britten's The Rape of Lucretia with Lili Chookasian in the title role, William Greene as the Male Chorus, Joan Caplan as Bianca, Joan Gavoorian as Lucia, Ara Berberian as Collatinus, David Clatworthy as Tarquinius, and Ron Bottcher as Junius.

Allen had a major triumph in 1964 as Jocasta in Stravinsky's Oedipus Rex at the Teatro Colón in Buenos Aires. She made her San Francisco Opera debut two years later as Azucena in Il trovatore with McHenry Boatwright as the Count di Luna, later reprising that role with the company in 1971. Engagements soon followed at the Canadian Opera Company (1971), the Palacio de Bellas Artes (1971), and the Washington National Opera (1972). She was committed to the New York City Opera from 1973 to 1975 where her roles included Azucena, Mistress Quickly in Falstaff, Jocasta in Oedipus rex, and Eurycleia in Il ritorno d'Ulisse in patria.

At the Santa Fe Opera Allen sang Pythia in Aribert Reimann's Melusine and Genevieve in Claude Debussy's Pelléas et Mélisande in 1972. She returned to that house in 1975 to portray Mistress Quickly and the grandmother in Manuel de Falla's La vida breve. She made her debut at the Metropolitan Opera as the Commère on February 20, 1973, in a cast that included Clamma Dale as St. Teresa I, David Britton as St. Stephen, and Barbara Hendricks as St. Settlement. She was invited to sing at Mexico´s city for Casals´hommage in The Manger. In 1975 she sang Monisha in the first fully staged production of Scott Joplin’s Treemonisha at the Houston Grand Opera. She portrayed the role again in the Fall of 1975 at the Kennedy Center and in 1976 in New York City. Other roles in her repertoire included Sesto in La Clemenza di Tito, the Sorceress in Dido and Aeneas, and Ulrica in Verdi's Un ballo in maschera.

Allen was also highly active internationally as a concert singer and recitalist during the 1960s and 1970s. She made appearances at the Caramoor, Casals, Cincinnati May, Marlboro, Ravinia, Saratoga, and Tanglewood Music Festivals. She appeared with a number of notable orchestras including the Philadelphia Orchestra and the American, Boston, Chicago, and Cincinnati symphony orchestras to name just a few. Her concert work led to collaborations with such conductors as Pierre Boulez, Pablo Casals, Edo de Waart, Antal Doráti, István Kertész, Rafael Kubelík, Erich Leinsdorf, Lorin Maazel, Charles Munch, Eugene Ormandy, Seiji Ozawa, Georg Solti, Leopold Stokowski and Enrique Gimeno. She also appeared in recitals throughout North and South America, Europe, and Asia.

== Later life and career ==
Allen's professional singing career was cut short by chronic lung problems which she blamed on her exposure to the Campbell, Ohio steel mills in her childhood. Although she made a handful of concert appearances into the 1980s, her opera career was over by the late 1970s. From 1969 up until her death she served on the faculty of the Manhattan School of Music. She also served on the faculties of both the Curtis Institute of Music (masterclasses since 1987) and the North Carolina School of the Arts (1978-1987).

In 1979 Allen became the executive director of the Harlem School of the Arts, later becoming president in 1992. In September 1989 she became the first American to teach a masterclass at the Saint Petersburg Conservatory through a cultural exchange program with the Harlem School of the Arts. She was also active as an adjudicator for many vocal competitions, such as the Metropolitan Opera Regional Auditions, the Young Concert Artists, and the Dutch International Vocal Competition 's-Hertogenbosch among others. She died in Valhalla, New York, at the age of 82.

Allen was also active as a member of the boards of numerous arts organizations, including the Board of Directors and Executive Committee of the Carnegie Hall, the National Foundation for the Advancement of the Arts, the Manhattan School of Music, Arts and Business Council, the American Arts Alliance, the Chamber Music Society of Lincoln Center, the Symphony Orchestra of the New York City Housing Authority, the Oratorio Society of New York, the Independent School Orchestras, and the Children’s Storefront and Theatre Development Fund. For many year she co-chaired the Harlem Arts Advocacy Coalition and the Schomburg Commission. She was also a member of the New York City Advisory Committee for Cultural Affairs.

== Awards and honors ==
- Marian Anderson Award (1952)
- Martha Baird Rockefeller Music Fund Award (1953)
- John Hay Whitney Grant (1953)
- Ford Foundation Grant (1954)
- Honorary doctorate of Humane Letters from Wittenberg University (1971)
- Honorary doctorate of music from Union College (1981)
- American Eagle Award from the National Music Council (1988)
- Philadelphia National Bank Distinguished Artist of the Year (1989)
- Exceptional Achievement Award from the Women’s Project and Productions
- First recipient of the ISO Award from the Independent School Orchestras
- Laurel Leaf Award from the American Composers Alliance
