= Elizabeth Fischer Monastero =

American opera singer

Elizabeth Fischer Monastero was an American operatic mezzo-soprano and voice teacher.

== Life and career ==
Born Elizabeth Fischer and raised in Dubuque, Iowa, Fischer Monastero graduated with a bachelor's degree in vocal performance and music education from the University of Michigan in 1956. She obtained her Master of Music degree in Voice and Opera in Florence, Italy in June, 1957, from the Pius XII Institute of Fine Arts at Villa Schifanoia.

In 1962 Fischer Monastero won the Euclid McBride Memorial Scholarship in the finals of the Metropolitan Opera National Council Auditions. That same year she won the American Opera Auditions which enabled her to study opera in Italy. Before leaving for Italy, she attended the Music Academy of the West's summer conservatory. Shortly after she made her European debut at the Teatro Nuovo in Milan in September 1962 as Suzuki in Giacomo Puccini's Madama Butterfly; a role which she repeated that year at the Teatro Comunale Florence.

Fischer Monastero made her debut at the Lyric Opera of Chicago in October 1962 as the Shepherd Boy in Tosca with Régine Crespin in the title role. She appeared in several more roles with the company over the next eight seasons, including Giovanna in Rigoletto with Renata Scotto and Kate Pinkerton in Madama Butterfly among other roles. In 1963 she won the National Federation of Music Clubs' Vocal Competition which led to her invitation to perform at the White House for First Lady Jacqueline Kennedy and other dignitaries with members of the National Symphony Orchestra.

While working at the Lyric Opera of Chicago, Fischer Monastero met her husband, Salvatore Monastero, a Chicago restaurateur. Together with the Monastero family, they founded the Chicago Bel Canto Foundation, an organization which operates an international singing competition whose prize affords winners the opportunities to study opera in Italy. Past teachers associated with the organization include Tito Gobbi, Carlo Bergonzi (tenor), and Renata Tebaldi. The couple have four children.

From 1962 to 1970 she was on the Voice Faculty at the University of Wisconsin-Milwaukee as a part-time teacher. She was a soloist with the Catholic Symphony, sang recitals and appeared on WTMJ-tv with the Milwaukee Symphony Orchestra.

In 1973 Fischer Monastero joined the voice faculty at Northwestern University where she taught for 36 years.
