= Lambert Murphy =

American opera singer (1885–1954)

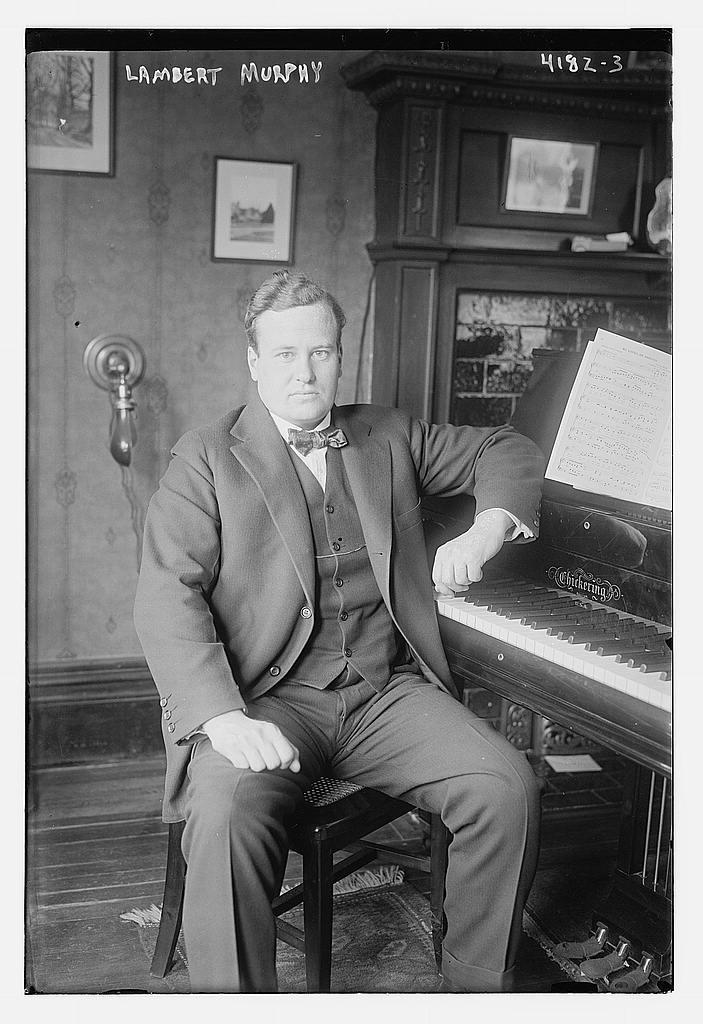
Murphy at his piano in 1917

Harry Lambert Murphy (1 April 15, 1885 – July 25, 1954) was an American operatic tenor.

== Biography ==
He was born as Harry Lambert Murphy in Springfield, Massachusetts on 15 April 1885.

While pursuing an academic course at Harvard University, he studied singing under T. L. Cushman in Boston from 1904 to 1908. He graduated from Harvard in 1908 with his younger brother, Ray D. Murphy (1887–1964) (future chairman of the Equitable Life Assurance Society of the United States 19??–1952), where they were both in the Harvard Glee Club, Harvard Quartet and the Pi Eta Society.

Having filled positions in several important churches in Boston, Brookline, and Fairhaven, he went to New York in 1910 as soloist of St. Bartholomew's Episcopal Church in Manhattan. After further study under Isidore Luckstone, he was engaged in 1911 as a member of the Metropolitan Opera where he appeared in 138 performances until April 1914. Murphy made his reputation chiefly as a concert singer, appearing at many of the great festivals.

Murphy was a popular recording artist for the Victor Talking Machine Company. One well-known recorded hit was "Smiles" from The Passing Show of 1918 and was popular during World War I. Lambert performed and recorded many duets with baritone Reinald Werrenrath. Murphy premiered in the tenor solo role in the quartets in Verdi's Requiem in Boston. After retiring from active concert work, he gave private voice instruction. During World War II he was a product inspector for the Western Electric Company.

Lambert married Margaret Fraser. They had no children. They resided in Keene and Munsonville, New Hampshire, enjoying the outdoors, in particular, hunting and fishing.

Lambert died of throat cancer on July 25, 1954, in Hancock, New Hampshire.
