= Gene Boucher =

American opera singer (1933–1994)

Gene Boucher (December 6, 1933 – January 31, 1994) was an American operatic baritone. His career was chiefly associated with the Metropolitan Opera where he performed annually from 1965 until 1984 in more than 1000 performances in mainly comprimario roles. In 1964 he won the Metropolitan Opera National Council Auditions. In 1966 he created the role of Dolabella in the world premiere of Samuel Barber's Antony and Cleopatra.

== Life and career ==
Born as Eugene Boucher in Bohol, Philippines, Boucher was the son of Inez Boucher and grew up in Jefferson City, Missouri, in the United States. He studied voice and English literature at Westminster College in Missouri, and afterwards pursued further studies in literature in France as a Fulbright Fellow. He then entered the Conservatoire de Lille where he earned a diploma in vocal performance.

Boucher began his professional performance career with the St. Louis Municipal Opera while still a student at Westminster. In 1958 he won the American Opera Auditions, which led to his European debut at the Teatro Nuovo in Milan as the Sacristan in Giacomo Puccini's Tosca in August of that year. In 1962 he was the bass soloist in Johann Sebastian Bach's St John Passion with conductor Robert Shaw and the Robert Shaw Chorale and Orchestra at Carnegie Hall. In 1964 he was the bass soloist in the United States premiere of Marc-Antoine Charpentier's mass Assumpta est Maria with the New York Choral Society and conductor Martin Josman at The Town Hall.

Boucher won the Metropolitan Opera National Council Auditions in 1964. That same year he was awarded 2nd prize in the Walter W. Naumburg Foundation's singing competition.

In June 1965 Boucher made his first appearance with the Metropolitan Opera as Baron Douphol in La traviata at Lewisohn Stadium with Anna Moffo as Violetta and George Schick conducting. The following September he made his first appearance at the Metropolitan Opera House as the Master of Ceremonies in Pyotr Ilyich Tchaikovsky's The Queen of Spades. He appeared in nearly fifty more roles with the Met over the next 20 consecutive seasons, including the Captain in Manon Lescaut, the Commissioner in Madama Butterfly, Count Ceprano in Rigoletto, Dancaïre in Carmen, Fiorello in The Barber of Seville, Fléville in Andrea Chénier, Haly in L'italiana in Algeri, Hermann in The Tales of Hoffmann, Javelinot in Dialogues des Carmélites, Jim Larkens in La fanciulla del West, Marco in Gianni Schicchi, Masetto in Don Giovanni, Ned Keene in Peter Grimes, Pâris in Roméo et Juliette, Ping in Turandot, Schaunard in La bohème, Sciarrone in Tosca, the Shepherd in Pelléas et Mélisande, Silvano in Un ballo in maschera, the Surgeon in La forza del destino, Wagner in Faust, and Zuàne in La Gioconda among others. His final appearance with the company was as the Card Player in Arabella on March 17, 1984.

In addition to his work as a performer. Boucher served as the national executive secretary of the American Guild of Musical Artists, was a panelist for the National Endowment for the Arts, and was on the board of the National Music Council. He also served as a judge for the Metropolitan Opera auditions. He died at his home in Manhattan, aged 60.
