= Hugh Thompson (baritone) =

American opera singer

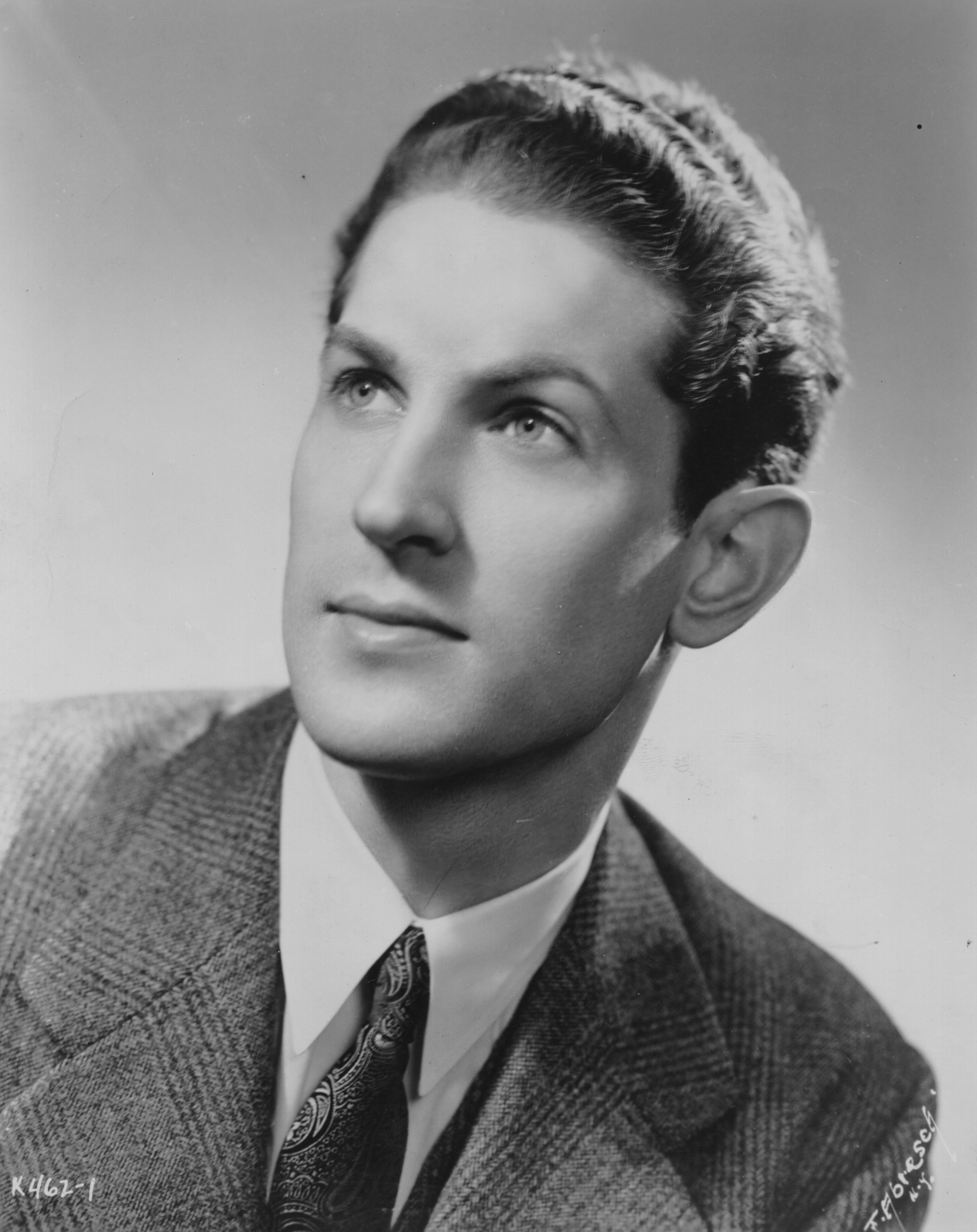
Hugh Thompson

Hugh Roderick Thompson, known on the stage as Hugh Thompson, (June 19, 1915 – February 6, 2006) was an American opera singer. He was a leading baritone at the Metropolitan Opera between 1944 and 1953 for 238 performances. In 1967 he moved to Coral Gables, Florida, joining the Miami Opera Guild as the assistant artistic director, and later taught voice at the University of Miami. He died in Estero, Florida, at the age of 90.

== Early years ==
Thompson was born in Tacoma, Washington, on June 19, 1915. His father was Oscar Thompson, a music critic and author. His grandfather was William Thompson, an author, poet, lawyer, and Olympic archer. Hugh attended the University of Washington and moved to New York City to attend the Juilliard School in 1936. He made his professional debut in 1939, starring in Mozart's The Marriage of Figaro at Chautauqua. In February 1944, Thompson was on the inaugural roster of the fledgling New York City Opera. In December 1944, he won a contract with the Metropolitan Opera via their Auditions of the Air.

== Opera career ==
Thompson made his Met debut in December 1944, as Schaunard in La bohème, a performance that won praise from the music critic of The New York Sun – who was Hugh's father. Thompson played the warden Frank in Garson Kanin's 1950 staging of Die Fledermaus and sang 31 Met performances of the role, the last of which was broadcast on CBS's Omnibus. It was his final performance for the Met. Thompson performed in 238 productions before leaving the Met in 1953. He also worked as a director, staging Figaro in St. Louis in 1955 and La bohème at the Met in 1963.

== Later years ==
In 1967, he moved to Coral Gables, Florida, joining the Miami Opera Guild as the assistant artistic director under director Arturo di Filippi, and later taught voice at the University of Miami and ran their opera workshop until he retired in 1979.

He died of cancer in Estero, Florida, at the age of 90.
