= Edyth Walker =

American opera singer (1867–1950)

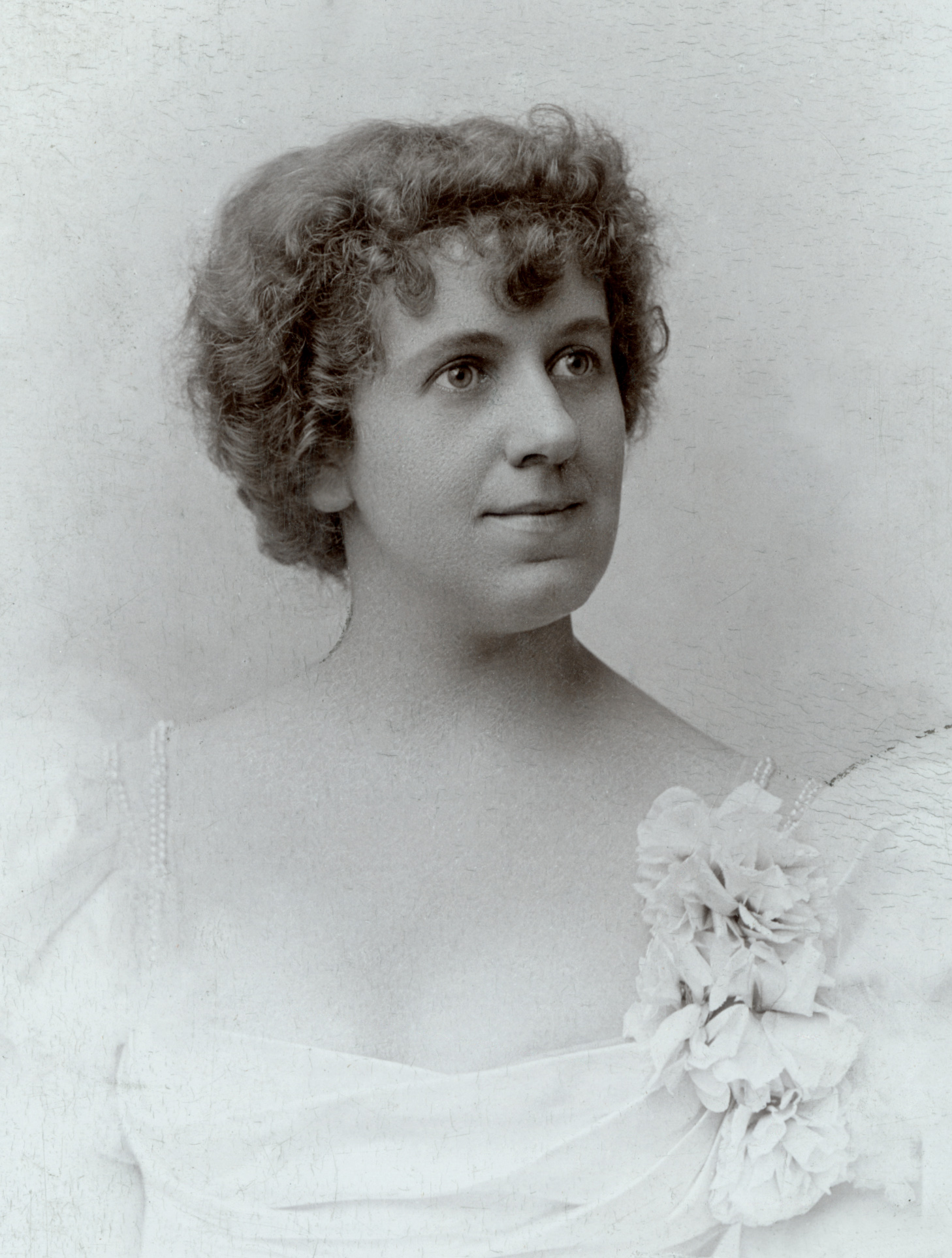
Edyth Walker in Vienna, c. 1895

Edyth Walker (March 27, 1867 – February 19, 1950) was an American opera singer who had an active international career from the 1890s through the 1910s. She began her career performing roles from the mezzo-soprano repertory, but later successfully added several soprano parts to her repertoire as well. She performed in Italian and French language operas, but had a clear affinity for works in the German language. She particularly excelled in the operas of Richard Wagner. After retiring from the stage, she was active as a voice teacher in both France and the United States. Her voice is preserved on several gramophone recordings, made mainly for His Master's Voice, between 1902 and 1908.

== Early life and career ==
Born in Hopewell, New York, Walker had her initial musical training at her church in her native town where she sang in the choir and began performing solos at the age of 14. Her family moved to Rome, New York, where she graduated from Rome Free Academy in 1884 and continued to be active as a soloist at her church. After teaching for several years, she entered and won a singing competition which provided her with a scholarship enabling her to study singing in Europe. She arrived in Dresden, Germany, in 1891 where she became a pupil of Aglaia Orgeni. She later studied singing with Marianne Brandt in Vienna.

Walker made her professional debut as a concert singer at the Gewandhaus in Leipzig in 1892. She made her professional opera debut on 11 November 1894 at the Berlin State Opera as Fidès in Giacomo Meyerbeer's Le prophète. The following year she became a member of the Vienna State Opera where she was a leading mezzo-soprano with the company for eight seasons. She notably sang the role of Magdalena in the Vienna premiere of Wilhelm Kienzl's Der Evangelimann in 1896. She was also much admired in Vienna for her interpretation of the role of Amneris in Giuseppe Verdi's Aida.

While under contract in Vienna, Walker made guest appearances with other European theatres. She made her first appearance in the UK at the Royal Opera House in London, singing the role of Amneris on 16 May 1900. She sang several more roles at Covent Garden in 1900–1901, all of them from the Wagnerian repertoire, including Erda in Siegfried, Fricka in both Die Walküre and Das Rheingold, Ortrud in Lohengrin, and Waltraute in Götterdämmerung. In 1901 she portrayed the role of Elvira in Wolfgang Amadeus Mozart's Don Giovanni at the Salzburg Festival.

== Metropolitan Opera years and later career ==
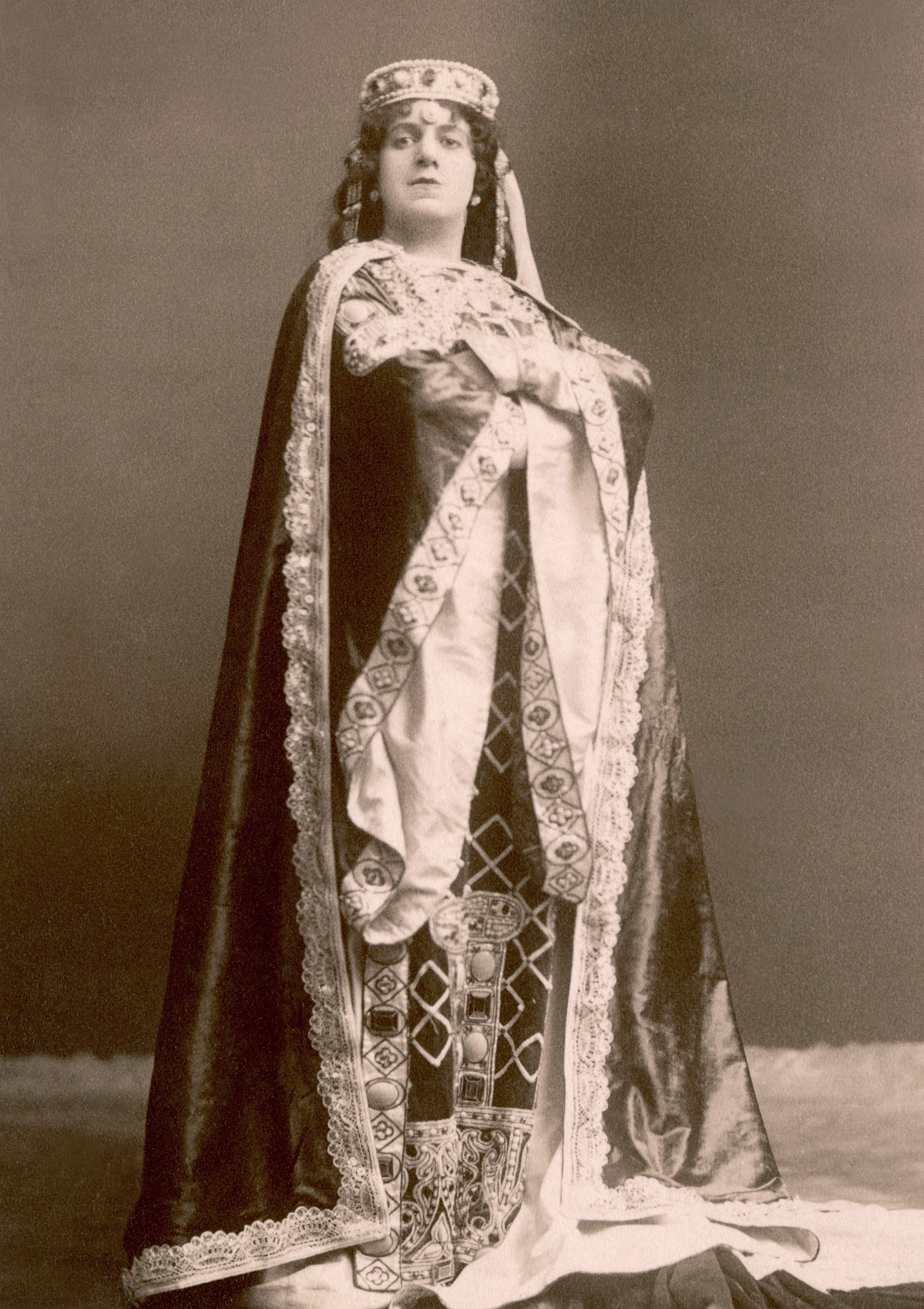
Edyth Walker in New York (c. 1905)

At the close of the 1902–1903 season, Walker left her position in Vienna abruptly after a dispute with Gustav Mahler. Having broken her contract with the influential Vienna opera house, she found it impossible to gain a permanent position with another German or Austrian theatre under such circumstances. She therefore returned to the United States and signed a contract with the Metropolitan Opera of New York City. She made her debut at the Metropolitan Opera House on November 30, 1903 as Amneris to the Aida of Johanna Gadski and the Radamès of Enrico Caruso.

She sang at the Met for three seasons, notably appearing in the Met's first stagings of Gaetano Donizetti's Lucrezia Borgia (as Maffio Orsini) and Johann Strauss II's Die Fledermaus (as Prince Orlofsky). She portrayed mainly mezzo-soprano parts at the Met like Brangäne in Wagner's Tristan und Isolde, Erda, Fricka, La Cieca in Amilcare Ponchielli's La Gioconda, Leonora in La favorita, Nancy in Martha, Ortrud, Siebel in Charles Gounod's Faust, Urbain in Les Huguenots, and Waltraute. Her final and 108th performance with the Metropolitan Opera was in the title role of Karl Goldmark's Die Königin von Saba for an out of town engagement in San Francisco on April 16, 1906.

While on contract with the Met, Walker began adding soprano roles to her repertoire, beginning with Brünnhilde in Die Walküre which she first performed at the Metropolitan Opera House in December 1905. That was the only soprano role she sang on the Met Stage However, after leaving the Met in 1906 to return to Europe, she added more soprano roles to her stage credits. Walker had already been performing periodically as a guest artist with the Hamburg State Opera (HSO) since 1903, and upon her return to Europe she signed a contract with that company. She remained with the HSO through 1912 performing both mezzo and soprano roles. Among the soprano parts she performed there were Isolde in Tristan und Isolde, Kundry in Parsifal, and the title role in Salome.

In 1908 Walker sang the roles of Ortrud and Kundry at the Bayreuth Festival. That same year she had a major triumph as Isolde at Covent Garden. She returned to the Royal Opera House in 1910 to portray the title role in the critically acclaimed UK premiere of Richard Strauss' Elektra under the baton of Sir Thomas Beecham, and to sing the part of Thirza in Ethel Smyth's The Wreckers.

That same year she sang at the wedding of William Ernest, Grand Duke of Saxe-Weimar-Eisenach and Princess Feodora of Saxe-Meiningen. Kaiser Wilhelm II was in attendance and, impressed with her performance, the emperor made a point of having Walker presented to him. From 1912 until 1917 she sang annually at the Munich Festivals with the Bavarian State Opera. She made appearances as a guest artist at the Cologne Opera, La Monnaie and the Prague State Opera, among others. Her final performances were singing various roles in Wagner's The Ring Cycle at Elberfeld in 1918.

== Post singing career ==
After her retirement from the stage, Walker resided in Scheveningen, Holland until 1919 when she moved to Paris. She worked there as a voice teacher where she taught out of a private studio. In 1933 she joined the faculty at the American Conservatory in Fontainebleau where she taught through 1936. She then moved back to New York City where she continued to teach until her death 14 years later. Among her notable pupils were Irene Dalis and Blanche Thebom. She died at her home in New York City in 1950 at the age of 82 after a brief illness.
