= Ada Soder-Hueck =

American contralto singer

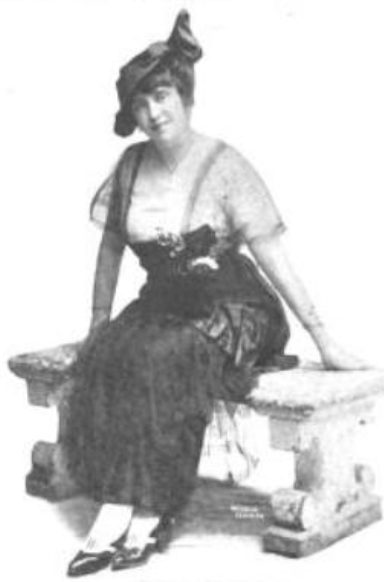
- Ada Soder-Hueck, from a 1915 publication
- Born: 1874; Amsterdam or Berlin
- Died: January 8, 1936; New York City
- Occupation(s): Singer, voice teacher

Ada Soder-Hueck (1874 – January 8, 1936) was a European-born American contralto singer and voice teacher.

== Early life ==
Ada Soder-Hueck was born in Amsterdam or Berlin (sources vary). She studied piano as a child, and later voice with contralto Marianne Brandt in Berlin and Vienna. In 1903 she spent six months studying in Berlin with Lilli Lehmann.

== Career ==
Soder-Hueck, a dramatic contralto of "remarkable vocal quality", sang with the Vienna Opera. She was an established singer in St. Louis, Missouri by 1902, and performed at the St. Louis World's Fair in 1904. She sang with the New York Symphony.

Soder-Hueck taught voice according to the Manuel Garcia method, from a studio in the Metropolitan Opera House building, from 1910 until her death in 1936. She attended the 1915 New York State Music Teachers' Association Convention. Her students included several working vocalists, some of whom were church soloists, radio performers, touring concert singers, and a cantor.

== Personal life ==
She had a son, Frederick, born in 1898. She died in 1936, aged 62 years, from a stroke, in New York City.
