= American Opera Auditions =

The American Opera Auditions was a non-profit organization located in Cincinnati, Ohio, that organized an annual singing contest in both the United States and Italy from 1956 to 1990. The organization was founded by Cincinnati businessman and philanthropist John L. Magro.

Winners of the American Opera Auditions from the United States were afforded the opportunity to study singing in Italy and make their professional European opera debuts at notable Italian opera houses. The Italian winners were afforded the opportunity to study singing in the United States and make their US debut with the Cincinnati Opera during its summer season. Notable winners of the competition include Sharon Azrieli, Gene Boucher, Dominic Cossa, James King, John Modinos, Elizabeth Fischer Monastero, Karen Holvik, Sherrill Milnes, Seymour Schwartzman, George Shirley and Carol Toscano.
