= Harold Aks =

American conductor and music educator

Harold Aks (November 1, 1921, Yonkers, New York – June 30, 2000, Canada) was an American conductor and music educator. He founded the Dorian Chorale, a professional chorus based in Manhattan, and also conducted several notable community choruses in New York City like the Interracial Fellowship Chorus. Harold Aks was married to Patricia Aks, a writer of young adult books. His brothers-in-law were humorist Sam Levenson and artist Michael Lenson. Harold's sister, Esther Ray was an award winning painter herself.

Aks studied music at Brooklyn College until World War II interrupted his education, and he became a weatherman for the Army Air Corps in India. After the war he entered the Juilliard School, where he studied choral conducting with Pierre Monteux and Robert Shaw. He graduated from Juilliard with a Bachelor of Music in conducting in 1948. He then joined the staff of the Dalton School in 1949, where he taught music and conducted choirs for almost 50 years. He simultaneously taught on the faculty of Sarah Lawrence College from 1954 to 1992.

He died in 2000 in Canada at the age of 78.
