= Mathilde Bauermeister =

German opera singer

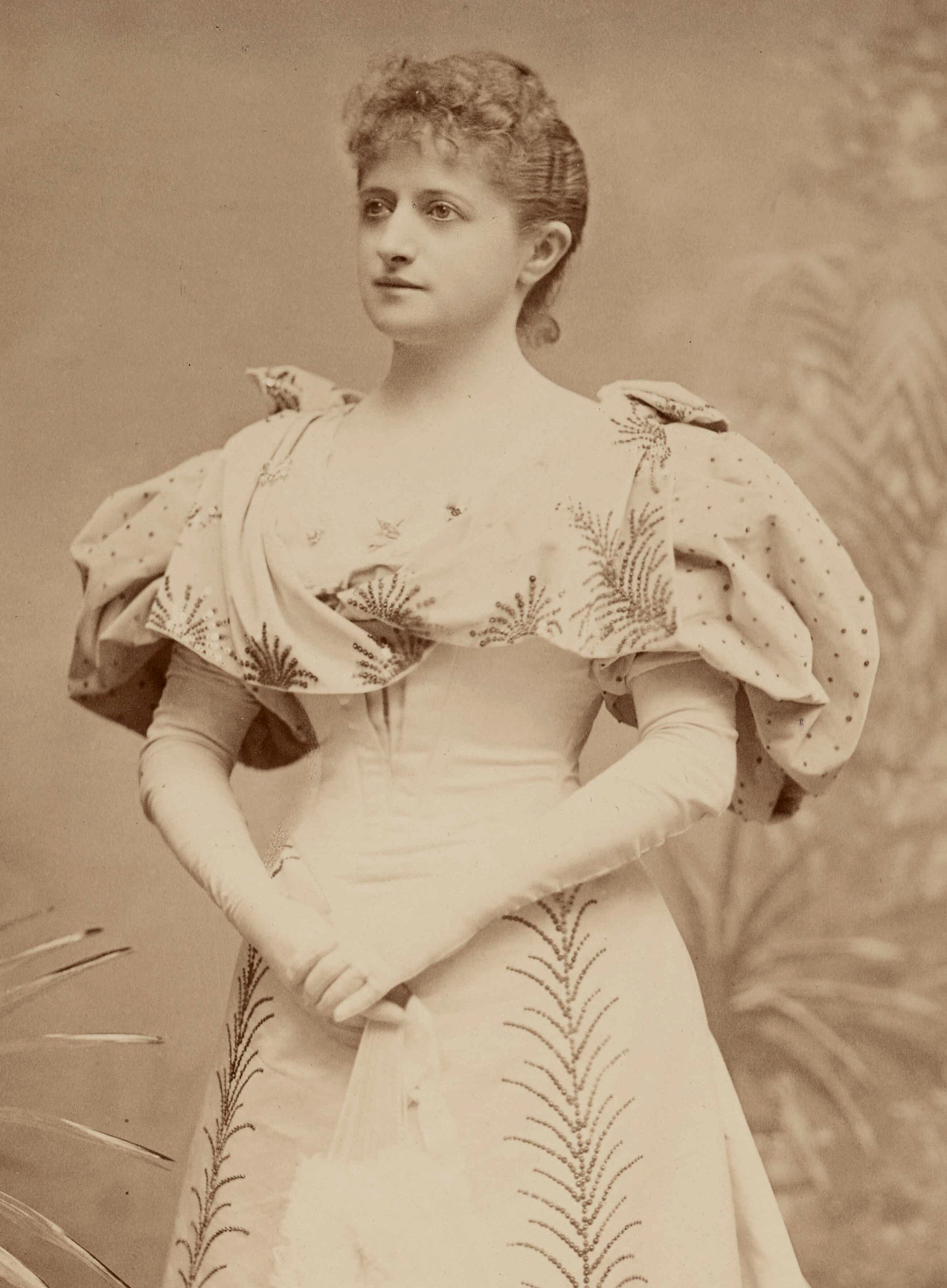
- Born: 1849; Hamburg, Germany
- Died: 15 October 1926 (aged 76–77); Herne Bay, England
- Occupation: Opera singer

Mathilde Bauermeister (1849 – 15 October 1926) was an opera singer (soprano/mezzo-soprano) who for decades held the record for most performances by a female artist at the Metropolitan Opera, a record now held by Thelma Votipka.

== Biography ==
Bauermeister was born in Hamburg, Germany. She made her Metropolitan debut on 11 November 1891, as Amore in Gluck's Orfeo ed Euridice. She specialized in comprimario roles. Her most frequent performances at the Met were as Marthe in Gounod's Faust (199 performances), Frasquita in Bizet's Carmen (144), Lady of Honor in Meyerbeer's Les Huguenots (100), Gertrude in Gounod's Roméo et Juliette (98), and Mamma Lucia in Mascagni's Cavalleria rusticana (97). These roles account for well over half of her 1,062 performances at the Met. She sang the role of Giovanna in Verdi's Rigoletto 44 times, including on the occasion of Enrico Caruso's debut with the Met.

Roles she was the first to perform at the Met include Mamma Lucia, Poussette in Massenet's Manon, Inés in Donizetti's La Favorita, and Giovanna in Verdi's Ernani.

Her last performance at the Met, on 17 March 1906, was as Berta in a matinee performance that included Act II of Rossini's The Barber of Seville.

She died in Herne Bay, Kent, England on 15 October 1926.
