= Marianne Brandt (contralto) =

Austrian contralto (1842–1921)

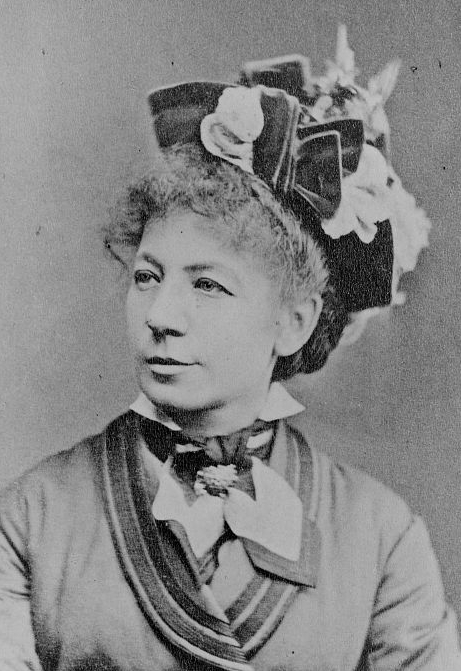
Marianne Brandt, between 1880 and 1890

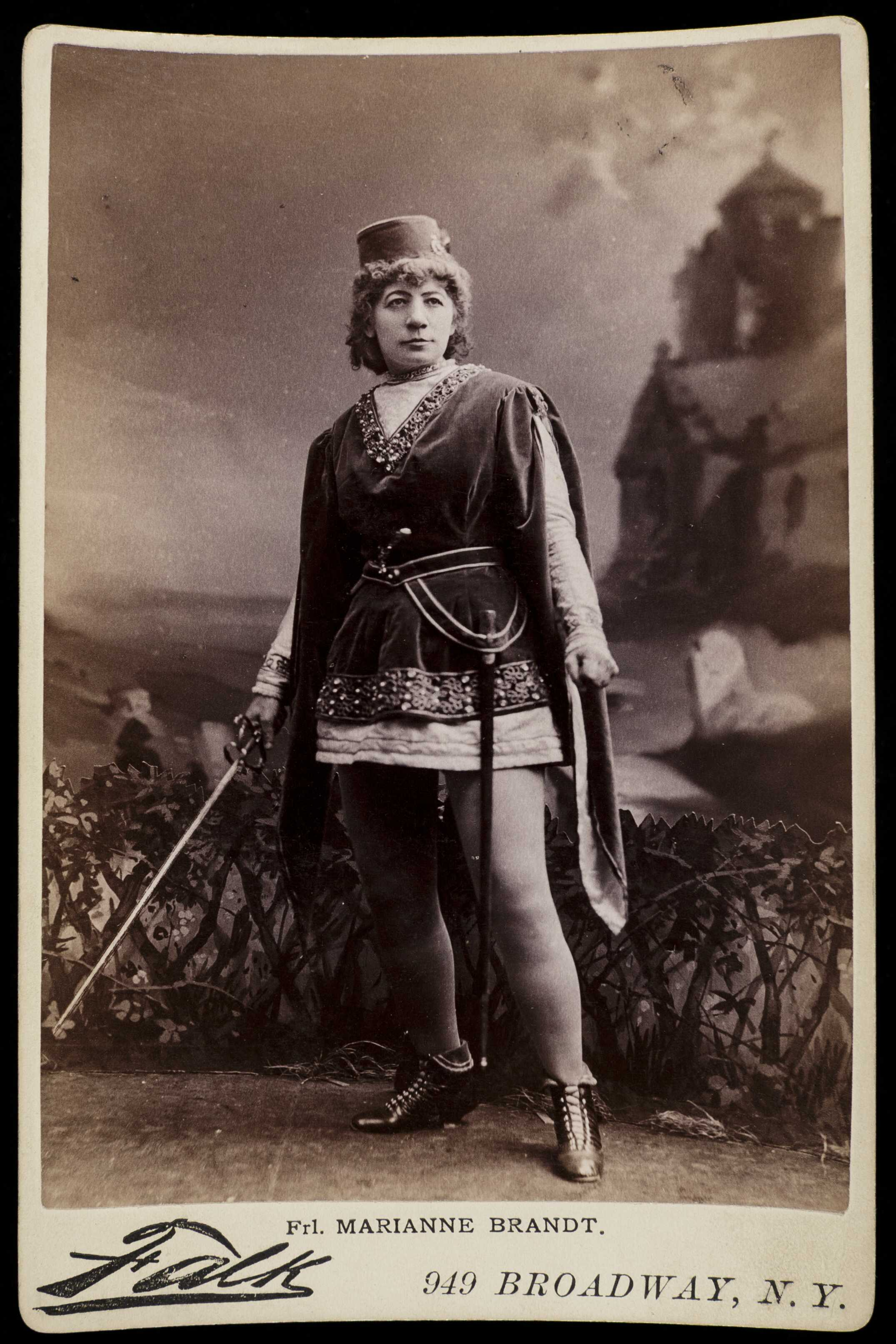
Brandt as Adriano in Rienzi, 1886 (photo by Benjamin Falk; Newberry Library, Chicago)

Marianne Brandt (12 September 1842 – 9 July 1921) was an Austrian operatic singer with an international reputation.

She was born as Marie Bischof in Vienna and was educated at the music conservatory in that city, then studied with Pauline Viardot-García. She first attracted attention on stage in 1867 as Rachel in La Juive and soon afterward accepted an engagement at the Graz opera. From 1868 to 1886, she was associated with the Royal Opera in Berlin. Brandt travelled to New York during the 1880s, where she sang for several seasons (1884–1888) the principal contralto rôles at the Metropolitan Opera House under Anton Seidl's baton. Two other leading Germanic singers, the soprano Lilli Lehmann and the bass-baritone Emil Fischer, were performing at the Met at the same time as Brandt. Her associate artist for her 1887 tour was the pianist Carl Lachmund.

She returned to Vienna in 1890, working as a singing teacher and in concert performances. She died in 1921, aged 78, in Vienna and was buried in the Hadersdorf-Weidlingau cemetery in Penzing.

Gifted with a rich contralto/mezzo-soprano voice of extraordinary compass and possessing exceptional histrionic gifts, Brandt was regarded, in her prime, as being one of the greatest German operatic vocalists of the 19th century. As an admirable interpreter of Wagnerian rôles, she contributed largely to the success of the Bayreuth music festivals in 1876 and 1882. In 1890 she took up residence in Vienna as a vocal teacher. Her pupils included Edyth Walker and Ada Soder-Hueck. Her voice can be heard on a few Pathé recordings which she made during the early 1900s while in semi-retirement; these are available on CD re-issues.
