= Thelma Votipka =

American opera singer

Thelma Votipka (December 20, 1906 – October 24, 1972) was an American soprano who sang 1,422 performances with the Metropolitan Opera, more than any other woman in the company's history (her nearest rival, Mathilde Bauermeister, sang 1,062).

Votipka was born in Cleveland, Ohio, and educated at Oberlin College. She specialized in comprimario roles. She also studied in New York City with Anna Eugénie Schoen-René, a student of Pauline Viardot-Garcia and Manuel Garcia.

She was a member of Vladimir Rosing's American Opera Company in the late 1920s and made her debut as the Countess in The Marriage of Figaro on December 14, 1927, in Washington D.C. She made her Metropolitan debut on December 16, 1935, as Flora in Verdi's La traviata, a role she sang 101 times with the company.

Other frequent roles with the Met included Giovanna in Verdi's Rigoletto (139 performances), Marthe in Gounod's Faust (128), Alisa in Donizetti's Lucia di Lammermoor (116), Frasquita in Bizet's Carmen (112), Marianne in Strauss's Der Rosenkavalier (109), the Priestess in Verdi's Aida (101), Gerhilde in Wagner's Die Walküre (93), and Mamma Lucia in Mascagni's Cavalleria rusticana (72). Mamma Lucia was the role of her final performance, in Dallas, on May 11, 1963.

Votipka shared the stage with many artists on the occasions of their Metropolitan debuts: Marjorie Lawrence, Zinka Milanov, Rose Pauly, Eleanor Steber, Astrid Varnay, Robert Merrill, Victoria de los Ángeles, Hilde Gueden, Charles Anthony, Mattiwilda Dobbs, Nicolai Gedda, and Joan Sutherland.

She returned to the Met on April 16, 1966, to sing in the quintet from Carmen as part of the gala farewell performance at the opera house at Broadway and 39th Street. She died in New York in 1972, aged 65.
