= Dominic Cossa =

American opera singer (1935–2024)

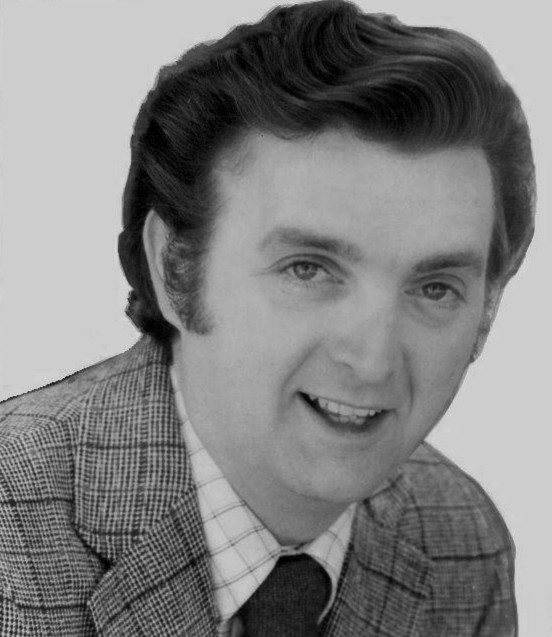
- Cossa in 1970
- Born: May 13, 1935; Jessup, Pennsylvania, U.S.
- Died: October 6, 2024 (aged 89)
- Occupation: Operatic lyric baritone

Dominic Frank Cossa (May 13, 1935 – October 6, 2024) was an American operatic lyric baritone particularly associated with the Italian and French repertoire.

== Biography ==
Cossa was born in Jessup, Pennsylvania, on May 13, 1935. He studied with Anthony Marlowe in Detroit, Michigan, Robert Weede in Concord, California, and Armen Boyajian in New York City. He made his debut at the New York City Opera as Moralès in 1961, and a week later sang Sharpless with the company. He won the American Opera Auditions in 1964 and was sent to Italy for debuts at the Teatro Nuovo in Milan and Teatro della Pergola in Florence.

He made his debut at the San Francisco Opera in 1967 as Zurga in Les pêcheurs de perles. His Metropolitan Opera debut took place on January 30, 1970, as Silvio in Pagliacci. Other roles there were Figaro in Il barbiere di Siviglia, Lescaut in Manon Lescaut, Marcello in La bohème, Mercutio in Roméo et Juliette, Masetto in Don Giovanni, Valentin in Faust, Yeletsky in Pique Dame, Germont in La traviata, and Albert in Werther. In 1976 he created the role of David Murphy in the world premiere of Gian Carlo Menotti's The Hero with the Opera Company of Philadelphia.

Cossa's left a few notable recordings of his best roles such as Belcore in L'elisir d'amore opposite Dame Joan Sutherland and Luciano Pavarotti, Achillas in Handel's Giulio Cesare opposite Norman Treigle and Beverly Sills, Nevers in Meyerbeer's Les Huguenots, again opposite Sutherland, Martina Arroyo and Huguette Tourangeau, and the baritone solo part in Roger Sessions' When Lilacs Last in the Dooryard Bloom'd. He can also be heard on the Classical Record Library's A Celebration of Schumann and Schubert with the Chamber Music Society of Lincoln Center.

He sang as soloist with the New York Philharmonic, the Boston Symphony, the Chicago Symphony, the Israel Philharmonic, and the National Symphony.

He was chosen by Licia Albanese to be the recipient of the Puccini Foundation's Baccarat Award in 2004, and in 1993 was inducted into the Hall of Fame for Great American Singers at the Academy of Vocal Arts in Philadelphia.

Cossa taught at the Manhattan School of Music and in 1988 he accepted a position as Professor of Music at the University of Maryland, College Park, where he became chair of Voice/Opera.

He was a National Patron of Delta Omicron, an international professional music fraternity.

Cossa died on October 6, 2024, at the age of 89.

== Sources ==
- Bender, William. "Music: Souvenir Opera", Time (June 14, 1976)
- Central Opera Service Bulletin. "Winners of Vocal Competitions" (May–June 1966)
- Hamilton, David (ed.) "Cossa, Dominic", The Metropolitan Opera Encyclopedia. Simon and Schuster (1987) ISBN 0-671-61732-X
- The New York Times, "4 American Opera Singers Have Debut in Milan" (September 21, 1962)
- University of Maryland School of Music. Faculty biography: Dominic Cossa
