= Liceo musicale e coreutico =

- Italy

Information
- Type: Secondary school
- Grades: 9–13 (ages 14–19)

Liceo musicale e coreutico (literally "musical and choreutic lyceum") is a type of secondary school in Italy. It is specifically devoted to music and dance related topics. Students can attend the liceo musicale e coreutico after successfully completing scuola media (middle school).

The curriculum is devised by the Ministry of Education, and emphasises the link between art, music, and dance. It covers a complete and widespread range of disciplines.

Students typically study for five years, and attend the school from the age of 14 to 19. At the end of the fifth year all students sit for the esame di Stato ("state exam"), a final examination which gave access to every university course.

A student attending a liceo is called "liceale", although the more generic terms studente (male) and studentessa (female) are also in common use. Teachers are known as professore (male) or professoressa (female).

== See also ==
- List of schools in Italy
