= Richard Vernon (bass) =

American opera singer

Richard Vernon (Memphis, Tennessee, May 9, 1953 – Shohola, Pennsylvania, December 2, 2006) was an American operatic bass who is chiefly remembered for his nearly 800 performances with the Metropolitan Opera from 1981 until his death in 2006 at the age of 53. Mainly a performer of comprimario roles, his voice is preserved on several recordings made for Live from the Metropolitan Opera and the Metropolitan Opera radio broadcasts.

== Life and career ==
Born in Memphis, Tennessee, Vernon earned a Bachelor of Music in vocal performance from the University of Memphis before becoming a member of the Young Artist program at the Houston Grand Opera from 1977 to 1979. He made his professional opera debut with Opera Memphis in 1973 while still an undergraduate student, singing Pimen in Boris Godunov. In 1977 he was a finalist in the Metropolitan Opera National Council Auditions.

On February 20, 1981, Vernon made his debut at the Metropolitan Opera as one of the animals in the Met's first performance of Ravel's L'enfant et les sortilèges which was paired with two other French works under the title Parade. He performed in several other Met premieres, including a solo voice in Moses und Aron (1999), Gravis in Doktor Faust (2001), the Tall Englishman in The Gambler (2001), the Staff Officer in War and Peace (2002), and the Sommelier in Sly (2002). Other roles he performed at the Met included both Arkel and the Shepherd in Pelléas et Mélisande, both Banquo and the Physician in Macbeth, the Captain in Eugene Onegin, Colline in La bohème, the Commendatore in Don Giovanni, the Commissioner in Madama Butterfly, Conte Vaudemont in I vespri siciliani, Count Ceprano in Rigoletto, Dr. Grenvil in La traviata, the Duke of Verona in Roméo et Juliette, Fafner in Siegfried, Ferrando in Il trovatore, Foltz in Die Meistersinger von Nürnberg, the Friar in Don Carlo, the Guardian in Elektra, a Guard in The Magic Flute, Handsome in La fanciulla del West, Jago in Ernani, Joseph in The Ghosts of Versailles, the King of Egypt in Aida, Lackey in Ariadne auf Naxos, Lido Boatman in Death in Venice, the Marquis de Calatrava in La forza del destino, Mercury in Les Troyens, One-Armed in Die Frau ohne Schatten, the Police Commissioner in Der Rosenkavalier, Reinmar in Tannhäuser, Schmidt in Andrea Chénier, the Second Knight in Parsifal, a Sergeant in Manon Lescaut, a Soldier in Salome, Tom in Un ballo in maschera, Varsonofiev in Khovanshchina, and Wurm in Luisa Miller among others. His final and 796th performance at the Met was on November 28, 2006, as Sciarrone in Tosca.

Outside of the Met, Vernon appeared as a guest artist with several American opera companies; including the Cincinnati Opera, the San Diego Opera, and the Washington National Opera among others. In 1985 he made his debut at the San Francisco Opera as the Prince de Bouillon in Adriana Lecouvreur. He also was active on the concert stage with orchestras in the United States and abroad, including cities in China, Japan, and the Philippines among other Asian countries.
