= Pablo Elvira =

Puerto Rican opera singer

Pablo Elvira (September 24, 1937 – February 5, 2000) was a Puerto Rican baritone. He performed with the New York City Opera and the Metropolitan Opera, and he was a strong supporter of opera in the state of Montana, where he co-founded the Intermountain Opera in Bozeman.

== Life ==
Elvira was born on September 24, 1937, in San Juan, Puerto Rico, Puerto Rico. He began his musical career playing jazz trumpet there, with his uncle, Rafael Elvira, in his orchestra, he continued in his father's band and later started his own band who played at the Hotel San Juan. In 1966, he joined the voice faculty of the Indiana University School of Music; during his eight years there he performed baritone roles in many of the school's opera productions.

In 1974, Elvira made his first appearance with the New York City Opera. He debuted at the Metropolitan Opera in 1978 and performed there over 100 times during the next 12 years in works by Rossini, Donizetti, Verdi, Puccini, Berlioz and Leoncavallo. Elvira was a strong supporter of opera in the state of Montana. With Anthony Stivanello and Joe Bostick, he co-founded the Intermountain Opera Association of Montana in Bozeman, Montana, in 1979.

Elvira married Signe Landoe in 1975, and they moved to Bozeman, Montana, one year later. They had a son, Pablo. Elvira died on February 5, 2000, in Bozeman, Montana. He's ashes were deposited in a niche in the San Vicente de Paul Parish in San Juan, Puerto Rico.

== Discography ==
- Casals: El Pessebre (Iglesias, Forrester; Casals; 1974) COL
- Montemezzi: L'amore dei tre re (Moffo, Domingo, Siepi; Santi, 1976) RCA
- Mascagni: Cavalleria rusticana (Scotto, Domingo; Levine, 1978) RCA

=== Videos ===
- Puccini: Manon Lescaut (Scotto, Domingo; Levine, Menotti, 1980) [live]
- Donizetti: Lucia di Lammermoor (Sutherland, Kraus, Plishka; Bonynge, Donnell, 1982) [live]
