= Leslie Chabay =

Hungarian opera singer (1907–1989)

- Csabay László
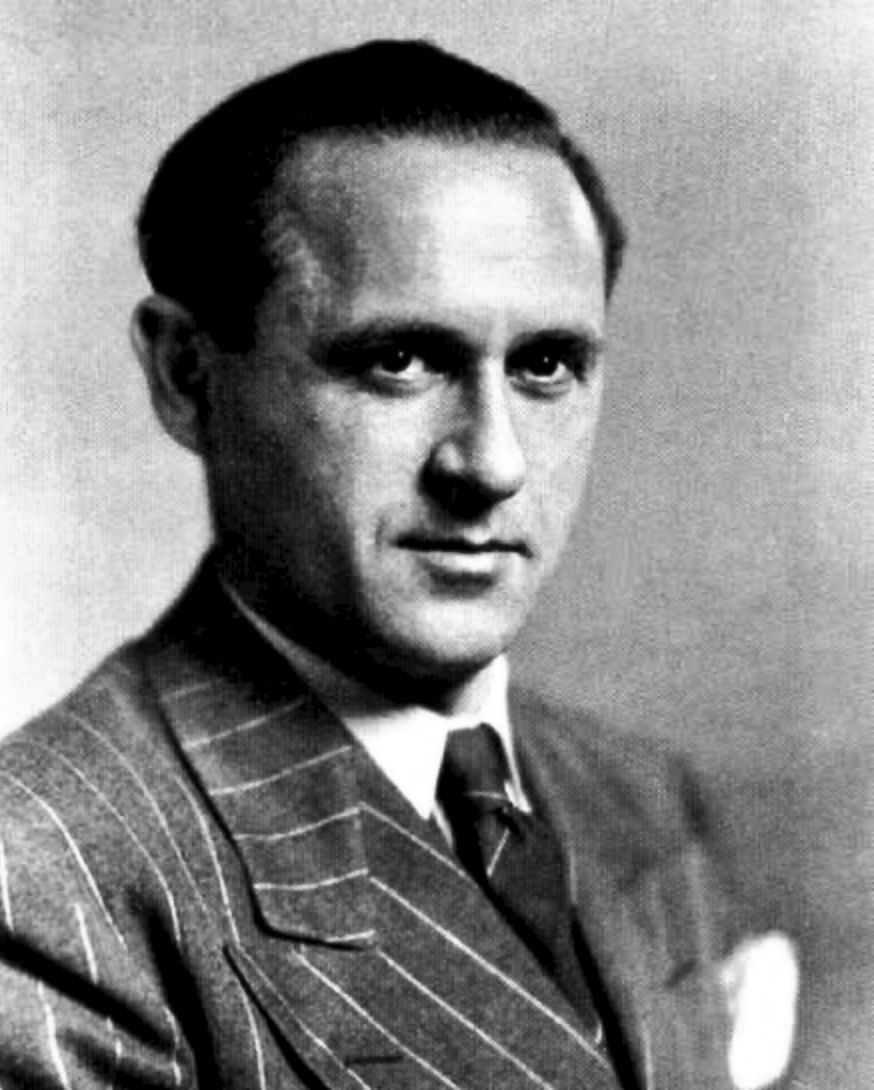
- Born: 31 December 1907; Békéscsaba, Hungary
- Died: 16 March 1989 (aged 81); Sarasota, Florida
- Occupations: Tenor opera singer, professor of music
- Years active: 1932–1977

Leslie Chabay (Hungarian: Csabay László) (31 December 1907 – 16 March 1989) was a Hungarian-born tenor. He toured Germany, Belgium and Estonia from 1933 to 1935 as a member of the Deutsche Musikbühne traveling opera company, then joined the Deutsches Theater Brno from 1933 to 1935 and the Volksoper Budapest from 1935 to 1938.

In 1937 he joined the Salzburg Opera Guild tour of North America, performing Mozart's Così fan tutte in more than 30 cities. He immigrated to the United States in 1946 to join the Metropolitan Opera in New York City. He sang at the Met until the end of the 1950–51 season and then became a recitalist and concert soloist. He also served as professor of music at Washington University in St. Louis from 1955 to 1977, and appeared regularly at the Aspen (Colorado) Music Festival.
