= Josef Hopferwieser =

Austrian opera tenor (1938–2015)

Josef Hopferwieser (25 May 1938 – 9 July 2015) was an Austrian operatic tenor.

== Life ==
Born in Graz, Hopferwieser came from a musical family. His father Josef Hopferwieser (1907–1999) was an organ builder there. Hopferwieser began playing the piano at an early age, and he liked to sing. But he came to singing as a profession more by chance. He first completed training as a painter and varnisher in the motor-vehicle sector and ran his own workshop in Graz. After the Graz Academy was opened in 1960, he received his vocal training there from the age of eighteen or nineteen with the soprano Herma Handl. He studied at the Graz Academy for about a year as an extraordinary pupil alongside his actual profession. On the advice of his teacher, Hopferwieser went to an audition at a Viennese artist agency. There, he was discovered by the then Braunschweig theatre directors Heribert Esser and Hellmuth Matiasek, and was immediately engaged as a lyric tenor in Braunschweig.

In 1964, he made his professional debut as an opera singer at the Staatstheater Braunschweig with the role of Count Almaviva in The Barber of Seville. Further roles in his Braunschweig time were Fenton in Falstaff, Don Ottavio, the Duke of Urbino in the operetta Eine Nacht in Venedig as well as the two buffo roles Brighella and Tanzmeister in Ariadne auf Naxos. Further engagements followed, two years at the Aalto Theatre in Essen (1967–1969), and then four at the Oper Frankfurt (1969–1973), where he gradually took over the youthful Heldentenor parts alongside lyrical roles such as Lindoro in L'italiana in Algeri (alongside Agnes Baltsa). In Frankfurt he sang roles such as Alwa in Lulu (with Anja Silja in the title role and conductor Christoph von Dohnányi), the title role in The Tales of Hoffmann, Tom Rakewell in The Rake's Progress, the title role in Faust (with Júlia Várady; stage director: Bohumil Herlischka) and Don José in Carmen (1973; stage director: Jean-Pierre Ponnelle), as well as some parts of the Italian repertoire, like the title role in Don Carlos and Riccardo in Un ballo in maschera. In Frankfurt, Hopferwieser finally made the permanent change from lyric tenor to young Heldentenor.

In October 1970, he made his debut at the Vienna State Opera in the title role in The Tales of Hoffmann. In the summer of 1972 he gave a guest performance at the Seefestspiele Mörbisch as the Duke in Eine Nacht in Venedig. In May 1973, according to other sources, with the beginning of the 1973–74 season he became a permanent member of the ensemble there. He constantly had about fifteen to twenty roles in his repertoire there, concentrating in particular on the composers Richard Wagner and Richard Strauss. He belonged to the Vienna State Opera without interruption until his retirement in 1998. He sang over thirty different roles in a total of 472 performances at the Vienna State Opera.

To his roles at the Vienna State Opera belonged, among others, Erik in Der fliegende Holländer, Walther von Stolzing in Die Meistersinger von Nürnberg, Narraboth, Matteo in Arabella (with Gundula Janowitz in the title role), later also Herodes in Salome (first in summer of 1993 in Vienna), Aegisth in Elektra, Bacchus in Ariadne auf Naxos, Count Elemer in Arabella, Wirt in Der Rosenkavalier, Steva in Jenůfa and Der Kavalier in Cardillac. In more than sixty performances he interpreted the singing teacher Alfred in the operetta Die Fledermaus. In the third act he satirized his own image as a heroic tenor by singing excerpts from Wagner's operas. In April 1998 Hopferwieser sang his last performances at the Vienna State Opera: Herod and, as the last part, the first Geharnischten in Mozart's The Magic Flute. In Vienna he also sang regularly at the Wiener Volksoper. In September 1973 he sang there, with Renate Holm as Marie, Hans in the opera The Bartered Bride as part of the reopening of the newly renovated Volksoper. In 1975 he sang the officer Phoebus in the rarely performed, late romantic Franz Schmidt opera Notre Dame at the Vienna Volksoper.

On 26 September 1989 he was awarded the professional title "Austrian Kammersänger".

In the 1979–80 season he made a guest appearance as Matteo in Arabella (December 1979) as part of the so-called "Festive Opera Evenings" at the Nationaltheater Mannheim; in doing so he "not only made a good tenoral figure, but also sang in an exemplary manner". In the 1980–81 season he sang the role of Admète in Alceste. In the 1981–82 season at the Stadttheater Gießen he sang Erik in a Holländer new production (premiere: April 1982). In the 1982–83 season he gave a guest performance on Opernhaus Kiel with the role of Walter von Stolzing (premiere: October 1982; conductor: Werner Saladin); he approached his role with "promising, somewhat baritonally colored material, which possesses particularly in the forte and in the high luminosity, in the mezzo-forte in the middle position sometimes slightly roughened, which has a slightly roughened effect". In October 1983 he made a guest appearance at the Badisches Staatstheater Karlsruhe in a concert performance of Wagner's early work Die Feen; he sang the part of Arindal. In July 1985 he sang the Emperor in Strauss' opera Die Frau ohne Schatten in Karlsruhe. In the 1985–86 season, he gave a guest performance at the Staatstheater Mainz in the title role in Tannhäuser.

Hopferwieser also gave several guest performances at the Bayerische Staatsoper, among others as Kavalier in Cardillac (premiere season 1982–83; resumption season 1984–85) and 1987 as Froh in Das Rheingold, as well as there again and again, among others also in January 1984, as Alfred in Die Fledermaus. In 1986 he sang the part of Menelaus in the premiere of the opera Troades by Aribert Reimann in Munich and also took part in the recording of this work. He also appeared several times at the Deutsche Oper Berlin. At the beginning of the 1980–81 season he sang Bacchus in Ariadne auf Naxos, in March 1986 Walther von Stolzing; furthermore he was a guest Drum-major in Wozzeck, with Karan Armstrong as Marie.

He also gave guest performances at the Staatsoper Stuttgart, at the Hamburgische Staatsoper (among others in December 1984 as Count Elemer in the last Arabella performance series of the staging by Otto Schenk) and several times at the Deutsche Oper am Rhein (as Don José, among others). In May 1989, together with the Ensemble der Deutschen Oper, he gave a guest performance at the International May Festival at the Staatstheater Wiesbaden "with a good singing performance" as Tichon in Káťa Kabanová. In February 1992 he made his role debut at the Staatstheater Braunschweig as Hermann in The Queen of Spades.

In 1971 he appeared at the San Francisco Opera as Alwa in Lulu. The role belonged to the parts he sang very often. He also embodied Alwa at the Grand Théâtre de Genève (1986) and in Madrid (1988). He sang abroad at La Scala, at the Teatro dell'Opera di Roma and at the opera houses in Lyon and Nancy. As a concert singer he appeared among others in Verdi's Requiem; at a performance in March 1980 with the Bruckner Orchestra Linz he performed the tenor part "to the best of his satisfaction".

At the Scala, Hopferwieser was heard as Andres in Wozzeck (also with Ticho Parly and Mirto Picchi in the cast, conducted by Claudio Abbado, 1971) and in Cardillac (with Sir Donald McIntyre in the name part, directed by Ponnelle, 1987).

Hopferwieser was married for over fifty years and father of two children. He died at age seventy-seven after a short illness in his hometown Graz, where he also lived.

== Recordings ==
Hopferwieser's voice is documented by several complete opera recordings, radio recordings and various live recordings. However, studio recordings with Hopferwieser are rare. In 1976, Decca Records recorded the two-act version of the opera Lulu in which Hopferwieser sings the part of Alwa. His partner is Silja; the conductor was Dohnányi. In 1991, Naxos recorded the operetta Die Fledermaus, in which John Dickie and Gabriele Fontana were his partners.

In 1975 a live recording of the opera Notre Dame from the Vienna Volksoper was released by the label MRF. In 1981 the Polish label Muza released a live recording of the opera Fidelio in which Hopferwieser sings the part of Florestan. The performance was recorded in Warsaw in 1979, and released on 3 LPs. On video a live recording of 1987 from the Bayerische Staatsoper was published, with Hopferwieser as Alfred in Die Fledermaus, with Pamela Coburn and Janet Perry, conducted by Carlos Kleiber. Opera Depot published his live 1973 Carmen (in German translation) on Compact Discs, with Silja and Dohnányi.
