= Ruggero Galli =

Italian opera singer

Ruggero Galli was an Italian operatic bass who had an active career during the late 19th and early 20th century. He created roles in several world premieres, including Menico in Antonio Smareglia's Nozze istriane (1895), Cesare Angelotti in Giacomo Puccini's Tosca (1900), and Pantalone De' Bisognosi in Pietro Mascagni's Le maschere (1901). In 1897, he portrayed Schaunard in La Scala's first staging of La bohème. He also appeared in the 1915 Italian film La reginetta delle rose.
