= Svetla Vassileva (soprano) =

Bulgarian opera singer (born 1965)

- Светла Василева
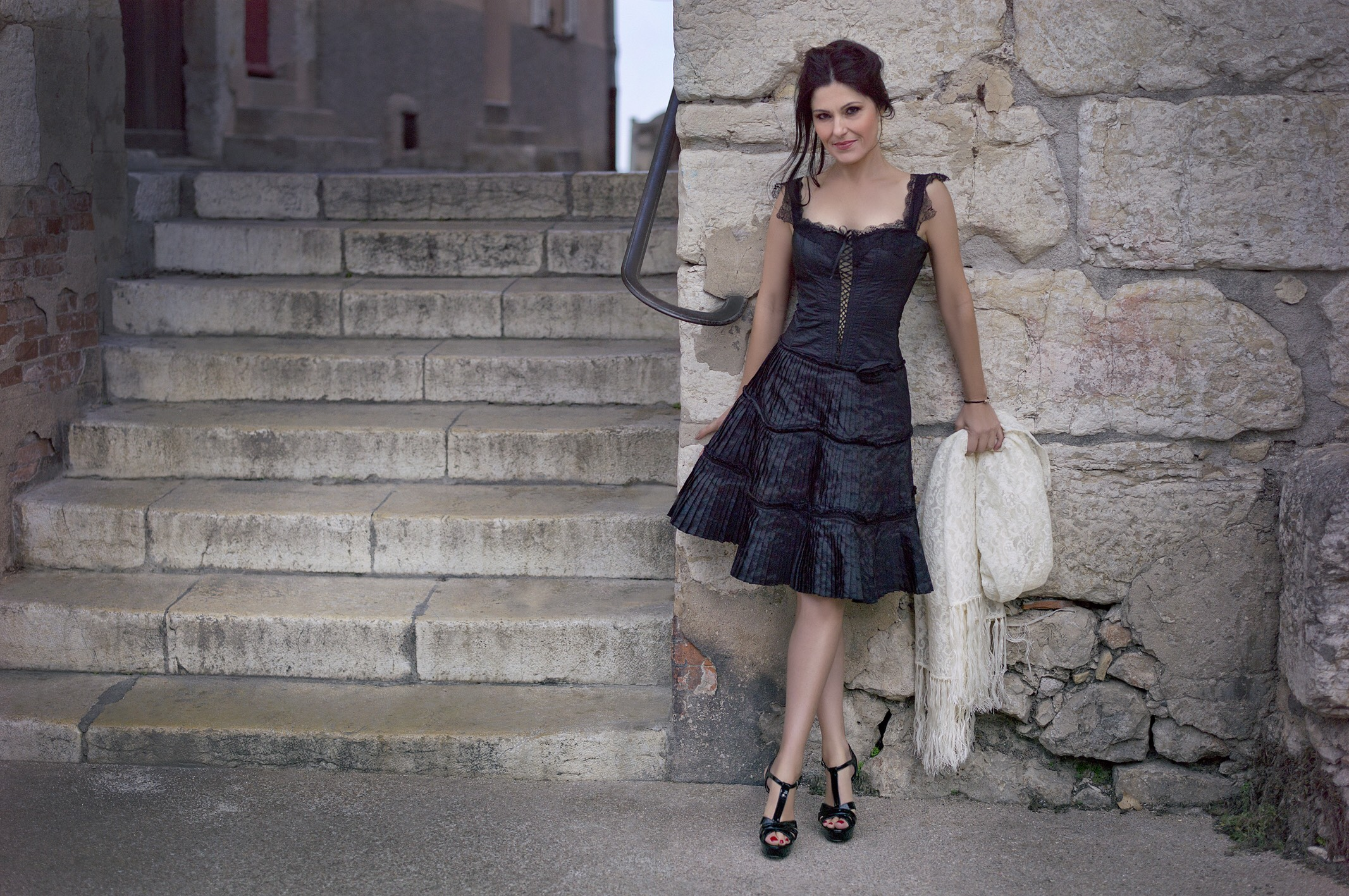
- Svetla Vassileva
- Born: 9 September 1965 (age 60); Dobrich, People's Republic of Bulgaria
- Education: National Academy of Music in Sofia
- Occupation: Soprano
- Years active: 1992–present
- Website: www.svetlavassileva.com

Svetla Vassileva (Bulgarian: Светла Василева; born 9 September 1965 in Dobrich) is a Bulgarian opera singer (soprano).

== Career ==
Her repertoire includes Desdemona in Otello, Leonora in La forza del destino, Violetta in La traviata, Alice Ford in Falstaff, the title role in Madama Butterfly, La rondine, Suor Angelica and Manon Lescaut, Liu in Turandot, the title role in Rusalka, Lisa in Pique Dame, Tatiana in Yevgeni Onegin, the title role in Francesca da Rimini (Rachmaninov) and in Francesca da Rimini (Zandonai), Nedda in Pagliacci, Zemfira in Aleko, and many others. She performs regularly at the Royal Opera House Covent Garden, the Vienna Staatsoper, La Scala in Milano as well as at the opera houses of Paris, San Francisco, Washington, Chicago, Rome, Florence, Turin, Geneva, Tokyo, Naples, Oslo, Monte Carlo, Venice and many others. She works with conductors such as Bruno Bartoletti, Riccardo Chailly, Daniele Gatti, Vladimir Jurowski, Nicola Luisotti, Lorin Maazel, Zubin Mehta, Riccardo Muti, Kent Nagano, Gianandrea Noseda, Daniel Oren, George Pretre, Yutake Sado, Jeffrey Tate, Yuri Temirkanov, Stefano Vignati.

== Critical reception ==
Laura Biggs of Musical Criticism wrote that Vassileva's performance as Cio-Cio San in Madama Butterfly "delivered a luxurious spinto sound. It lent her character absolute command. Hers was a voice to be reckoned with."

Pietro Acquafredda of Il Giornale wrote, "Svetla Vassileva has been one Violetta of great intensity and participation, round and intense voice, from the manual of the third act."

== Recordings ==
- Antonio Smareglia: Nozze istriane– conductor Tiziano Severini, Ian Storey (tenor), Katia Lytting (mezzo-soprano), Svetla Vassileva (soprano), Enzo Capuano (baritone), Giorgio Surjan (bass), Alberto Mastromarino (baritone); Teatro Verdi di Trieste Orchestra and Chorus. Live performance recording from the Teatro Lirico Giuseppe Verdi, December 1999. Label: Bongiovanni BGV 2265 king
- Giuseppe Verdi: Giovanna d'Arco – conductor Bruno Bartoletti, Teatro Regio di Parma, 2008. DVD:C Major Cat:721208
- Giuseppe Verdi: Falstaff – conductor Andrea Battistoni, Teatro Regio di Parma, 2011, Blu-ray, C Major 725304
- Giuseppe Verdi: Traviata – conductor Yuri Temirkanov, Teatro Regio di Parma, 2011 Blu-ray, HD: C Major 72368
- Giacomo Puccini: La Rondine – conductor Alberto Veronesi, 53rd Puccini Festival, Torre del Lago, 2007 NTSC DVD: 2.110266
- Sergei Rachmaninoff: Francesca da Rimini - conductor Gianandrea Noseda, BBC Philharmonic, CD
- Ruggero Leoncavallo: I Pagliacci - conductor Vjekoslav Sutej, Choir and Orchestra from Arena di Verona, 2006 DVD Deutsche Grammophon = DGG. 07342959
