= Janet Perry =

American soprano

- Born: December 27, 1944 (age 81); Minneapolis, Minnesota
- Education: Bachelor of Music
- Alma mater: Curtis Institute of Music
- Occupation: Operatic soprano

Janet Perry (born December 27, 1947, Minneapolis) is an American operatic soprano. In 1959, aged 11, she was seen in a stage-version of The Wizard of Oz at the St Paul Civic Opera. Following high school, she matriculated at the Curtis Institute of Music, under the tutelage of Mme Eufemia Giannini-Gregory.

Having earned her Bachelor of Music, she left for Europe where she debuted at the Linz Opera as Zerlina in Don Giovanni in 1969. In subsequent seasons, Perry was featured in most of the continent's major opera houses (including La Scala, 1978), as well as most of its famed festivals, including those of Salzburg, Glyndebourne, Aix-en-Provence, and Bregenz.

A particular favorite of Herbert von Karajan, she also sang under Carlos Kleiber, Karl Böhm, Riccardo Muti, Daniel Barenboim, Nikolaus Harnoncourt, Mstislav Rostropovich, Rafael Kubelík, James Levine, Stefano Vignati and Wolfgang Sawallisch, as well as the stage directors Jean-Pierre Ponnelle and Giorgio Strehler.

She sang a famous performance of Der Rosenkavalier with Karajan in 1988.

== Abridged discography ==
- Smetana: The Bartered Bride [as Esmeralda] {in German} (Stratas, Kollo; Krombholc, 1975) Eurodisc
- Verdi: Falstaff [as Nannetta] (Kabaivanska, Ludwig, Araiza, Taddei; Karajan, 1980) Philips
- Mozart: Die Zauberflöte [as Papagena] (Mathis, Ott, Araiza, van Dam; Karajan, 1980) Deutsche Grammophon
- Mozart: Thamos, König in Ägypten (Harnoncourt, 1980) Teldec
- Mozart: Great Mass in C minor (Hendricks, Schreier, Luxon; Karajan, 1982) Deutsche Grammophon
- R. Strauss: Der Rosenkavalier [as Sophie] (Tomowa-Sintow, Baltsa, Moll; Karajan, 1982) Deutsche Grammophon
- Beethoven: Ninth Symphony (Baltsa, Cole, van Dam; Karajan, 1983) Deutsche Grammophon
- Bruckner: "Te Deum" (Karajan, 1984) Deutsche Grammophon
- Mercadante: Il bravo (Aprea, 1990) [live] Nuova Era

== Abridged videography ==
- Mozart: Le nozze di Figaro [as Barbarina] (Freni, Te Kanawa, Ewing, Prey, Fischer-Dieskau; Böhm, Ponnelle, 1976) Deutsche Grammophon
- Monteverdi: Il ritorno d'Ulisse in patria [as Melanto] (Hollweg, Schmidt, Araiza, Estes; Harnoncourt, Ponnelle, 1979) Deutsche Grammophon
- Monteverdi: L'incoronazione di Poppea [as Drusilla] (Yakar, Schmidt, Esswood, Tappy, Araiza, Salminen; Harnoncourt, Ponnelle, 1980) Deutsche Grammophon
- Verdi: Falstaff (Kabaivanska, Ludwig, Araiza, Taddei; Karajan, Karajan, 1982) [live] Sony
- J. S. Bach: Kaffeekantate (Schreier, Holl; Harnoncourt, 1984) [live] Deutsche Grammophon
- R. Strauss: Der Rosenkavalier (Tomowa-Sintow, Baltsa, Moll; Karajan, Karajan, 1984) [live] Sony
- J. Strauss II: Die Fledermaus [as Adele] (Coburn, Faßbaender, Hopferwieser, Wächter; Kleiber, Schenk, 1987) [live] Deutsche Grammophon
