= Aris Argiris =

Greek opera singer and vocal pedagogue

- Άρης Αργύρης
- Born: Argyrios Papagiannopoulos; 20 December 1974 (age 51); Athens, Greece
- Occupations: Operatic baritone; Vocal pedagoge
- Website: www.arisargiris.de

Argyrios Papagiannopoulos (Greek: Αργύριος Παπαγιαννοπουλος; born 20 December 1974), known professionally as Aris Argiris (Greek: Άρης Αργύρης), is a Greek operatic baritone and vocal pedagogue. Initially known for his portrayals of Don Giovanni, Giorgio Germont in La traviata, Escamillo in Carmen, and Figaro in The Barber of Seville, he is now also known for main Verdi roles such as Rigoletto, Nabucco, Amonasro in Aida and Iago in Otello as well as Wagner's Wotan in Das Rheingold, Die Walküre and Siegfried.

== Life and education ==
Argiris was born Argyrios Papagiannopoulos in Athens on December 20, 1974. He has been involved with music since the age of 11. Argiris studied Saxophone, and music theory, and received a diploma in counterpoint. He was in the university choir where he met professional singers who encouraged him to take voice lessons in December 1993. In January 1994 he joined the opera chorus of the Greek National Opera, while he continued to study marketing, Italian and English at the same time. He studied singing under Kostas Paskalis, Frangiskos Voutsinos, and Despina Kalafati, and joined the master class of Gabriella Ravazzi in Orvieto, Italy in 1996. His first engagements as soloist where in small roles at the Greek National Opera in Athens in 1997. In 1999, he received the Maria Callas Scholarship, which supports the study abroad of young Greek singers, enabling him to continue his vocal studies in the master class by Greek mezzo-soprano Daphne Evangelatos at the University of Music and Theatre Munich. He also studied with Josef Metternich. During his studies, he performed in concerts and productions at venues such as the Prinzregententheater in Munich and the Gewandhaus in Leipzig.

== Career ==
Early in his career Argiris used his legal last name Papagiannopoulos. With this name he appeared as Filiberto on a live recording of Rossini's Il Signor Bruschino conducted by Gustav Kuhn, and as Escamillo in Bizet's Carmen, conducted by Nikos Athineos at the Thessaloniki Concert Hall in 2001, as Belcore in Donizetti's L'elisir d'amore with the Greek National Opera at the Olympia Theatre in Athens, and in the titel role in Mozart's Don Giovanni at the Kammeroper Schloss Rheinsberg festival in the summer of 2002, which he had won in the international competition. Argiris was also credited as Aris Papagiannopoulos when he sang Lazar in the world premiere of Alexander Mullenbach's Die Todesbrücke, a co-production of the Musiktheater im Revier, Théâtre National du Luxembourg and the Grand Théâtre de la ville de Luxembourg. Working at the Musiktheater im Revier in Gelsenkirchen in 2002 led to Argiris' engagement in the theater's soloists ensemble.

Two years later, Argiris joined the ensemble of the Theater Dortmund, where he appeared as Guglielmo in Mozart's Così fan tutte conducted by Dirk Kaftan, as Donner in Wagner's Das Rheingold alongside Wolfgang Koch as Wotan, Jeff Martin as Mime, and Annette Seiltgen as Fricka in the staging by Christine Mielitz. In Dortmund, Argiris also made his role debut as Giorgio Germont in Verdi's La traviata, conducted by Kaftan. With the same role he made his Theater Bonn debut in a staging by Andreas Homoki in the 2005/2006 season, which led to him joining the Theater Bonn ensemble in the 2006/07 season. At this time, he was already contracted to join Oper Frankfurt in the 2008/09 season. His role debuts in Bonn included Almaviva in Le nozze di Figaro, Enrico in Lucia di Lammermoor, and Valentin in Gounod's Faust with the Beethoven Orchester Bonn conducted by Wolfgang Lischke, directed by Vera Nemirova in 2008.

Argiris received an honorary distinction for Best New Artist by the Union of Greek Theater and Music Critics at the Athens Concert Hall in 2007, and returned to the Schloss Rheinsberg Festival in the first of the Benefiz-Recitals performed by festival alumni. He is considered one of the best known "Rheinsberg Career" singers. He left Theater Bonn to join the ensemble of Oper Frankfurt in the season 2008/09 as planned, and made his house debut as Don Giovanni. In Frankfurt he performed the Puccini roles of Marcello in La bohème, Guglielmo in Le villi, Rambaldo Fernandez in La rondine, the Verdi roles of Francesco in I masnadieri and Rodrigo in Don Carlo, Germont in La traviata, as well as Enrico in Donizetti's Lucia di Lammermoor, Dandini in Rossini's La Cenerentola, Ramiro in Ravel's L'heure espagnole, and Lindorf in Offenbach's Les contes d'Hoffmann.

Carmen in 3D, the first 3D opera film, featured Argiris as Escamillo, Christine Rice as Carmen, Bryan Hymel as Don José, and Maija Kovalevska as Micaëla in Francesca Zambello's staging from 2006. It was recorded 2010 at the Royal Opera House in London, and conducted by Constantinos Carydis. The stereoscopic film premiered as a special event at the Santa Barbara International Film Festival 2011, and was released on home media.

Argiris left the Oper Frankfurt ensemble after the 2010/2011 season, and made his debuts at Arena di Verona as Figaro in Il barbiere di Siviglia, as Renato in Un ballo in maschera in St. Petersburg, and at the New National Theatre Tokyo as Marcello in La bohème.

In 2013 Argiris made his debut as Lescaut in Mariusz Treliński's staging of Manon Lescaut with Eva-Maria Westbroek as Manon and Brandon Jovanovich as Des Grieux at La Monnaie, a co-production with Teatr Wielki Opera Narodowa and Welsh National Opera, which was live streamed to movie theaters in Belgium and France, and made available to watch on streaming services.

He was Escamillo in Nicola Berloffa's staging of Carmen at the Theater St. Gallen in 2014, with Alex Penda in the titel role, Ladislav Elgr as Don José and Cristina Pasaroiu as Micaëla. Footage from the rehearsals was used in the documentary Loving Carmen.

Argiris then returned to the Musiktheater im Revier for his debut as Rigoletto in 2015 in a staging by the theater's intendant Michael Schulz, conducted by Generalmusikdirektor (GMD) Rasmus Baumann. His performance as The Ruler in Korngold's Das Wunder der Heliane, performed in concert at Theater Freiburg in 2017 with Annemarie Kremer as Heliane, Ian Storey as the Stranger and the Philharmonisches Orchester Freiburg conducted by Fabrice Bollon, was released on CD in 2018.

When Argiris made his debut as Wotan in Die Walküre at the Theater Chemnitz in 2018, he became the first Greek baritone to perform this role on its stage. Siegmund was sung by Zoltán Nyári, Fricka by Monika Bohinec, Dara Hobbs was Brünnhilde, Christiane Kohl was Sieglinde, the staging was by Monique Wagemakers, the conductor was Felix Bender.

Argiris performed as Iago in Otello at Opera di Montreal, as Amonasro in Aida at Gärtnerplatztheater München and with the Athens Festival at Herodes Atticus. He sang Orest in the German version of Gluck's Iphigenie auf Taurus by Richard Strauss at the Gluck International Festival, Scarpia in Tosca at the Musiktheater im Revier, Figaro at Semperoper Dresden, Paolo in Simon Boccanegra at Vlaamse Opera and Les Theatres de la Villes de Luxembourg, Sharpless in Madama Butterfly at Theatre de la Monnaie, Wotan at Theater an der Wien and Theater Chemnitz, Rigoletto at Scottish Opera, Jochanaan in Salome at Theater Bern, Escamillo at Staatsoper Hamburg, Teatro San Carlo di Napoli and the Savonlinna Opera Festival, Francesco in I masnadieri at Aalto Musiktheater, Renato at San Diego Opera, Nardo in La finta giardiniera at Staatsoper Berlin, and he sang in concerts with the Israel Philharmonic Orchestra under Zubin Mehta.

During the first lockdown of the COVID-19 Pandemic in early 2020, Argiris initiated an interview series in collaboration with Detlef Obens, the editor of the German online magazine Das Opernmagazin, in which his artistic peers reported on their "perspective and experiences during this time of crisis". At Obens' recommendation, Argiris was invited to represent opera in episodes of B.o.B. – Berühren ohne Berührung, a weekly broadcast of live music performances.

In 2021, Argiris returned to Chemnitz to sing Wotan in Das Rheingold, Die Walküre, and Siegfried.

Argiris made his European debut as Iago in Verdi's Otello in 2024, alongside Gaston Rivero who made his debut at the Staatstheater Darmstadt in the title role, and Megan Marie Hart, who made her role debut as Desdemona. Darmstadt's GMD Daniel Cohen conducted, the director was Paul-Georg Dittrich. While reviewers praised the singers and orchestra, they reacted negatively to Dittrich's staging. Argiris returned to Darmstadt in 2025 to sing Amonasro in Aida, with Hart in the title role, Matthew Vickers as Radamès and Irina Ignata as Amneris, in a co-production between the Staatstheater Darmstadt and the Finnish National Opera directed by Noa Naamat and conducted by first Kapellmeister and deputy GMD Johannes Zahn. The production opened Darmstadt's 2025/2026 season and received enthusiastic reviews.

Since 2016, Argiris is professor for voice at the Berlin University of the Arts, where he teaches all voice types. He held master class seminars in Greece in collaboration with the Maria Callas Scholarship Association, which had been influential in his own career. According to Argiris, his wife mezzo-soprano Guadalupe Larzabal was his first student. Together, they had a voice studio in Bonn, where they live with their two daughters. In 2026 Argiris self-published the book The Interconnected Voice: A Pocket Guide for Young Classical Singers wich is aimed at students and teachers of classical singing. The illustrations in the book were created with the assistance of artificial intelligence.

== Publications ==
- The Interconnected Voice: A Pocket Guide for Young Classical Singers. (Amazon Digital Services LLC, 2026)

== Recordings ==
=== Audio ===
- Rossini: Il Signor Bruschino. With Gianpiero Ruggeri (Gaudenzio), Hiroko Kouda (Sofia), Ezio Maria Tisi (Bruschino padre), Johannes Puchleitner (Bruschino figlio), Edvard Strah (Commissario di Polizia), Patrizio Saudelli (Florville), Aris Papagiannopoulos (Filiberto), Claudia Schneider (Marianna), conductor: Gustav Kuhn. Recorded live on August 9, 2000, in Wörgl. Arte Nova Classics. OCLC 1115263344
- Siegfried Matthus: Ariadne (Dithyrambos) and Holofernes' aria "Eins möchte ich wissen" from Judith on Beloved Dionysos. With Aris Argiris, Württembergische Philharmonie Reutlingen, conductor: Ola Rudner. (Genuin, 2009)
- Carlo Enrico Pasta: Atahualpa. With Aris Argiris, Arianna Ballotta, Ivan Magrì, Vassily Ladyuk, Carlo Cigni, Xavier Fernández, Juan Pablo Marcos, Rosa Parodi, Orquesta Sinfónica Nacional del Perú, conductor: Manuel López-Gómez. (Universal Classics and Jazz, 2015)
- Korngold: Das Wunder der Heliane. With Annemarie Kremer, Ian Storey, Aris Argiris, Katerina Hebelková, Frank van Hove, Nutthaporn Thammathi, György Hanczár, Philharmonisches Orchester Freiburg, conductor: Fabrice Bollon. (Naxos, 2018)

=== Video ===
- Bizet: Carmen in 3D (Julian Napier, USA/UK 2011). With Christine Rice, Bryan Hymel, Aris Argiris, Maija Kovalevska, Orchestra of the Royal Opera House, conductor: Constantinos Carydis, staging: Francesca Zambello. (Opus Arte, 2011)
- Loving Carmen (Nayo Titzin, BG 2016). Documentary narrated by Ben Cross, contains footage filmed at Theater St. Gallen, with Aris Argiris, Alexandrina Pendatchanska.
