= Renate Holm =

German actress and operatic soprano (1931–2022)

- Born: Renate Franke; 10 August 1931; Berlin, Brandenburg, Prussia, Germany
- Died: 21 April 2022 (aged 90); Vienna, Austria
- Occupations: Actress; Operatic soprano; Voice teacher; Festival manager
- Organizations: Vienna Volksoper; Vienna State Opera
- Title: Kammersängerin
- Spouse: Horst-Wolfgang Haase (m. 1965; div. 1972)
- Awards: Austrian Decoration for Science and Art; Order of Merit of the Federal Republic of Germany

Renate Holm (10 August 1931 – 21 April 2022) was a German-Austrian film actress and operatic soprano. She worked as a dentists' assistant and took private singing lessons, resulting in performances in musical films and schlager. She made her debut at the Vienna Volksoper in 1957, and moved on to the Vienna State Opera where she worked for decades. She appeared internationally and made many recordings, especially for the WDR in a series of operettas with conductor Franz Marszalek. She later worked as a voice teacher, juror at competitions, and festival manager. Her memoir was published in 2017.

== Life and career ==
Renate Franke was born in Berlin. She said that she decided to become an opera singer at age twelve, inspired by a film version of Puccini's Madama Butterfly with Maria Cebotari in the title role. Her mother had taken her to the cinema as a treat for an excellent school report. In 1943 her parents separated. That same year women with children were evacuated from the bombed-out centre of Berlin, and the Frankes were sent to the Spree Forest region roughly 90 km (50 miles) to the east of the city. Appreciative of her new surroundings, she spent the rest of her childhood around the village of Ragow where her mother served as local mayor and registrar. The girl's taste of musical performance came in Lübben where she was a member of the school choir and the church choir. She was a pupil at the Paul-Gerhardt-Gymnasium, a six-kilometer (four-mile) journey on a bicycle from her home at Ragow. In Berlin, she had attended a school for girls, and the Lübben gymnasium provided her first experience of mixed gender schooling: fifty years later, she would still be in touch with two friends – a tenor and a bass – with whom she had formed a school vocal trio.

After World War II, the region ended up administered as part of the Soviet occupation zone, which in October 1949 was relaunched as the Soviet-sponsored German Democratic Republic (East Germany). In 1950, her mother arranged for a meeting with Waltraud Waldeck, a local singer and singing teacher who declared that Renate had a natural singing voice and should take singing lessons. Waldeck became Franke's first singing teacher. To afford the lessons, she trained and worked as a dentist's assistant, also to satisfy her mother's interest in a solid profession. She also sold cigarettes and chocolates at a local theatre. She studied privately with the internationally known coloratura soprano Maria Ivogün in Berlin, and later with Maria Hittorf in Vienna.

In 1953, her mother entered her in a local talent competition. She sang "Lied der Nachtigall" ("Song of the Nightingale") by Franz Grothe. By winning the contest, she caught the attention of the RIAS, an American-sponsored radio station set up in West Berlin to provide an alternative source of broadcast news and entertainment. She quickly established a singing career as a radio schlager singer, and then broadened her scope to include film music. It was around this time that she changed her professional name from Franke to Holm, in order to avoid confusion with the established schlager singer Renée Franke. During the mid-1950s, Holm appeared in musical films and heimatfilme, becoming popular with cinema audiences. Her profile was further enhanced by operetta recordings and radio broadcasts.

=== Opera in Vienna ===
In 1957, Holm was engaged by Hubert Marischka to work at the Vienna Volksoper. She had just received an invitation to star as Eliza Doolittle in the German premiere of My Fair Lady at the Theater des Westens in Berlin, but was more interested in pursuing a career in opera. Holm drove to Vienna in her new first car, taking her mother along. She made her Volksoper debut as Princess Helene in Ein Walzertraum by Oscar Straus. She received international recognition when she moved to the Vienna State Opera. Her first performance there was as Gretchen in Lortzing's Der Wildschütz in 1960. She was a member of the ensemble for 30 years until 1991 after Herbert von Karajan offered her the permanent contract. She performed at the house 470 times, remembered in roles such as Papagena in Mozart's Die Zauberflöte, Marzelline in Beethoven's Fidelio, Musetta in Puccini's La bohème and Blonde in Mozart's Die Entführung aus dem Serail. She also performed as both Susanna und Contessa in Mozart's Le nozze di Figaro, in Richard Strauss roles such as Zerbinetta in Ariadne auf Naxos and Sophie in Der Rosenkavalier, and as Adele in Die Fledermaus by Johann Strauss.

Holm appeared at the Salzburg Festival as Blonde from 1961 to 1963, and as Papagena in 1974. She performed as Musetta at the Salzburg Easter Festival of 1975. Holm appeared in many of the world's great opera houses, performing alongside Rudolf Schock, Fritz Wunderlich, Hermann Prey and Peter Minich, among others. She appeared at the Teatro Colón in Buenos Aires from 1961, as Blonde, Susanna, Zerlina in Mozart's Don Giovanni, Papagena, and Isotta in Die schweigsame Frau by R. Strauss. She was a resident in Austria for more than sixty years. In 1971 she was awarded the honorific title Kammersängerin. Her wide-ranging repertoire included classical opera, operettas and contemporary modern music theatre, lied and concert arias. She made Wienerlieder one of her specialties. She made numerous operatic recordings for labels such as EMI, Decca and Polydor, and also for the radio, in particular the WDR. She appeared there with the operetta specialist Franz Marszalek conducting, including rarities such as Wenn Liebe erwacht by Eduard Künneke.

She served as president of the Weinviertler Kultursommer, an annual festival, in 1986 and 1987, on the recommendation of its founder Gerhard Gutruf, and gave there master classes in singing between 1983 and 1990.

Holm continued to perform in concerts in the 21st century. She participated in festivals such as the Elblandfestspiele Wittenberge in Germany, and in 2006 played Viktoria in the premiere of Mich hätten Sie sehen sollen at the Theater in der Josefstadt. She also still served as a voice teacher and a jury member in international competitions. Since 2009, she chaired the kuratorium of the Berlin-based Europäische Kulturwerkstatt.

=== Personal life and death ===
Holm was a granddaughter of Karl von Bülow (1846–1921). She married Horst-Wolfgang Haase in 1965. The marriage lasted seven years. She lived in Vienna for most of her life.

Holm died in Vienna on 21 April 2022, at the age of 90.

== Filmography ==
- Hit Parade (1953)
- The Telephone Operator (1954)
- The Big Star Parade (1954)
- Wunschkonzert (1955)
- Where the Lark Sings (1956)
- The Count of Luxemburg (1957)
- Love, Girls and Soldiers (1958)
- Marina (1960)
- Die Fledermaus (1972)

== Writing ==
- Dobretsberger, Christine (2017). "Wer seiner Seele Flügel gibt ..." mit Kunst das Leben meistern (in German). Wien: Amalthea Signum Verlag. ISBN 978-3-99050-098-9. OCLC 986997787.

== Awards ==
- Austrian Kammersängerin (1971)
- Goldenes Ehrenzeichen für Verdienste um das Land Wien (2002)
- Austrian Decoration for Science and Art (2002)
- Officer's cross of the Order of Merit of the Federal Republic of Germany (2002)

== Bibliography ==
- Dassanowsky, Robert von (18 October 2007). Austrian Cinema. McFarland. ISBN 978-0-7864-3733-7.
