= Nozze istriane =

- Opera by Antonio Smareglia
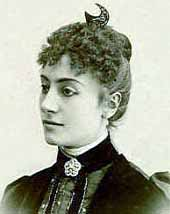
- Gemma Bellincioni, who created the role of Marussa
- Librettist: Luigi Illica
- Language: Italian
- Premiere: 28 March 1895; Teatro Comunale, Trieste

Nozze istriane (An Istrian wedding) is an opera in three acts by Antonio Smareglia to an Italian libretto by Luigi Illica. It premiered on 28 March 1895 at the Teatro Comunale in Trieste.

== Roles ==
Role	Voice type	Premiere Cast, 28 March 1895 (Conductor: )
Marussa	soprano	Gemma Bellincioni
Lorenzo	tenor	Roberto Stagno
Menico, Marussa's father	bass	Ruggero Galli
Biaggio, the village fiddler	bass	Rodolfo Angelini
Nicola	baritone	Tito Scipione Terzi
Luze	mezzo-soprano	Elisa Marconini
Peasant men and women of Dignano

== Synopsis ==
Time: 1895
Place: The village of Dignano

Marussa and Lorenzo, two young villagers, are in love. However, a more wealthy suitor, Nicola, has said that he would waive a dowry. Marussa's miserly father, Menico, is convinced by the village fiddler, Biagio, to marry her off to Nicola. Marussa is tricked into believing that Lorenzo has been unfaithful, and her wedding to Nicola is quickly arranged. In her room, shortly before the wedding, Marussa begs Nicola to release her from their engagement. Nicola refuses, and Lorenzo (who had been hiding behind the curtains), leaps out and attacks Nicola with a knife. During the fight, Nicola stabs Lorenzo, who dies in Marussa's arms.

== Recording ==
- Antonio Smareglia: Nozze istriane – Ian Storey (tenor), Katia Lytting (mezzo-soprano), Svetla Vassileva (soprano), Enzo Capuano (baritone), Giorgio Surjan (bass), Alberto Mastromarino (baritone); Teatro Verdi di Trieste Orchestra and Chorus; Tiziano Severini (conductor). Live performance recording from the Teatro Lirico Giuseppe Verdi, December 1999. Label: Bongiovanni BGV 2265 king
