= Opera Carolina =

Company in the United States

- Opera Carolina logo
- Predecessor: Charlotte Opera Association
- Established: 1948
- Merger of: North Carolina Opera (1986)
- Type: Non-profit
- Location: Charlotte, North Carolina
- Services: Professional opera company
- Members: Opera America
- General director: Stefano Vignati
- Artistic director & deputy general director: Claudio Ferri
- Music director & principal conductor: Stefano Vignati
- Artistic & programs planning manager: Gail Garvin
- Budget: $2.9 million
- Staff: 8
- Volunteers: Opera Carolina Chorus, Opera Guild of Charlotte, Bravo! Young Professionals, Supernumeraries, and others
- Website: Official website

Opera Carolina is a professional opera company in Charlotte, North Carolina. Founded in 1948 by the Charlotte Music Club as the Charlotte Opera Association, the company was renamed Opera Carolina after its 1986 merger with North Carolina Opera which combined the main stage, educational, and touring operations of the two companies. Its past leadership has included artistic directors Richard Marshall and Charles Rosekrans, and general director James Wright. From 2000 to 2023, Opera Carolina has been under the direction of general director and principal conductor James Meena. On July 1, 2024, Shantè Williams was appointed new general director until July 2026. In July 2026, Stefano Vignati was appointed general director while continuing as music director and principal conductor. Claudio Ferri is the artistic director and deputy general director.

Opera Carolina is a member of Opera America and is supported by the Arts & Science Council, the National Endowment for the Arts, and the North Carolina Arts Council. Opera Carolina presents three main stage productions, featuring the Opera Carolina Chorus and the Charlotte Symphony Orchestra, in the Belk Theater in the Blumenthal Performing Arts Center. Opera Carolina also presented an annual concert, Art – Poetry – Music, at the Knight Theater. Opera Carolina's season begins in October and runs until mid April.

After closing due to the COVID-19 pandemic, Opera Carolina announced resumption of live on-stage performances in April 2021 for September 2021.
