= Stefano Vignati =

Italian-born conductor

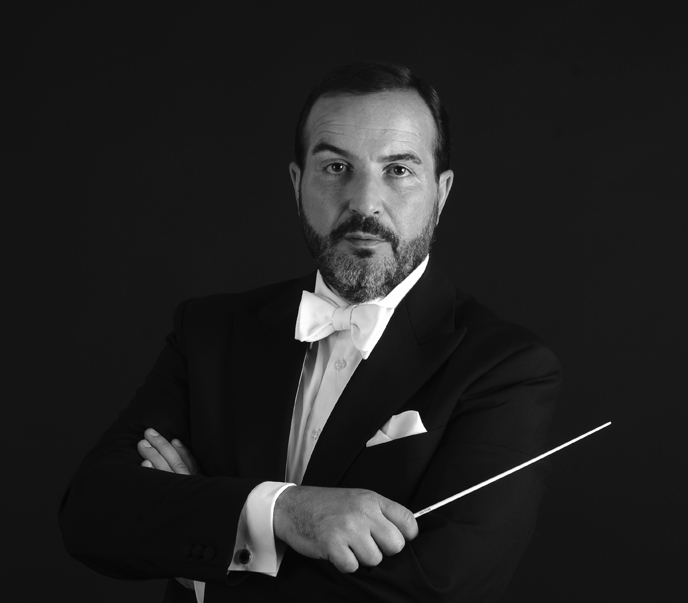

Stefano Vignati is an Italian-American conductor, born in the outskirts of Rome, Italy, and naturalized in America. Vignati is currently the general director, music director and principal conductor for Opera Carolina.

== Biography ==
Originally a pianist and composer, studying under the guidance of noted Maestri C. Savelloni, C. Ricci, and T. Procaccini, Vignati studied conducting with Nicola Hansalik Samale and Lawrence Golan, and holds a master's degree in conducting from the University of Denver, Colorado. He also studied History and Musical Analysis at the University "La Sapienza" in Rome with Prof. P. Luigi Petrobelli. He taught at Drake University as a vocal coach and Italian instructor with the World Languages and Cultures Department. He was also director and principal conductor of the Drake Opera Theater (2016–2022) where he conducted works such as The Magic Flute and Falstaff.

Vignati made his United States debut in 1998 in New Mexico conducting Cavalleria Rusticana and I Pagliacci in a production by UNM in collaboration with Santa Fe Opera and Virginia Opera.

Vignati was the artistic and music director of the Tuscia Operafestival in Italy between 2006 and 2017. In 2007, he conducted Le nozze di Figaro in a production directed by Academy Award-winning filmmaker Lina Wertmüller, with set design by Enrico Job. The performance was later broadcast on the Italian television program Prima della prima on Rai TRE in November of that year. In 2009, he was also appointed artistic and music director of the Italian American Opera Foundation in Los Angeles, and in 2010, he became artistic director of the Festival Barocco di Viterbo – at which he conducted ensembles such as the Baroque Orchestra of the Accademia di Santa Cecilia.

In 2009, Vignati was also a guest teacher at the SOSCA Academy in Los Angeles.

Additionally, he is currently artistic and music director of the International Lyric Academy, which collaborated with Teatro Comunale di Vicenza to introduce the annual summer music event "Music for Life" beginning in 2018. He is also a principal guest conductor at New York City Opera.

Opera Carolina named Stefano Vignati in July 2026 to the position of general director while continuing to serve as music director and principal conductor. He started his new role on May 1, 2025. Vignati made his company debut in 2023, leading The Marriage of Figaro. Vignati has conducted more than 60 operas and numerous symphonic works across Italy, Switzerland, the United States, Canada, Bulgaria, China, Serbia, Germany, Slovenia, the Republic of Macedonia, Croatia, and Russia. He has also collaborated with world-renowned artists such as: Lina Wertmüller, Michele Campanella, Mariella Devia, Massimo Cavalletti, Nancy Fabiola Herrera, Bruno Pratico, Alfonso Antoniozzi, Pierre Amoyal, Nicola Ulivieri, Marco Vinco, Mirko Palazzi, Jesús León, Moni Ovadia, Janet Perry, Carol Neblett, Limmy Pulliam, Svetla Vasileva, Leo Ahn and Alexander Malta. Vignati has conducted the Wuhan Philharmonic Orchestra, the Italia Konzert Opera, the Orchestra of Rome and Lazio, the Orchestra of the Teatro di Sassari, the UNM Symphony Orchestra, the Amarillo Symphony of Dallas, the Tonhalle in Zürich, the Orchestra and Choir of the Teatro Goldoni of Livorno, the FVG Friuli Venezia Giulia Orchestra, the Orchestra Francesco Cilea, the Charlotte Symphony., and the Orchestra of Teatro Carlo Felice di Genova

Stefano Vignati was selected to open the Global Centennial Puccini Celebrations in China (December 2025 - January 2026) by conducting Giacomo Puccini’s Turandot, commemorating the 100th anniversary of Puccini’s death (1924–2024). The production was presented by the Festival Puccini Torre del Lago and featured sets by Ezio Frigerio and costumes by Academy Award‑winning Franca Squarciapino.

== Recordings ==
Vignati has published a number of recordings, including Giulio Cesare by Handel, Stabat Mater by Pergolesi, and Requiem by Verdi. He recorded his first Concerto, produced by RAI Radio-Television for "I Concerti di RaiTre" with soloist David Siffermann in 1995.
