= La falena =

- Opera by Antonio Smareglia
- Librettist: Silvio Benco
- Language: Italian
- Premiere: 6 September 1897; Teatro Rossini, Venice

La falena (The Moth-Woman) is a leggenda or opera in three acts by composer Antonio Smareglia with an Italian libretto by Silvio Benco. The opera premiered at the Teatro Rossini in Venice on 6 September 1897.

== Musical analysis ==
La falena is a through composed opera containing an all-pervasive symphonic movement which is only broken in between acts. The music for the extended Act 2 duet between the virtuous king and the evil protagonist is particularly thrilling. The two men move as hallucinatory figures as the music rages with nightmarish obsessive urges that heighten the opera's drama.

== Roles ==
Role	Voice type	Premiere Cast, 6 September 1897 (Conductor: Gialdino Gialdini)
Albina	soprano	Emma Carelli
King Stellio	tenor	Alfonso Garulli
Uberto	baritone	Vittorio Brombara
Falena	mezzo-soprano	Alice Cucini
