= Hans Müller-Einigen =

Austrian author (1882–1950)

Hans Müller(-Einigen) (born 25 October 1882 in Brünn, Austria-Hungary; died 8 March 1950 in Einigen) was a German language writer, author of screenplays and director. As his proper name, Hans Müller, was quite common, he added the name of the Swiss village of Einigen to it.

He is known for The White Horse Inn (Im weißen Rößl, 1930), written together with Robert Gilbert and Erik Charell, set to music by Ralph Benatzky. Earlier, he collaborated frequently with composer Erich Wolfgang Korngold, writing the librettos for Violanta (1916) and Das Wunder der Heliane (1927), and having Korngold score the incidental music to his Der Vampir oder Die Gejagten (1923).

Müller-Einigen went to Hollywood in the 1920s where several films were made from his scripts. Since 1930 he lived in Einigen.

His brother was the author and critic Ernst Lothar (real name: Ernst Lothar Müller).

Hans Müller was attacked in Karl Kraus' play The Last Days of Mankind and in his journal Die Fackel^{(de)} (The Torch).

== Works ==
Novels

- Buch der Abenteuer, 1905 – including Nux, der Prinzgemahl, made into the operetta Ein Walzertraum (1907) and the film The Smiling Lieutenant (1931)

Poetry

- Die lockende Geige, 1904
- Der Garten des Lebens, 1904
- Die Rosenlaute, 1909

Dramas

- Das Wunder des Beatus, 1910
- Die Sterne, 1919 – made into the Ernst Lubitsch 1923 silent film Die Flamme
- Der Vampir oder die Gejagten, 1923, with incidental music provided by Erich Korngold.
- Der Helfer Gottes, 1947

Libretti

- Violanta, opera, 1916; music: Erich Wolfgang Korngold
- Das Wunder der Heliane, opera, 1927; music: Erich Wolfgang Korngold

Screen plays

- Die Tochter der Frau von Larsac, 1925 (silent movie)
- Schwester Veronica, 1927 (silent)
- The Burning Heart, 1929 (silent)
- Monte Carlo, 1930
- Darling of the Gods, 1930
- Bombs on Monte Carlo, 1931; music: Werner R. Heymann
- Yorck, 1931
- Quick, 1932
- Waltz War, 1933
- Fresh Wind from Canada, 1935

Autobiography

- Geliebte Erde, 1938
- Jugend in Wien, 1945
