= The Smiling Lieutenant =

1931 film directed by Ernst Lubitsch

- theatrical poster
- Directed by: Ernst Lubitsch
- Written by: Screenplay: Samson Raphaelson; Ernest Vajda; Uncredited: Ernst Lubitsch; French dialogue: Jacques Bataille-Henri
- Based on: Nux der Prinzgemahl 1905 novel by Hans Müller-Einigen; Ein Walzertraum 1907 operetta by; Leopold Jacobson Felix Dörmann
- Produced by: Ernst Lubitsch
- Starring: Maurice Chevalier; Claudette Colbert; Miriam Hopkins
- Cinematography: George J. Folsey
- Edited by: Merrill G. White
- Music by: Composer: Oscar Straus; Musical Director: Adolph Deutsch (uncredited)
- Distributed by: Paramount Pictures
- Release date: August 1, 1931; (US)
- Running time: 89 minutes
- Country: United States
- Language: English

The Smiling Lieutenant is a 1931 American pre-Code musical comedy film directed by Ernst Lubitsch, starring Maurice Chevalier, Claudette Colbert and Miriam Hopkins, and released by Paramount Pictures.

It was written by Samson Raphaelson and Ernest Vajda from the operetta Ein Walzertraum by Oscar Straus, with libretto by Leopold Jacobson and Felix Dörmann, which in turn was based on the novel Nux, der Prinzgemahl ("Nux the Prince Consort") by Hans Müller-Einigen. The film was nominated for the Academy Award for Best Picture. This was the first of three films directed by Lubitsch and starring Miriam Hopkins. The other two were Trouble in Paradise and Design for Living.

== Plot ==
In Vienna, Lieutenant Nikolaus "Niki" von Preyn meets Franzi, the leader of an all-female-orchestra. They soon fall in love. While standing in formation at a parade honouring the visiting royal family of Flausenthurm, Niki winks at Franzi in the crowd. Unfortunately the gesture is intercepted by Anna, the Princess of Flausenthurm. The naive princess takes offence; to assuage her, the lieutenant insists that he winked and smiled at her because of her beauty. This backfires; charmed and besotted, Anna demands that she marry the lieutenant, and threatens to marry an American if this plan is thwarted. Franzi leaves Niki upon seeing him return in a royal carriage. After intervention by the Emperor of Austria, an international incident is narrowly averted by the marriage of the lieutenant and the princess, though the marriage is not consummated, as Niki will only chastely kiss his bride—and his father-in-law.

Homesick and lovesick, Niki wanders the streets, and encounters Franzi, who has continued to perform with her orchestra in Flausenthurm since the wedding, unable to move on. The two resume their romance.

Anna finds out and confronts Franzi. During the confrontation, Franzi realizes that the princess is in fact deeply in love with the lieutenant. She decides to save the marriage by giving the dowdy princess a makeover, and they sing the duet "Jazz up your lingerie!" before Franzi departs for good. The results are a complete success as the lieutenant returns home, follows his satin-clad, cigarette-puffing wife into the bedroom and closes the door – opening it briefly to give the audience a last song and suggestive wink.

== Cast ==
- Maurice Chevalier as Lieutenant Nikolaus "Niki" von Preyn
- Claudette Colbert as Franzi
- Miriam Hopkins as Princess Anna
- Charles Ruggles as Max
- George Barbier as King Adolf XV
- Hugh O'Connell as Niki's Orderly
- Granville Bates as Bug Collector (uncredited)
- Cornelius MacSunday as Emperor Franz Josef (uncredited)

== Production ==
The film was not made under pleasant circumstances: the shift to the Astoria, New York, studios accounts for the sense of confinement on set. Chevalier described performing – "smiles and cute winks of the eye" – a "mechanical display of technique" due to grief over his mother's death. Lubitsch also played referee between Colbert and Hopkins, who were determined to be shot from the same angle. Lubitsch encouraged their dispute that suited their characters on screen.

Scenes from the film were included in the 1931 promotional film by Paramount, The House That Shadows Built.

== Reception ==
The Smiling Lieutenant was Paramount's biggest grosser of 1931. Barrios claims that "Lubitsch and Chevalier were invincible". It was also named among the year's "Best Ten" by The New York Times, along with Charlie Chaplin's City Lights and F. W. Murnau's Tabu.

Lubitsch was still in the stages of mastering sound-on-film technology and combining it with narrative: James Harvey acclaims that "technically The Smiling Lieutenant is the most accomplished of Lubitsch's early sound films. In sets, camerawork, background music, alternations of sound and silence, thus the film reaches a certain level that makes The Love Parade and Monte Carlo look comparatively stilted". For Andrew Sarris, The Smiling Lieutenant stands between the "lilting lyricism" of Love Parade and the "tempered ironies" in Trouble in Paradise.

Due to an ongoing copyright dispute with the silent-film version, The Smiling Lieutenant remained out of circulation for years and was considered as a lost film until a print was discovered in Denmark in the 1990s. When the film resurfaced, the "general elation" was followed by "an inevitable let down" due to technical problems.

== "The Lubitsch Touch" ==
The notion of "The Lubitsch Touch" is used to describe the visual comment or joke that becomes a trademark or signature of Lubitsch's films. Billy Wilder defines the touch in relation to The Smiling Lieutenant: "It was the elegant use of the Superjoke. You had a joke, and you felt satisfied, and then there was one more big joke on top of it. The joke you didn't expect. That was the Lubitsch touch." The ultimate Superjoke is that at the end of the film, "the wrong girl gets the man".
