= Das Wunder der Heliane =

1927 opera by Erich Wolfgang Korngold

- Opera by Erich Wolfgang Korngold
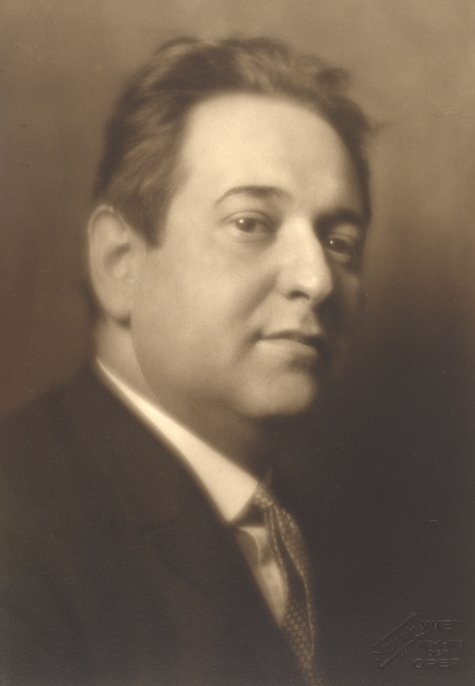
- Korngold c. 1927
- Translation: The Miracle of Heliane
- Librettist: Hans Müller-Einigen
- Language: German
- Based on: Die Heilige by Hans Kaltneker
- Premiere: 27 October 1927; Hamburg State Opera

Das Wunder der Heliane (German for The Miracle of Heliane), Op. 20 is an opera in three acts by Erich Wolfgang Korngold, about "the redemptive power of love over injustice and adversity". The libretto was by Hans Müller-Einigen, after Hans Kaltneker. It was first performed at the Hamburg State Opera on 7 October 1927. A suite for violin and piano based on the music from its famous aria "Ich ging zu ihm" was published by Schott.

After many successful premieres of other works across Germany, Korngold composed this new opera beginning in 1924. Before its premiere in 1927 Korngold claimed that it would be his masterwork.

== Performance history ==
Heliane had its world premiere in Hamburg, to critical and public success, and it went on to be performed on 12 stages in the coming years, including Vienna and Berlin. In 1928 it was presented at the Berlin Städtische Oper under Bruno Walter, where it met with negative reviews from critics who felt the music was not modern. However it continued to be widely performed until the rise of Nazism led to the suppression of work by Jewish composers.

According to Brendan G. Carroll's article in the New Grove, Das Wunder der Heliane is arguably Korngold's greatest opera. While it might not have been as popular as his previous Die tote Stadt, within the artistic community there is evidence that there was admiration for the work. Lotte Lehman stated that her recording of its famous musical sequence, "Ich ging zu ihm", was among her favorites.

=== 21st century ===
After the Second World War, Heliane was forgotten for some time. However, it was revived in the 21st century with high-profile performances in London, and a recording and performance at the BBC's Proms of "Ich ging zu ihm" sung by soprano Renée Fleming, which was included on Fleming's studio album.

In 2010 it was given at the Kaiserslautern Pfalztheater, under Uwe Sandner, director Johannes Reitmeier, set designer Daniel Dvorak, and costume designer Thomas Dörfler. Its cast included Sally du Randt (Heliane), Derrick Lawrence (Der Herrscher), Norbert Schmittberg (Der Fremde), Silvia Hablowetz (Die Botin), Alexis Wagner (Der Pförtner), Hans-Jörg Bock (Der blinde Scharfrichter), Alexandru Popescu (Der junge Mensch), Jung-Baik Seok, Michael McBride, Roland Goroll, Hubertus Bohrer, Eric Erlandsen, Miroslav Maj (Die sechs Richter), Elena Laborenz, and Galina Putintseva (Die seraphischen Stimmen).

In September 2017, a production at Opera Vlaanderen opened, directed by David Bösch and conducted by Alexander Joel with sets and costumes by Christof Hetzer. Its cast includes: Ausrine Stundyte (Heliane), Tómas Tómasson (Der Herrscher), Ian Storey (Der Fremde), Natascha Petrinsky (Die Botin), Denzil Delaere (Der Schwertrichter) and Markus Suihkonen (Der Pförtner).

The U.S. premiere took place in 2019 at Bard College, New York, as part of the Thirtieth Annual Bard Music Festival. Leon Botstein conducted the American Symphony Orchestra in a production staged by Christian Räth.

The French premiere took place in January and February 2026 at the Opéra national du Rhin, Strasbourg using Fergus McAlpine's reduced version for 70 instrumentalists. The production, from Nederlandse Reisopera was directed by Jakob Peters-Messer. Robert Houssart conducted the Orchestre philharmonique de Strasbourg, with Camille Schnoor (Héliane), Joseph Wagner (Der Herrscher), Ric Furman (Der Fremde), Kai Rüütel-Pajula (Die Botin), Damien Pass (Der Pförtner), and Paul McNamera (Der blinde Scharfrichter).

== Roles ==
| Role | Voice type | Premiere cast, 7 October 1927 (Conductor: Egon Pollak) |
|---|---|---|
| Heliane | soprano | Maria Hussa |
| The ruler, her husband | baritone | Rudolf Bockelmann |
| The stranger | tenor | Carl Günther |
| The messenger | alto | Sabine Kalter |
| The doorman | bass | Hermann Markowski |
| The blind judge | tenor | Gunnar Graarud |
| The young man | tenor | Jan Berlik |
| The six judges | | Paul Schwarz, Hermann Siegel, Julius Gutmann, Peter Kreuder, Herbert Taubert, Arnold Greve |
| The seraphic voices | | Olga Schramm-Tschörner, Franziska von Issendorf, Olga Wiese, Frieda Singler, Sophie Bock, Erna Homann, Janna Maria Balß |
| The people | Chorus | |

== Synopsis ==
Place: An unnamed totalitarian state
Time: In an unknown era.

=== Act 1 ===
The cruel Ruler exercises his power over the land, but suffers because he is unable to win the love of his wife Heliane. Since he is unhappy, he will not tolerate that his subjects live in happiness. A young Stranger has recently arrived in the land and is bringing the people joy; as a result, he was arrested, sentenced to death, and will be executed at sunrise. The Ruler visits him in order to learn the reason for his actions. The Stranger pleads for mercy but the Ruler is firm on his death. However, he agrees to allow him to remain unchained this last night of his life. When her husband has left, Heliane comes to the cell to comfort the Stranger. As she speaks to him and realizes his goodness, her feelings of pity and sadness turn to love. The Stranger tells Heliane how beautiful she is and she reveals to him her long golden hair. She then exposes her bare feet and then, finally, stands completely naked before him. He asks Heliane to give herself to him on his last night of life, but she refuses and goes to the chapel to pray for the Stranger. The Ruler returns to the cell, proposing that if the Stranger can teach Heliane to love the Ruler then he will spare his life and concede Heliane to him. Heliane returns, still naked. She is shocked to meet her husband in the cell. In anger, he orders the Stranger's death and Heliane's trial.

=== Act 2 ===
The Ruler and his messenger (also his former lover whom he has rejected) await the coming of the executioner and the members of the high court. Heliane will be tried when the six judges and the blind Chief Justice arrive. The Ruler accuses her of adultery with the Stranger. Heliane cannot deny that she stood naked before the Stranger, but she insists that she gave herself to him in thought only. The Ruler presses his dagger into her breast telling her she should kill herself. The Stranger is brought in to testify but he will not speak, wanting to be left alone for a few moments with Heliane. He kisses her and then takes the dagger and kills himself, making it impossible for the Ruler to prove that Heliane is lying. The Ruler dismisses the court and tells Heliane that she will be on trial before God: if she is innocent, as she claims, she must bring the Stranger back to life. Shocked, she agrees to undergo the trial.

=== Act 3 ===
A crowd has assembled outside of the Ruler's palace. The Judges, together with the Chief Justice, arrive to witness Heliane's attempt to bring the Stranger back to life. The messenger stirs up the crowd against Heliane as the test begins. She cries, she will not lie, admitting that she did love the young Stranger. When the Ruler sees her cry he wants to save her, but only on the condition that she will be his. Heliane resents her husband more than ever and refuses this last offer for life. The crowd drags her away to the stake where she will die. Suddenly all are shocked as thunder crashes. Just as suddenly, stars begin to appear in the sky and everyone is amazed to see the young Stranger's corpse rise, transfigured from the funeral bier. By some miracle he is alive. Heliane breaks away from the shocked crowd and runs into the arms of this Stranger whom she loves. In a fit of rage the Ruler plunges his sword into her breast. The Stranger offers a blessing to the people and banishes the ruler whose power is broken. He takes Heliane in his arms. United in their love they rise to heaven.

== Recordings ==
- Nicolai Gedda, Andreas Scholz, Anna Tomowa-Sintow, Gotthold Schwarz, Hartmut Welker, John David de Haan, et al. Conductor: John Mauceri, Berlin Radio Symphony Orchestra. 3x CD, DDD, Decca, part of the "Entartete Musik" series.
- Annemarie Kremer (soprano), Ian Storey (tenor), Aris Argiris (baritone), Katerina Hebelková (alto), Nuttaporn Thammathi (tenor), Conductor Fabrice Bollon. Philharmonisches Orchester Freiburg, Opernchor des Theater Freiburg, Extrachor des Theater Freiburg, Freiburg Bach Choir. Recorded at the Rolf-Böhme-Saal, Konzerthaus Freiburg, Germany, 20–26 July 2017. Naxos
- Video recording: Sara Jakubiak (Helene), Brian Jagde (The Stranger), Josef Wagner (The Ruler), Okka von der Damerau (The Messenger), Derek Welton (The Doorman), Burkhard Ulrich (The Blind Judge), Gideon Poppe (The Young Man), Chorus and Orchestra of the Deutsche Oper Berlin, conductor: Marc Albrecht, (stage director: Christof Loy), 2018 Deutsche Oper Berlin, Naxos DVD and BD 2019.
