= Die Fledermaus =

Comic operetta in three acts by Johann Strauss II

- Operetta by Johann Strauss II
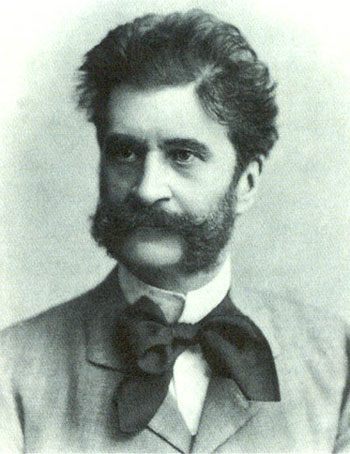
- Johann Strauss II
- Librettist: Karl Haffner; Richard Genée
- Language: German
- Based on: Gefängnis by Julius Roderich Benedix
- Premiere: 5 April 1874; Theater an der Wien, Vienna

Die Fledermaus (German: [diː ˈfleːdɐˌmaʊs], The Bat, sometimes called The Revenge of the Bat) is an operetta composed by Johann Strauss II to a German libretto by Karl Haffner and Richard Genée, which premiered in 1874.

== Background ==
The original literary source for Die Fledermaus was Das Gefängnis (The Prison), a farce by German playwright Julius Roderich Benedix that premiered in Berlin in 1851. On 10 September 1872, a three-act French vaudeville play by Henri Meilhac and Ludovic Halévy, Le Réveillon, loosely based on the Benedix farce, opened at the Théâtre du Palais-Royal. Meilhac and Halévy had provided several successful libretti for Offenbach. Le Réveillon later was adapted as the 1926 silent film So This Is Paris, directed by Ernst Lubitsch.

Meilhac and Halévy's play was soon translated into German by Karl Haffner (1804–1876), at the instigation of Max Steiner, as a non-musical play for production in Vienna. The French custom of a New Year's Eve réveillon, or supper party, was not considered to provide a suitable setting for the Viennese theatre, so it was decided to substitute a ball for the réveillon. Haffner's translation was passed to the playwright and composer Richard Genée, who had provided some of the lyrics for Strauss's Der Karneval in Rom the year before, and he completed the libretto.

== Performance history ==
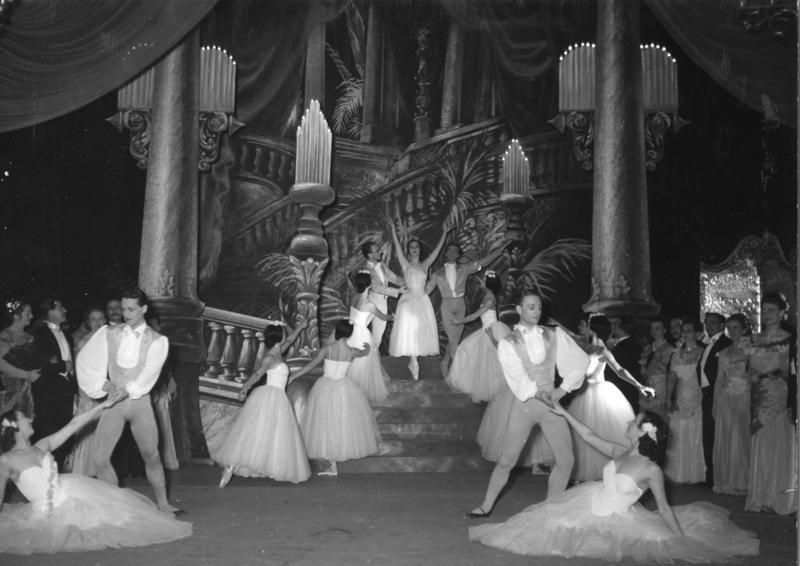
Die Fledermaus, Düsseldorf, 1954

The operetta premiered on 5 April 1874 at the Theater an der Wien in Vienna and has been part of the regular repertoire ever since.

It was performed in New York under Rudolf Bial at the Stadt Theatre on 21 November 1874. The German première took place at Munich's Gärtnerplatztheater in 1875. Die Fledermaus was sung in English at London's Alhambra Theatre on 18 December 1876, with its score modified by Hamilton Clarke.

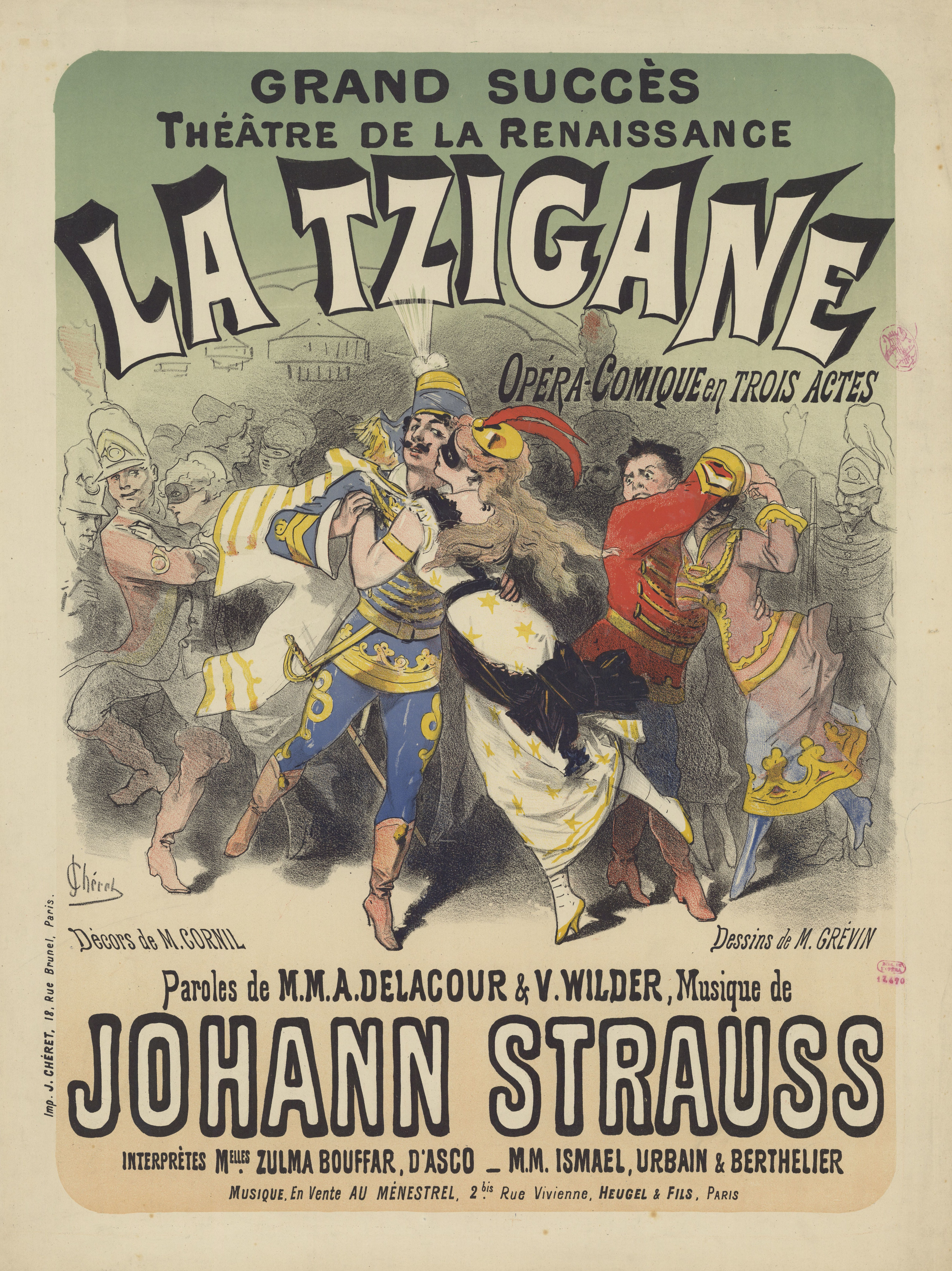
Poster for the first French production, La Tzigane, an adaptation of two Strauss operettas

When the operetta came to Paris in 1877 at the Théâtre de la Renaissance, as La Tzigane, an amalgamated adaptation of Die Fledermaus and Cagliostro in Wien with Ismaël and Zulma Bouffar in the cast, it was not a success. It was not until 1904, in a version based on Meilhac and Halevy's play, with words adapted by Paul Ferrier to the music (with Max Dearly and Ève Lavallière in the cast) did Die Fledermaus find success in Paris and enter the repertoire.

The first London performance in German did not take place until 1895. According to the archivist of the Royal Opera House, Covent Garden, "Twenty years after its production as a lyric opera in Vienna, [composer and conductor Gustav] Mahler raised the artistic status of Strauss's work by producing it at the Hamburg Opera House [...] all the leading opera houses in Europe, notably Vienna and Munich, have brightened their regular repertoire by including it for occasional performance."

The role of Eisenstein was originally written for a tenor but is now frequently sung by a baritone. The role of Orlofsky is a trouser role, usually performed by a mezzo-soprano, sometimes by a countertenor and occasionally – an octave lower – by a tenor.

The party of act 2 allows productions to insert a variety of additional entertainment acts, such as music, comedy, or dance. The lengthy drunken soliloquy by Frosch (a comedy speaking role) in act 3 also permits variety in performance.

== Roles ==
Roles, voice types, premiere cast
Role	Voice type	Premiere cast, 5 April 1874 Conductor: Johann Strauss II
Gabriel von Eisenstein	tenor/baritone	Jani Szika
Rosalinde, Eisenstein's wife	soprano	Marie Geistinger
Adele, Rosalinde's maid	coloratura soprano	Caroline Charles-Hirsch
Ida, Adele's sister	soprano	Jules
Alfred, a singer-teacher	tenor	Hans Rüdiger
Dr Falke, a notary	baritone	Ferdinand Lebrecht
Dr Blind, a lawyer	tenor	Carl Matthias Rott
Frank, a prison governor	baritone	Carl Adolf Friese
Prince Orlofsky, a Russian prince	mezzo-soprano (en travesti)	Irma Nittinger
Yvan, the prince's valet	speaking role	
Frosch, a jailer	speaking role	Alfred Schreiber
Party-goers and servants at Prince Orlofsky's (chorus)

== Synopsis ==
=== Act 1 ===
Eisenstein's apartment

Gabriel von Eisenstein, a Viennese man-about-town, has been sentenced to eight days in prison for insulting an official, partially due to the incompetence of his attorney, Dr. Blind. Adele, Eisenstein's maid, receives a forged letter, allegedly from her sister who is in the company of the ballet, but actually written by Eisenstein's friend Falke, inviting her to Prince Orlofsky's ball. She pretends the letter says that her aunt is very sick, and asks her mistress Rosalinde (Eisenstein's wife) for an evening off ("Da schreibt meine Schwester Ida"/"My sister Ida writes to me"). Falke arrives to invite him to the ball (Duet: "Komm mit mir zum Souper"/"Come with me to the supper"). Together, they recall a practical joke which Eisenstein played on Falke a few years ago, for which Falke is secretly planning a light-hearted revenge in kind. Eisenstein bids farewell to Adele and his wife Rosalinde, pretending he is going to prison (Trio: "O Gott, wie rührt mich dies!"/"Oh dear, oh dear, how sorry I am") but really intending to postpone jail for one day and have fun at the ball.

After Eisenstein leaves, Rosalinde is visited by her former lover, the singing teacher Alfred, who serenades her ("Täubchen, das entflattert ist"/"Dove that has escaped"). Frank, the governor of the prison, arrives to take Eisenstein to jail, and finds Alfred instead. In order not to compromise Rosalinde, Alfred agrees to pretend to be Eisenstein and to accompany Frank. (Finale, drinking song: "Glücklich ist, wer vergisst"/"Happy is he who forgets" followed by Rosalinde's defence when Frank arrives: "Mit mir so spät im tête-à-tête"/"In tête-à-tête with me so late", and Frank's invitation: "Mein schönes, großes Vogelhaus"/"My beautiful, large bird-cage".)

=== Act 2 ===
The Champagne Song ("King Champagne")
Performed by the Singing Sergeants of the United States Air Force Band (in English)

A summer house in the Villa Orlofsky

It transpires that Falke, with Prince Orlofsky's permission, is using the ball as a way of getting revenge on Eisenstein. Some time before, after a costume-party, Eisenstein had abandoned Falke, very drunk and dressed in a bat-costume, in the centre of town, exposing him to ridicule the next day. As part of his scheme, Falke has invited Frank, Adele, and Rosalinde to come the ball, all concealing their identities as well. Rosalinde pretends to be a masked Hungarian countess, Eisenstein goes by the name "Marquis Renard", Frank is "Chevalier Chagrin", and Adele, who has borrowed one of Rosalinde's dresses without permission, pretends she is an actress.

The ball is in progress (Chorus: "Ein Souper heut' uns winkt"/"A supper is before us") and the Prince welcomes his guests ("Ich lade gern mir Gäste ein"/"I love to invite my friends"). Eisenstein is introduced to Adele, but is confused as to who she really is because of her striking resemblance to his maid. ("Mein Herr Marquis"/"My lord marquis", sometimes referred to as "Adele's Laughing Song"). Frank arrives. He and Eisenstein, who are both posing as Frenchmen, attempt to conceal their identities by repeating common French phrases to each other, to Orlofsky's great amusement. Since neither actually knows French, both are fooled. As the party progresses, they both experience alcohol-induced good-feeling and manly camaraderie for each other.

Then Falke introduces the masked Rosalinde to the company. She convinces everyone that she is Hungarian by singing the "Czardas", a sentimental dancing-song ("Klänge der Heimat"/"Sounds from home"). During an amorous tête-à-tête, Eisenstein tries unsuccessfully to persuade the mystery-woman to unmask. She succeeds in extracting a valuable watch from her husband's pocket, something which she can use in the future as evidence of his impropriety. (Watch duet: "Dieser Anstand, so manierlich"/"Her bearing, so well-mannered"). In a rousing finale, Orlofsky makes a toast to champagne, and the company celebrates (The Champagne song: "Im Feuerstrom der Reben"/"In the fire stream of the grape"; followed by the canon: "Brüderlein, Brüderlein und Schwesterlein"/"Brothers, brothers and sisters" and the waltz finale, "Ha, welch ein Fest, welche Nacht voll Freud'!"/"Ha, what joy, what a night of delight".) Eisenstein and Frank dash off as the clock strikes six in the morning.

(Note: The "Champagne song", which is sung by the entire ensemble, should not be confused with the baritone aria "Fin ch' han dal vino" from Don Giovanni, which is often called the "Champagne aria".)

=== Act 3 ===
In the prison offices of Warden Frank

The next morning they all find themselves at the prison where the confusion increases and is compounded by the jailer, Frosch, who has profited by Warden Frank's absence to become gloriously drunk. Alfred, still in jail in Eisenstein's place, irritates the other prisoners by singing operatic arias.

Adele arrives to ask the Chevalier Chagrin (actually Frank) to sponsor her career as an actress, but Frank is not wealthy enough to do this (Melodrama; Couplet of Adele: "Spiel' ich die Unschuld vom Lande"/"If I play the innocent peasant maid"). Meanwhile, Alfred asks Frosch to summon Dr. Blind to help get him released; Frank agrees to allow this and Dr. Blind arrives. Eisenstein enters and says he has come to serve his sentence. He is surprised when Frank tells him that his cell is already occupied by a man who claims to be Eisenstein and whom Frank had arrested in Eisenstein's apartment. Frank further tells Eisenstein that the man he arrested was singing amorous songs to Rosalinde at the time of his arrest, and warmly kissed her goodbye. Enraged, Eisenstein takes Dr. Blind's wig and glasses in order to disguise himself and confront the impersonator Alfred, who Eisenstein now believes has cuckolded him. Rosalinde enters. Eisenstein takes off his disguise and accuses her of being unfaithful to him with Alfred. Eisenstein, Rosalinde, and Alfred sing a trio in which Eisenstein angrily claims the right of vengeance (Trio: "Ja, ich bin's, den ihr betrogen...Ra-ra-ra-ra-Rache will ich!"/"I'm the one who was mistreated....Ve-ve-ve-ve-vengeance is mine!"). However, Rosalinde produces his watch, and he realizes that the Hungarian mystery-woman he tried to seduce at Orlofsky's party was actually Rosalinde in disguise and that he, not she, is at fault.

Falke enters with all the guests from the party and explains that the whole thing was payback for Eisenstein's practical joke on him three years before. Eisenstein is delighted by the prank, and he begs Rosalinde to forgive him for his attempted infidelity. Rosalinde refuses at first and threatens to divorce him, but Eisenstein tells her that his misbehavior was caused by the champagne. She accepts this explanation and immediately forgives him unconditionally. Orlofsky promises to finance Adele's acting career, and the company joyfully reprises the "Champagne song" from act 2.

== Stage adaptations ==
Strauss's music has been adopted for at least two musical comedies:

- Nightbirds with lyrics by Gladys Unger, opened at the Lyric Theatre, London 30 December 1911
- Gay Rosalinda, adaptation by Erich Wolfgang Korngold, produced at the Palace Theatre, London in 1945

=== A Wonderful Night ===
The operetta was adapted by Fanny Todd Mitchell into a new English-language version titled A Wonderful Night. It opened at the Majestic Theatre on October 31, 1929. It was the first Broadway musical to open after the Wall Street crash of 1929. It was produced by the Shubert brothers. It closed on February 15, 1930 after 125 performances. It starred tenor Allan Rogers as Prince Koslofsky.

== Film adaptations ==
Die Fledermaus has been adapted numerous times for the cinema and for TV:

Year	Country	Notes	Director	Eisenstein	Rosalinde	Adele	Orlofsky	Frosch
1917	Germany	The Merry Jail (silent film)	Ernst Lubitsch	Harry Liedtke (Alex von Reizenstein)	Kitty Dewall (Alice, his wife)	Agda Nielson (Mizi, the maid)		Emil Jannings (Quabbe, the jailer)
1923	Germany	Die Fledermaus (silent film)	Max Mack	Harry Liedtke	Eva May	Lya De Putti	Ernst Hofmann	Jakob Tiedtke
1931	France/Germany	Die Fledermaus, La Chauve-Souris	Karel Lamač	Georg Alexander	Betty Werner	Anny Ondra	Iván Petrovich	Karl Etlinger
1933	Great Britain	Waltz Time	Wilhelm Thiele	Fritz Schulz	Evelyn Laye	Gina Malo	George Baker	Jay Laurier
1937	Germany	Die Fledermaus	Paul Verhoeven	Hans Söhnker	Lída Baarová	Friedl Czepa	Karel Štěpánek	Hans Moser
1945	Germany	Die Fledermaus (Released 1946)	Géza von Bolváry	Johannes Heesters	Marte Harell	Dorit Kreysler	Siegfried Breuer	Josef Egger
1955	Great Britain	Oh... Rosalinda!! – new title	Michael Powell and Emeric Pressburger	Michael Redgrave	Ludmilla Tchérina (sung by Sári Barabás)	Anneliese Rothenberger	Anthony Quayle	Oskar Sima
1955	East Germany	Swelling Melodies – new title	E. W. Fiedler	Erich Arnold	Jarmila Kšírová	Sonja Schöner	Gerd Frickhöffer	Joseph Egger
1959	West Germany	TV adaptation	Kurt Wilhelm	Friedrich Schoenfelder	Nadia Gray	Gerlinde Locker	Horst Uhse	Michl Lang
1962	Austria	Die Fledermaus	Géza von Cziffra	Peter Alexander	Marianne Koch	Marika Rökk	Boy Gobert	Hans Moser
1966	Denmark	Flagermusen – Danish title	Annelise Meineche	Poul Reichhardt	Lily Broberg	Ghita Nørby	Grethe Mogensen	Paul Hagen
1968	Denmark	Flagermusen – Danish title, TV adaptation	John Price	Poul Reichhardt	Birgitte Bruun	Ellen Winther	Susse Wold	Buster Larsen
1972	Austria	Die Fledermaus – TV adaptation	Otto Schenk	Eberhard Wächter	Gundula Janowitz	Renate Holm	Wolfgang Windgassen	Otto Schenk
1979	Soviet Union	Die Fledermaus	Yan Frid	Yury Solomin	Lyudmila Maksakova	Larisa Udovichenko	Yuri Vasilyev	Ivan Lyubeznov
1984	Great Britain	TV adaptation	Humphrey Burton	Hermann Prey	Kiri Te Kanawa	Hildegard Heichele	Doris Soffel	Josef Meinrad
1986	West Germany		Otto Schenk	Eberhard Wächter	Pamela Coburn	Janet Perry	Brigitte Fassbaender	Franz Muxeneder
1990	Great Britain		Humphrey Burton	Louis Otey	Nancy Gustafson	Judith Howarth	Jochen Kowalski	John Sessions
1997	Australia		Lindy Hume	Anthony Warlow	Gillian Sullivan	Amelia Farrugia	Suzanne Johnston	Geoff Kelso
2001	France	La Chauve-Souris – French title	Don Kent	Christoph Homberger	Mireille Delunsch	Malin Hartelius	David Moss	Elisabeth Trissenaar
2004	Ukraine		Oksana Bayrak	Aleksei Kravchenko	Olga Kabo	Marina Mayko	Nikolai Karachentsov	
