= Die Fledermaus (1972 film) =

Austrian-German film

- Directed by: Otto Schenk
- Written by: Peter Weiser, Otto Schenk
- Based on: Johann Strauss II's 1874 opera Die Fledermaus
- Produced by: Filmkunst Musikverlag Munich
- Starring: Gundula Janowitz; Eberhard Waechter; Renate Holm; Wolfgang Windgassen
- Music by: Johann Strauss II
- Release date: 1972
- Running time: 137 minutes
- Countries: Austria, Germany
- Language: German

Die Fledermaus (English: The Bat or The Revenge of the Bat) is a film adaptation of the operetta Die Fledermaus by Johann Strauss II. It was filmed in Austria, with the Vienna Philharmonic conducted by Karl Böhm and the Vienna State Opera Chorus led by Norbert Balatsch, as well as Gundula Janowitz and Eberhard Waechter as the Eisenstein couple, Renate Holm as chambermaid Adele, Erich Kunz as prison warden Frank and Wolfgang Windgassen as Prince Orlofsky in the leading roles. Otto Schenk directed it.

In contrast to Géza von Cziffra's 1962 film adaptation which represented a very free adaptation of the material, this television adaptation follows the specifications of the original much more closely. The biggest difference is that Prince Orlofsky is a tenor instead of a mezzo-soprano.

== Plot ==
Dr. Eisenstein is to serve an eight-day arrest sentence for insulting an official, but is persuaded by his friend Falke to attend Prince Orlofsky's ball as Marquis Renard instead. At the same time, Alfred, the former lover of his wife Rosalinde, appears unannounced and, so as not to compromise the latter, is arrested by prison warden Frank instead of Eisenstein.

In the evening, with the exception of Alfred and the lawyer Dr. Blind - all the protagonists at the feast of Prince Orlofsky. Eisenstein first meets Adele, his wife's maid, who is flirting with prison warden Frank, who has been identified as "Chevalier Chagrin". Eisenstein courts his masked wife Rosalinde, who pretends to be a Hungarian countess and steals his watch as proof of his infidelity. Under the influence of the champagne, Eisenstein tells the story of an earlier masked ball, at the end of which he exposed his friend Falke disguised as a bat and thus exposed himself to the ridicule of market women and street urchins. Falke declares that he has prepared his revenge.

The following morning, all the guests from the previous evening gradually arrive at the prison. Eisenstein disguised as lawyer Dr. Blind, interrogates his wife Rosalinde and Alfred about their alleged infidelity, but then has to admit his own adventure of the previous evening and is jeered at by everyone present. The plot turns out to be "revenge of the bat".

== Cast ==
- Gundula Janowitz as Rosalinde Eisenstein
- Eberhard Waechter as Eisenstein
- Renate Holm as Adele
- Wolfgang Windgassen as Prince Orlofsky
- Erich Kunz as Frank
- Waldemar Kmentt as Alfred
- Heinz Holecek as Falke
- Erich Kuchar as Dr. Blind
- Sylvia Lukan as Ida
- Otto Schenk as Frosch

== Reception ==
"Otto Schenk's sparkling production of Fledermaus culminates in the second act in a rushing hustle and bustle, a huge party, an orgy of drunk and otherwise unstable characters, led by the out-of-control Eberhard Waechter, the seductive Renate Holm, and Gundula Janowitz presenting a splendid Csárdás."
