= Alex Penda =

Bulgarian operatic soprano (born 1970)

Alexandrina Pendatchanska (Note: Bulgarian: Александрина Пендачанска, romanized: sometimes written as Pendachanska) (born 24 September 1970), better known known as Alex Penda, is a Bulgarian operatic soprano.

== Career ==
Pendatchanska was born in Sofia, Bulgaria into a family of renowned Bulgarian musicians. Her grandfather Sasha Popov was a violinist and conductor and the founder of the Sofia Philharmonic Orchestra. Her mother Valerie Popova was an internationally acclaimed soprano who sung regularly at La Scala in Milan from 1983 to 1986. She studied piano from early childhood and graduated from Bulgaria's National School of Music, where her subjects were piano and singing. Her vocal teacher was her mother, Valerie Popova.

Making her stage debut at age 17 in the role of Violetta in La traviata, she soon won the Antonín Dvořák Competition in Karlovy Vary, was placed second in the International Vocal Competition in Bilbao in 1988, and won UNISA singing competition in Pretoria in 1989.

The soprano's debut outside Bulgaria took place in Bilbao, where she sang the title role in Lucia di Lammermoor. Since 1989 she has sung in many of the most prestigious opera houses around the world, including those in Vienna, Paris, Berlin, New York (at the New York City Opera), Rome, Brussels, Washington, Hamburg, Moscow, Turin, Naples, Santa Fe, Bregenz, Monte Carlo, and Tel Aviv.

Pendatchanska performed the title role of Esclarmonde at Teatro Regio in Turin in November 1992 at the age of 22, at which time she was even younger than that of Sybil Sanderson, who created the infamously difficult role at age 24.

During the 1997–2001 operatic seasons Pendatchanska sang the role of Elisabetta in Roberto Devereux (Turin and Naples), Adina in Adina (Pesaro), Suor Angelica in Suor Angelica (Lucca), Luisa in Luisa Miller (Naples and Berlin), and in Ermione (Santa Fe and New York).

Her other operatic roles include:

- The Queen of the Night in Die Zauberflöte by Mozart, sung in Cape Town.
- Ophelia in Hamlet sung in Monte Carlo and Vienna.
- Lucia in Turin and Trieste.
- Gilda in Rigoletto for the Welsh National Opera and also for Monte Carlo.
- Violetta in La traviata in Trieste, Hamburg, and Frankfurt.
- Adalgisa in Norma at the Teatro dell'Opera di Roma.
- Parisina in Parisina for the Wexford Festival Opera and also for Lugano.
- Elena in La donna del lago for New York City Opera

Her current repertoire includes:

- Donna Anna and Donna Elvira from Don Giovanni, which she has sung in Paris, Lausanne, Houston, Lisbon, Prague, Baden-Baden, and Innsbruck.
- Vitellia in La Clemenza di Tito for Santa Fe, Lyon, and Madrid.
- Elettra in Idomeneo for Brussels.
- Elisabetta in Maria Stuarda
- Semiramide in Paris.
- The title role in Agrippina

During the summer 2014 festival season, under the name of Alex Penda, she appeared in The Santa Fe Opera's new production of Beethoven's Fidelio, singing the role of Leonore. She sang the title role in Nicola Berloffa's staging of Carmen at the Theater St. Gallen in 2014 with Ladislav Elgr as Don José, Cristina Pasaroiu as Micaëla, and Aris Argiris as Escamillo. Footage from the rehearsals was used in the documentary Loving Carmen.

Pendatchanska has worked with conductors including Riccardo Chailly, Myung-whun Chung, Charles Dutoit, Jesús López Cobos, Bruno Bartoletti, Carlo Rizzi, Ivor Bolton, Daniel Oren, René Jacobs, Vladimir Jurowski, Constantin Trinks, Nayden Todorov, Grigor Palikarov and Carlo Tenan.

== Critical reception ==
On the stage Alexandrina Pendatchanska is particularly praised for her Mozart and bel canto roles, specializing in passionate ladies such as the three Mozart queens, Vitellia, Donna Elvira and Elettra, the last which had often been cited as the definitive interpretation.

Besides being active on the stage, she also sings concert programs around the world including music festivals. Her concert repertoire includes the Requiem by Verdi, Rossini's Stabat Mater and Petite messe solennelle, and Le Roi David by Honegger.

== Recordings ==
Alexandrina Pendatchanska also has a varied discography. She has recorded operas by Glinka, Donizetti, Verdi, Rossini and Mozart. With René Jacobs she recorded for Harmonia Mundi the role of Vitellia in La Clemenza di Tito (which garnered two Grammy Award nominations 2006 for "Best Classical Recording" and "Best Opera Recording"), as well as her signature roles Donna Elvira (Don Giovanni), Elettra (Idomeneo), Agrippina (which garnered Grammy Award nominations 2013 for "Best Opera Recording") and Arminda (La finta giardiniera). Her latest CD recording is for NAXOS in the role of Semiramide in Rossini's opera of that name.

She has also recorded two operatic recitals albums, Alexandrina Pendatchanska (Capriccio) and Genuine - Dramatic Coloratura Album (Spotlight). Apart from audio recordings she has also appeared in a few operatic DVDs, including:

- Don Giovanni, with René Jacobs
- Roberto Devereux, with Alain Guingal
- I due Foscari, with Nello Santi
- Orlando Paladino, with René Jacobs
- Petite messe solennelle, with Riccardo Chailly

== Filmography ==
- Loving Carmen (Nayo Titzin, BG 2016). Documentary narrated by Ben Cross, contains footage filmed at Theater St. Gallen, with Aris Argiris, Alexandrina Pendatchanska.
