= Oceàna (opera) =

- Opera by Antonio Smareglia
- Antonio Smareglia, c.1880
- Librettist: Silvio Benco
- Language: Italian
- Premiere: 22 January 1903; La Scala, Milan

Oceàna is an opera in three acts composed by Antonio Smareglia to a libretto in Italian by Silvio Benco. It premiered at La Scala on 22 January 1903 in a performance conducted by Arturo Toscanini.

== Roles ==
Roles, voice types, premiere cast
Role	Voice type	Premiere cast, 22 January 1903 Conductor: Arturo Toscanini
Ers, a sea spirit	baritone	Rodolfo Angelini-Fornari
Init, god of the waters	tenor	Giovanni Zenatello
Nersa	soprano	Amelia Karola
Vadar, in love with Nersa	baritone	Nestore della Torre
Uls, a sea spirit disguised as an old man	bass	Oreste Luppi
Hareb, Vadar's brother	baritone	Michele Wigley

== Synopsis ==
Setting: a village in Roman Syria

A beautiful young woman, Nersa, is being wooed by the elderly Vadar. Nersa is fascinated when Ers, a sea spirit, tells her mysterious tales of life in the sea and of Init, the god of the waters. When her village decides to punish her for trying to leave, Uls (another sea spirit disguised as an old man) suggests that her punishment should be to spend three days and nights alone on the seashore. While she is there, Init appears, accompanied by his water nymphs and sirens, and courts Nersa, naming her Oceàna. Vadar and his brother, Hareb, arrive in a boat. Init orders the sirens to drive the men insane. As Hareb starts to go mad, Nersa reluctantly says farewell to the sea and returns to the village with Vadar. Although she agrees to marry Vadar, she still dreams of Init. On the day of Nersa and Vadar's wedding, Init appears and convinces Nersa to flee with him. Vadar discovers them in an embrace and decides to free Nersa from her promise of marriage, asking only that the god cure Hareb of his insanity and instead make Vadar insane. For Vadar, life has no meaning without his beloved Nersa.

== Recording ==
The 13 minute overture to Oceàna can be heard on:

- Antonio Smareglia: Ouvertures e Intermezzi – Orchestra Sinfonica Lituana di Vilnjus, Silvano Frontalini (conductor). Label: Bongiovanni 2142
