= Cristina Pasaroiu =

Romanian operatic soprano (born 1989)

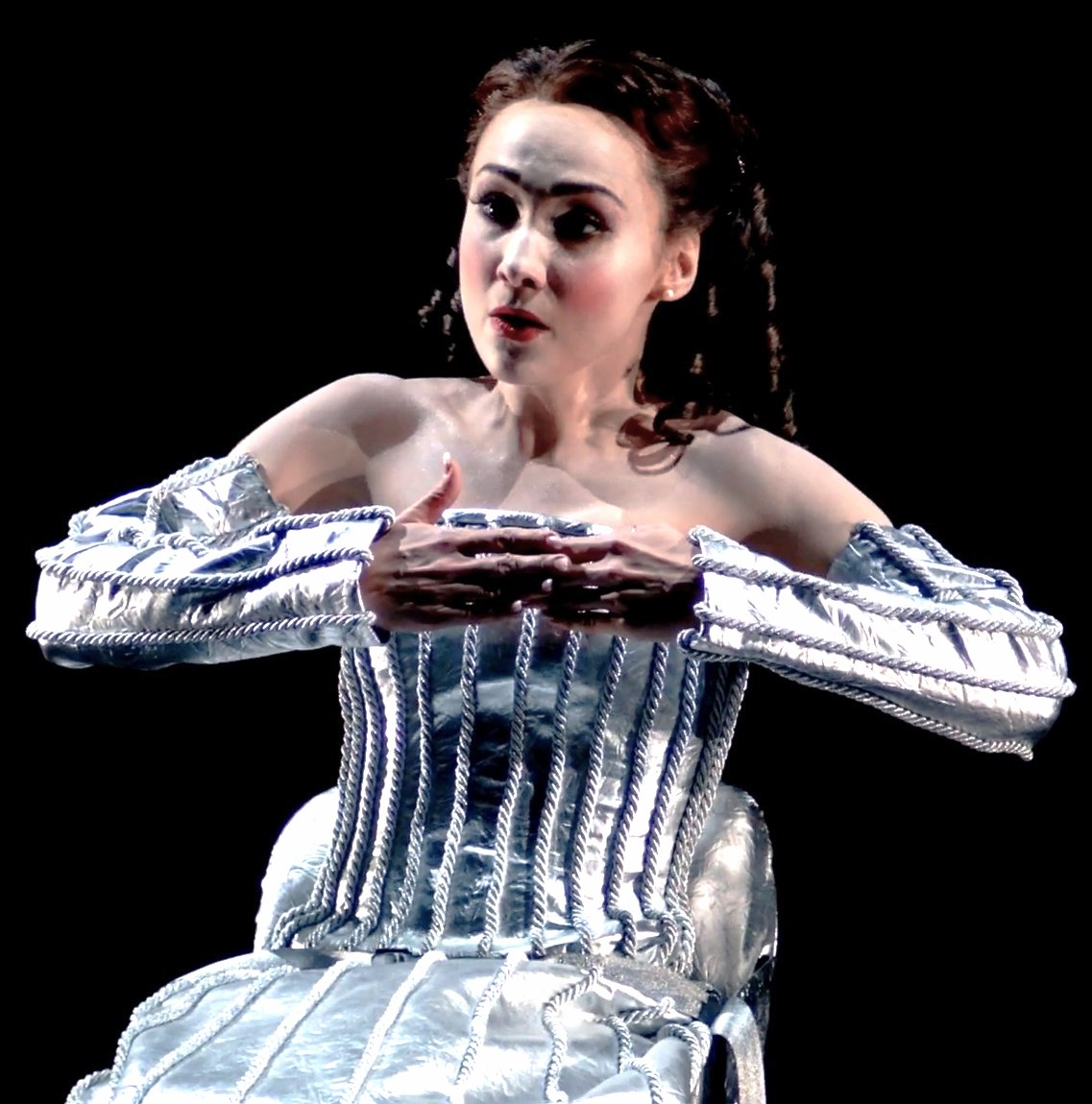
- Pasaroiu as Olympia in The Tales of Hoffmann, Deutsche Oper Berlin, 2018
- Born: Cristina-Antoaneta Păsăroiu; 17 September 1987 (age 39); Bucharest, Romania
- Education: Conservatorio Giuseppe Verdi; University of Music and Performing Arts Vienna
- Occupation: Operatic soprano

Cristina Pasaroiu (born 17 September 1987) is a Romanian operatic soprano who has performed leading roles at major European opera houses, with a focus on French repertoire such as Bizet's Micaëla, Massenet's Manon and Gounod's Juliette.

== Career ==
Born Cristina-Antoaneta Păsăroiu in Bucharest on 17 September 1987, she began voice training at age twelve. She continued her studies at the Conservatorio Giuseppe Verdi in Milan and at the University of Music and Performing Arts Vienna.

She performed in concert in the Rosenblatt Recitals in London, with the ensemble Archi della Scala in Milan, at the Teatro Regio in Parma, and the festival Klangvokal Dortmund.

She made her debut at the Teatro Comunale di Bologna as Magda in Puccini's La rondine. She appeared as Mimi in his La Bohème and as Micaëla in Bizet's Carmen, conducted by Michele Mariotti, at age 21.

Among her roles are also Musetta in La Bohème, Desdemona in Verdi's Otello, Fiordiligi in Mozart's Così fan tutte, Sylva in Emmerich Kálmán's Die Csárdásfürstin and the title role of Cilea's Adriana Lecouvreur. She is focused on French repertoire, such as Léïla in Bizet's Les pêcheurs de perles, Antonia in Offenbach's Les Contes d'Hoffmann, the title role of Massenet's Manon, Marguerite in Gounod's Faust and Juliette in his Roméo et Juliette. She appeared in the title role of Fromental Halévy's La Juive alongside Neil Shicoff, conducted by Frédéric Chaslin, at the Opéra de Nice. She also performed at the Frankfurt Opera, the Liceu in Barcelona, at the Vlaamse Oper in Antwerp and Ghent, and at the Caracalla Festival of the Rome Opera. In 2014, she sang Micaëla in Nicola Berloffa's staging at Theater St. Gallen alongside Alex Penda in the titel role, Ladislav Elgr as Don José and Aris Argiris as Escamillo. Footage from the rehearsals was used in the documentary Loving Carmen.

In 2016, she appeared as Valentine in Meyerbeer's Les Huguenots, as Micaëla in her debut at the Vienna State Opera, and as Violetta in Verdi's La Traviata at the Hessisches Staatstheater Wiesbaden. She appeared there as Manon in 2017, singing and acting although she had broken her foot in a rehearsal and had to wear boots even in bed with her lover. In 2018 she made her role debut as Liù in Turandot at the Deutsche Oper Berlin, returned to the role of Manon at the Korea National Opera in Seoul and to the Bregenz Festival as Micaëla in Carmen. In the 2018/2019 season she made her role debut as the four heroines of Les Contes d'Hoffmann in the premiere of a Laurent Pelly staging at the Deutsche Oper Berlin, causing the Financial Times to proclaim her the "star of the evening". Other engagements in the 2018/19 season included Handel's Alcina, Gilda in a new production of Rigoletto in Wiesbaden by Uwe Eric Laufenberg, and Micaëla at the Bavarian State Opera of Munich.

== Awards ==
Păsăroiu is a prize winner of several competitions, including the Jaume Aragall competition in Barcelona and in 2011 fourth prize in the international competition Neue Stimmen.

== Filmography ==
- Loving Carmen (Nayo Titzin, BG 2016). Documentary narrated by Ben Cross, contains footage filmed at Theater St. Gallen, with Aris Argiris, Alexandrina Pendatchanska.
