= Ian Storey =

English tenor

Ian Storey (born c. 1959) is an English tenor.

== Early life and training ==
He was born in Chilton, County Durham, United Kingdom. His father, a miner by profession, an amateur bass-baritone player, and his mother, an organist for the local church, fought for their son to be trained in a profession that would take him away from mining.

Storey graduated with a Bachelor of Arts with honors in furniture design from Loughborough University, Leicestershire. He later moved to New Zealand to devote himself to teaching. It was there, in Auckland and during the time off after a sports injury, that he began to study singing with Anthea Moller. On his return to the UK, he continued his singing studies with Bryan Drake and Laura Sarti in London and later with Rita Patanè and Dante Mazzola in Milan. He took classes from Carlo Cossutta in Trieste and has been coached by James Vaughan.

== Operatic career and repertoire ==
His career began in 1991 with the English opera company Opera East Productions (OEP), singing in the Male Chorus in Britten's The Rape of Lucretia and later in leading roles such as Rodolfo in La Bohème, Radamés in Aida, Don José in Carmen, Osaka in Iris by Mascagni, as well as the title roles in Peter Grimes by Britten and Faust by Gounod.

In 1993, with the patronage of Covent Garden and the Peter Moores Foundation, he studied at the National Opera Studio in London. Other sponsors funded complementary studies in Italy.

He understudied roles for Covent Garden, including Mark in Tippett's The Midsummer Marriage, Cavaradossi in Puccini's Tosca, Carlo VII in Verdi's Giovanna d'Arco and Corrado in Verdi's Il corsaro, as well as Álvaro in Verdi's La forza del destino for the Scottish Opera.

At Scottish Opera he sang Manrico in Verdi's Il trovatore, Pinkerton in Puccini's Madama Butterfly, Boris in Janáček's Káťa Kabanová and Florestan in Beethoven's Fidelio. He has also sung for other UK opera companies, such as the Welsh National Opera, Opera North and Dorset Opera, including, in addition to some of his previous roles, new roles, such as Erik from Wagner's The Flying Dutchman, Calaf from Puccini's Turandot, and Jean in Massenet's Hérodiade.

He has sung very little in London, never having performed at the English National Opera and very rarely at Covent Garden. His career has had its greatest development outside the United Kingdom, with performances at the Puccini Festival in Torre del Lago, at the Teatro Carlo Felice in Genoa, in Montpellier, Bari, Treviso, the Teatro Massimo in Palermo, Mexico City, the Berlin State Opera, the Arena di Verona, the Teatro di San Carlo in Naples, Cagliari, Bologna, Riga, Bordeaux, the Teatro Real in Madrid, the Teatre del Liceu in Barcelona, La Fenice in Venice, La Scala in Milan, the Teatro Nacional de São Carlos in Lisbon, the Bavarian State Opera in Munich, the Zurich Opera House, St. Gallen, the Washington National Opera, the Los Angeles Opera, the Teatro Regio in Turin, the Alte Oper Frankfurt, the Royal Swedish Opera in Stockholm and the Glyndebourne Festival.

Other roles he has sung are Turiddu in Pietro Mascagni's Cavalleria rusticana, Gregor in Janáček's The Makropulos Case, Steva in Janáček's Jenůfa, Alwa in Alban Berg's Lulu, the title role in Saint-Saëns's Samson et Dalila, Herman in Tchaikovsky's The Queen of Spades, Bacchus in Richard Strauss's Ariadne auf Naxos, Dick Johnson in Puccini's La Fanciulla del West, the title role in Verdi's Otello, Sergey in Shostakovich's Lady Macbeth of Mtsensk, the title role in Wagner's Tannhäuser, Tristan in Wagner's Tristan und Isolde and Dmitri in Mussorgsky's Boris Godunov.

=== La Scala's Tristan ===
Ian Storey's international career took a leap forward at the end of 2007 after the success of his performance as Tristan in Patrice Chéreau's production of Tristan und Isolde at La Scala in Milan, with musical direction by Daniel Barenboim and with Waltraud Meier as Isolde. The occasion had come about by chance, because a year earlier, while Storey was rehearsing his role as Steva in Jenůfa for La Scala, the tenor La Scala had hired to sing the role of Tristan, to be performed eight months later in the new season opener on 7 December, had unexpectedly withdrawn. With so little time, all alternatives were considered, and Storey was asked if he could travel to Berlin to audition for Barenboim. This audition proved positive, Barenboim commenting to Storey that while a singer normally needs a year to learn the role, he only had five months before rehearsals began. La Scala provided Storey with accommodation in Milan and from then on Storey began an immersion in the character, under the tutelage of James Vaughan and his team, rehearsing up to nine to ten hours a day as the rehearsal start date approached. The effort was worth it, because after his successful debut in the role, Plácido Domingo offered him the role of Siegfried in Wagner's The Ring of the Nibelung at the Washington National Opera and the title role in Verdi's Otello at the Los Angeles Opera.

This production of Tristan and Isolde was recorded on video.

== Awards ==
In 2008 Ian Storey was awarded an Honorary Doctor of Letters by Loughborough University "in recognition of his extraordinary contribution to opera".

== Recordings ==
=== Audio ===
- 1999: Lorenzo in Nozze istriane by Antonio Smareglia. Conductor: Titian Severini. Teatro Verdi in Trieste. Record label: Bongiovanni
- 2000: Steva in Jenůfa by Janáček. Conductor: Vladimir Jurowski. Teatro di San Carlo, Naples. Record label: Foné
- 2001: Alwa in Lulu by Alban Berg. Conductor: Stefan Anton Reck. Teatro Massimo in Palermo. Record label: Art Nova Classics
- 2010: Aegisthus in Elektra by Richard Strauss. Conductor: Valery Gergiev. London Symphony Orchestra and Chorus. Recorded live at the Barbican, London, January 2010. Record label: LSO Live.
- 2017: Der Fremde in Das Wunder der Heliane by Korngold. Conductor Fabrice Bollon. Philharmonisches Orchester Freiburg. Recorded at the Rolf-Böhme-Saal, Konzerthaus Freiburg, Germany, 20–26 July 2017. Record label: Naxos

=== Video ===
- 2007: Tristan in Tristan und Isolde by Richard Wagner. Conductor: Daniel Barenboim. Produced by Patrice Chéreau and recorded live at the Teatro alla Scala in Milan. Blu-ray: Virgin
- 2010: Grigory in Boris Godunov by Mussorgsky. Conductor: Gianandrea Noseda. Teatro Regio (Turin). Stage director: Andrei Konchalovsky. Recorded live on 7, 10, 13 October. Blu-ray: Opus Arte
