= Ein Walzertraum =

20th-century operetta by Oscar Straus

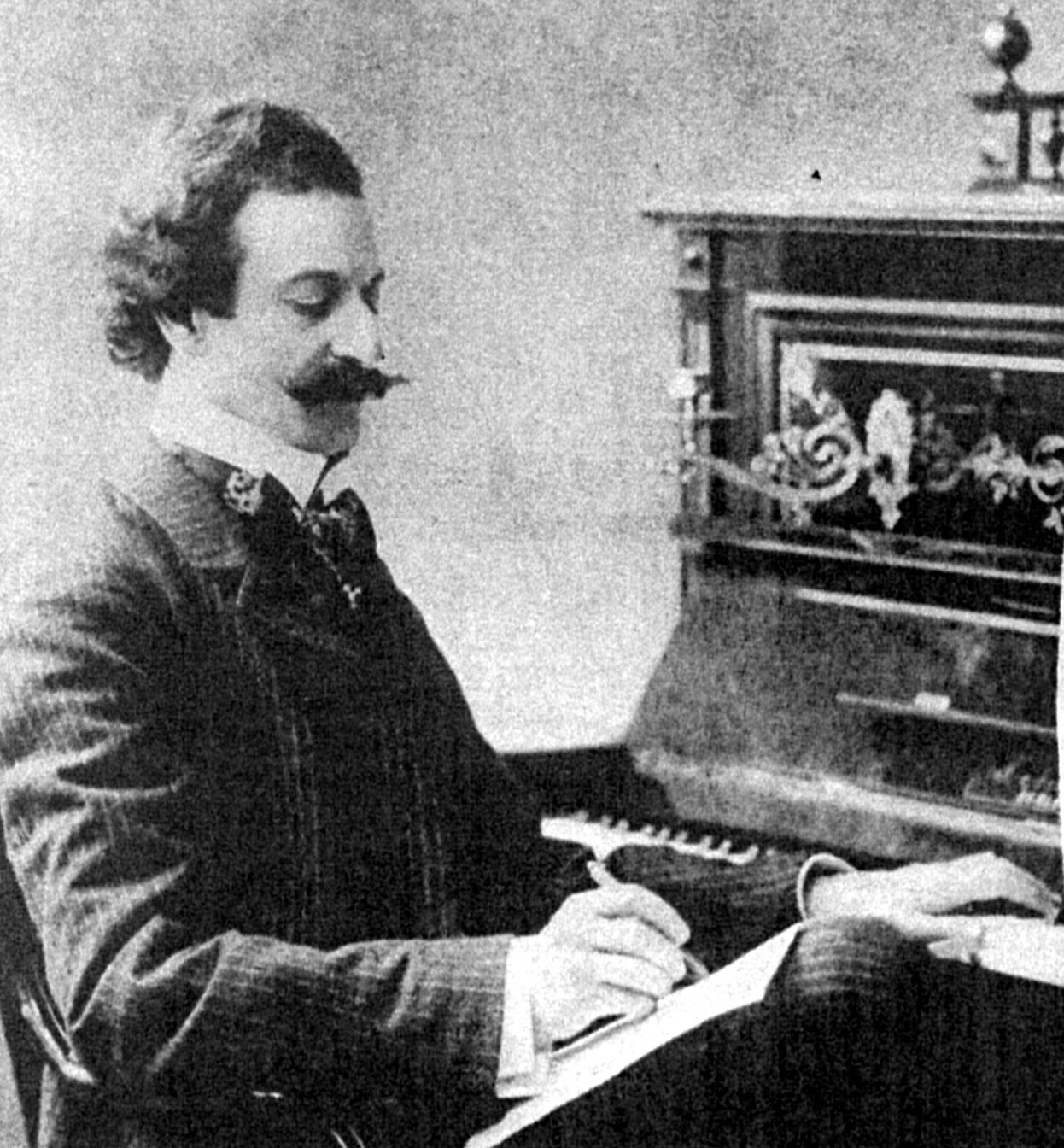
Oscar Straus

Ein Walzertraum (A Waltz Dream) is an operetta by Oscar Straus with a German libretto by Leopold Jacobson and Felix Dörmann, based on the novella Nux, der Prinzgemahl (Nux, the Prince Consort) by Hans Müller-Einigen from his 1905 book Buch der Abenteuer (Book of Adventures).

The young Jacobson presented Straus with a libretto for Ein Walzertraum at a coffee house in the Vienna Prater in 1906. Straus was inspired by the text and completed the work within 12 months for its premiere in spring 1907.

== Performance history ==
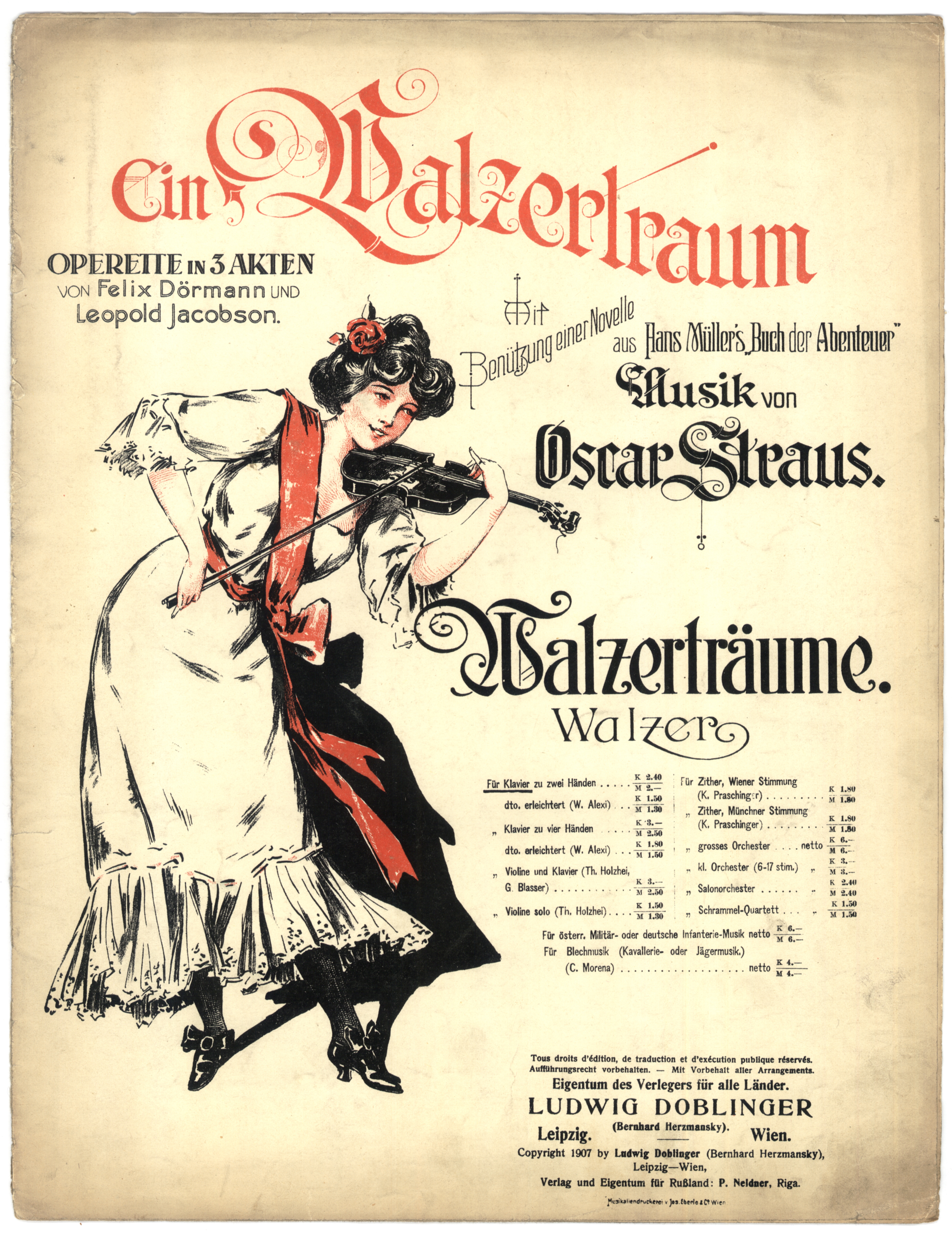
Cover

It premiered on 2 March 1907 at the Carltheater in Vienna.

== English adaptations ==
Following the success of the operetta in Vienna, productions of the work, under the name A Waltz Dream, were mounted in English for premieres at the Chestnut Street Opera House in Philadelphia on 6 January 1908, in New York City at the now-demolished Broadway Theatre on 27 January 1908 (with an English libretto adapted by Joseph W. Herbert), and in London on 7 March 1908 at the Hicks Theatre (adapted by Basil Hood, with lyrics by Adrian Ross, starring Gertie Millar, W. H. Berry and later Robert Evett, Jessie Broughton and Arthur Williams). Lily Elsie and Amy Evans starred in the 1911 revival at Daly's Theatre.

The international success of the operetta exceeded Straus's expectations, and special praise was reserved for the famous waltz theme from act 2. Straus later arranged various numbers from the operetta and included the graceful main waltz theme into a new concert waltz. The piece made Straus's international reputation, touring internationally after the Vienna, New York and London runs and enjoying many revivals. Cyril Ritchard made his debut in the chorus at age 19 when this work was performed in 1917 at Her Majesty's Theatre, Sydney, Australia. Among more modern productions, in 1991 Ohio Light Opera produced the work, and in 1992 Light Opera Works of Illinois mounted a production.

== Roles ==
Gertie Millar and Robert Evett in A Waltz Dream in 1908

Roles, voice types, premiere cast
Role	Voice type	Premiere cast, 2 March 1907 Conductor: Oscar Straus
Joachim XIII, the Prince of Flausenthurn	bass	Carl Blasel
Princess Helene, the Prince's daughter	soprano	Mizzi Zwerenz
Count Lothar. the Prince's cousin	tenor	Arthur Guttmann
Lieutenant Niki, Helene's lover and then husband	tenor	Fritz Werner
Lieutenant Montschi	baritone	Rudolf Kumpa
Friederike von Insterburg, the chief-lady-in-waiting	contralto	Therese Löwe
Franzi Steingruber, conductor of the ladies' orchestra	soprano	Helene Merviola
Fifi, owner of the cafe and Franzi's employer	soprano	Lea Gregor
Wendolin	baritone	
Sigismund	baritone	
Annerl	spoken	Vally Worth
Eduard	spoken	

== Synopsis ==
=== Act 1 ===
In the fictional state of Rurislavenstein, the scene opens in the glittering and the splendour of the Prunksaal des Schlosses Hall of the Prince of Flausenthurn. Princess Helene and Lieutenant Niki of the Army had earlier became lovers and soon were married in the splendid hall whereupon the father of the Princess, Joachim, made Niki the heir to his throne. In spite of this, Lieutenant Niki appeared to be sceptical of the prospect of being a Prince as it was not financially beneficial nor does it come with the elevated status which he sought. The marriage has also raised a few eyebrows among the courtiers as Niki was just a common soldier and the marriage has been a hasty one. Niki also distanced himself from the Prince's favour when the former acknowledged the hasty marriage and raised suggestions for a separate bedroom from the newly-wed Princess. It also appeared to the dismayed Prince that Lieutenant Niki favours his hometown of Vienna rather than the interests of the State. Lieutenant Niki then chooses to leave the palace secretly with his comrade Lieutenant Montschi for a pleasurable evening in the beer garden. Through this troubled backdrop, a scheming Count Lothar, who is envious of Niki hatches a plan of betrayal.

=== Act 2 ===
At the beer garden, Niki meets Franzi, a ladies' orchestra leader and is attracted to her. He quickly wins her heart, which she feels that only a true Wienerin (Viennese) can do. By the scheme of Count Lothar, the Prince and Princess Helene are also present in the garden, with the chambermaid Friederike von Insterburg. The Count also has eyes for Franzi, however, she gives him the cold shoulder. By that instance, Princess Helene and Franzi meet and the Princess wants to know the Wienerin who has won her heart. The main waltz theme of the Walzertraum plays and Niki dances with the Princess Helene. Franzi, who watches the entire scene with a broken heart, realises that Niki is the husband of the Princess.

=== Act 3 ===
Back at the Prunksaal des Schlosses Hall, Princess Helene discovers Niki's unhappiness at the marriage. It transpires that Niki longs for the Viennese customs he grew up with. An immediate wholesale change takes place, including a change of dress code, furniture, and cooking. A new chambermaid schooled in the Viennese customs was also installed to take charge of the domestic matters. Niki, as expected, warms to the new surroundings which comes close to his heart and soon willingly accepts Princess Helene without restrictions although he clearly misses the pretty Franzi. Franzi, however, wisely renounces her affection for Niki.

== Musical numbers (English adaptation) ==
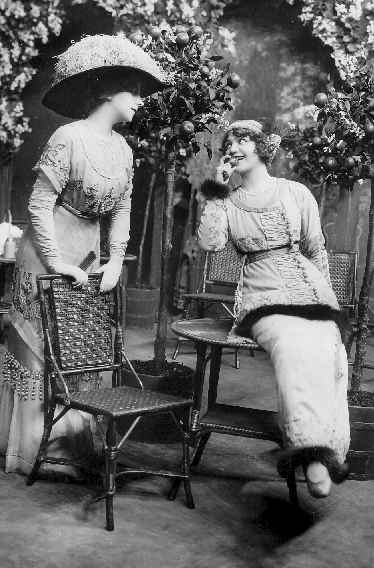
Amy Evans and Lily Elsie in A Waltz Dream

- Overture

Act 1 – Festival Hall in Prince Joachim's Castle at Flausenthurn

- No. 1 – Chorus – "Our hearts are filled with glee and festive loyalty, our Princess weds today!"
- No. 2 – Friedericke, Sigismund and Chorus – "A maiden whom Cupid had not cajoled, of icy mold, distrait and cold"
- No. 3 – Entrance March and Hymn – "The trumpets blare! Let's welcome the happy pair!"
- No. 4 – Niki – "Some men are born to rule the land"
- No. 4a – Exit March
- No. 5 – Helene and Friedericke – "Our vows exchanged we're plighted, forever linked by Fate"
- No. 6 – Friedericke, Niki and Joachim – "What a misfortune, woeful disgrace! It is too late our steps to retrace"
- No. 7 – Niki and Montschi – "The soft summer twilight was fading, I sat in the garden alone"
- No. 8 – Finale act 1 – "My dearest love, why leave me all alone!"

Act 2 – Garden Salon

- No. 9 – March and Girls' Chorus – "Come, love, don't be shy, kissing time is nigh"
- No. 10 – Franzi and Girls – "You may search the world around, nowhere will you find melody and beauty both"
- No. 11 – Niki and Franzi – "I beg you believe, sweetest maiden, that the love your charms inspire"
- No. 12 – Helene, Franzi and Friedericke – "I am seeking for information"
- No. 13 – Lothar and Franzi – "Sweet music, so the poets say, maintains a universal sway"
- No. 14 – Finale act 2 – "It is shameful! Sad mishap! Your father, caught in a trap"

Act 3 – Drawing Room in the Castle at Flausenthurn

- No. 15 – Entr'acte Gavotte
- No. 16 – Niki, Lothar and Joachim – "Oh, these bores! I wish they'd leave me"
- No. 17 – Friedericke and Franzi – "I am an humble lassie / I am a courtly dame"
- No. 18 – Finale act 3 – Niki and Helene – "Music at night gives me thrills of delight"

== Films ==
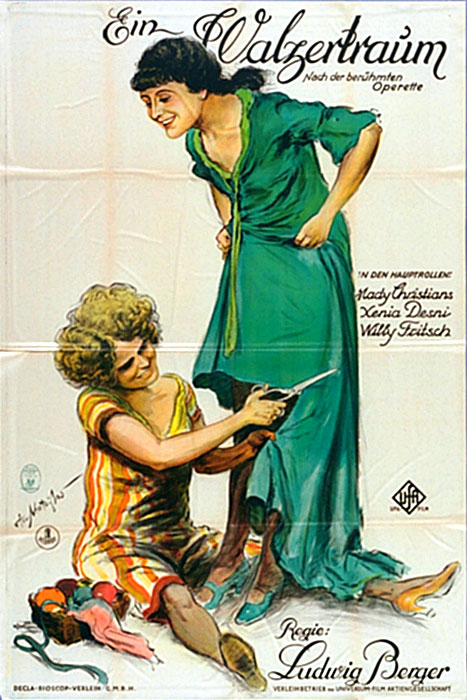
A Waltz Dream (1925)

Silent film versions of the operetta include a 1918 Hungarian film Magic Waltz directed by Michael Curtiz and the 1925 German film A Waltz Dream directed by Ludwig Berger. The operetta was adapted as the 1931 Ernst Lubitsch sound film titled The Smiling Lieutenant, starring Maurice Chevalier and Claudette Colbert. In 1969, a German television production was made.
