= Teatro Lirico Giuseppe Verdi =

Operahouse in Trieste, Italy

Coordinates: 45.651°N 13.769°E

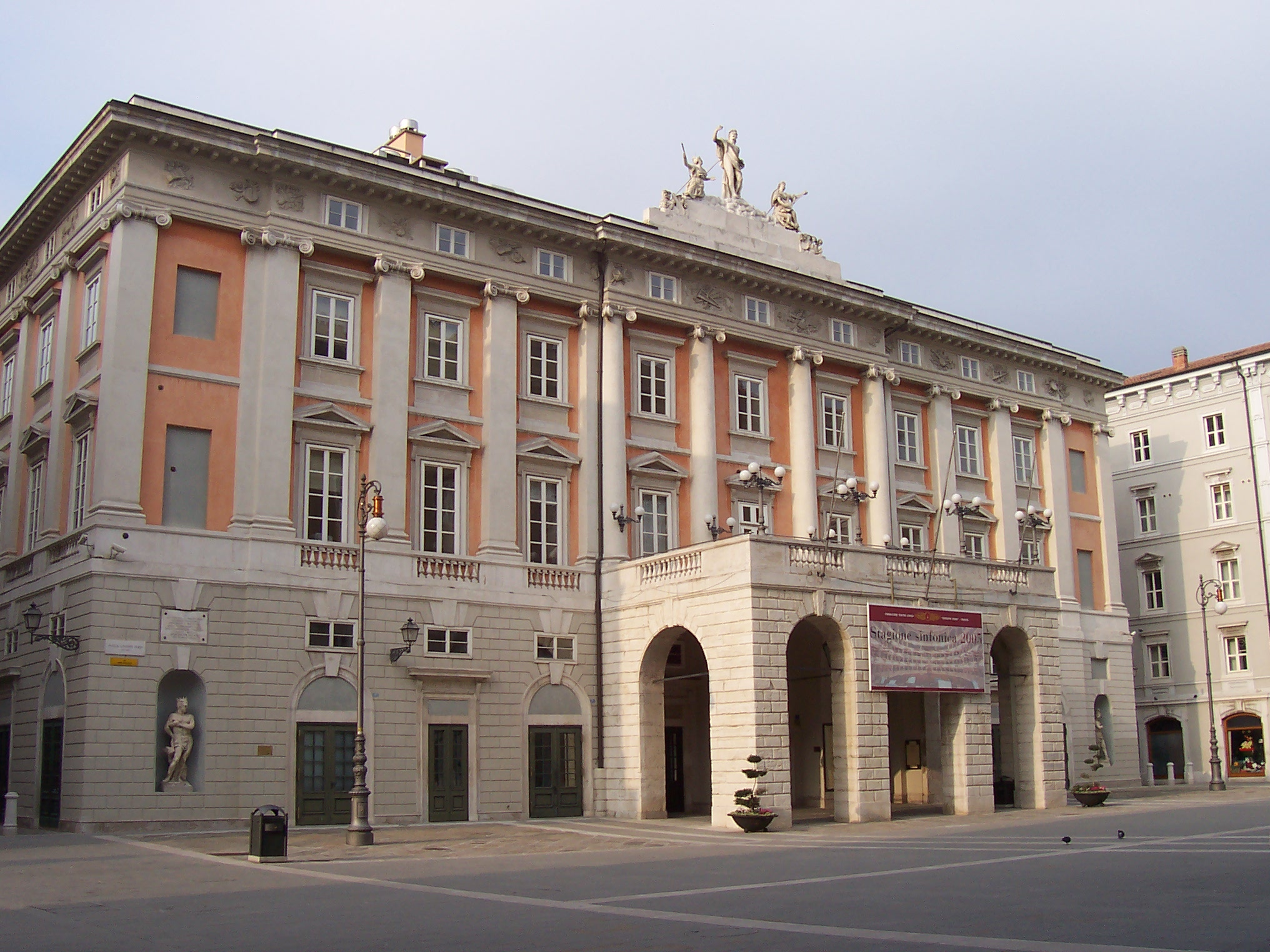
Facade of Teatro Lirico Giuseppe Verdi

The Teatro Lirico Giuseppe Verdi is an opera house located in Trieste, Italy and named after the composer Giuseppe Verdi. Privately constructed, it was inaugurated as the Teatro Nuovo to replace the smaller 800-seat "Cesareo Regio Teatro di San Pietro" on 21 April 1801 with a performance of Johann Simon Mayr's Ginevra di Scozia. Initially, the Nuovo had 1,400 seats. In 1821, it became known as the Teatro Grande.

By the end of the 18th century, the need for a new theatre in Trieste became evident. Its main theatre, the Teatro di San Pietro, had become increasingly inadequate and closed in 1800. A proposal to the Austrian Chancery from Giovanni Matteo Tommasini to build a private theatre had existed since 1795 and, in June 1798, a contract was drawn up whereby annual funding would come from the municipality and Tommasini would hold the rights to several boxes and the rights to sell others. Gian Antonio Selva, the architect of the La Fenice in Venice, was engaged, and he designed a classic horseshoe-shaped auditorium. However, his exterior designs were considered to be too plain for the Austrians who then engaged another architect, Matteo Pertsch, to solve the problem, which was accomplished by incorporating elements of Milan's La Scala opera house. The "Nuovo" became a mixture of La Fenice on the inside and La Scala on the exterior.

== History ==
Several name changes have occurred during the theatre's lifetime, the first in 1821 when it became the Teatro Grande and it was under this name that the theatre was the site of two Verdi opera premieres: Il corsaro in 1848 (featuring the soprano Giuseppina Strepponi, who Verdi married in 1859, in the leading role) and Stiffelio, a production which Verdi supervised - not without controversy - in 1850. However, before these premieres, Verdi's operas had begun to dominate the Teatro Grande's stage, followed, as the century progressed, by all the major works of the opera repertoire, including those by Puccini and Wagner.

A further name change followed in 1861 due to a change from private to public ownership. Thus, it became the Teatro Comunale and existed as such throughout the latter years of the 19th century. By 1881, seating capacity had been increased to 2,000 through the use of existing standing room spaces; but, by that December, the theatre was declared to be unsafe and it was closed for renovations, during which electricity replaced gas lighting for the reopening in 1889 with 1,000 seats.

Within hours of his death in January 1901, the theatre was once again renamed, this time to honour the memory of Giuseppe Verdi. It was extensively restored between 1992 and 1997 and re-opened with about 1,300 seats and with a Viva Verdi concert which included excerpts from many of the composer's operas. (Like the restoration of La Scala between 2001 and 2004, a temporary alternative venue was quickly created in Trieste and the Sala Tripcovich continues to offer space for chamber opera and operettas.)

A major feature of the Teatro Verdi's programming in the past 40 years, which stems from the original Austrian occupation of the city in the 19th century and the fact that Trieste did not become part of Italy until 1918, is the "International Festival of Operetta" which takes place every summer.

== Premieres ==
The theatre has seen the world premieres of the following operas:

- Ginevra di Scozia by Simon Mayr, 21 April 1801
- Annibale in Capua by Antonio Salieri 20 May 1801
- Ricciarda di Edimburgo by Cesare Pugni, 29 September 1832.
- Enrico II by Otto Nicolai, 26 November 1839
- Il corsaro by Giuseppe Verdi, 25 October 1848
- Stiffelio by Giuseppe Verdi, 16 November 1850
- Pittore e duca by Michael William Balfe, 21 November 1854.
- Nozze istriane by Antonio Smareglia, 28 March 1895
