= Roderich Benedix =

German dramatist and librettist born in Leipzig

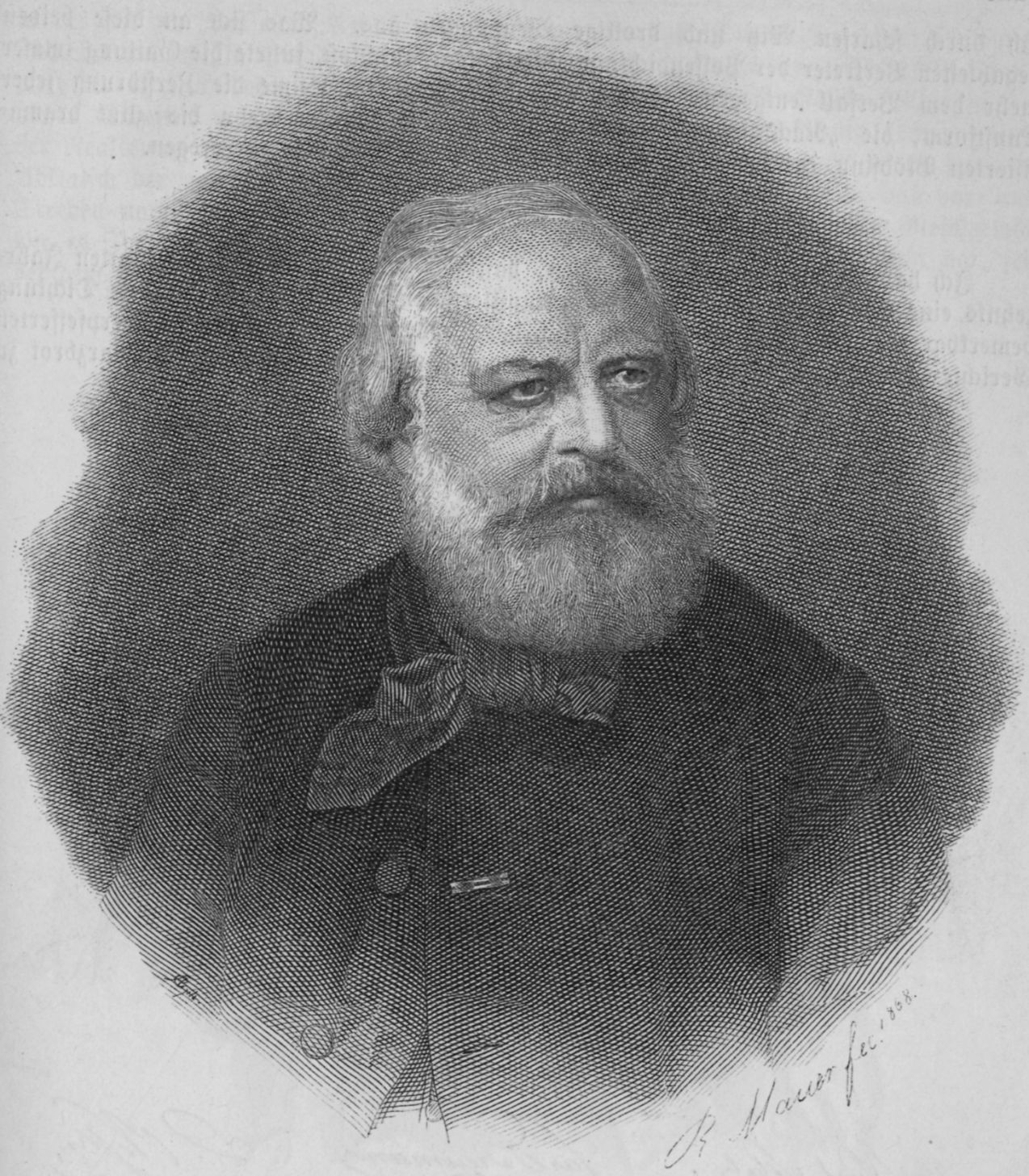
Roderich Benedix

Julius Roderich Benedix (21 January 1811 – 26 September 1873) was a German dramatist and librettist, born in Leipzig, where he was educated at Thomasschule.

He joined the stage in 1831, his first engagement being with the travelling company of H. E. Bethmann in Dessau, Köthen, Bernburg and Meiningen. Subsequently he was tenor in several theatres in Westphalia and on the Rhine, and became manager of the theatre at Wesel, where he produced a comedy, Das bemooste Haupt (1841), which met with great success.

After an engagement in Cologne, he managed the new theatre at Elberfeld (1844-1845) and in 1849 was appointed teacher on the staff of the Rhenish school of music in Cologne. In 1855 he was appointed intendant of the municipal theatre in Frankfurt-on-Main, but retired in 1861, and died in Leipzig in 1873.

Benedix's comedies, the scenes of which are mostly laid in upper middle-class life, still enjoy some popularity; the best-known are: Dr. Wespe; Die Hochzeitsreise; Der Vetter; Das Lügen; Ein Lustspiel; Das Gefängnis; Der Störenfried; Die Dienstboten; Aschenbrödel; and Die zärtlichen Verwandten. The chief characteristics of his farces are a clear plot and bright, easy and natural dialogue. Among his more serious works are: Bilder aus dem Schauspielerleben (Leipzig, 1847); Der mündliche Vortrag (Leipzig, 1859-1860); Das Wesen des deutschen Rhythmus (Leipzig, 1862) and, posthumously, Die Shakespearomanie (1873), in which he attacks the extreme adoration of the British poet.

Benedix's Gesammelte dramatische Werke ("Collected Dramatic Works") appeared in 27 vols. (Leipzig, 1846-1875); a selection under the title Volkstheater in 20 vols. (Leipzig, 1882); and a collection of smaller comedies as Haustheater in 2 vols. (l0th edition, Leipzig, 1891); see Benedix's autobiography in the Gartenlaube for 1871.
