= Pamela Coburn =

American operatic soprano (born 1959)

- Born: 29 March 1952 (age 73); Dayton, Ohio
- Education: Juilliard School
- Occupation: Operatic soprano
- Organizations: Vienna State Opera; Zürich Opera
- Awards: ARD International Music Competition 1980; Metropolitan Opera Auditions 1982

Pamela Coburn (born 29 March 1959) is an American operatic soprano. She has performed leading roles internationally, including regular performances at the Vienna State Opera, the Zürich Opera, the Metropolitan Opera, and the Salzburg Festival. She has also recorded with notable conductors, including Nikolaus Harnoncourt and Carlos Kleiber.

== Career ==
Born in Dayton, Ohio, Coburn grew up in Cincinnati where her mother was a piano teacher and a choral conductor. Coburn graduated from DePauw University in 1974 where she studied with Ed White. She studied at the Eastman School in Rochester, and the Juilliard School. She moved to Germany in 1980 and won the ARD International Music Competition the same year. She won the Metropolitan Opera National Council Auditions in 1982.

Her career was promoted by Elisabeth Schwarzkopf. She was a member of the Bavarian State Opera from 1982 to 1987 and often returned as a guest. She was Rosalinde in Die Fledermaus by Johann Strauss in a performance with this company which was captured on video. At the Vienna State Opera, she appeared as Fiordiligi in Mozart's Così fan tutte, as the Countess in his Le nozze di Figaro, and as Ellen in Britten's Peter Grimes, a role which she also performed at the Maggio Musicale Fiorentino and in Munich. She sang Pamina in Mozart's Die Zauberflöte at the Opéra de Marseille (France) in 1988 and also appeared as the Countess at the Salzburg Festival in 1991 and at the Metropolitan Opera. Her roles have included Cleopatra in Handel's Giulio Cesare, Elvira in Mozart's Don Giovanni, Elettra in his Idomeneo, and the Marschallin in Der Rosenkavalier by Richard Strauss.

Coburn recorded Mozart's Die Zauberflöte, conducted by Nikolaus Harnoncourt in a production of the Zürich Opera. In 1990, she recorded Mozart's L'oca del Cairo conducted by Peter Schreier. She has made many other recordings in both opera and concert.
