= Antonio Smareglia =

Italian composer (1854–1929)

Antonio Smareglia circa 1880

Antonio Smareglia (5 May 1854 – 15 April 1929) was an Italian opera composer.

== Life ==
Antonio Smareglia was born in Pola, in the Istrian peninsula, then part of the Austrian Empire. In the house where he was born in Via Nettuno, there is now a small museum of his life and work.

His father Francesco Smareglia from Pola was Italian, his mother Giulia Stiglich from Lovran was Croatian.

The composer chose to set his most famous opera, Nozze istriane, in his grandfather's village, Dignano d'Istria.

Smareglia married Maria Jetti Polla, and they had five children. He became blind at the age of 46. Since then he composed his music dictating to his sons, Ariberto and Mario, and to his students and friends including Primo dalla Zonca, Gastone Zuccoli, and Vito Levi.

Smareglia died in Grado in 1929.

== Works ==
- Caccia lontana (a one-act dramatic sketch, a student work, 1879)
- Preziosa (opera, 1879)
- Bianca da Cervia (opera, 1882)
- Re Nala (opera, 1887)
- Il vassallo di Szigeth (opera, 1889)
- Cornill Schutt (revised as Pittori Fiamminghi, opera, 1893)
- Nozze istriane (opera, 1895)
- La falena (opera, 1897)
- Oceàna (opera, 1903)
- Abisso (opera, 1914)
