= Roberta Peters =

American opera singer

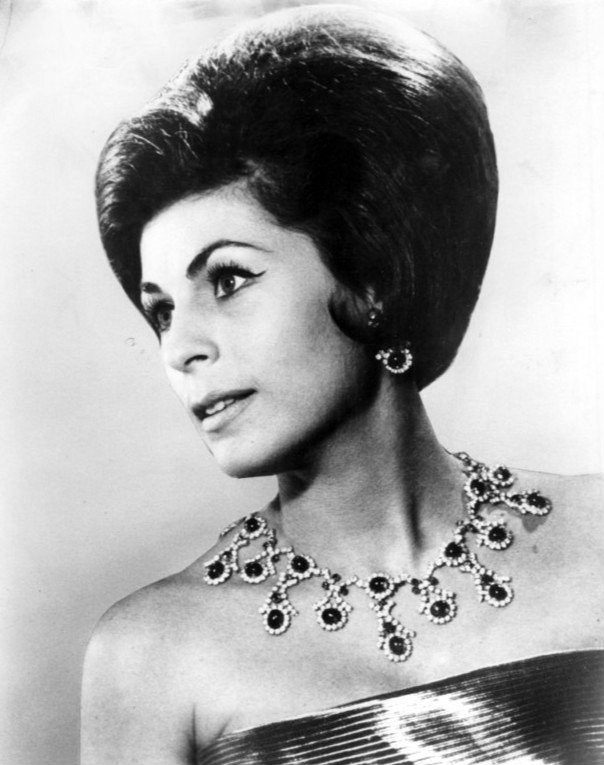
Roberta Peters in 1974

Roberta Peters (May 4, 1930 – January 18, 2017) was an American coloratura soprano.

One of the most prominent American singers to achieve lasting fame and success in opera, Peters is noted for her 35-year association with the Metropolitan Opera Company in New York, among the longest such associations between a singer and a company in opera. She was awarded the National Medal of Arts in 1998.

== Early life and career ==
Peters was born Roberta Peterman in The Bronx, New York City, the only child of Ruth (née Hersch), a milliner, and Solomon Peterman, a shoe salesman. Her family was Jewish. Encouraged by tenor Jan Peerce, she started her music studies at age 13 with William Herman, a voice teacher known for his exacting and thorough teaching method. Under Herman's training, Peters studied the French, German and Italian languages and practiced singing scales from a clarinet method. After six years of training, Herman introduced her to impresario Sol Hurok, who arranged for an audition with Rudolf Bing, general manager of the Metropolitan Opera. Bing asked her to sing the Queen of the Night's second aria from The Magic Flute (with its four Fs above high C), several times, listening from all parts of the hall to make sure she could fill the hall with sound. He scheduled her to sing the role in February 1951.

Peters however made her debut earlier than planned. On November 17, 1950, Bing phoned her asking if she could step in to replace Nadine Conner, who was ill, as Zerlina in Don Giovanni. Peters knew the role, but had not yet ever performed on stage or even sung with a full orchestra; nevertheless, she accepted. Fritz Reiner was the conductor that night. Despite a reputation for being distant and reserved, Reiner made a point of coming to Peters's dressing room to encourage her and guided her through the performance. Her performance was received with great enthusiasm, and her career was established.

Combining an attractive voice with sparkling coloratura agility and good looks, Peters became a favorite of American audiences and a great proponent of opera for the masses. She quickly established herself in the standard soubrette and coloratura repertoire. Her roles at the Met included Susanna in The Marriage of Figaro; Despina in Così fan tutte; the Queen of the Night in The Magic Flute; Amore in Gluck's Orfeo ed Euridice; Marzeline in Beethoven's Fidelio; Rosina in The Barber of Seville; Adina in L'elisir d'amore; Norina in Don Pasquale; Oscar in Un ballo in maschera; Nanetta in Falstaff; Olympia in The Tales of Hoffmann; Sophie in Der Rosenkavalier; Zerbinetta in Ariadne auf Naxos; and Adele in Die Fledermaus. She later added lyric-coloratura roles such as Amina in La sonnambula, Lucia in Lucia di Lammermoor and Gilda in Rigoletto, the last being her farewell role at the Met in 1985.

Peters also appeared frequently with the Cincinnati Opera, as well as in numerous cities around the United States while on tour with the Met. Over the years, she expanded her repertoire to include roles such as Lakmé, Juliette in Roméo et Juliette, Massenet's Manon, and occasionally performing Violetta in La traviata, and Mimì in La bohème.

Peters also appeared abroad as early as 1951, when she sang at the Royal Opera House in London, in Balfe's The Bohemian Girl, conducted by Sir Thomas Beecham. From the mid-1950s onwards, she appeared in several opera houses in Italy, the Vienna State Opera, the Salzburg Festival, and the Bolshoi in Moscow, in 1972.

Peters was as popular on television as on the stage. She appeared regularly on such programs as The Voice of Firestone and The Tonight Show. On the Sunday night CBS variety program The Ed Sullivan Show, Peters was its most frequent guest, appearing a record 65 times. She also appeared in several television commercials, including a memorable entry in American Express' "Do You Know Me?" campaign, in which she hailed a taxi at the top of her voice.

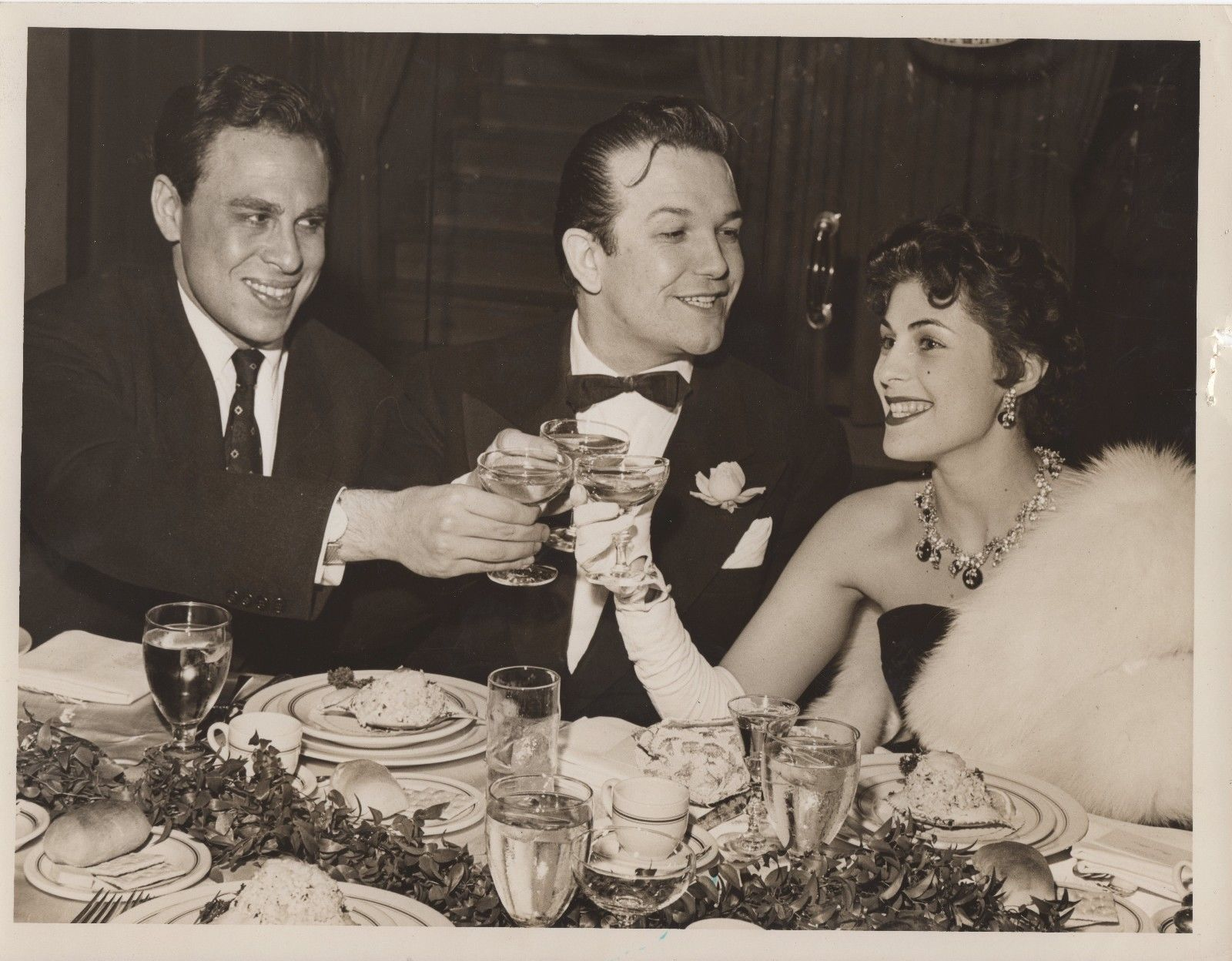
Roberta Peters (right) dining with George London (left) and Fernando Corena

Peters also had an extensive career as a recitalist, appearing in concert halls throughout the United States. Early in her career in 1962, she performed before an audience of over 13,000 at the popular outdoor "Italian Night" concert series at Lewisohn Stadium in New York under the direction of conductor Alfredo Antonini.

Later in her career she added operetta and musical theater to her repertoire, appearing in The Merry Widow, and The King and I. She also recorded Rodgers and Hammerstein's Carousel with Alfred Drake. Peters never officially retired and gave occasional recitals later in life.

== Personal life and death ==
Peters was briefly married to baritone Robert Merrill in 1952, later admitting she had fallen in love with the voice and not the man. The two divorced amicably, remained friends and continued to perform together in opera and recitals. She married Bertram Fields in 1955. Their marriage produced two sons. Fields died in 2010.

Peters died of Parkinson's disease on January 18, 2017, at age 86.

== Discography ==
=== Studio opera recordings ===
Composer	Opera (year of recording, label)	Other singers	Chorus, orchestra, conductor
Donizetti	Lucia di Lammermoor (1957, RCA Victor)	Jan Peerce, Philip Maero, Giorgio Tozzi	Teatro dell'Opera di Roma, Erich Leinsdorf
Gluck	Orfeo ed Euridice (1957, RCA Victor)	Lisa Della Casa, Risë Stevens	Teatro dell'Opera di Roma, Pierre Monteux
Mozart	Così fan tutte, sung in English (1952, Columbia)	Eleanor Steber, Blanche Thebom, Richard Tucker, Guarrera, Alvary	Metropolitan Opera, Fritz Stiedry
Mozart	The Magic Flute (1964, Deutsche Grammophon)	Evelyn Lear, Fritz Wunderlich, Dietrich Fischer-Dieskau, Franz Crass	Berlin Philharmonic, Karl Böhm
Mozart	The Marriage of Figaro (1958, RCA Victor)	Giorgio Tozzi, Lisa Della Casa, George London, Rosalind Elias, Fernando Corena	Vienna Philharmonic, Erich Leinsdorf
Rossini	The Barber of Seville (1958, RCA Victor)	Cesare Valletti, Robert Merrill, Fernando Corena, Giorgio Tozzi	Metropolitan Opera, Erich Leinsdorf
Strauss	Ariadne auf Naxos (1958, RCA Victor)	Leonie Rysanek, Sena Jurinac, Jan Peerce, Walter Berry	Vienna Philharmonic, Erich Leinsdorf
Verdi	Rigoletto (1956, RCA Victor)	Jussi Björling, Robert Merrill, Giorgio Tozzi	Teatro dell'Opera di Roma, Jonel Perlea

=== Studio recital recordings ===
Title	Composers/works	Label, year	Conductor/accompanist
Youngest Member of a Great Tradition	Donizetti, Bellini	RCA Victor, 1954	Cellini
Famous Operatic Arias	Rossini, Donizetti, Verdi, Auber, Delibes	RCA Victor, 1956	Bellezza, Perlea
In Recital	Bach, Handel, Scarlatti, Debussy, Ravel, Schumann, Strauss	RCA Victor, 1962	George Trovillo, piano
Sing the Popular Music of Leonard Bernstein (with Alfred Drake)	On the Town, West Side Story, Candide, Wonderful Town	Pye Command, 1965	Enoch Light
Singt Lieder von Richard Strauss & Claude Debussy	Debussy, Strauss	BASF, 1973	Leonard Hokanson, piano
Raisins and Almonds	Folks songs arr. by David Krivoshei	Audio Fidelity, 1975	Sam Brown and John Pizzarelli, guitars

=== Live Metropolitan Opera broadcasts released on CD by Sony ===
Composer	Opera (performance date)	Other singers	Conductor
Donizetti	L'elisir d'amore (March 5, 1966)	Bergonzi, Guarrera, Corena	Schippers.
Mozart	Le nozze di Figaro (January 28, 1961)	Amara, Miller, Siepi, Borg	Leinsdorf.
Offenbach	Les contes d'Hoffmann (December 3, 1955)	Amara, Stevens, Tucker, Singher	Monteux.
Verdi	Un ballo in maschera (December 10, 1955)	Milanov, Anderson, Peerce, Merrill	Mitropoulos.
Verdi	Rigoletto (February 22, 1964)	Dunn, Tucker, Merrill, Giaiotti	Cleva.

=== Videography ===
Composer	Opera (year of recording, label)	Other singers	Chorus, orchestra, conductor
Donizetti	Lucia di Lammermoor (excerpt), in The Metropolitan Opera Centennial Gala (1983, Deutsche Grammophon)	Dano Raffanti, Brian Schexnayder, Julien Robbins, Loretta Di Franco, Robert Nagy	Metropolitan Opera, Richard Bonynge
