= William Lewis (tenor) =

American operatic tenor and academic (1931–2026)

William L. Lewis (November 23, 1931 – August 21, 2026) was an American operatic tenor and academic.

== Life and career ==
William Lewis was born on November 23, 1931. He was educated at the University of Colorado, Texas Christian University and New York University. He began his career as a writer and an athlete before deciding to pursue a career in opera. He began his voice training under Karl Kritz and Arthur Faguy Coté in Fort Worth, followed by studies with Susan Seton and Hulda and Luigi Rossini in New York. In the summer of 1951 he attended the Music Academy of the West. He made his professional opera debut in 1953 with Fort Worth Opera as Rinuccio in Puccini's Gianni Schicchi. Two years later he won the Metropolitan Opera's Audition of the Air competition (precursor to the National Council Auditions). Lewis made his debut at the Metropolitan Opera as Narraboth in Salome on March 1, 1958, and subsequently sang in 234 performances in his 35 years with the company. In 1975 he made his debut at San Francisco Opera as Steuermann and Erik in The Flying Dutchman and has sung in sixteen different productions with the company in subsequent seasons. In 1981 he made his debut at the Salzburg Festival in the title role of Offenbach's The Tales of Hoffmann, returning there for the following four years in such roles as Arbace in Idomeneo and the First Geharnischter in The Magic Flute. In 1990 he made his debut at the Teatro Lirico in the world premiere of Azio Corghi's Blimunda.

Although he sang in a wide operatic repertory ranging from Mozart to Wagner, Lewis often sang in 20th century works. He portrayed Mattan in the world premiere of Hugo Weisgall's opera Athaliah on February 17, 1964 at Philharmonic Hall, New York. At the Met he was Andres and Drum Major in Wozzeck (1959, 1974) Aegisth in Elektra (1970), Steva in Jenůfa (1974), Alwa in Lulu (1977), Oedipus in Oedipus Rex (1983), and Red Whiskers in Billy Budd (1989). At San Francisco Opera he was Steva in Jenůfa, Albert Gregor in The Makropulos Affair, Boris in Katya Kabanova, Frank Sargeant in Angle of Repose, and Sergei in Lady Macbeth of Mtsensk. He sang Pollux in Richard Stauss' rarely performed 1940 opera Die Liebe der Danae in a concert performance at Lincoln Center in January 2000. Amongst the roles he has created are Bill in Samuel Barber's A Hand of Bridge (Spoleto, June 7, 1959), Riccardo III in Flavio Testi's Riccardo III (La Scala, January 27, 1987), and Frank Sargeant in Andrew Imbrie's Angle of Repose (San Francisco Opera, November 6, 1976). William Lewis wrote the libretto for Earl Wild's Easter oratorio Revelations as well as singing the role of St. John in its world premiere, conducted by the composer. Broadcast on ABC on April 22, 1962, Revelations was the first oratorio commissioned by a television company.

Lewis previously held the Frank C. Erwin, Jr. Centennial Professorship in Opera at the University of Texas at Austin where he was also the director of the Studio Ensemble of the Butler Opera Center. He taught at the Austrian-American Mozart Academy in Salzburg, which he founded in 1995, and at the Franco-American Vocal Academy in Périgord, France.

He can be seen on DVD in the Metropolitan's 1984 production of Zandonai's Francesca da Rimini, opposite Renata Scotto, Plácido Domingo, and Cornell MacNeil.

Lewis died on August 21, 2026, at the age of 94.

== Recordings ==
- Music of Samuel Barber – A Hand of Bridge, Op. 35 (William Lewis (tenor), Philip Maero (baritone), Patricia Neway (soprano), Eunice Alberts (alto); conductor: Vladimir Golschmann; Symphony of the Air; Robert De Cormier Singers). Recorded New York City, 1960. Label: Vanguard Classics 125 (CD)
- Hector Berlioz: Les Troyens (Chester Watson (bass), Regina Resnik (soprano), Martial Singher (baritone), Frances Wyatt (mezzo-soprano), William Lewis (tenor), John Dennison (baritone), Kenneth Smith (bass), Regina Sarfaty (mezzo-soprano), Glade Peterson (tenor), Eleanor Steber (soprano), Richard Cassilly (tenor); conductor: Robert Lawrence.) Recorded at Carnegie Hall, New York City, December 29, 1959, and January 12, 1960. Label: Vai Audio
- Leoš Janáček: Jenůfa (Soňa Červená (mezzo-soprano), Sena Jurinac (soprano), Willard White (bass), Elisabeth Söderström (soprano), John Del Carlo (baritone), Gwendolyn Jones (mezzo-soprano), Sara Ganz (soprano), Susan Quittmeyer (mezzo-soprano), Pamela South (soprano), William Lewis (tenor); San Francisco Opera Orchestra and Chorus.) Recorded at the War Memorial Opera House, San Francisco, October 1, 1980. Label: Gala
- Richard Strauss: Die Liebe der Danae, Op. 83 (Hugh Smith (tenor), William Lewis (tenor), Lisa Saffer (soprano), Michael Hendrick (tenor), Lauren Flanigan (soprano), Tamara Mesic (soprano), Jane Jennings (soprano), Mary Phillips (mezzo-soprano), Peter Coleman-Wright (baritone), Elisabeth Canis (mezzo-soprano); conductor: Leon Botstein; American Symphony Orchestra.) Recorded: Avery Fisher Hall, Lincoln Center, January 16, 2000. Label: Telarc.
- Virgil Thomson: The Mother of Us All (Karen Beck, Sondra Stowe, Jimmie Lu Null, William Lewis, Steven Loewengart, Thomas Parker, Marla McDaniels, D'Artagnan Petty, Stephen Bryant, Ashley Putnam, et al.; Conductor: Raymond Leppard; Santa Fe Opera Orchestra and Chorus.) Recorded in Santa Fe, New Mexico, 1977. Label: New World Records

== Videography ==
- The Metropolitan Opera Centennial Gala, Deutsche Grammophon DVD, 00440-073-4538, 2009
