= John Massaro (conductor) =

John Massaro (born 1957) is an American conductor, opera director, composer, and pianist. Massaro is the co-founder and current artistic director of the Phoenix Metropolitan Opera.

== Career ==
Massaro began his career in California working as an accompanist and coach for the Los Angeles Opera Repertory Theatre. He coached Lieder repertoire with the great soprano Elisabeth Schwarzkopf at the Britten-Pears School in Aldeburgh, the Frankfurt Opera and also at her home in Zurich. After moving to New York, he became a coach for several of the members of the Metropolitan Opera Young Artist Development program. During his time in New York, Massaro had the fortune of working closely with many wonderful singers and conductors including Leonard Bernstein, assisting him with his last opera A Quiet Place. During this time, Massaro began to expand his work into the field of conducting. He met Zubin Mehta for whom he served as a conducting assistant during a production of Puccini's Madama Butterfly with the Israel Philharmonic.

In 1998, Massaro became the chorus master and assistant conductor for Arizona Opera. While there he conducted several highly acclaimed productions. In 2002, while still maintaining his position with Arizona Opera, Massaro became associate conductor of the Phoenix Symphony. He made his debut with the orchestra conducting a 9/11 memorial concert which included his own arrangement of the National Anthem.

In 2005, Massaro made his Carnegie Hall debut conducting a production of Mozart's Requiem.

In 2006, Massaro was invited as a guest conductor with the Symphony of the Southwest for their 50th Anniversary Season. That same year, Massaro guest conducted the Arizona Masterworks Chorale and the South Bohemian Chamber Philharmonic Orchestra in Kraków, Prague, Ceske Budejovice (Czech Republic), and Vienna in celebration of the Year of Mozart.

In 2006, Massaro started his own opera company, the Phoenix Metropolitan Opera (PMO), with his wife, opera singer Gail Dubinbaum. Massaro conducted the company's first production, Puccini's La Boheme, in December 2008 and conducted performances of Verdi's Aida and Puccini's Tosca during the 2008-2009 season.

Massaro has also been the musical director for several regional theaters, including Phoenix Theater and the Black Theatre Troupe (BTT). He has been the recipient of an AriZoni as music director for Blues in the Night with BTT.

As a recitalist, Massaro has accompanied several artists including his wife, Gail Dubinbaum, throughout the United States and Canada. He is also an award-winning composer and arranger, a producer of choral CDs and was previously a member of the Board for arts organizations across the country including ART and Arizonans for Cultural Development.
