= The Metropolitan Opera Centennial Gala =

Televised concert celebrating the Metropolitan Opera's one hundred year anniversary

- Deutsche Grammophon DVD, 00440-073-4538
- Genre: Opera
- Directed by: Kirk Browning
- Country of origin: United States
- Original languages: English, French, German and Italian

Production
- Producers: Michael Bronson; Clemente d'Alessio
- Running time: 230 minutes

Original release
- Network: PBS
- Release: 1983

The Metropolitan Opera Centennial Gala was a televised concert, lasting more than eight hours, that New York City's Metropolitan Opera staged on 22 October 1983 to commemorate the hundredth anniversary of its first performance. A 230-minute selection of excerpts from the concert was released on home media.

== Background ==
The Metropolitan Opera's first performance was given on 22 October 1883 at its former home on the junction of Broadway and 39th Street in New York City: a staging of Charles Gounod's Faust starring Italo Campanini in the title role and Christine Nilsson as Marguerite. With the one hundredth anniversary of that occasion chancing to fall on a Saturday, the Met chose to commemorate its centenary with a two-part gala comprising a matinée at 2 p.m. and an evening session at 8 p.m.

More than seventy singers were invited to participate, chosen either for their eminence or their long association with the house. Performing on a series of sets created by the most distinguished designers in the Met's history, they sang arias, duets and ensembles from an eclectic range of operas as well as a few items drawn from other genres. There were also contributions from the Met's chorus and resident ballet company as well as some purely orchestral selections.

The entire event was broadcast live on both radio and television in the United States and in some other countries. The US television broadcast was supported by a grant from the Texaco Philanthropic Foundation, Inc., with supplementary help from the Charles E. Culpeper Foundation, Inc., and the National Endowment For the Arts. The production of Deutsche Grammophon's DVD of the gala was supported by the Charles A. Dana Foundation.

== Deutsche Grammophon DVD chapter listing ==
=== Disc 1: matinée session ===
- 1 (0:44) Opening credits

Set design for Les Mamelles de Tirésias by David Hockney (b. 1937)

Bedřich Smetana

Prodaná nevěsta (The Bartered Bride, Prague, 1866), with a libretto by Karel Sabina

- 2 (7:21) Overture, conducted by James Levine

Giacomo Puccini, posthumously completed by Franco Alfano

Turandot (Milan, 1926), with a libretto by Giuseppe Adami and Renato Simoni after Turandot (1762) by Carlo Gozzi

- 3 (6:57) "In questa reggia", with Éva Marton (Turandot), conducted by James Levine

Wolfgang Amadeus Mozart

Le nozze di Figaro ("The marriage of Figaro", K. 492, Vienna, 1786), with a libretto by Lorenzo da Ponte after La folle journée, ou le Mariage de Figaro ("The mad day, or the marriage of Figaro", 1784) by Pierre Beaumarchais

- 4 (7:24) "E Susanna non vien! ... Dove sono i bei momenti", with Kiri Te Kanawa (La Contessa Almaviva), conducted by James Levine

Giuseppe Verdi

Otello (Milan, 1887), with a libretto by Arrigo Boito after The Tragedy of Othello, the Moor of Venice (?1603) by William Shakespeare

- 5 (5:04) "Dio! Mi potevi scagliar", with James McCracken (Otello), conducted by James Levine

Gioachino Rossini

Il barbiere di Siviglia, ossia L'inutile precauzione ("The barber of Seville, or The useless precaution", Rome, 1816), with a libretto by Cesare Sterbini after Le barbier de Séville (1775) by Pierre Beaumarchais

- 6 (5:13) "La calunnia è un venticello", with Ruggero Raimondi (Basilio), conducted by Richard Bonynge

Gaetano Donizetti

Lucia di Lammermoor (Naples, 1835), with a libretto by Salvadore Cammarano after The Bride of Lammermoor (1819) by Sir Walter Scott)

- 7 (5:13) "Chi mi frena in tal momento?", with Dano Raffanti (Edgardo), Brian Schexnayder (Enrico), Roberta Peters (Lucia), Julien Robbins (Raimondo), Loretta Di Franco (Alisa) and Robert Nagy (Arturo), conducted by Richard Bonynge

Gioachino Rossini

Semiramide (Venice, 1823), with a libretto by Gaetano Rossi after Sémiramis by Voltaire, a play based on the legend of Semiramis of Assyria

- 8 (8:27) "Bel raggio lusinghier", with Joan Sutherland (Semiramide), conducted by Richard Bonynge

Set design for act 2 of Arabella by Günther Schneider-Siemssen

Pietro Mascagni

Iris (Rome, 1898), with a libretto by Luigi Illica

- 9 (10:40) Prelude: "Son io! Son io la vita", with the Metropolitan Opera Chorus, conducted by David Stivender

Richard Strauss

Der Rosenkavalier ("The knight of the rose", Op. 59, Dresden, 1911), with a libretto by Hugo von Hofmannsthal after Les amours du chevalier de Faubles by Jean-Baptiste Louvet de Couvrai and Monsieur de Pourceaugnac (1669) by Molière

- 10 (7:56) "Mir ist die Ehre widerfahren", with Frederica von Stade (Octavian) and Judith Blegen (Sophie), conducted by Jeffrey Tate

Charles Gounod

Roméo et Juliette (Paris, 1867), with a libretto by Jules Barbier and Michel Carré after Romeo and Juliet (circa 1593) by William Shakespeare

- 11 (13:18) "Va! Je t'ai pardonné... Nuit d'hyménée", with Catherine Malfitano (Juliette) and Alfredo Kraus (Roméo), conducted by Jeffrey Tate

Gaetano Donizetti

L'elisir d'amore ("The elixir of love", Milan, 1832), with a libretto by Felice Romani after that written by Eugène Scribe for Le philtre (1831) by Daniel Auber

- 12 (5:49) "Una furtiva lagrima", with Nicolai Gedda (Nemorino), conducted by James Levine

Giuseppe Verdi

Ernani (Venice, 1844), with a libretto by Francesco Maria Piave after Hernani (1830) by Victor Hugo

- 13 (7:54) "Surta è la note... Ernani! Ernani, involami", with Anna Tomowa-Sintow (Elvira), conducted by James Levine

Richard Strauss

Der Rosenkavalier

- 14 (6:17) "Hab mir's gelobt", with Elisabeth Söderström (Marschallin), Kathleen Battle (Sophie) and Frederica von Stade (Octavian), conducted by James Levine

Giuseppe Verdi

Otello

- 15 (13:30) "Già nella notte densa", with Plácido Domingo (Otello) and Mirella Freni (Desdemona), conducted by James Levine

=== Disc 2: evening session ===
- 1 (0:25) Opening

Set design for act 2 of La bohème by Franco Zeffirelli

Ludwig van Beethoven

Fidelio (Op. 72, Vienna, 1805), with a libretto by Joseph Sonnleithner from the French of Jean-Nicolas Bouilly

- 2 (15:59) Overture: "Leonore III", conducted by Leonard Bernstein

Umberto Giordano

Andrea Chénier (Milan, 1896), with a libretto by Luigi Illica based on the life of the poet André Chénier

- 3 (10:09) "Vicino a te s'acqueta l'irrequieta anima", with José Carreras (Andrea Chénier) and Montserrat Caballé (Maddalena), conducted by James Levine

Claude Debussy

L'enfant prodigue ("The prodigal son", Paris, 1884), with a text by Édouard Guinand

- 4 (6:34) "L'année en vain chasse l'année", with Ileana Cotrubas (Lia), conducted by John Pritchard

Set design by Robert O'Hearn

Camille Saint-Saëns

Samson et Dalila (Op. 47, Weimar, 1877), with a libretto by Ferdinand Lemaire after the story of Samson and Delilah in Chapter 16 of the Book of Judges in the Old Testament

- 5 (8:23) Bacchanale, with Linda Gelinas (dancer), Ricardo Costa (dancer) and the Metropolitan Opera Ballet, conducted by James Levine

Giuseppe Verdi

Nabucco (Milan, 1842), with a libretto by Temistocle Solera after Antonio Cortese's 1836 ballet version of a play by Auguste Anicet-Bourgeois and Francis Cornu that was in turn based on the Book of Jeremiah and the Book of Daniel in the Old Testament

- 6 (13:37) "Donna, chi sei?", with Renato Bruson (Nabucco) and Grace Bumbry (Abigaille), conducted by Thomas Fulton

Set design for Die Zauberflöte by Marc Chagall

Charles Gounod

Faust (Paris, 1859), with a libretto by Jules Barbier and Michel Carré from Carré's play Faust et Marguerite, after Faust: Eine Tragödie ("Faust, a tragedy", 1808) by Johann Wolfgang von Goethe

- 7 (4:00) "Alerte! Ou vous êtes perdus!", with Nicolai Ghiaurov (Méphistophélès), Katia Ricciarelli (Marguerite) and William Lewis (Faust), conducted by James Levine

Giacomo Puccini

Madama Butterfly (Milan, 1904), with a libretto by Luigi Illica and Giuseppe Giacosa after Madame Butterfly (1898) by John Luther Long, in turn based on reminiscences of Long's sister, Jennie Correll, and Madame Chrysanthème (1887) by Pierre Loti

- 8 (11:54) "Bimba dagli occhi pieni di malia", with Giuliano Ciannella (Pinkerton) and Leona Mitchell (Ciò-Ciò-San), conducted by James Levine

Gioachino Rossini

L'italiana in Algeri ("The Italian girl in Algiers", Venice, 1813), with a libretto by Angelo Anelli after his libretto for L'italiana in Algeri (1808) by Luigi Mosca

- 9 (10:11) "Pria di dividerci de voi, signore", with Edda Moser (Elvira), Diane Kesling (Zulma), David Rendall (Lindoro), Gail Dubinbaum (Isabella), Ara Berberian (Mustafà), John Darrenkamp (Haly), Sesto Bruscantini (Taddeo) and members of the Metropolitan Opera Chorus, conducted by James Levine

Camille Saint-Saëns

Samson et Dalila

- 10 (8:50) "Mon cœur s'ouvre à ta voix", with Marilyn Horne (Dalila), conducted by James Levine

Richard Wagner

Tristan und Isolde (WWV 90, München, 1865), with a libretto by Wagner after Tristan by Gottfried von Strassburg (d. circa 1210)

- 11 (11:06) "Wie lachend sie mir Lieder singen", with Birgit Nilsson (Isolde), conducted by James Levine

Traditional Swedish folk song

- 12 (3:29) "Fjorton år tror jag visst att jag var" ("When I was seventeen"), with Birgit Nilsson

Giuseppe Verdi

Un ballo in maschera ("A masked ball", Rome, 1859), with a libretto by Antonio Somma after Eugène Scribe's libretto for Daniel Auber's Gustave III, ou Le bal masqué (1833)

- 13 (10:37) "Teco io sto" – "Gran dio!", with Luciano Pavarotti (Riccardo) and Leontyne Price (Amelia), conducted by James Levine

Patty Hill and Mildred J. Hill (attributed), with a text attributed to Preston Ware Orem and Mrs R. R. Forman

- 14 (1:28) "Happy birthday to you" (1893), with the Company
- 15 (1:27) Closing credits

== Personnel ==
=== Artists ===
- Kathleen Battle, soprano
- Ara Berberian, bass
- Judith Blegen, soprano
- Sesto Bruscantini, baritone
- Renato Bruson, baritone
- Grace Bumbry, mezzo-soprano
- Montserrat Caballé, soprano
- José Carreras, tenor
- Giuliano Ciannella, tenor
- Ileana Cotrubas, soprano
- John Darrenkamp, baritone
- Plácido Domingo, tenor
- Gail Dubinbaum, mezzo-soprano
- Loretta Di Franco, soprano
- Mirella Freni, soprano
- Nicolai Gedda, tenor
- Nicolai Ghiaurov, bass
- Marilyn Horne, mezzo-soprano
- Kiri Te Kanawa, soprano
- Diane Kesling, mezzo-soprano
- Alfredo Kraus, tenor
- William Lewis, tenor
- Catherine Malfitano, soprano
- Éva Marton, soprano
- James McCracken, tenor
- Leona Mitchell, soprano
- Edda Moser, soprano
- Robert Nagy, tenor
- Birgit Nilsson, soprano
- Luciano Pavarotti, tenor
- Roberta Peters, soprano
- Leontyne Price, soprano
- Dano Raffanti, tenor
- Ruggero Raimondi, bass-baritone
- David Rendall, tenor
- Katia Ricciarelli, soprano
- Julien Robbins, bass-baritone
- Brian Schexnayder, baritone
- Elisabeth Söderström, soprano
- Frederica von Stade, mezzo-soprano
- Joan Sutherland, soprano
- Anna Tomowa-Sintow, soprano
- Raymond Gniewek, concertmaster
- The Metropolitan Opera Orchestra
- The Metropolitan Opera Chorus
- Roberto Costa, dancer
- Linda Gelinas, dancer
- The Metropolitan Opera Ballet
- Donald Mahler, ballet director
- Leonard Bernstein, conductor
- Richard Bonynge, conductor
- Thomas Fulton, conductor
- James Levine, conductor
- John Pritchard, conductor
- David Stivender, conductor and chorus master
- Jeffrey Tate, conductor

=== Metropolitan Opera personnel ===
- Charles Riecker, gala coordinator
- Phebe Berkowitz, stage director
- Bruce Donnell, stage director
- David Kneuss, stage director
- Leslie Koenig, stage director
- Pamela McRae, stage director
- Paul Mills, stage director
- David Sell, stage director
- Joan Dornemann, prompter
- William Vendice, prompter
- Stephen R. Berman, stage manager
- Stephen A. Brown, stage manager
- Tom Connell, stage manager
- Stanley Levine, stage manager
- Chris Mahan, stage manager
- William McCourt, stage manager
- Gil Wechsler, lighting designer
- Sander Hacker, master electrician
- Stephen Diaz, master carpenter
- Arthur Ashenden, properties master
- Nina Lawson, wig and hair stylist
- Victor Callegari, make-up artist
- Millicent Hacker, wardrobe mistress

=== Broadcast personnel ===
- Michael Bronson, executive producer
- Clemente d'Alessio, producer
- Kirk Browning, director
- Karen Adler, associate producer
- Alan Skog, associate director
- John Leay, engineer-in-charge
- Jay David Saks, audio director
- Mark Schubin, transmission consultant
- Paul C. York, senior technician
- Emmett Loughran, technical director
- Bill King, audio supervisor
- Mel Becker, audio engineer
- Michael Shoskes, audio engineer
- Robert M. Tannenbaum, audio engineer
- William Steinberg, video engineer
- Bill Akerlund, camera operator
- Juan Barrera, camera operator
- Jim Covello, camera operator
- John Feher, camera operator
- Manny Gutierrez, camera operator
- Jay Millard, camera operator
- Jake Ostroff, camera operator
- David Smith, camera operator
- Ron Washburn, handheld camera operator
- Alan Buchner, video recording engineer
- Paul Ranieri, video recording engineer
- Karen McLaughlin, electronic graphics
- Kim Anway, television stage manager
- Gerry Crosland, television stage manager
- Kevin Tracy, television stage manager
- Martha Yates, television stage manager
- Howard Heller, score reader
- John Rice, production assistant
- Vivienne de Stefano, production assistant
- Alfred Muller, post-production (Nexus Productions)
- Unitel Mobile Video, production facilities

=== DVD production personnel ===
- Burkhard Bartsch, project manager
- Veronika Holek, project coordinator
- Johannes Müller, producer, msm-Studios GmbH, München
- Hermann Enkemeier, screen designer, msm-Studios
- Markus Ammer, video encoding and authoring, msm-Studios
- Sven Mevissen, mSurround upmixing and encoding, msm-Studios
- Monica Ling, subtitles
- Eva Reisinger, booklet editor
- Merle Kersten, booklet art director

== Critical reception ==
=== Reviews ===
Donal Henahan reviewed the gala in The New York Times on 24 October 1983. Financial considerations, he wrote, had led the Metropolitan Opera to stage a concert which, including intermissions, ran for some eleven hours. The result was that "there were many stretches of unremarkable singing by minor or obscure artists". Indeed, "there were so many obscure names or unfamiliar faces that the listener had to keep diving into the program to learn their identities, and even then was seldom the wiser". Every opera company needed singers who, although well schooled and competent, were more or less anonymous, but it was questionable whether such artists should figure prominently in what was a once-in-a-lifetime jamboree. The Met's brisk stage management had not helped matters by hustling singers through their contributions without allowing the customary encores or floral tributes, or even more than a few ovations. It was disappointing to spend a long time at an event such as this without finding oneself shedding a nostalgic tear.

This was not to say that the Met had not done "a magnificent job of hugging itself". Dotted amongst the gala were many moments that were "thrilling" and even "euphoric".

Éva Marton was "galvanizing" in Turandot's "In questa reggia". Ruggero Raimondi was "wickedly funny" in Basilio's "La calunnia". Joan Sutherland's "glittering" "Bel raggio lusinghier" was the most ecstatic item of the entire event, and the most enthusiastically applauded.

The Met's chorus played only a small part in the proceedings, but acquitted themselves well in the Prelude and "Hymn to the sun" from Mascagni's Iris. Catherine Malfitano and Alfredo Kraus were "touching" in a duet from Gounod's Roméo et Juliette. Nicolai Gedda was "excitingly ardent" in "Una furtive lagrima".

In the trio from the concluding pages of Der Rosenkavalier, Kathleen Battle and Frederica von Stade sang "delectably", and Elisabeth Söderström was able to present a three-dimensional portrait of the Feldmarschallin despite having only a few minutes in which to do so. Mirella Freni and Plácido Domingo were "affecting" in a love duet from Otello. Preceded by a "somewhat ludicrous caricature of opera ballet" in which the Met's dancers enacted the Bacchanale from Samson et Dalila, Renato Bruson and Grace Bumbry performed a duet from Nabucco that was particularly enjoyable. Bruson was the epitome of cool serenity, but Bumbry sang electrifyingly in a voice that sounded "richer and more rested" than it had for a considerable while.

It was after the final intermission, with midnight approaching, that the gala truly melted hearts. The curtain rose to reveal twenty-five of the Met's most distinguished former luminaries seated at the back of the stage like jurors in a vocal competition. Among them were Helen Jepson, Dorothy Kirsten, Zinka Milanov, Jarmila Novotná, Bidu Sayão, Eleanor Steber, Risë Stevens, Ferruccio Tagliavini, Cesare Valletti and Ramón Vinay. Their presence endowed the concert with a feeling of historical significance that it had thitherto lacked. It was worth the price of one's ticket just to watch the expressions on their faces as they listened to their successors singing in front of them.

Leona Mitchell and Giuliano Ciannella sang the nuptial duet from Madama Butterfly, and the last of three laudable selections from Rossini came in the form of a "delectable exhibition of ... ensemble precision" in the finale to act 1 of L'italiana in Algeri. Marilyn Horne then lifted the occasion onto a new level of feeling and drama in a "sumptuous" rendition of "Mon cœur s'ouvre à ta voix", after which, to the manifest delight of the audience, she offered a wordless but eloquent embrace to Risë Stevens, the pre-eminent Dalila of her era.

Birgit Nilsson, in a voice that betrayed her sixty-five years yet was still something to marvel at, performed Isolde's Narrative and Curse. One of her admirers was so overcome that an usher had to restrain him from invading the stage with a bouquet. In the evening's only encore, Nilsson then offered a Swedish folk song which, she explained, had been a favourite of her compatriot namesake, Christine Nilsson, who had been Faust's Marguerite on the opening night of the old Met in 1883.

Leontyne Price and Luciano Pavarotti delivered a culminating, "soaring" love duet from Un ballo in maschera, the tenor "in clarion voice", the soprano more slender of form than of late but "never in recent years ... more voluptuous or freer" in her singing. But neither of them was likely to linger in the memory as vividly as Horne putting her arms around Stevens, or Nilsson's simple melody from her homeland. It was episodes such as these that were "the real stuff that opera galas are made of".

Joseph McLellan reviewed the gala on Laserdisc in The Washington Post on 31 May 1985. It was, he wrote, "the most spectacular event in the history of opera". From the very first note of the Bartered bride overture in the middle of the afternoon to Luciano Pavarotti and Leontyne Price duetting in Verdian ecstasy in the small hours of the morning, "it was operatic caviar". No previous concert had brought together such a dazzling constellation of opera stars for a single event. The quality of the performances was uneven, but the best of them were "stratospheric". Nothing like this gala had ever been presented before

Pioneer's pair of Laserdiscs omitted the gala's weaker items and abbreviated singers' comings and goings. The audio quality that they offered far outclassed that of PBS's broadcast. Collectors who enjoyed concerts of operatic excerpts sung by first class artists were sure to find Pioneer's release the most important issue of the year, and maybe even of the decade.

The gala was also reviewed in Gramophone, Opera Quarterly, Richard M. Jacobs's and Ed Schwartz's Music Videodiscs: An Annual Guide, Rebecca Krafft's and Brian O'Doherty's The Arts on Television, 1976–1990 and Douglas Pratt's The Laser Video Disc Companion and Doug Pratt's DVD Video Guide.

=== Accolades ===
The gala was recognized several times in the Emmy Awards of 1984. In the Performing Arts division of the Daytime Awards, the award for Outstanding Program Achievement was won by Michael Bronson and Clemente D'Alessio, and in the Outstanding Individual Achievement category, James Levine won the award for Music, Kirk Browning was nominated for the award for Directing and Jay David Saks won the award for Audio. In the Outstanding Individual Achievement – Classical Music/Dance Programming category of the Primetime Awards, Kirk Browning was nominated for the award for Directing, and James Levine won the award for Performance.

== Broadcast and home media history ==
Both the afternoon and evening segments of the gala were broadcast in their entirety live on PBS television on 22 October 1983. The gala was also broadcast on radio, and, via satellite, to Europe.

All home media releases of the gala provide the same 230-minute selection of excerpts from it, with a 4:3 aspect ratio and NTSC colour. In 1985, Pioneer Artists released this edition on a pair of CLV (constant linear velocity) Laserdiscs (catalogue number PA-84-095) with CD-quality digital stereo audio and an accompanying booklet. In 1989, Bel Canto Paramount Home Video issued it on a pair of VHS videocassettes (catalogue number 2364) with stereo audio and with liner notes by Martin Mayer. In 1998, Pioneer Classics issued it on a DVD with Dolby Digital compressed stereo audio and English-only subtitles. Pioneer's disc was accompanied by an eight page leaflet including four photographs and essays on the Met's history by Frank E. Taplin and Anthony A. Bliss, as well as notes on each item in the concert by Charles Rizzuto.

In 2009, Deutsche Grammophon supplanted Pioneer's DVD with a two-disc issue (catalogue number 00440-073-4538), one DVD being dedicated to the afternoon segment of the gala and one to its evening session. DG's Region 0 DVDs offer both uncompressed PCM stereo audio and an ersatz 5.1-channel DTS surround sound upmix, with subtitles in Chinese, English, French, German, Spanish and – although only for items sung in that language – Italian. DG's 16-page insert booklet includes two photographs and an essay by Richard Evidon in English, French and German.

== Gallery of artists ==
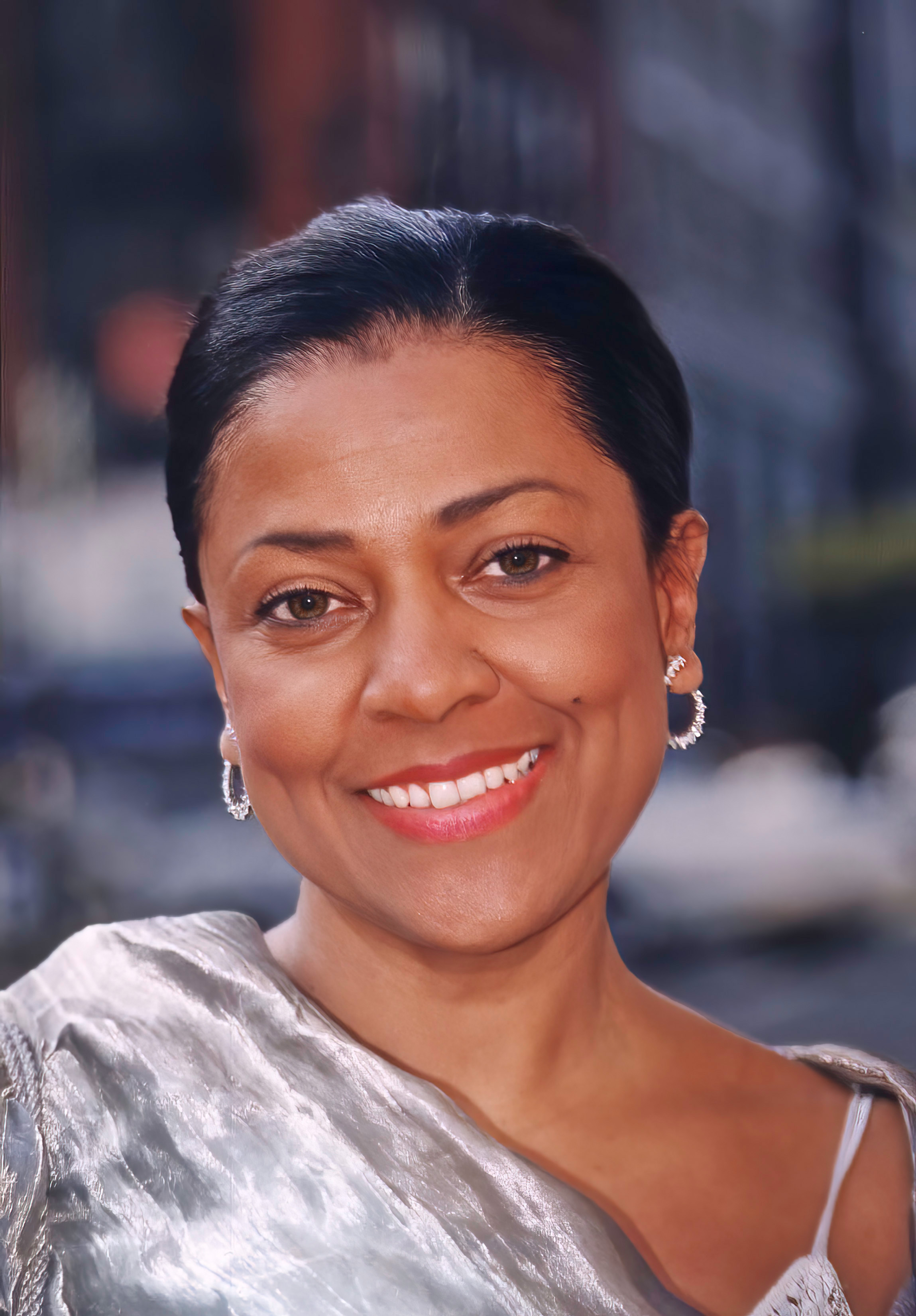
Kathleen Battle

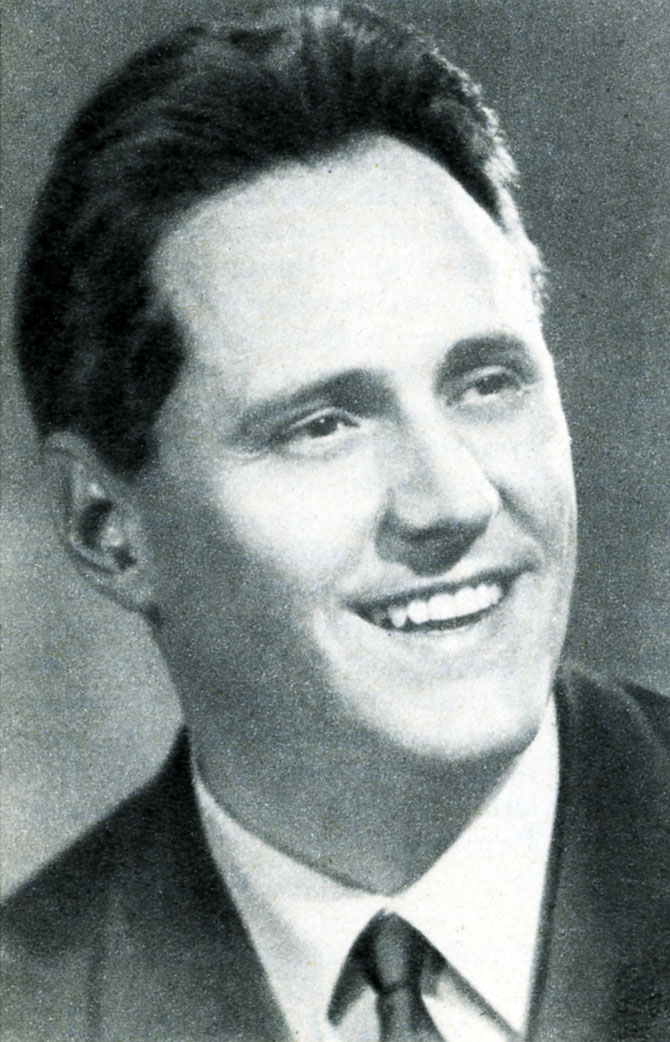
Sesto Bruscantini

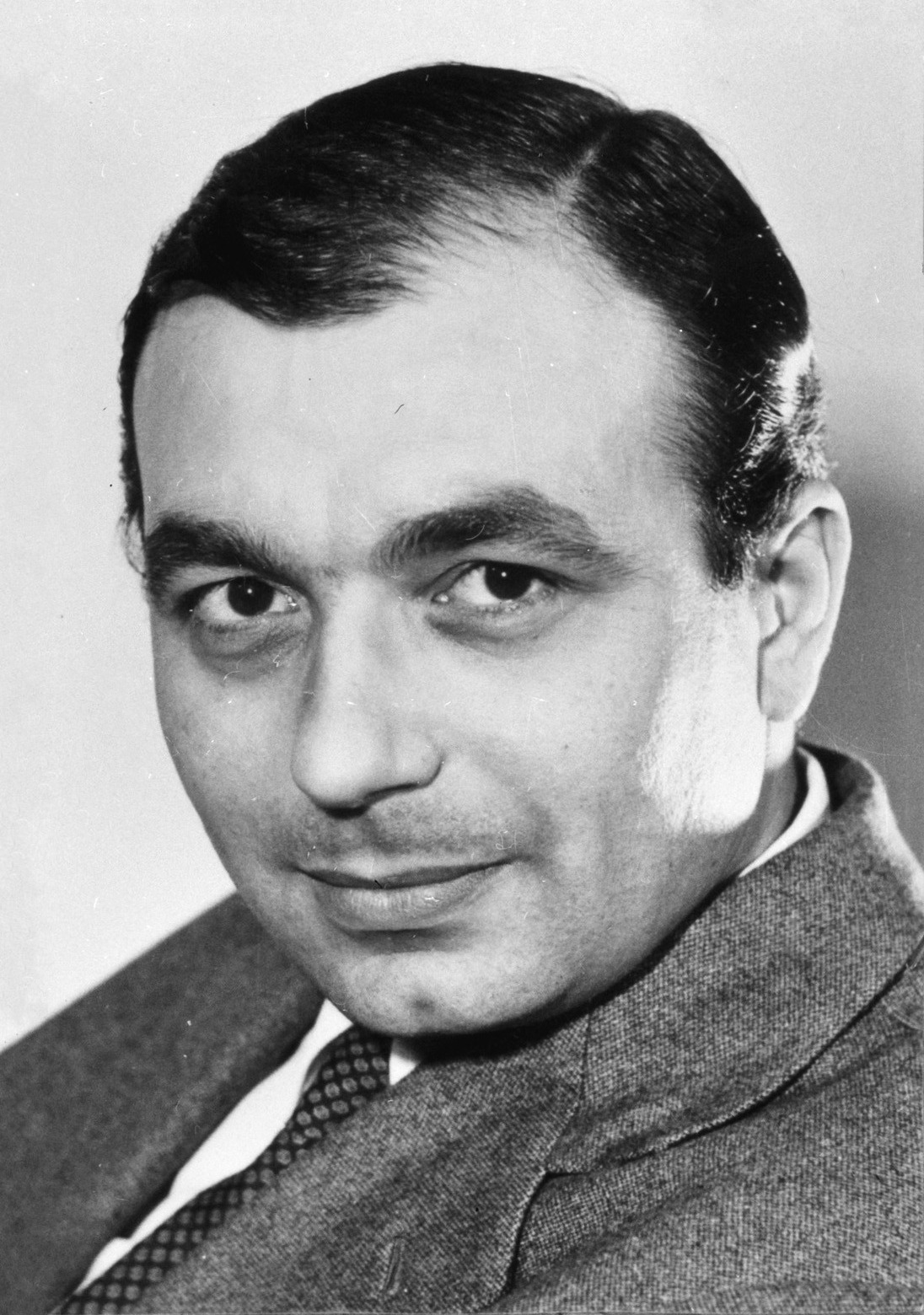
Renato Bruson

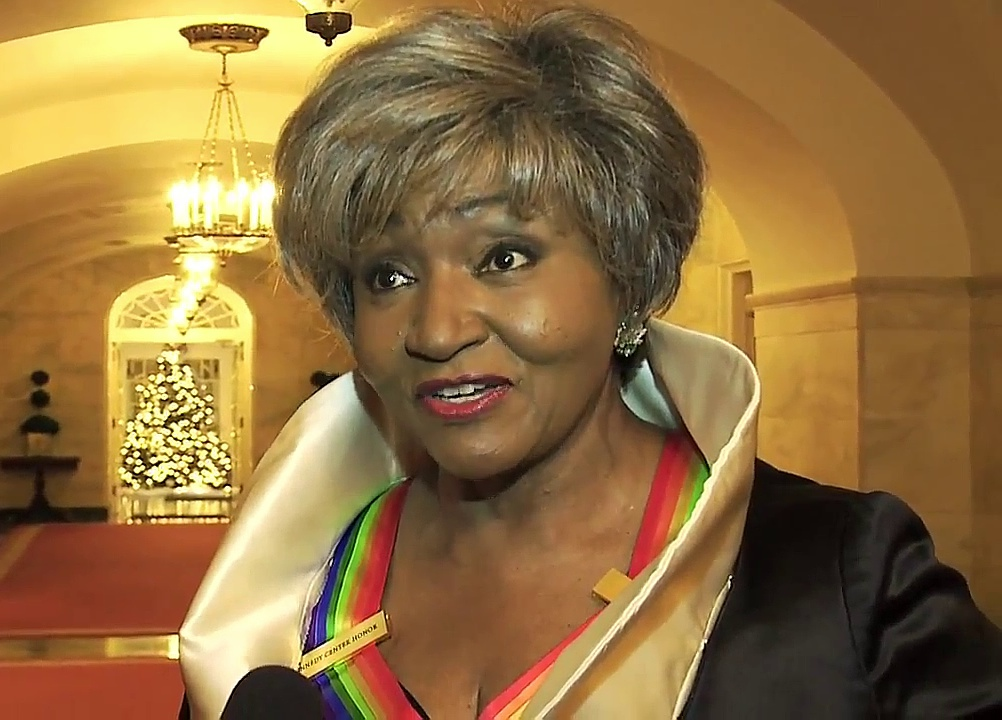
Grace Bumbry

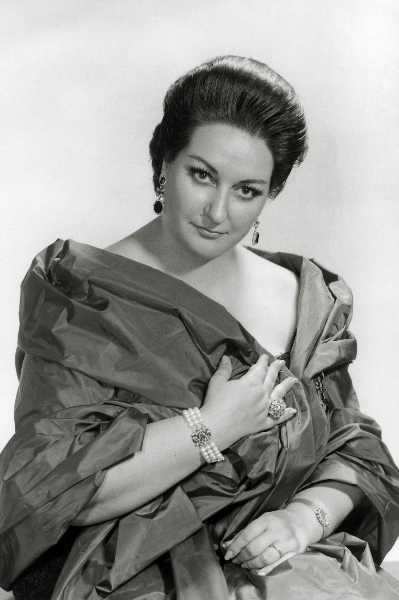
Montserrat Caballé

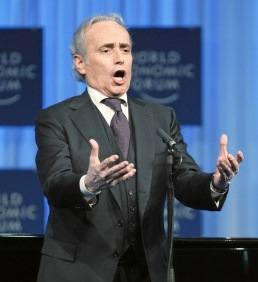
José Carreras

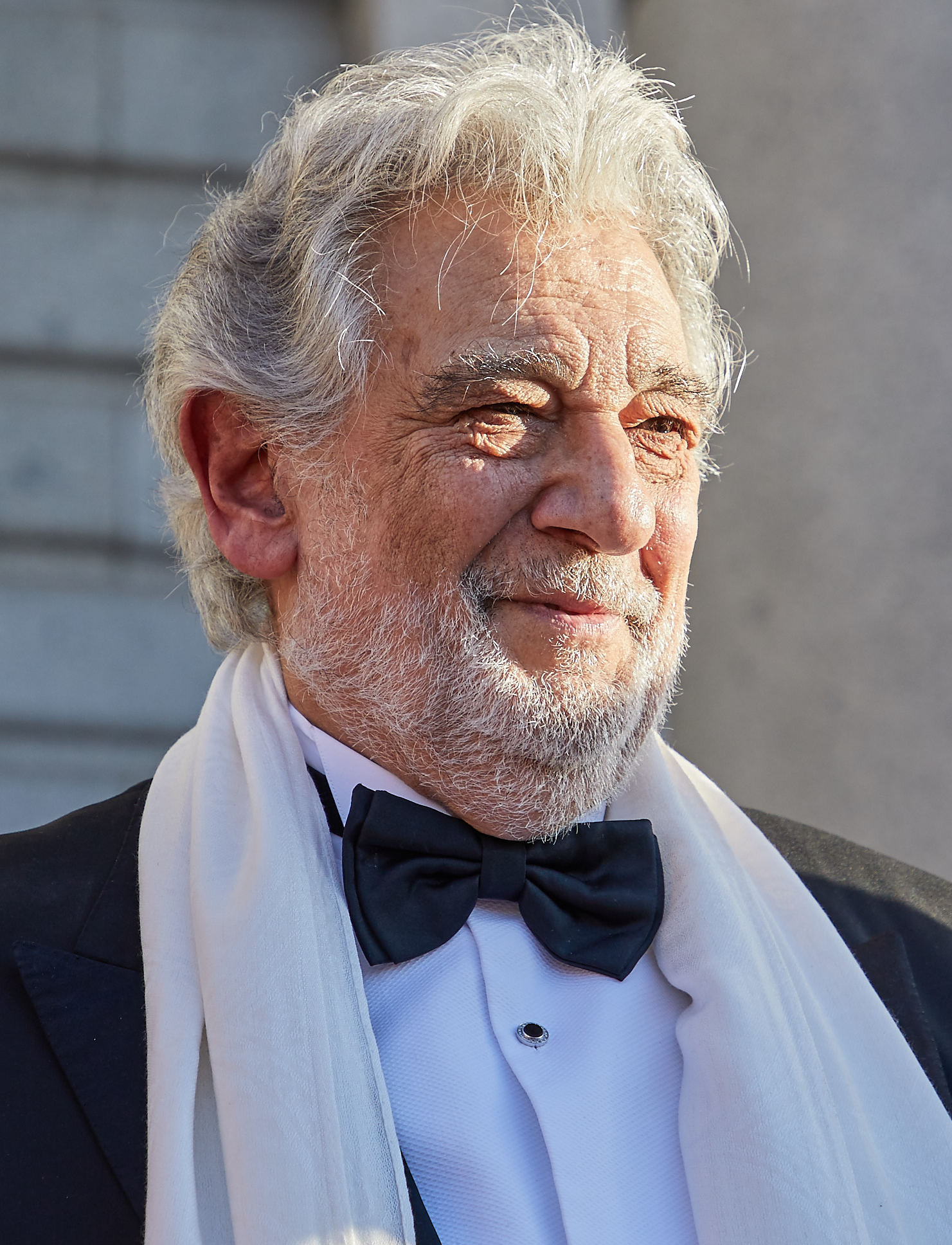
Plácido Domingo

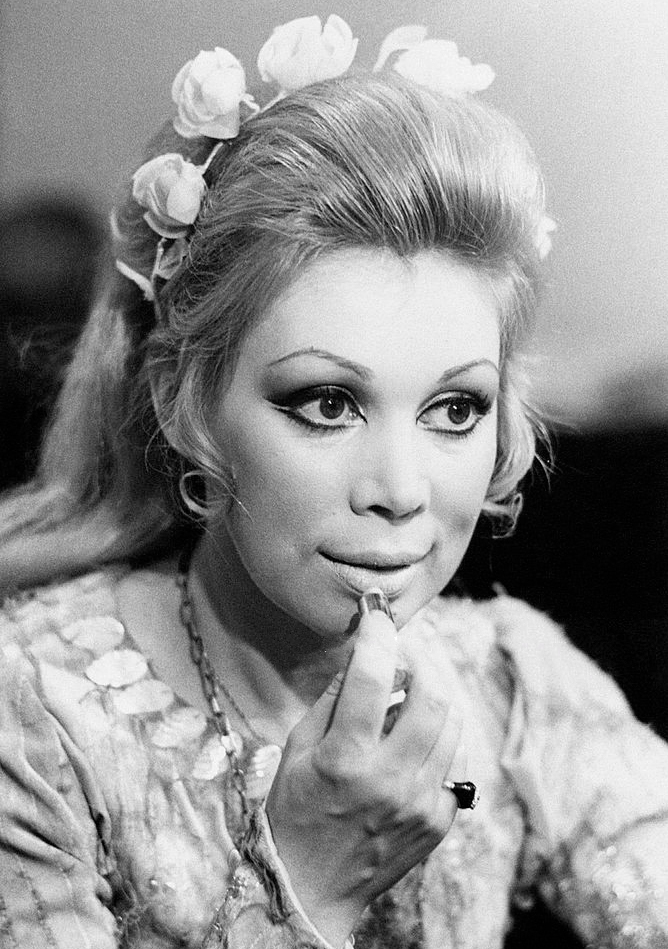
Mirella Freni

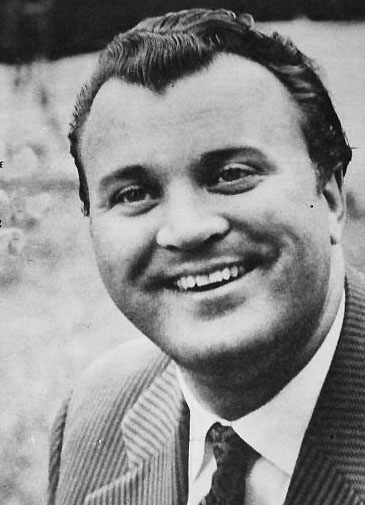
Nicolai Gedda

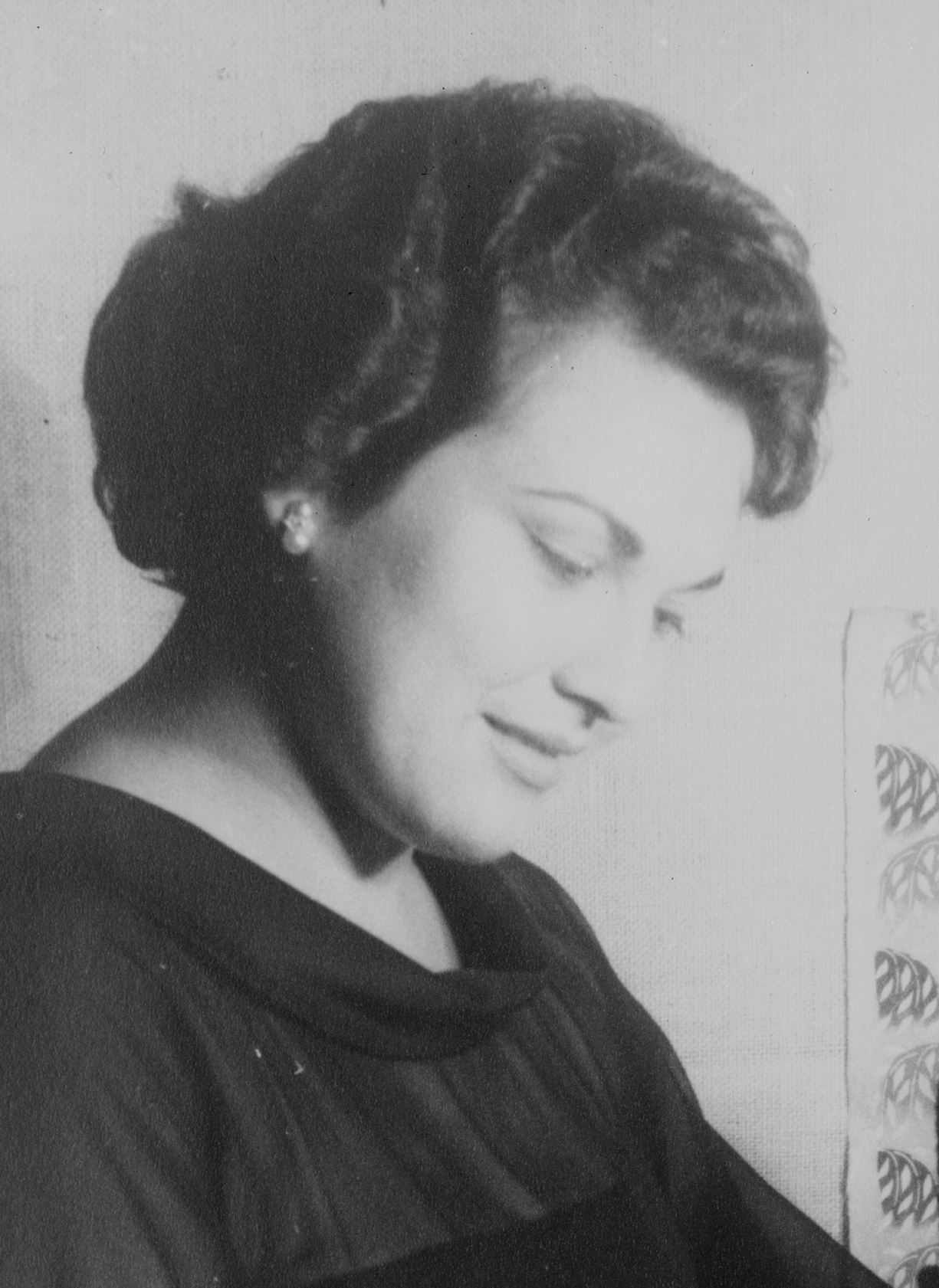
Marilyn Horne

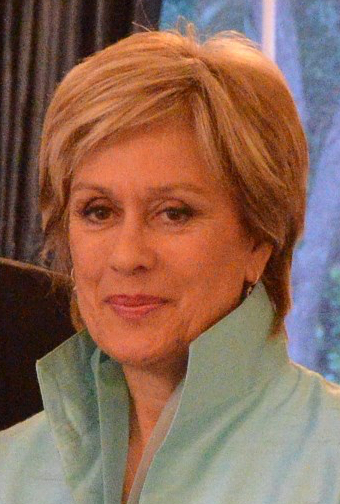
Kiri Te Kanawa

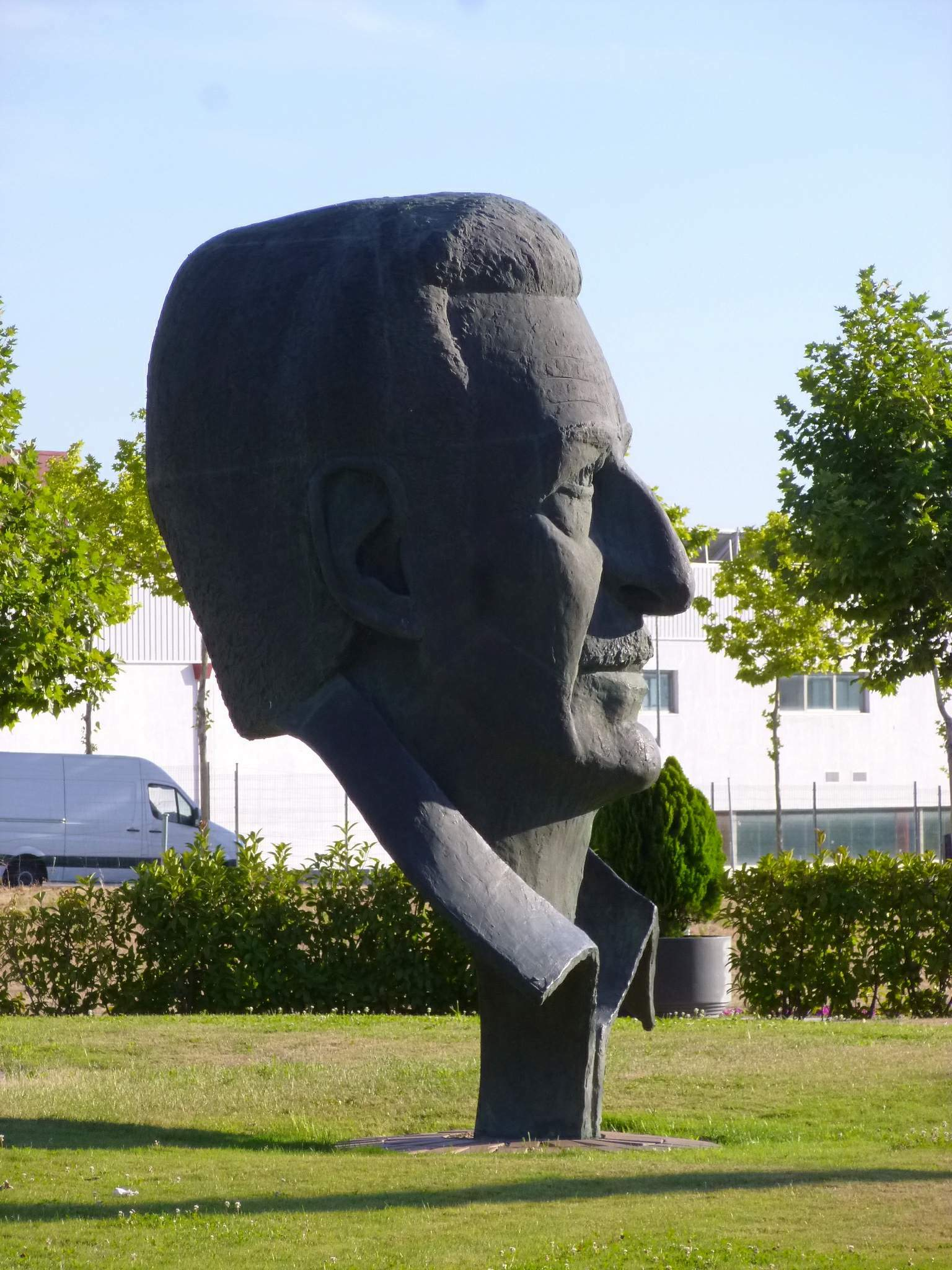
Alfredo Kraus

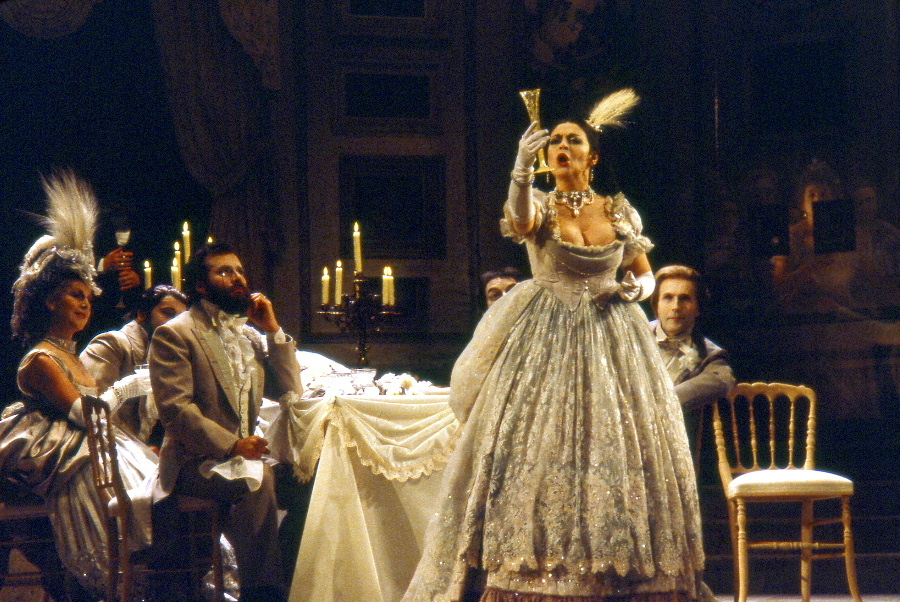
Catherine Malfitano

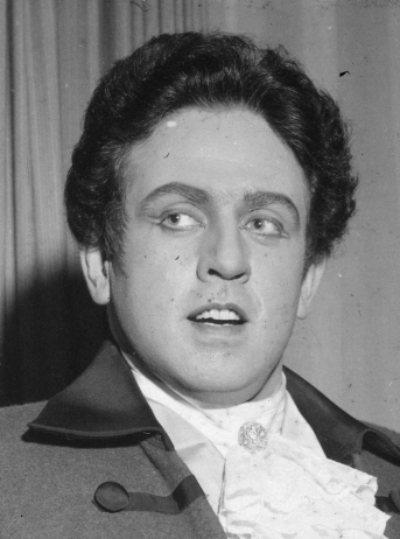
James McCracken

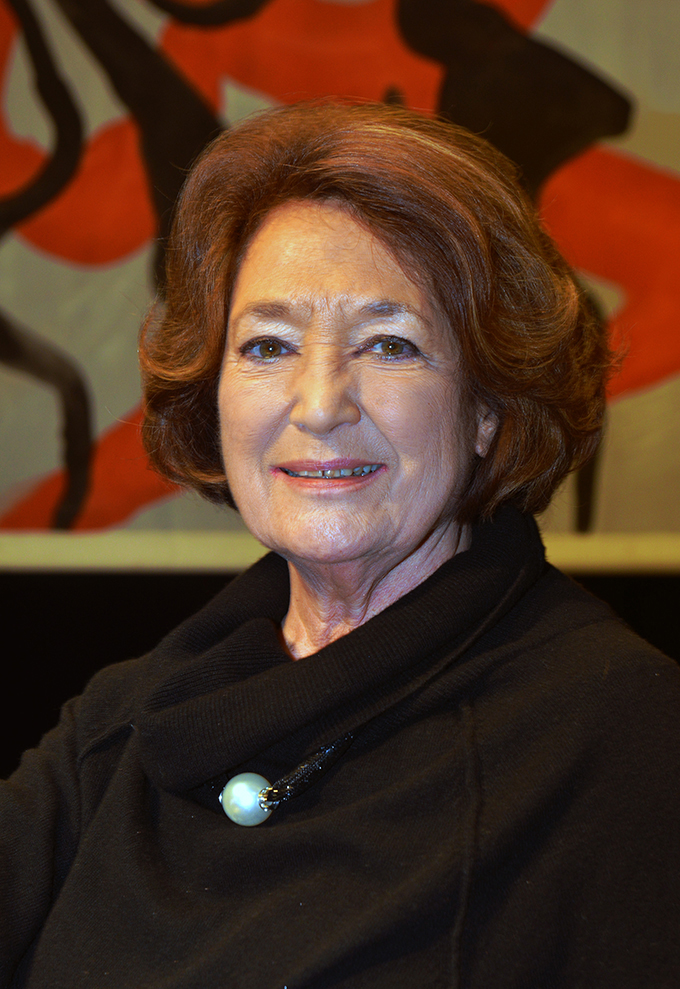
Edda Moser

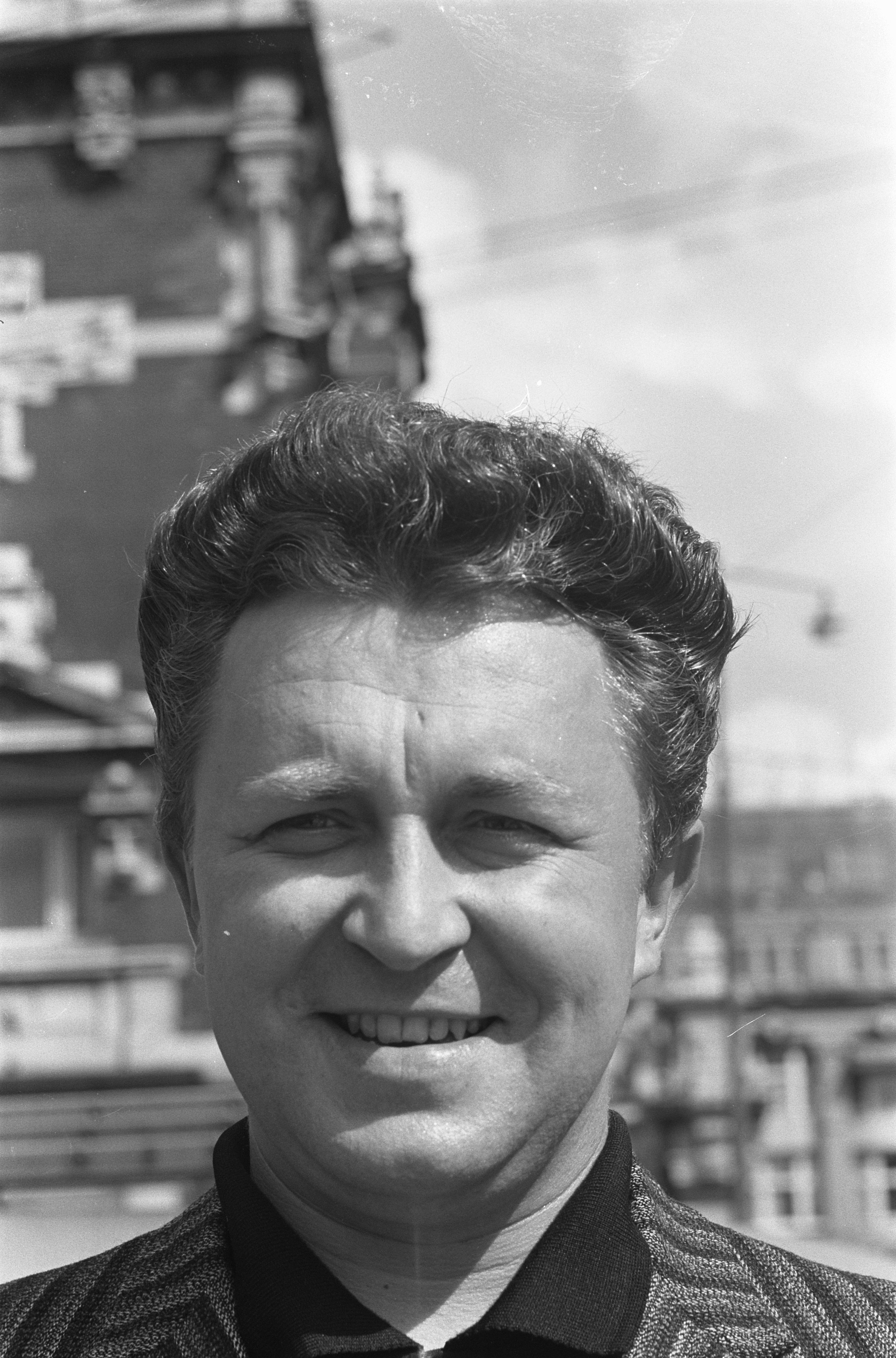
Robert Nagy

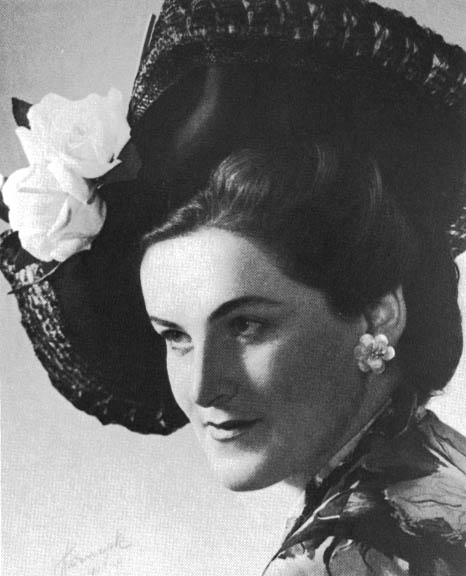
Birgit Nilsson

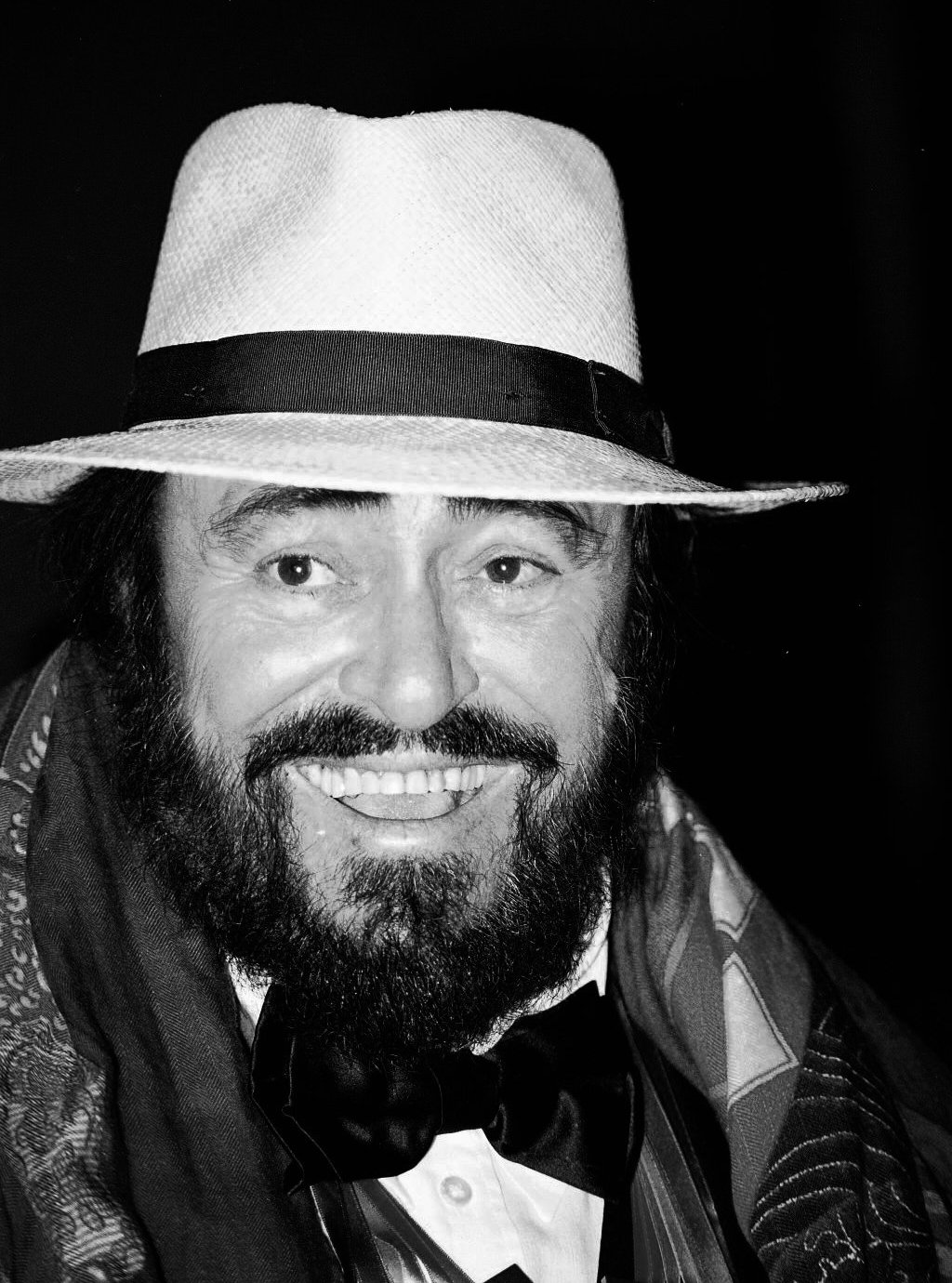
Luciano Pavarotti

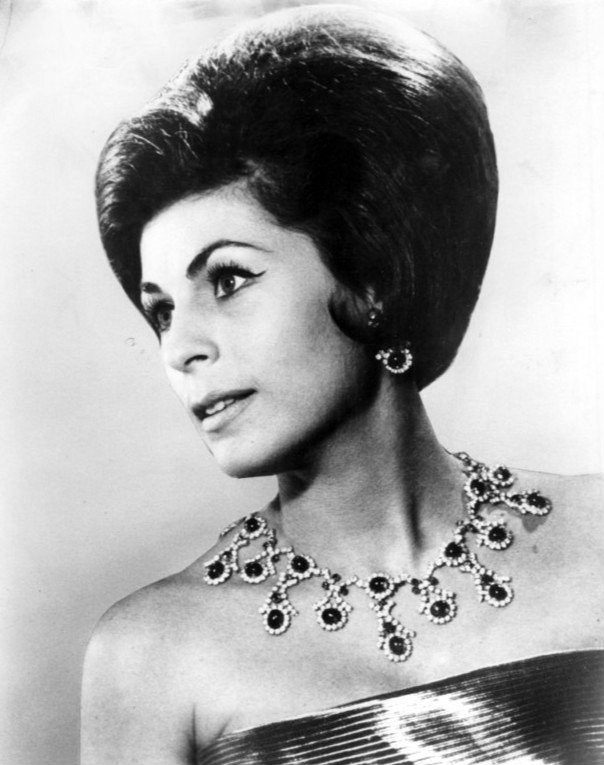
Roberta Peters

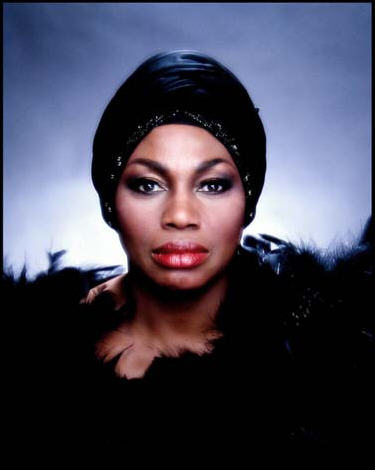
Leontyne Price

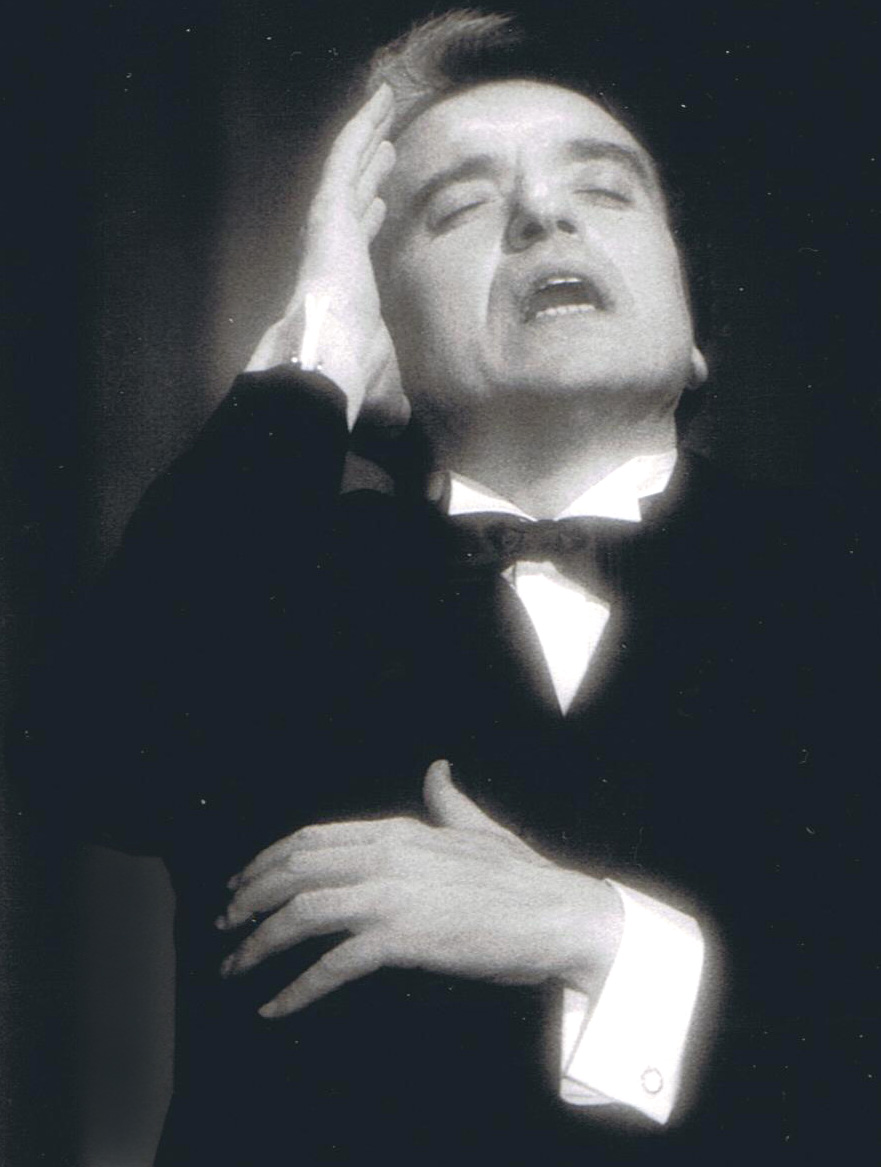
Ruggero Raimondi

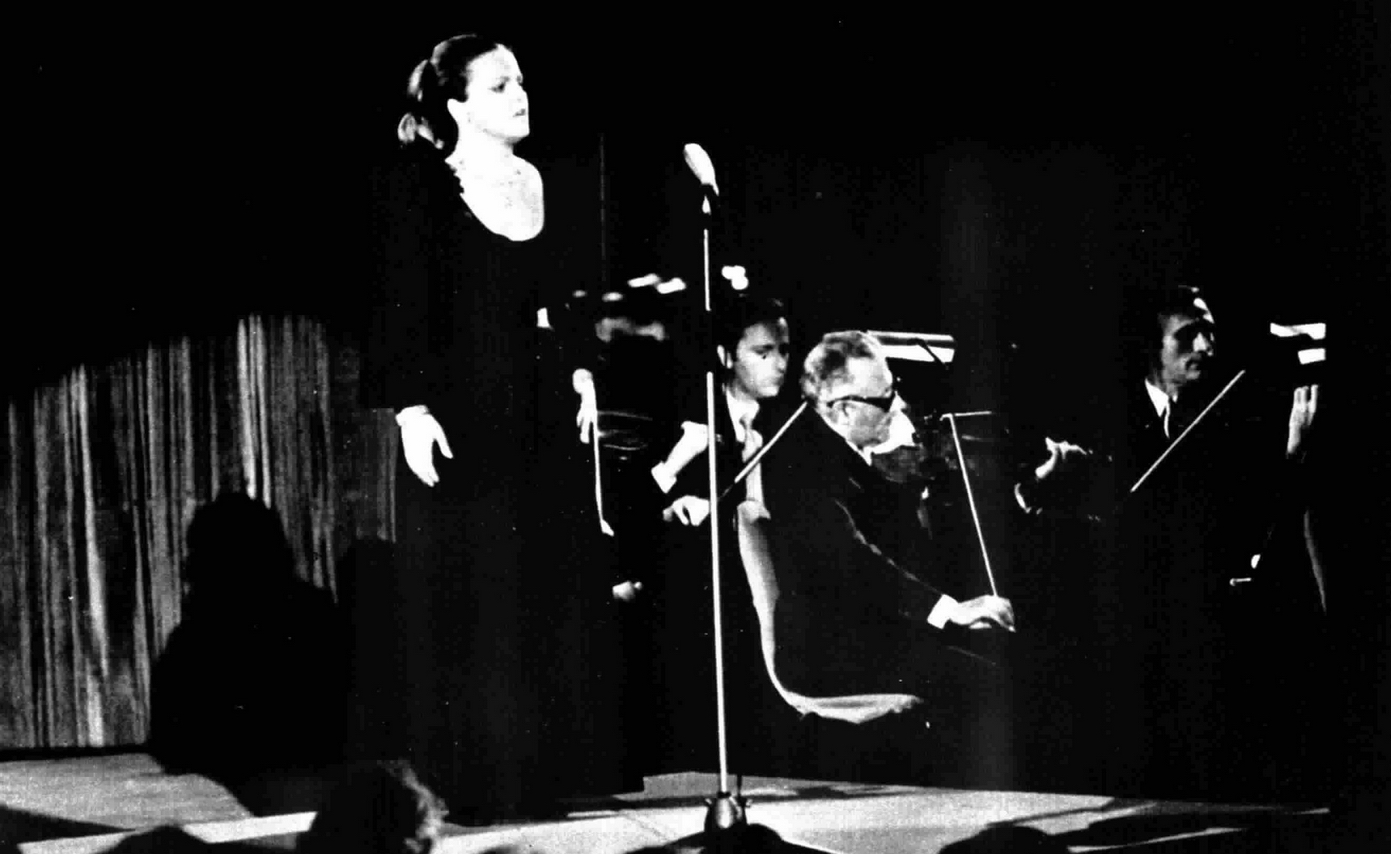
Katia Ricciarelli

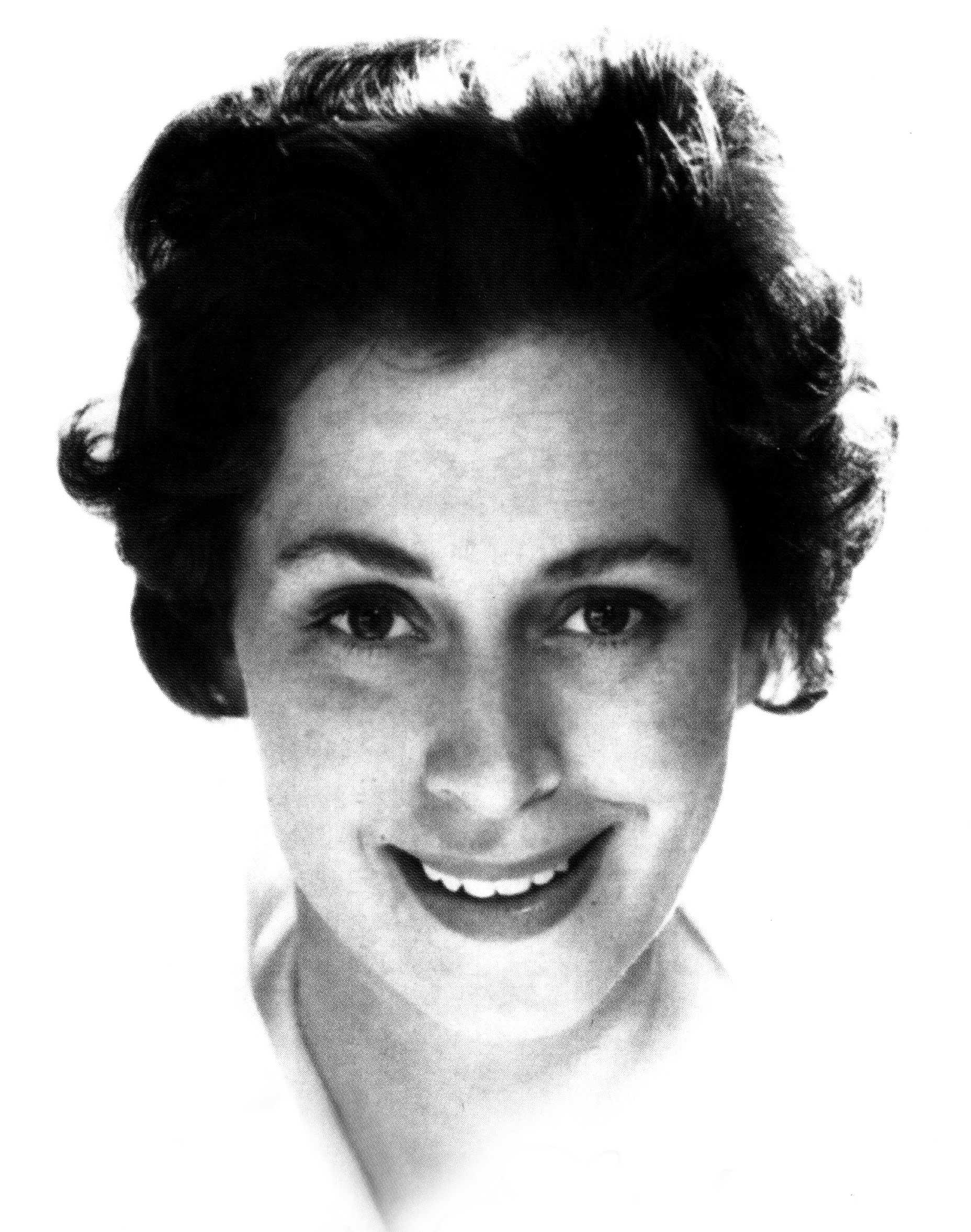
Elisabeth Söderström

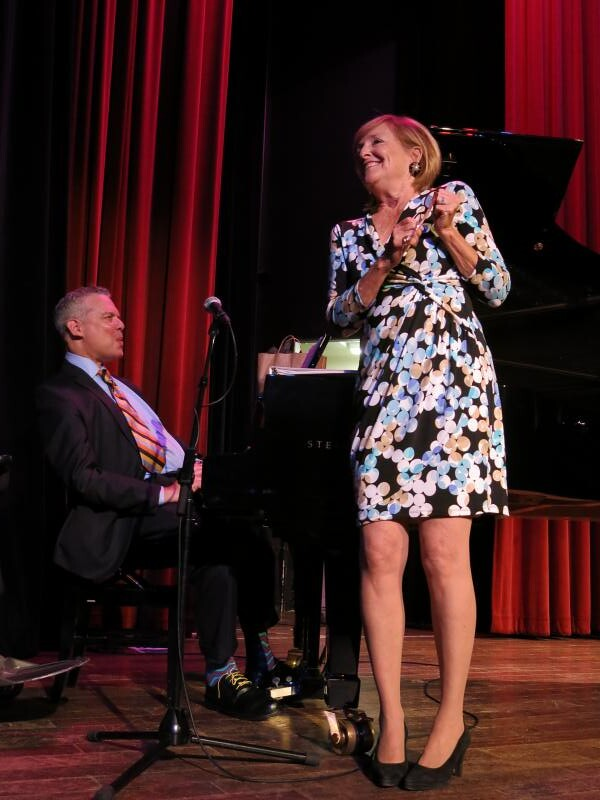
Frederica von Stade

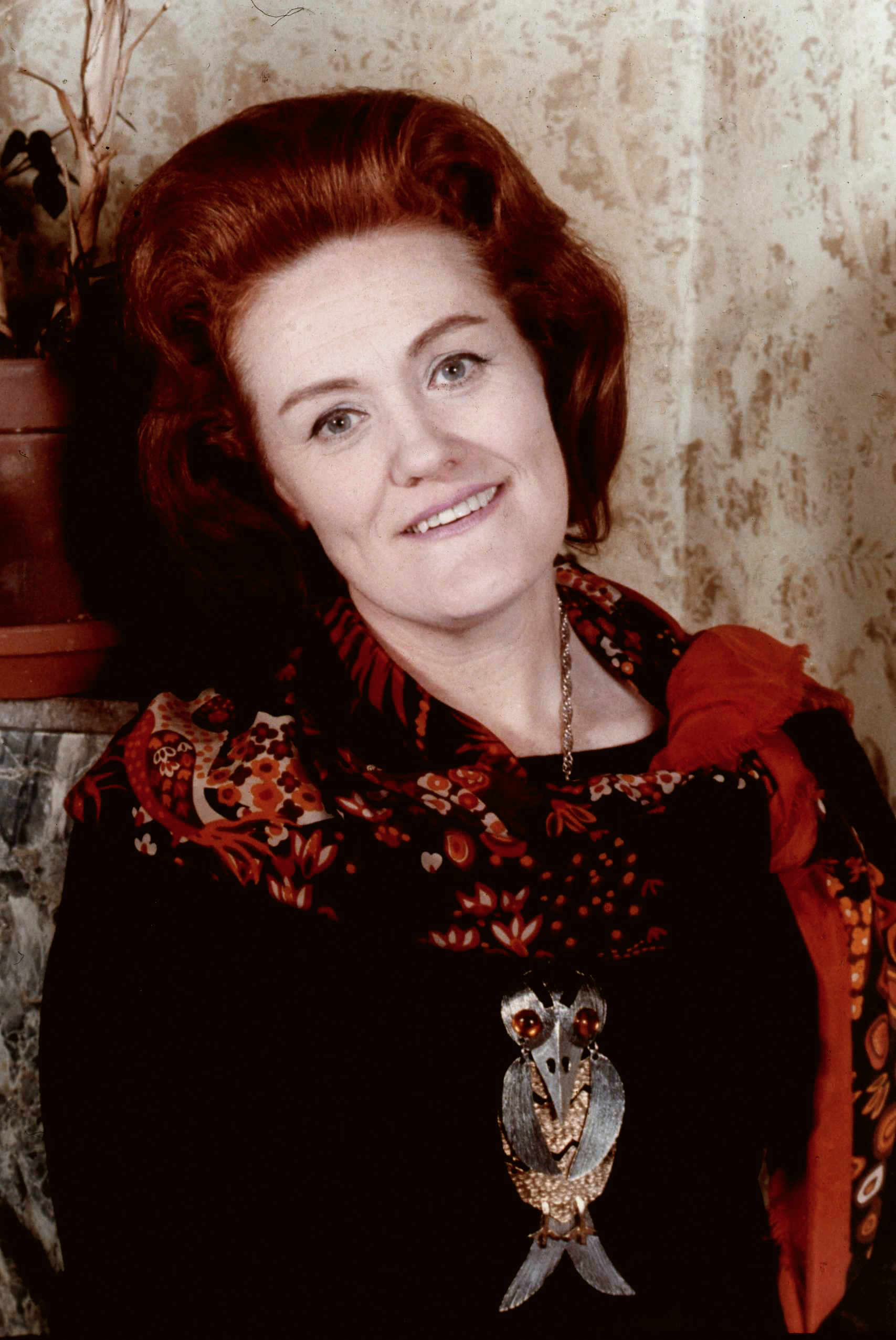
Joan Sutherland

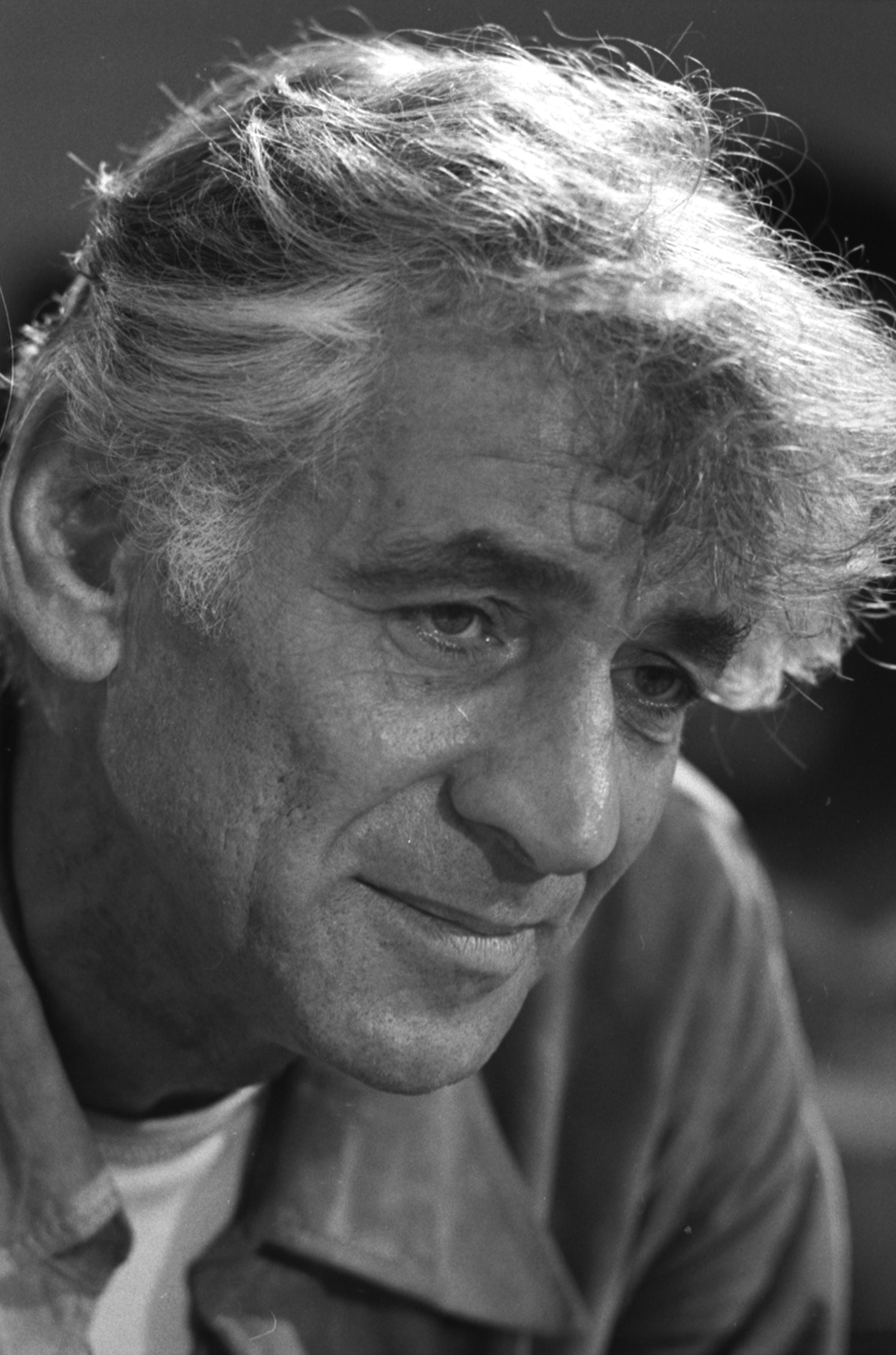
Leonard Bernstein

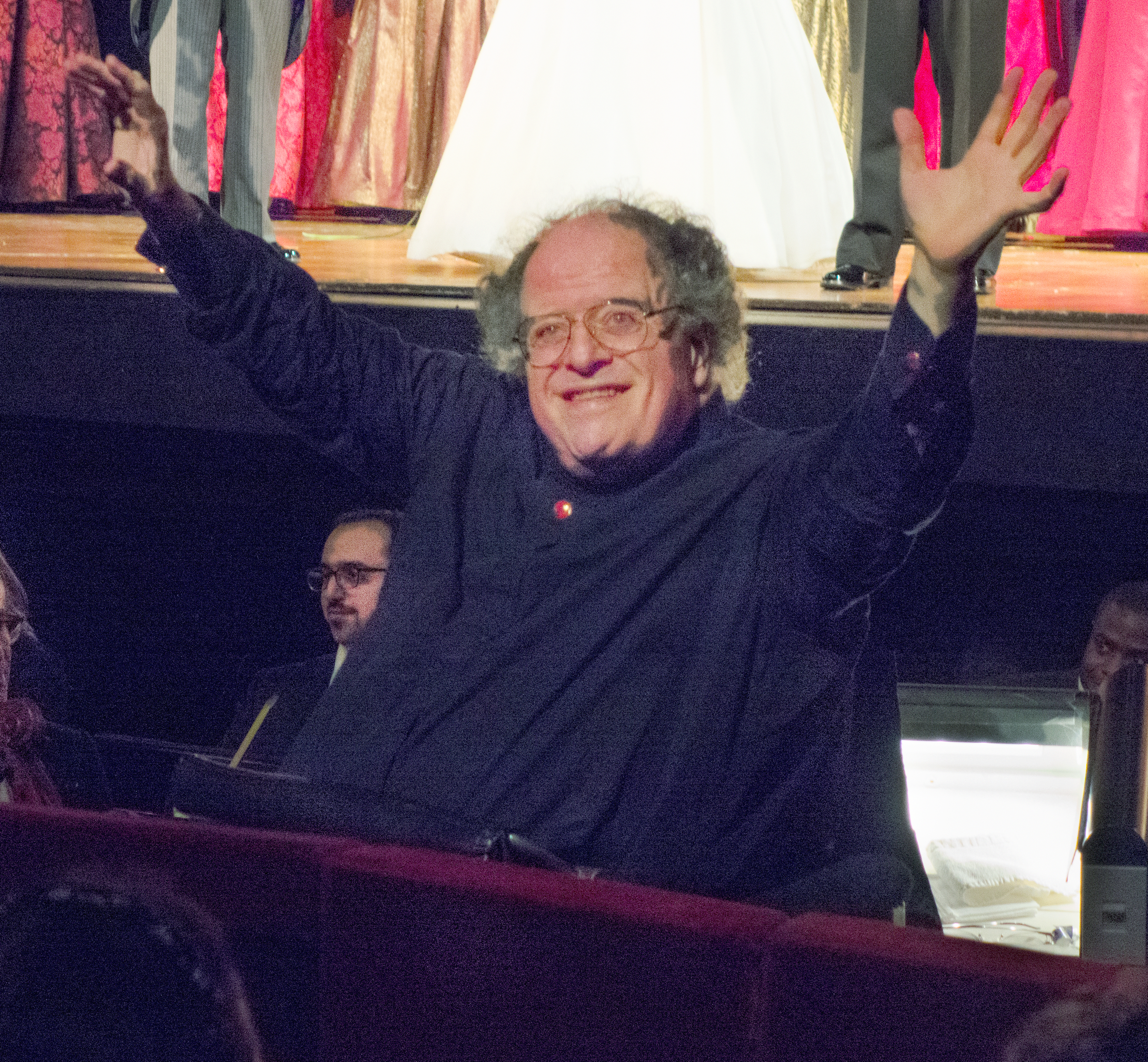
James Levine

== See also ==
- The Metropolitan Opera Gala 1991
- James Levine's 25th Anniversary Metropolitan Opera Gala
