= Gail Dubinbaum =

American opera singer (born 1957)

Gail Dubinbaum (born 1957) is an American operatic coloratura mezzo-soprano and co-founder and Creative Director of the Phoenix Metropolitan Opera.

== Career ==
A native of Long Island, New York, Dubinbaum first studied with her mother, Ruth Dubinbaum, and then with operatic mezzo-soprano Herta Glaz. She also had a close association with Elisabeth Schwarzkopf.

As befits a background so balanced between operatic and concert singing, Dubinbaum has been equally at home on the opera stage and concert platform since winning the Western Region Metropolitan Opera National Auditions in 1981. Her operatic career, with a focus on works by Rossini and Mozart, has included appearances in productions at various major houses across the United States, ranging from the Metropolitan and Boston Lyric opera companies on the East Coast to the Portland Opera on the West, with appearances in Texas, Michigan, and Arizona in between. Internationally, she has sung with major companies in Israel, Austria, and Canada. Her concert appearances have ranged equally widely: in addition to performances at several US music festivals, she has performed with the Boston Symphony Orchestra and New York Philharmonic, the San Francisco Symphony Orchestra and Los Angeles Philharmonic, the Cleveland Orchestra, and the Israel Philharmonic. Conductors with whom she has worked include the likes of Kurt Masur, Michael Tilson Thomas, Carlo Maria Giulini, and Leonard Bernstein; James Levine presided over her appearances on television in the popular series In Performance at the White House and Live from the Met and in the Met Centennial Gala. In 2007, Dubinbaum and her husband, conductor John Massaro, founded the Phoenix Metropolitan Opera, of which she is Creative Director. The company began with a single production of Puccini's La Boheme but planned to expand to two productions for the 2008–2009 season. The company also planned educational programs for children and young singers. Besides her involvement with the Phoenix company, Dubinbaum maintains a private studio at which she teaches voice in Phoenix.

== Videography ==
- The Metropolitan Opera Centennial Gala, Deutsche Grammophon DVD, 00440–073–4538, 2009
