= Herta Glaz =

American opera singer

Herta Glaz (also spelled Hertha; September 16, 1910 in Vienna – January 28, 2006 in Hamden, Connecticut) was an Austrian-born American operatic mezzo-soprano, voice teacher, and opera director of Austrian birth. She became a United States citizen in 1943. From 1942 to 1956, she was a fixture at the Metropolitan Opera, where she sang in more than 300 performances. She was also highly active with the San Francisco Opera between 1944 and 1951. Some of the roles she portrayed on stage were Marcellina in Le Nozze di Figaro, Annina, Siegrune in Die Walküre, Flosshilde in Götterdämmerung and Magdalene in Die Meistersinger von Nürnberg.

In her later years, Glaz became a celebrated voice teacher and opera director. She taught voice at the Manhattan School of Music from 1956 to 1977, University of Southern California from 1977 to 1994, the Aspen Music Festival between 1987 and 1994, and privately from her homes in New Haven and Los Angeles. Her notable pupils included sopranos Susan Davenny Wyner and Sally Sanford, and mezzos Gail Dubinbaum, Jacalyn Kreitzer, and Cynthia Munzer. In 1963 she founded the New Haven Opera Society which later became the New Haven Opera Theater (NHOT). She served as NHOT's director until the company disestablished due to financial reasons in 1976. With the company she presented 12 seasons of fully staged opera productions, as well as a highly active schedule of opera performances for school children.

Glaz was trained at the University of Music and Performing Arts, Vienna and the Mozarteum University of Salzburg. She married several times during her life: first to conductor Joseph Rosenstock and then to Viennese composer Paul August Csonka. Her third and last marriage was to Viennese psychiatrist Frederick Redlich which lasted nearly fifty years. Redlich was notably the Dean of the Yale University School of Medicine.
