= Ara Berberian =

American opera singer

- Born: Ara Berberian; 14 May 1930; Detroit, Michigan, US
- Died: 21 February 2005 (aged 74); Boynton Beach, Florida, US
- Occupations: Actor, Opera Singer

Ara Berberian (Armenian: Արա Բերբերյան, May 14, 1930 – February 21, 2005) was an American bass and actor who had an active international career in operas, concerts, and musicals from the early 1960s until his retirement from the stage in 1997. He notably had an 18-year association with the Metropolitan Opera in New York City, where he gave a total of 334 performances between 1979 and 1997. He sang over 100 roles during his career, including those of Osmin in Mozart's Abduction from the Seraglio and Sparafucile in Verdi's Rigoletto.

== Biographic data ==
Berberian was born in Detroit, Michigan, on May 14, 1930, of Armenian parents. He died on February 21, 2005, in Boynton Beach, Florida.

== Early life and education ==
Born in Detroit, Berberian attended the Culver Military Academy, a college preparatory school in Culver, Indiana, from which he graduated in 1948. He then matriculated to the University of Michigan where he earned a bachelor's degree in economics and a J.D. in law. While there he also studied voice privately with Kenneth Westerman and performed in several operas, musicals, and choral ensembles at the university.

A star pitcher in baseball at Culver Military Academy, Berberian left law school after his first year in 1953 to pursue a career in baseball. He played minor league baseball for one season with a team affiliated with the Kansas City Athletics, but an injury led him to return and complete law school. After practicing law for one year, he was drafted in the US Army in 1956 and successfully auditioned to join the United States Army Chorus. In 1958 he left the chorus to pursue a singing career in New York City. There he became a pupil of celebrated pedagogue Beverly Peck Johnson of the Juilliard School. Over the next few years he sang as a soloist with the Robert Shaw Chorale and the New York City Opera (NYCO).

== Career ==
Berberian made his debut in 1958 with the Turnau Opera in Woodstock, New York, as Don Magnifico in Rossini's La Cenerentola. In 1963 he was promoted from the chorus to singing roles with the NYCO, beginning with Leandro in The Love for Three Oranges in April of that year. He sang several more roles with NYCO through 1967, including Collatinus in The Rape of Lucretia, the Commandant in Don Giovanni, the Major-Domo in Capriccio, Osmin in Mozart's Abduction from the Seraglio, and Tiresias in Oedipus rex among others. He later returned to the NYCO in 1977 to create the role of Gene Henderson in the world premiere in Leon Kirchner's Lily.

From 1965 to 1968 Berberian was committed to the San Francisco Opera, making his debut with the company in the title role of Béla Bartók's Bluebeard's Castle with Beverly Wolff as Judith and Gerhard Samuel conducting on May 25, 1965. Other roles he sang with the company included Alvise Badoero in La Gioconda, Biterolf in Wagner's Tannhäuser, The Bonze in Madama Butterfly, both Charles V and the Friar in Don Carlos, Ferrando in Il trovatore, Inspector in The Visitation, Narbal in Hector Berlioz's Les Troyens, Orest's tutor in Elektra, Pimen in Boris Godunov, A rag picker in Louise, Samuel in Un ballo in maschera, The Speaker in The Magic Flute, the Wise Man in Christophe Colomb, and Man in the United States premiere of Kurt Weill's Royal Palace.

In 1966 Berberian portrayed the role of the Traveller in Britten's Curlew River at the Caramoor International Music Festival. In 1977 he made his debut at the Santa Fe Opera as Arkel in Pelléas et Mélisande. He returned to Santa Fe the following year to portray the roles of Prince Gremin in Eugene Onegin and the First Nazarene in Salome. In 1988 he created the role of Peter in the world premiere of Jack Beeson's My Heart's in the Highlands. He also sang with the Baltimore Opera Company, Cincinnati Opera, the Florentine Opera, the Houston Grand Opera, Michigan Opera Theatre, New Orleans Opera, Pittsburgh Opera, and the San Antonio Grand Opera Festival among others.

Berberian made his Metropolitan Opera debut on April 21, 1979, as Kecal in The Bartered Bride in an out of town performance in Cleveland, Ohio. He made his first appearance at the Metropolitan Opera House (Lincoln Center) as Zacharie in Giacomo Meyerbeer's Le prophète on September 25, 1979. He sang at the Met for 18 consecutive seasons, portraying more than 100 roles. Some of his more notable roles at the Met included Bouillon in Adriana Lecouvreur, Bonze in The Nightingale, Don Basilio in The Barber of Seville, Geronte in Manon Lescaut, Hermann in Tannhäuser, Mustafà in L'italiana in Algeri, the Old Hebrew in Samson and Dalila, Osmin in Die Entführung aus dem Serail, Rocco in Fidelio, Sparafucile in Verdi's Rigoletto, Spinelloccio in Gianni Schicchi, Titurel in Parsifal, and Zacharie in Le prophète among many others. In 1991 he created the role of the Turkish Ambassador in the world premiere of John Corigliano's The Ghosts of Versailles. His last performance at the Met was as Benoit/Alcindoro in Puccini's La boheme on January 23, 1997.

Berbarian's talents were not limited to the operatic stage, however. He also earned high critical acclaim in the realm of network television. In 1971 he collaborated with Alfredo Antonini in the role of Uriah in the premiere performance of Ezra Laderman's opera And David Wept for CBS Television. Nearly a decade earlier in 1964, he also collaborated with Antonini in CBS's televised adaptation of Hector Berlioz's sacred oratorio L'enfance du Christ in the role of Father.

Berberian was of Armenian ancestry and, in addition to his operatic repertoire, also sang and recorded music by Armenian and Armenian-American composers such as Komitas and Alan Hovhaness; he recorded three LP albums of the latter composer's songs. He also opened Game 3 of the 1984 World Series singing "The Star-Spangled Banner".

Berberian had a keen interest in preserving old barns and was an active environmentalist. Through a major donation of wooded land to the City of Southfield through the Oakland Land Conservancy, the Berberian Woods Nature Preserve was established in his honor.

== Videography ==
The Metropolitan Opera Centennial Gala, Deutsche Grammophon DVD, 00440–073–4538, 2009
