= Giuliano Ciannella =

Italian opera singer

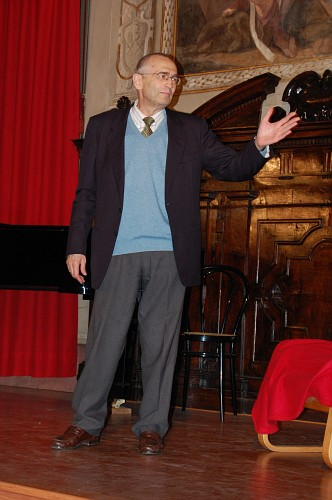
Giuliano Ciannella, April 2007

Giuliano Ciannella (25 October 1943 – 10 January 2008) was an Italian operatic tenor who had a major international career from the mid-1970s through the late 1990s. He was notably a regular performer at the Metropolitan Opera in New York City from 1979 through 1986, the Lyric Opera of Chicago between 1982 and 1988, and at the Vienna State Opera from 1985 up until the end of his career. Ciannella mostly performed roles from the Italian repertory, particularly excelling in the operas of Giuseppe Verdi and Giacomo Puccini.

== Biography ==
Born in Campi Salentina (Lecce). His father was a teacher and university dean. His mother a housewife. He has a younger brother Sergio and two nieces Elena and Eva.

Ciannella initially studied engineering at the University of Bologna until a chance encounter with Mirella Freni led him to his being encouraged towards an opera career. He entered the Bologna Conservatory where he studied under Leone Magiera. After he graduated he continued with further training under Carlo Bergonzi before making his professional opera debut in 1974 at the Teatro Nuovo in Milan as Edgardo in Gaetano Donizetti's Lucia di Lammermoor. That same year he won the Bussetto international singing competition. He made his first appearance at La Scala in 1976 as Cassio in Verdi's Otello. Over the next three years he had several successes at important opera houses in Italy, including the Teatro Carlo Felice, the Teatro Regio di Parma, and La Fenice.

Ciannella joined the roster of principal tenors at the Metropolitan Opera in 1979, making his first appearance with the company as Alfredo in Verdi's La traviata opposite Eugenia Moldoveanu as Violetta in an outdoor concert at Clove Lakes Park, Staten Island on June 13, 1979. His first performance at the actual opera house was on September 24, 1979 as Cassio to Plácido Domingo's Otello and Gilda Cruz-Romo's Desdemona; a performance which was broadcast live on television. Cianella made more than one hundred appearances at the Met over the next nine seasons, with his signature roles at the house being Alfredo, Rodolfo in Puccini's La Bohème and the title role in Verdi's Don Carlo. His other roles with the company included Des Grieux in Puccini's Manon Lescaut, the Italian Singer in Richard Strauss's Der Rosenkavalier, Macduff in Verdi's Macbeth, Manrico in Verdi's Il trovatore, Pinkerton in Puccini's Madama Butterfly, and Rinuccio in Puccini's Gianni Schicchi. He also gave several performances of Verdi's Requiem with the company alongside fellow soloists Johanna Meier, James Morris, and Florence Quivar in 1981. After leaving the Met in 1986, Ciannella returned to the house only one more time during his career for a 1996 production of Puccini's Turandot. His final and 112th performance at the Met was as Prince Calàf to Ruth Falcon's Turandot on June 14, 1996.

Ciannella was also a regular performer with the Lyric Opera of Chicago during the 1980s. He made his debut with the company as Pinkerton on November 17, 1982 with Elena Mauti Nunziata as Cio–Cio–San, Elena Zilio as Suzuki, and Sesto Bruscantini as Sharpless. His other roles in Chicago included Enzo Grimaldo in La Gioconda, Manrico, and Rodolfo among others. His last performance with the company was as Mario Cavaradossi in Tosca opposite Renata Scotto in the title role on February 5, 1988.

Ciannella also performed roles with many other companies internationally during the 1980s and 1990s. He sang frequently at the Vienna State Opera from 1985 up until the end of his career, performing much of the same repertoire he performed at the Met. He notably gave a lauded portrayal of Riccardo in Verdi's Un ballo in maschera in 1990. Ciannella made his debut at the San Francisco Opera in 1984 as Don José in Carmen. He appeared at the Houston Grand Opera for the first time in 1985 in the title role of Charles Gounod's Faust, and that same year made his debut at the Bavarian State Opera in the title role of Verdi's Don Carlo. In 1986 he performed for the first time at the Royal Opera at Covent Garden as Manrico. He appeared in operas at the Arena di Verona during the summers of 1983, 1985, 1986 and 1988. In 1987 he sang the title role in Verdi's Ernani at the Bregenzer Festspiele. He sang two roles at the Oper der Stadt Köln during his career, Don José (1988) and Des Grieux (1990). His other performances include appearances with the Deutsche Oper Berlin and the Grand Théâtre de Genève among many others.

After retiring from the stage in the late 1990s, Ciannella taught on the voice faculties of the Parma Conservatory and the Ferrara Conservatory. He was still teaching at the time of his death in Ferrara in 2008.

== Videography ==
- The Metropolitan Opera Centennial Gala, Deutsche Grammophon DVD, 00440-073-4538, 2009
