= Thomas Fulton =

American conductor

Thomas Fulton (September 18, 1949 - August 4, 1994), was an American conductor.

Noted primarily for his work in opera, among other schools, Fulton studied conducting under Max Rudolf at Curtis Institute of Music and served as an assistant to him and to his successor, David Effron, coaching for the Opera Department, preparing productions and sometimes playing for the studio productions.

He debuted at the Metropolitan Opera in New York City in 1979 and remained with the company until his death. He conducted 192 performances at the Met of over 20 operas in the Italian, French and German repertoires. A 1982 performance he conducted of Humperdinck's Hansel and Gretel was telecast on PBS and remains available on video as a DVD.

Fulton was also associated with Orchestre National de France, and the Paris Opera among other companies in France and Germany. He was on staff as a conductor with the Ravinia Festival, the Opera Company of Boston, and the San Francisco Opera.

According to his obituary, Fulton died from kidney failure while vacationing in Milan. He was 44 years old.

== Videography ==
- The Metropolitan Opera Centennial Gala (1983), Deutsche Grammophon DVD, 00440-073-4538
