= James McCracken =

American dramatic tenor

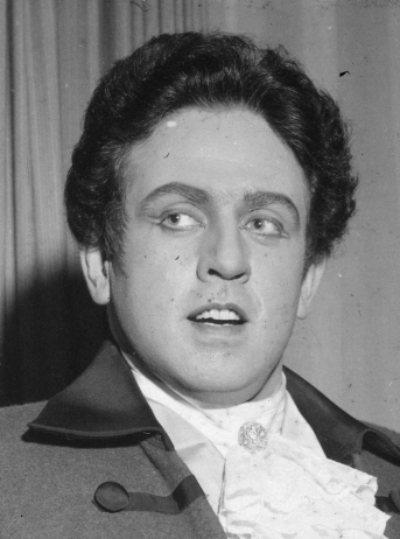
- James McCracken as Cavaradossi in Tosca at the Vienna State Opera in the 1960s
- Born: December 16, 1926; Gary, Indiana
- Died: April 29, 1988 (aged 61); Manhattan, New York
- Education: Columbia University
- Occupation: Opera singer
- Spouse: Sandra Warfield

James McCracken (December 16, 1926 – April 29, 1988) was an American operatic tenor. At the time of his death The New York Times stated that McCracken was "the most successful dramatic tenor yet produced by the United States and a pillar of the Metropolitan Opera during the 1960s and 1970s."

== Biography ==
Born in Gary, Indiana, McCracken's earliest musical experiences were singing in his church choir in childhood. In the US Navy during World War II, he sang in the Blue Jacket Choir. He studied music at Columbia University, with Elsa Seyfert in Konstanz, Germany, and then with Joyce McLean in New York City until his death.

McCracken made his professional opera debut in 1952 with the Central City Opera in Colorado as Rodolfo in Puccini's La bohème. He sang minor roles at the Metropolitan Opera from 1953 to 1957, while still a student. In 1957, he moved to Europe and made his debut at the Vienna State Opera. He had great success with the Zürich Opera.

The role of Otello in Verdi's opera, Otello, was one of his signature roles. Starting in 1963, he became one of the Met's principal dramatic tenors. He replaced an injured Mario del Monaco at The Royal Opera House in London on very short notice on 11 April 1964, which won critical acclaim, including by Philip Hope-Wallace of The Guardian who described it as: "[T]he audience know at once that this was the voice for the part: large, inclined to perhaps splay a little, but sonorous, the emanation of the true Otello..." James McCracken also starred in Otello and Carmen in 1972; in Aida directed by John Dexter in 1976; in Le prophete in 1977; and in Tannhauser in 1978, his only leading Wagnerian role.

Feeling slighted about being passed over for the September 1978 telecast of Otello which starred Jon Vickers, McCracken resigned from the Metropolitan Opera, only to return to a rousing ovation in October 1983 for the Centennial Gala, during which he performed Otello's Act 3 soliloquy, "Dio! mi potevi scagliar". The following season, he took part in a live telecast of Verdi's Aida on January 5, 1985, which was historic in that it was Leontyne Price's farewell to the operatic stage.

McCracken's voice was huge, with a distinctive and somewhat thick texture. Occasionally he was criticized for his less-than-effortless singing technique. But virtually all critics acknowledged his acting skill, as well as the overwhelming power of his sound and his clarion high notes.

He was married to mezzo-soprano Sandra Warfield, with whom he performed Saint-Saëns' Samson and Delilah at the Met. He was a member of the Metropolitan Opera's final U.S. tour, where he sang the role of Canio in Pagliacci.

Following a series of stroke, McCracken died in Roosevelt Hospital, New York on April 29, 1988, aged 61.

== Recordings ==
McCracken made a number of complete opera recordings, including "Le prophète" (with Marilyn Horne and Renata Scotto, (Col/CBS), 1976), "Carmen" (conducted by Leonard Bernstein, (DG), 1972), "Fidelio" (with Birgit Nilsson, (Decca/London), 1964), "Otello" (with Dame Gwyneth Jones, (EMI/Angel), 1968) and "Pagliacci", on which side 4 of the original LP version was a recital of opera arias, (Decca/London), (1967), as well as Schoenberg's Gurre-Lieder (with Jessye Norman, Tatiana Troyanos and David Arnold, (Phi), 1979), and a program of Irish and Scottish songs with piano (EMI/Angel), 1977. Additionally, he sang the part of Waldemar in Gurre-Lieder when it opened the Edinburgh International Festival in 1961. The broadcast of this concert, under the direction of Leopold Stokowski, has now been issued on CD (Guild Historical).

== Videography ==
- The Metropolitan Opera Centennial Gala, Deutsche Grammophon DVD, 00440-073-4538, 2009

== Publications ==
- McCracken, James; Sandra Warfield; Robert Daley (ed.) (1970), A Star in the Family: the Warm and Vibrant Romance of the Internationally Celebrated Singing Couple, New York: Coward, McCann & Geoghegan. ISBN 1-199-45280-7
