= Phoenix Opera =

Opera company in Arizona

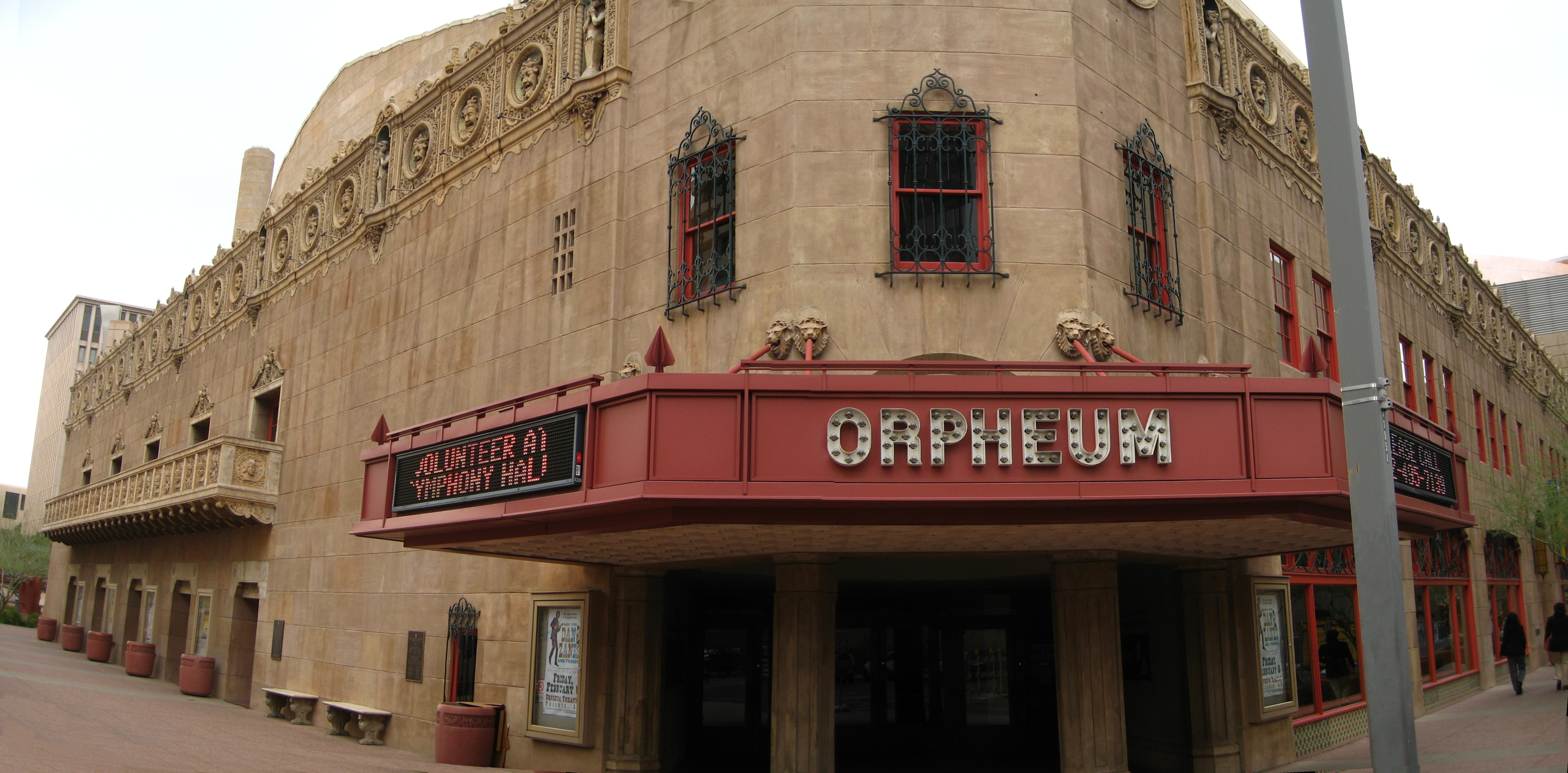
The Orpheum Theatre, Phoenix Opera's performance venue

The Phoenix Opera is a professional opera company located in Phoenix, Arizona, United States. The company was founded as the Phoenix Metropolitan Opera in 2006 by the artistic director John Massaro the creative director Gail Dubinbaum and business manager Howard Paley. Massaro and Dubinbaum are married and have both had highly successful musical careers, working with such prestigious companies as the Metropolitan Opera. The 2007 inaugural season included only one fully staged opera, Puccini's La Bohème. In 2008/09, the company presented two fully staged productions: Verdi's Aida and Puccini's Tosca. In the 2009/10 season the company presented Carmen and Madama Butterfly conducted by Massaro. In the 2010/11 season the company presented The Magic Flute and La Traviata.

The company performed all its productions at the Orpheum Theatre. Notable artists to have sung with the company include the soprano Marie Te Hapuku, Fabiana Bravo, Mauro Augustini and Donnie Ray Albert. Phoenix Opera also presented a special gala with Dmitri Hvorostovsky. Phoenix Opera's last performance, An Evening with Jonas Kaufmann, was in 2013 transitioning to focus on The Southwest Vocal Competition which has since concluded. Since 2020 the company continues to focus on education and community events throughout Metropolitan Phoenix.
