= Robert Nagy (tenor) =

American opera singer

Robert Nagy (March 3, 1929 – November 7, 2008) was an American operatic tenor who had a lengthy and fruitful association with the Metropolitan Opera that lasted for three decades. His association with the Met began when he won the Metropolitan Opera National Council Auditions in 1956. He mostly portrayed comprimario roles at the Met where his most memorable early role was the Messenger in Aida, a role he sang 172 times for the company. He notably sang in the world premieres of two operas by Samuel Barber at the Met: Vanessa (1958) and Antony and Cleopatra (1966). He also sang in the company premieres of Die Frau ohne Schatten (1966), Billy Budd (1978) and L'enfant et les sortilèges (1981). Although Nagy specialized in supporting roles, he also portrayed several leading parts at the Met, among them Florestan in Fidelio, Herodes in Salome, the Kaiser in Die Frau ohne Schatten and the Drum Major in Wozzeck. He remained on the Met roster through the end of the 1987–88 season, performing 1,187 performances with the Met during his thirty years with the company.

Nagy also appeared with the New York City Opera, from 1969 to 1976. His debut was as Luigi in Il tabarro, and possibly his most notable role there was Faust in the new production, directed by Tito Capobianco, of Mefistofele, starring Norman Treigle in the name part, in 1969. Nagy appeared with Renata Scotto in 1976 as Luigi in Il Tabarro as part of the soprano's legendary performances of all three heroines of Il Trittico.

== Abridged videography ==
- Strauss: Ariadne auf Naxos (Watson, Sills; Leinsdorf, 1969) [Concert Version] VAI
- Strauss: Elektra (Nilsson, McIntyre; Levine, Graf, 1980) DG
- The Metropolitan Opera Centennial Gala (1983) DG
