= Loretta Di Franco =

American operatic soprano (1942–2024)

- Di Franco in the 1980s
- Born: October 28, 1942; New York City, U.S.
- Died: December 30, 2024 (aged 82)
- Occupation: Operatic soprano
- Organizations: Metropolitan Opera

Loretta Di Franco (October 28, 1942 – December 30, 2024) was an American operatic soprano. She was known for her more than 900 performances at the Metropolitan Opera from 1961 to 1995.

== Biography ==
Di Franco was born in New York City on October 28, 1942. She first worked as a secretary and studied voice with Maud Webber and Walter Taussig. She became a member of the opera chorus of the Metropolitan Opera (Met) in New York City, and was eventually promoted to singing small comprimario roles, beginning with one of the pages in Wagner's Tannhäuser and the peasant girl in Mozart's The Marriage of Figaro in 1961. She went on to win the Metropolitan Opera National Council Auditions in 1965 which led to her engagement as a soloist. Her first substantial role was Chloe in Tchaikovsky's The Queen of Spades. She continued to appear annually at the Met for the next 30 years, performing both leading and supporting roles.

Her roles at the Met included:

- Annina (La traviata)
- The Aunt, Barena (Janáček's Jenůfa)
- Barbarina, Marcellina (The Marriage of Figaro)
- Berta (Rossini's The Barber of Seville)
- Countess Ceprano (Verdi's Rigoletto)
- The Dew Fairy, The Sandman (Humperdinck's Hansel and Gretel)
- Feklusa (Janáček's Káťa Kabanová)
- Papagena, The First Lady (The Magic Flute)
- The Flower Seller (Britten's Death in Venice)
- Frasquita (Carmen)
- Gerhilde (Die Walküre)
- Giannetta (L'elisir d'amore)
- Helen (Marvin David Levy's Mourning Becomes Electra)
- Ines (Il trovatore)
- Jouvenot (Cilea's Adriana Lecouvreur)
- Kate Pinkerton (Madama Butterfly)
- Laura (Verdi's Luisa Miller)
- Lauretta (Puccini's Gianni Schichi)
- Lisa (Bellini's La sonnambula)
- Poussette (Massenet's Manon)
- Marianne (Der Rosenkavalier)
- Marthe (Gounod's Faust)
- Musetta (Puccini's La bohème)
- Oscar (Un ballo in maschera)
- Samaritana (Zandonai's Francesca da Rimini)
- Woglinde (Das Rheingold, Götterdämmerung)
- Xenia (Mussorgsky's Boris Godunov)
- Zerlina (Mozart's Don Giovanni)
- Lucia (Lucia di Lammermoor)

In 1991, she created the role of the Woman with Child in the world premiere of John Corigliano's The Ghosts of Versailles. This was also the role in which she gave her final performance at the Metropolitan in April 1995. She appeared in 929 performances at and with the Met, placing her 36th on the list of the company's performers with the most appearances.

Di Franco also worked as a concert singer. She appeared as a guest, at major houses in the U.S. and at the 1975 Salzburg Festival as Hüterin der Schwelle in Die Frau ohne Schatten by R. Strauss.

After retiring from her singing career, she remained with the Met as a language coach, including English diction coach for a new production of Britten's Peter Grimes in the 2007/08 season and as Italian coach for many international guests at the Met.

Di Franco died on December 30, 2024, at age 82.

== Videography ==
- Mozart: Idomeneo (1982), Deutsche Grammophon DVD, 00440-073-4234, 2006
- The Metropolitan Opera Centennial Gala, Deutsche Grammophon DVD, 00440-073-4538, 2009
