= Philip Maero =

American opera singer

Philip J. Maero (October 2, 1924 – August 25, 2003) was an American operatic baritone, particularly associated with the Italian repertory. He was born in New York City. His family came from Piedmont, Northwest of Italy.

He studied voice first in New York City and later in Rome. He made his debut in Italy in 1951, on Italian Radio (RAI), where he sang as soloist for four years. His career was then abruptly interrupted when he contracted poliomyelitis. Once recovered, he successfully resumed his singing career, appearing first mostly in concert.

He made his American debut in 1947, as a soloist with the Naumburg Orchestral Concerts, in the Naumburg Bandshell, Central Park, in the summer series.

He continued his American work in 1955, at both the Lyric Opera of Chicago and the New York City Opera. He appeared at Carnegie Hall in 1959, in a concert version of Pizzetti's L'Assassinio nella cattedrale. He was especially admired in the title role of Rigoletto, and Germont in La traviata. He died in Tarpon Springs, Florida in 2003.

== Recordings ==
Maero left a few recordings for RCA Victor, notably as Enrico in Lucia di Lammermoor, opposite Roberta Peters, as Schaunard in La bohème, opposite Anna Moffo, and as Sharpless in Madama Butterfly, opposite Leontyne Price.

== Sources ==
- Operissimo.com
- Notice of Philip Maero's death
