= Bina =

Bina may refer to:

== Languages ==
- Bina language, a Kainji language of Nigeria
- Bina language (Papua New Guinea), an extinct Austronesian language

== Science and technology ==
- Bina (missile), an Iranian surface-to-surface and air-to-surface missile
- Bina Refinery, an oil refinery in Bina-Etawa, India
- Bina Thermal Power Plant, in Bina-Etawa, India
- BINA48, a robot
- Biphenylindanone A (BINA), a research agent
- Gorgyra bina, a butterfly species
- Schinia bina, a moth species

== Places ==
- Binə, Baku, Azerbaijan
- Binə, Khojavend, Azerbaijan
- Bina (river), Bavaria, Germany
- Bina-Etawa, Madhya Pradesh, India
- Bina Assembly constituency, Madhaya Pradesh, India
- Bina Railway Colony, Madhya Pradesh, India
  - Bina Junction railway station
- Bina River (India), Madhya Pradesh, India
- Bíňa, Slovakia
- Bina, North Carolina, US
- Bi'ina, Israel

== People ==
=== Surname ===
- Eric Bina (born 1964), American software programmer
- Malke Bina, American Orthodox Jewish feminist
- Martin Bína (born 1983), Czech cyclo-cross cyclist
- Robbie Bina (born 1983), American ice hockey player
- Shirin Bina (born 1964), Iranian actress
- Sima Bina (born 1945), Iranian traditional musician

=== Given name ===
- Bina may be a diminitive for the feminine given name Albina
- Bina Abramowitz (1865–1953), Russian-American Yiddish actress
- Bina Addy (1894–1962), Indian Bengali singer
- Bina Agarwal, Indian economist
- Bina Avrile, Italian shotgun shooter
- Bina Basnett (born 1984/5), Indian politician in Sikkim
- Bina Devi Budhathoki (born 1970), member of the Nepal House of Representatives
- Bina Cursiter (1854–1934), Scottish suffragist
- Bina D'Costa, Australian-Bangladeshi academic specializing in gender studies
- Bina Daigeler, German costume designer
- Bina Das (1911–1986), Indian revolutionary and nationalist from West Bengal
- Bina Deneen (1868–1950), first lady of Illinois, US, 1904–1912
- Bina Devi (born c. 1977), Indian farmer and entrepreneur
- Bina Devi (Nepalese politician), member of the Federal Parliament of Nepal
- Bina Jaiswal (born 1990), Nepalese politician
- Bina Kak (born 1954), Indian politician and actress
- Bina Lama, Nepalese politician
- Bina Landau (1925–1988), Polish-born American soprano folk and art singer
- Bina Sheth Lashkari, Indian educator
- Bina Magar (born 1983), Nepalese politician
- Bina West Miller (1867–1954), American businesswoman
- Bina Mistry, Tanzanian-born Indian-British Hindi/Gujarati singer
- Bina Mondal, Indian politician
- Bina Mossman (1893–1990), Hawaiian-American musician and politician
- Bina Paul (or Beena Paul) (born 1961), Indian film editor
- Bina Pokharel, Nepalese politician
- Bina Qeredaxi (born 1988), Iraqi filmmaker
- Bina Rai (1931–2009), Indian Hindi film actress
- Bina Ramesh (born 1979), New Caledonian javelin thrower
- Bina Rothschild (1902–1965), German aristocrat and actress
- Bina Shah (born 1972), Pakistani writer
- Bina Sharif, Pakistani-American playwright, actress, and director
- Bina Shaheen Siddiqui, Pakistani chemist
- Bina Shrestha, Nepalese politician
- Bina Singh, Indian politician
- Bina Kumari Thanet, Nepalese politician
- Bina Theeng Tamang (born 1980), Nepalese educator, writer, and poet
- Bina Venkataraman (born 1979), American science policy expert and journalist
- Bina Štampe Žmavc (born 1951), Slovene writer, poet, director and translator

== See also ==
- Beena (disambiguation)
- Binah (disambiguation)
- Vina (disambiguation)
