= Thene Manasulu =

Thene Manasulu may refer to these Indian films:

- Thene Manasulu (1965 film)
- Thene Manasulu (1987 film)

== See also ==
- Manaslu, 8th-highest mountain on Earth, located in Nepal
- Manasu (disambiguation)
