= Veena (disambiguation) =

The veena is a plucked musical instrument originating in India.

Veena may also refer to:

== Musical instruments ==
- Rudra veena, plucked string instrument used in Hindustani music
- Saraswati veena, plucked string instrument used in Carnatic music
- Vichitra veena, plucked string instrument used in Hindustani music
- Gottuvadhyam, plucked string instrument used in Carnatic music
- Alapini veena, historical veena, stick zither
- Ancient veena, Indian arched harp
- Eka-tantri veena, historical veena, tube zither
- Kinnari veena, historical veena
- Mohan veena, slide guitar
- Triveni veena, plucked string musical instrument
- Ranjan veena, plucked string musical instrument
- Bobbili Veena, plucked string musical instrument
- Misr veena, plucked string musical instrument

== Male given name ==
- Veena Kuppayyar (1798–1860), Indian exponent of the veena and composer of Carnatic music
- Veena Venkatagiriyappa (1887–1961), Indian musician

== Female given name ==
- Veena (actress) (1926–2004) also known as Veena Kumari, Indian actress
- Veena Das (born 1945), American professor of anthropology
- Veena Dubal, American lawyer and scholar
- Veena Goel (born 1981), American beauty queen
- Veena Malik (born Zahida Malik), Pakistani actress, model and comedian
- Veena Misra, American engineer
- Veena Talwar Oldenburg, Indian-born American history professor
- Veena Rawat, Canadian electrical engineer
- Veena Sahajwalla, Australian scientist and inventor
- Veena Sahasrabuddhe (1948–2016), Indian vocalist and composer of Hindustani classical music
- Veena Sud (born 1967), Canadian-born American television writer, director, and producer
- Veena Verma (writer) (born 1960), UK-based Punjabi short-story writer and poet

== Music label ==
- Veena Music, a regional music label based in Rajasthan, India

== See also ==
- Beena (disambiguation)
- Vina (disambiguation)
- Manasa Veena (disambiguation)
- Veen (disambiguation)
- Been (disambiguation)
