= Vina =

Vina may refer to:

== People ==
- Émilie Vina (born 1982), French cross-country skier
- Ionuț Vînă (born 1995), Romanian footballer
- Vina Bovy (1900–1983), Belgian operatic soprano
- Vina Crnoja (born 2000), Croatian-Bosna Herzefovina footballer
- Vina Mazumdar (1927–2013), Indian academic and feminist
- Vina Morales (born 1975), Filipina singer and actress
- Vina Jie-Min Prasad, Singaporean science fiction and fantasy writer
- Vina Fay Wray (1907–2004), Canadian/American actress
- Vina (footballer), Brazilian footballer Vinícius Goes Barbosa de Souza (born 1991)
- Vina Bovy, Belgian operatic soprano Malvina Bovi Van Overberghe (1900–1983)
- Vina Panduwinata, stage name of Indonesian singer and songwriter Vina Dewi Sastaviyana (born 1959)
- Marcos Vinicius (fighter) (born 1979), Brazilian mixed martial artist; nicknamed Vina
- Victor Vina, French film actor Victor Emanuel Jules Vinatieri (1885–1961)

== Places ==
=== Africa ===
- Vina (Africa), once a city and diocese of Roman Africa, now a Latin Catholic titular bishopric
- Vina (department), a department of the Adamawa province in Cameroon
- Vina River, Cameroon

=== Europe ===
- Vina, Croatia, a village near Vrgorac
- Vina (Knjaževac), Serbia, a village

=== United States ===
- Vina, Alabama, a town
- Vina, California, a census-designated place in Tehama County
- La Vina, California, a census-designated place in Madera County

== Other uses ==
- Veena, also spelled vina, an Indian stringed musical instrument
- Vina (Star Trek), a character in the Star Trek franchise
- Vina: Sebelum 7 Hari, a 2024 Indonesian drama horror film
- Vina, a 1993-1994 Philippine television program starring Vina Morales
- Vina, a walnut cultivar

== See also ==
- Veena (disambiguation)
- Viña (disambiguation)
- Bina (disambiguation)
