= Manas =

Manas may refer to:

== Philosophy and mythology ==
- Epic of Manas, a Kyrgyz epic poem which, in one variant, has over 500,000 lines
- Manas, the Pali and Sanskrit term for "mind"; see
  - Manas (early Buddhism)
  - Manas-vijnana, one of the eight consciousnesses taught in Yogacara Buddhism
- Ramcharitmanas, a retelling of the Ramayana

== Toponymy ==
- Manas River (Drangme Chhu) in southern Bhutan and northeastern India
  - Royal Manas National Park, a national park in Bhutan
  - Manas National Park, a national park in the state of Assam, India
- Manas (urban-type settlement), an urban-type settlement in Karabudakhkentsky District of the Republic of Dagestan, Russian Federation
- Manas, Drôme, a commune in Drôme département in France
- Manas-Bastanous, a commune in the Gers department in southwestern France
- Manas District, a district of Talas Province, Kyrgyzstan
  - Manas International Airport, an international airport near Bishkek in Kyrgyzstan
    - Transit Center at Manas, a United States Air Force base at the airport above
- Manas, Kyrgyzstan, town in the Talas District of Kyrgyzstan
- Manas (city), city in Kyrgyzstan
- Manas District, Peru, in the Peruvian province of Cajatambo
- Manas or Manasi River, a river in the Xinjiang Uighur Autonomous Region of China
  - Manas County, in the Xinjiang Uighur Autonomous Region, China
  - Manas Lake, a lake in the Xinjiang Uighur Autonomous Region of China
- Manasarovar (Lake Manas), a lake in Tibet

== People ==
- Mañas, Spanish surname
- Manas (given name), Indian given name

== Other uses ==
- Manas (film), a 2024 film by Marianna Brennand
- 3349 Manas, a main-belt asteroid
- Manas University, Kyrgyzstan
- MAN Türkiye A.Ş., stylized MANAŞ, MAN AG's truck and bus factory in Turkey
- MANAS Journal, a weekly philosophical journal published in 1948–1988
- Manas, a crablike Bionicle (Lego toy)

== See also ==
- Mana (disambiguation)
- Mansa (disambiguation)
- Manasu (disambiguation)
- Manasa Veena (disambiguation)
- Manasa, a Hindu goddess
