= Jane Stuart Smith =

American soprano (1925–2016)

- Smith in 1955
- Born: September 29, 1925; Norfolk, Virginia, U.S.
- Died: January 14, 2016 (aged 90); Roanoke, Virginia, U.S.
- Other names: Gianna Stuart
- Education: Hollins College; Juilliard School; Tanglewood Music Center
- Occupations: Operatic soprano; Hymnologist; Author
- Organizations: L'Abri

Jane Stuart Smith, also known on the stage as Gianna Stuart, (September 29, 1925 – January 14, 2016) was an American soprano, hymnologist, and author.

A native of Virginia, Smith trained as a singer at Hollins College, the Juilliard School, the Tanglewood Music Center, and privately under her principal voice teacher Ettore Verna. She had an active international career as an opera singer during the 1950s. Making her opera debut in Detroit in 1951, she had a prominent career in opera houses in Europe, especially Italy. She was acclaimed for her portrayals of Brünnhilde in Wagner's Ring cycle and the title role in Puccini's Turandot.

Smith abandoned her successful opera career after becoming a born-again Christian, making her last opera appearance in 1959. Thereafter she devoted her life to Christian service. She worked for the evangelical Christian organization L'Abri and resided in that organization's religious commune in Huémoz-sur-Ollon, Switzerland. In addition to her work as international secretary for L'Abri, she assisted in establishing a music ensemble at the organization with which she toured in public concerts. With fellow L'Abri worker Betty Carlson she co-authored several books, most of which were about hymns and hymn writers. In her later years she lived in Roanoke, Virginia, where she died in 2016. The History Museum of Western Virginia in Roanoke has a permanent exhibit dedicated to Smith.

== Early life and education ==
Jane Stuart Smith was born in Norfolk, Virginia, on September 29, 1925. The daughter of Robert Hall Smith and Mary Wysor Smith, she was the youngest of five children. Her father was the president of Norfolk and Western Railway, and her mother was a talented amateur soprano whose love of music influenced Jane's own music development. As a teenager she worked as a page at the White House while Franklin D. Roosevelt was president.

Smith was educated in Staunton, Virginia, at Stuart Hall School, and after graduating from there matriculated to Hollins College (HC) where she studied music and was first introduced to opera. She studied singing at HC and graduated with honors in 1947 with a bachelor's degree in music. She then pursued further studies in voice at the Juilliard School in New York City, and at the Tanglewood Music Center in Massachusetts. Her teachers at Juilliard included Coenraad V. Bos and Charles Panzéra, and at Tanglewood she studied under Boris Goldovsky and Robert Shaw. She also studied opera in Italy in 1949.

Upon returning to the United States, Smith pursued further studies with Ettore Verna. Verna became her primary and most influential voice teacher. He was the husband of soprano Mary Curtis Verna, and operated a highly regarded private voice studio in New York City. His pupils included many principal singers at the Metropolitan Opera.

== Singing career ==
Smith made her professional opera debut on May 18, 1951, in the title role of Puccini's Turandot at the Detroit Masonic Temple with the Detroit Grand Opera Festival. At that performance she wore the same costumes that Rosa Raisa, the original Turandot, had worn at the premiere of the opera, having been given the costumes by that singer after her retirement. Music critic James Dorsey Callaghan of the Detroit Free Press said in his review that "Miss Smith is a woman of commanding beauty, both of person and voice. Her Princess Turandot was a magnificent portrayal of the cruelty and opulence of the Orient". She reprised the role of Turandot later that year at La Fenice, and became acquainted with the artist Salvador Dalí while in Venice. When she met the artist he was wearing a fluorescent pink shirt with gloves to match, and when Smith asked him why he was wearing those particular clothes, he stated, "This is my answer to Italy's weak electricity system."

Smith was known on the Italian stage as Gianna Stuart. She sang Turandot again at several European opera houses in 1952, including the Opéra de Nice, the Teatro Massimo in Palermo, and the Teatro Massimo Bellini in Catania. She also performed that role at the Baths of Caracalla in Rome in the summer of 1952, after which she performed the title role in Ponchielli's La Gioconda at the Teatro Municipale in Reggio Emilia. She also sang Turandot at the Cairo Opera House (1954), the Cincinnati Opera (1955), and the Teatro Alessandro Bonci (1955) in Cesena. In 1956 she returned to Catania to perform the role of Brünnhilde in Wagner's Die Walküre. That same year she performed the title role in Bellini's Norma for the first time at the Teatro Ponti in Monza, Italy. In 1958 she returned to Palermo as Elena (Helen of Troy) in Boito's Mefistofele with Cesare Siepi in the title role, a production which was filmed and broadcast on Italian television on March 4, 1958. In 1959 she performed Turandot at the Teatro Petruzzelli in Bari.

In the early 1950s Smith performed on several broadcasts of the NBC Radio program The Railroad Hour. In 1953 she performed in concert with the United States Army Band at Carnegie Hall, a concert which was broadcast live on WNYC radio. That same year she starred opposite Gordon MacRae and Lucille Norman in a live radio broadcast of Victor Herbert's The Rose of Algeria on NBC Red Network radio, and reunited with that pair on the same network in 1954 for performances of Rudolf Friml's The Vagabond King. In 1959 she was the soprano soloist in Handel's Messiah with the Roanoke Symphony Orchestra.

Smith appeared in some operas opposite Maria Callas, and recalled that Callas would purposefully bend back the fingers of rival singers during curtain calls to cause them pain. Smith also performed in operas at the Teatro dell'Opera di Roma and the Teatro Carlo Felice during her career. Other roles she performed in European opera houses included Amelia in Verdi's Un ballo in maschera, Venus in Wagner's Tannhäuser, and the title roles in Verdi's Aida and Puccini's Tosca.

== Life at L'Abri and work as a writer ==
On the advice of a friend, Smith traveled to the headquarters of L'Abri, an evangelical Christian organization in Huémoz-sur-Ollon, Switzerland, in 1956. L'Abri's ministry welcomes religious seekers to stay on its property in the Swiss Alps so that they may discuss philosophical and religious beliefs. There Smith befriended the organization's founders, Francis and Edith Schaeffer, and through that relationship became a born-again Christian.

Two years after her conversion, Smith had what she considered a near-death experience on a plane flight from Geneva to Paris in which one of the aircraft's twin-engines failed. Smith stated that, "My prayer during that terrifying time was that if God allowed us to land safely, I would give the rest of my life into His hands." After arriving safely on the ground, Smith determined to leave her opera career behind, and forge a new life in Christian ministry working for L'Abri. Not long after she gave her last opera performance in 1959 as Brünnhilde in Wagner's Die Walküre. The testimony of her conversion and her decision to leave opera for a life in ministry was published in Gladys Hunt's Does Anyone Here Know God? (1959, Zondervan). When asked in an interview about giving up opera years later Smith stated: "I gave it up for the Lord. The world of opera is a wicked place. You have no idea about the temptations I faced." This was followed by a second question about whether opera was really that horrible to which Smith replied, "No, it was marvellous. That was the problem. I loved those temptations."

While Smith no longer appeared in operas, she did continue to perform, but always within music of a religious nature. She would occasionally appear in oratorios as a guest artist. She also assisted in establishing a music ensemble at L'Abri, a group with which she toured in programs of Christian music.

Because Smith was fluent in multiple languages, the Schaeffers appointed Smith international secretary for L'Abri. She also taught classes on music and theology to visiting college students, and devoted time to scholarship on hymn writing. One of her lecture subjects was on the theology of Johann Sebastian Bach's music. With Betty Carlson she co-authored the books A Gift of Music: Great Composers and Their Influence (1978, Good News Publishers) Favorite Women Hymn Writers (1990, Crossway Books), Favorite Men Hymn Writers (1993, Crossway Books), Great Christian Hymn Writers (1997, Crossway Books), and Great Women Authors: Their Lives and Their Literature (1999, Crossway Books).

== Later life ==
In addition to being colleagues, Smith and Carlson were longtime friends who lived together at Chalet Chesalet on L'Abri's Swiss property. Eventually the duo retired from L'Abri, left Switzerland, and returned to the United States. They resided in Roanoke during which time Smith cared for Carlson while she was living with Alzheimer's disease.

In her later years, Smith taught a Bible study class at St. John's Episcopal Church in Roanoke, and was a consultant for Opera Roanoke. In 2012 she was honored by that opera company and the History Museum of Western Virginia, an institution which has since installed a permanent exhibit about Smith.

Smith died in Roanoke, Virginia, on January 14, 2016.
