= Mansa =

Mansa may refer to:

== Places ==
=== India ===
- Mansa, Gujarat, a town in northern Gujarat, Western India; the capital of:
  - Mansa, Gujarat Assembly constituency
  - Mansa State, a princely state under the Mahi Kantha Agency in India
- Mansa district, India
  - Mansa, Punjab, the main town in the Indian district
    - Mansa, Punjab Assembly constituency

=== Zambia ===
- Mansa District, Zambia, a district of Luapula province, Zambia
  - Mansa, Zambia, capital of the Luapula province

=== Elsewhere ===
- Mansa Cove, Antarctica
- Barra Mansa, Brazil

== Religion ==
- Mata Mansa Devi Mandir, a temple in Panchkula district, Haryana, India
- Mansa Devi Temple, Haridwar, a temple in the state of Uttarakhand, India
- Roman Catholic Diocese of Mansa, Zambia

== People ==
- Johan Ludvig Mansa (1740–1820), German-Danish landscape gardener
- Mansa Devi, wife of Guru Amar Das (1479–1574), the third Sikh Guru
- Mansa Ram, Indian politician

== Other uses ==
- MANSA, a quality-of-life assessment tool
- Mansa (title), held by rulers of the medieval Malian Empire
- Mansa (wasp), a genus of wasps in the tribe Aptesini

== See also ==
- Mansa Assembly constituency (disambiguation), assembly constituencies in India
- Mansa District (disambiguation)
- Manasa, a Hindu goddess
  - Mansa Devi Temple (disambiguation)
- Manasa Veena (disambiguation)
- Mansar (disambiguation)
- Manas (disambiguation)
