= The Dutch Trio =

Chamber musical ensemble 1899–1910

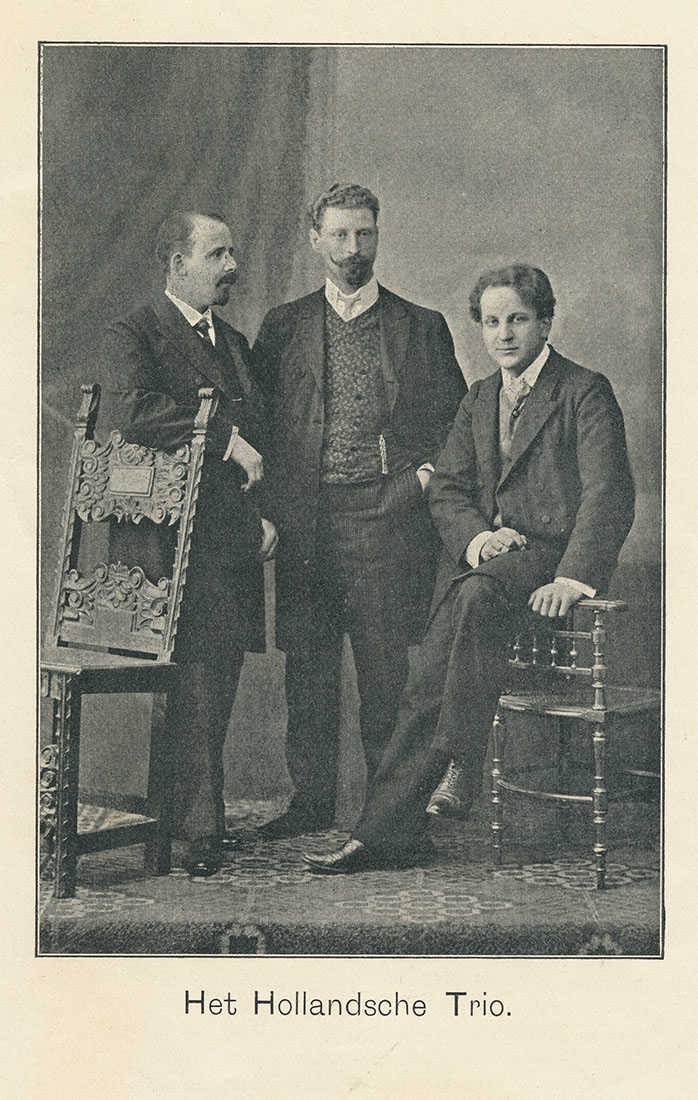

Background information
- Origin: Berlin
- Genres: classical, chamber music
- Instrument(s): Piano trio: piano, violin, cello
- Years active: 1899–1910
- Past members: Coenraad Valentijn Bos, piano (1899–1910); Jacques van Lier, cello (1899–1910); Joseph van Veen, violin (1899–1909); Marcellus van Gool, piano (1908–1909); Hugo Heermann, violin (1909–1910)

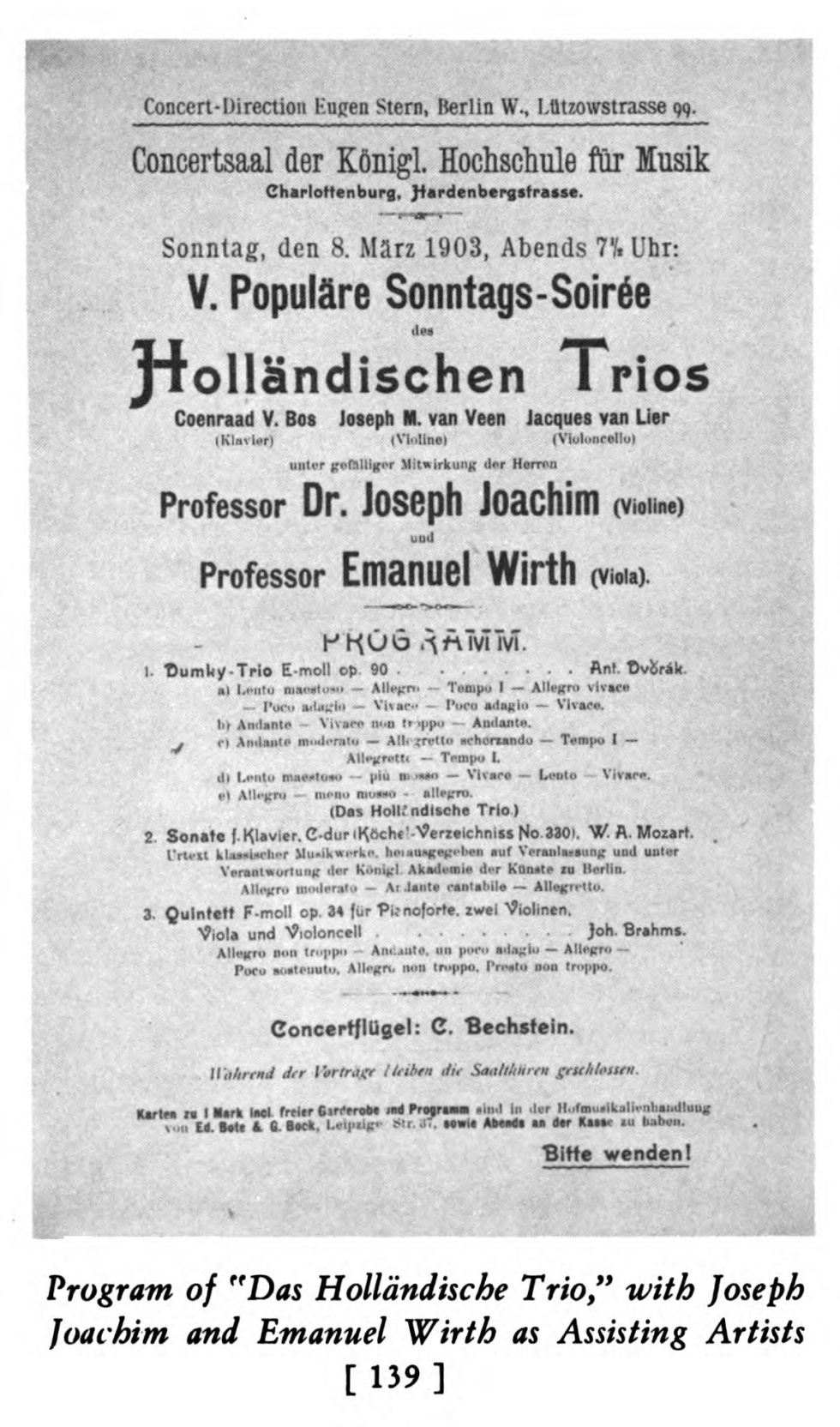
Poster of the concert of the Dutch Trio with Joseph Joachim and Emanuel Wirth, Berlin, March 8, 1903

The Dutch Trio (Dutch: Het Hollandse Trio; German: Das Holländische Trio) was a musical ensemble for chamber music, consisting of Coenraad Valentijn Bos (piano), Joseph van Veen (violin) and Jacques van Lier (cello), that was very successful in Berlin between 1899 and 1910 because of their tasteful choice of repertoire and careful interpretation. The piano trio gave performances throughout Germany and also in Italy, France, the Netherlands and Denmark.

== Career ==
Van Veen had played with Bos since 1897 in a duo for piano and violin and with Van Lier in a string quartet. The three men united in 1899 to form "Das Holländische Trio". They made their debut on April 28, 1899, in Berlin with a concert dedicated in its entirety to the works of Eduard Behm. In the fall of 1899, they also made their debut in the Netherlands.

In Berlin on December 4, 1899, the Dutch Trio performed during a fundraiser benefiting the cause of the Boer during the Second Boer War. The musical part of the event was very successful, according to critics, especially because of the Dutch Trio's performance of Mozart´s piano trio nr.2 in G major K 496.

On January 10, 1902, the "Trio Hollandais" made their debut in Paris, in the Nouvelle Societé Philharmonique, playing the Piano Trio No. 3 by Brahms and Mozart's piano trio mentioned earlier. The critic praised their uniform sound and faithful reproduction.

In his memoirs, Bos recalls that the famous violinist Joseph Joachim, Van Veen's teacher, wrote a very positive letter about the trio's concert in the hall of the Berlin University of the Arts in March 1903. Joachim himself and Emanuel Wirth were invited as guests to play with the Dutch Trio Brahms' Piano quintet.

In January 1904, "Il trio olandese" visited Venice resulting in two well-received concerts in La Fenice.

On March 16, 1906, the Dutch Trio performed in the Singakademie in Berlin together with the mezzo-soprano Julia Culp and three other singers. The concert was dedicated to Beethoven´s arrangement of Welsh and Scottish songs (such as The Cottage Maid and Faithful Johnnie). As an intermezzo, Beethoven´s piano trio op. 70/2 was played.

At a concert dedicated to the tenor Ludwig Wūllner, as part of his tour of 18 performances in the Netherlands with Coenraad Bos, the Dutch Trio played on October 31, 1906 for the first time in the Concertgebouw. Together with the Concertgebouworkest conducted by Willem Mengelberg the Triple concerto by Beethoven was performed. De Tijd was full of praise about Bos but expressed doubts about the other two members of the ensemble.

The acclaim endured in Berlin according to a review in 1908 that describes a very highly regarded trio that had been active for ten years. In particular, cellist Jacques Van Lier was commended. However, the solo capabilities of the other two musicians did not completely convince Het Nieuws van den Dag.

In March 1908, the Dutch Trio gave two concerts in the Casino in Copenhagen that caused an uproar. After the first concert, Politiken had written that Van Veen was a dilettante. Before starting the second concert, Van Veen insisted that the correspondent of the newspaper exit the hall before they would play even a single note. Van Veen gained support for this demand from the audience, forcing the reporter to leave.

In the Winter of 1908/1909, Marcellus van Gool replaced pianist Bos who was traveling in the United States. Later in 1909, Van Veen left the trio to settle in the Hague. He was replaced by the German violinist Hugo Heermann.

The last mention of the Dutch Trio of Bos, Van Veen or Van Lier in a Dutch newspaper is on December 13, 1910. It was reported that a tour of the trio in Spain could not take place because Bos had broken his leg. The commitments in Spain were taken on by the newly formed Heermann-Van Lier String Quartet with Maxim Ronis (second violin) and Ernst Breest (viola), who traveled to Spain after their concerts in Vienna and Paris.

== After 1910 ==
In 1911, the name of the Dutch Trio was used by an entirely different piano trio, consisting of Jeannette Mossel-Belinfante (piano), Aldo Antonietti (violin) and Isaäc Mossel (cello), later known as the Trio Mossel. Another piano trio used the name in 1913: Johan Hoorenman (piano), Willem Gerke (violin) and Bertram Drilsma (cello). The name was subsequently used many times, and not only by piano trios.

The success of the piano trio with Bos, Van Veen and Van Lier between 1899 and 1910 probably helped popularize the name. In fiction the name "Dutch Trio" is used to signify success in music. In the novel Julian by Elisabeth Overduyn-Heyligers published circa 1916, the main character of the same name is a young violinist living in Berlin. He starts to receive notice after he is asked to play as a substitute in The Dutch Trio. Rinke Tolman wrote a devastating critique of the novel.

== Dedicated works ==
Several composers have dedicated works to the Dutch Trio:

- Christian Sinding: Piano Trio No. 2
- Philipp Scharwenka: Piano Trio, Op. 112
- Eduard Behm: Piano Trio, Op. 14
- Hugo Kaun: Piano Trio No. 2, Op. 58
