= Lina Coen =

French-American musician (1878–1952)

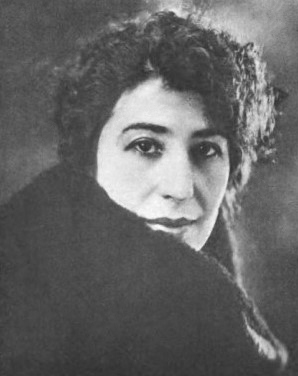

Background information
- Born: Caroline Marie Cohen; September 21, 1878; Paris, France
- Died: April 13, 1952 (aged 73) Miami, Fl
- Genres: Classical
- Occupations: pianist, vocal coach, conductor
- Instrument: piano
- Years active: 1896-1947

Lina Coen (born Caroline Marie Cohen; September 21, 1878 – April 13, 1952) was a French-American musician of Dutch descent. She won acclaim as a pianist and vocal coach and was the first woman in the United States to conduct an opera.

== Life ==
Coen was born as Caroline Marie Cohen in Paris on September 21, 1878, to Hippolijte Cohen, diamond merchant, and Mathilde Schoijer. Both her parents were nationals of the Netherlands.

Coen married Dutch cellist Jacques van Lier in Berlin in 1899. They had one child, Felicia Anne van Lier, born in 1901. The couple divorced in 1907 but stayed in Berlin until the outbreak of World War I. In August 1914 Coen travelled with her ex-husband and her daughter to Eastbourne, England. Coen continued her voyage alone to settle in New York City in November 1914. In 1925, she obtained US citizenship under the name Lina Coen, renouncing her French and Dutch citizenship in the process.

After her father's death, Coen returned to Paris in 1921 to take her mother to New York. Coen took care of her mother until she died at age 93 in New York in 1942. Coen then moved to Miami to live with her daughter Felicia “Sousie” Van Lier Browne, residing with her daughter's family that included her daughter's husband Van M. Browne and their children Carolyn Browne Dundes, Roger E. Browne and Peter V. Browne.

== Career ==
=== Pianist ===
Coen graduated from the Conservatoire de Paris, where she studied piano with Élie-Miriam Delaborde. She gave her first known concert in the Kurhaus in Scheveningen in 1896. At 17 years of age, she played the Hungarian Rhapsody no. 11 (Liszt) and the Capriccio Brillant (Mendelssohn), accompanied by the Berlin Philharmonic Orchestra under the direction of Frans Mannstädt. Her future husband, Jacques van Lier, played 2nd cello that afternoon. Shortly afterwards, she moved to Berlin. Coen was solo-pianist in a concert of the Berlin Philharmoniker conducted by Josef Řebíček, performing the Piano Concerto (Schumann). The next year, Coen obtained a contract for a series of 45 concerts throughout Germany. With her fiancé, she was part of a chamber music trio, with violinist Margarethe Baginsky. The German newspaper "Neuen Zeitschrift für Musik" found it a worrisome sign of possible times ahead, should women's rights activists get their way, that the two women overpowered the man. In April 1905, Coen and Van Lier gave concerts in Leipzig and Erfurt with the German contralto Grete Hentschel. They opened with the Variations on a Rococo theme (Tchaikovsky). The critics were especially pleased with Coen's playing. Coen also tried her hand at composing: between 1896 and 1906, three of her compositions were published in Paris in the series "Pensée: pour piano".

Coen became famous as collaborative pianist and répétiteur. As early as 1908, she accompanied Alexander Heinemann on a tour through the Netherlands and England. Her debut in New York was in Carnegie Hall in January 1915, when she supported Olive Fremstad on the piano. She became the official pianist of Leon Rothier of the Metropolitan Opera with whom she toured Canada. In 1920, Coen spent nine weeks on tour with Marie Rappold, including Texas, Missouri, Oklahoma and Kansas. In addition to serving as Rappold's accompanist on the piano, Coen performed as a soloist, playing Rhapsody No. 11 and Consolations (Liszt) as well as Poèmes by Dubois, music that she frequently performed, that was sometimes complemented by encore performances of Waltz in C-sharp minor (Chopin) and the Gavotte from Iphigénie en Tauride (Glück) in the arrangement by Brahms. In 1929, she accompanied Rappold for concerts in the Netherlands, the birthplace of Coen's parents and grandparents. They played the Koninklijk Concertgebouw and Diligentia.

=== Opera conductor and vocal coach ===
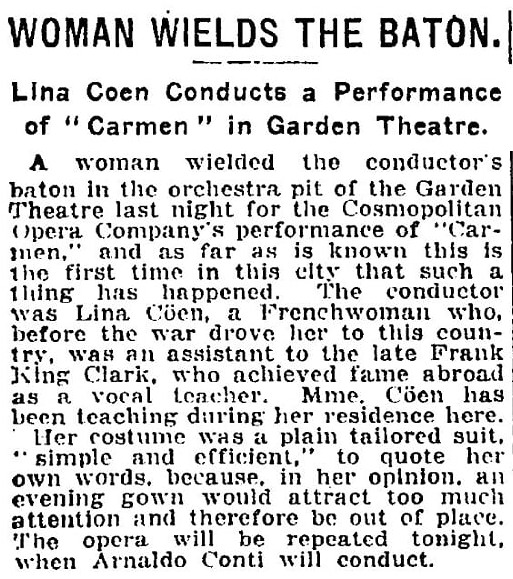
Article in The New York Times, February 8, 1917, p. 10

Coen was reportedly the first woman in the US known to conduct an opera, according to the New York Review (February 10, 1917) in an article entitled, “Woman Conducts Carmen Performance at Garden Theatre: Mme. Coen is First of Sex to Wield Baton in Grand Opera in America”, which quotes Coen's response to a question about her dress:

An evening gown would be out of place. Woman invades the orchestra pit not with the idea of making a sartorial display of herself, as is the case in so many instances where the box of the opera house is concerned. I want to attract attention solely by the caliber of my reading of the score of Carmen. There is not a role in the opera in which I have not coached singers who are among the foremost exponents of those particular roles, and this, I believe, gives me a greater grasp of the possibilities of the score, than perhaps some conductors display

The opera was staged by the Cosmopolitan Opera Company and featured Marta Wittkowska as Carmen, Enrico Arenson as Don Jose and Auguste Bouillez as Escamillo.

Among the singers who coached with Coen were Marion Telva, Julia Culp, Jeanne Gordon, Carl Jörn, Orville Harrold, Marie Tiffany, Geneviève Vix, Claire Dux and many others.

Her career as conductor continued in 1921 when she worked with Leon M. Kramer and conducted La Juive, at the Lexington Opera House in New York under the auspices of the Jewish American Opera Company, the first time a Grand Opera was performed in the US in Yiddish. After this, Coen focused on her role as vocal coach until in 1944 when she became the musical director for her third opera, Engelbert Humperdinck´s Hansel and Gretel, presented by the University of Miami School of Music, where she had worked since 1943 as a vocal trainer.

Coen died in Miami, Florida, in 1952, at age 73.

== Awards ==
- 1928: Ordre des Palmes Académiques in the rank of Officier d´Académie
