= Been =

Been may refer to:

- To be
- Have been
- Been (surname)
- Beens, an ethnic group of Bangladesh
- Pungi or been, an Indian wind instrument
- Rudra veena or been, a string instrument

== See also ==
- Bean (disambiguation)
- Beena (disambiguation)
- Veena (disambiguation)
