= Mañas =

Mañas is a Spanish surname. Notable people with the surname include:

- Achero Mañas (born 1966), Spanish film director
- Aitor Mañas (born 2003), Spanish footballer
- Fernando Llorente Mañas (born 1990), Spanish footballer
- José Ángel Mañas (born 1971), Spanish writer
- Pilar Mañas Brugat (born 1975), Spanish military officer

== See also ==
- Manas (disambiguation)
- Manas Family, an Ottoman-Armenian family
- Edgar Manas (1875–1964), Turkish-Armenian composer, conductor, and musicologist
