= Vina oil shale deposit =

- Location: Vina, Zaječar District, Serbia
- Products: Oil shale

The Vina oil shale deposit is an oil shale deposit located in Vina, Zaječar District, Serbia. The mine has oil shale reserves amounting to 850 million tonnes, one of the largest oil shale reserves in Serbia and Europe and has an organic content equivalent to 22.1 million tonnes of shale oil.
