= Hugo Heermann =

German violinist

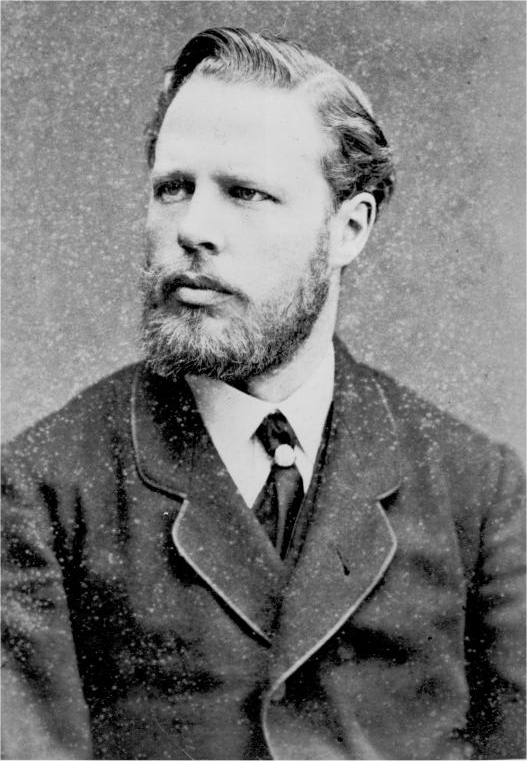
Hugo Heermann 1875

Hugo Heermann (3 March 1844, in Heilbronn – 6 November 1935, in Meran, Italy) was a German violinist. He studied the violin with Lambert Joseph Meerts at the Koninklijk Conservatorium in Brussels, and later with Joseph Joachim. From 1864 he lived in Frankfurt am Main, where he taught violin from 1878 to 1904 at the Hoch Conservatory. He played in the first performance of Dvořák's second Piano Quartet. He played 1st violin with Hugo Becker, Fritz Bassermann and Adolf Rebner in the "Museums-Quartett" (also called the "Heermann-Quartett" and "Frankfurter Quartett"). Between 1906 and 1909 he taught at the Chicago Musical College, in 1911 at the Stern Conservatory in Berlin and 1912 at the Conservatoire de musique in Geneva. In 1909 and 1910 he briefly was a member of The Dutch Trio, which transposed into the Heermann-van Lier String Quartet. He served as concertmaster of the Cincinnati Symphony Orchestra for a period beginning in 1909; he was succeeded in that post by his son Emil. He has the distinction of having been the first to have played Brahms' Violin Concerto in Paris, New York City and Australia. After his retirement in 1922 he lived mostly in Meran, Italy.

== Publications ==
- Charles Auguste de Bériots École transcendentale du violon. Hugo Heermann, Ed., 1896.
- Heermann, Hugo: Meine Lebenserinnerungen. Leipzig: 1935

== Literature ==
- Cahn, Peter. Das Hoch'sche Konservatorium in Frankfurt am Main (1878–1978), Frankfurt am Main: Kramer, 1979.
- Baker's Biographical Dictionary of Musicians, (Nicolas Slonimsky, Ed.) New York: G. Schirmer, 1958.
