= Frank Schaeffer =

American author and film director (born 1952)

- Born: August 3, 1952 (age 74); Champéry, Switzerland
- Other names: Francis Schaeffer; Francis A. Schaeffer; Franky Schaeffer
- Occupations: Author; film director; screenwriter; public speaker
- Parent(s): Francis Schaeffer, Edith Seville

Frank Schaeffer (born August 3, 1952) is an American author, film director, screenwriter, and public speaker. He is the son of theologian and author Francis Schaeffer. He became a Hollywood film director and author, writing several novels depicting life in a strict evangelical household including Portofino, Zermatt, and Saving Grandma.

While Schaeffer was a conservative, fundamentalist Christian in his youth, he has changed his views, becoming a liberal Democrat and a self-described Christian atheist. He lives north of Boston.

== Life and career ==
Schaeffer was born in Switzerland in 1952, the son of American missionaries Francis and Edith Schaeffer. He worked with his father and other members of the Religious Right in the 1970s making films, writing books, and speaking at churches and other venues. In the 1980s he continued to write on religious and political themes but also directed several Hollywood movies.

He converted from Presbyterian Calvinism to Eastern Orthodox Christianity in 1990.

Schaeffer's publishing house, Regina Orthodox Press, released Seraphim Rose: The True Story and Private Letters, a 2000 biography of hieromonk Seraphim Rose by Rose's niece Cathy Scott that included Rose's sexuality, which was a topic of controversy among some Eastern Orthodox faithful after the book was published.

In 2006, Schaeffer published Baby Jack, a novel about a US Marine killed in Iraq. He also wrote non-fiction books related to the Marine Corps, including Keeping Faith: A Father-Son Story About Love and the United States Marine Corps, co-written with his son John Schaeffer, and AWOL: The Unexcused Absence of America's Upper Classes from Military Service and How It Hurts Our Country, co-authored with former Bill Clinton presidential aide Kathy Roth-Douquet.

In 2007, Schaeffer published his autobiography, Crazy for God: How I Grew Up As One of the Elect, Helped Found the Religious Right and Lived to Take All (or Almost All) of It Back, in which he goes into detail about growing up in the Schaeffer family and around L'Abri. In 2011, he published another memoir, Sex, Mom, and God, in which he discusses growing up with his parents and their role in the rise of the American religious right and argues that the root of the "insanity and corruption" of this force in US politics, and specifically of the religious right's position on abortion, is a fear of female sexuality.

The two memoirs form the first and third book of what Schaeffer calls his "God trilogy". The second one, Patience with God: Faith for People Who Don't Like Religion (or Atheism) (2010), describes his spirituality as it exists since abandoning conservative evangelicalism. The first half contains critiques of both the New Atheists and of Christian fundamentalism.

Starting with his 2014 book Why I Am an Atheist Who Believes in God, he has described himself as an atheist, saying that even though he attends church every weekend and prays, "I do not always believe, let alone know, if God exists. I do not always know he, she, or it does not exist either, though there are long patches in my life when it seems God never did exist." Schaeffer has stated that one of the goals of his book is to "unhook [young Evangelicals] from allegiance to the Bible".

== Political views ==
Schaeffer has gone from being a conservative Republican to becoming a liberal Democrat.

When Schaeffer was young, he and his father attended meetings with Jack Kemp, as well as presidents Gerald Ford, Ronald Reagan, and George H. W. Bush. He helped produce Reagan's book Abortion and the Conscience of a Nation.

Schaeffer has written: "In the mid 1980s I left the Religious Right, after I realized just how very anti-American they are (the theme I explore in my book Crazy For God)." He added that he was a Republican until 2000, working for Senator John McCain in that year's primaries, but that after the 2000 election he re-registered as an independent.

=== Party switch ===
On February 7, 2008, Schaeffer endorsed Senator Barack Obama for the Democratic Party's presidential nomination, in an article entitled "Why I'm Pro-Life and Pro-Obama." The next month, prompted by the controversy over remarks by the pastor of Obama's church, he wrote: "[W]hen my late father – Religious Right leader Francis Schaeffer – denounced America and even called for the violent overthrow of the US government, he was invited to lunch with presidents Ford, Reagan and Bush, Sr."

After the 2008 Russo-Georgian War, Schaeffer described Russia as a resurgent Orthodox Christian power, paying back the West for its support of Muslim Kosovar secessionists against Orthodox Serbia.

On October 10, 2008, a public letter to Senator John McCain and Sarah Palin from Schaeffer was published in the Baltimore Sun newspaper. The letter contained an impassioned plea for McCain to arrest what Schaeffer perceived as a hateful and prejudiced tone of the Republican Party's election campaign. Schaeffer was convinced that there was a pronounced danger that fringe groups in America could be goaded into pursuing violence. "If you do not stand up for all that is good in America and declare that Senator Obama is a patriot, fit for office, and denounce your hate-filled supporters... history will hold you responsible for all that follows."

Soon after Obama's inauguration, Schaeffer criticized Republican leaders:

How can anyone who loves our country support the Republicans now? Barry Goldwater, William F. Buckley and Ronald Reagan defined the modern conservatism that used to be what the Republican Party I belonged to was about. Today no actual conservative can be a Republican. Reagan would despise today's wholly negative Republican Party.

In an interview on October 23, 2009, Schaeffer said his and his father's (Francis) position on abortion was co-opted by people looking for an issue that could shift political power within America.

In 2012, Schaeffer criticized the Republican Party's opposition to abortion rights, something which received criticism from Rod Dreher and other conservative Christians.

== Works ==
=== Books ===
- Confronting Christofacism: Healing the Evangelical Wound, (co-authored with Carolyn Baker), Apocryphile Press, 2021. ISBN 9781949643947
- Fall in Love, Have Children, Stay Put, Save the Planet, Be Happy, Health Communications, Incorporated, 2021. ISBN 9780757324116
- Letter to Lucy: A Manifesto of Creative Redemption—In the Age of Trump, Fascism and Lies, self-published, 2017.
- Why I Am an Atheist Who Believes in God: How to Give Love, Create Beauty and Find Peace, self-published, 2014. ISBN 978-1-49595501-3
- And God Said, "Billy", Colorado: Outskirts Press, 2013. ISBN 978-1-478-70001-2
- Sex, Mom, and God: How the Bible's Strange Take on Sex Led to Crazy Politics—and How I Learned to Love Women (and Jesus) Anyway, Cambridge: Da Capo Press, 2011. ISBN 978-0-306-81928-5
- Patience with God: Faith for People Who Don't Like Religion (or Atheism), Cambridge: Da Capo Press, 2009. ISBN 978-0-306-81854-7
- How Free People Move Mountains: A Male Christian Conservative and a Female Jewish Liberal on a Quest for Common Purpose and Meaning (with Kathy Roth-Douquet), New York: HarperCollins Publishers, 2008. ISBN 978-0-06-123352-4
- Crazy for God: How I Grew Up as One of the Elect, Helped Found the Religious Right, and Lived to Take All (or Almost All) of It Back, New York: Carol & Graf Publishers (September) 2007. ISBN 978-0-7867-1891-7
- Baby Jack: A Novel, New York: Carol & Graf Publishers, (October) 2006. ISBN 9780786717163
- AWOL: The Unexcused Absence of America's Upper Classes from Military Service—and How It Hurts Our Country (with Kathy Roth-Douquet), New York: HarperCollins Publishers, 2006. ISBN 978-0-06-088859-6
- Voices from the Front: Letters Home From American's Military Family, New York: Carol & Graf Publishers, 2004. (Third of Military Trilogy) ISBN 978-0-7867-1462-9
- Faith of Our Sons: Voices From the American Homefront — The Wartime Diary of a Marine's Father, New York: Carol & Graf Publishers, 2004. (Second of Military Trilogy)
- Zermatt: A Novel, New York: Carol & Graf Publishers, 2003. (Third of Calvin Becker Trilogy) ISBN 978-0-7867-1259-5
- Keeping Faith: A Father–Son Story About Love and the U.S. Marine Corps (with son John Schaeffer), New York: Carol & Graf Publishers, 2002. (First of Military Trilogy)
- Saving Grandma: A Novel, New York: Berkley Books, 1997. (Second of Calvin Becker Trilogy)
- Letters to Father Aristotle, Salisbury, MA: Regina Orthodox Press, 1995. ISBN 9780964914100
- Dancing Alone: The Quest for Orthodox Faith in the Age of False Religion, Brookline, MA: Holy Cross, 1994. ISBN 9780917651366
- Portofino: A Novel, New York: Macmillan, 1992 (first of Calvin Becker Trilogy) ISBN 978-0-7867-1716-3
- Sham Pearls for Real Swine, Brentwood, TN: Wolgemuth & Hyatt, 1990-05-02.
- Is Capitalism Christian? (editor), Westchester, IL: Crossway Books, 1985. ISBN 978-0-89107-362-8
- Bad News for Modern Man as Franky Schaeffer, Westchester, IL: Crossway Books, 1984.
- A Modest Proposal (with Harold Fickett), Westchester, IL: Crossway Books, 1984.
- A Time for Anger: The Myth of Neutrality, Westchester, IL: Crossway Books, 1982.
- Addicted to Mediocrity: 20th Century Christians and the Arts, Westchester, IL: Crossway Books, 1982.

=== Films ===
- How Should We Then Live? The Rise and Decline of Western Thought and Culture (1976). Frank Schaeffer produced his father Francis Schaeffer's film series, which was released with a book by the same title.
- Whatever Happened to the Human Race? (1979). A Christian response to abortion, euthanasia, and infanticide, narrated by Francis Schaeffer and former Surgeon General Dr. C. Everett Koop; it was released with a book by the same title.
- Wired to Kill (1986). Writer/director. Post-apocalyptic action film starring Devin Hoelscher, and with Merritt Butrick.
- Headhunter (1989). Director. Occult horror film starring John Fatooh, June Chadwick, and Steve Kanaly.
- Rising Storm (1990). Director. Futuristic action film starring Zach Galligan and June Chadwick.
- Baby on Board (1992). Director. Slapstick comedy starring Judge Reinhold and Carol Kane.

== See also ==
- Crazy for God
- Republican and conservative support for Barack Obama in 2008
