= Stephen Crotts =

American theologian and author (1950–2026)

The Reverend Stephen M. Crotts
- Portrait of Stephen Crotts
- Born: April 14, 1950; Burlington, North Carolina, U.S.
- Died: April 13, 2026 (aged 75); Hillsborough, North Carolina, U.S.
- Resting place: New Hope Presbyterian Church, Chapel Hill, North Carolina
- Writings: List of Works: The Maximum Experience (1977); If you haven't Got A Prayer (1978); Special Delivery Christmas (1978); Majesty! (1982); Ripe Old Age (1981); Ten Commandments For Now (1987); How To Handle 15 of Life's Toughest Problems and Challenges (1991); The Story of Santa Claus (1992); Character (1992); The Beautiful Attitudes (1996); Wearing the Wind (1999); Long Time Coming! (2001); Heroes of the Faith Speak (2003); When the Wind Begins to Sing (2003)

Religious life
- Religion: Christianity
- Denomination: Presbyterian (ARP)
- Church: Protestant
- Profession: Preacher
- Education: Furman University (B.A.); Emory University (M.D.); L'Abri Fellowship; University of London
- Occupations: Presbyterian Reverend; Author; Public Speaker
- Ordained: 1975

Stephen Michael Crotts (April 14, 1950 – April 13, 2026) was an American Presbyterian minister and author during the Fourth Great American Awakening, and throughout the subsequent decades. He served as a minister for over 50 years, and wrote over 20 books. He was also the Director of the Carolina Study Center, a campus ministry organization based in Chapel Hill, North Carolina.

== Early life and career ==
Stephen Michael Crotts was born in Burlington, North Carolina on April 14, 1950, to George Byron Crotts (1924–2015) and Elizabeth Aiken (1928–2008). He attended Furman University, graduating in 1972. Crotts also attended Emory University, graduating in 1975. He and his wife, Kathryn Cook, had three children. He was a pastor in several congregations in Virginia, North Carolina, and South Carolina. He also worked with Canyon Ministries and its founder, Tom Vail. He wrote over twenty books in his career including:

- The Maximum Experience (1977)
- If you haven't Got A Prayer (1978)
- Special Delivery Christmas (1978)
- Majesty! (1982)
- Ripe Old Age (1981)
- Ten Commandments For Now (1987)
- How To Handle 15 of Life's Toughest Problems and Challenges (1991)
- The Story of Santa Claus (1992)
- Character (1992)
- The Beautiful Attitudes (1996)
- Wearing the Wind (1999)
- Long Time Coming! (2001)
- Heroes of the Faith Speak (2003)
- When the Wind Begins to Sing (2003)

== Later life and Death ==
He lived in Hillsborough, North Carolina, in his later years, directing the Carolina Study Center, a campus based ministry organization. He died in Hillsborough on April 13, 2026, one day before his 76th birthday.
