= Mansa Devi Temple =

Mansa Devi Temple, dedicated to the Hindu goddess Mansa Devi, may refer to these temples in India:

- Mata Mansa Devi Mandir, Haryana
- Mansa Devi Temple, Haridwar, Uttarakhand
- Shri Mansa Mata Mandir Hasampur, Sikar, Rajasthan

== See also ==
- Mansa (disambiguation)
