= Beena =

Beena may refer to:

== People ==
- Beena Banerjee (born 1943), an Indian actress commonly credited as Beena
- Beena Masroor (1958–2025), Pakistani actress
- Beena Sarwar, Pakistani journalist and activist
- Beena, a pen name of Parveen Shakir (1952–1994), a Pakistani poet

== Other ==
- Beena marriage, a pre-Islamic form of marriage among Arabic nomads
- Advanced Pico Beena, an educational console system by Sega Toys
- Beena, alternative spelling for the musical instrument veena
- Beena (film), an Indian Malayalam film released in 1978

== See also ==
- Been (disambiguation)
- Bina (disambiguation)
- Veena (disambiguation)
