= Been (surname) =

Been is a surname. Notable people with the surname include:

- Dick Been (1914–1978), Dutch footballer
- Dirk Been, American reality show contestant
- Harry Been (born 1949), Dutch football official
- Mario Been (born 1963), Dutch footballer and manager
- Michael Been (1950–2010), American musician
- Robert Levon Been (born 1978), American musician
- Saneita Been (born 1986), Turks and Caicos Islands beauty pageant winner
