= Mansa District =

Mansa District may refer to either of these districts:

- Mansa District, Zambia, in Luapula Province, Zambia
- Mansa district, India, in Punjab, India

== See also ==
- Mansa (disambiguation)
