= Ettore Verna =

Opera musician and voice teacher (1896–1962)

- Verna (right) teaches a student in his studio in New York City in 1950.
- Born: April 8, 1896; Lanciano, Kingdom of Italy
- Died: August 3, 1962 (aged 66); Nervi, Italy
- Occupations: Baritone; Vocal coach; Voice teacher; Talent agent; Opera director
- Spouse: Mary Curtis Verna (1954-1962)

Ettore Verna (April 8, 1896 (Note: Many published sources give Verna's birth year as 1902 including his obituaries in Opera News and Variety, and his entry in the Biography and Genealogy Master Index. This year also matches his given age of 60 in his 1962 obituary in The New York Times. However, this date does not match primary sources. Verna's WWI draft registration card gives his date of birth as April 8, 1896. This date also more closely matches the information regarding his age in his immigration documents through Ellis Island which states he was born in c. 1897. c. 1897 is also his recorded year of birth in the 1930 United States Federal Census.) – August 3, 1962) was an Italian-born American operatic baritone, vocal coach, voice teacher, talent agent and opera director. Initially raised in the Abruzzi region of Italy, Verna immigrated with his family to the United States in 1911 at the age of fifteen. A resident of Philadelphia, he began his professional life as a tailor in that city until he was drafted into the United States Army during World War I. While enlisted, the army used him as a singer in patriotic concerts sponsored by the government. After the war, he returned to Philadelphia where he ultimately began a professional opera career with the Philadelphia Civic Opera Company in 1925. He had an active career as a leading baritone in operas in the United States and in Europe over the next decade.

After 1935 Verna's career shifted towards work as a voice teacher in New York City. The husband of soprano Mary Curtis Verna, he was the vocal coach to several principal singers at the Metropolitan Opera. He also served briefly as director of the Empire Opera Company in 1939 and artistic director of the Grand Opera Spring Festival in Detroit in the 1950s. As a talent agent he was responsible for organizing the first appearances in the United States of sopranos Maria Callas and Anna Maria Alberghetti. He died at the age of 66 in 1962.

== Early life ==
Ettore Verna was from the Abruzzi region of Italy, and was born in the town of Lanciano on April 8, 1896. In his youth he immigrated with his parents to the United States where the family ultimately settled in Philadelphia. The Verna family boarded the SS Ancona in Naples on October 16, 1911, and arrived at Ellis Island on October 30, 1911.

After the passage of the Selective Service Act of 1917 during World War I, Ettore Verne was drafted into the United States Army at the age of 21 at a time when he was employed as a tailor at a business in Philadelphia located at 12th and Walnut Street. He obtained the rank of sergeant and was trained at Camp Sevier in South Carolina. Because of his excellent singing voice, the army employed him as a singer at government-sponsored patriotic concerts where his repertoire included both patriotic songs and opera arias. He was stationed at Fort Slocum in New York and was honorably discharged from the army on March 25, 1919.

== Singing career ==
In 1925 Verna made his opera debut as Tonio in the Philadelphia Civic Opera Company's production of Leoncavallo's Pagliacci at the Metropolitan Opera House (Met) in Philadelphia with conductor Alexander Smallens leading an orchestra made up of members of the Philadelphia Orchestra. Others in the cast included soprano Anna Fitziu as Nedda, Nelson Eddy as Silvio, and Fortunato De Angelis in the title role. After this he performed at opera houses in Italy before returning to the United States to join the roster of principal artists with the Apollo Grand Opera Company in Philadelphia in 1929. With this company he performed the roles of the Count di Luna in Il trovatore and Germont in La traviata, once again at Philadelphia's Met.

In 1932 Verna appeared in seasons of Italian operas at the Teatro Dal Verme in Milan and the Grand Théâtre de Genève in Switzerland, performing principal roles in Madama Butterfly, Rigoletto, Lucia di Lammermoor, The Barber of Seville, and Cavalleria rusticana among other operas. In May 1935 he made his New York City debut at the New York Hippodrome as Lord Ashton in Lucia di Lammermoor, a performance which The New York Times stated "made an agreeable impression with his smooth use of a resonant voice". In July 1935 his portrayal of the title role in Rigoletto at the Boston Opera House achieved national attention when a costume mishap caused the lower part of his costume to drop to his ankles, an event which Variety described as turning the tragedy into a comedy. Billboard in its review humorously stated that "Verna sang himself out of his pants" not just once, but twice.

== Voice teacher, opera director, talent agent, and later life ==
In 1939 Verna was director of the short-lived touring Empire Opera Company, and he later served as artistic director of the Grand Opera Spring Festival in Detroit in the 1950s. Before 1938 he had begun working as a vocal coach and voice teacher with soprano Luisa Tetrazzini as one of his students. He went on to become a prominent singing coach to performers at the Metropolitan Opera, including singers Eugene Conley, Zinka Milanov, Grace Moore, and Ramon Vinay. Other performers who studied with him included Kurt Baum, Germana Di Giulio, Kunie Imai, Florence Kirk, Martha Lipton, Tessie Mobley, Dorothy Sarnoff, Polyna Stoska, and Jane Stuart Smith.

Verna also worked as a theatrical booking agent. In 1949 he was responsible for bringing 13-year-old Italian soprano Anna Maria Alberghetti to the United States. The young performer drew wide acclaim for her debut at Carnegie Hall in the winter of that year, a performance which launched her career. In late 1953 he successfully convinced Maria Callas to come to Chicago to perform for the opening of the inaugural season of the Lyric Opera of Chicago. Her 1954 Chicago performance in the title role of Norma marked Callas's first appearance in the United States.

On August 3, 1954, Verna married the soprano Mary Curtis in Switzerland. Curtis was one of his voice students and had begun studying singing with Verna in 1952. She was with him when he died in Nervi, Italy, on August 3, 1962. It was their eighth wedding anniversary.
