= Cornélie van Zanten =

Dutch opera singer, singing teacher, and author

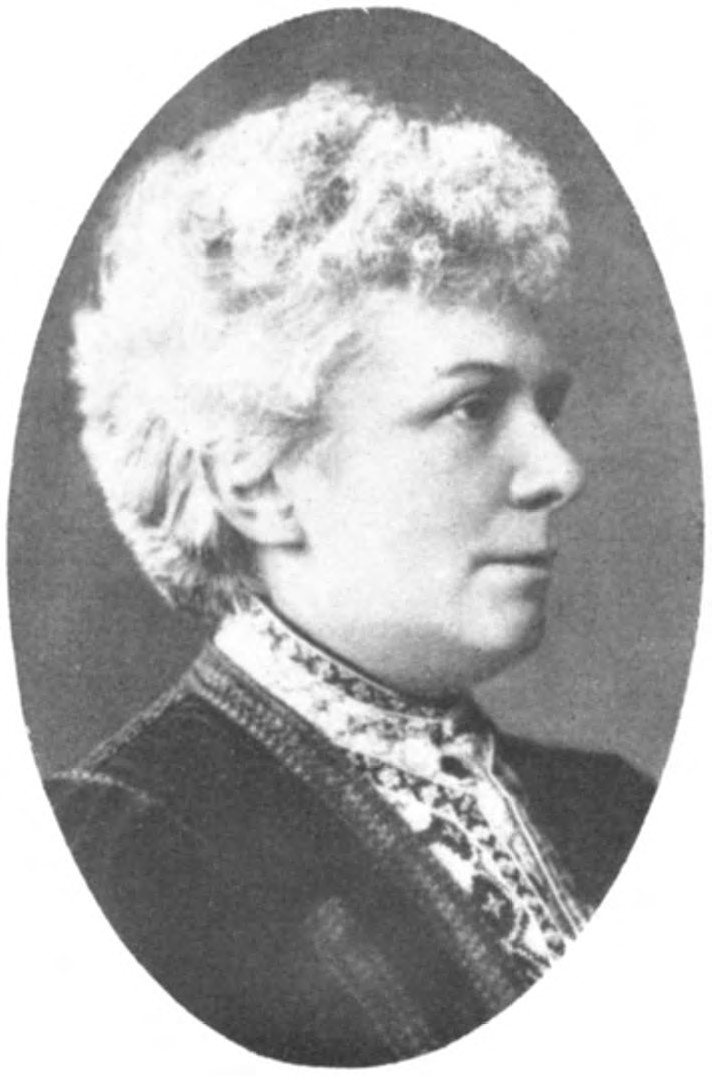
Cornélie van Zanten in 1911

Wijntje Cornelia van Zanten (August 2, 1855, in Dordrecht – January 10, 1946, in The Hague) was a Dutch opera singer, singing teacher and author. She sang both mezzo-soprano and alto.

Van Zanten also wrote her name as Cornélie or Cornelie and was known among friends as Corry or Kee.

== Biography ==
She studied at the conservatory of Cologne, among others, and then continued her studies in Milan under Francesco Lamperti. In September 1875 she made her debut in Turin, singing the role of Leonora in Donizetti's opera La Favorita. In 1879 she left Italy for Germany, where she sang at the opera of Breslau, Kassel (with Gustav Mahler as conductor) and Hamburg. During her German period she also composed a number of Lieder, including Mijn Moedertaal ("My Mother Tongue") in 1881.

In 1885 she was invited to join the American Opera Company at the Metropolitan Opera House in New York City. Soon after, she joined the National Opera Company for a lengthy tour of North America in the 1886-1887 season. Highlights of the tour were her roles as Orpheus in Gluck's Orfeo ed Euridice and the title role in Carmen by Bizet. After the company went bankrupt, she returned to Europe and worked in Russia (where she sang a complete Der Ring des Nibelungen by Wagner), in the Netherlands (where she sang at the Hollandsche Opera and the Nederlandse Opera), and in Germany.

Van Zanten ended her singing career in 1895 and accepted a position as senior professor of solo singing at the Amsterdam conservatory, coaching many well-known Dutch singers such as Jos Tijssen, Julia Culp and Tilly Koene.

She left Amsterdam for Berlin in 1903 to lead a Meisterschule für Kunstgesang (singing school), but returned to the Netherlands when World War I broke out. In 1914 she settled in The Hague, where she remained active as a teacher of classical singing. She lived to see the end of World War II and died in 1946, aged 90.

Van Zanten recorded her extensive knowledge of the art of singing and the workings of the human voice in a number of books, which appeared in both Dutch and German. Her book Bel Canto des Wortes: Lehre der Stimmbeherschung durch das Wort (1911) was considered a standard work for the teaching of classical singing. In 1923 she even made a film about the human voice. However, she never took the opportunity to make any recordings of her singing.
