= Manasa Veena =

Manasa Veena (lit. 'Mind Veena') may refer to:

- Maanasaveena, a 1976 Indian Malayalam-language film
- Manasa Veena (1984 film), an Indian Telugu-language film
- Manasa Veene, a 1987 Indian Kannada-language drama film

== See also ==
- Mansa (disambiguation)
- Manas (disambiguation)
- Veena (disambiguation)
