= Mansar =

Mansar can refer to:

- Lake Manasarovar, a sacred lake in Tibet, site of pilgrimages from India
- Mansar Lake, a lake in Jammu and Kashmir, India
- Mansar, India, a town in Maharashtra
- Mansar, Pakistan, town in Punjab, Pakistan

== See also ==
- Mansa (disambiguation)
- Manesar, a town in Haryana, India
