= Elena Gerhardt =

German opera singer

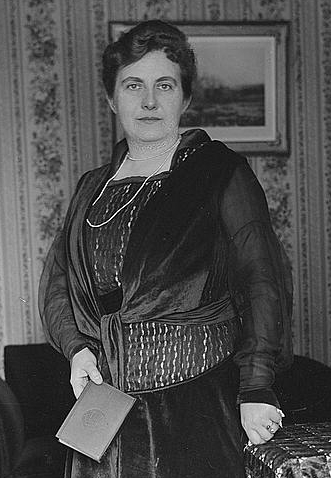
Elena Gerhardt

Elena Gerhardt (11 November 1883 – 11 January 1961), born Erdmude Juliana Frieda Gerhardt was a German mezzo-soprano singer associated with the singing of German classical lieder, of which she was considered one of the great interpreters. She emigrated to London in October 1934, where she died on 11 January 1961 aged 77.

== Between the wars ==
In early 1920, she made a prolonged tour of Spain with Paula Hegner, and later that year to the USA again, where her collaboration with the model accompanist Coenraad V. Bos began. This partnership was renewed in the winter season of 1921-22 in New York. In March 1922 (soon after the death of Nikisch) she braved the return to London (Queen's Hall) with Paula Hegner, where her German art was received with an ovation. That was the start of an unbroken tie with England, which later became her home. The following years saw annual winter tours in USA (and the Pacific Coast from San Francisco to Vancouver in 1925), with extensive tours in UK, Europe and Germany. There were further Spanish tours, including one in winter 1928 with Bos. She was then singing Schubert's Winterreise which, as a female singer, she made particularly her own. At the start of 1929 she became head teacher of singing at the Leipzig Conservatory, and after October 1930 she discontinued her American tours, though still touring intensively in Britain and Europe. One of her students in Leipzig was Indian contralto Bina Addy.

In 1928, she met and fell in love with Dr Fritz Kohl, Director of Administration of the Mitteldeutscher Rundfunk in Leipzig, and they married in November 1932. In London she reappeared before the Royal Philharmonic Society in January 1931, under John Barbirolli, to perform Wolf songs with orchestral accompaniment, and Mahler's Kindertotenlieder. Her Hugo Wolf Song Society recordings were made in 1932. Following Hitler's rise to power, Kohl was arrested and imprisoned, not being released until June 1935, the only one of the German Broadcasting Directors to be acquitted by the Reichsgericht in Leipzig. With the help of Landon Ronald at the Guildhall School of Music, Elena meanwhile got a foothold in London in 1934, and after a last visit to Bayreuth to see Strauss conduct Parsifal ('It was no longer Richard Wagner's Bayreuth, but Hitler's'), London became the settled home of the couple. Over the following years, as the storm gathered, Elena gave recitals in the Netherlands, France and Britain, often with Gerald Moore accompanying, and developed a circle of singing pupils.

== Wartime recitals in England ==
With the outbreak of war, Gerhardt expected that her singing career was at an end as there should be no taste for German music in Britain, especially as she would only sing in German, and the broadcast of the German language was forbidden on the BBC home programmes. However, Myra Hess insisted upon involving her in the National Gallery mid-day concerts, where she first appeared in December 1939, and afterwards in twenty-two concerts with Myra Hess or Gerald Moore, being very greatly appreciated. With Myra Hess and Lionel Tertis she sang the Brahms viola songs and other lieder recitals in many parts of England and Scotland, including a complete Winterreise in Reading, and in 1942 gave BBC lieder broadcasts to Argentina. Her teaching picked up again after 1941. With Myra Hess she sang at Haslemere for Tobias Matthay and his pupils. She gave a sixtieth birthday concert in the Wigmore Hall in 1943, and further National Gallery and Wigmore Hall concerts in 1944. News of the destruction of Leipzig and Dresden filled her with deep sadness.

The diarist James Lees-Milne recorded a performance of Schubert by Gerhardt on Wednesday, March 18, 1942 at the National Gallery in London: "Elena Gerhardt came out close to where we were sitting. She is an enormous woman with so dropsical a belly that it looks like a pillow tied to her front not belonging to her person at all. She wore a black velvet dress like a monk's habit, tied with a black cord round her middle. She must be about sixty but still has a voice. When she walked in she was beautifully powdered, her grey hair tied up, immaculate. When she came out all the powder was gone, her face shining with sweat. She was mopping her forehead with a handkerchief. Yet she looked happy, fulfilled. Where we were sitting it was difficult to hear her clearly, and her low notes not at all."

== Recordings ==
External audio
- Shellac recordings with Elena Gerhardt in the Online Archive of the Österreichische Mediathek

(See discography by Desmond Shawe-Taylor, with titles and number listings. Dates may be of recording or of issue.)

Acoustic recordings:

- 1907 G&T recordings with Arthur Nikisch (Wolf, Bungert, Brahms, Strauss, Rubinstein) - six 10" and one 12" record/seven songs.
- 1911 Red Label German His Master's Voice recordings with Arthur Nikisch (Wolf, Brahms, Bungert, Strauss, Schumann, Schubert, Wagner) - ten 10" and seven 12" records/seventeen songs.
- 1913-1914 as above, with Bruno Seidler-Winkler (pno) - eleven 10" records/songs. (Strauss, Brahms, Schubert, Wolf).
- 1913-1914 as above, with orchestra cond. Seidler-Winkler - five 12" records/songs. (Strauss, Wagner, Gluck, Wolf).
- 1915 American Columbia, about 7 titles with orchestral accompaniment. (J. Strauss, Schulz, Grüber, and folk-songs)
- 1923 Aeolian Vocalion with Ivor Newton (pno) - six 12" records/songs. (Schubert, Grieg, Schumann, Strauss, Brahms)
- 1924 as above, with Harold Craxton (pno) - six 12" records/songs. (Schubert, Strauss and Brahms)
- 1924-1925 HMV red label, with ?Harold Craxton (pno) - seven titles (three 10" 2-sided records and one side unissued). (Schubert, Schumann, Wolf and Brahms)

Electric recordings:

- 1926 HMV red label, with Paula Hegner - eight songs, three 10" and two 12" records. (Brahms, Schubert)
- 1927 HMV red label, with Coenraad V. Bos - three songs, two 12" records. (Brahms, Reger)
- 1928 HMV Black Label Schubert Centenary Album - seven 12" and one 10" record (eight items from Winterreise, and ten other songs).
- 1929 HMV black label, with Harold Craxton - one 12" record, three songs (Brahms).
- 1929 HMV black label, with Coenraad V. Bos - two 12" records, six songs (Brahms).
- 1929 HMV red label, with Bos - one 10" record, three songs (Schubert and Wolf).
- 1929 HMV red label, with Bos - one 12" record, two songs (Schumann): another two sides of Schumann were recorded at this time (Wer machte dich so krank, and Alte Laute), but were not issued.
- 1932 HMV red label Hugo Wolf Society Volume I, with Coenraad V. Bos - six 12" records, nineteen songs.
- 1939 HMV White Label, privately published, with Gerald Moore - six 10" records, GR16-GR21. (Brahms, Complete Zigeunerlieder (eight songs), three other songs; Schubert (four), Wolf (two)).
- 1947-1948 HMV White Label, privately published, with Gerald Moore - (Schumann, Frauenliebe und -leben Complete, three 12" records). Also Schumann's Meine Rose was recorded, on one 12"" side, but was not issued.
