= Viña =

Viña (vineyard in Spanish and Galician) or La Viña may refer to:

== Places ==
- La Viña Department, Salta, Argentina
  - La Viña, Salta, a village and rural municipality
- Viña, Buenos Aires, Argentina.
- La Viña, Catamarca, Argentina, a village and municipality
- La Viña Canton, Bolivia
- La Viña Airport, Coquimbo Region, Chile

== People ==
- Antonio La Viña (born 1959), Filipino lawyer and academic
- Fernando Viña (born 1969), American former Major League Baseball player and analyst
- Josephine de la Viña (1946–2011), Filipino discus thrower
- Matías Viña (born 1997), Uruguayan footballer
- Viña Delmar (1903–1990), American playwright

== See also ==
- Vina (disambiguation)
- Veena
