= Coenraad V. Bos =

Dutch pianist

External audio
- Shellac recordings with Coenraad Valentijn Bos in the Online Archive of the Österreichische Mediathek
- Accompanying Julia Culp on YouTube

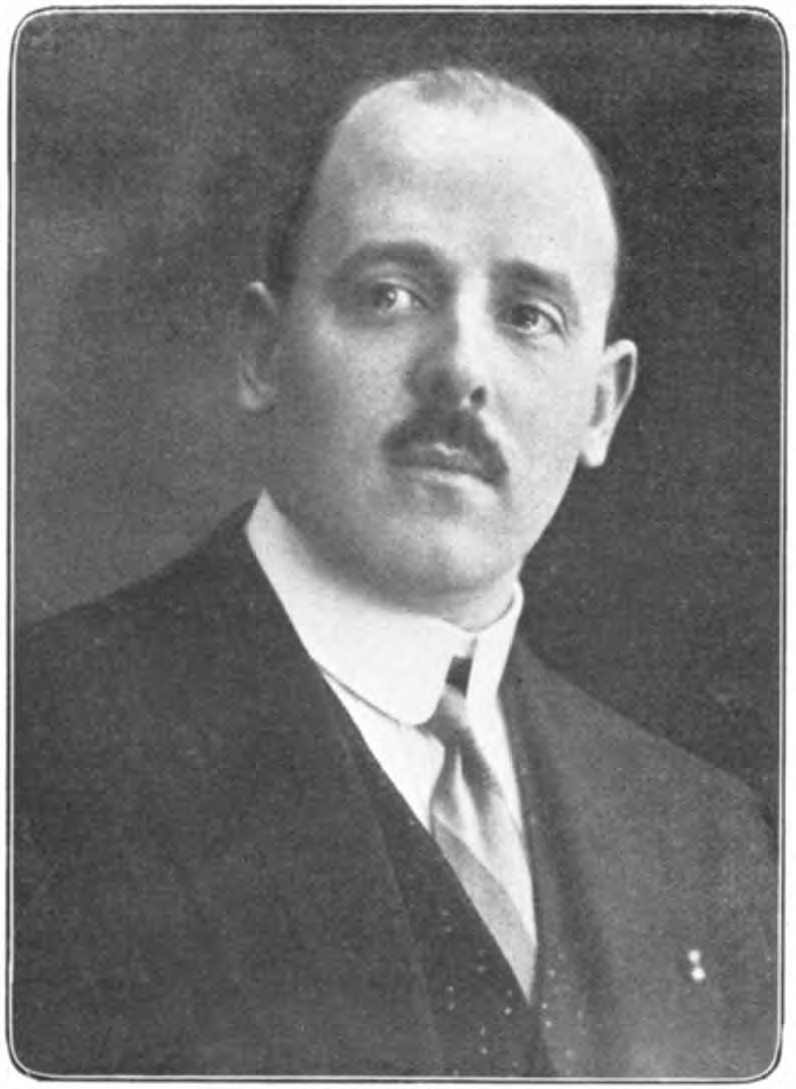
Coenraad V. Bos ca. 1911

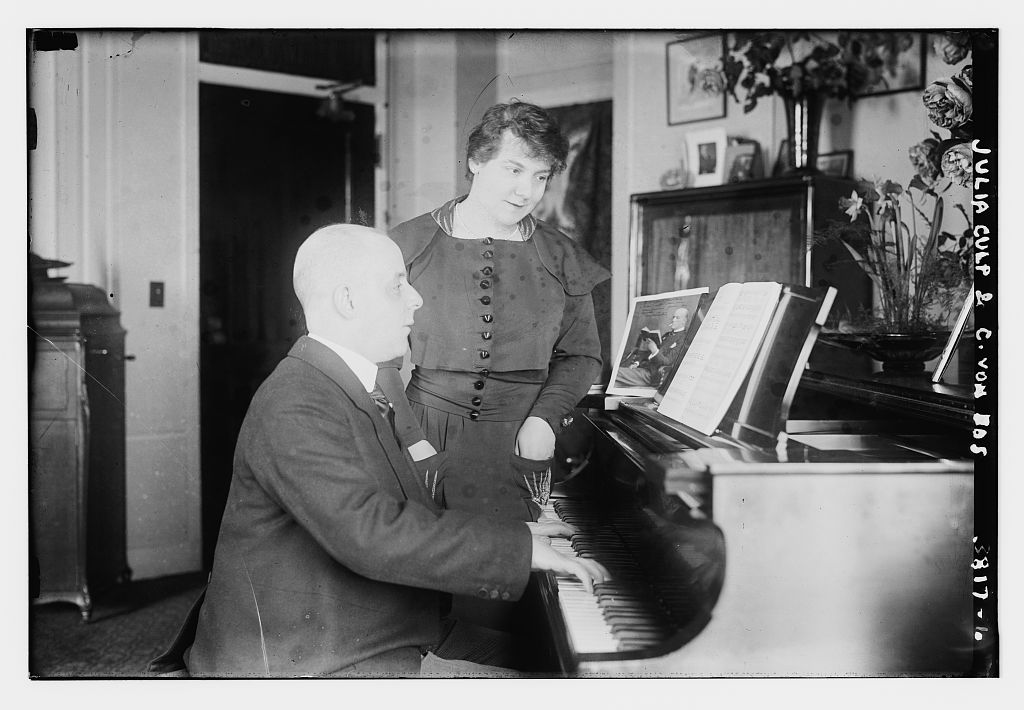
Julia Culp and Coenraad V. Bos, circa 1915

Coenraad Valentijn Bos (7 December 1875 – 5 August 1955) was a Dutch pianist, most notably as an accompanist to singers of lieder. His peers such as Gerald Moore considered him the doyen of accompanists in his day.

== Life ==
He was born in Leiden in 1875. He studied under Julius Röntgen and at the Berlin High School for Music. He decided early to become an accompanist, a field of which he made a special study.

On 9 November 1896, in the presence of the composer, and still a month shy of his 21st birthday, he accompanied the Dutch baritone Anton Sistermans at the premiere of Brahms' Vier ernste Gesänge in Vienna.

In 1899 he founded The Dutch Trio (Das Holländische Trio) together with his Berlin-based countrymen Jacques van Lier and Joseph Maurits van Veen. The pianotrio was active for over ten years and acquired fame throughout Europe.

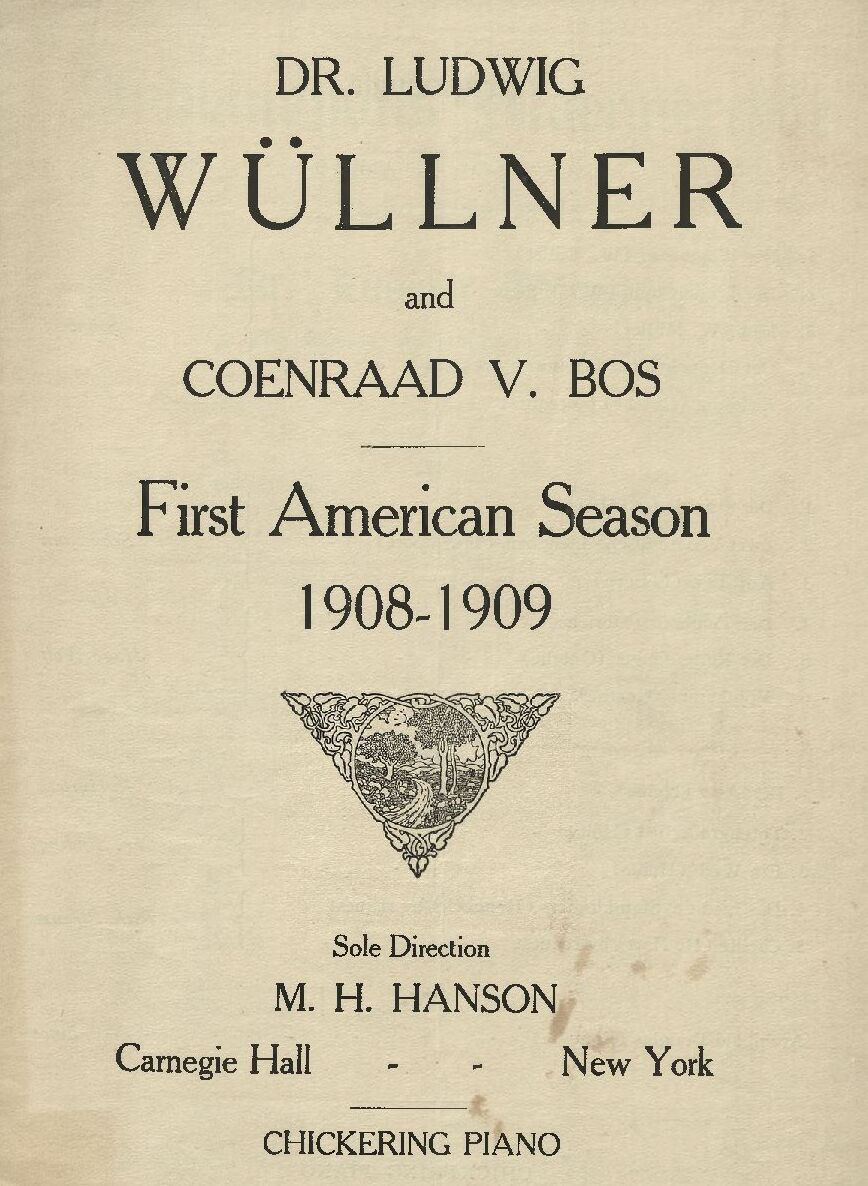
Dr. Ludwig Wüllner and Coenraad V. Bos, March 19, 1909

For many years he worked with singers such as Raimund von zur-Mühlen, Elena Gerhardt (USA tour 1920, Spanish tour 1928), Julia Culp, Frieda Hempel, Alexander Kipnis, Gervase Elwes, Ludwig Wüllner and Helen Traubel (he accompanied Traubel on a world tour in 1945–46).

He appeared with the 13-year-old Yehudi Menuhin in Berlin on 23 April 1929, and they exchanged inscribed photographs of themselves in commemoration of the event (Bos's gift to Menuhin is now in the Museum of the Royal Academy of Music).

He recorded lieder of Brahms, Reger, Schubert, Schumann and Wolf with Elena Gerhardt (1927–32). He figures prominently in the Hugo Wolf Society's Complete Edition 1931–38, accompanying Gerhardt, Herbert Janssen, Gerhard Hüsch, Alexandra Trianti, Elisabeth Rethberg, and Alexander Kipnis.

Bos taught on the faculties of the Cincinnati Conservatory of Music and the Juilliard School. One of his pupils was the soprano Jane Stuart Smith.

He died in Chappaqua, New York, United States on 5 August 1955, aged 79.

== Legacy ==
He preserved his musical memories in "The Well-tempered Accompanist" (1949; co-written with Ashley Pettis).
