= Mansa Assembly constituency =

Mansa Assembly constituency may refer to these electoral constituencies in India:

- Mansa, Gujarat Assembly constituency
- Mansa, Punjab Assembly constituency

== See also ==
- Mansa (disambiguation)
