= Pilar Mañas Brugat =

Spanish military officer (born 1975)

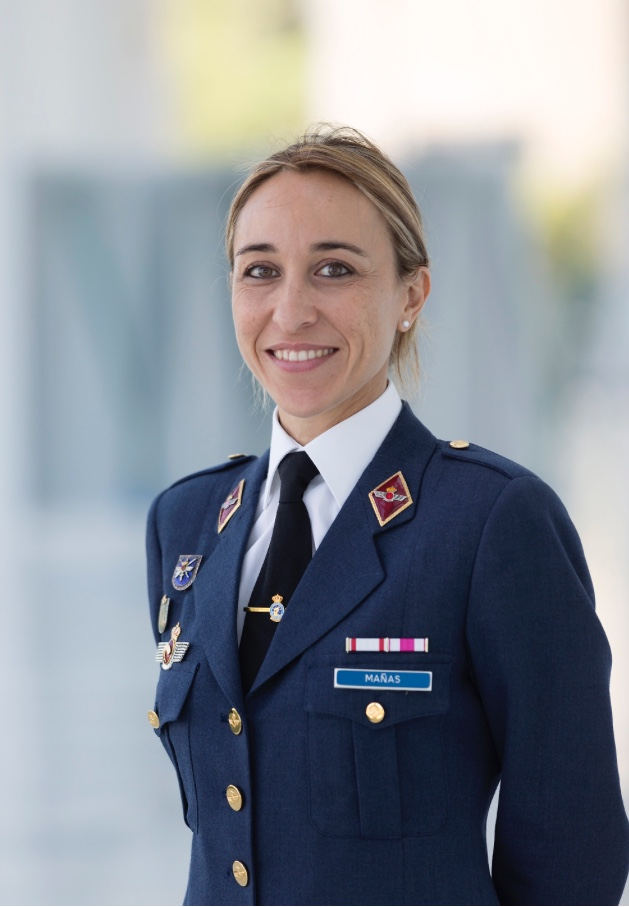
- Taking command in August 2017
- Born: María del Pilar Mañas Brugat; 24 July 1975 (age 50); Zaragoza, Spain
- Allegiance: Spain
- Branch: Spanish Air Force
- Service years: 1998–present
- Rank: Comandante
- Commands: ECAO Madrid

María del Pilar Mañas Brugat (born 24 July 1975) is a Spanish military officer. In 2017 she became the first woman to take command of a Spanish Air Force unit. She was named an Exemplary Woman (Spanish: Mujer Referente) by the Women's Institute in 2018. In 2022 she was awarded the Operation Balmis Commemorative Medal.

In 2020 she was awarded the Commander of the Royal and Military Order of Saint Hermenegild and in 2026 the Commander with Star (Placa) of Order of Saint Hermenegild.

== Biography ==
Pilar Mañas Brugat was born into an Aragonese family with a strong military tradition – her maternal great-grandfather was an officer of the Civil Guard, and two of her great-uncles participated in the Alhucemas landing. Mañas has said that a martial atmosphere was instilled in her home "since we were little, through the photos, the military books, and the uniforms that were in the house."

She trained in Murcia and has developed her professional career in Madrid, but has always maintained a strong link with her homeland, Aragon.

Her sister, Teresa de Jesús Mañas Brugat, is a career officer of the Spanish Army, a Captain of Regulares Group No. 52 of the Comandancia General de Melilla, and later Infantry Captain of the Army assigned to Regimiento Acorazado Pavía, part of Brigada Aragón I in Zaragoza. The Mañas Brugat sisters have blazed a path as women, each through her own career.

== Career ==
Mañas is an air traffic and interception controller. She was trained at the General Air Academy in San Javier, Murcia in the mid-1990s. After intensive preparation for the exam, she joined the Academy in September 1995 and finished in July 1998 as an Air Traffic Control Officer, Operational Air Traffic (CAO) Specialty, including airfield, approach, and area, as well as Interception Control. Upon completion, her first assignment was as Head of Operations and Instruction in the Operational Air Traffic Squadron (ECAO Madrid) in the municipality of Torrejón de Ardoz, a post she held from 1998 to 2003.Operational Air Circulation Squadrons are the instrument that allows the safe and fluid shared use of airspace for both General and Operational Air Circulation aircraft.

From 2003 to 2013, she was assigned to the Air Search and Rescue Service (SAR), also at Torrejón Air Base. She was the SAR Mission and Operations Coordinator, assuming responsibilities such as guiding aerial searches, rescuing damaged aircraft, and saving lives. At this point she was promoted to captain. After a decade of service in the SAR, Mañas was assigned to Air Force Mixed Group 47 in November 2013, again at Torrejón. She held specific Intelligence functions between 2013 and 2017 as part of the Exploitation Squadron and Head of IKM (Information and Knowledge Management).

Mañas is an expert in Tactical Leadership Programme-Electronic Warfare Course (EWC) since 2014, NATO CASPOA Q1 "Air Battle Training Course" (Lyon, France) since 2015 and Protocol, Ceremonial and Organisation of Events in the Royal Guard since 2016. Since 2010, she has participated as a member of the Selection Board for the Selection Processes of Officers for admission to the Academies and she is a member of the Evaluation Boards for the promotion of officers to higher employment.

After a 20-year career, she was promoted to Comandante (equivalent to major) and was commissioned to direct ECAO Madrid, thus returning to her first posting. On 2 August 2017, she became the first woman to take command of a unit in the Spanish Air Force. She took command of the headquarters of ECAO Madrid at a ceremony held at Torrejón Air Base. The ceremony was chaired by General Rafael García Hernández, Chief of the Command and Control System, and attended by military and civil authorities, including the heads of the units located at the base and the director of the Central-North Region of ENAIRE. This historical event was picked up in the media and social networks, receiving congratulations from, among other people and institutions, the Minister of Defense, María Dolores de Cospedal.

As head of the unit, Mañas leads a team of 35 people who control one of the four zones into which Spanish airspace is divided, in a coordinated manner with civilian controllers, to ensure that state aircraft make their journeys without incident and arrive at their destinations in the shortest possible time. She is in charge of "exercising control of operational aerial traffic and coordinating the shared use of airspace in conditions of safety and fluidity between military and civil air traffic." This includes aircraft that transport members of the royal family and government, as well as those used in air evacuation, transfers to areas of operation and repatriation, and delivering humanitarian aid.

I confess myself fortunate and proud to return to the place where I started my professional career. I feel that I have the obligation to give everything that I am personally and professionally able to carry out my mandate, and get the unit to maintain the prestige and professionalism that characterizes it.

— Pilar Mañas Brugat

The military magazine Ejércitos concluded that this was "news to be congratulated. [...] Step by step, equality is becoming the new norm for our Armed Forces."

In continuous training, Mañas specialised in 2019 in the Promotion of Women's Leadership in the FAS, through the Permanent Secretary for Equality, in 2020 in Equality Policy in the Armed Forces, at the Ministry of Defence. And in 2022 she completed the United Nations Military Gender Advisor Course from MGA Training, Australia. She also obtained a TRM Facilitator qualification from ENAIRE and a Private Pilot Licence from the Flyschool Air Academy.

In February 2020, she was one of the key players in the positive resolution of the incident involving an Air Canada plane that had to fly over Madrid for hours before making a forced landing. This achievement, coordinated with other experts and a large team, could be made public and was reported in an article "Incidente Aéreo Air Canada" in the Aeronautics and Astronautics Magazine of Spain (in Spanish Revista de Aeronáutica y Astronáutica) published in May 2020.

In August 2020, she was assigned to the Office of the Chief of Staff of the Air Force (JEMA), as Head of Institutional Relations and Protocol, Head of Communication and website as well as assistant to the JEMA occasionally. This was an institutional rol. That year she was also one of the people chosen in the I Applaud You project (in Spanish proyecto Yo te aplaudo) for her contribution to overcoming COVID-19 during the pandemic. In 2021, on the occasion of the Military parade on 12 October in Madrid, Mañas was the military expert on the Spanish public television team broadcasting the event. It was offered by Spanish channels through La 1, Canal 24 Horas, TVE Internacional and RTVE Play.

== Recognitions ==
Among the awards recognising her career:

- 2021. Best Manager of the Year Award from the Spanish Association of Women Entrepreneurs (ASEME)
- 2018. 'Inspiring Woman Award' (in Spanish 'Premio Mujer Inspiradora') at the Inspiring Girls Awards
- 2018: Named an Exemplary Woman by the Women's Institute
- 2018: Madrid Third Millennium Forum (FMTM) Woman of the Year

== Military awards ==
Mañas military awards:

- 2026. Commander with Star (Placa) of the Royal and Military Order of Saint Hermenegild
- 2022. Operation Balmis Commemorative Medal
- 2020. Commander of the Royal and Military Order of Saint Hermenegild
- 2015. Cross of the Royal and Military Order of Saint Hermenegild
- 2004. Cross of Aeronautical Merit, white badge
- 2002. Spanish Military Honourable Mention

== Community engagement ==
Comandante Mañas participates in events aimed at developing vocation in girls and boys so that they can dedicate themselves to what they are passionate about when they grow up. Among other groups, she has collaborated with Inspiring Girls in Spain to motivate the women of the future in events together with women such as the Olympic athlete Carlota Castrejana, as well as with Raquel Sáez, Gloria Ortega, Victoria Alejandre, Verónica Fernández, and Eire García on the project "Break Stereotypes in Schools" that culminated with an audiovisual presentation describing the experience.

In 2018, she was named an Exemplary Woman (Spanish: Mujer Referente) by the Spanish Government's Institute of Women and Equal Opportunities in the first edition of these awards, and Woman of the Year by the Madrid Third Millennium Forum (FMTM). She continues to give talks about the importance of the presence of women in the Army. She also collaborates with the National Association of Women Entrepreneurs, Managers and Executives (ANAEDE) and continues to give talks on the importance of the presence of women in the military.
