= Bina Addy =

Indian Bengali singer (1894–1962)

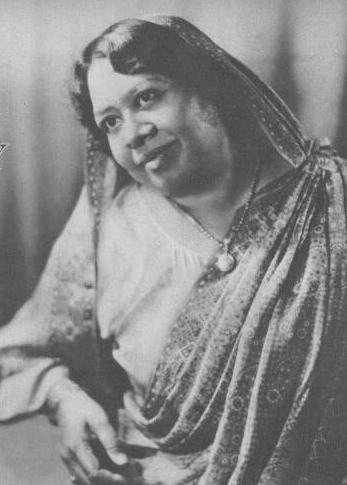
- Bina Addy, from a 1937 Australian magazine.
- Born: Calcutta
- Died: 1962
- Other name: Bini Addy
- Occupation: Singer

Bina Addy (13 Jan 1894 – 1962), also seen as Bini Addy, was an Indian singer of popular Bengali and Western songs.

== Early life ==
Bina Addy was from Calcutta, from a Bengali Christian family; two of her brothers became college professors. Her voice first attracted notice in a church choir in Calcutta. She studied music in Europe after 1928, with Elena Gerhardt in Leipzig and Mario Cotogni in Rome.

== Career ==
Addy was considered a mezzo-soprano or contralto singer. She was promoted as the first Indian woman to study Western music in Europe, and the first to become a professional singer touring internationally. She performed on BBC radio broadcasts between 1929 and 1932. In 1931, the League of Nations Union in Croydon held a reception for Addy, where she performed.

Addy sang in concerts, on radio, and at benefits for the YWCA and other organizations, in Australia and New Zealand in the 1930s. She was involved in the centenary celebrations in South Australia in 1936. Her programs were mainly Bengali songs, including works by Rabindranath Tagore, but she sometimes included British folk songs, African-American spirituals, Italian arias, and German lieder. She also gave short talks during her programs, about Gandhi, Tagore, and other Indian topics. She was often accompanied by women musicians. "Her technique is assured and well-founded, and with this she associates an impressive sense of style," noted one Australian critic in 1937.

"It is my sincere desire to create a better understanding between my country and other nations," she told an interviewer in 1937, "and if I could feel that I had in any way provided a link between the East and the West, I should be content."
