= Manasu =

Manasu may refer to:

== Films ==
- Guppeddu Manasu, a 1979 Telugu film directed by K. Balachander.
- Manasu, a 2000 Tamil film directed by Abdul Rahman.
- Manasu Maata Vinadhu, a 2005 Telugu film directed by V.N. Aditya.
- Manasu Palike Mouna Raagam, a 2006 Telugu film starring Sneha and Vikramaditya.
- Manasu Rendum Pudhusu, a 1994 Tamil film starring Jayaram and Kushboo.
- Manchi Manasulu, a 1962 Telugu film directed by Adurthi Subba Rao.
- Manchi Manasuku Manchi Rojulu, a 1958 Telugu film directed by C. S. Rao.
- Moggina Manasu, a 2008 Kannada film directed by Shashank.
- Mooga Manasulu, a 1963 Telugu film directed by Adurthi Subba Rao.
- Tene Manasulu, a 1965 Telugu film starring Krishna.
- Thaai Manasu, a 1994 Tamil film directed by Kasthuri Raja.

== Places ==
- Mañasu (Bolivia), a mountain in Bolivia

== See also ==
- Manas (disambiguation)
- Thene Manasu (disambiguation)
