= Edith Schaeffer =

American author

- Born: Edith Rachel Merritt Seville; November 3, 1914; Wenzhou, China
- Died: March 30, 2013 (aged 98); Gryon, Switzerland
- Spouse: Francis Schaeffer
- Children: Priscilla, Susan, Deborah, Frank

Edith Rachel Merritt Schaeffer (née Seville; November 3, 1914 – March 30, 2013) was a Christian author and co-founder of L'Abri, a Christian organization which hosts guests. She was the wife of Francis Schaeffer, and the mother of Frank Schaeffer and three other children.

== Early life ==
Schaeffer was born in Wenzhou, China, the fourth child of George and Jessie Seville, missionaries who were serving in China with the China Inland Mission. In addition to her English name, her parents gave her the Chinese name Mei Fuh, meaning "beautiful happiness".

Schaeffer attended Beaver College in Glenside, Pennsylvania. It was there that she met Francis Schaeffer and they were married in 1935. They had four children: Priscilla, Susan, Deborah and Frank.

== L'Abri ==
They were sent in 1948 to Switzerland by the Independent Board for Presbyterian Foreign Missions. In 1955 they began L'Abri, a community that welcomed people who were seeking intellectually honest and culturally informed answers to questions about God and the meaning of life.

Schaeffer's husband Francis died in 1984, but she continued to be associated with the L'Abri organisation which she and her husband founded.

Schaeffer wrote numerous books, both before and after the death of her husband. Her book Affliction (1978) explores human suffering in a Christian context. It won a Gold Medallion Award from the Evangelical Christian Publishers Association (ECPA) in 1979. Her What is a Family? (1975) compared the extended family to a mobile. Her autobiographical The Tapestry: the Life and Times of Francis and Edith Schaeffer (1981) won the ECPA award in 1982.

Schaeffer's The Hidden Art of Homemaking (1971) has been influential among women in the Christian Patriarchy movement, and has been described by Kathryn Joyce as "perhaps unintentionally, a landmark book for proponents of biblical womanhood." This book, along with What is a Family?, has been described by author Becky Freeman Johnson as a "timeless classic".

In 2000, Schaeffer was listed in Helen Kooiman Hosier's 100 Christian Women Who Changed the Twentieth Century.

== Death ==
At the age of 98, Schaeffer died on March 30, 2013, at home in Gryon, Switzerland.

== Works ==
- Schaeffer, Edith;. 1969. L'Abri. Worthing (Sussex): Norfolk P. ISBN 978-1-85684-025-5
- Schaeffer, Edith; 1971. The Hidden Art of Homemaking: Creative Ideas for Enriching Everyday Life. Wheaton, IL: Tyndale House. ISBN 978-0-8423-1420-6
- Schaeffer, Francis A., and Edith; 1973. Everybody Can Know. London: Scripture Union. ISBN 978-0-85421-405-1
- Schaeffer, Edith; 1978. Affliction. Old Toppen, New Jersey: Revell Co. ISBN 978-0-8007-0926-6
- Schaeffer, Edith; 1975. Christianity is Jewish. Wheaton, IL: Tyndale House Publishers. ISBN 978-0-8423-0243-2
- Schaeffer, Edith; 1975. What is a Family? Old Tappan, N.J.: F.H. Revell Co. ISBN 978-0-8010-8365-5
- Schaeffer, Edith. 1977. A Way of Seeing. Old Tappan, N.J.: Revell. ISBN 978-0-8007-0871-9
- Schaeffer, Edith. 1981. The Tapestry: the life and times of Francis and Edith Schaeffer. Waco, Tex: Word Books. ISBN 978-0-8499-0284-0
- Schaeffer, Edith. 1983. Common Sense Christian Living. Nashville: Nelson. ISBN 978-0-8407-5280-2
- Schaeffer, Edith. 1983. Lifelines: God's Framework for Christian Living. Westchester, IL: Crossway Books. ISBN 978-0-89107-228-7
- Schaeffer, Edith. 1986. Forever Music. Nashville: T. Nelson. ISBN 978-0-8010-8336-5
- Schaeffer, Edith, and Louis Gifford Parkhurst (ed.). 1987. The Art of Life. Westchester, IL: Crossway Books. ISBN 978-0-89107-455-7
- Schaeffer, Edith. 1988. With love, Edith: the L'Abri family letters 1948-1960. San Francisco: Harper & Row. ISBN 978-0-06-067092-4
- Schaeffer, Edith. 1989. Dear Family: the L'Abri family letters 1961-1986. San Francisco: Harper & Row. ISBN 978-0-06-067096-2
- Schaeffer, Edith. 1992. The Life of Prayer. Wheaton, IL: Crossway Books. ISBN 978-1-85684-046-0
- Mohr, Franz, and Edith Schaeffer. 1992. My Life With the Great Pianists. Grand Rapids, Mich: Baker Book House. ISBN 978-0-8010-6296-4
- Schaeffer, Edith. 1994. A Celebration of Marriage: Hopes and Realities. Grand Rapids, Mich: Baker Books. ISBN 978-0-8010-8354-9
- Schaeffer, Edith. 1994. 10 Things Parents Must Teach Their Children (And Learn for Themselves) Grand Rapids, Mich: Baker Books. ISBN 978-0-8010-8373-0
- Schaeffer, Edith. 1998. Mei Fuh: Memories from China. Boston: Houghton Mifflin Co. ISBN 978-0-395-72290-9
- Schaeffer, Edith. 2000. A Celebration of Children. Grand Rapids, MI: Raven Ridge Books. ISBN 978-0-8010-1193-1
