= L'Abri =

Evangelical Christian organisation

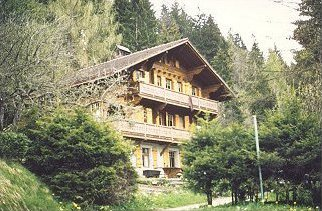
Chalet Les Melezes at Swiss L'Abri

L'Abri (French for "the shelter") is an evangelical Christian organisation which was founded on June 5, 1955 by Francis Schaeffer and his wife Edith in Huémoz-sur-Ollon, Switzerland. They opened their alpine home as a ministry to curious travelers and as a forum to discuss philosophical and religious beliefs. Today, L'Abri houses in various parts of the world continue to offer people a place to stay when they travel.

== Development of L'Abri ==
In 1947 Francis and Edith moved to Switzerland to work as missionaries for the Independent Board for Presbyterian Foreign Missions (IBPFM) in Europe. Following a spiritual crisis in 1951, and disagreements with theologians such as Carl McIntire, Schaeffer and his wife left IBPFM in 1955, to pursue their dream of working with young people. They moved to Huémoz where they would establish L'Abri. Word of mouth soon led to an increasing stream of visitors, with one period in the summer of 1956 averaging 31 visitors per week. International distribution of tapes of Schaeffer's lectures also helped to raise awareness of Schaeffer's work. The operatic soprano Jane Stuart Smith was one of the visitors to L'Abri in 1956, and she became a born again Christian as a result of that experience. She later abandoned her opera career, and joined the staff at Huémoz where she was a prominent member of the community until her retirement.

L'Abri would come to own and operate several buildings in Huémoz. It came to include four kinds of people: short-term guests; students, who divided their time between study and communal work; workers, who participated in discussions and the work of hospitality; and members, who were part of the decision-making process. During the Fourth Great Awakening many Americans came to L'Abri including Stephen Crotts, who took the teachings and influences taught there back to the United States.

Following Schaeffer's death in 1984, L'Abri would continue to grow. In the present day, L'Abri has operations in a number of different countries. As of 2011, L'Abri has residential "Study Centres" in the United States (Minnesota and Massachusetts), Canada, South Korea, Australia, the United Kingdom, the Netherlands, Sweden, and Switzerland. It also has non-residential "Resource Centres", run by friends of the organization in Brazil and Germany.

== Mode of operation ==
Visitors to L'Abri Centres are referred to as students, and personal study remains central to L'Abri's work, but there are no fixed "classes" or courses. Rather students (who may spend any time from one day to a whole "term," usually two–three months, at L'Abri) meet regularly with a member of staff to discuss the issues they wish to study, and are recommended resources from L'Abri's library of books, recorded lectures, and talks by L'Abri staff and others. A student's day is divided into "study time" and "work time." During "work time," a student will help with the necessary activities of the community – cooking meals, cleaning, maintenance etc. This division is based on Schaeffer's constant emphasis that Christianity, and the work of L'Abri, were not only intellectual but had to incorporate all of life, and that a demonstration of "Christian Community" was as central to L'Abri's work as the intellectual demonstration that he believed could be made of the reasonableness and truthfulness of Christian belief. The L'Abri day revolves around communal meals, often used as an opportunity for formal open discussion, and students are encouraged to pursue interests in art, music and literature.

In a 2008 article on the group, Molly Worthen suggested that students then came with very different questions, and that they tended to look at the politicized evangelical faith that Schaeffer helped create with suspicion.

Apart from Francis and Edith Schaeffer and their children, several notable Evangelical authors have been influenced by working with L'Abri. Such former staff include Os Guinness, Hans Rookmaaker, Greg Laughery, and Wade Bradshaw.

The L'Abri study center in Rochester, Minnesota also organizes bi-annual "L'Abri Conferences" in the USA and Canada at which L'Abri staff from across the world and other speakers supportive of the vision of L'Abri speak and lead seminars on a wide range of topics. In 2005, a conference was held in St. Louis, Missouri to celebrate the 50th anniversary of the organization, and over 1,000 attendees were present to hear speakers such as Os Guinness, Harold O. J. Brown, and Chuck Colson.
