= Harry Been =

Dutch businessman (born 1949)

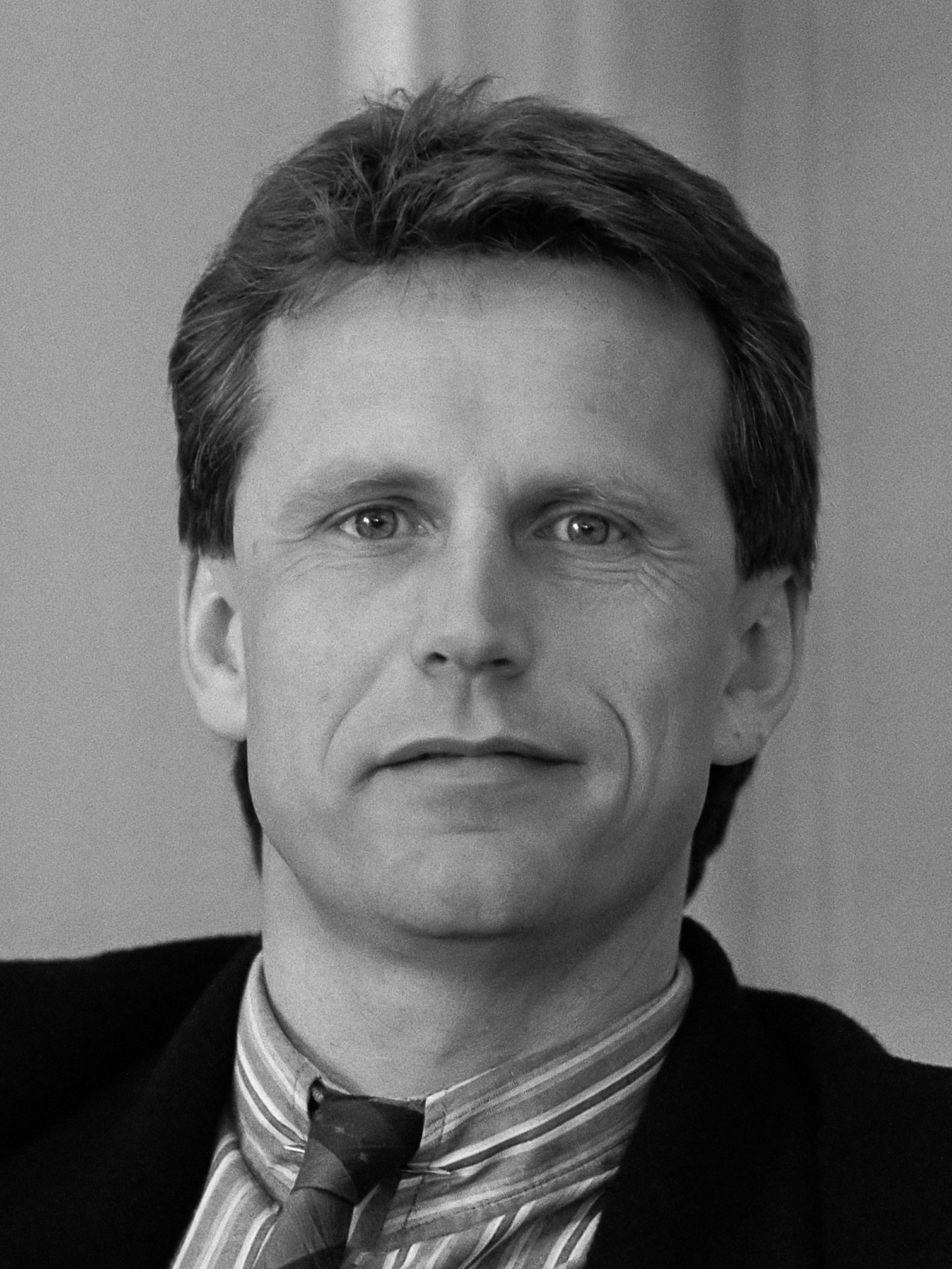
Harry Been (1989)

Harry Been (born 23 January 1949) is a Dutch businessman who presided over the organizing committees of Euro 2000, the 2005 FIFA World Youth Championship, and the 2007 UEFA European Under-21 Football Championship. He was head of the joint Netherlands and Belgium bid to host the 2018 World Cup.

== Life and career ==
Been studied social sciences and planning at the University of Groningen. He was the municipal secretary of the municipality of Zwolle. He was particularly known as director of a number of major football tournaments, Euro 2000 (together with Belgium), the World Cup under 20 of 2005 and the European Championships under 21 of 2007. In addition, he was ultimately responsible for the European finals.

Harry Been became director at the NOC*NSF in 2012. He is a president commissioner of Sportstad Heerenveen, member of the UEFA's organizational committee of the European Championships for country teams. He is also a member of the organizational committee of the FIFA World Championships. Both for UEFA and FIFA, he is an official observer at international football matches and tournaments.

In 2010, he received the Sport Know How Award. In 2013 he received de Frenckell Medal for "Serving The Game in A Remarkable Way" in Helsinki.

Harry Been is also known for his controversial decision to ask the continuation of the UEFA 2016 game between Serbia and Albania, after hooligan fans entered the pitch and physically attacked Albanian players.
