= Manas (given name) =

Manas is an Indian given name. Notable people with the surname include:

- Manas Bhunia, Indian politician
- Manas Bihari Verma, Indian aeronautical scientist (1943–2021)
- Manas Kumar Mandal, is a scientist and psychologist of Delhi, India
- Manas Mukherjee, Bengali music director
- Manas Das, Indian footballer
- Manas Chaudhuri, Indian politician
- Manas Chakraborty, Musical artist
- Manas Robin, Indian singer, composer and lyricst

== See also ==
- Manash Deka, Indian Politician and Social Worker
