= Jacques van Lier =

Dutch cellist

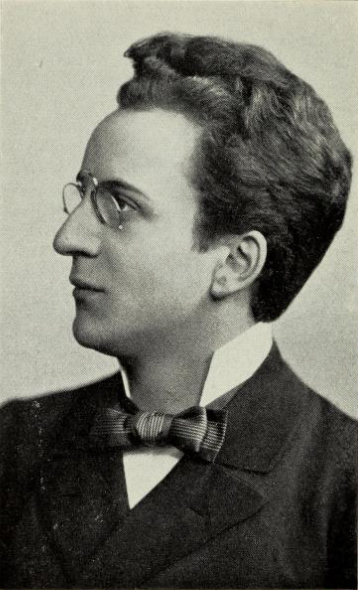

Background information
- Born: 24 April 1875; The Hague, Netherlands
- Died: 25 February 1951 (aged 75) Angmering, Sussex
- Genre: Classical music
- Instrument: Cello
- Years active: 1886–1939
- Label: Vocalion Records

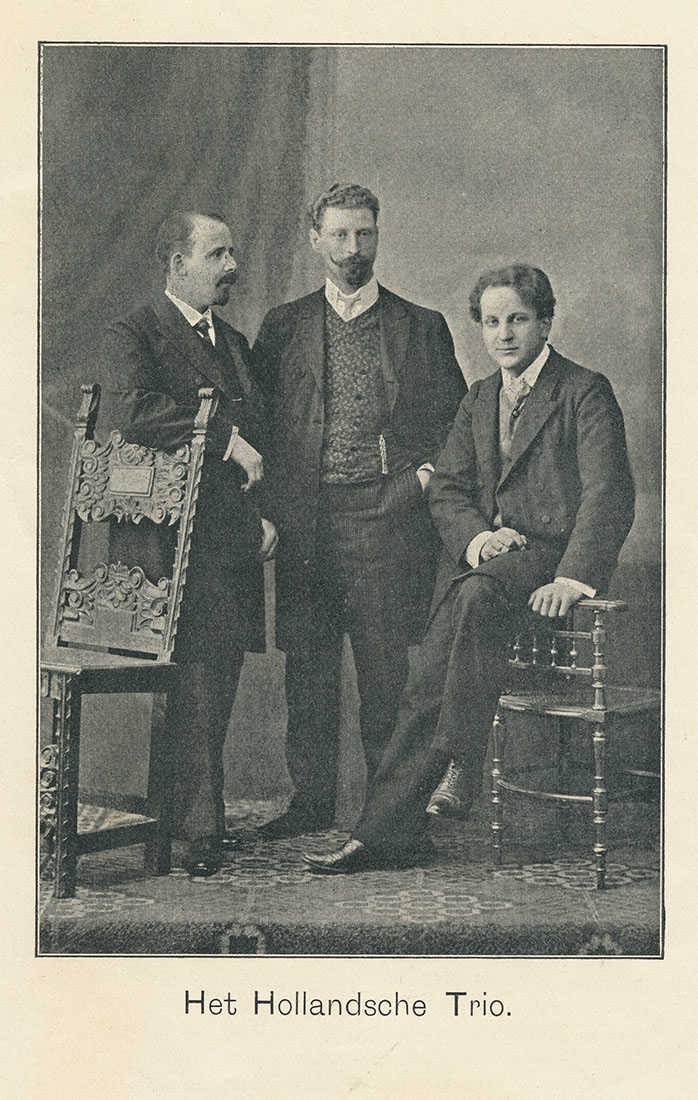
The Dutch Trio in Berlin, 1906: Coenraad V. Bos, Jos. van Veen and Jacques van Lier

Jacques van Lier (24 April 1875 – 25 February 1951) was a Dutch-British cellist who spent most of his career in Germany and England. He played with the best musicians of his time and was well regarded as a teacher. He published many arrangements for cello.

== Life ==
=== Early years ===
Jacques was the third of nine children and the eldest son of tailor Felix van Lier and Naatje Frank. His father was secretary and treasurer of the men's choir Attentia in The Hague. He provided his children with a musical education at an early age. Jacques studied with Joseph Giese at the Koninklijke Muziekschool and started to perform for audiences from the age of seven during presentations of his father's choir.

At 13 years of age, van Lier moved to Rotterdam to study with Oscar Eberlé at the precursor of the Rotterdam Conservatory. Between 1891 and 1895, he played regularly, including solo, in the orchestra of the Paleis voor Volksvlijt in Amsterdam conducted by Richard Hol. Van Lier was only 16 years of age when he was appointed to the Sinfonieorchester Basel. In 1893, van Lier became its solo-cellist. He returned to the Netherlands in 1896 as an international cellist. In July of that year, he obtained the position of second cellist of the Berliner Philharmonic, which spent the summer season in the Kurhaus. One month later, 17-year-old Lina Coen, a French pianist of Dutch descent, made her debut there as solo pianist accompanied by the same orchestra. One year later, van Lier and Coen announced their engagement in Berlin.

=== Berlin ===
The young couple had moved to Berlin in the fall of 1896 for the winter season of the Berliner Philharmonic. On one occasion, in early 1897, the solo cellist Simon van Beuge became indisposed and van Lier had to take over on the spot. The audience was impressed by his performance of Benjamin Godard's Berceuse de Jocelyn and requested an encore. Soon thereafter, van Lier obtained the position of solo-cellist.

Van Lier and Coen married in 1899. They had a daughter, Felicia "Sousie" van Lier, born in Berlin in 1901. The marriage was short-lived and was dissolved in 1907. Van Lier and Coen both stayed in Berlin until the start of World War I.

Van Lier was a cellist at the Berlin Philharmonic between 1896 and 1898. He left the orchestra to dedicate himself to teaching, arranging compositions for cello and playing chamber music. He took a position as teacher at the Klindworth-Scharwenka-conservatorium where he stayed until 1914. In 1899, van Lier joined Coenraad Valentijn Bos and Joseph van Veen to start a pianotrio named "The Dutch Trio" which became famous throughout Europe and was active until 1910.

In 1905 Van Lier gave a concert with the young pianist Otto Klemperer. The two travelled on three occasions to Vienna in 1907 for a series of very successful presentations.

=== London ===
In August 1914, at the start of World War I, Van Lier left Berlin in the company of his ex-wife and their daughter and moved to Eastbourne, England, where his brother Simon van Lier directed the Grand Hotel Orchestra, in which Simon's wife Flora Manheim played the violin. In the fall of 1914 they sometimes performed in front of the Eastbourne railway station to raise funds for the Red Cross. Simon and Flora had a daughter also named Felicia, which explains the need for the nicknames of Fifi and Sousie for the two namesake cousins. Also Van Lier's brother Louis and his sister Regina lived in England. Lina Coen travelled on to settle in New York City and Jacques van Lier settled in London with his daughter where he became known as "the cellist of continental fame". He premiered the Cello Concerto of his friend John David Davis in Bournemouth in 1921. A London performance followed in 1924. He played regularly for BBC radio. At The Proms in September 1923, van Lier played as solo-cellist the Cello Concert No. 1 by Camille Saint-Saëns with the New Queen´s Hall Orchestra.

Felicia "Sousie" van Lier was a soprano and in 1930, gave a concert in the Diligentia Theatre in the Hague, accompanied by pianist Siegfried Blaauw who had worked with Van Lier in Berlin. Her singing career was cut short when in 1932, she moved to the United States, where she married and had three children.

In 1937, van Lier obtained British nationality. Four of his sisters who stayed in the Netherlands, together with their spouses, children and grandchildren, fell victim to the Holocaust, as did Flora Manheim and Felicia "Fifi" Wolff-van Lier. In addition, many of van Lier's colleagues, such as Joseph van Veen and Siegfried Blaauw, became Holocaust victims. Jacques van Lier died in 1951 in Angmering, Sussex.

== Works ==
=== Publications ===
Handbook for cellotechnique Violoncell- Bogentechnik.

=== Recordings ===
The Recorded Cello vol II contains a recording of a Minuet by Gluck performed by van Lier in 1921.

Vocalion Records published in 1926 a record with Jacques van Lier and announced him as "the Paganini of cellists".

Teledisk published in its A-series, made for the Anglo-International Concert Direction, two recordings by Van Lier:

- A-2880: Allegro (Valentini), with piano accompaniment by Enid Brook
- A-3102: Dido´s Lament (Purcell), by Elena Liarosa with Enid Brook on piano and Jacques van Lier on cello.

=== Arrangements ===
Van Lier was a collector of compositions for cello by old masters, almost-forgotten composers and contemporary musicians. He arranged hundreds of works, many of which were published. His arrangements, especially of 17th and 18th-century works, earned van Lier a lasting place in music history.

Two examples of arrangements of works by almost-forgotten composers are the pieces on the 1926 Vocalion record, namely Florembassi´s Arlequin Triste and Mazzano´s Arioso from 1730. In the series Klassische Meisterwerke (N. Simrock G.m.b.H., Berlin and Leipzig 1914) van Lier published arrangements of works by Francesco Cupis de Camargo, Jean-Marie Leclair, Pietro Nardini, Pierre Gaviniès, François Chabran, Emanuele Barbella, Francesco Geminiani, Exaudet, Desplanes and Vivaldi.

Stücke Alter Meister (Schlesinger, Berlijn 1906) consists of two Menuets by Mozart and one by Händel, together with "La complaisante" by C. Bach, Le Bavolet Flottant by François Couperin, a Gavotte by Jean-Philippe Rameau and one by Padre Martini, arranged by van Lier and Willy Burmester. With the same title and the same editor, a collection of 42 arrangements by van Lier appeared in 1913, some of which had already been published by 1906. Van Lier´s arrangement of a Menuett by Beethoven was broadcast on BBC radio in 1929.

Stimmungsbilder, Opus 9 by Richard Strauss in an arrangement by van Lier, was published in 1903 by Jos. Aibl Verlag and in 1904 by Universal Edition in Vienna. This house also published the pieces by Robert Schumann (Trio I, opus 63 and Trio III, opus 110), Ludwig van Beethoven: 5 Sonatas for cello and piano and Jacques Champion de Chambonniėres Suite pour violoncelle, all with arrangements by van Lier.

=== Dedications ===
Several composers, some of whom were colleagues or students of Van Lier, dedicated works to him as an expression of friendship, gratitude or admiration. Elisabeth Kuyper, who studied and worked in Berlin during the same years as van Lier, dedicated her Ballad Opus 11 to him. Philip Scharwenka, the Director of the conservatory where van Lier worked, dedicated compositions to him: his cello-sonata opus 116 and his string quartet opus 120. Hermann Grädener dedicated his first cello-concert opus 45 to his "good friend Jacques van Lier" and August Nölck honored "Mr. van Lier, with esteem" in his Mazurka concert opus 86. Willem Feltzer dedicated his "two pieces for cello and piano" to his "good friend Jacques van Lier".
