= Mansa Cove =

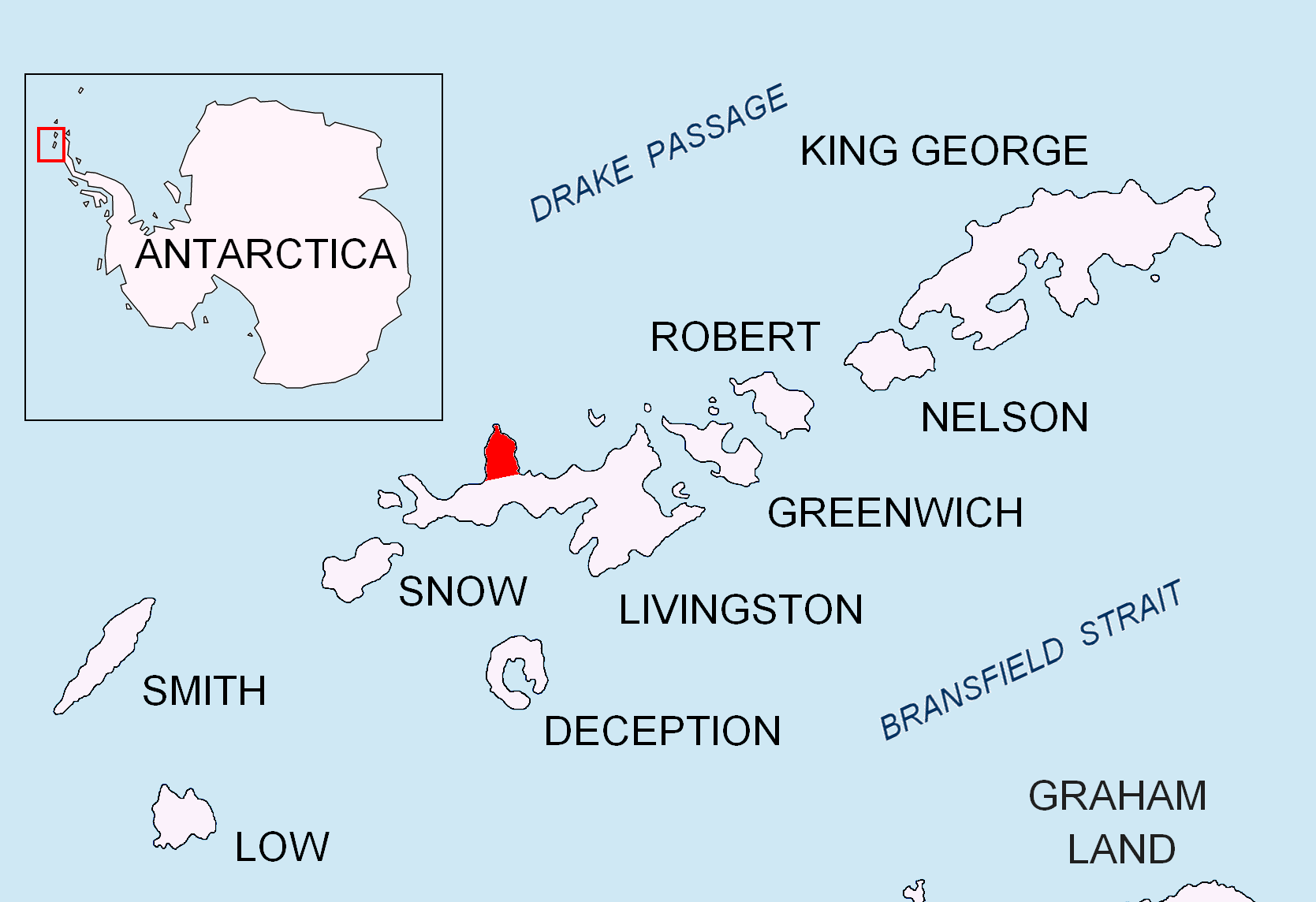
- Location of Ioannes Paulus II Peninsula on Livingston Island in the South Shetland Islands.

- Location of Mansa Cove on the Antarctic Peninsula
- Coordinates: 62.46472°S 60.78472°W
- Type: Cove

Mansa Cove is the 450-metre-wide (1,480 ft) cove indenting for 300 metres (980 ft) the east coast of the small (2.6 by 1.6 kilometres [1.62 mi × 0.99 mi]) ice-free promontory forming the north extremity of Ioannes Paulus II Peninsula, western Livingston Island in the South Shetland Islands, Antarctica and ending up in Cape Shirreff.

The feature was descriptively named by the 1984–85 Chilean Antarctic Expedition from the stillness of its waters (‘Quiet Bay’ in Spanish).

== Location ==
Topographic map of Livingston Island and Smith Island.

The cove is centred at 62°27′53″S 60°47′05″W which is 680 metres (2,230 ft) of Cape Shirreff, 4.26 kilometres (2.65 mi) northwest of Black Point and 1.18 kilometres (0.73 mi) east by north of Rapa Nui Point (British mapping in 1968, detailed Chilean mapping in 2004, and Bulgarian mapping in 2005 and 2009).

== Maps ==
- Map 3. Cape Shirreff, ASPA No. 149: Breeding wildlife sites and human features. Punta Arenas: Instituto Antártico Chileno (INACH), 2004.
- L.L. Ivanov et al. Antarctica: Livingston Island and Greenwich Island, South Shetland Islands. Scale 1:100000 topographic map. Sofia: Antarctic Place-names Commission of Bulgaria, 2005.
- L.L. Ivanov. Antarctica: Livingston Island and Greenwich, Robert, Snow and Smith Islands. Scale 1:120000 topographic map. Troyan: Manfred Wörner Foundation, 2009. ISBN 978-954-92032-6-4
