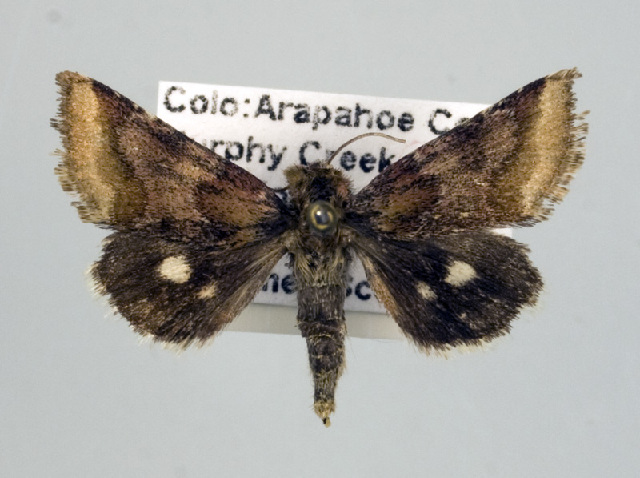

Scientific classification
- Domain: Eukaryota
- Kingdom: Animalia
- Phylum: Arthropoda
- Class: Insecta
- Order: Lepidoptera
- Superfamily: Noctuoidea
- Family: Noctuidae
- Genus: Schinia
- Species: S. bina

Binomial name
- Schinia bina Guenée, 1852

Synonyms
- Schinia meskeana

= Schinia bina =

Species of moth

Schinia bina, the bina flower moth, is a moth of the family Noctuidae. The species was first described by Achille Guenée in 1852. It is found from Mexico City to central Florida, and as far north as Saskatchewan and Manitoba in Canada.

Schinia meskeana is probably a valid species, but remains a synonym until a revision has been published.

The wingspan is about 11 mm. There is one generation per year.

The larvae feed on Verbesina encilioides, Gaillardia pulchella, and hawkweed species.
