= Binah =

Binah may refer to:

- Binah, Togo, a prefecture of Togo
- Binah (Kabbalah), the second intellectual Sephirah on the tree of life in the Kabbalah of Judaism
- Binah (magazine), a Jewish women's weekly magazine published in the United States
- Binah, a character in the World of the Three Moons a fantasy realm that serves as a setting for the Trillium series of novels
- Binah, a character of The English Roses children's book series
- Rachel Binah (born 1942), American environmental and community activist
