= Veena Misra =

Academic electrical engineer

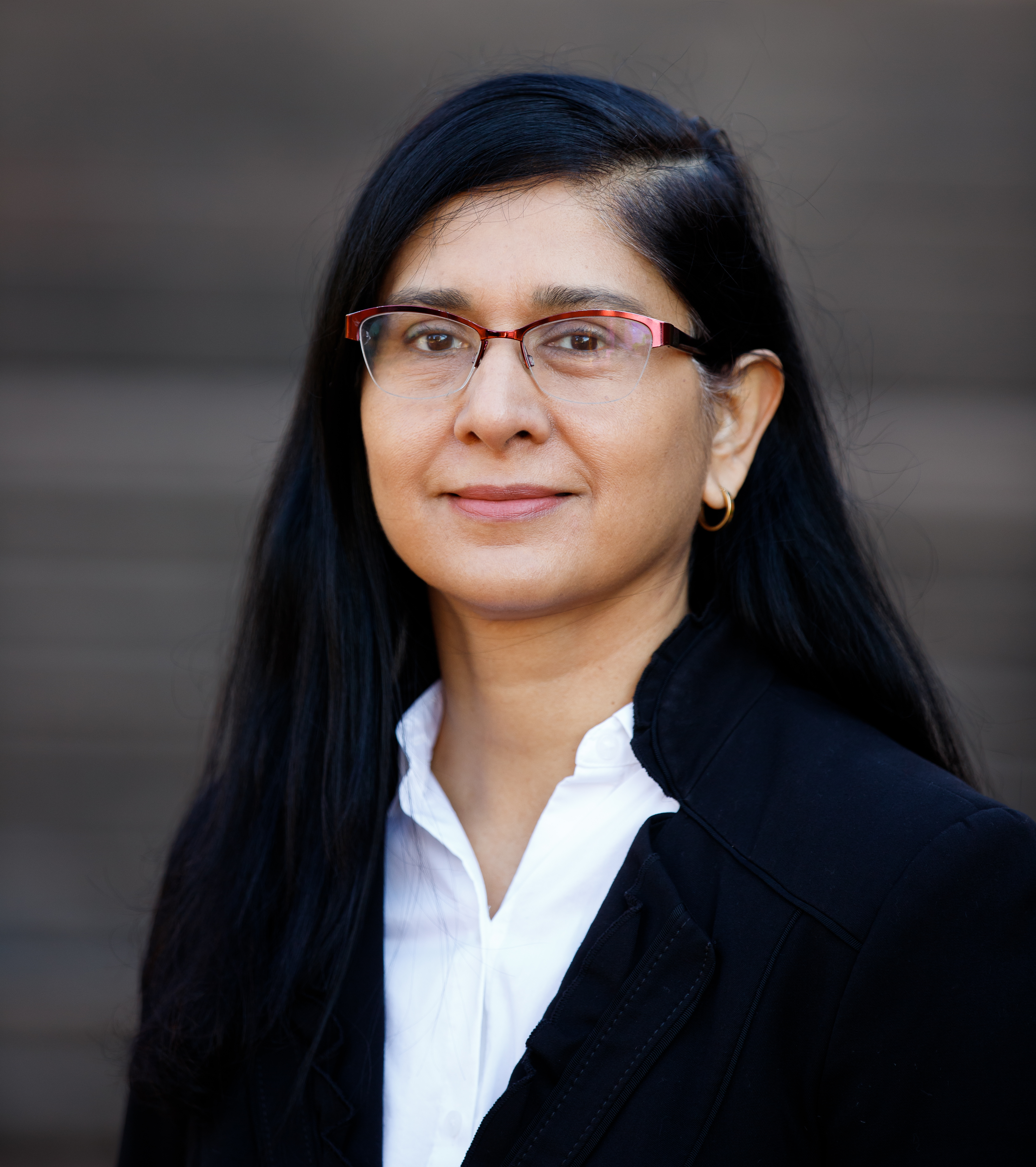
Veena Misra

Veena Misra is an academic electrical engineer whose research has spanned a range of scales from forming individual circuit components out of semiconductors to wearable technology. She is MC Dean Distinguished University Professor at North Carolina State University, and was named head of the university's Department of Electrical and Computer Engineering in 2024.

Misra was an electrical engineering student at North Carolina State University, where she earned a bachelor's degree in 1991, a master's degree in 1992, and a Ph.D. in 1995. She spent three years in industry before returning to NC State as a faculty member in 1998.

Misra was named a Fellow of the Institute of Electrical and Electronics Engineers (IEEE) in 2012 for her contributions to metal electrodes and high-K dielectrics for CMOS applications.
