= Bina Railway Colony =

- city
- Location in Madhya Pradesh, India Bina Railway Colony (India)
- Coordinates: 24°11′45″N 78°12′20″E
- Country: India
- State: Madhya Pradesh
- District: Sagar

Population (2001)
  - Total: 7,219

Languages
  - Official: Hindi
- Time zone: UTC+5:30 (IST)
- ISO 3166 code: IN-MP
- Vehicle registration: MP

Bina Railway Colony is a census town in Sagar District of state of Madhya Pradesh in India.

== Demographics ==
As of 2001 India census, Bina Railway Colony had a population of 7,219. Males constitute 53% of the population and females 47%. Bina Railway Colony has an average literacy rate of 82%, higher than the national average of 59.5%; with male literacy of 88% and female literacy of 75%. 9% of the population is under 6 years of age.

== See also ==
- Bina Junction railway station
