= Bina (river) =

River in Germany

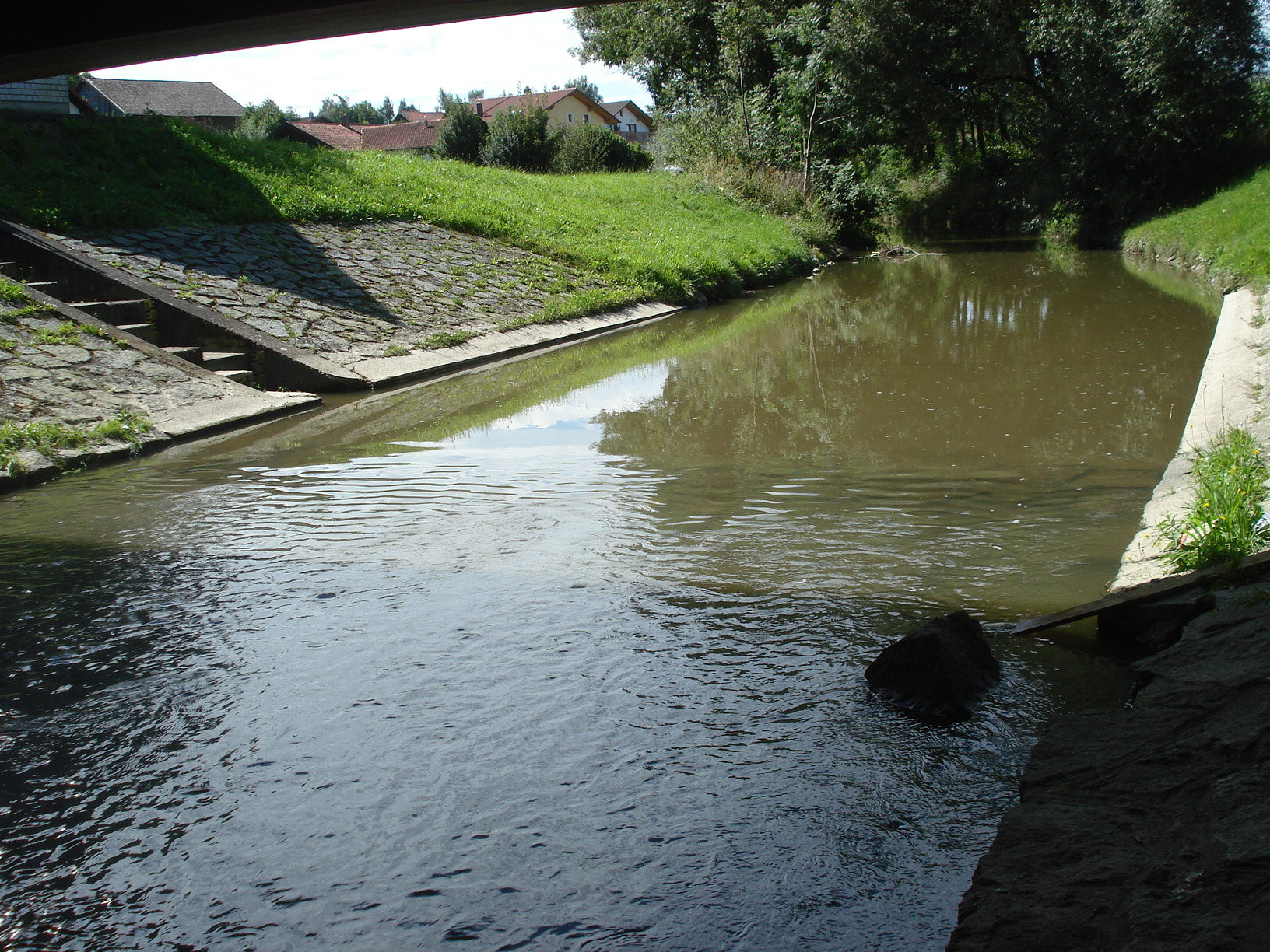
- At the gauge in Panzig
- The river and its source

Location
- Country: Germany
- State: Bavaria

Physical characteristics
- Source: Binaquelle spring
  - location: Wurmsham
  - coordinates: 48.35706°N 12.34965°E
- Mouth: Rott
  - location: Massing
  - coordinates: 48.38982°N 12.63954°E
- Length: 32.0 km (19.9 mi)
- Basin size: 145 km^{2} (56 mi^{2})

Basin features
- Progression: Rott→ Inn→ Danube→ Black Sea

The Bina is a river of Bavaria, Germany. It flows into the Rott near Massing.

== See also ==
- List of rivers of Bavaria
