= Bina Landau =

American singer

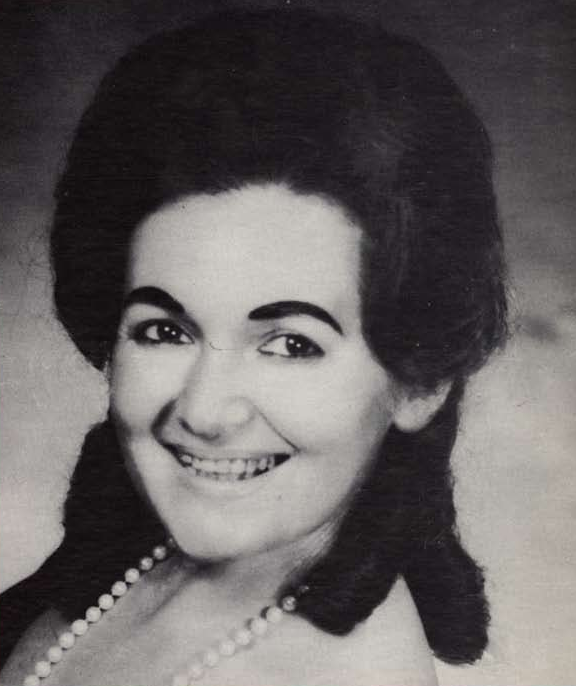
Bina Landau, 1960s

Bina Landau (Yiddish: בינה לאַנדאַו, 1925–1988) was a Polish-born American Soprano folk and art singer active from the 1950s to the 1970s. She primarily performed in Yiddish and Hebrew, interpreting the work of such composers and poets as Itzik Manger, Hayim Nahman Bialik, and Mordechai Gebirtig. She was a Holocaust survivor, having been imprisoned in Bergen-Belsen and other camps during the Second World War.

== Biography ==
She was born Bina Herszberg in Radom, Kielce Voivodeship, Poland on November 1, 1925. She was Jewish; her parents were named Moses (Yichael Moshe) and Sarah (Surah Leah, née Migdajek). She was influenced by her father's love of music, and her musical abilities were already noticed at age 4 by Dr. Milano, a prominent musician in Radom. She joined the Beth-Yakov Temple choir in Radom at 8 years old.

During World War II, following the German Invasion of Poland, she was initially imprisoned in the Kraków Ghetto. She was then sent to four different concentration camps during the course of the war: Majdanek, Auschwitz, Kraków-Płaszów, and Bergen-Belsen. After the end of the war, she lived in the American Zone of Germany and met her future husband, Marion (Mariek-Fiszel) Landau in Garmisch-Partenkirchen; they were married in Stuttgart in January 1946. Bina's parents also survived the Holocaust and she was reunited with them after the war. She and Marion emigrated to the United States, sailing from Bremerhaven to New York City in May 1946; her husband later recalled that she had sung for the fellow Jewish emigrants aboard the ship during the voyage. They soon settled in Philadelphia, where Marion founded a bridal headwear manufacturing company and later became an accountant. Bina auditioned for the choir at the Settlement Music School in 1952, where she was accepted and soon started to receive instruction. She also studied in New York with vocal instructors Arthur Wolf and William Hermann. The Landaus became important figures in the Philadelphia Jewish community; Marion helped found the Jewish New Americans in Philadelphia group, an association of Holocaust survivors, and later created endowments for the Perelman Jewish Day School and the Jewish National Fund. Bina became a well-known performer of Jewish music and would tour extensively in the United States, as well as perform on the radio in New York and Philadelphia for several decades. She appeared at Carnegie Hall for the first time in the early 1950s.

Landau's friendship with Mikhl Gelbart was an important influence on her musical career and her dedication to Yiddish- and Hebrew-language folk and art song. In 1959 she founded a Holocaust Survivor's choir in Philadelphia, and she was also soloist with the Temple Beth Zion-Beth Israel choir for more than two decades. She also had a regular radio program on WEVD in New York and one on WDAS in Philadelphia starting in the mid-1950s. In the early 1960s she went on a month-long tour of Israel.

She died on June 24, 1988, in Philadelphia.

== Discography ==
- Sing Along with Me! Yiddish and Hebrew Songs for Community singing (Famous Records, 1962, compiled by Joseph Mlotek, with choral direction by Vladimir Heifetz)
- Bina Landau sings The Golden Peacock and others (MBL Enterprises, 1971)
- Bina Landau presents Poetry In Song: A Tribute to Michel Gelbart (Famous Records)
- From Russia to Israel: Bina Landau sings (MBL Enterprises)
- El Hatsipor - To the Bird - Songs of Poems by Chaim Nachman Bialik (MBL Enterprises, 1975)
