= Julia Culp =

Dutch mezzo-soprano (1880–1970)

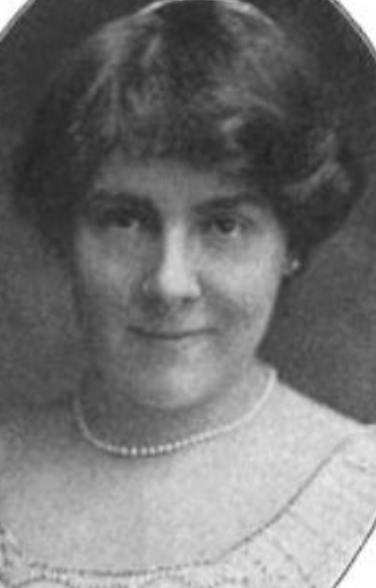
- Julia Culp, from a 1915 publication
- Born: 6 October 1880; Groningen, the Netherlands
- Died: 13 October 1970; Amsterdam, the Netherlands
- Occupation: Opera vocalist

Julia Bertha Culp (6 October 1880 – 13 October 1970), the "Dutch nightingale", was an internationally celebrated mezzo-soprano in the years 1901–1919.

"You might describe Julia Culp as a connoisseur’s singer," Michael Oliver wrote in the International Opera Collector in 2000. "Her voice was not large, her compass not wide. She never sang in opera; striking dramatic gesture were not her line. What she excelled in were the singer’s rather than the vocal actress’s virtues: sustained legato line, remarkable breath control, subtle colour, immaculate care for words…. But ‘connoisseur’s singer’ does not mean that only connoisseurs can appreciate her; one becomes a connoisseur by listening to her."

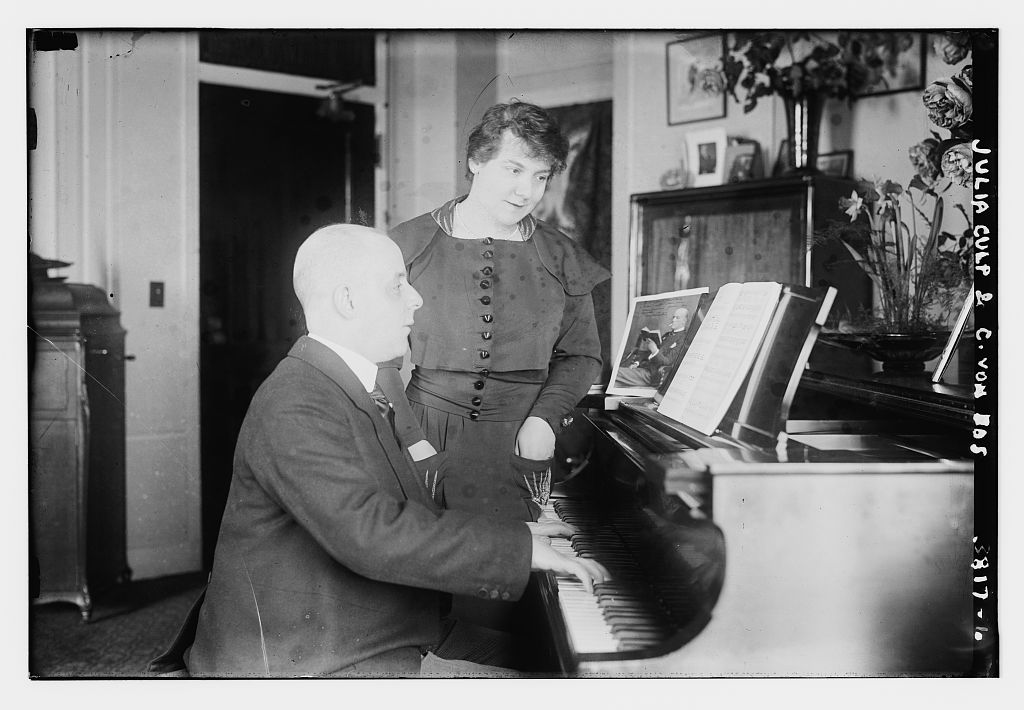
Julia Culp and Coenraad V. Bos circa 1915

== Biography ==
Culp was born in Groningen, the Netherlands into a Jewish family of musicians and comedians. She was the daughter of contrabass player Baruch Culp and his wife Sara Cohen. At the age of seven she began to practice the violin, and at 11 had her first public violin performance. Her first performance as a singer was on 30 December 1893. In the summer of 1896, she left Groningen for Amsterdam, where she studied at the Conservatory under renowned former opera singer Cornélie van Zanten.

Soon after completing her studies in 1900, Culp's singing career took flight. She was discovered by German-American conductor Wilhelm Berger, who took her to Berlin to perform at the concert hall Saal Bechstein in 1901. Before long, she was performing all over Europe and America, sharing the stage with such notable composers, conductors and singers as Edvard Grieg, Richard Strauss, Camille Saint-Saëns, Enrico Caruso, Otto Klemperer, Willem Mengelberg, Pablo Casals, Percy Grainger, Enrique Granados and Thomas Beecham.

As early as 1902 she performed for Queen Wilhelmina of the Netherlands and in 1903 she was invited to sing at the German Imperial Court for Empress Augusta Victoria. In 1911 Culp sang the mezzo-soprano part in the premiere performance of Frederick Delius's Songs of Sunset in London under Thomas Beecham. In 1913, she made her American debut at Carnegie Hall in New York City. In the United States, she soon became known as the "Dutch Nightingale".

Julia Culp made some 90 acoustic recordings between 1906 and 1926. In the United States, she made 41 recordings for the Victor label in the years 1914–17 and in 1924. In July 1926 she made her only electric recordings, in Berlin.

She married Erich Merten on 29 June 1905 and settled in Zehlendorff near Berlin. However, the marriage was unsuccessful and they divorced in 1918. In the meantime, she had met a Czech industrialist, Wilhelm Ginzkey (1856 - 1934), and they married on 23 July 1919. At that time, she converted from Judaism to Catholicism, ended her singing career and moved to Vienna. Julia remained married to Ginzkey until his death in 1934.

In the meantime, the Nazis had come to power in Germany. After the German annexation (Anschluss) of Austria in 1938, Culp fled to the Netherlands, moving in with her sister Betsy in Amsterdam. When the Nazis invaded and occupied The Netherlands in 1940, Culp once again found herself in grave danger. Both she and her sister went into hiding and managed to survive the war. They returned to their flat on the Daniël Willinkplein (Victorieplein) in Amsterdam, where she remained until her death at age 90.

== Sources ==
- Biography of Julia Culp at DutchDivas.net, featuring discography and sound clips
- Biography Julia Culp at the website of Amsterdam's Jewish Historical Museum
- Biography of Julia Culp at joods-leven.net
