= Survey vessel =

Type of research vessel

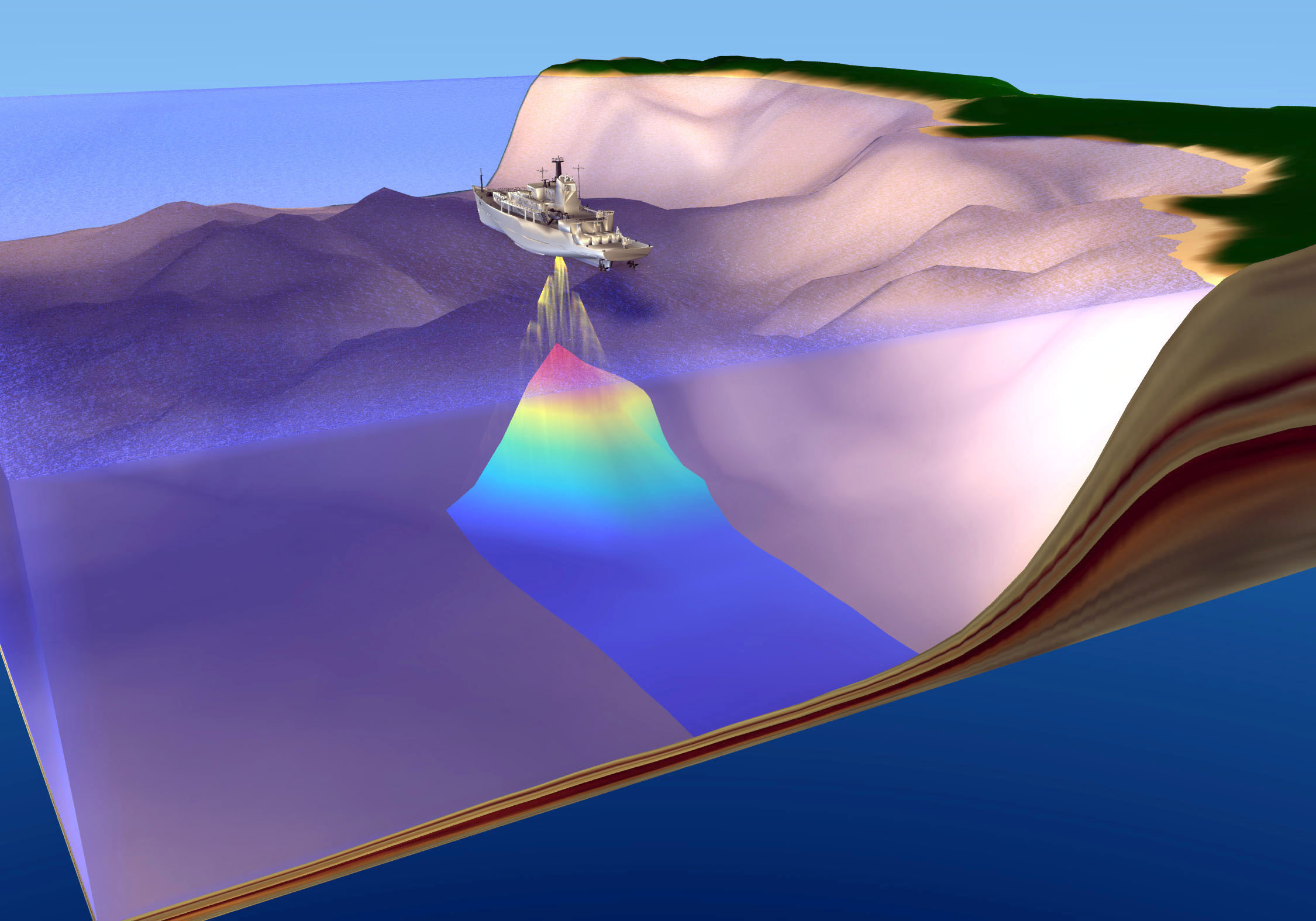
An illustration depicting underwater mapping capability of USNS Bowditch (T-AGS-62)

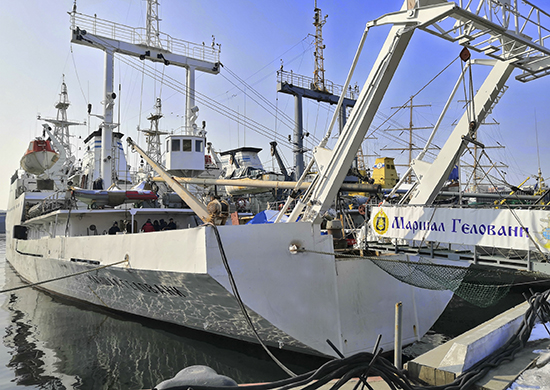
Hydrographic vessel Marshal Gelovani

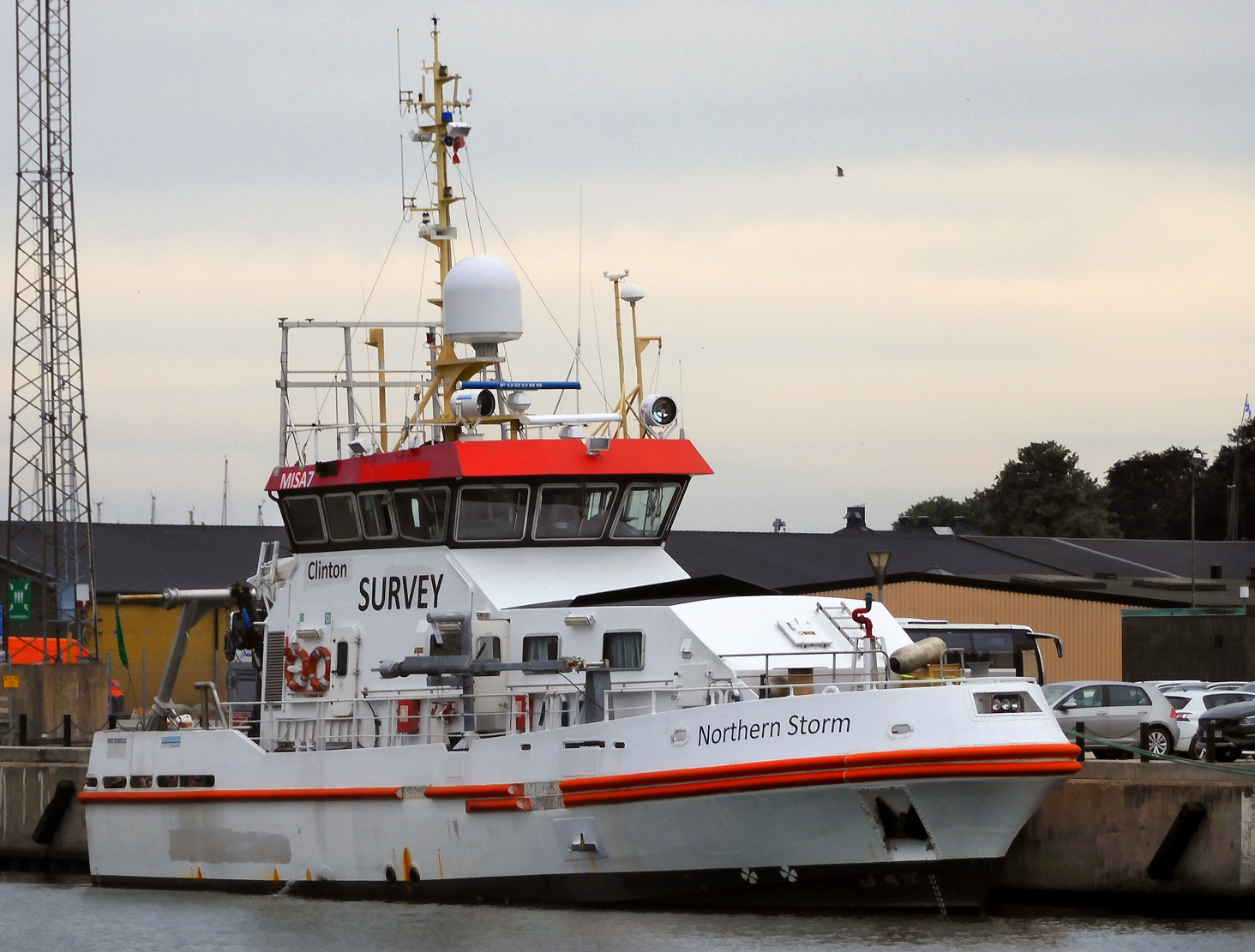
Clintons Northern Storm in the harbour of Ystad 7 July 2021.

A survey vessel is any type of ship or boat that is used for underwater surveys, usually to collect data for mapping or planning underwater construction or mineral extraction. It is a type of research vessel, and may be designed for the purpose, modified for the purpose or temporarily put into the service as a vessel of opportunity, and may be crewed, remotely operated, or autonomous. The size and equipment vary to suit the task and availability.

== Role ==
The task of survey vessels is to map the bottom, and measure the characteristics of the benthic zone, full water column, and surface for the purpose of:

- hydrography, the measurement and description of the physical features of oceans and other natural bodies of water, and the prediction of their change over time, for the primary purpose of safety of navigation and in support of other activities associated with those bodies of water,
- general oceanography, the scientific study of the oceans,
- mapping of marine habitats as part of the process of assessing the state of the ecology,
- measurement of environmental impact of natural and anthropogenic changes,
- planning of marine salvage, the process of recovering a ship and its cargo after a shipwreck or other maritime casualty,
- dredging, the excavation of material from underwater, to recover materials or to alter the bottom profile, usually for navigational of construction purposes,
- underwater construction, which is industrial construction in an underwater environment,
- coastal engineering, the branch of civil engineering concerned with construction at or near the coast, and the development of the coast itself,
- maritime archaeology, the study of human interaction with the sea, lakes and rivers through the study of associated physical remains,
- underwater mining and extraction of petroleum.

== Survey equipment ==
Typically, modern survey vessels are equipped with one or more of the following equipment:

- Satellite navigation to provide autonomous geo-spatial positioning,
- Single beam sonar for the measurement of underwater physical and biological components,
- Multibeam sonar to accurately and efficiently map the seabed
- Side-scan sonar to efficiently create relief images of large areas of the sea floor.
- Towed magnetometer for measuring the Earth's magnetic field, in geophysical surveys, to detect magnetic anomalies,
- Reflection seismology equipment for subsurface profiling. Seismic sources include air guns, sparkers and boomers.
- Bottom sampling equipment such as Van Veen grab sampler, Box corer, Epibenthic sled or other core sampling equipment.
- CTD sondes to measure the electrical conductivity, temperature, and pressure of seawater
- Inertial measurement unit

== Unmanned and autonomous survey vessels ==
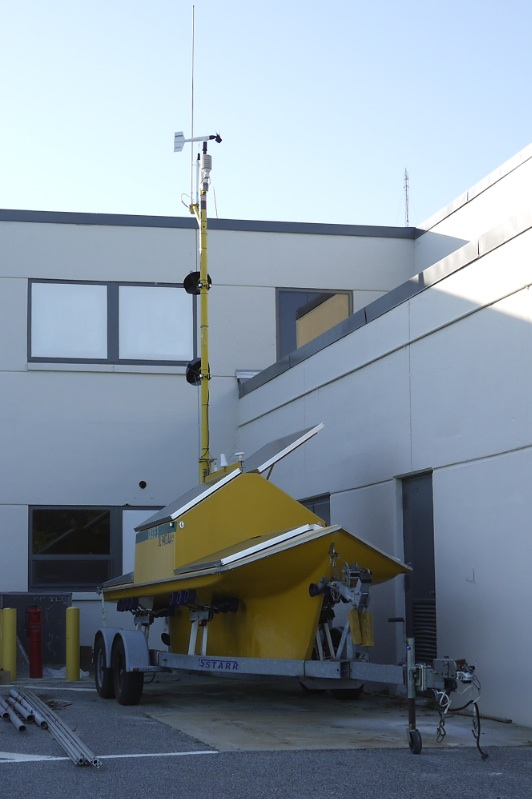
USV used in oceanographic research, June 2011

Unmanned surface vehicles (USVs; also known as unmanned surface vessels or in some cases autonomous surface vehicles (ASVs), uncrewed surface vessels, or colloquially, drone ships) are boats or ships that operate on the surface of the water without a crew. USVs operate with various levels of autonomy, from simple remote control, to autonomous COLREGs compliant navigation.

An autonomous survey vessel is an unmanned vessel fitted with survey equipment and capable of operating without human supervision while performing survey work, either uploading the data in real time, or at pre-programmed stages, or on a remote command. Autonomous underwater vehicles set up for survey work are a subclass of autonomous survey vessels that operate underwater. unmanned survey vessels are usually relatively small and therefore economical to acquire and operate, and can be sent to areas too hazardous for a larger or crewed vessel, as well as for extensive and time-consuming but routine surveys.

USVs are valuable in oceanography, as they are more capable than moored or drifting weather buoys, but far cheaper than the equivalent weather ships and research vessels, and more flexible than commercial-ship contributions, and, with solar cells to power their electronics, can have months of marine persistence. Powered USVs are a powerful tool for use in hydrographic survey. Using a small USV in parallel to traditional survey vessels as a 'force-multiplier' can double survey coverage and reduce time on-site.

== See also ==
- Office of Coast Survey
- United States Coast and Geodetic Survey
