= Veenstra =

Veenstra is a Dutch (originally Frisian) toponymic surname equivalent to the surnames Van der Veen and Van Veen. Notable people with the surname include:

- Bas Veenstra (born 1995), Dutch basketball player
- Erin Veenstra (born 1978), American cyclist
- Herman Veenstra (1911–2004), Dutch water polo player
- Johan Veenstra (born 1946), Dutch writer
- Johanna Veenstra (1894–1933), American missionary
- Kenneth Veenstra (born 1939), American politician
- Manon Veenstra (born 1998), Dutch BMX racer
- Michiel Veenstra (born 1976), Dutch radio personality
- Myrna Veenstra (born 1975), Dutch field hockey player
- René Veenstra (born 1969), Dutch sociologist
- Richard Veenstra (born 1981), Dutch darts player
- Rogier Veenstra (born 1987), Dutch footballer
- Tine Veenstra (born 1983), Dutch bobsledder
- Wiebren Veenstra (born 1966), Dutch cyclist
- Wietse Veenstra (born 1946), Dutch footballer

== See also ==
- Feenstra, variant spelling of the surname
