= Feenstra =

Feenstra is a Dutch (originally Frisian) toponymic surname. It is a spelling variant of Veenstra and equivalent to the surnames Van der Veen and Van Veen. Notable people with the surname include:

- Katie Feenstra (born 1982), American basketball player
- Kim Feenstra (born 1985), Dutch model
- Randall M. Feenstra (born 1956), physicist
- Randy Feenstra (born 1969), American politician from Iowa
- Rienk Feenstra (1920–2005), Dutch philatelist
- Robert Feenstra (born 1956), American economist

== See also ==
- Kirchberg v. Feenstra, a 1981 United States Supreme Court case
