= Van de Ven =

Van de Ven, Van der Ven and Vandeven are toponymic surnames of Dutch origin. The original bearer may have lived or worked near a ven, a Dutch term for a small lake, like fen ("veen" in Dutch) derived from the Proto-Germanic fanją. Van der Plas and Van der Poel are equivalent Dutch surnames. The name (in the form of van den Venne) can be found as early as the first part of the 14th century in Oirschot. The name is quite common in the Netherlands, ranking 41st in 2007 (16,282 people). People with this surname include:

- Andrew H. Van de Ven (1945–2022), American business theorist
- Cornelius Van de Ven (1865–1932), Dutch-born American Roman Catholic bishop
- Hans van de Ven (born 1958), Dutch sinologist
- Jan van de Ven (1925–2013), Dutch politician
- Kirsten van de Ven (born 1985), Dutch footballer
- Micky van de Ven (born 2001), Dutch footballer
- Monique van de Ven (born 1952), Dutch actress and film director
- Pauline van de Ven (born 1956), Dutch writer and artist
- Peter van de Ven (born 1961), Dutch footballer
- Ton van de Ven (1931–2014), Dutch mathematician
- Ton van de Ven (1944–2015), Dutch industrial designer

Van der Ven:

- Dirk van der Ven (born 1970), Dutch footballer
- Joop van der Ven (1907–1988), Dutch jurist
- Kees van der Ven (born ca. 1956), Dutch motorcycle racer
- Remco van der Ven (born 1975), Dutch cyclist
- Rick van der Ven (born 1991), Dutch archer

== See also ==
- Van de Venne
- Van der Veen
