= Veen =

Veen may refer to:

== Surname ==
- Hans-Joachim Veen (born 1944), German political scientist
- Hendrik Veen (1823–1905), Dutch photographer in the Dutch East Indies
- Ine Veen (born 1937), Dutch ballet dancer and actress
- Stephan Veen (born 1970), Dutch field hockey player
- Tom Veen (1942–2014), Dutch politician
- Zac Veen (born 2001), American baseball player

== Other uses ==
- Veen, Netherlands, a village in the municipality of Altena
- Veen Media, a Dutch media company
- VEEN, a Finnish bottled water brand
- Veen Observatory, south of Lowell, Michigan, United States

== See also ==
- Van Veen, Dutch surname
- Van der Veen, Dutch surname
- Veena (disambiguation)
