= Van der Veen =

Van der Veen is a common Dutch surname, meaning "from the fen" or more generally "from the peatlands". In the Netherlands 19,847 people carried the name in 2007, making it the 32nd most common surname there. Dutch surnames with the same origin and meaning are Van Veen, Van de Ven/Van der Ven, Van de Venne, Veen, and Veenstra/Feenstra. The name was often taken by peat workers, as harvest of turf for fuel was abundant in the Netherlands. Since the early Middle Ages, the quarry of fens (laagveen, "low fen") in the north and west created, merged or extended many lakes, most of which have now been reclaimed as polders. The harvest of turf from bogs (hoogveen, "high fen") in the east, like the large Bourtange moor, extended until the 20th century.

Notable people with the surname include:

Van der Veen

- Astrid van der Veen (born 1986), Dutch pop singer
- Balthasar van der Veen (1596–1660), Dutch landscape painter
- Dave van der Veen, Dutch mixed martial artist
- Dennis van der Veen (born 1982), Dutch volleyball player
- Eelke van der Veen (born 1946), Dutch politician
- Fiel van der Veen (born 1945), Dutch illustrator
- Frans van der Veen (1919–1975), Dutch footballer
- Gerrit van der Veen (1902–1944), Dutch sculptor
- Jan van der Veen (1578–1659), Dutch poet
- Jan van der Veen (born 1948), Dutch footballer
- Jitse van der Veen (1928–1976), Dutch swimmer
- Marten van der Veen (born 1946), British air marshal
- Michael van der Veen (born 1963), American attorney
- Paulus van der Veen (c. 1660 – 1733), Dutch governor of Suriname
- Robert van der Veen (1906–1996), Dutch field hockey player
- Wim van der Veen, Dutch bowling player

Van de Veen

- Adriaen van de Veen (1589–1662), Dutch Golden Age painter

Vander Veen

- Richard Vander Veen (1922–2006), Michigan state politician

== See also ==
- Van der Veen Ice Stream, ice stream in Antarctica named after the glaciologist Kees van der Veen (born 1956)
