= Van Veen =

Van Veen is a Dutch toponymic surname. Notable people with the surname include:

- Anne van Veen (born 1983), Dutch cabaret artist, daughter of Herman
- Anneloes van Veen (born 1990), Dutch competitive sailor
- Babette van Veen (born 1968), Dutch actor and singer, daughter of Herman
- Chris van Veen (1922–2009), Dutch State Secretary, minister and chairperson of VNO
- Gertruida van Veen (1602–1643), Flemish painter
- Gian van Veen (born 2002), Dutch professional darts player
- Gijsbert van Veen (1558–1630), Dutch painter and engraver, brother of Otto
- Herman van Veen (born 1945), Dutch singer and actor
- Jeroen van Veen (born 1969), Dutch pianist
- Jeroen van Veen (born 1974), Dutch bassist
- Johan van Veen (1893–1959), Dutch civil engineer who originated the Delta Works
- José van Veen (born 1986), Dutch rower
- Kevin van Veen (born 1991), Dutch footballer
- Leo van Veen (born 1946), Dutch football player and coach
- Maarten van Veen (born 1971), Dutch pianist and conductor
- Maerten van Veen, better known as Maarten van Heemskerck (1498–1574), Dutch painter
- Michiel van Veen (born 1971), Dutch politician
- Otto van Veen or Otto Venius (c.1556–1629), Dutch painter, draughtsman, and humanist
- Pieter van Veen (born 1998), Dutch rower
- Ricky Van Veen (born c. 1981), American entrepreneur, co-founder of CollegeHumor
- Rie van Veen (1923–1995), Dutch swimmer
- Rochus van Veen (1630–1693), Dutch painter
- Rudolph van Veen (born 1967), Dutch TV-chef and cookbook author
- Sietze Douwes van Veen (1856–1924), Dutch theologian
- Stuyvesant Van Veen (1910–1988), American artist and muralist
- Suzanne van Veen (born 1987), Dutch cyclist
- Sven van Veen (born 1961), member of Dutch hip-hop duo MC Miker G & DJ Sven

== See also ==
- Ada or Ardor: A Family Chronicle, a novel in which one of the primary characters is named Van Veen
- Mount Van Veen, a mountain in Antarctica, named after the American geologist Richard C. Van Veen
- Van der Veen, Dutch surname
- Van Veen (motorcycle), a Dutch former manufacturer of motorcycles
- Van Veen Grab Sampler, an instrument to sample sediment in the ocean
- Veen (disambiguation)
