= Johan Veenstra =

Johan Veenstra (born 6 January 1946) is an author, poet, columnist and former radio host from the Dutch province Friesland known for his work in his mother tongue Stellingwervian Low German, for which he was invested as a Knight of the Order of Orange-Nassau.

== Personal life ==
Veenstra was born on 6 January 1946 in the maternity hospital of Wolvega, Weststellingwerf in the Saxon part of Friesland, as sole child of an unmarried mother. He grew up in Nijeholtpade in the same municipality, where he still lives. Veenstra only discovered the identity of his father, as well as the existence of his half-brother, after his mother's death—a subject that features in some of his poetry, such as the poem Breur, (Note: Published as part of the poetry collection Winterlaand) and in his autobiographical novel Een brogge van glas, in which he also writes about his homosexuality.

== His work ==
Veenstra is one of the core members and best-known writers of the Stellingwarf linguistic movement. In 2001, he was invested as a Knight of the Order of Orange-Nassau for his work in and for the Stellingwarfs dialect. His debut novel Een vlinder van zulver (1981) was the first regional-language literature in the Netherlands to feature modern literary devices such as flashbacks and stream of consciousness.

Veenstra made his debut as regional-language writer in 1971 as columnist in the Leeuwarder Courant. He also wrote and read weekly columns ("Stellingwarver Stiekelstokkies") on Omrop Fryslân's radio. A selection of these were published as books with accompanying audio tape in 1991, 1993 and 1995. In 2001, a selection of 24 columns was released on CD.

== Publications ==
- Wilde Gaanzen, stories and poetry, 1974
- Fluitekruud, stories, 1977
- As de wilde roze bluuit, poetry, 1979
- Een vlinder van zulver, novel, 1981
- Naachs goelen de honnen, novel, 1984
- Lamert en Lutske, stories, 1987
- De toren van De Lichtmis, stories, 1988
- Lamert, Lutske en Doerak, stories, 1990
- Stellingwarver Stiekelstokkies, radio columns, 1991
- De boot naor Valhöll, stories, 1992
- Stellingwarver Stiekelstokkies 2, radio columns, 1993
- Sletel parredies, poetry, 1994
- Stellingwarver Stiekelstokkies 3, radio columns, 1995
- Een meenske is gien eerpel, stories, 1997
- Verrassend Stellingwarfs, stories, 1998
- Toegift, novel, 1999
- Winterlaand, poetry, 2001
- Wonder boven wonder, stories, 2002
- De wereld is gek, stories, 2004
- Een brogge van glas, novel, 2006
- Longerlaand, poetry (with Peter Hiemstra), 2007
- Et geheim van de wiend, novel, 2009
- In brêge fan glês, novel, 2009 (Frisian translation of Een brogge van glas)
- Mit et waeter veur de dokter, stories, 2012
- Een vrouw van ivoor, novel, 2015
- De overkaant van et waeter, poems, 2017
- Vroeger is veurgoed veurbi'j, novel, 2018
- Et liek in de Lende, literary thriller, 2021
- Naozoemerlaand, stories, 2023
