= Wim van der Veen =

Dutch ten-pin bowler

Wim van der Veen from the Netherlands, is a Tenpin bowler. He finished in 24th position at the 2006 AMF World Cup and played in the 2006 World Tenpin Masters.
