= Benthic zone =

Ecological region at the lowest level of a body of water

The benthic zone, from Ancient Greek βένθος (bénthos) 'the depths of the ocean', is the ecological region at the lowest level of a body of water, such as a stream, river, lake, or ocean, including the sediment surface and some sub-surface layers.

Organisms living in this zone are called benthos or, more informally, bottom dwellers. They include microorganisms such as bacteria and fungi, as well as larger invertebrates such as crustaceans and polychaetes. Benthos generally live in close relationship with the substrate and many are permanently attached to the bottom. The benthic boundary layer, which includes the bottom layer of water and the uppermost layer of sediment directly influenced by the overlying water, is an integral part of the benthic zone, as it greatly influences the biological activity that takes place there. Examples of contact soil layers include sand bottoms, rocky outcrops, coral, and bay mud.

== Physical description ==
=== Oceans ===
The benthic region of the ocean begins at the shore line (intertidal or littoral zone) and extends downward along the surface of the continental shelf out to sea. Thus, the region incorporates a great variety of physical conditions differing in depth, light penetration and pressure. The benthic zone includes all areas of bottom that are below the water.

The continental shelf is a benthic region of a tectonic plate that extends away from the shoreline of a land mass. At the continental shelf edge, usually about 200 metres (660 ft) deep, the gradient greatly increases and is known as the continental slope. The continental slope drops down to the deep sea floor. The generally flat part of the deep-sea floor is called the abyssal plain and is usually about 4,000 metres (13,000 ft) deep. The ocean floor is not all flat but has submarine ridges, seamounts and deep ocean trenches known as the hadal zone. For comparison, the pelagic zone is the ecological region above the benthos, comprising the water column up to the surface. The benthos of the deep ocean includes the bottom levels of the oceanic abyssal zone.

The deeper areas of the oceans beyond the penetration of daylight are the aphotic zone. Generally, this region is inhabited by life forms that tolerate cool temperatures and low oxygen levels, depending on the depth of the water.

=== Lakes ===
As with oceans, the benthic zone is the floor of the lake, which may be covered by accumulated sunken organic matter and mineral sediments, and the organisms that live in and on it. The littoral zone is the zone bordering the shore; light penetrates easily and aquatic plants thrive. The pelagic zone is the water between the surface and the bottom. the photic zone is the water column down to the depth to which no light penetrates. This depth varies depending on clarity of the water.

== Benthos ==
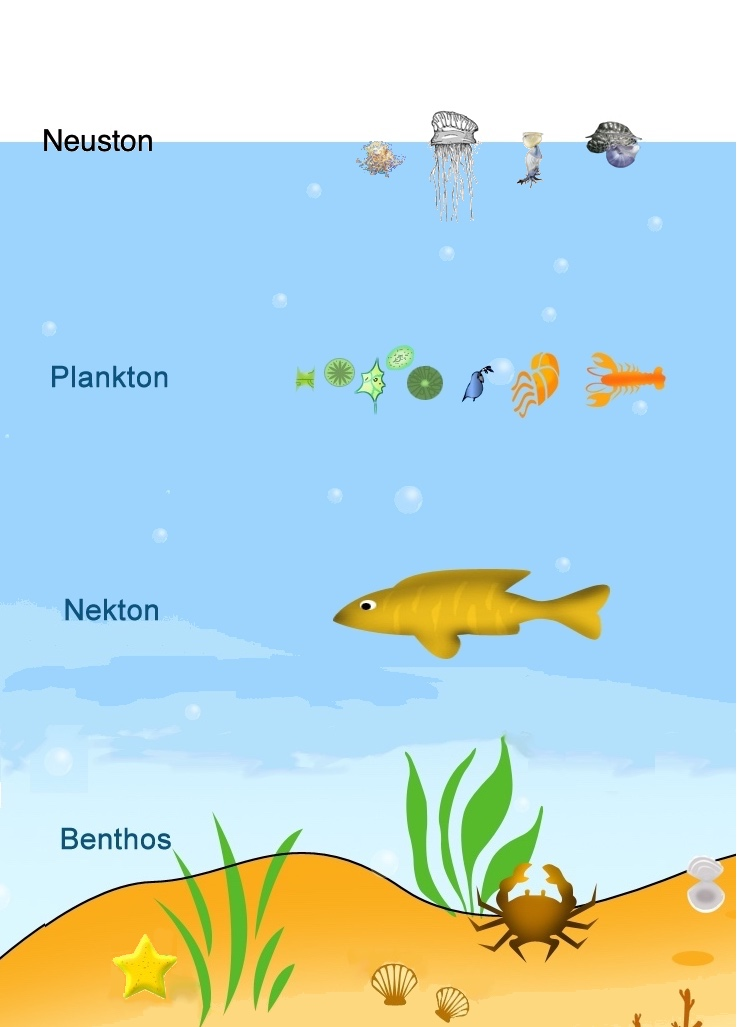
Benthos (organisms that live at the ocean floor) can be contrasted with neuston (organisms that live at the ocean surface) plankton (organisms that drift with water currents) and nekton (organisms that can swim against water currents)

Benthos is the community of organisms that live in the benthic zone, that is, on, in, or near the bottom of a stream, river, lake, or ocean. This community lives in or near marine or freshwater sedimentary environments, from tidal pools along the foreshore, out to the continental shelf, and then down to the abyssal depths.

The term benthos, coined by Haeckel in 1891, comes from the Greek noun βένθος 'depth of the ocean'. Additionally to oceans, benthos is also used in freshwater biology to refer to organisms at the bottom of freshwater bodies of water, such as streams, rivers, and lakes. There is also a redundant, occasionally used synonym, benthon. Benthos is also referred to more loosely and informally as bottom dwellers or bottom feeders.

Light is an important energy source for shallow benthic systems. However, because light is absorbed before it can reach deep ocean water, the energy source for deep benthic ecosystems is often organic matter from higher up in the water column that drifts down to the depths. This dead and decaying matter sustains the benthic food chain; most organisms in the benthic zone are scavengers or detritivores.

Many organisms adapted to deep-water pressure cannot survive in the upper parts of the water column. The pressure difference can be significant (approximately one atmosphere for every 10 metres of water depth).

Compared to the relatively featureless pelagic zone, the benthic zone offers physically diverse habitats. There is a huge range in how much light and warmth is available, and in the depth of water or extent of intertidal immersion. The seafloor varies widely in the types of sediment it offers. Burrowing animals can find protection and food in soft, loose sediments such as mud, clay and sand. Sessile species such as oysters and barnacles can attach themselves securely to hard, rocky substrates. As adults they can remain at the same site, shaping depressions and crevices where mobile animals find refuge. This greater diversity in benthic habitats has resulted in a higher diversity of benthic species. The number of benthic animal species exceeds one million. This far exceeds the number of pelagic animal species (about 5000 larger zooplankton species, 22,000 pelagic fish species and 110 marine mammal species).

Benthos are the organisms that live in the benthic zone, and are different from those elsewhere in the water column; even within the benthic zone variations in such factors as substrate, light penetration, temperature and salinity give rise to distinct differences, delineated vertically, in the groups of organisms supported. Many organisms adapted to deep-water pressure cannot survive in the upper parts of the water column: the pressure difference can be very significant (approximately one atmosphere for each 10 meters of water depth). Many have adapted to live on the substrate (bottom) or within the upper layers of the bottom. In their habitats they can be considered as dominant creatures, but they are often a source of prey for Carcharhinidae such as the lemon shark.

Because light does not penetrate very deep into ocean-water, the energy source for the benthic ecosystem is often marine snow. Marine snow is organic matter from higher up in the water column that drifts down to the depths. This dead and decaying matter sustains the benthic food chain; most organisms in the benthic zone are scavengers or detritivores. Some microorganisms use chemosynthesis to produce biomass.

Benthic organisms can be divided into two categories based on whether they make their home on the ocean floor or a few centimeters into the ocean floor. Those living on the surface of the ocean floor are known as epifauna. Those who live burrowed into the ocean floor are known as infauna. Extremophiles, including piezophiles, which thrive in high pressures, may also live there.

=== By size ===
==== Macrobenthos ====
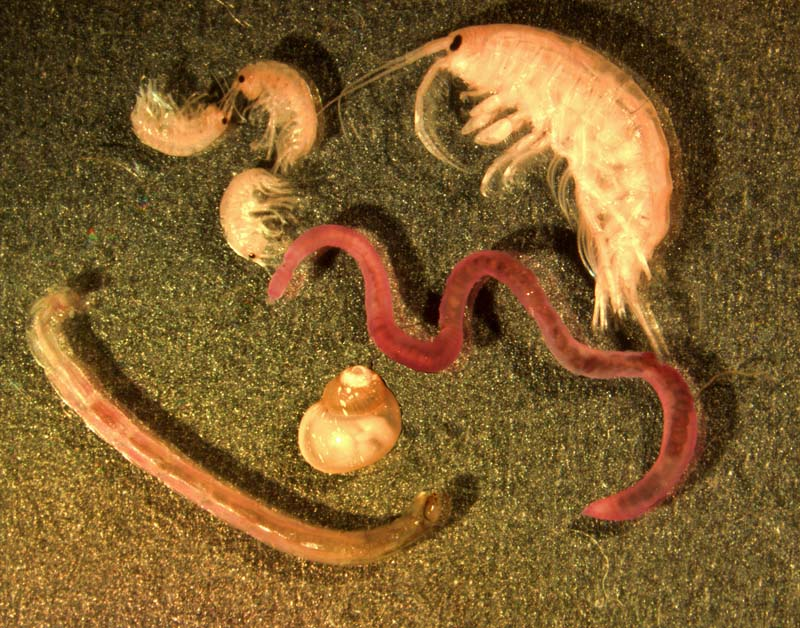
Photomicrograph of typical benthic animals, including (from top to bottom) amphipods, a polychaete worm, a snail, and a chironomous midge larva

Macrobenthos, prefix from Ancient Greek makrós 'long', comprises the larger, visible to the naked eye, benthic organisms greater than about 1 mm in size. In shallow waters, seagrass meadows, coral reefs and kelp forests provide particularly rich habitats for macrobenthos. Some examples are polychaete worms, bivalves, echinoderms, sea anemones, corals, sponges, sea squirts, turbellarians and larger crustaceans such as crabs, lobsters and cumaceans.

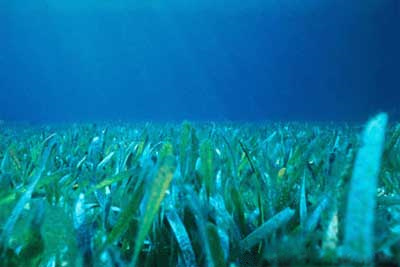
Seagrass

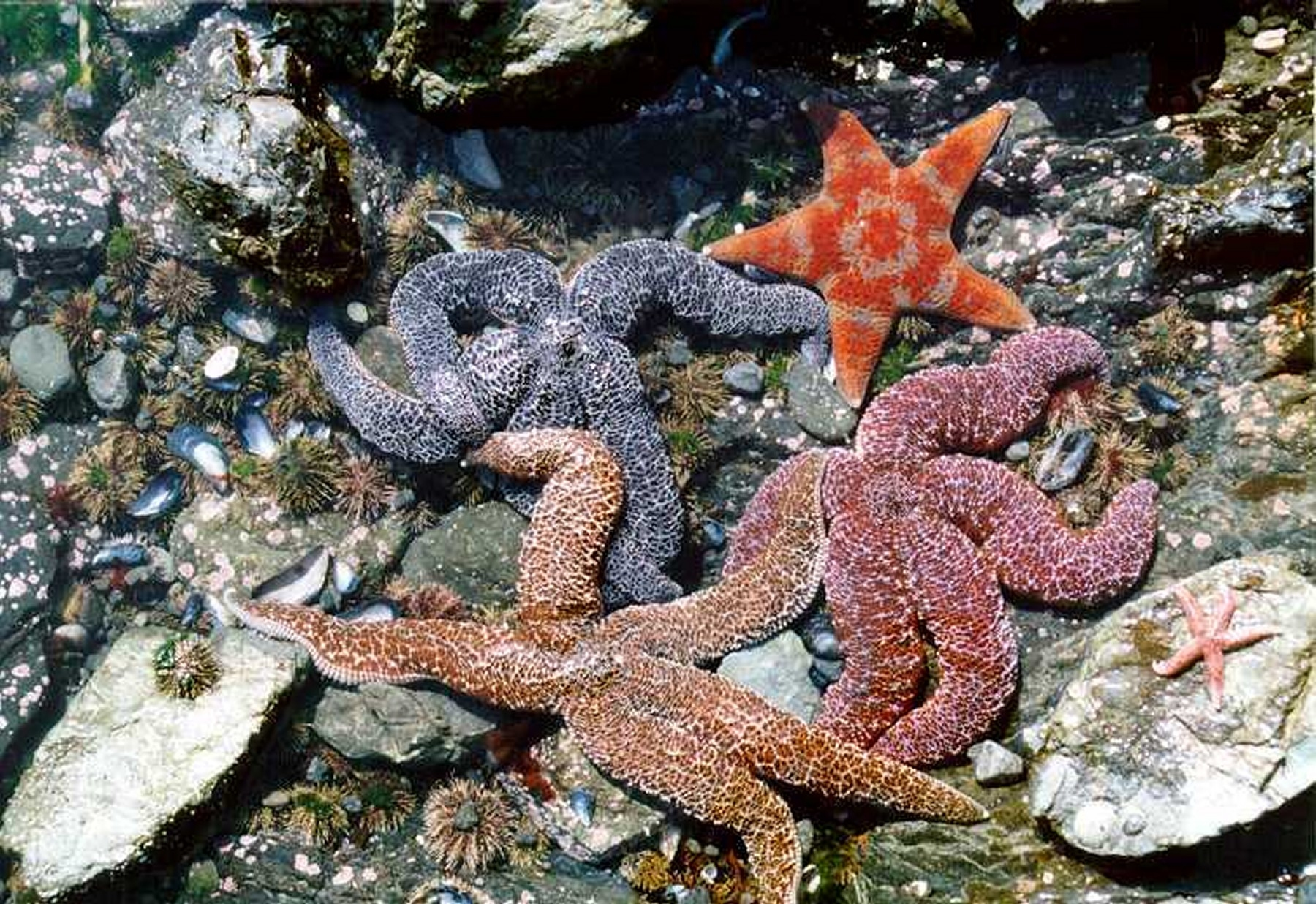
Echinoderms

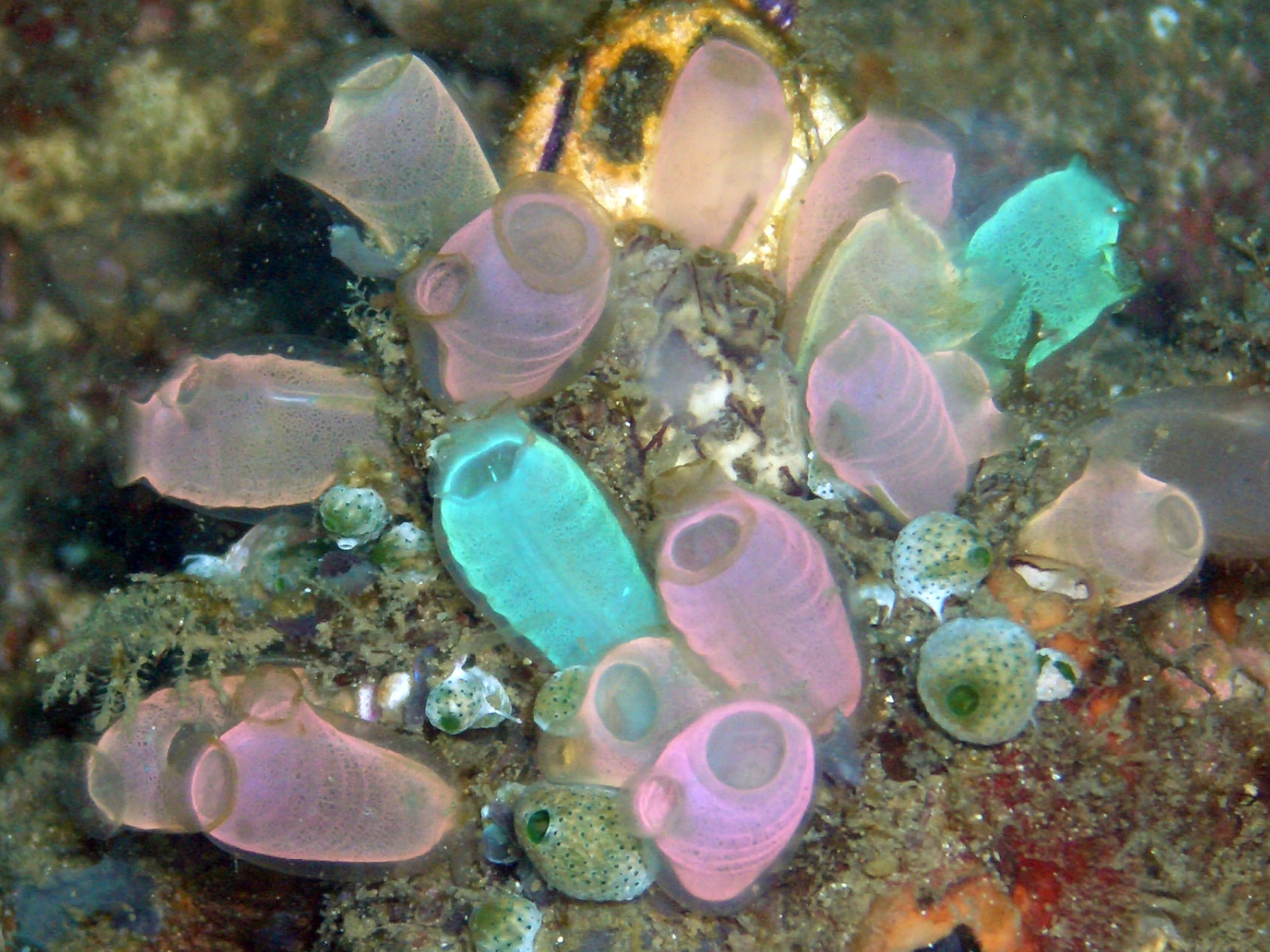
Sea squirts

==== Meiobenthos ====
Meiobenthos, prefix from Ancient Greek meîon 'less', comprises tiny benthic organisms that are less than about 1 mm but greater than about 0.1 mm in size. Some examples are nematodes, foraminiferans, tardigrades, gastrotriches and smaller crustaceans such as copepods and ostracodes.

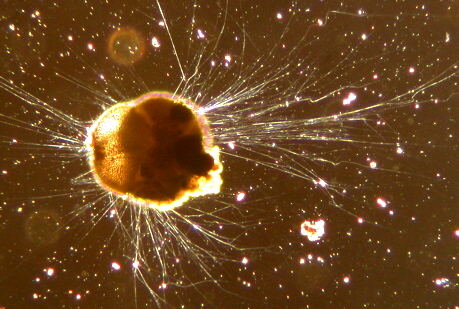
Foraminiferan

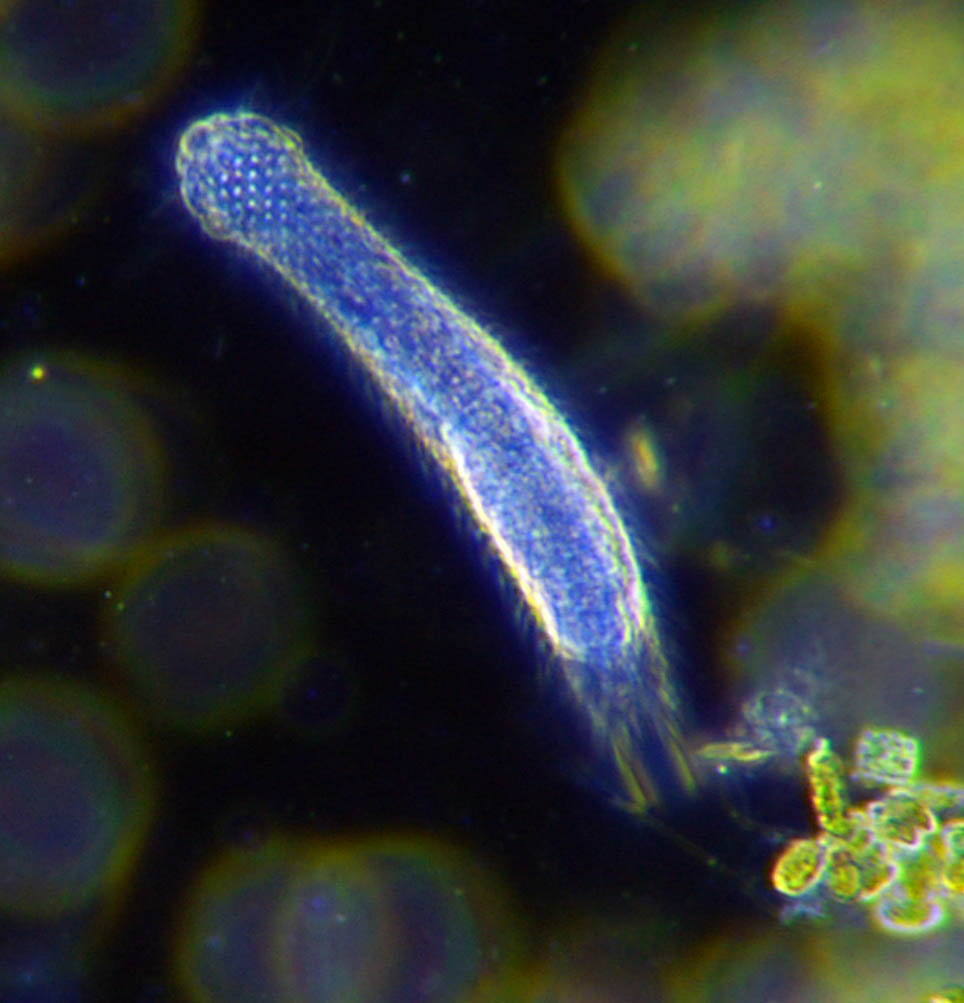
Gastrotrich

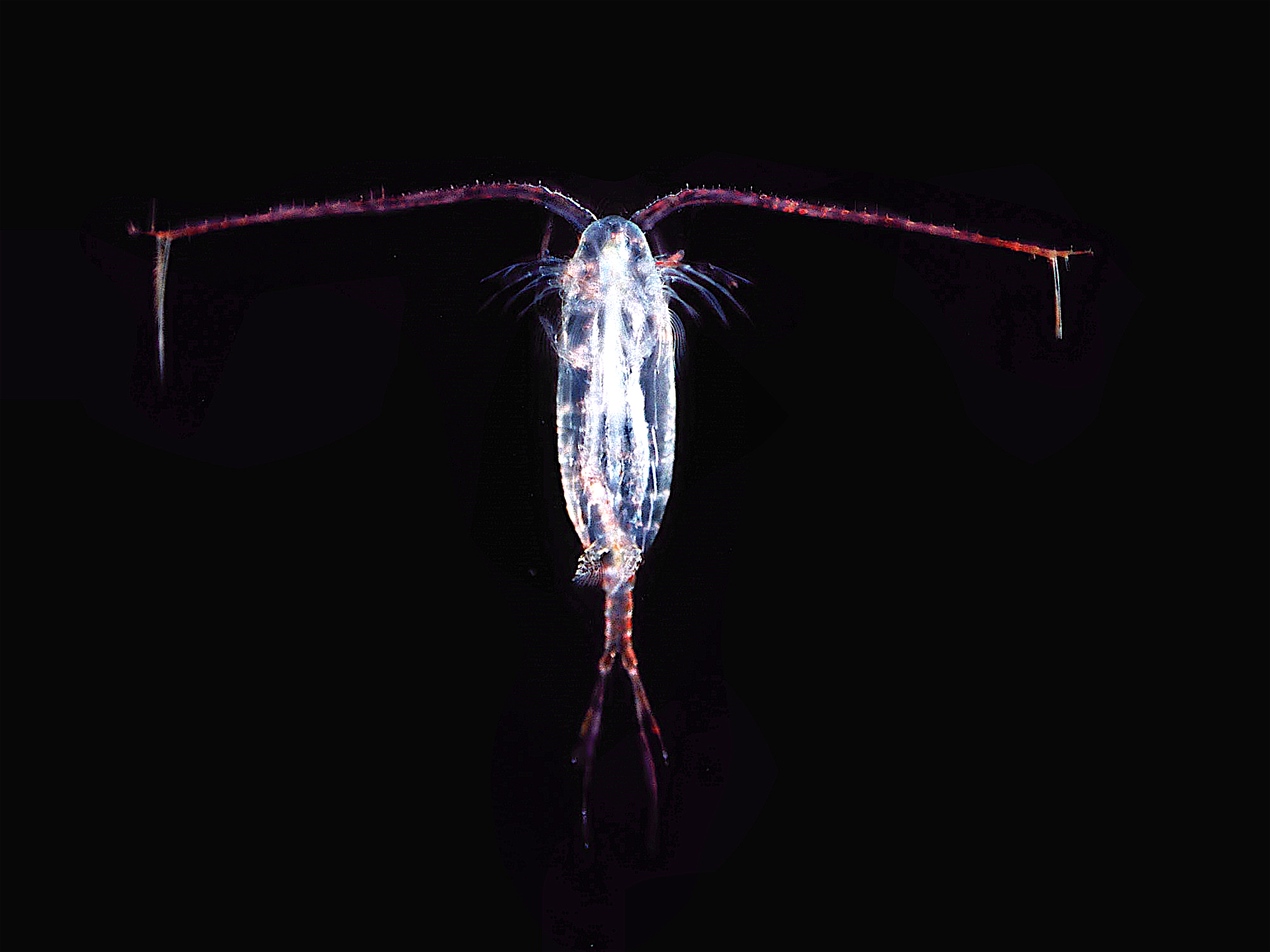
Copepod

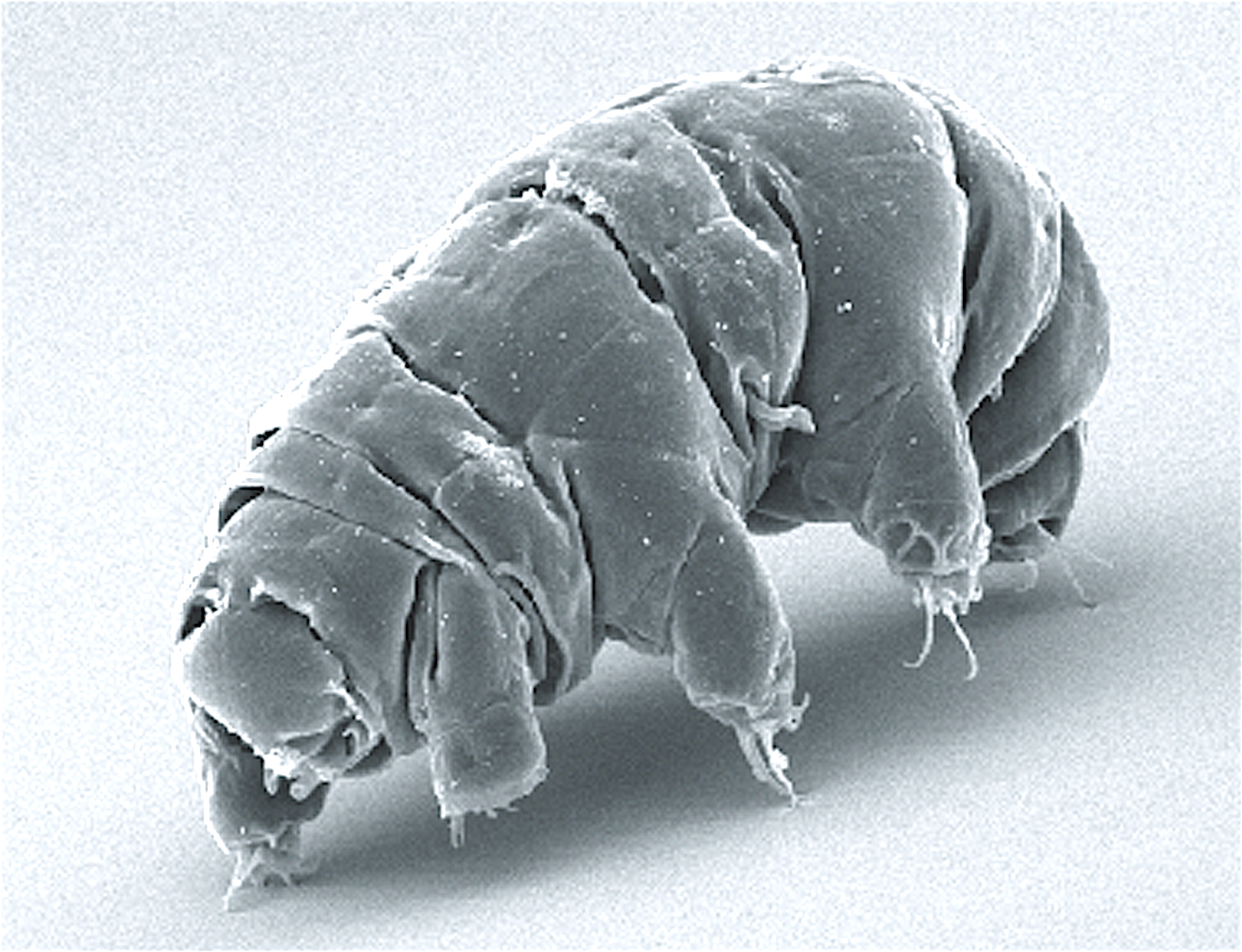
Tardigrade (water bear)

==== Microbenthos ====
Microbenthos, prefix from the Greek mikrós 'small', comprises microscopic benthic organisms that are less than about 0.1 mm in size. Some examples are bacteria, diatoms, ciliates, amoeba, flagellates.

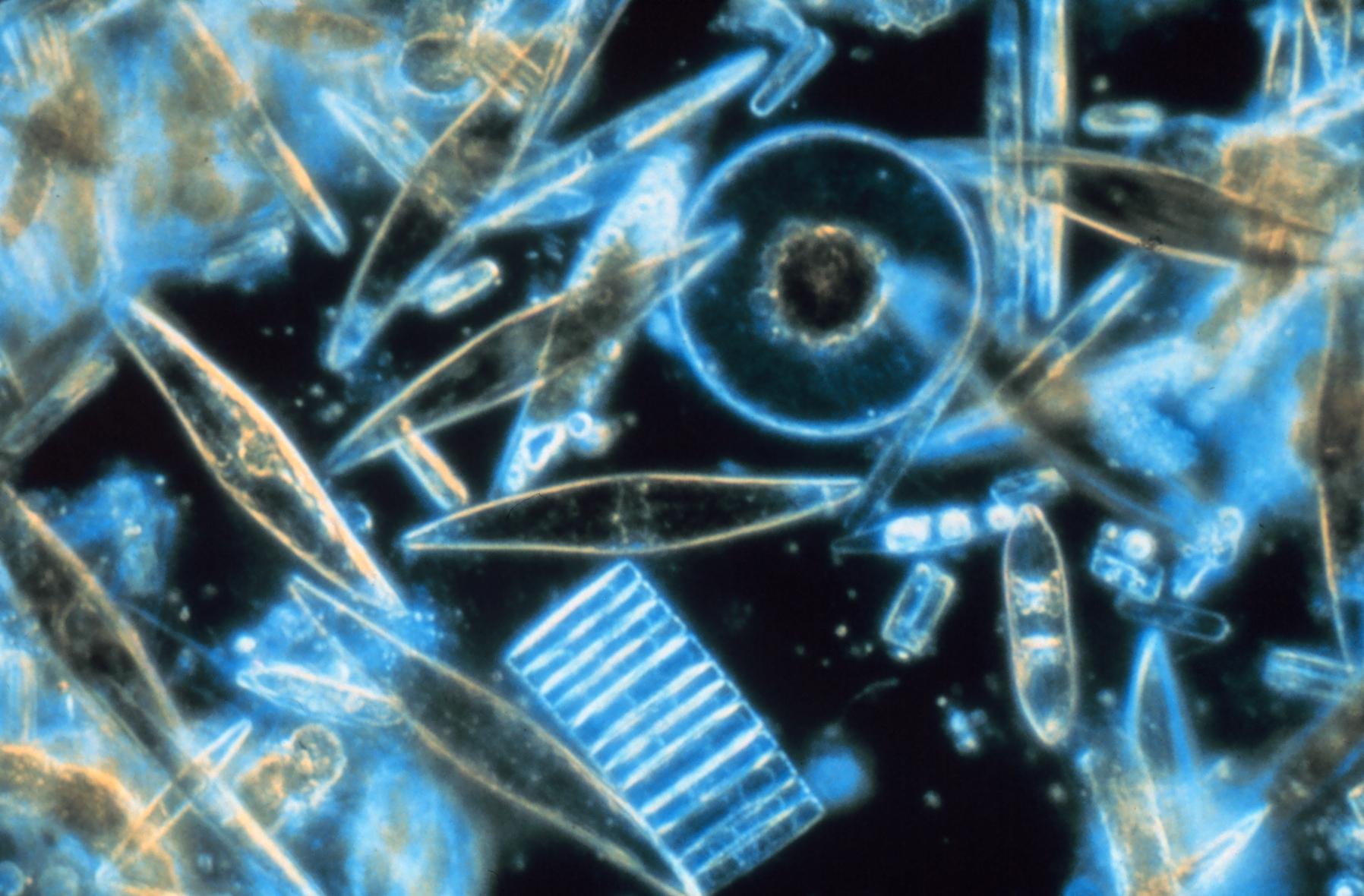
Diatoms

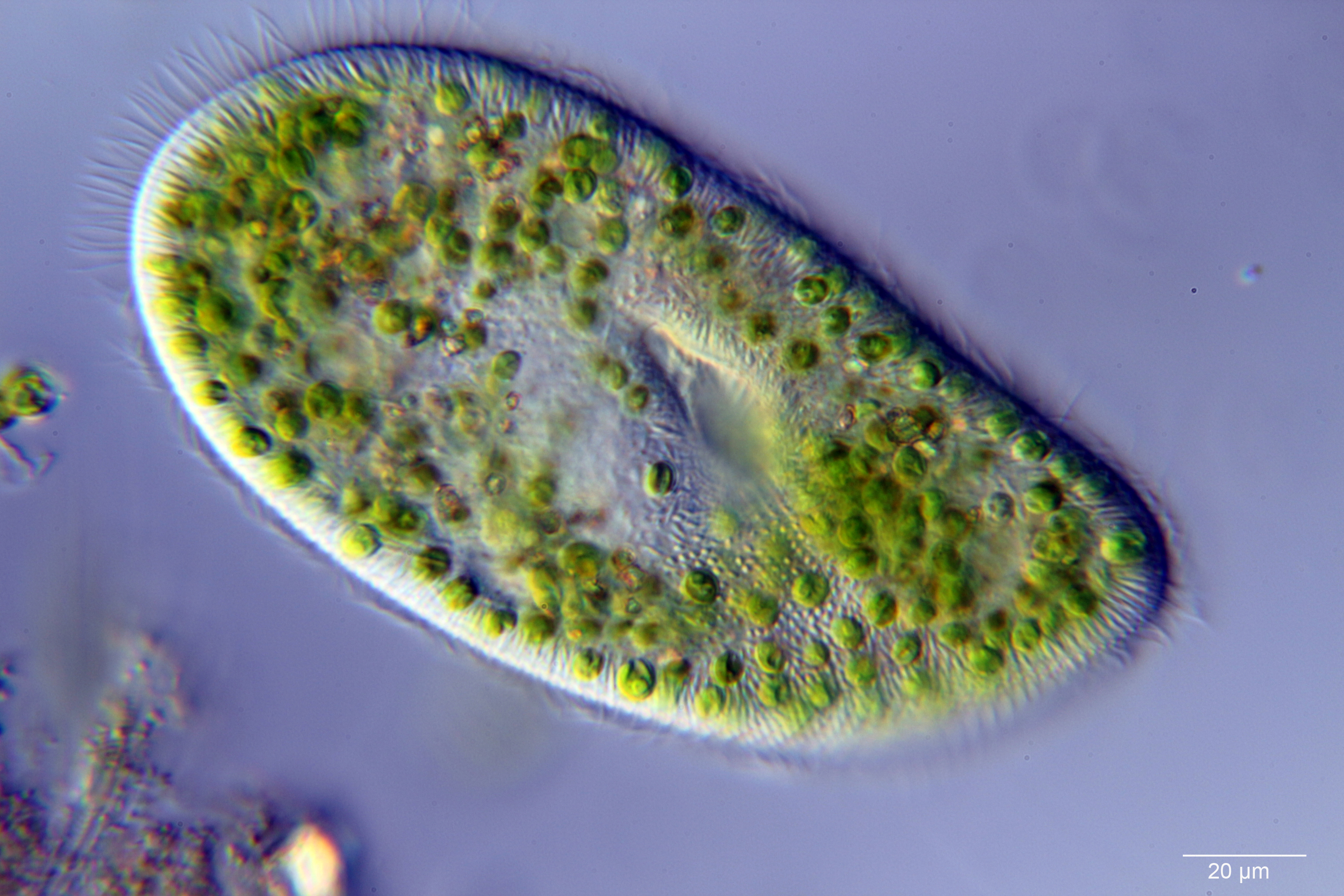
Ciliate

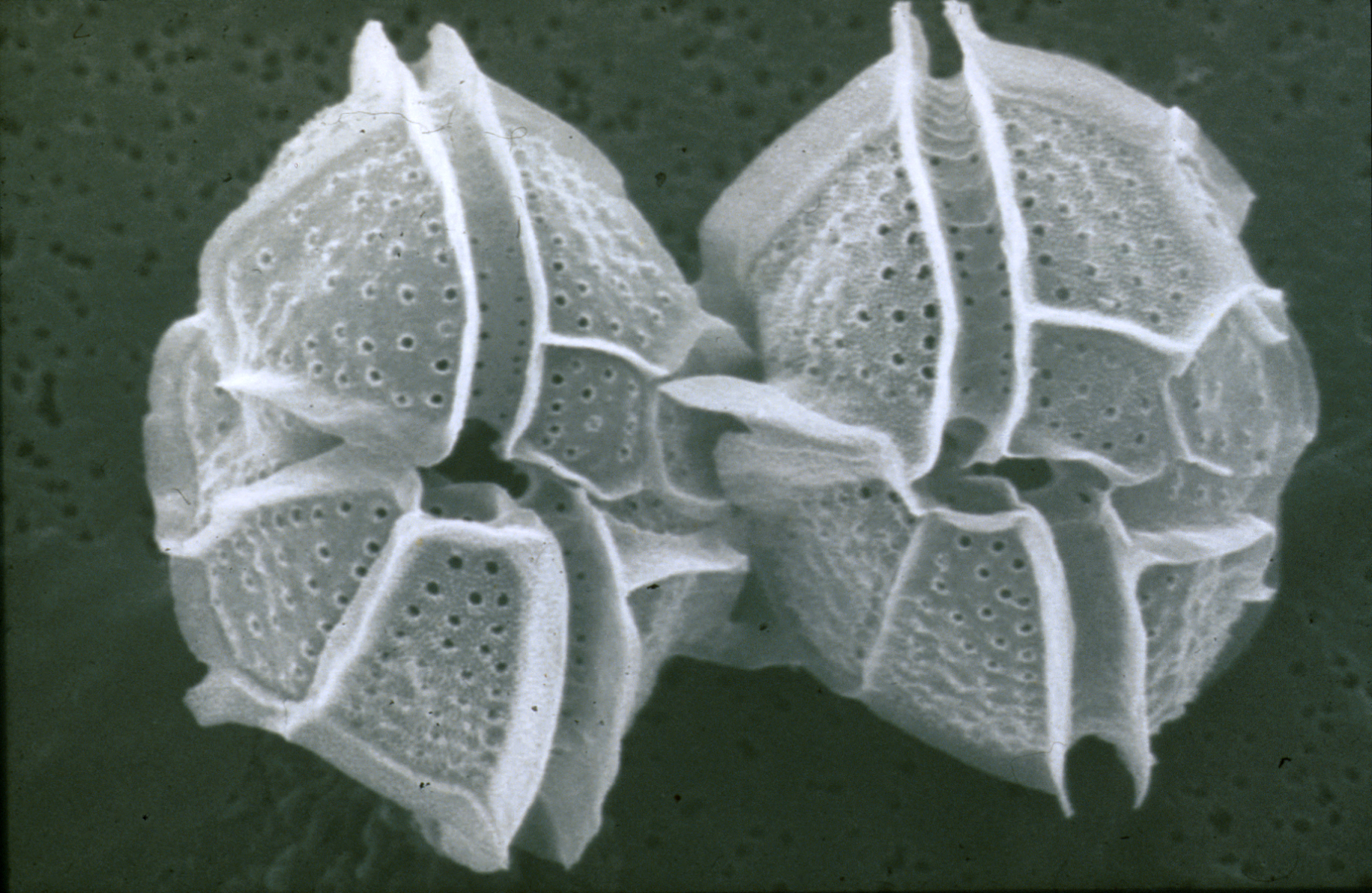
Dinoflagellates

Marine microbenthos are microorganisms that live in the benthic zone of the ocean – that is, near or on the seafloor, or within or on surface seafloor sediments. Microbenthos are found everywhere on or about the seafloor of continental shelves, as well as in deeper waters, with greater diversity in or on seafloor sediments. In photic zones benthic diatoms dominate as photosynthetic organisms. In intertidal zones changing tides strongly control opportunities for microbenthos.

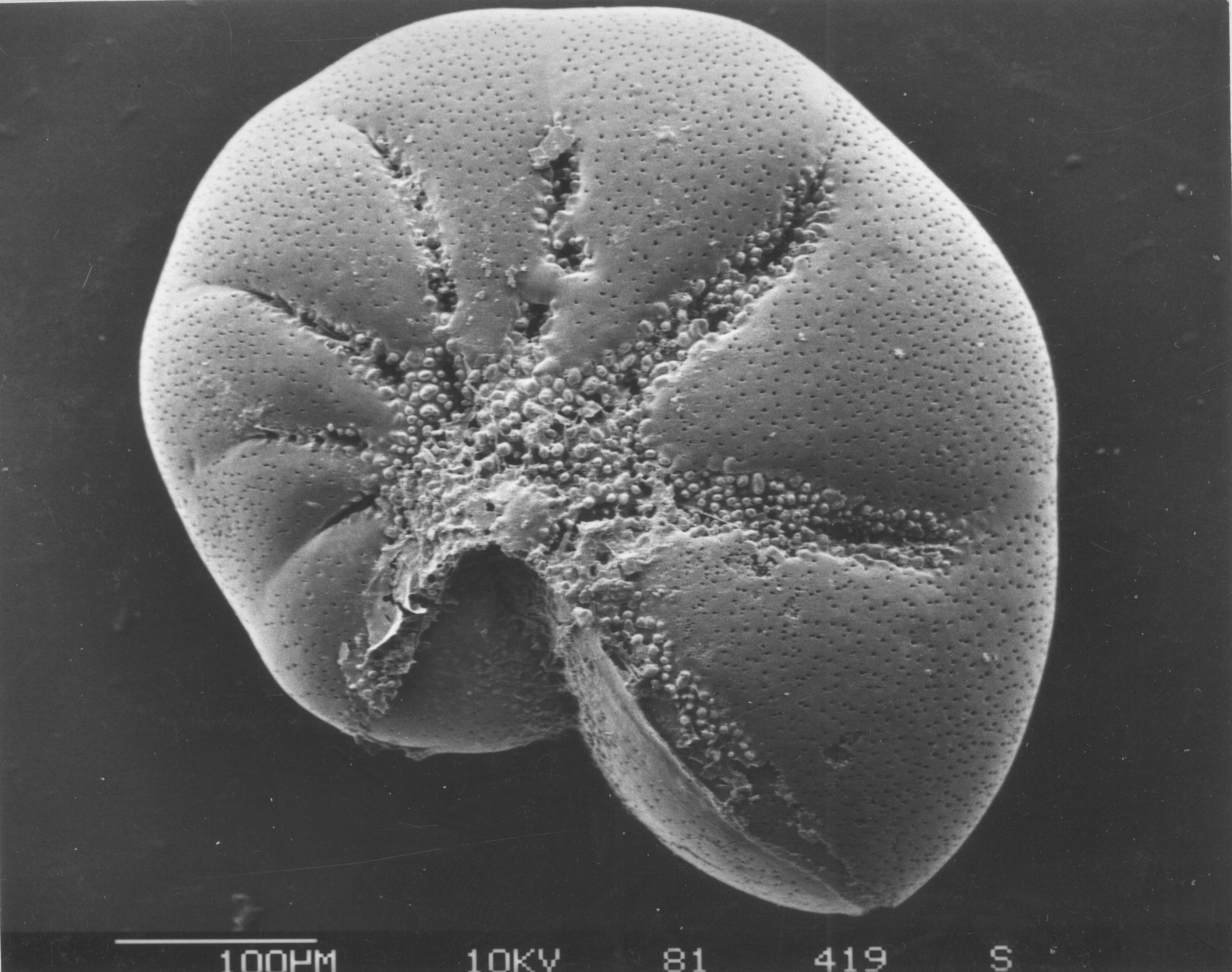
Elphidium a widespread abundant genus of benthic forams

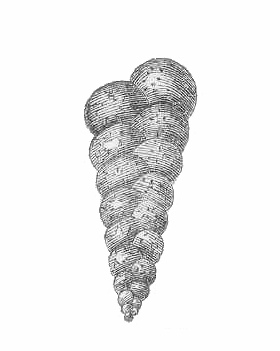
Heterohelix, an extinct genus of benthic forams
Marine microanimals

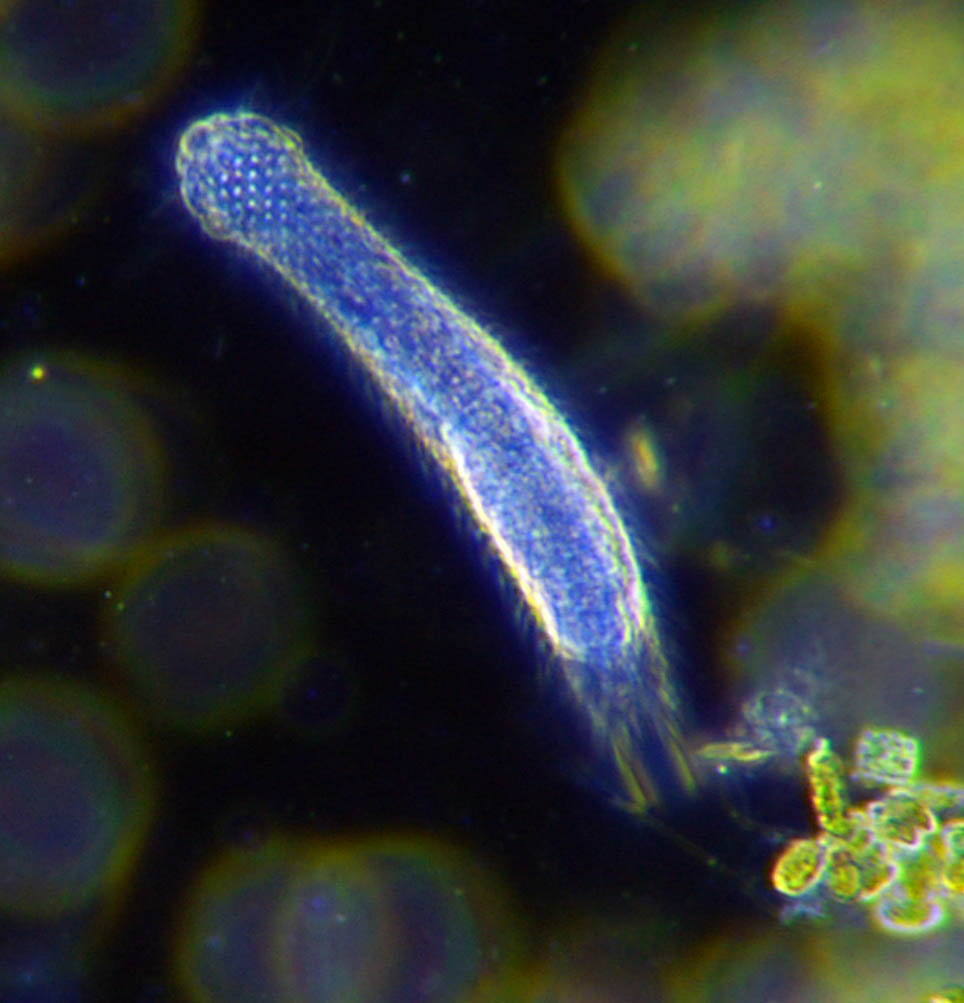
Darkfield photo of a gastrotrich, 0.06-3.0 mm long, a worm-like animal living between sediment particles

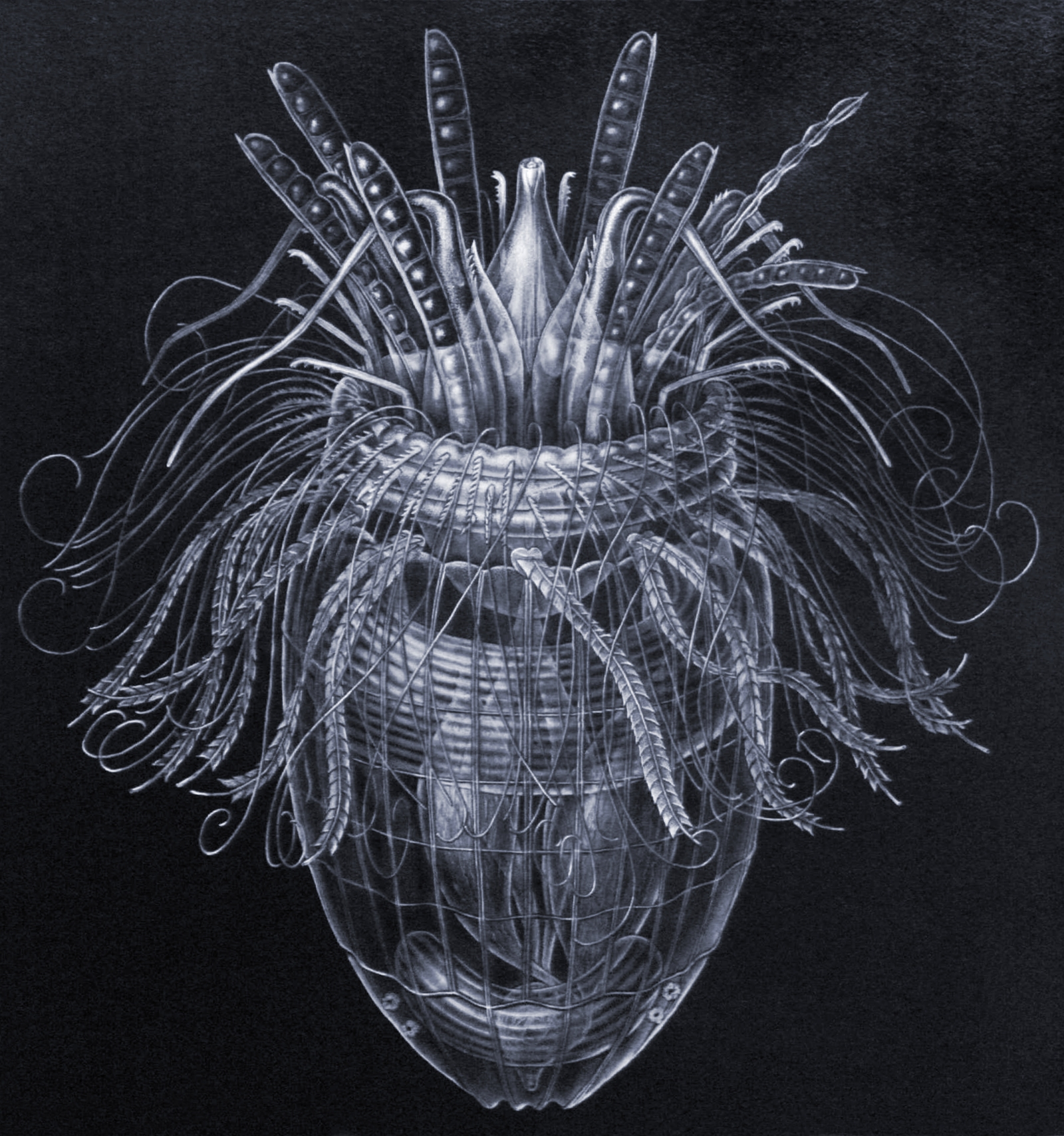
Armoured Pliciloricus enigmaticus, about 0.2 mm long, live in spaces between marine gravel

Both foraminifera and diatoms have planktonic and benthic forms, that is, they can drift in the water column or live on sediment at the bottom of the ocean. Regardless of form, their shells sink to the seafloor after they die. These shells are widely used as climate proxies. The chemical composition of the shells are a consequence of the chemical composition of the ocean at the time the shells were formed. Past water temperatures can be also be inferred from the ratios of stable oxygen isotopes in the shells, since lighter isotopes evaporate more readily in warmer water leaving the heavier isotopes in the shells. Information about past climates can be inferred further from the abundance of forams and diatoms, since they tend to be more abundant in warm water.

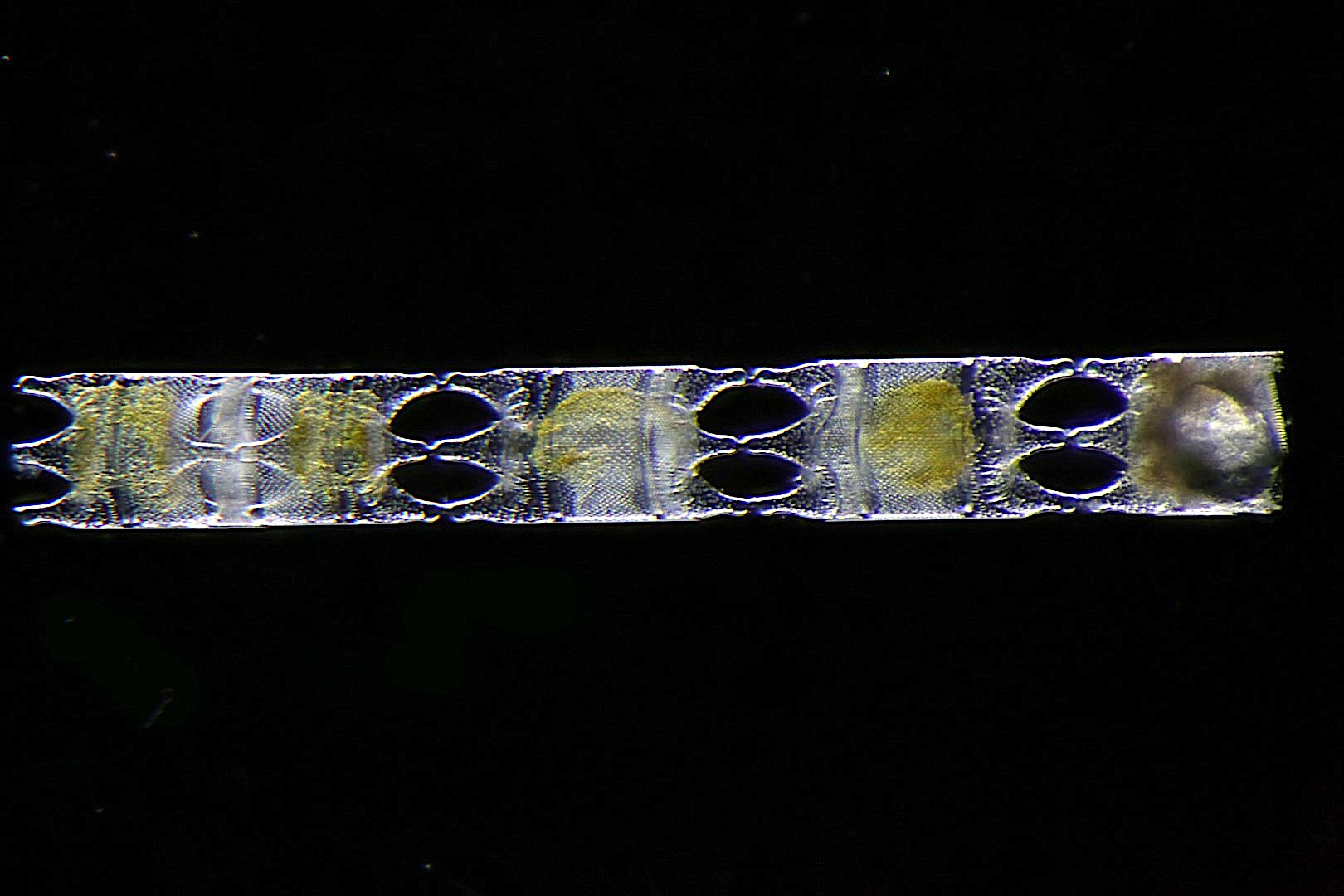
Benthic diatom

The sudden extinction event which killed the dinosaurs 66 million years ago also rendered extinct three-quarters of all other animal and plant species. However, deep-sea benthic forams flourished in the aftermath. In 2020 it was reported that researchers have examined the chemical composition of thousands of samples of these benthic forams and used their findings to build the most detailed climate record of Earth ever.

Some endoliths have extremely long lives. In 2013 researchers reported evidence of endoliths in the ocean floor, perhaps millions of years old, with a generation time of 10,000 years. These are slowly metabolizing and not in a dormant state. Some Actinomycetota found in Siberia are estimated to be half a million years old.

=== By trophic level ===
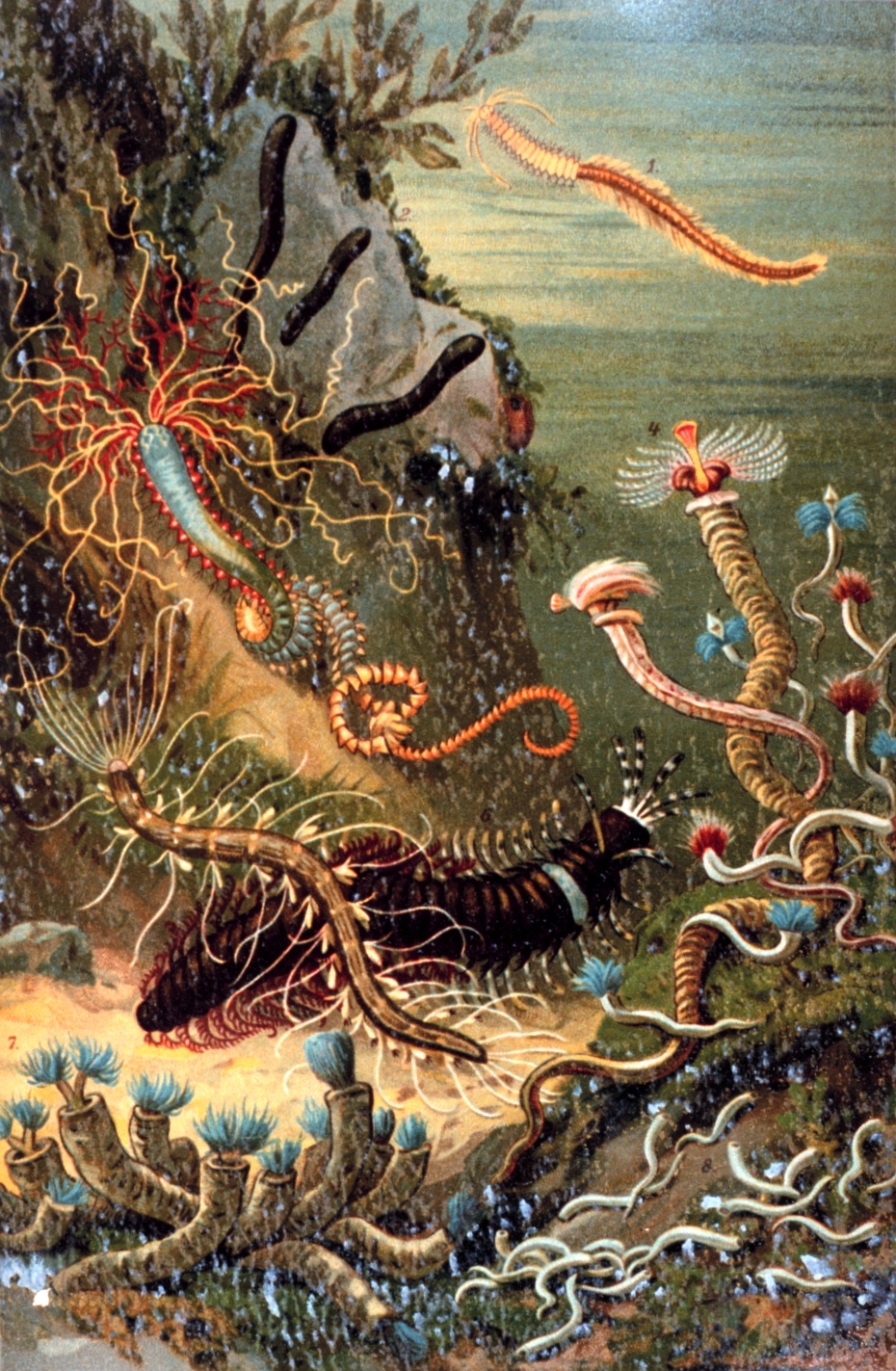
Example zoobenthos A variety of marine worms Plate from Das Meer by M. J. Schleiden (1804–1881)

==== Zoobenthos ====
Zoobenthos, prefix from Ancient Greek zôion 'animal', animals belonging to the benthos. Examples include polychaete worms, starfish and anemones.

==== Phytobenthos ====
Phytobenthos, prefix from Ancient Greek phutón 'plant', plants belonging to the benthos, mainly benthic diatoms and macroalgae (seaweed).

=== By location ===
==== Endobenthos ====
Endobenthos (or endobenthic), prefix from Ancient Greek éndon 'inner, internal', lives buried, or burrowing in the sediment, often in the oxygenated top layer, e.g., a sea pen or a sand dollar.

==== Epibenthos ====
Epibenthos (or epibenthic), prefix from Ancient Greek epí 'on top of', lives on top of the sediments, e.g., sea cucumber or a sea snail.

==== Hyperbenthos ====
Hyperbenthos (or hyperbenthic), prefix from Ancient Greek hupér 'over', lives just above the sediment, e.g., a rock cod.

=== By habitat ===
Modern seafloor mapping technologies have revealed linkages between seafloor geomorphology and benthic habitats, in which suites of benthic communities are associated with specific geomorphic settings. Examples include cold-water coral communities associated with seamounts and submarine canyons, kelp forests associated with inner shelf rocky reefs and rockfish associated with rocky escarpments on continental slopes. In oceanic environments, habitats can also be zoned by depth. From the shallowest to the deepest are: the epipelagic (less than 200 meters), the mesopelagic (200–1,000 meters), the bathyal (1,000–4,000 meters), the abyssal (4,000–6,000 meters) and the deepest, the hadal (below 6,000 meters).

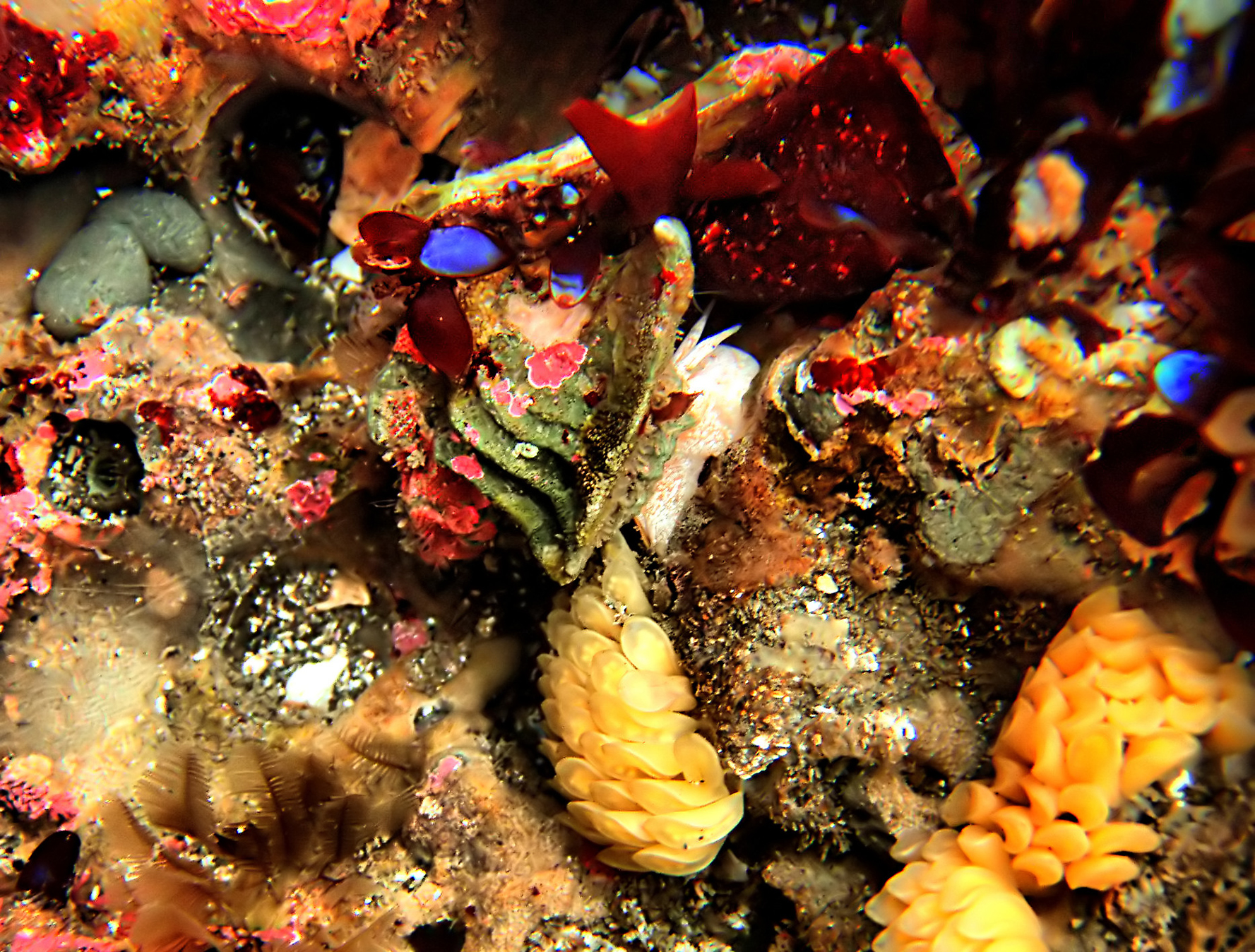
Low tide zone in a tide pool

Human impacts have occurred at all ocean depths, but are most significant on shallow continental shelf and slope habitats. Many benthic organisms have retained their historic evolutionary characteristics. Some organisms are significantly larger than their relatives living in shallower zones, largely because of higher oxygen concentration in deep water.

It is not easy to map or observe these organisms and their habitats, and most modern observations are made using remotely operated underwater vehicles (ROVs), and rarely crewed submersibles.

Tide pools provide somewhat demanding benthic homes for organisms such as sea stars, mussels and clams. Inhabitants deal with a frequently changing environment: fluctuations in water temperature, salinity, and oxygen content. Hazards include waves, strong currents, exposure to midday sun and predators. Waves can dislodge mussels and draw them out to sea. Gulls pick up and drop sea urchins to break them open. Sea stars prey on mussels and are eaten by gulls themselves. Black bears are known to sometimes feast on intertidal creatures at low tide. Although tide pool organisms must avoid getting washed away into the ocean, drying up in the sun, or being eaten, they depend on the tide pool's constant changes for food. Tide pools contain complex food webs that can vary based on the climate.

== Ecological roles ==
Effect of eutrophication on marine benthic life

=== Nutrient flux ===
Sources of food for benthic communities can derive from the water column above these habitats in the form of aggregations of detritus, inorganic matter, and living organisms. These aggregations are commonly referred to as marine snow, and are important for the deposition of organic matter, and bacterial communities. The amount of material sinking to the ocean floor can average 307,000 aggregates per m^{2} per day. This amount will vary on the depth of the benthos, and the degree of benthic-pelagic coupling. The benthos in a shallow region will have more available food than the benthos in the deep sea. Because of their reliance on it, microbes may become spatially dependent on detritus in the benthic zone. The microbes found in the benthic zone, specifically dinoflagellates and foraminifera, colonize quite rapidly on detritus matter while forming a symbiotic relationship with each other. In the deep sea, which covers 90–95% of the ocean floor, 90% of the total biomass is made up of prokaryotes. To release all the nutrients locked inside these microbes to the environment, viruses are important in making it available to other organisms.

The main food sources for the benthos are phytoplankton and organic detrital matter. In coastal locations, organic run off from land provides an additional food source. Meiofauna and bacteria consume and recycle organic matter in the sediments, playing an important role in returning nitrate and phosphate to the pelagic.

The depth of water, temperature and salinity, and type of local substrate all affect what benthos is present. In coastal waters and other places where light reaches the bottom, benthic photosynthesizing diatoms can proliferate. Filter feeders, such as sponges and bivalves, dominate hard, sandy bottoms. Deposit feeders, such as polychaetes, populate softer bottoms. Fish, such as dragonets, as well as sea stars, snails, cephalopods, and crustaceans are important predators and scavengers.

Benthic organisms, such as sea stars, oysters, clams, sea cucumbers, brittle stars and sea anemones, play an important role as a food source for fish, such as the California sheephead, and humans.

=== Carbon processing ===
Carbon processing in marine sediments

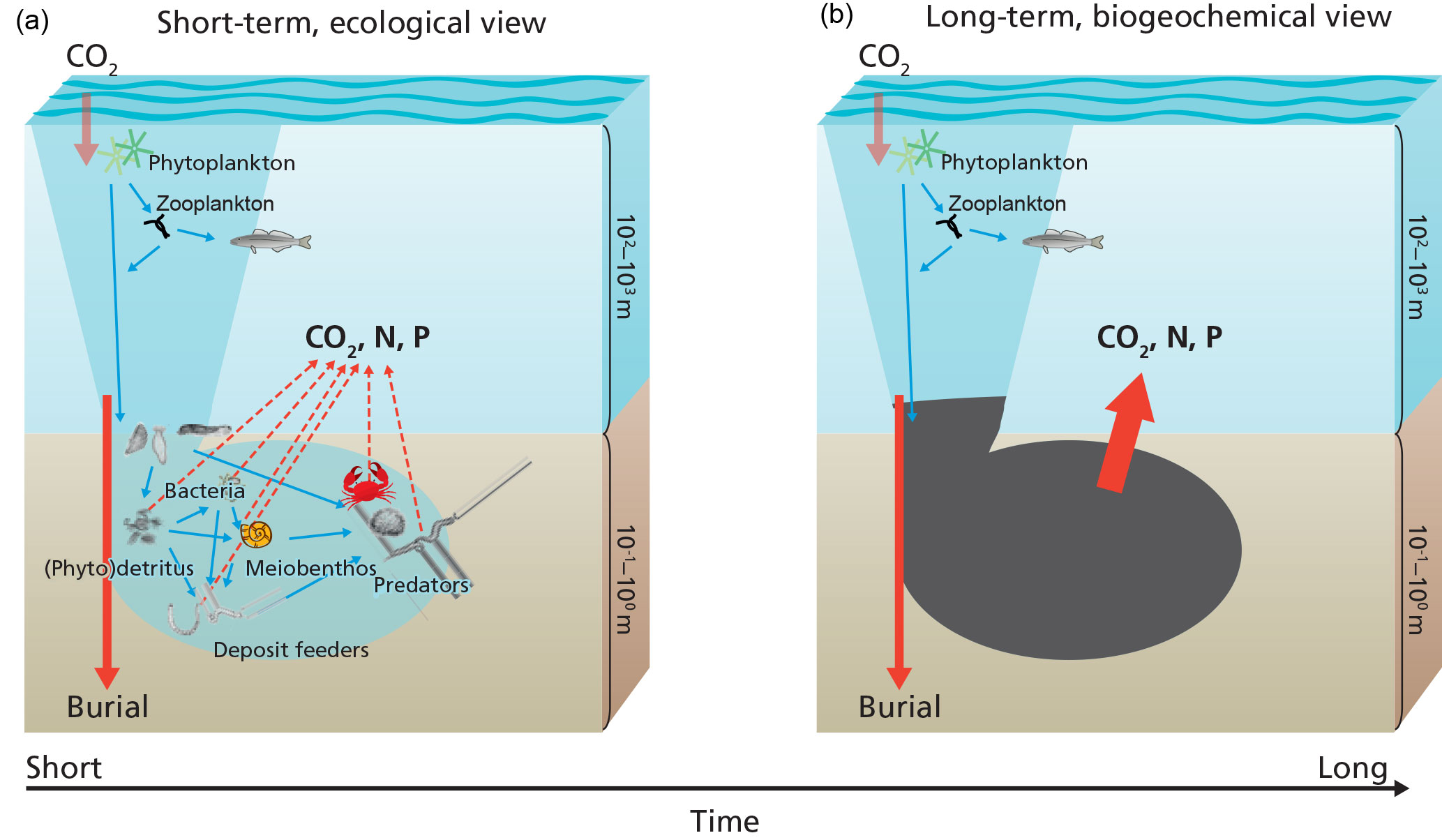

Organic matter produced in the sunlit layer of the ocean and delivered to the sediments is either consumed by organisms or buried. The organic matter consumed by organisms is used to synthesize biomass (i.e. growth) converted to carbon dioxide through respiration, or returned to the sediment as faeces. This cycle can occur many times before either all organic matter is used up or eventually buried. This process is known as the biological pump.

In the long-term or at steady-state (i.e., when the biomass of benthic organisms does not change), the benthic community can be considered a black box diverting organic matter into either metabolites or the geosphere (burial). The macrobenthos also indirectly impacts carbon cycling on the seafloor through bioturbation.

=== As bioindicators ===
Benthic macro-invertebrates play a critical role in aquatic ecosystems. These organisms can be used to indicate the presence, concentration, and effect of water pollutants in the aquatic environment. Some water contaminants—such as nutrients, chemicals from surface runoff, and metals—settle in the sediment of river beds, where many benthos reside. Benthos are highly sensitive to contamination, so their close proximity to high pollutant concentrations make these organisms ideal for studying water contamination.

Benthos can be used as bioindicators of water pollution through ecological population assessments or through analyzing biomarkers. In ecological population assessments, a relative value of water pollution can be detected. Observing the number and diversity of macro-invertebrates in a waterbody can indicate the pollution level. In highly contaminated waters, a reduced number of organisms and only pollution-tolerant species will be found. In biomarker assessments, quantitative data can be collected on the amount of and direct effect of specific pollutants in a waterbody. The biochemical response of macro-invertebrates' internal tissues can be studied extensively in the laboratory. The concentration of a chemical can cause many changes, including changing feeding behaviors, inflammation, and genetic damage, effects that can be detected outside of the stream environment. Biomarker analysis is important for mitigating the negative impacts of water pollution because it can detect water pollution before it has a noticeable ecological effect on benthos populations.

=== Other research ===
Benthic macroinvertebrates have many important ecological functions, such as regulating the flow of materials and energy in river ecosystems through their food web linkages. Because of this correlation between flow of energy and nutrients, benthic macroinvertebrates have the ability to influence food resources on fish and other organisms in aquatic ecosystems. For example, the addition of a moderate amount of nutrients to a river over the course of several years resulted in increases in invertebrate richness, abundance, and biomass. These in turn resulted in increased food resources for native species of fish with insignificant alteration of the macroinvertebrate community structure and trophic pathways. The presence of macroinvertebrates such as Amphipoda also affect the dominance of certain types of algae in Benthic ecosystems as well. In addition, because benthic zones are influenced by the flow of dead organic material, there have been studies conducted on the relationship between stream and river water flows and the resulting effects on the benthic zone. Low flow events show a restriction in nutrient transport from benthic substrates to food webs, and caused a decrease in benthic macroinvertebrate biomass, which lead to the disappearance of food sources into the substrate.

Because the benthic system regulates energy in aquatic ecosystems, studies have been made of the mechanisms of the benthic zone in order to better understand the ecosystem. Benthic diatoms have been used by the European Union's Water Framework Directive (WFD) to establish ecological quality ratios that determined the ecological status of lakes in the UK. Beginning research is being made on benthic assemblages to see if they can be used as indicators of healthy aquatic ecosystems. Benthic assemblages in urbanized coastal regions are not functionally equivalent to benthic assemblages in untouched regions.

Ecologists are attempting to understand the relationship between heterogeneity and maintaining biodiversity in aquatic ecosystems. Benthic algae has been used as an inherently good subject for studying short term changes and community responses to heterogeneous conditions in streams. Understanding the potential mechanisms involving benthic periphyton and the effects on heterogeneity within a stream may provide a better understanding of the structure and function of stream ecosystems. Periphyton populations suffer from high natural spatial variability while difficult accessibility simultaneously limits the practicable number of samples that can be taken. Targeting periphyton locations which are known to provide reliable samples – especially hard surfaces – is recommended in the European Union benthic monitoring program (by Kelly 1998 for the United Kingdom then in the EU and for the EU as a whole by CEN 2003 and CEN 2004) and in some United States programs (by Moulton et al. 2002). Benthic gross primary production (GPP) may be important in maintaining biodiversity hotspots in littoral zones in large lake ecosystems. However, the relative contributions of benthic habitats within specific ecosystems are poorly explored and more research is planned.

== Threats and mitigation ==
Benthos are negatively impacted by fishing, pollution and litter, deep-sea mining, oil and gas activities, tourism, shipping, invasive species, climate change (and its impacts such as ocean acidification, ocean warming and changes to ocean circulation) and construction such as coastal development, undersea cables, and wind farm construction.

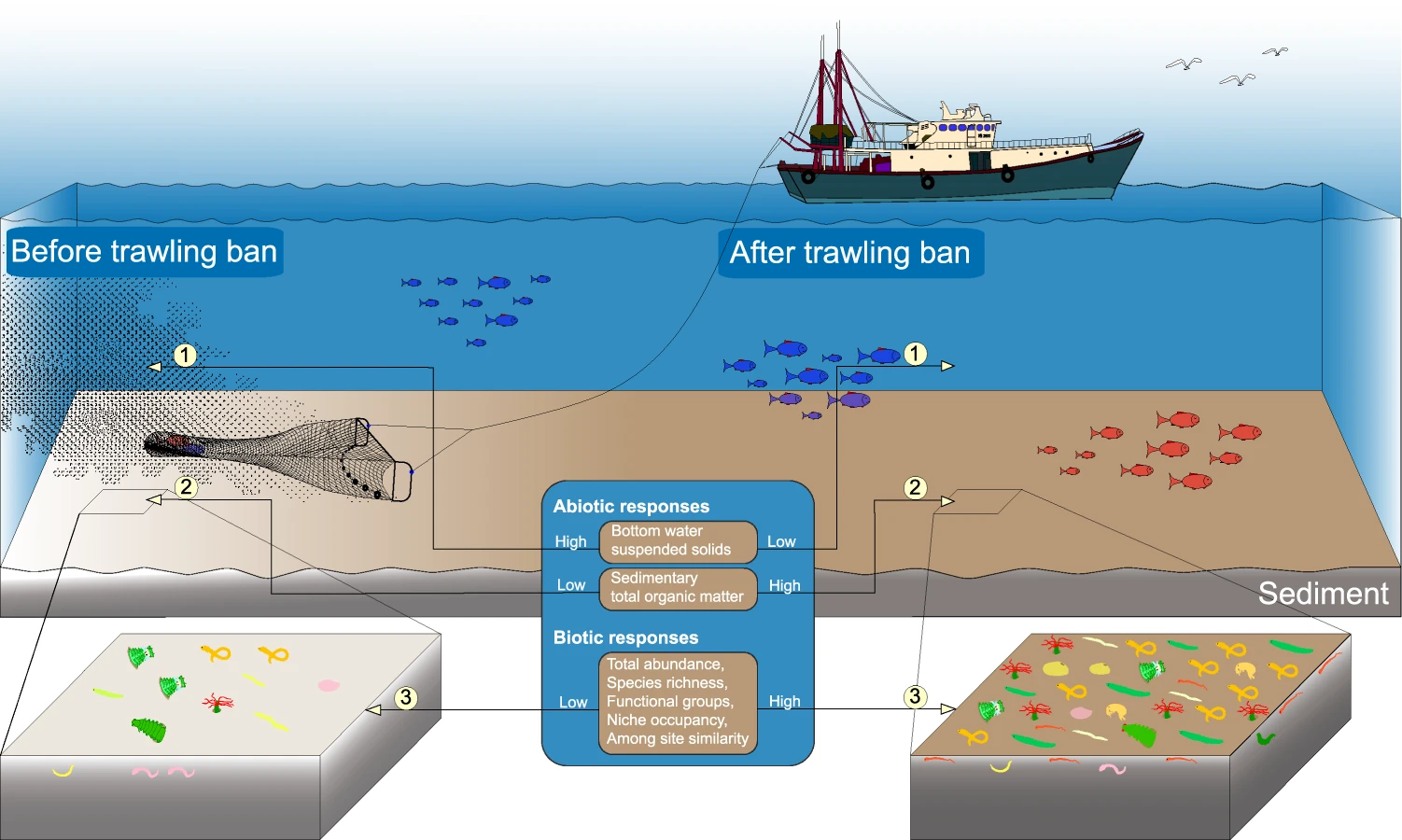
Abiotic and biotic responses to a territory-wide trawl ban in Hong Kong waters. Abiotic responses: (1) lower bottom water suspended-solid loads, (2) higher sedimentary organic contents; and biotic responses include: (3) higher site-based abundance, species richness, functional diversity, niche occupancy and among-site similarity of macrobenthos.

Bottom trawling accounts for roughly 25% of global capture fisheries. It has increasingly been recognized as a non-sustainable fishing practice. It impacts benthic ecosystems in two ways. First, fishing gear disrupts epibenthic sediments, resulting in the loss of habitat complexity and resuspension of sediments into the water column, reducing the sedimentary organic-matter content, and increasing turbidity and biochemical oxygen demand in the water column. Second, trawling disrupts benthic community structure, selectively removing large-bodied target and non-target species, which are usually K-selected, resulting in a community dominated by relatively small r-selected species. Given the significance of these impacts, a number of countries have implemented total or partial bans on bottom trawling within their territorial waters or in the international waters they manage.

== See also ==
- Armor (hydrology)
- Benthic fish
- Benthopelagic fish
- Bioirrigation
- Bottom trawling
- Deep sea
- Deep sea communities
- Deep sea mining
- Demersal fish
- Epibenthic sled
- Intertidal ecology
- Littoral
- Plankton
- Pelagic zone
- Photic zone
- Sediment Profile Imagery (SPI)
- Stream bed
