= Van Veen grab sampler =

Instrument to sample sediment in water environments

Closed Van Veen grab sampler

The Van Veen grab sampler is an instrument to sample sediment in water environments. Usually it is a clamshell bucket made of stainless steel. Up to 20 cm deep samples of roughly 0.1 m^{2} can be extracted with this instrument. It can be light-weight (roughly 5 kg) and low-tech. The smallest version even fits into hand luggage. The sampler was invented by Johan van Veen (a Dutch engineer) in 1933.

A draw-back of the use of this sampler is that it tends to disturb the sediments more than a box corer does.

== Mechanism ==
While letting the instrument down into the water, the two levers with buckets at their ends are spread like open scissors. The levers are locked in this position, and unlocked on hitting the ground. When the rope is pulled upward again, the two buckets close and grab a sample from the sea floor.

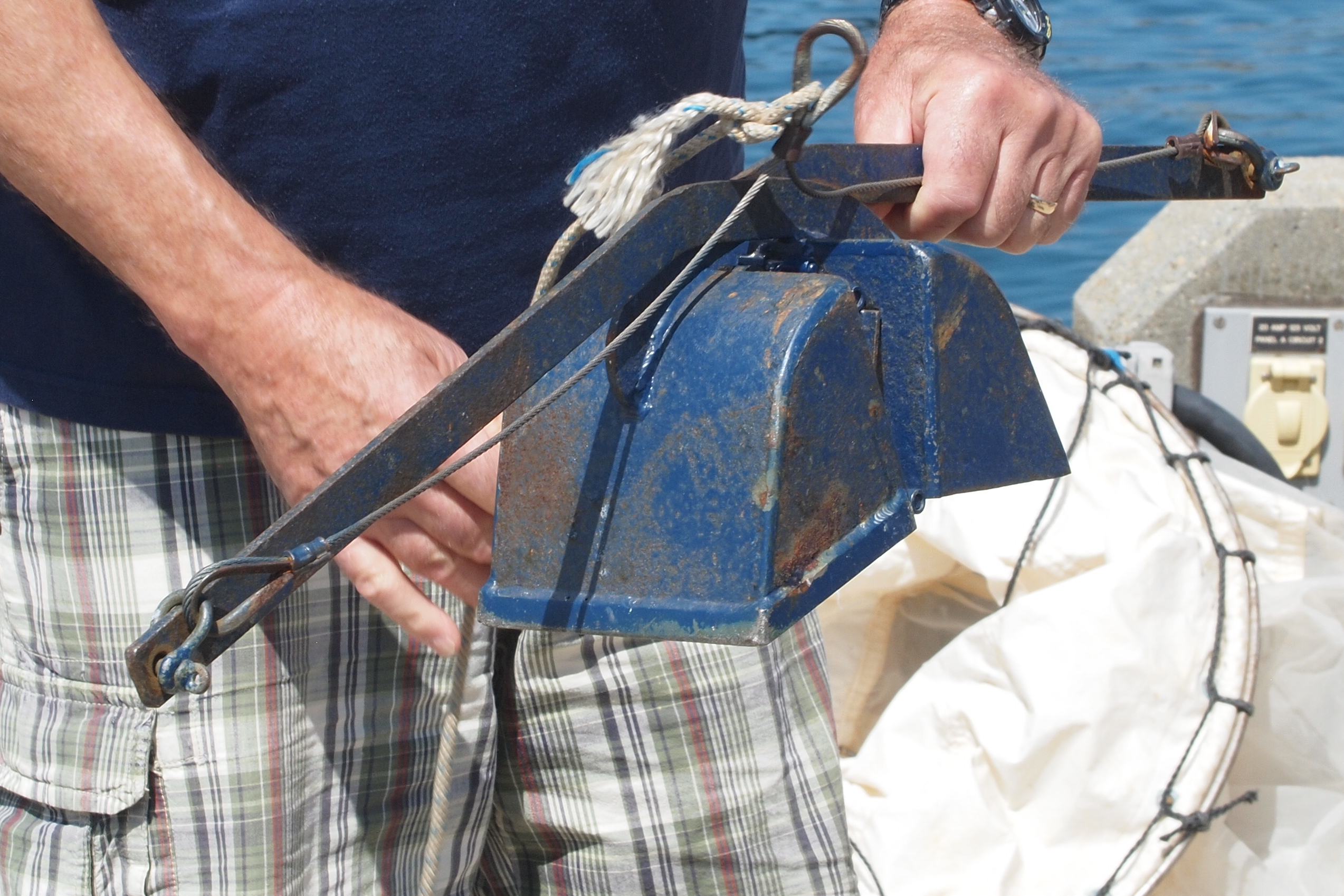
Van Veen grab when it is locked, ready to be lowered to the floor

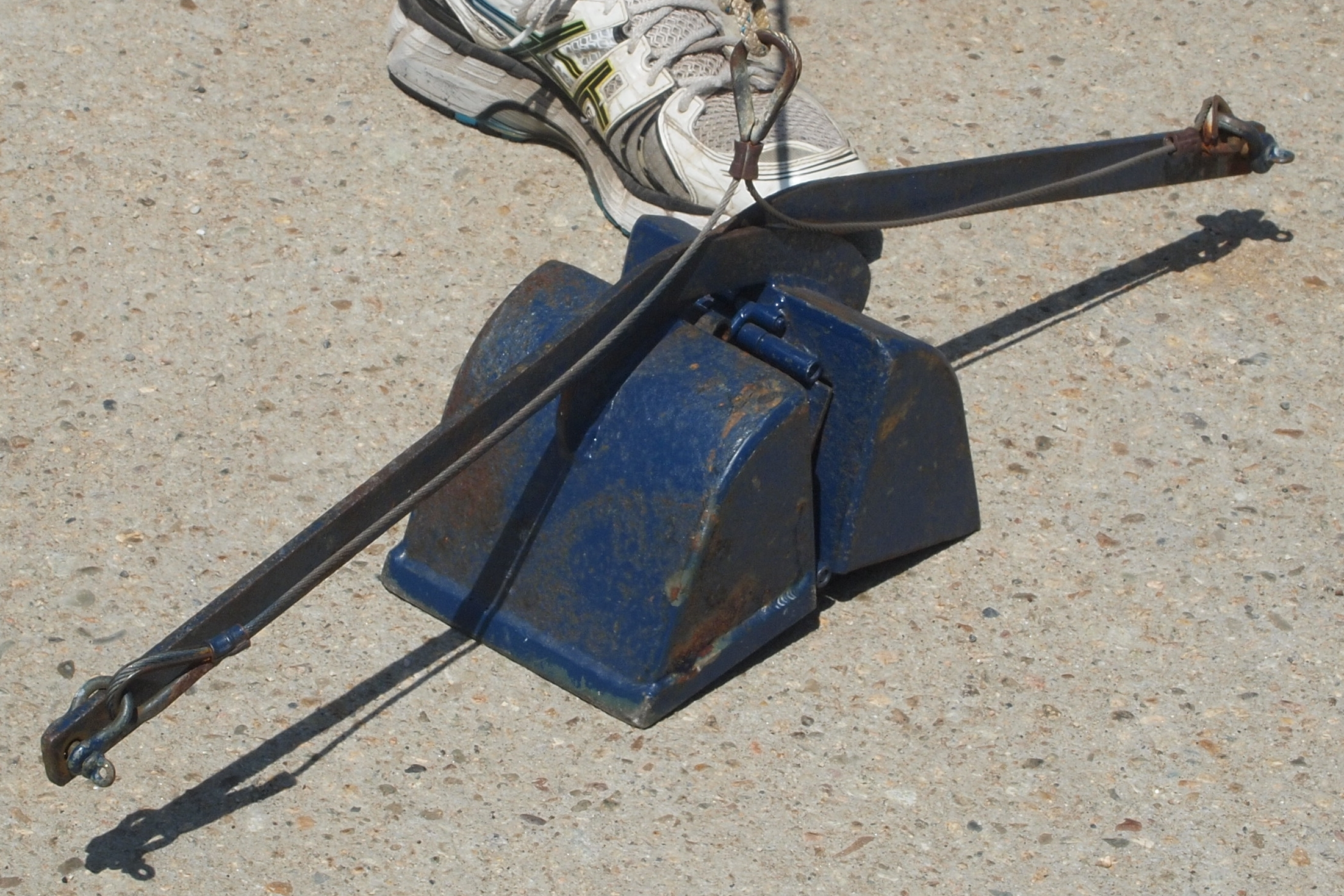
It is now unlocked after hitting the floor, ready to collect sediment

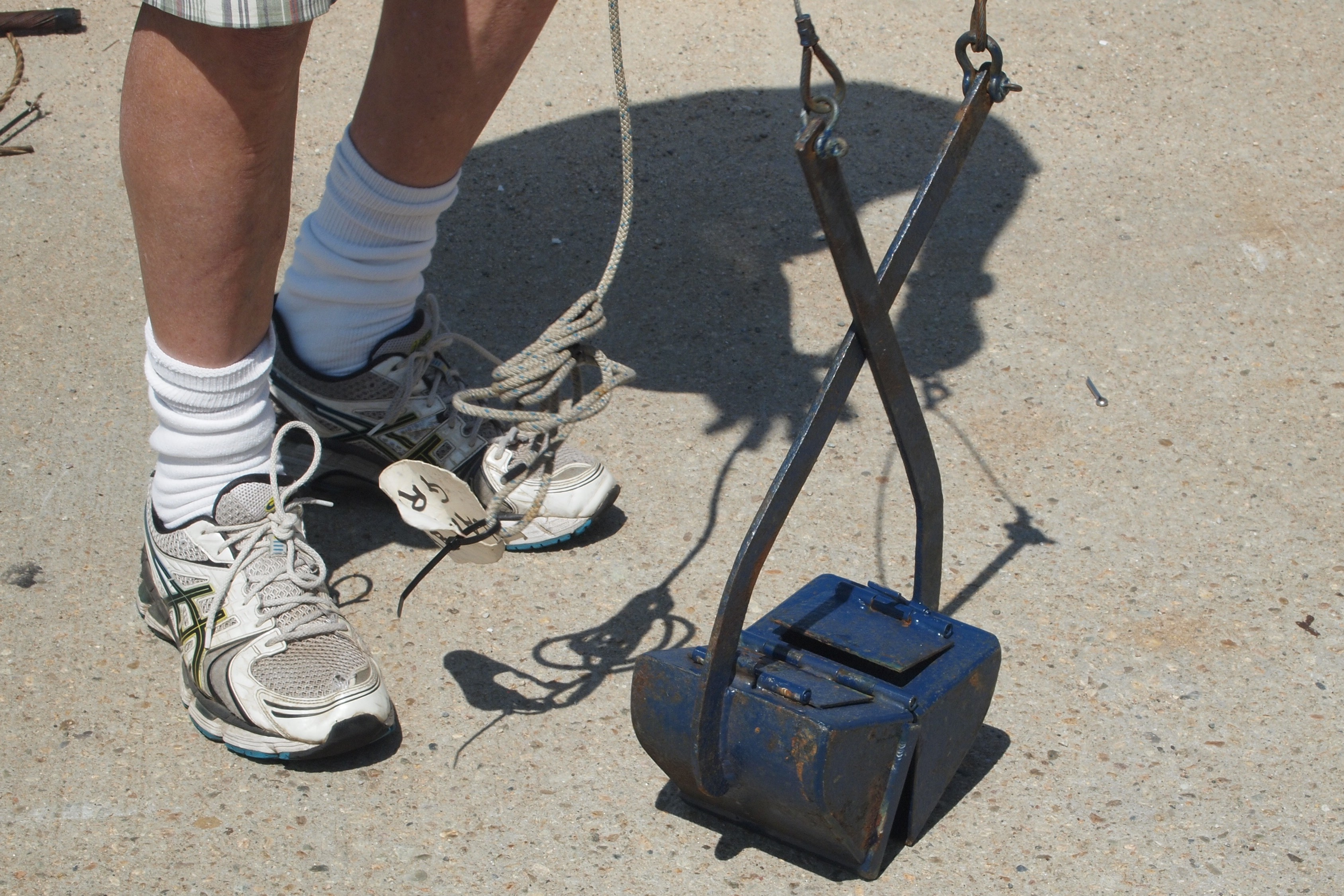
When lifting it after unlocked, the jaws will close to collect sediment inside

Three small technical changes lead to variations with more mechanical parts or structure:

- The Ekman grab sampler does not close the shovels instantly on ground contact, but a messenger weight has to be sent down in order to release springs and take the sample.
- The Ponar type sampler is modified also and has additional springs which are released upon bottom contact which might be helpful for harder surfaces.
- The Young modified grab sampler includes a metal frame for additional stability.

== See also ==
- Epibenthic sled
