= Box corer =

Marine geological sampling tool for soft sediments

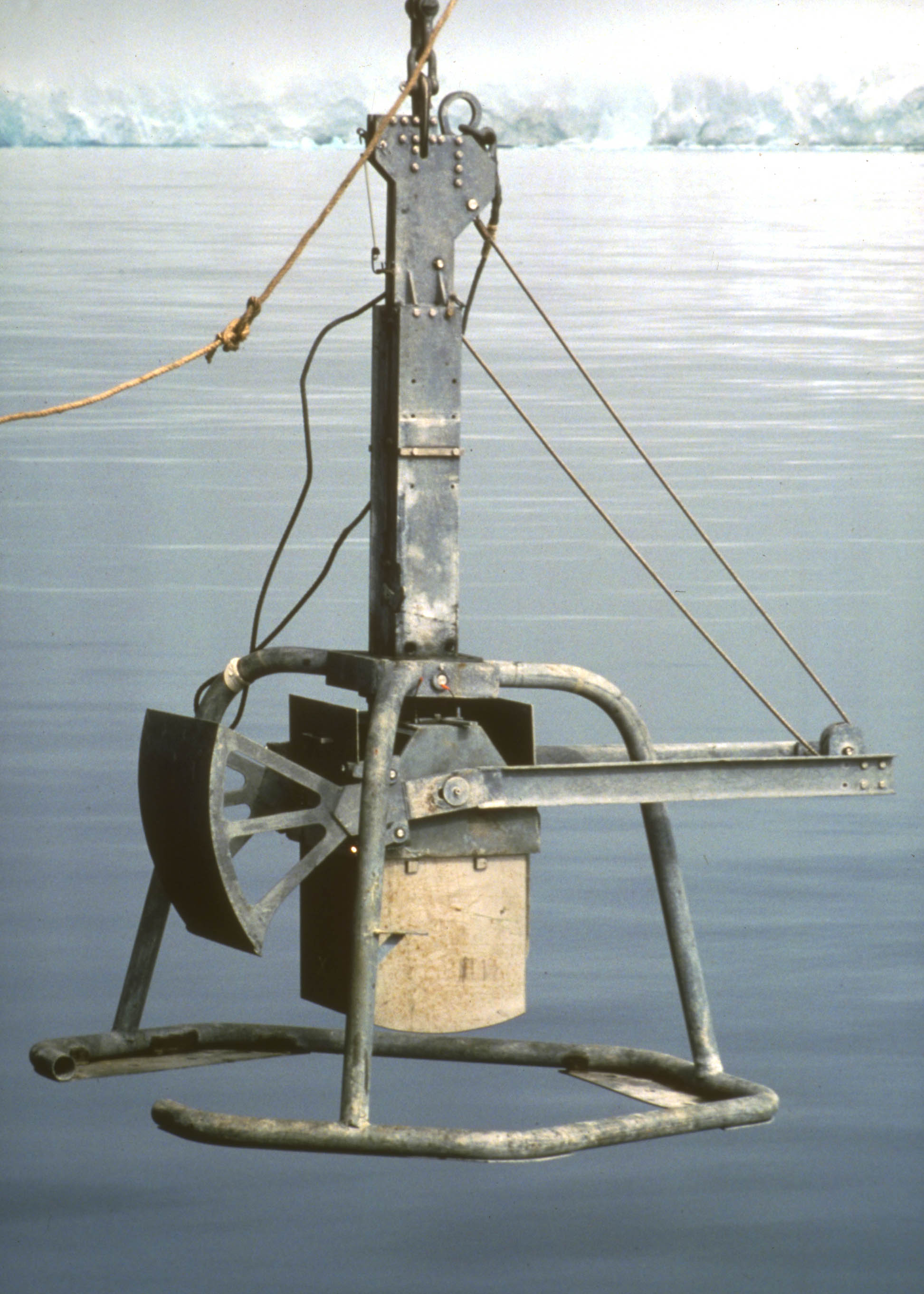
Box corer (2,500 cm^{2} area)

The box corer is a marine geological sampling tool for soft sediments in lakes or oceans. It is deployed from a research vessel with a wire and suitable for any water depth. It is designed for a minimum of disturbance of the sediment surface by bow wave effects which is important for quantitative investigations of the benthic micro- to macrofauna, geochemical processes, sampling of bottom water or sedimentology.

== Construction ==
The surface area of the box ranges between 200 cm^{2} and a quarter of a square meter (50x50 cm = 2,500 cm^{2}); the penetration depth of 0.5 m can be controlled to prevent over-penetration in softer sediments. It allows for large sample sizes which optimizes deployment time and can satisfy sample requests for various investigations.

== Procedure ==
The box is fixed at the lower end of a large plunger. To deploy the box corer an "A"-frame or a sliding beam with at least 3 m clearance is required. The corer is lowered vertically until it impacts the seabed. At this point the instrument is triggered by a trip as the main coring stem passes through its frame. The stem has a weight of up to 800 kg to aid penetration. While pulling the corer out of the sediment a spade swings underneath the sample to prevent loss. When hauled back on board, the spade is under the box.

The recovered sample is completely enclosed after sampling, reducing the loss of finer materials during recovery. Stainless steel doors, kept open during the deployment to reduce any "bow-wave effect" during sampling, are triggered on sampling and remain tightly closed, sealing the sampled water from that of the water column. On recovery, the sample can be processed directly through the large access doors or via the removal of the box completely, together with its cutting blade. A spare box and spade can then be added, ready for an immediate redeployment. The sampling box is made from stainless steel, the cutting blade as well as the corer are galvanised for reduced contamination and corrosion. It can quickly be exchanged and moved by a hand lift for convenient sampling. One side might be unscrewed for documentation and convenient sampling of the profile.

== Alternative methods ==
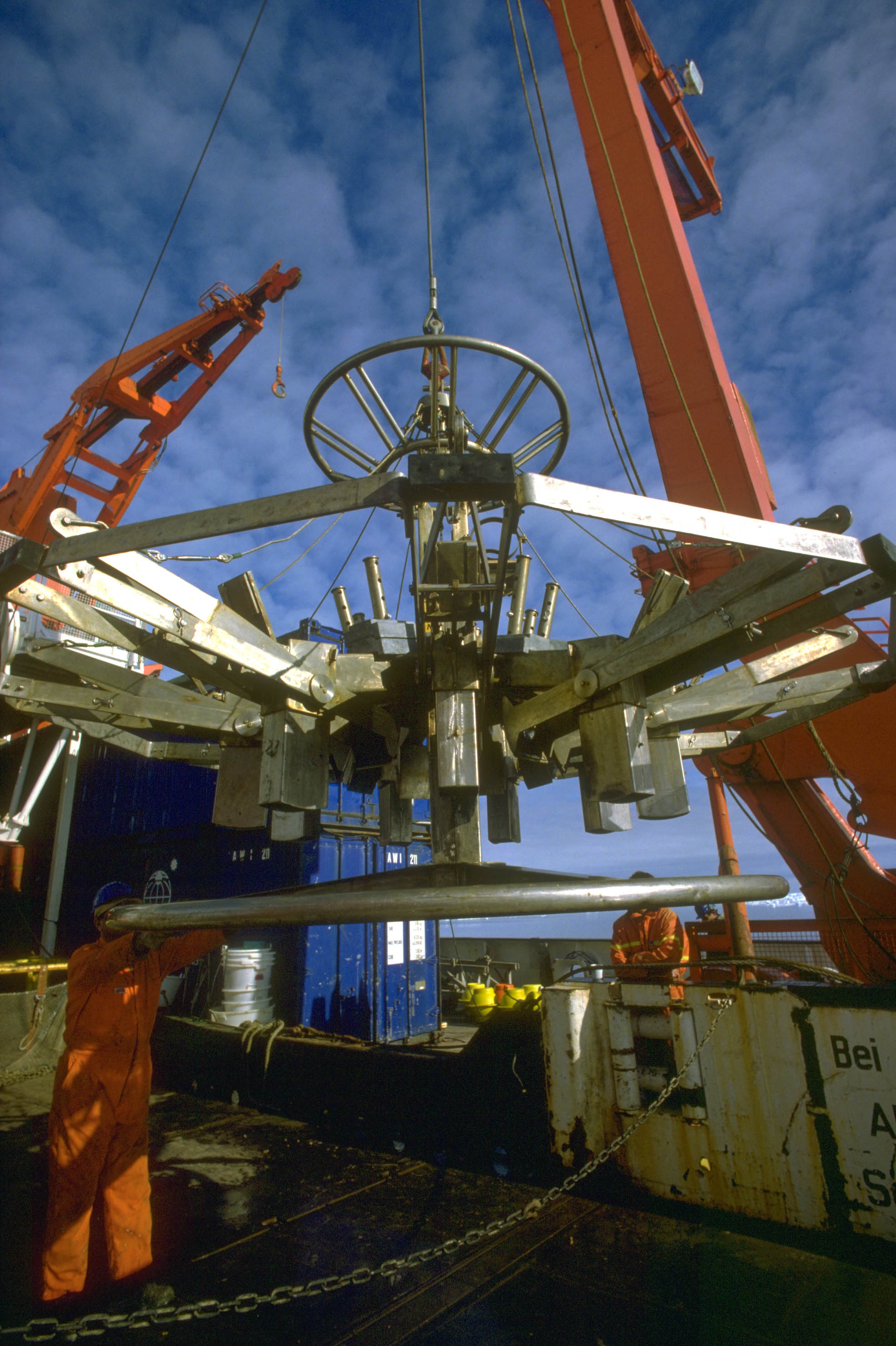
Multi-Box Corer

The box corer underwent many alternative development with the advantages of other closing mechanisms, multiple sampling, and modest weight, size and cost (e.g. GOMEX box corer, Multi-Box Corer). The final version of the widely accepted (large) box corer has been used since the 1980s on research vessels around the world. It originates from the Reineck box corer and the USNEL box corer. The device was developed by R. Hessler, Professor of Biological Oceanography, and P.A. Jumars at the Scripps Institution of Oceanography in collaboration with the United States Naval Electronic Laboratory (USNEL) in San Diego to determine the faunal composition at the abyssal floor. Simple predecessors of devices to take sediment samples from vessels which are still in use (e.g. in studies of freshwater sediments and benthic communities) include the Van Veen Grab Sampler and the Ponar grab. These devices have a variable penetration depth that depends on the type of sediment.

== Gallery ==
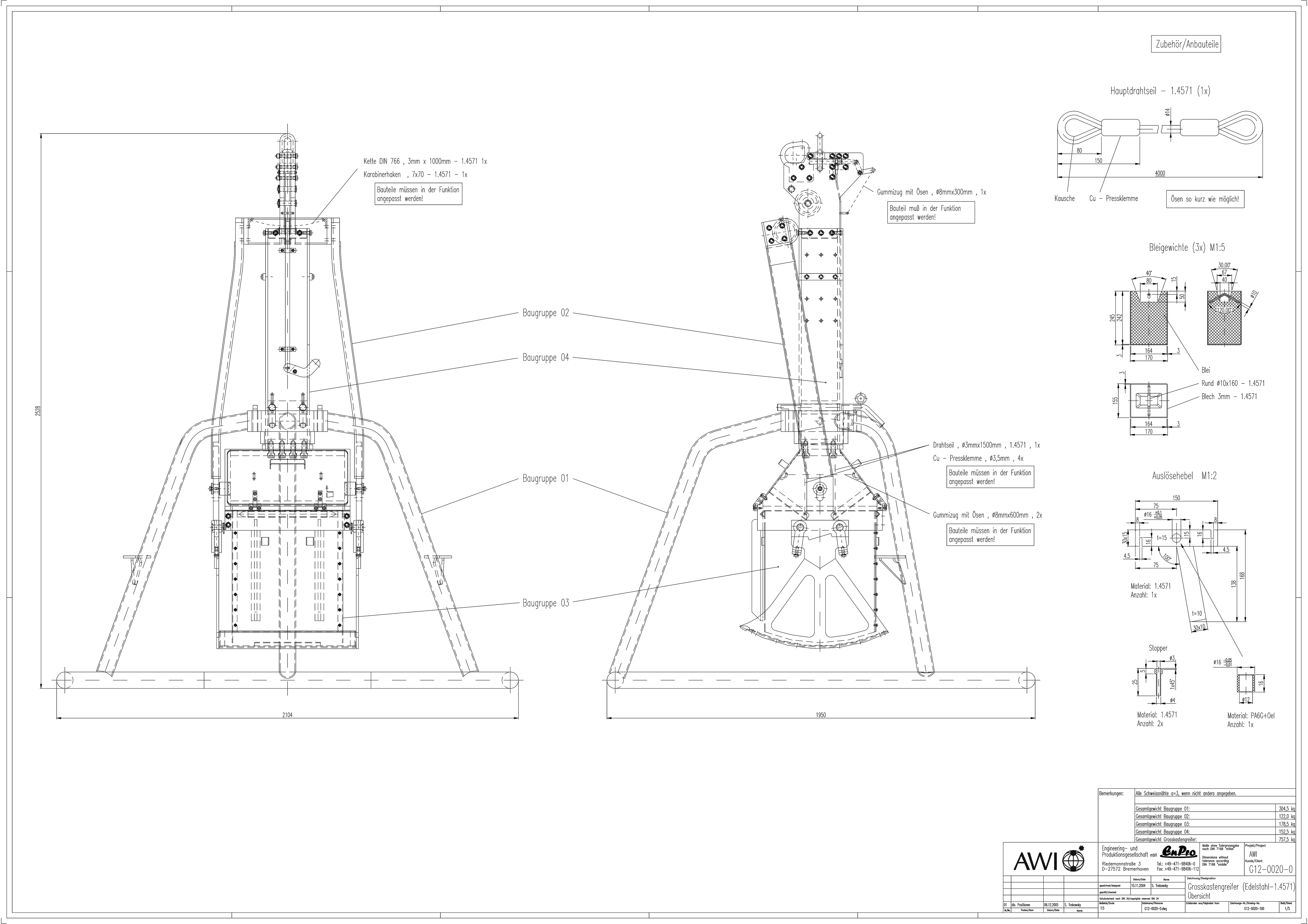
Engineering drawing

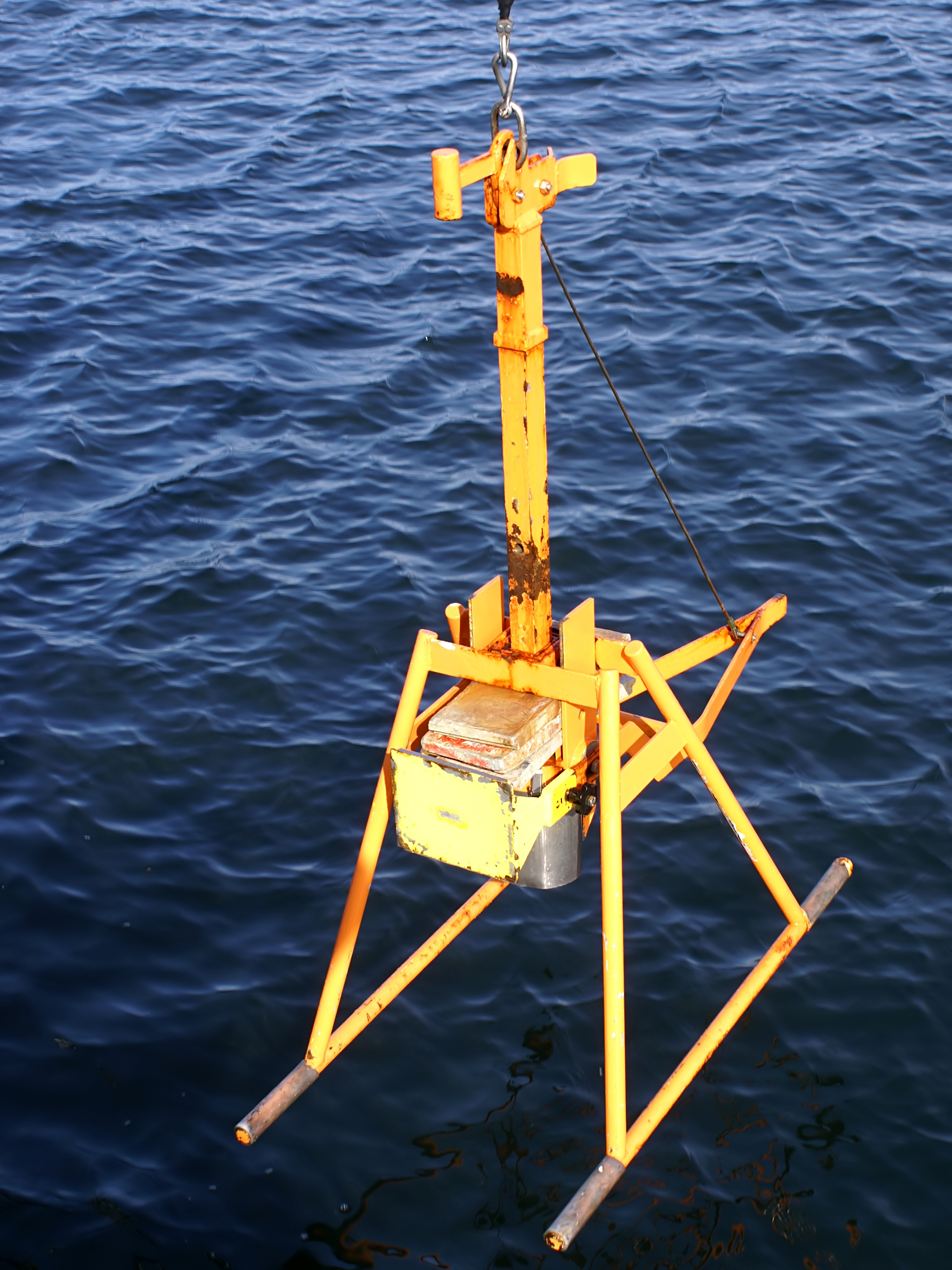
Reineck box corer

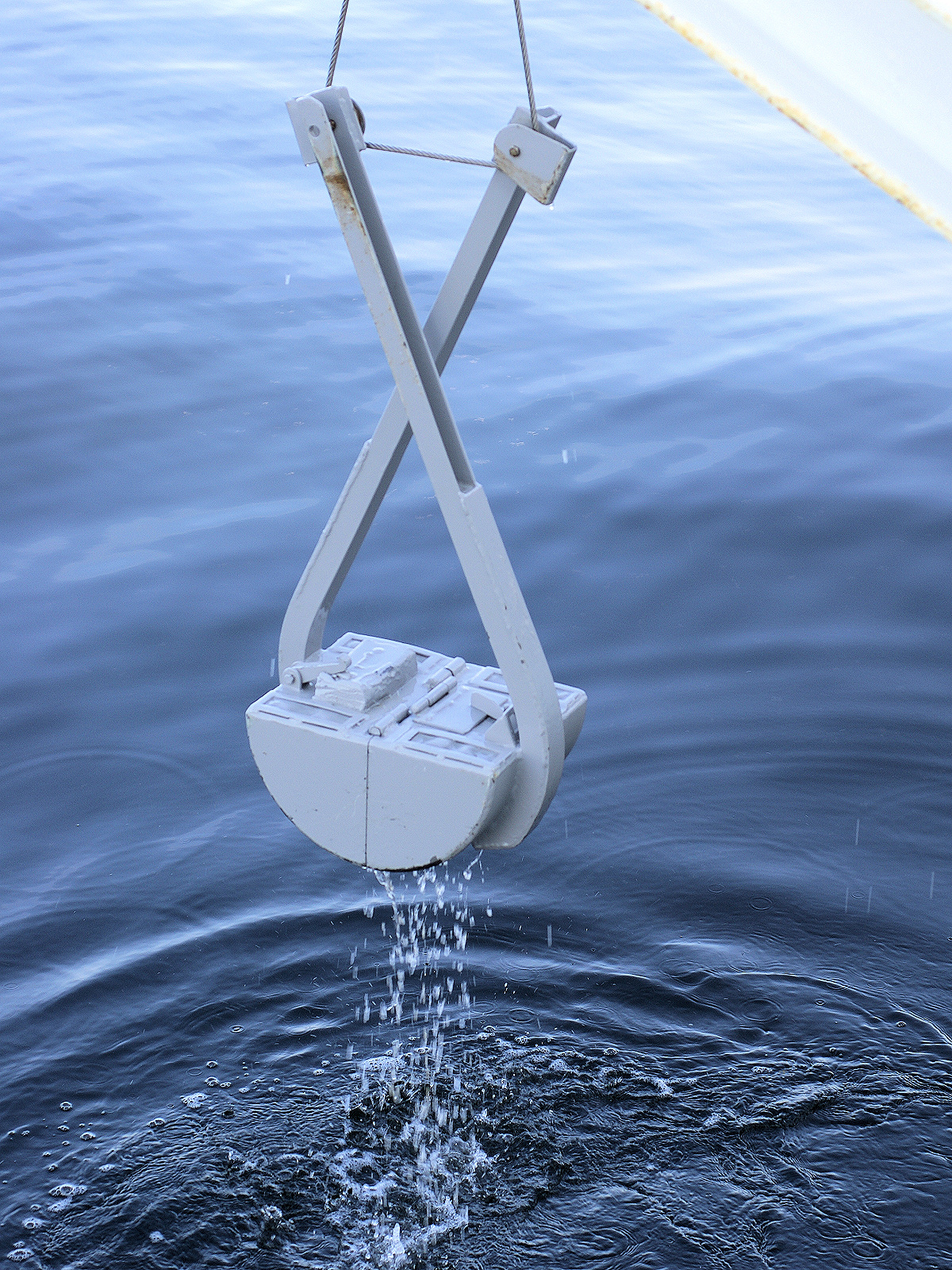
Van Veen grab
