= Bean (name) =

Bean or Beans is a given name, Scottish surname and nickname.

== People with surname Bean ==
=== Actors ===
- Sean Bean (born 1959), English actor
- Orson Bean (1928–2020), American actor
- Shoshana Bean (born 1977), American stage actress, singer and songwriter

=== Athletes ===
- Andy Bean (golfer) (1953–2023), American golfer
- Billy Bean (1964–2024), American baseball player
- Colter Bean (born 1977), American baseball player
- George Bean (cricketer) (1864–1923), English cricketer
- Jake Bean (born 1998), Canadian ice hockey player
- Jason Bean (American football) (born 1999), American football player
- Justin Bean (born 1996), American basketball player
- Joe Bean (1874–1961), American baseball player
- Marcus Bean (born 1984), English footballer
- Scott Bean (born 1976), Zimbabwean cricketer

=== Politicians ===
- James Bean (1933–2013), American politician
- Jason Bean (politician) American politician, Missouri senator
- John Bean (politician) (1927–2021), British far-right-wing figure
- Joshua Bean (c.1818–1852), American politician
- Melissa Bean (born 1962), American politician
- Samuel C. Bean (c.1819–1870), Wisconsin politician

=== Scientists ===
- Alan Bean (1932–2018), NASA astronaut from the Apollo era
- Barton Appler Bean (1860–1947), American ichthyologist, brother of Tarleton Hoffman Bean
- Charles Bean (1879–1968), Australian historian
- Charlie Bean (born 1953), British economist
- Tarleton Hoffman Bean (1846–1916), American ichthyologist, brother of Barton Appler Bean
- William Bennett Bean (1909–1989), American medical historian and teacher
- William Jackson Bean (1863–1947), botanist

=== Other people ===
- Anne Bean (born 1950), British installation and performance artist
- Bennett Bean (born 1941), American ceramics artist
- George "G. T." Bean, of Bean Brothers, Australian businessman
- Gerlin Bean (1940–2025), Jamaican community worker
- Hugh Bean (1929–2003), English violinist
- Isabelle Bean (1862 – 1939), an Australian nurse, theosophist and feminist
- Jazmin Bean (born 2003), English singer, songwriter, and makeup artist
- Joel Bean (1825–1914), American Quaker
- John Bean (cinematographer) (1963–2011), Australian cinematographer
- John William Bean (1824–1882), British criminal who attempted to assassinate Queen Victoria
- Jonathan Bean (cricketer) (born 1964), English cricketer
- Jonathan Bean (born 1979), American children's book illustrator
- Laura Schiff Bean, American artist
- Louis H. Bean (1896–1994), American economic and political analyst
- Maurice Darrow Bean (1928–2009), American diplomat
- Mollie Bean, soldier for the Confederate Army
- Roy Bean (c. 1825–1903), Wild West figure
- Sawney Bean, notorious clan leader of 16th-century Scotland
- Terry "Harmonica" Bean (born 1961), American blues harmonicist, guitarist and songwriter.
- Theodora Bean (1871–1926), American suffragist and journalist
- William ("W. H.") Bean, of Bean Brothers, Australian businessman

== People nicknamed Bean or Beans ==
- Ansonbean (born 2000), Hong Kong singer and actor
- Coleman Hawkins (1904–1969), American jazz saxophonist, known as "Bean"
- Beans Reardon (1897–1984), American baseball umpire
- Gene "Bean" Baxter, radio host of the Kevin and Bean show

== Fictional characters ==
- Mr. Bean (character), main character from the eponymous British sitcom played by Rowan Atkinson
  - Bean (film), a feature film based on the above sitcom
- Bean (Enderverse), a character in the Ender's Game series of books
- Bean the Dynamite, from Sonic the Hedgehog
- Hannibal Roy Bean, from Xiaolin Showdown
- Bean played by Alan Arkin in the 1974 film, Freebie and The Bean
- Beans (Looney Tunes), a black and white Looney Tunes character
- the title character of Baron Bean, a syndicated newspaper comic strip
- Benjamin "Beans" Baxter, in the American television series The New Adventures of Beans Baxter
- Bernard "Beans" Aranguren, a recurring character in the American television series Even Stevens
- Bean Bradley, in the video game MySims
- Bean, the main character in the animated series Disenchantment (TV series)
- Isaac Bean, a Season 4 contestant in Fetch! with Ruff Ruffman
- Jack "Killer" Bean, the protagonist of Killer Bean Forever, voiced by Vegas J. Jenkins (2009 movie) and Jeff Lew (2020 series)
- Bean, in the children's book series Ivy and Bean
- Clarice Bean, in the Clarice Bean series of children's books
- Franklin Bean, main antagonist of Fantastic Mr. Fox
- Beans, in the horror video game Baldi's Basics in Education and Learning
- Beans, bean-shaped creatures from the Dumb Ways to Die franchise and campaign
- "Beans", a nickname for the titular species in the game Fall Guys

== See also ==
- Justice Bean (disambiguation)
- Beane (surname)
