= Bean (disambiguation) =

A bean is a large seed of several plants in the family Fabaceae.

Bean or beans may also refer to:

== Arts and entertainment ==
- Mr. Bean, a British television series
  - Bean (film), a 1997 comedy film based on the television series
- Beans (2000 film), a Turkish comedy mafia film
- Beans (2020 film), a Canadian drama
- Beans (band), an Italian pop musical group
- "Bean (Kobe)", a 2020 song by rapper Lil Uzi Vert
- "Bean", a song from the 1995 album La Mia Vita Violenta by Blonde Redhead
- "The Bean", a nickname of Cloud Gate, a sculpture in Chicago, United States
- "The Bean", a nickname of Cloud Column, a sculpture in Houston, United States
- "Beanz", a song from the deluxe edition of the 2014 album 48:13 by Kasabian
- "Beans", a song by Kurt Cobain from Montage of Heck: The Home Recordings

== People and fictional characters ==
- Bean (name), a list of people and fictional characters with the surname or nickname
- Fred D. Beans (1906–1980), United States Marine Corps brigadier general
- James D. Beans (born 1934), United States Marine Corps brigadier general, son of Fred Beans
- Jim Beanz (born 1980), music producer, songwriter and singer
- Beans (rapper) (Robert Edward Stewart II, born 1971)

== Places ==
=== United States ===
- Bean Creek (Zayante Creek tributary), California
- Bean Creek (Salt River tributary), Missouri
- Bean Lake (Cottonwood County, Minnesota)
- Bean Lake (Missouri)
- Bean River, New Hampshire

=== Elsewhere ===
- Division of Bean, Australian Capital Territory, an electoral division
- Bean, Kent, England

== Other uses ==
- Bean (software), a word processor for Mac OS X
- Walkman Bean, a portable media player
- BEAN (charity), an American volunteering organization
- Bean Cars, an early British car company
- Mighty Beanz, the name of a Toy Line.

== See also ==
- Beane (disambiguation)
- Been (disambiguation)
- L.L.Bean, an American retailer of outdoor gear and apparel
- Beanball, in baseball, a ball thrown with the intention of striking an opposing player
- Bean Road Underpass, a planned tunnel in Kent, England
- Beantown, a nickname of Boston, Massachusetts, U.S., the home of Boston baked beans
- JavaBeans, reusable software components used in Java programming
- McBean (disambiguation)
- Beaner (disambiguation)
- Beanie (disambiguation)
- Beano (disambiguation)
