= Beaner (disambiguation) =

Beaner is a derogatory term for a Hispanic or Latino.

Beaner or variant, may also refer to:

- Beanball or beaner, a baseball pitch thrown at the head
- Beaner Lake, a lake in Okanogan County, Washington, US
- Beaner's, a U.S. coffeehouse chain now known as Biggby Coffee
- Wayne McBean (born 1969, nicknamed "Beaner"), Canadian ice hockey player
- Bernie Beaner, a fictional character from 2007 novel Plum Lovin'
- "Beaner: The 303" (record), a 2002 recording by Måns Groundstroem
- "Biner" (homophone), a shortened name for a Carabiner used for safety in rope climbing

== See also ==
- Bean (disambiguation)
- Beano (disambiguation)
- Beanie (disambiguation)
- McBean (disambiguation)
