= Beaney =

Beaney is a surname. Notable people with the surname include:

- Alan Beaney (1905–1985), UK politician
- Bill Beaney (born 1951), U.S. ice hockey coach
- James Beaney (1828–1891), Australian politician

== See also ==
- Captain Beany (born 1954), UK Welsh fundraiser and eccentric
- Beanie (disambiguation)
- Beane (surname)
- Beene (surname)
- Beeney (surname)
- Beeny (surname)
