= Beano =

Beano may refer to:

== Arts and entertainment ==
- Beano, another name for the American version of Bingo, a game of chance
- Beano, a character on the American television sitcom Out of This World
- The Beano, a British children's comic featuring mainly humour
- Beano Studios, a subsidiary of DC Thomson who publish The Beano
- The Beano Album, colloquial name for Blues Breakers with Eric Clapton, a 1966 album by John Mayall and the Bluesbreakers

== People ==
- Alan Bean (Astronaut, 1932–2018), nicknamed "Beano"
- Beano Cook (1931–2012), ESPN sports commentator
- Brian McDonald (Laois Gaelic footballer) (born 1980), Gaelic footballer nicknamed "Beano"

== Other uses ==
- Beano (dietary supplement), used to prevent flatulence
- Beanos, a former second-hand record shop, once the largest in Europe, located in Croydon, England
- T13 Beano Grenade, an experimental hand grenade
- Beano, short for bean-feast, a British colloquial term for an excursion or celebration with food and drink

== See also ==
- Stirling Albion F.C., nicknamed the Binos
- Beaner (disambiguation)
- Beanie (disambiguation)
- Bean (disambiguation)
