= Bean Lake =

Bean Lake is the name of two lakes in the United States:

- Bean Lake (Cottonwood County, Minnesota)
- Bean Lake (Missouri)
