= Beeney =

Beeney is a surname. Notable people with the surname include:

- Aaron Beeney (born 1984), English darts player
- Erica Beeney, US scriptwriter
- Mark Beeney (born 1967), English footballer and coach
- Mitchell Beeney (born 1995), English footballer

== See also ==
- Beanie (disambiguation)
- Beene (surname)
- Beeny (surname)
- Deeney
- Feeney
- Seeney
