= Deeney =

Deeney is a surname. Notable people with the surname include:

- Saul Deeney (born 1983), Irish footballer
- Troy Deeney (born 1988), English footballer
- Vincent Deeney (1915–1999), American rower

== See also ==
- Beeney
- Denney (surname)
- Feeney
- Seeney
