= George Herriman =

American cartoonist (1880–1944)

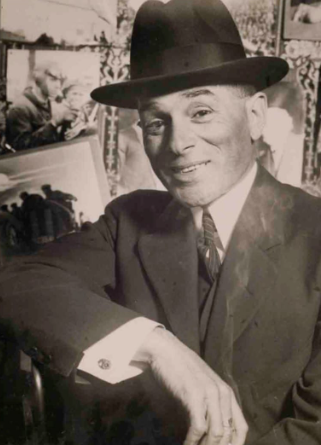
- Herriman, undated photograph
- Born: George Joseph Herriman; August 22, 1880 New Orleans, Louisiana, US
- Died: April 25, 1944 (aged 63) Los Angeles, California, US
- Area: Cartoonist
- Notable works: Krazy Kat (1913–1944)
- Spouse: Mabel Lillian Bridge (m. 1902; died 1931)
- Children: 2

George Joseph Herriman III (August 22, 1880 – April 25, 1944) was an American cartoonist best known for the comic strip Krazy Kat (1913–1944). More influential than popular, Krazy Kat had an appreciative audience among those in the arts. Gilbert Seldes' article "The Krazy Kat Who Walks by Himself" was the earliest example of a critic from the high arts giving serious attention to a comic strip. The Comics Journal placed the strip first on its list of the greatest comics of the 20th century. Herriman's work has been a primary influence on cartoonists such as Elzie C. Segar, Will Eisner, Walt Kelly, Charles M. Schulz, Robert Crumb, Art Spiegelman, Bill Watterson, and Chris Ware.

Herriman was born in New Orleans, Louisiana, to mixed-race Creole parents, and grew up in Los Angeles. After he graduated from high school in 1897, he worked in the newspaper industry as an illustrator and engraver. He moved on to cartooning and comic strips—a medium then in its infancy—and drew a variety of strips until he introduced his most famous character, Krazy Kat, in his strip The Dingbat Family in 1910. A Krazy Kat daily strip began in 1913, and from 1916 the strip also appeared on Sundays. It was noted for its poetic, dialect-heavy dialogue; its fantastic, shifting backgrounds; and its bold, experimental page layouts.

In the strip's main motif and dynamic, Ignatz Mouse pelted Krazy with bricks, which the naïve, androgynous Kat interpreted as symbols of love. As the strip progressed, a love triangle developed between Krazy, Ignatz, and Offisa Pupp. Pupp made it his mission to prevent Ignatz from throwing bricks at Krazy, or to jail him for having done so, but his efforts were perpetually impeded because Krazy wished to be struck by Ignatz's bricks.

Herriman lived most of his life in Los Angeles, but made frequent trips to the Navajo deserts in the Southwestern United States. He was drawn to the landscapes of Monument Valley and the Enchanted Mesa, and made Coconino County the location of his Krazy Kat strips. His artwork made much use of Navajo and Mexican themes and motifs against shifting desert backgrounds. He was a prolific cartoonist who produced a large number of strips and illustrated Don Marquis's books of poetry about Archy and Mehitabel, an alley cat and a cockroach. Newspaper magnate William Randolph Hearst was a proponent of Herriman and gave him a lifetime contract with King Features Syndicate, which guaranteed Herriman a comfortable living and an outlet for his work despite its lack of popularity.

== Biography ==
=== 1880–1900: Early life ===
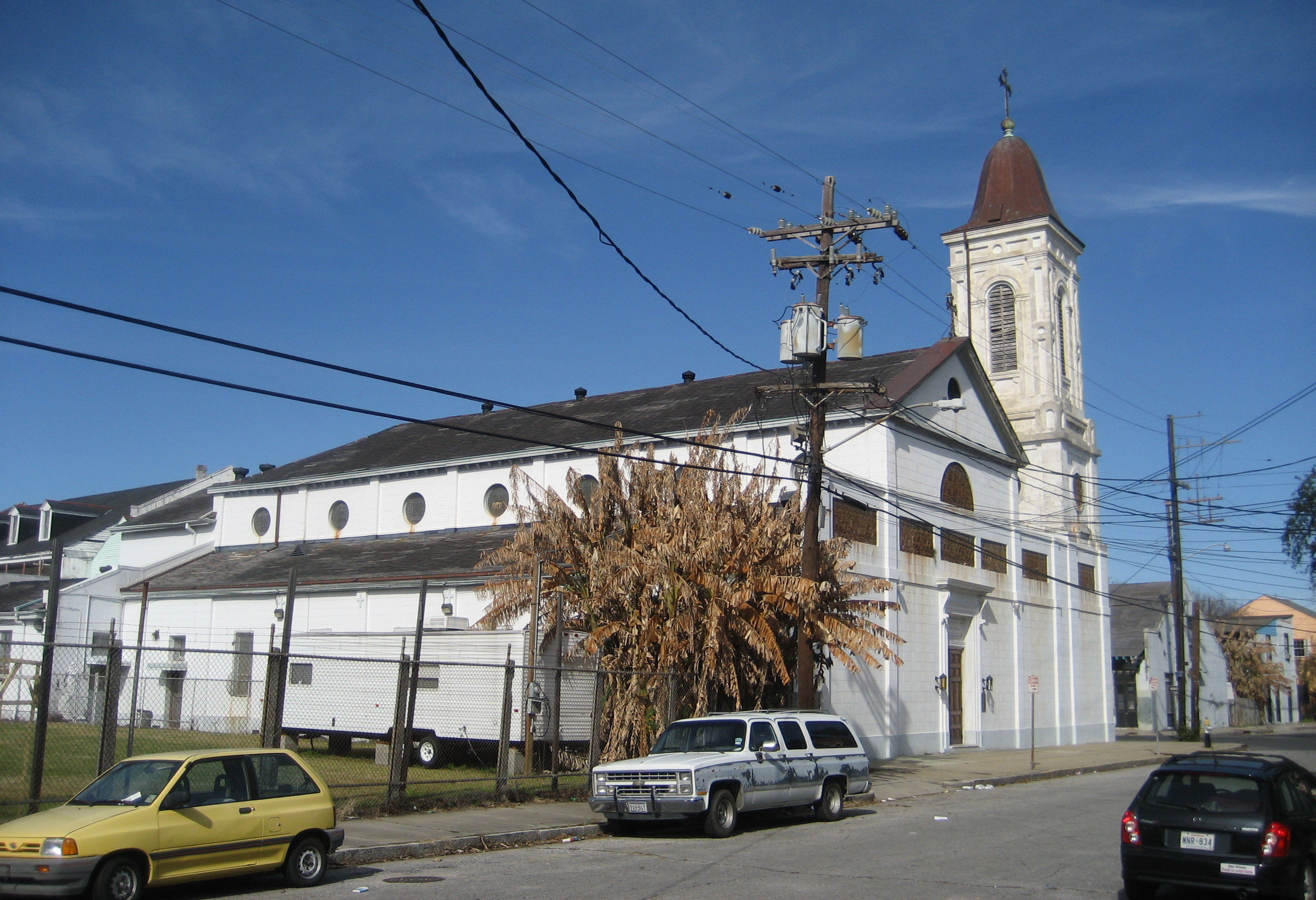
The Herrimans attended St. Augustine Catholic Church in Tremé in New Orleans.

George Joseph Herriman was born at 348 Villere Street (Note: McDonogh 35 High School later occupied the site.) in New Orleans on August 22, 1880. He was born into a mixed-race family and came from a line of French-speaking Louisiana Creole mulattoes who were considered free people of color, and were reportedly active in the early abolitionist movement. His paternal great-grandfather, Stephen Herriman, was a white New Yorker who had children with Justine Olivier, a free woman of color, and owned a tailor shop on Royal Street in New Orleans. (Note: The shop was occupied by Bryant Galleries as of 2010.) His paternal grandmother was born in Havana, Cuba. His parents were George Herriman, Jr., born in New Orleans, and Clara Morel Herriman, born in Iberville. The family attended St. Augustine Catholic Church

When he was ten, Herriman and his family moved to Los Angeles, where he grew up south of downtown near Main Street and Washington Boulevard. His father worked there as a tailor. Herriman attended the Catholic boys' school St. Vincent's College (now Loyola High School). Soon after graduating in 1897, he sold a sketch of the Hotel Petrolia in Santa Paula to the Los Angeles Herald. This landed him a $2-per-week job there as an assistant in the engraving department, where he occasionally did drawings for advertisements and political cartoons.

=== 1900–1905: Early career in New York ===
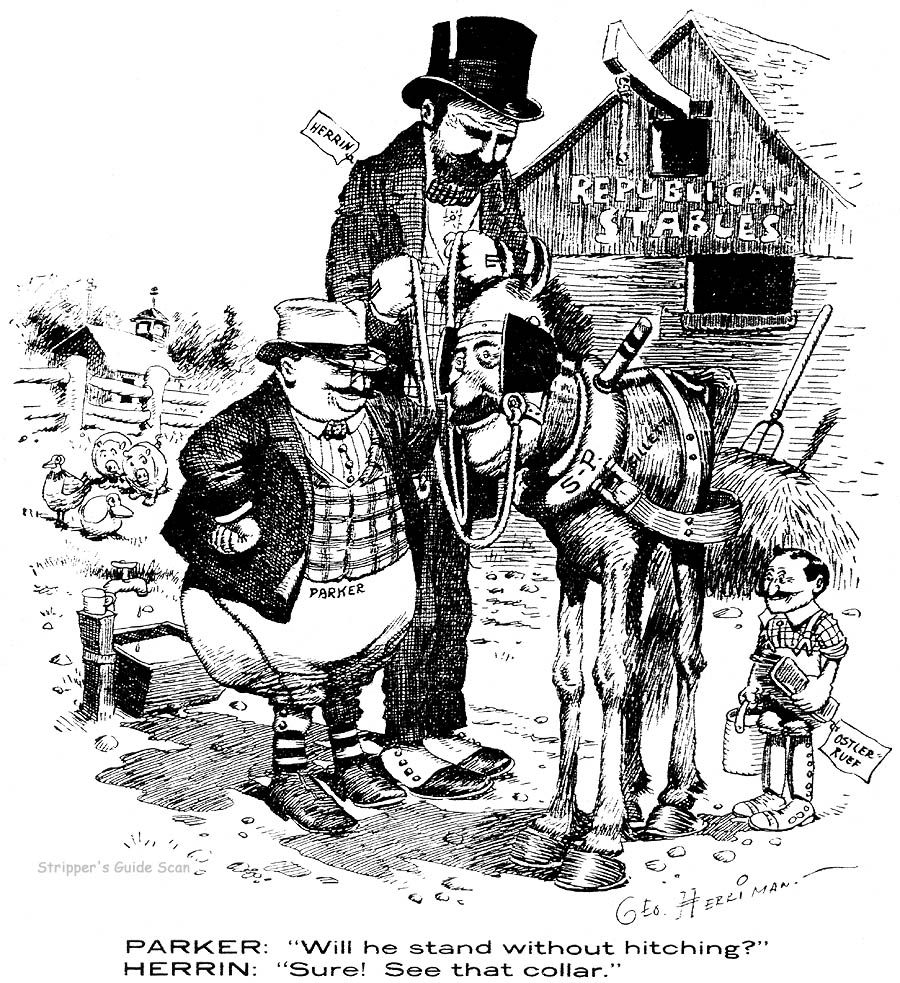
Herriman's earliest published works were humor and editorial cartoons. (September 7, 1906)

When he was 20, Herriman clandestinely boarded a freight train bound for New York City, hoping his chances as an artist would be better there. He was unsuccessful at first, and survived by working as a barker and billboard painter at Coney Island, until one of the leading humor magazines of the day, Judge, accepted some of his cartoons. Between June 15 and October 26, 1901, eleven of his cartoons appeared in that magazine's pages, in the heavily crosshatched style of the day. He often used sequential images in his cartoons, as in the emerging comic strip medium. On September 29 that year, his first real comic strips were published, one in the Pulitzer chain of newspapers on a non-contractual, one-shot basis and another on a continuing basis in the Philadelphia North American Syndicate's first comic strip supplement. His first color comic strips appeared in the T. C. McClure Syndicate beginning October 20.

His success with these syndicated strips convinced Herriman to give up on magazine submissions. For the Pulitzer papers on February 16, 1902, he began his first strip that had a continuing character, Musical Mose. The strip featured an African-American musician who impersonated other ethnicities, only to suffer the consequences when discovered by his audience. Professor Otto and his Auto, about a terrifyingly dangerous driver, followed in March, and Acrobatic Archie, a "kid strip" with a child protagonist, first appeared in April. With his future as a cartoonist seemingly assured, Herriman traveled back to Los Angeles to marry his childhood sweetheart and returned with her to New York.

In the November 1902 issue of the literary magazine The Bookman, Herriman wrote of his profession self-deprecatingly, while poet La Touche Hancock, in an article in that issue titled "The American Comic and Caricature Art", wrote, "Art and poetry is the characteristic of George Herriman. Were his drawings not so well known one would think he had mistaken his vocation." Herriman's work was increasing in popularity, and he occasionally had front-page, full-color strips for the Pulitzer supplements, such as Two Jolly Jackies about two unemployed sailors, which began in January 1903. He began drawing the cowboy strip Lariat Pete in September for the McClure syndicate after Two Jolly Jackies was ended.

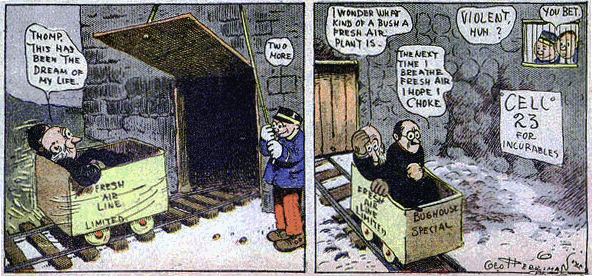
The comic strip Major Ozone's Fresh Air Crusade (1904–1906) was an early success for Herriman. (April 21, 1906)

In June, Herriman was employed by the New York World. There, he illustrated Roy McCardell's commentaries on local events, beginning June 28 and running to the year's end. Herriman still produced syndicate work, such as Major Ozone's Fresh Air Crusade for the World Color Printing Company beginning January 2, 1904. Another of Herriman's obsessive characters, the Major traveled the world in an unsuccessful search for the purest air and spouted poetic dialogue. Major Ozone was so popular that it soon was given the supplement's front page. The same month, Herriman moved from the World to the New York Daily News, where he was given a larger quantity and variety of work, including cartoon reporting on sports and politics. In February and March, he had a short-lived continuing character comic strip about domestic life called Home Sweet Home. That spring, he began illustrating a series of articles written by Walter Murphy called Bubblespikers.

Rudolph Block hired Herriman for the Hearst papers with "a salary commensurate with his talents", starting April 22 at the New York American, which ran no daily comic strips at the time. Herriman drew sports cartoons in an office alongside Frederick Burr Opper, James Swinnerton, and Tad Dorgan, who was popularly known as "Tad" and was considered a star at another Hearst paper, the New York Evening Journal. Tad and Herriman were often assigned to cover the same sporting events and became close friends. In 1924, Tad called Herriman "one of the best sporting artists in the world" and regretted that Herriman no longer did that kind of work. Herriman continued with Hearst until June 1905, when he left the paper, possibly because of the new sports editor's unsympathetic attitude to cartoonists. He returned to Los Angeles in the latter half of 1905.

=== 1905–1910: Return to California ===
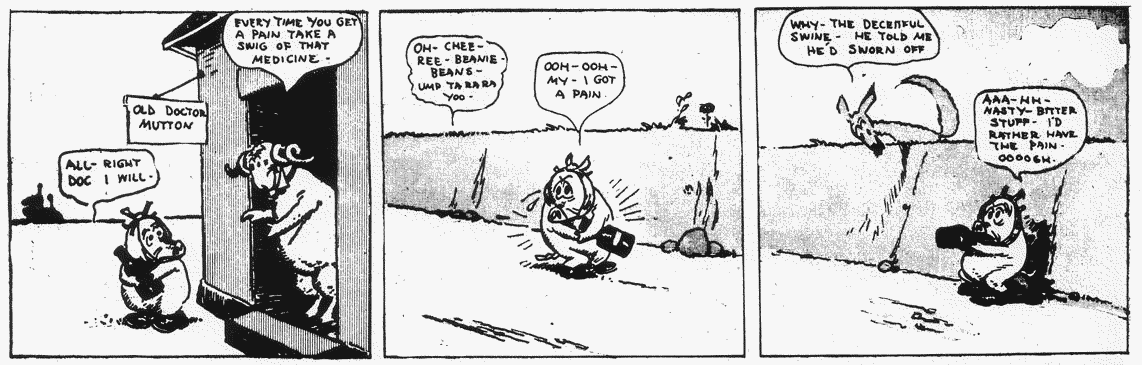
Daniel and Pansy, Herriman's first all-animal strip (December 4, 1909)

In California, Herriman continued to mail in work to the World Color Printing Company. He revived Major Ozone and produced Grandma's Girl—Likewise Bud Smith, which he combined from two earlier strips, and a two-tiered children's strip, Rosy Posy—Mama's Girl. He began to work with the Los Angeles Times on January 8, 1906, before returning to Hearst that summer. Accompanying a front-page illustration in Hearst's Los Angeles Examiner, Herriman was announced as "the Examiner's cartoonist" on August 21. His artwork began to appear on nearly every page, resulting in greatly increased sales for the newspaper. In October, he stopped working for World Color.

Following the success of Bud Fisher's daily strip A. Mutt, (Note: Herriman may also have been inspired by the earlier daily strip A. Piker Clerk (1903–04) by Clare Briggs, which also had a sports theme, and which Herriman had likely seen.) which debuted in late 1907, Herriman began a similarly sports-themed daily strip starting December 10 called Mr. Proones the Plunger. The strip was not as successful as Fisher's, and it ceased to appear after December 26.

Mary's Home from College, a precursor to the popular "girl strips" such as Cliff Sterrett's Polly and Her Pals and John Held Jr.'s Merely Margie, ran from February 19, 1909, until January 4, 1910. His next comic strip, Baron Mooch, starring the titular freeloader, debuted in the Examiner on October 12, 1909. Herriman began two more strips in November 1909 with the World Color Printing Company—Alexander the Cat and Daniel and Pansy, which both appeared in color. Daniel and Pansy was Herriman's first strip to feature an all-animal cast. This was followed in the Examiner on December 23 by Gooseberry Sprig, about an aristocratic, cigar-smoking duck who had previously and popularly appeared in Herriman's sports cartoons. The bird-populated fantasy was a precursor to Krazy Kat, and many of its characters reappeared in the later strip.

=== 1910–1922: New York again, and Krazy Kat ===
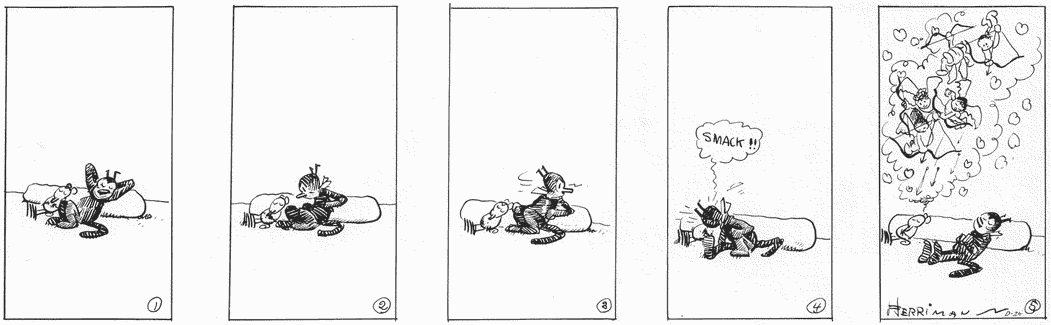
Krazy Kat daily strip — Krazy Kat kisses a sleeping Ignatz Mouse, who then dreams of cupids. (December 24, 1917)

In 1910, the sports editor of the New York Evening Journal called Herriman back to New York to cover for Tad Dorgan who was in San Francisco covering the "Fight of the Century" between Jack Johnson and Jim Jeffries. Six days after arriving in New York, Herriman began The Dingbat Family, starring E. Pluribus Dingbat and his family. Herriman used typed lettering on the strip on July 26, 1910, but quickly went back to hand-lettering. On July 27, 1910, Herriman retitled the strip The Family Upstairs. The original title returned after the strip of November 15, 1911, when the Dingbats' building was demolished to make room for a department store and they and their upstairs nemeses parted paths.

Critics do not regard the strip highly, but it provided the vehicle for a fruitful situation: in the July 26 episode, a mouse threw a brick at the family cat—called "Kat"—which hit the cat on the head. The antics of this mouse and "Kat" continued to appear in the bottom portion of The Dingbat Family. Herriman said he did this "to fill up the waste space". About a month after its first appearance, the "Kat" crept up on the sleeping mouse and kissed it loudly. The mouse awoke saying, "I dreamed an angel kissed me", while the "Kat" crept away and said, "Sweet thing".

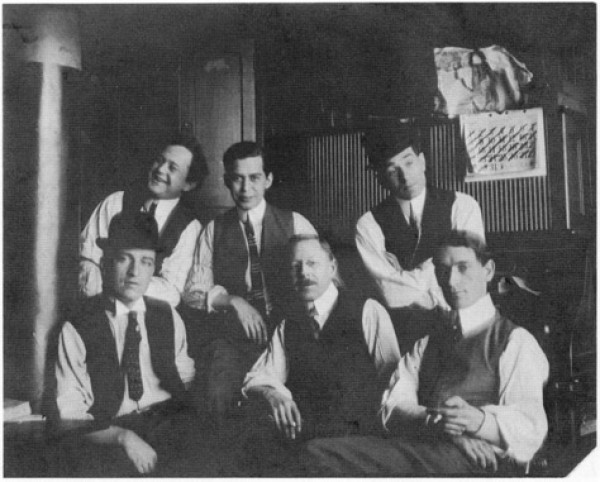
The cartoon staff at the New York Evening Journal (January 3, 1911) Top, from left: Gus Mager, Charles Wellington, Herriman Bottom, from left: Harry Hershfield, Ike Anderson, Tad Dorgan

The gender of "Kat" was unclear from the start. Herriman experimented with a decision about the character's gender, but it remained ambiguous and he would refer to "Kat" as "he" or "she" as he saw fit. Herriman incorporated unusual details into the mini-strip's backgrounds such as cacti, pagodas, fanciful vegetation, or anything else that struck his fancy; this became a signature of the later Krazy Kat strip. The cast grew and soon included the mainstay character Bull Pupp and characters from the Gooseberry Sprigg strip. The strip's characters, relations and situations grew organically during its lifetime, encouraged by Herriman's colleagues.

The cat-and-mouse substrip was gaining in popularity; instead of filling up space in the bottom of The Dingbat Family's panels, it began to occupy a tier of panels of its own. In July 1912, while Herriman had the Dingbats on vacation, Krazy Kat and Ignatz Mouse took over the strip, which was retitled Krazy Kat and I. Mouse for the duration. On October 28, 1913, Krazy Kat debuted as an independent strip on the daily comics page.

Only Hearst's personal support allowed the strip to continue, as the reception from the readers showed zero interest or enthusiasm according to comics historian Bill Blackbeard. But it was liked by famous artists and writers such as Willem de Kooning, Picasso and Edwin Denby, and later by E. E. Cummings, Jack Kerouac and Umberto Eco.

During the first few years of publication, Krazy Kat's humor changed from slapstick to a more vaudevillian kind. The shifting backgrounds became increasingly bizarre, presaging things to come. The strip expanded to a full-page black-and-white Sunday strip on April 23, 1916. (Note: April 23, 1916, was actually a Saturday.) Herriman made full use of his imagination and used the whole page in the strip's layout. The strips were unlike anything else on the comics page; spontaneous, formally daring, yet impeccably composed.

Herriman visited Monument Valley in Arizona and similar places in New Mexico and southern Utah, and incorporated the distinct forms of the desert landscape into his strips. The Enchanted Mesa of New Mexico first appeared in Krazy Kat in the summer of 1916. Herriman may have visited after reading an article by Theodore Roosevelt in 1913, but he may have gone earlier—the desert Coconino County, Arizona, that became the backdrop to Krazy Kat was first mentioned in a 1911 The Dingbat Family strip, though the real Coconino County was located further southwest than Herriman's fanciful version.

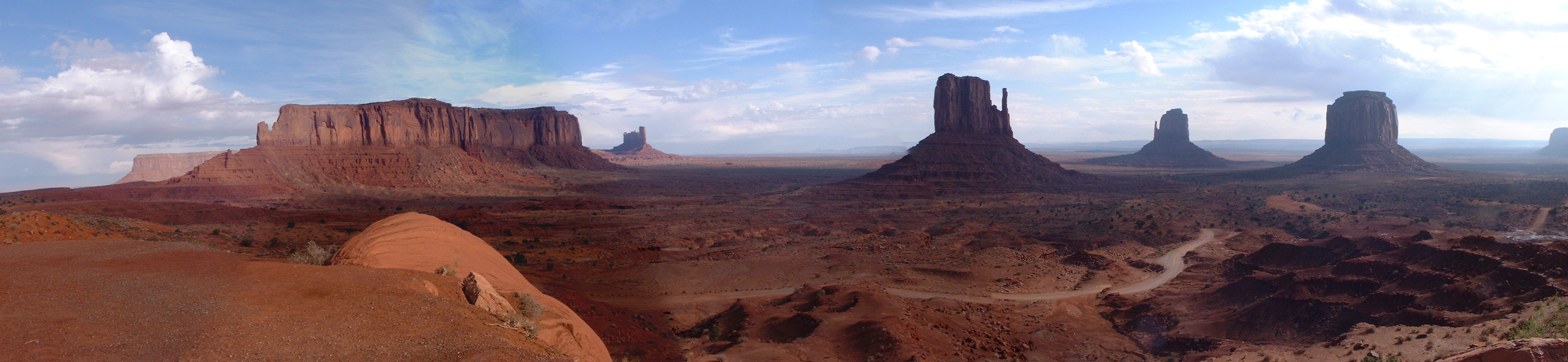
Herriman was enamored with the impressive rock formations at Monument Valley in Arizona.

The Dingbat Family finished in 1916 and was replaced by Baron Bean's debut the next day. The strip's title character, The Baron, was an impoverished English nobleman, a tramp inspired by Charles Dickens and Charlie Chaplin. He and his valet Grimes would plot ways to get by. Herriman later introduced the main characters' wives, and after a run as a domestic strip, with occasional appearances of characters from Krazy Kat's world, it ended in January 1919. It was replaced the next day by Now Listen Mabel, which was about a young man courting a young woman; he would be caught in a compromising situation, which he would try to explain away with "Now listen Mabel ..." The strip lasted until that December.

It happens that in America irony and fantasy are practised in the major arts by only one or two men, producing high-class trash; and Mr Herriman, working in a despised medium, without an atom of pretentiousness, is day after day producing something essentially fine. It is the result of a naive sensibility rather like that of the douanier Rousseau [Henri Rousseau]; it does not lack intelligence, because it is a thought-out, a constructed piece of work.

— Gilbert Seldes in The Seven Lively Arts (1924)

Krazy Kat gained an appreciative audience in the world of the arts. The character debuted in film in 1916. The first animated films starring a cat were produced by Hearst's International Film Service, though without Herriman's direct involvement. In 1922, Adolph Bolm choreographed a jazz-pantomime Krazy Kat ballet written by John Alden Carpenter. It was first performed in New York in 1922 by Ballet Intime, and Herriman illustrated the libretto and designed the costumes and scenario. While it was not a great success, the critics Deems Taylor, Stark Young and Henrietta Straus wrote favorably about it. The strip itself was the subject of an article by literary critic Gilbert Seldes called "Golla, Golla the Comic Strip's Art", which appeared in the May 1922 issue of Vanity Fair. Seldes expanded this article as part of his book on the popular arts, The Seven Lively Arts (1924), in which Seldes argued against conservative tendencies that excluded artists in the popular arts, such as Herriman and Chaplin, from being considered alongside traditional artists. Krazy Kat was the subject of a chapter entitled "The Krazy Kat That Walks by Himself", which is the most famous piece of writing about the strip and the earliest example of a critic from the world of high art giving legitimacy to the comic strip medium. Vanity Fair inducted Herriman into its Hall of Fame in the April 1923 issue.

=== 1922–1944: California again, later career and death ===
Hearst, an admirer of Krazy Kat, had given Herriman a lifetime contract with his company King Features Syndicate, which gave Herriman the security to live anywhere he wanted. In 1922, he moved back to Hollywood, into a two-story Spanish-style home at 1617 North Sierra Bonita, from where he made frequent visits to the Arizona desert. Herriman developed ties with members of the film industry; he knew Hal Roach Studio members Tom McNamara and "Beanie" Walker from their newspaper days. Walker, Herriman's best friend, was the head writer on the Our Gang shorts. In the early 1920s, Herriman occasionally drew his strips at the Roach Studio. He met celebrities, including Will Rogers and Frank Capra, and presented them with hand-colored drawings. He loved Charlie Chaplin's films, and reviewed The Gold Rush in the magazine Motion Picture Classics in October 1925.

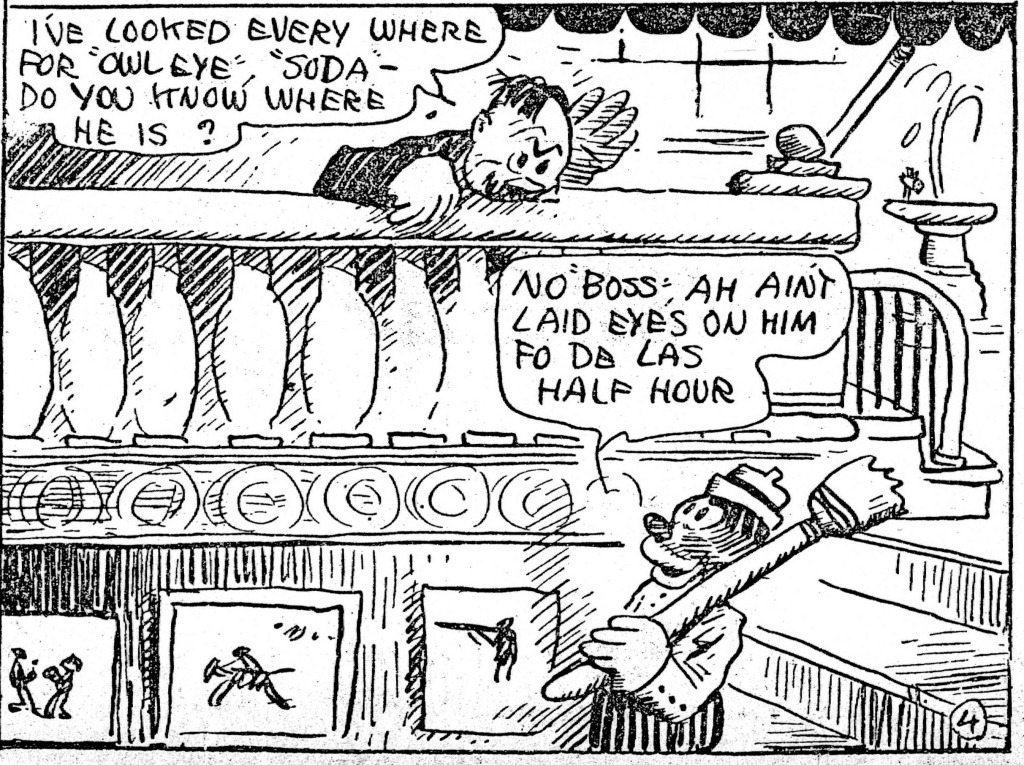
Stumble Inn ran from 1922 until 1925 (December 23, 1922).

Autumn 1922 saw the first daily installment of Stumble Inn, the first non-Krazy Kat strip Herriman had drawn since 1919. A verbose strip whose Sundays were often overrun with prose, its lead characters were Uriah and Ida Stumble, who rented rooms to an assortment of strange characters. The daily strip was short-lived, but the Sundays edition lasted three years.

From August 1925 until September 1929, King Features required that Herriman design the Krazy Kat Sundays so that they could be run either as a full Sunday page or as two four-panel dailies. Herriman lamented intrusion on his page designs, and the artwork of the period took on a rushed look. He was made to focus on the strip's characterization, and during this period, the Krazy—Ignatz—Offisa Pupp love triangle for which the strip is remembered became fully developed. Pupp pined for Krazy, Krazy loved Ignatz, and Ignatz hated Krazy and pelted the annoying "Kat" with a brick, and Pupp imprisoned Ignatz.

Throughout the late 1920s, Herriman made frequent trips to Kayenta, Arizona, in Navajo country about 25 miles (40 km) from Monument Valley. He also made winter trips to Mexico. The desert, Navajo artwork, and Mexican pottery and architecture became more prominent in Herriman's strips, and he sometimes used Spanish vocabulary in the dialogue. Herriman did little work on these excursions, and it is likely that he drew his strips in hurried bursts when in Hollywood.

Stumble Inn finished in late 1925, and it was replaced with the domestic strip Us Husbands (with Mistakes Will Happen as a "topper" strip), which ran until the end of that year. In 1928, Herriman took over the strip Embarrassing Moments, which had begun in 1922 and had been drawn by several cartoonists. The strip eventually became Bernie Burns, in which embarrassing moments would happen to the title character. The strip appeared in few papers, and after it ended in 1932, Herriman worked only on Krazy Kat, although he provided illustrations for Don Marquis' popular Archy and Mehitabel, a series of books of poetry about a cat and a cockroach.

In 1930, Herriman sold his first Hollywood home to a friend and moved his family to 2217 Maravilla Drive, a Spanish-style mansion atop a hill. It was adorned with paintings of Southwest and Native themes, and had a Mexican-style garden paved with flagstones and decorated with painted pots and tropical plants. Herriman later bought the lot across the street and turned it into a public park.

The 1930s were a period of tragedy for Herriman. On September 29, 1931, his wife Mabel died after an automobile accident, and in 1939, his youngest daughter Bobbie died unexpectedly at 31.

After his wife's death, Herriman never remarried and lived in Los Angeles with his cats and dogs. He developed a close relationship with cartoonist James Swinnerton's first wife Louise, with whom he frequently exchanged letters. Herriman underwent a kidney operation in spring 1938, and during his ten-week convalescence King Features reran old Krazy Kat strips.

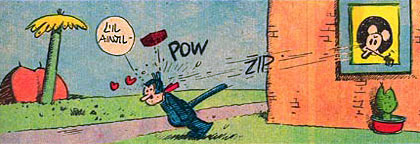
Starting in 1935, Krazy Kat ran in color. (November 7, 1937)

Krazy Kat's popularity fell considerably over the years, and by the 1930s it was running in only thirty-five newspapers, while its contemporaries such as Bringing Up Father were reportedly running in up to a thousand. By some accounts, Herriman's salary from Hearst's King Features Syndicate was $750 a week, and, realizing that this was far more than the revenue the strip could be generating, Herriman once offered to take a pay cut, which Hearst refused; however, according to Michael Tisserand's biography on Herriman from 2016, there exists no evidence of the story that Herriman ever suggested to take a pay cut, or that his salary was $750 a week.

From 1935, Krazy Kat appeared in color, of which Herriman made bold use. He reduced the amount of hatchwork and used larger, more open panels.

Herriman died in his sleep in his home near Hollywood on April 25, 1944, after a long illness. An incompletely inked penciling of a week's worth of daily strips was found on his drawing board. On his death certificate, the cause of death was listed as "non-alcoholic cirrhosis of the liver", and despite his mixed-race heritage, he was listed as "caucasian". The New York Journal-American ran a front-page obituary. His funeral at Little Church of Flowers at Forest Lawn Memorial Park was attended by few. Cartoonist Harry Hershfield spoke at the funeral, saying, "If ever there was a saint on earth, it was George Herriman". According to his request, his body was cremated and his remains were scattered over Monument Valley.

On June 25, 1944, two months after Herriman's death, the last of his completed Krazy Kat strips, a full-page Sunday, was printed. At the time, Hearst usually engaged new cartoonists when the artists of popular strips quit or died, but he made an exception for Herriman, as he felt that no one could take his place.

== Personal life ==
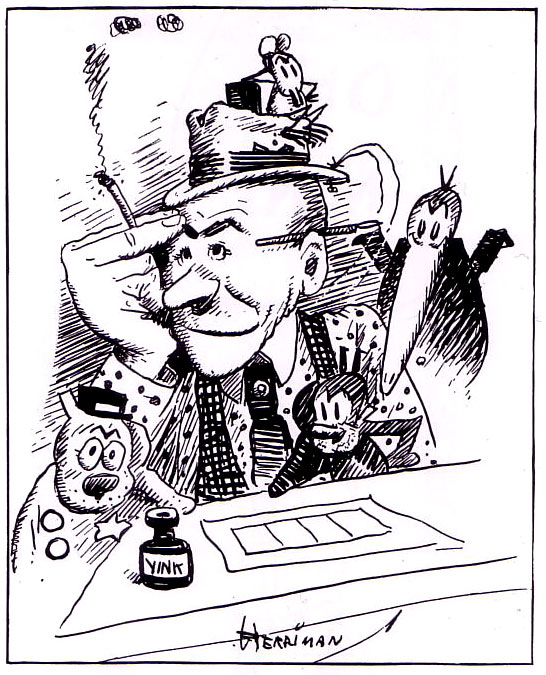
Self-portrait, 1922

Herriman was described as self-deprecatingly modest, and he disliked being photographed. The New York Journal-American's obituary described him as a devoted husband and father, of slight build, mild-mannered and an anonymous contributor to charities. He was generous to his friends, and sold his first Hollywood house, which he had bought for $50,000, to a friend for $40,000. Though a private person, he was said to be an entertaining host to his friends. He would sometimes stay silent during social occasions and would often leave the room to wash dishes, which he said he enjoyed as it gave him the opportunity to think. His favorite game was poker, which he particularly enjoyed playing with his fellow cartoonists.

Herriman had a great love of animals, and had a large number of dogs and cats; he had five dogs and thirteen cats in 1934. He usually kept to a vegetarian diet, except when it made him feel too weak, and he refused to ride horses. He so admired Henry Ford's pacifist stance that he would only buy Ford automobiles. He purchased a new model annually.

Herriman married his childhood sweetheart Mabel Lillian Bridge in Los Angeles on July 7, 1902. They had two daughters: Mabel (1903-1962), nicknamed "Toodles" (later "Toots") and Barbara (1908-1939), nicknamed "Bobbie", who had epilepsy and died unexpectedly in 1939 at the age of 31.

== Race and identity ==
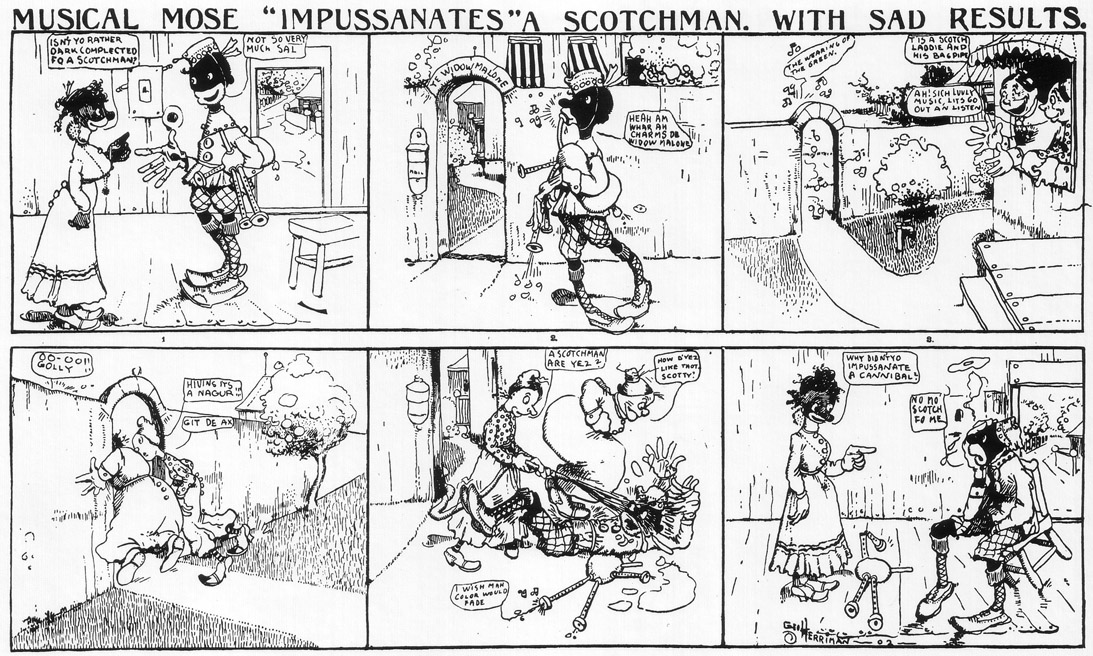
Though Herriman had mixed ethnicity, he partook in the ethnic humor that was typical at the time. (Musical Mose, February 16, 1902)

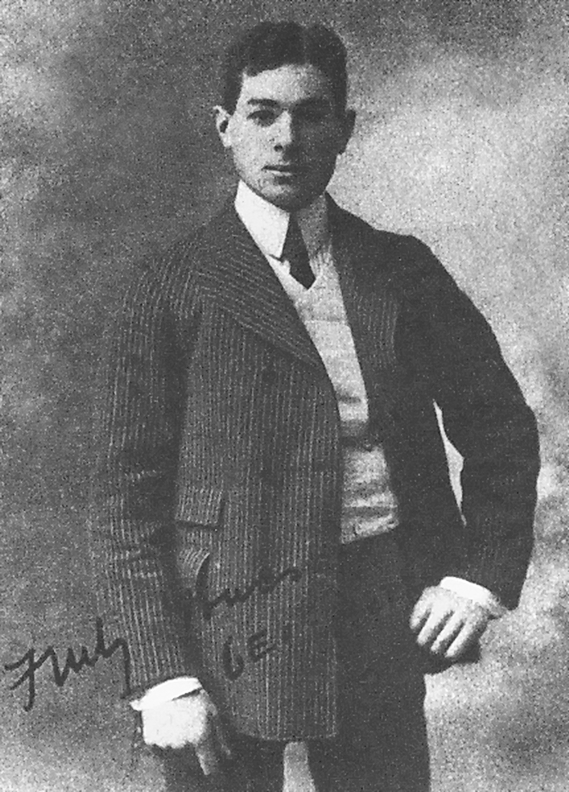
Herriman, who was of mixed heritage, kept his "kinky hair" under a hat (1902).

Herriman was born to mixed-race parents, and his birth certificate lists Herriman as "colored". In the post–Plessy v. Ferguson U.S., in which "separate but equal" racial segregation was enshrined, people of mixed race had to choose to identify themselves as either black or white. Herriman seems to have identified himself as white. According to comics academic Jeet Heer, his early work is "replete with black caricatures", such as Musical Mose, in which the lead character, an African-American musician, wishes his "color would fade". Racial ambivalence crept into Krazy Kat, such as on two occasions where Krazy's black fur was dyed white. Ignatz falls in love with the whitened Krazy, only to return to hatred and brick-throwing when the truth is revealed. Similarly, in an oft-repeated joke, Ignatz would accidentally become covered with coal dust and would be spurned by the normally love-struck Krazy. In one such episode, a brick thrown by the blackened Ignatz hits Krazy, who declares, "A lil Eetiopium Mice, black like a month from midnights. Fuwi!" (Note: "A little Ethiopian Mouse, black like a month of midnights. Phooey!") Once Ignatz reverts to his white self, Krazy loves him again.

Herriman's ethnic heritage was unknown to his colleagues. Fellow cartoonist Tad Dorgan nicknamed him "the Greek", a label which stuck and was taken up by his biographers and the press, who called him the son of a Greek baker. At other times, he was identified as French, Irish, and Turkish. He told a friend that he was Creole, and speculated that he may have "Negro blood" in him, as he had "kinky hair". The friend said that Herriman wore a hat to hide his hair, which may have been an attempt to pass as white. Herriman said that he dreamed of being reborn a Navajo. On his death certificate, he was listed as "Caucasian", and his daughter Mabel had his father's birthplace listed as Paris and his mother's as Alsace-Lorraine.

Sociologist Arthur Asa Berger made Herriman's mixed-race heritage known in 1971. While researching for Herriman's entry for the Dictionary of American Biography, Berger discovered the cartoonist's race was listed as "colored" on his birth certificate obtained from the New Orleans Board of Health. The 1880 census for New Orleans listed his parents as "mulatto". On reading this, African-American poet Ishmael Reed dedicated his 1972 novel Mumbo Jumbo to "George Herriman, Afro-American, who created Krazy Kat". Herriman came to be identified as Black or Creole in comics literature, including his first book-length biography, Krazy Kat: The Comic Art of George Herriman (1986), while the "Greek" label stuck with some biographers, and was used by Bill Blackbeard in his introductions to the Krazy and Ignatz volumes in the early 2000s. Later research at the New Orleans Public Library by cartoonist Brian Nelson showed that Herriman's maternal grandmother was born in Havana, Cuba, that all his relatives were listed as "mulatto" on the 1890 census, and that Herriman may also have had Spanish or Native American ancestry.

== Reception and legacy ==
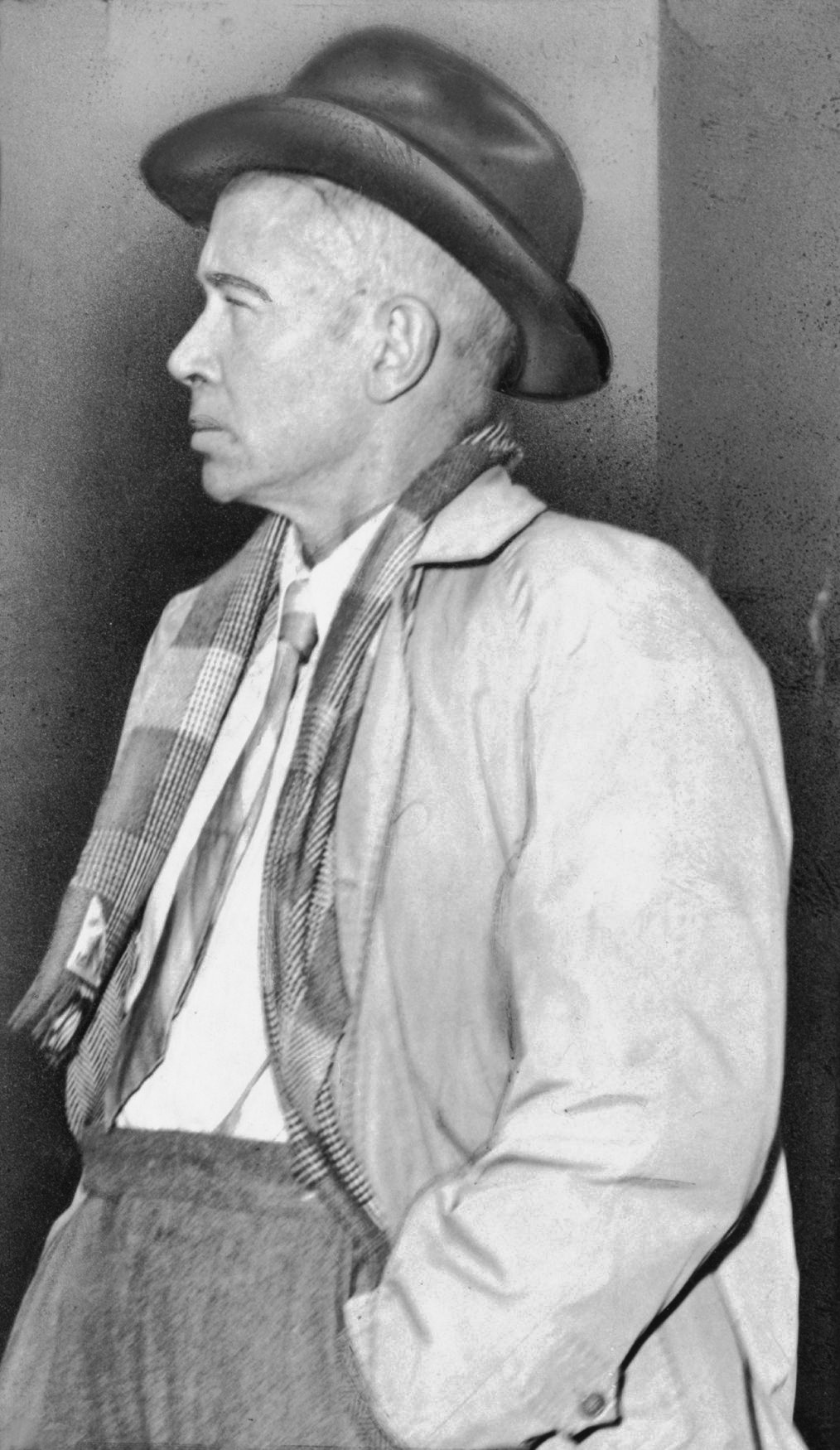
E. E. Cummings wrote the introduction to the first Krazy Kat book in 1946.

Krazy Kat was popular with intellectuals, artists and critics, (Note: Writers and artists such as T. S. Eliot, Pablo Picasso, Gertrude Stein Joan Miró, Jack Kerouac, E. E. Cummings, Fritz Lang and Umberto Eco expressed their love of Krazy Kat.) and in the 1920s Herriman's modernist touches received praise. In 1921, composer John Alden Carpenter, who had long been an admirer of Herriman's work, approached him to collaborate on a Krazy Kat ballet. President Woodrow Wilson refused to miss any installment of Krazy Kat, and would take it into cabinet meetings.

Writer E. B. White praised Herriman's illustrations for Archy and Mehitabel. Cartoonist Edward Sorel wrote that Krazy Kat's lack of popularity later in its run was largely due to Hearst's editorial policies, in that the "lowbrow" readership at whom he aimed his papers was unlikely to appreciate Herriman's style of work, though Hearst personally championed the strip. Following Herriman's death, the strip was discontinued, unlike most popular strips which were continued by other cartoonists after their creators' deaths. His stature was such that decades after his death, his work was displayed in art galleries.

Critics found Herriman's work difficult to classify and contextualize; Seldes, E. E. Cummings, and writers Adam Gopnik and Robert Warshow were among critics who tempered their enthusiasm for the strip with qualifications about its perceived naïveté and its "lowbrow" origins on the comic strip page.

The strip has had a lasting influence on a large number of cartoonists. Mutts creator Patrick McDonnell calls Krazy Kat one of his foremost influences, and is co-author of Krazy Kat: The Comic Art of George Herriman (1986). Will Eisner discovered Herriman's comics when he was selling newspapers in the 1930s and called Krazy Kat "the big strong influence" on his own work. Art Spiegelman called Herriman one of his "conscious influences". Herriman's widespread influence on American underground comix, particularly his shape-shifting, psychedelic backgrounds, lack of respect for convention and his irreverence, is evident in the work of Robert Crumb, Denis Kitchen, and Bobby London. Journalist Paul Krassner called Crumb "the illegitimate offspring of Krazy Kat". Cartoonist Chris Ware was so taken with Herriman's work he made a pilgrimage to Monument Valley to see the desert landscapes that inspired much of Herriman's art.

I always thought if I could do something as good as Krazy Kat, I would be happy. Krazy Kat was always my goal.

— Charles M. Schulz in 1967

Krazy Kat was a primary influence on other cartoonists such as Charles M. Schulz of Peanuts, Bill Watterson of Calvin and Hobbes, and the Italian Massimo Mattioli. Walt Kelly paid homage to Herriman in some of his Pogo strips. Dr. Seuss expressed fondness for Krazy Kat, and children's literature scholar Philip Nel has detected Herriman's influence in Seuss's works, especially in his zig-zagging, Coconino County-like backgrounds. Multimedia artist Öyvind Fahlström appropriated Krazy Kat in a series of works from 1963 to 1965. Jay Cantor published a postmodern novel in 1987 called Krazy Kat: A Novel in Five Panels, in which the retired Krazy and Ignatz contemplate a comeback in a post-atomic world.

Since 1997, the Small Press Expo has held the annual Ignatz Awards in honor of Herriman's mouse from Krazy Kat. It recognizes talent in independent comics publishing. Krazy Kat was ranked first on The Comics Journal's list of the greatest comics of the twentieth century. The Society of Illustrators inducted Herriman into its Hall of Fame in 2013.

== Work ==
=== Style ===
Within the seeming strictures of the strip—the recurring characters, the Krazy–Ignatz–Offisa Pupp love triangle—Herriman improvised freely with the story, the shifting backgrounds, and the sex of the Krazy Kat's title character. Among the multicultural influences Herriman mixed in his work were those of the Navajo and Mexican. He made creative use of language with a poetical sense, employing multilingual puns in a fanciful mix of dialects from different ethnic backgrounds. Herriman used metafictional techniques associated with postmodernism; his characters were self-aware, he frequently drew attention to himself and his drawings as drawings in his strips, and he emphasized the subjectivity of language and experience.

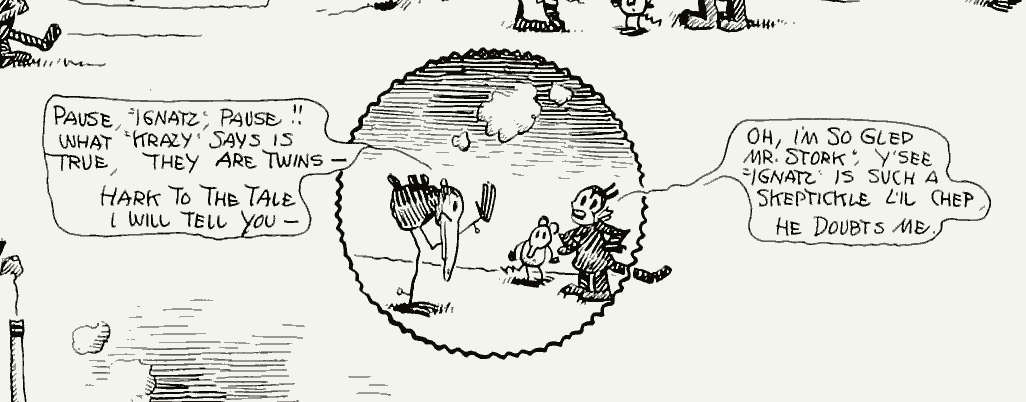
Herriman played with page structures, as with this circular panel, surrounded by borderless panels. He drew with a loose, spontaneous line, and had his characters speak in dialect-heavy, poetic dialogue.

Herriman drew with what cartoonist Edward Sorel called a "liberated, spontaneous-looking style ... a cartoon counterpart of expressionism". It was organic, and his pen strokes had a dynamic, thick-and-thin range which Sorel describes as instantly recognizable and difficult to imitate. The Krazy Kat Sunday pages showed Herriman experimenting most freely—each had a unique panel layout and logo, and the jumbled panels could be circles, irregular shapes, or borderless. In his last few years, Herriman's arthritis led to an ever-scratchier style of art; he used a knife to scratch out whites from inked surfaces, giving the artwork the look of a woodcut.

=== Collections ===
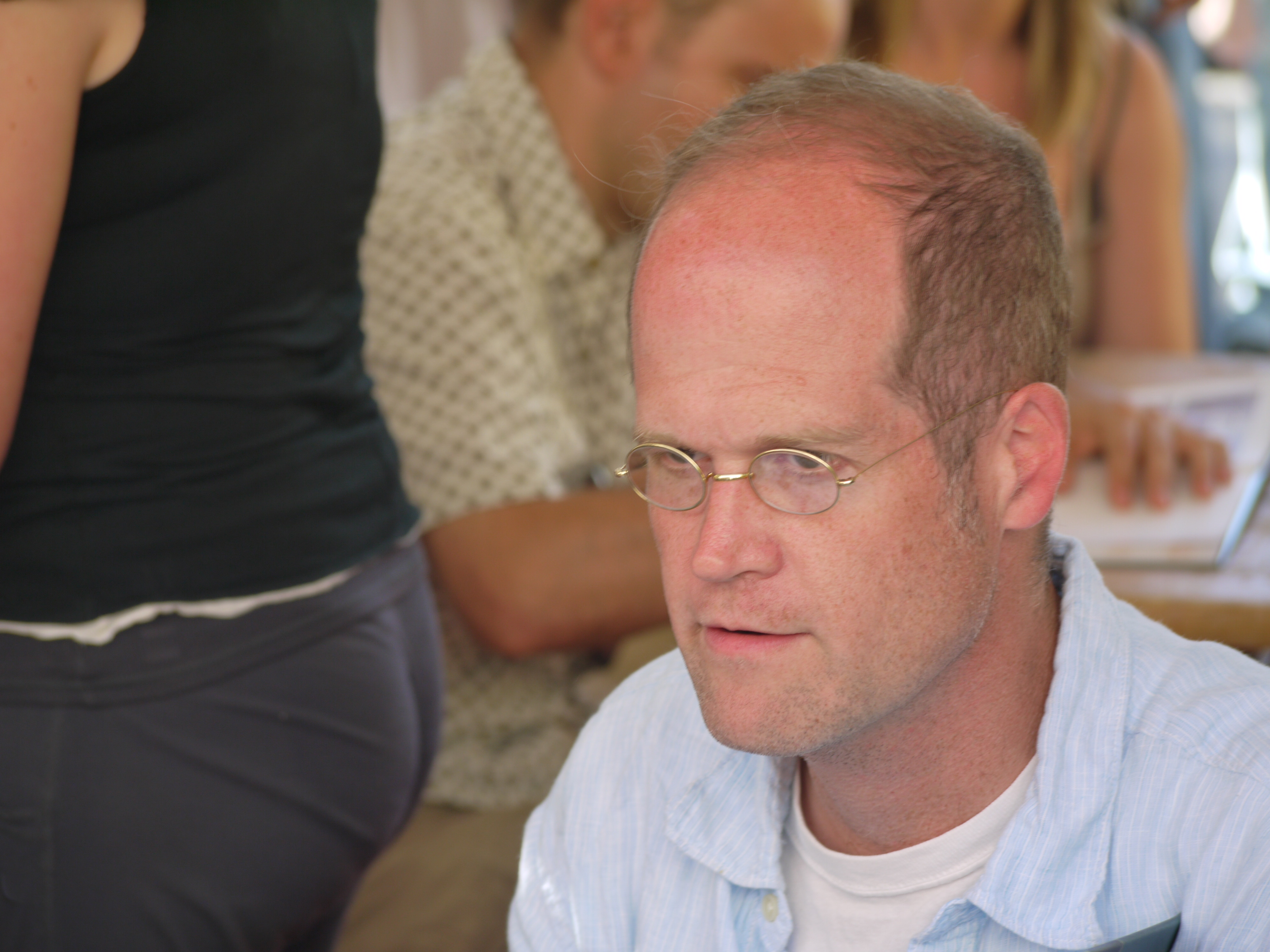
Chris Ware designed the complete Krazy Kat Sundays series Krazy and Ignatz.

Krazy Kat has been collected in a variety of formats over the years, though Herriman's other strips have been less frequently reprinted. George Herriman's Krazy Kat (1946) was the first Krazy Kat collection; it featured an introduction by poet E. E. Cummings. (Note: Cummings had attended Harvard University with Gilbert Seldes.) Comics historian Bill Blackbeard began compiling a complete collection of Krazy Kat Sundays beginning in 1988, but the publisher Eclipse Comics went bankrupt in 1992, before the series was complete. Blackbeard's thirteen-volume Krazy and Ignatz series was published by Fantagraphics Books beginning in 2002, and was designed by Chris Ware. In 2010, Sunday Press Books released Krazy Kat: A Celebration of Sundays, which reprinted a selection of Krazy Kat Sundays and some of Herriman's pre-Krazy Kat work in a 14-by-17-inch (36 cm × 43 cm) format, which approximated the original printed size of the strips. In 2012, IDW began issuing a three-volume Baron Bean reprinting, and Fantagraphics will release George Herriman's Stumble Inn. Fantagraphics has also announced plans to collect the complete Krazy Kat dailies at an unspecified time.

== See also ==
Multiracial Americans

=== List of comic strips ===
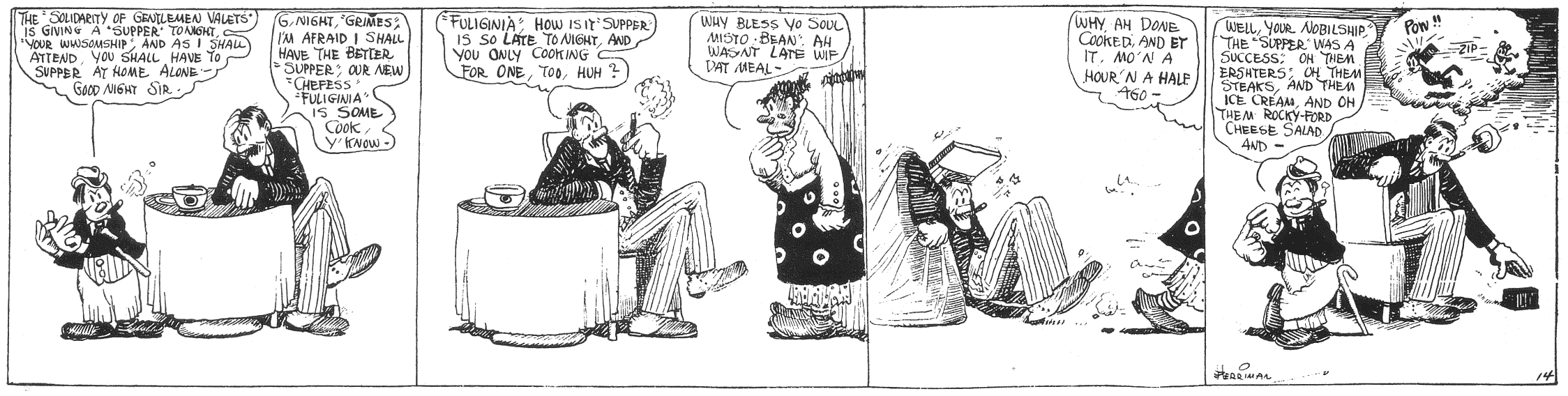
Herriman had many long- and short-lived comic strips. (Baron Bean daily for Friday, April 14, 1916, subtitled "We Fear Grimes's Employer Is a Bit Peevish")

Comic strips by George Herriman
Title	Begin date	End date
Musical Mose	February 16, 1902	March 9, 1902
Professor Otto and his Auto	March 30, 1902	December 28, 1902
Acrobatic Archie	April 13, 1902	January 25, 1903
Two Jollie Jackies	January 11, 1903	November 15, 1903
Lariat Pete (Note: Taken over by Herriman)	September 6, 1903	November 15, 1903
Major Ozone's Fresh Air Crusade	January 2, 1904	October 20, 1906
Home Sweet Home	February 22, 1904	March 4, 1904
Bud Smith	October 29, 1905	October 20, 1906
Grandma's Girl	November 26, 1905	May 12, 1906
Rosy Posy, Mama's Girl	May 19, 1906	September 15, 1906
Mr. Proones the Plunger	December 10, 1907	December 26, 1907
Baron Mooch	October 12, 1909	December 19, 1909
Alexander the Cat	November 7, 1909	January 9, 1910
Daniel and Pansy	November 21, 1909	December 4, 1909
Mary's Home from College	December 20, 1909	January 10, 1910
Gooseberry Sprig	December 23, 1909	January 24, 1910
The Dingbat Family/The Family Upstairs	June 20, 1910	January 4, 1916
Krazy Kat	October 28, 1913	June 25, 1944
Baron Bean	January 5, 1916	January 22, 1919
Now Listen Mabel	April 23, 1919	December 18, 1919
Stumble Inn	October 30, 1922	January 9, 1926
Us Husbands	January 16, 1926	December 18, 1926
Mistakes Will Happen (Note: Ran as a "topper" to Us Husbands)	January 16, 1926	December 18, 1926
Embarrassing Moments/Bernie Burns (Note: Begun in 1922, taken over by Herriman in 1928)	April 28, 1928	December 3, 1932
