= B word =

The "B" word is a euphemism generally used to replace a profane word starting with the letter b. The profanity in question may be:

- Bitch (slang)
- Bastard (slang)
- Bollocks
- Beaner
