= Beane =

Beane may refer to:

- Beane (surname)
- Beane (singer), a contestant in season 19 of American Idol
- River Beane, a river in Hertfordshire, England

== See also ==
- Bean (disambiguation)
