= Denney =

Denney may refer to:

- Denney, Territoire de Belfort, a commune in Belfort department, France
- Denney (surname), people with the surname Denney
