= Beene =

Beene is a surname. Notable people with the surname include:

- Andy Beene (born 1956), baseball player
- Fred Beene (born 1942), baseball player
- Geoffrey Beene (1924–2004), fashion designer
- Hon. Mohamud Abdirahman Sheikh Farah Beene-Beene (1979-present), political figure

== See also ==
- Beanie (disambiguation)
- Been (disambiguation)
- Beane (surname)
- Beeney (surname)
- Beeny (surname)
- Oliver Beene, television show
