= Beaner Lake =

- Location within Washington (state)
- Location: Okanogan County, Washington
- Coordinates: 48°26′43″N 120°37′39″W
- Type: Lake
- Basin countries: United States
- Surface elevation: 6,119 ft (1,865 m)

Beaner Lake is a lake in Okanogan County, Washington, in the United States.

The name of the lake has been criticized in the media for containing the ethnic slur beaner.

== See also ==
- List of lakes in Washington
