= The Dingbat Family =

American comic strip

- Author: George Herriman
- Launch date: July 20, 1910
- End date: January 4, 1916
- Alternate name: The Family Upstairs
- Syndicate(s): King Features Syndicate
- Genre: Gag-a-day
- Followed by: Krazy Kat

The Dingbat Family (also The Family Upstairs) is a comic strip by American cartoonist George Herriman that ran from June 20, 1910, to January 4, 1916. It introduced Herriman's most famous pair of characters: Krazy Kat and Ignatz Mouse, who later featured in Herriman's best-known strip Krazy Kat (1913–1944).

== Publication and history ==
George Herriman moved from California to New York to work for the New York Evening Journal. Six days after his arrival, Herriman began the daily strip The Dingbat Family, starring E. Pluribus Dingbat and his family.

From July 27, 1910, to November 15, 1911, the strip ran under the title The Family Upstairs. During this period, the Dingbats fruitlessly attempted to deal with their irritating, noisy neighbors who lived in the apartment above them; the family upstairs was never seen in the strip. The original title returned after the strip of November 15, 1911, when the Dingbats' building was demolished to make room for a department store and they and their upstairs nemeses parted paths.

Critics do not regard the strip highly, but it provided the vehicle for a fruitful situation: a cat-and-mouse that began as filler in the bottom of the strip's panels and later graduated to a tier of its own at the bottom of the strip. In the episode for July 26, 1910, the mouse threw a pebble (not yet the famous brick) at the family cat—called "Kat"—which hit the cat on the head. The antics of this mouse and "Kat" continued to appear in the bottom portion of The Dingbat Family. Herriman said he did this "to fill up the waste space". About a month after its first appearance, the "Kat" crept up on the sleeping mouse and kissed it loudly. The mouse awoke saying, "I dreamed an angel kissed me", while the "Kat" crept away and said, "Sweet thing". In July 1912, while Herriman had the Dingbats on vacation, Krazy Kat and Ignatz Mouse took over the strip, which was retitled Krazy Kat and I. Mouse for the duration. On October 28, 1913, Krazy Kat debuted as an independent strip on the daily comics page.

The Dingbat Family ended January 4, 1916, and Herriman replaced it the next day with Baron Bean (1916–1919).

== Reprints ==
- The Family Upstairs, By George!, Volume Two, edited by Bill Blackbeard, Nov. 25, 1910 to Feb. 15, 1911, SPEC Productions, includes the first appearances of Ignatz, Krazy, and the Family Upstairs.
- The Family Upstairs, By George!, Volume Three, edited by Bill Blackbeard, Sept. 12, 1910 to Nov 23, 1910, SPEC Productions.
- The Family Upstairs, By George!, Volume Four, edited by Bill Blackbeard, Nov. 25, 1910 to Feb 15, 1911, Spec Productions.
