= McBean (disambiguation) =

McBean is a surname.

McBean may refer to:

== Places ==
- McBean, Georgia, U.S.
- McBean Pound, South Australia, Australia
- McBean Formation, a geologic formation in South Carolina, U.S.

== Other uses ==
- Gladding, McBean, a ceramics company in Lincoln, California, U.S.
- James McBean Residence, a house in Rochester, Minnesota, U.S. designed by Frank Lloyd Wright
- McBean Cottage, historic cottage at Saranac Lake in Harrietstown, New York, U.S.
- McBean Regional Transit Center, a transit center in Santa Clarita, California, U.S.

== See also ==
- Old Providence McBean Lagoon National Natural Park, Providencia Island, Colombia
- Walter and McBean Galleries, San Francisco, U.S.
- Bean (disambiguation)
- Beaner (disambiguation)
