= Beanos =

Second-hand record shop in England

Coordinates: 51.3734°N 0.1011°W

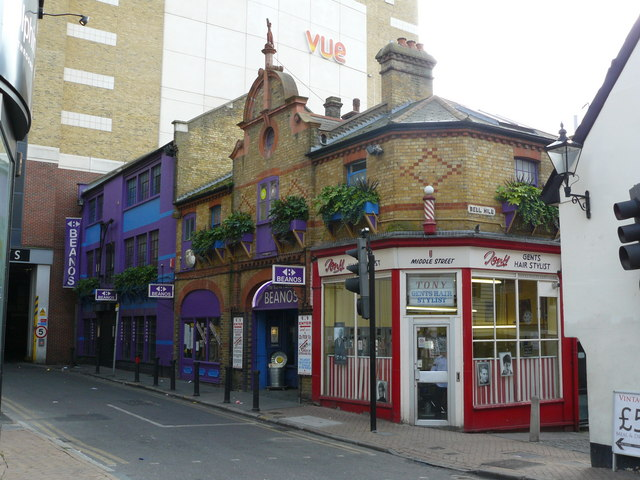
Beanos (left) in 2009

Beanos was a second-hand record shop, once the largest in Europe, located in the South London borough of Croydon. It was founded by musician David Lashmar in 1975 and continued to expand through three increasingly larger shops, ending up in an old printing works in Middle Street in the 1990s.

After over thirty years of trading, Beanos faced the threat of closure in 2006, although the immediate threat was averted by concentrating the store's focus on rare vinyl records, rather than compact discs which were being undercut by large music chains and supermarkets. Lashmar also closed the top two floors as a cost-cutting measure. However, in November 2008 Lashmar announced that the store would have to close by the end of the year as sales had not picked up, and the shop closed in July 2009 after another dealer bought the stock.

In January 2010, Lashmar reopened Beanos as STUFF marketplace, which officially closed on 30 April 2010 due to lack of business. In December 2010, Lashmar appeared in the BBC television series Turn Back Time – The High Street as a 1970s record shop owner trying to sell vinyl records to 21st-century customers.

After the short lived STUFF venture, the site was then host to Beanies, a child-friendly cafe also offering play areas and workshops, for several years, before this too ceased operations. As of 2018 the building is now home to Project B, a venue for hire to host private events.

Beanos provided 8,000 records for the 2009 film The Boat That Rocked and was the filming location for Lawrence Pearce's comedy film Mixed Up.
