= Beeny (surname) =

Beeny is a surname.

== People ==
Notable people with the surname include:

- Bill Beeny (1926–2022), American Baptist minister
- Christopher Beeny (1941–2020), British actor and dancer
- Sarah Beeny (born 1972), British broadcaster and entrepreneur

== Fictional characters ==
- Judge Beeny, a character from 2000 A.D. and Judge Dredd

== See also ==
- Beanie (disambiguation)
- Beene (surname)
- Beeney (surname)
