= Turn Back Time – The High Street =

- Directed by: Fergus Colville
- Starring: Gregg Wallace; Juliet Gardiner; Tom Herbert
- Narrated by: Hugh Bonneville
- Country of origin: United Kingdom
- Original language: English
- No. of series: 1
- No. of episodes: 6

Production
- Producers: Tom St John Gray; Morgana Pugh
- Running time: 60 minutes
- Production company: Wall to Wall Media (production company)

Original release
- Network: BBC One
- Release: 2 November – 7 December 2010

Turn Back Time – The High Street is a 2010 British reality documentary television series. The show started airing on BBC One on 2 November 2010 and ran for 6 episodes. The series is based and filmed in Shepton Mallet in Somerset, and sees four families experience life on the high street in various eras, namely the Victorian era, Edwardian era, 1930s, Second World War, 1960s and 1970s.

The series is narrated by Hugh Bonneville. Gregg Wallace, Juliet Gardiner and Tom Herbert are also involved in the series as the "Chamber of Commerce", keeping an eye on the activities of the families.

== Episodes ==
Episode	
1	Victorian Era
2	Edwardian Era
3	1930s (Peace Time)
4	World War II
5	1960s
6	1970s

== The Shopkeepers ==
- Grocers
  - Karl and Debbie Sergison own a delicatessen in real life. They are joined by daughter Saffron (13) and Karl's son Harry (22) Featured in all episodes.
- Bakers
  - Caroline and Nigel Devlin are joined by their children Jack (15), Raiff (13), Saffron (12) and Chloe (9). Featured in episodes 1–5.
- Butchers
  - Andrew Sharp and his son Michael (14) are featured in episodes 1–5.
- Ironmonger
  - Simon Grant-Jones is a professional blacksmith and is featured in episodes 1–4.
- Dressmaker
  - Gillian “Gill” Cockwell is featured in episodes 2–6.
- Record Shop
  - David Lashmar (previous owner of second-hand record shop Beanos) is featured in episode 6.
- Convenience Store
  - Sunder and Pam Sandher are joined by children Karina (16) and Josh (12). They are featured in episode 6.

Shop Names
	Victorian	Edwardian	1930s	1940s	1960s	1970s
Grocers	Sergisons Grocery Store	Sergison's	Sergison's Grocer & Confectioner	Sergison's Grocer & Confectioner	Sergison's Grocer	SergiSave
Bakers	N. Devlin, Baker	Devlin's Tea Room	Devlin's Bakers & Cake Shop	Devlin's Bakers	Caroline's Milk Bar	N/A
Butchers	Sharp & Son	Sharp & Son	Sharp's Family Butcher	Sharp's Family Butcher	Sharp's General Store	N/A
Ironmonger	Ironmonger, S. Grant-Jones & Co	Penny Bazaar	Grant-Jones, Toys & Games	S. Grant-Jones Hardware	N/A	N/A
Dressmaker	N/A	G. Cockwell Dressmaker	Cockwell Fashion	Cockwell Fashion	Cockwell's Salon	Woo Who?
Record Shop	N/A	N/A	N/A	N/A	N/A	Lashmar's Records
Convenience Store	N/A	N/A	N/A	N/A	N/A	Sandher's General Store

== DVD ==
Turn Back Time: The High Street was released on 6 June 2012 by Acorn Media UK.
