= Enchanted Mesa =

Coordinates: 34°55′11″N 107°33′05″W

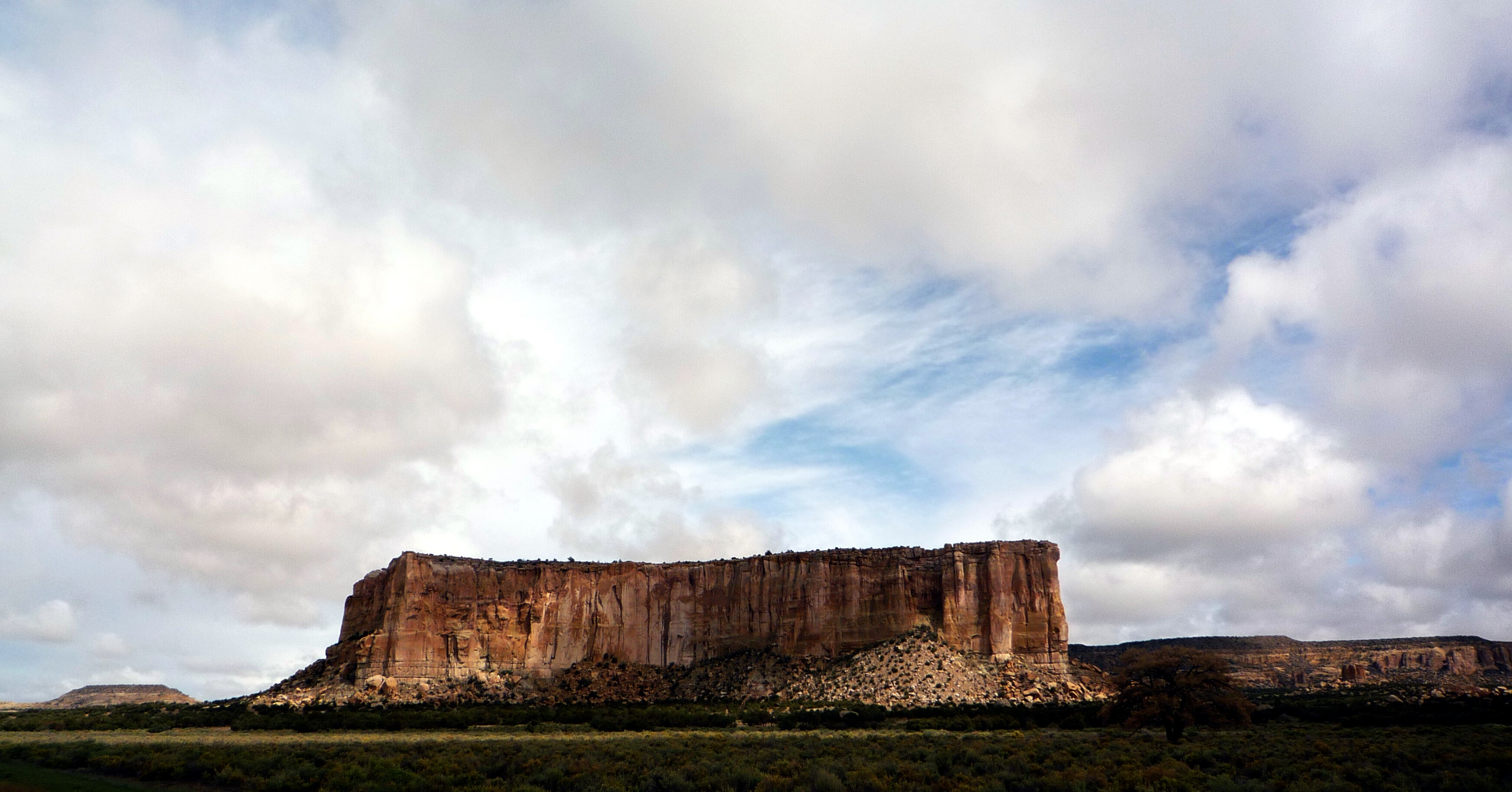
Enchanted Mesa in 2009

Enchanted Mesa is a sandstone butte in Cibola County, New Mexico, United States, about 2.5 miles (4.0 km) northeast of the pueblo of Acoma. It is called Mesa Encantada in Spanish and Katzimo or Kadzima in Keres. Acoma tradition says that Enchanted Mesa was the home of the Acoma people until a severe storm and landslide destroyed the only approach. There are no longer any ruins on the flat top. The butte is 430 ft (130 m) high, 1,250 ft (380 m) long and only 400 ft (120 m) ft wide, at its widest. The elevation at the top is 6,643 ft (2,025 m).

== History ==
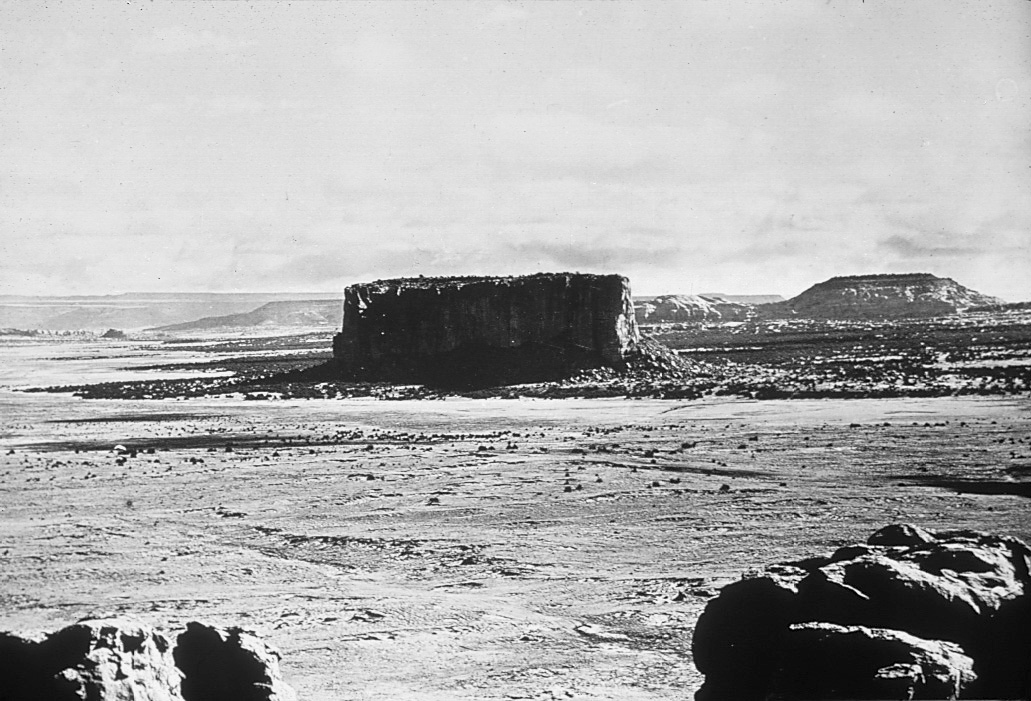
Photograph of Enchanted Mesa taken from Aa'ku – 1899

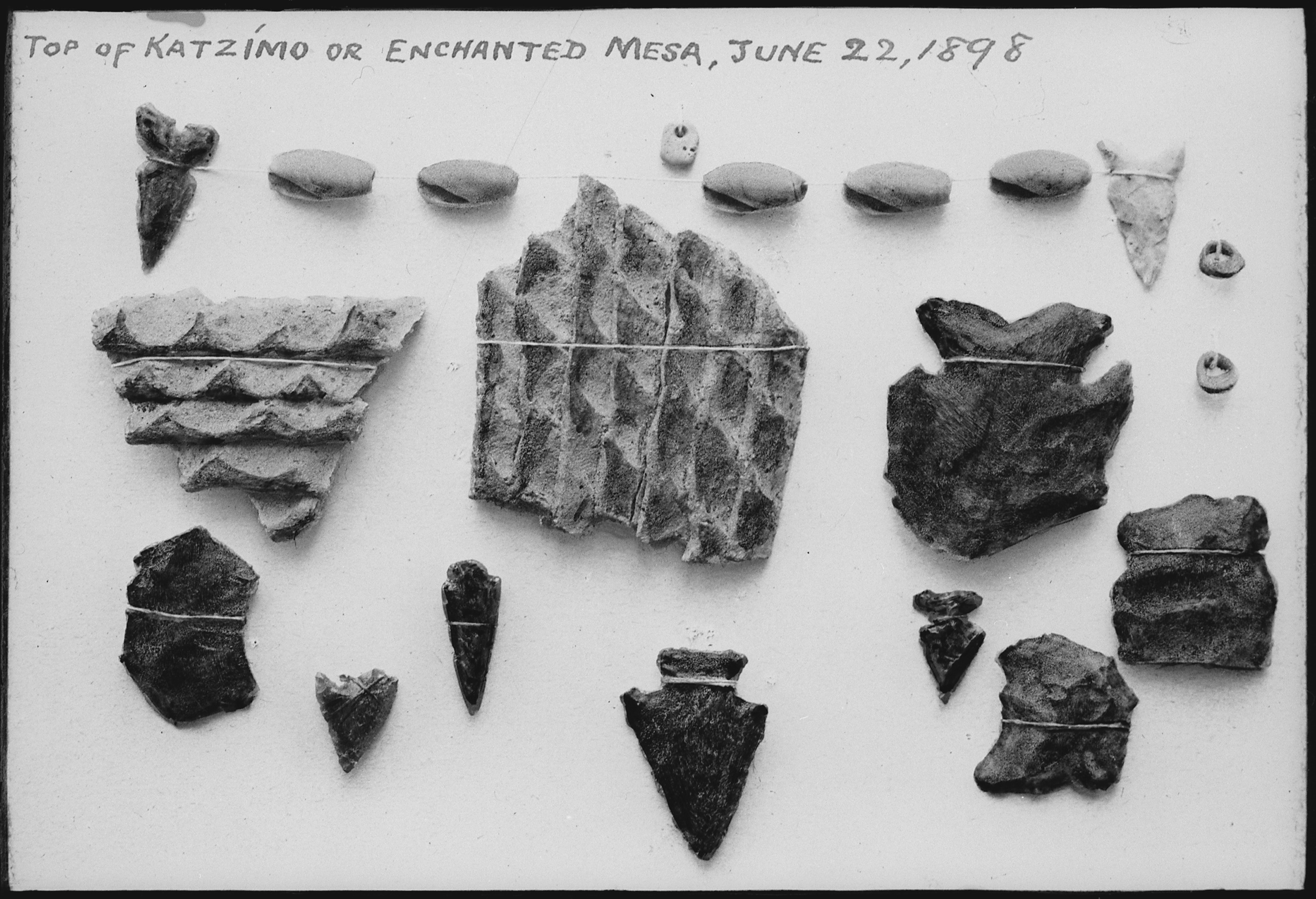
Indian artifacts found on the Enchanted Mesa, June 22, 1898

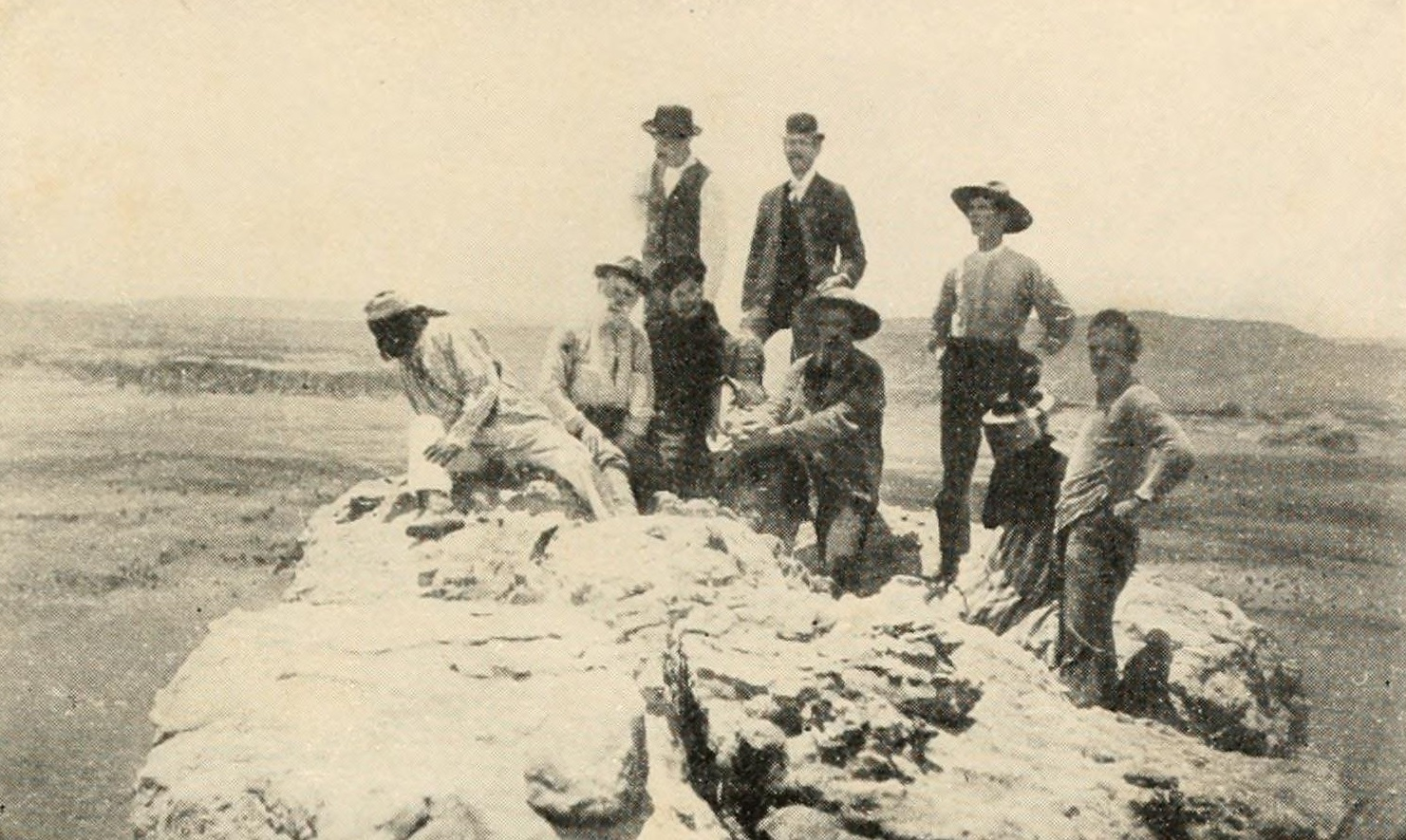
Lummis-Jordan party on top of Enchanted Mesa

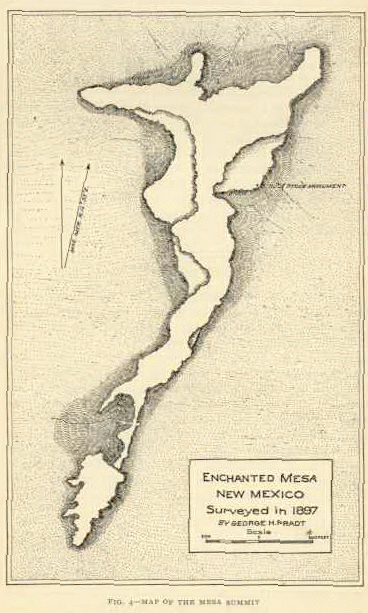
Map of Enchanted Mesa

In 1892, when Charles F. Lummis was visiting Acoma he listened to the old Indian governor, Martín Valle, who told the story of how the Acoma people used to live on Enchanted Mesa. Their access to the top was on the southern side where a large piece of the butte was said to have spalled off and formed a ramp, a "stone ladder", up to the top. After the ramp was damaged in a storm, access was by climbing a wooden ladder in a narrow fissure. Evidence of holes carved into the sandstone on either side of the fissure can be seen, located in the horseshoe shaped bowl at the southern end. The early inhabitants had a precipitous climb up the fissure, but it assured their safety. Into these holes were placed stout lengths of wood, the 'rungs' of the ladder. Today, this is still the only means of climbing access to the top of the mesa. Their fields, and the springs that were their water source, were in the valley. In the summer, the entire village would descend into the valley to tend the crops. One afternoon a severe thunderstorm washed away the "stone ladder", leaving only sheer rock faces all the way around the butte. Legend has it that three old women and a young boy had been left in the village, but they could not get down, nor could anyone else get back to the village. A giant thunderbird swooped down and scooped up the four and carried them to the valley floor. The Acoma people abandoned Enchanted Mesa and moved to White Rock Mesa, now called Acoma. In 1897, Professor William Libbey from Princeton University climbed Enchanted Mesa to disprove the existence of ruins. His team used a cannon to shoot a rope over the end of the butte and using a pulley pulled himself up in a marine life-saving chair. Libbey and a newspaperman climbed to the top, spent two to three hours exploring, and returned empty-handed. Libbey announced that he had seen no ruins or artifacts, saying "Romantic Indian legend can never stand the acid test of scientific investigation." Self-educated archaeologist Frederick Webb Hodge did not take Libbey's word for it. On a later 1897 expedition he reported evidence of occupation. Although the main ruins had been washed over the edge by centuries of thunderstorms, he found plenty of arrow points, stone tools, beads and pottery fragments lodged in crevices.

On 18 November 1974, an Acoma police officer indicated that he had seen a UFO over Enchanted Mesa. Over the next several days, other officers reported "a red light, faster than any aircraft". A helicopter was dispatched to the top with the governor of the pueblo and a police officer, but no direct evidence of a UFO was found.

== Geology ==
The massive cliffs are formed by the Zuni Sandstone and the butte is topped by the Dakota Sandstone.
