= Isabelle Bean =

British-Australian theosophist (1862 – 1939)

- Born: 1862; Salisbury
- Died: 14 May 1939
- Occupations: Theosophist, nurse

Isabelle Bean (née Gater, formerly Edelfelt and John; 1862 – 1939) was a nurse, theosophist and feminist in Australia. She was prominent in the promotion and advocacy of theosophy and women's advancement.

== Early life ==
Isabelle Gater was born in 1862 at Salisbury, Wiltshire, England, daughter of William John Gater, ironmonger, and his wife Elizabeth, née Knight.

== Nursing and theosophy ==
After training as a nurse, Gater migrated to Australia in the early 1880s, where in 1886 she married Erik Gustalf Edelfelt. She moved with him to New Guinea where, 'armed with her own revolver', she sometimes accompanied him on his travels, becoming known as 'an enterprising and courageous lady'. On her return to Australia, Isabelle undertook further training at the Women's Hospital in Melbourne, qualifying in obstetrics in 1894.

Following her husband's death in 1895, Isabelle joined the Theosophical Society in Australia, where she met William George John, whom she married in 1901. For 23 years, she was at the society's headquarters in Sydney, teaching classes in theosophy and speaking at Sunday meetings in the Sydney Domain. She also undertook social work around city wine bars and canvassed house-to-house on issues such as raising the age of consent. In 1908, she accompanied British social reformer, theosophist and women's rights activist Annie Besant on a national lecture tour of the Commonwealth.

Isabelle continued her involvement with the society after John's death, working as secretary to ventures such as the International Order of the Round Table and the Order of the Star of the East. In 1922, she married John's successor, John Willoughby Butler Bean. When he resigned from the society in 1924, Isabelle continued in public life as vice-president of the Queensland Women's Non-Party Association, a body devoted to developing social welfare through political pressure. She was also a Theosophical Order of Service delegate to the National Council of Women.

Isabelle Bean died of hypertensive cerebro-vascular disease in 1939, aged 76 or 77, and was cremated with the rites of the Theosophical Society.
