= Jonathan Bean (cricketer) =

English cricketer (born 1964)

Personal information
- Full name: Jonathan Dobing Bean
- Born: 20 August 1964 (age 62); Altrincham, Cheshire, England
- Batting: Right-handed
- Role: Occasional wicket-keeper

Domestic team information
- Years: Team
- 1990–2000: Cheshire

Career statistics
Competition	List A
Matches	8
Runs scored	77
Batting average	9.62
100s/50s	–/–
Top score	22
Balls bowled	–
Wickets	–
Bowling average	–
5 wickets in innings	–
10 wickets in match	–
Best bowling	–
Catches/stumpings	7/–
- Source: Cricinfo, 10 April 2011

Jonathan Dobing Bean (born 20 August 1964) is an English cricketer. Bean is a right-handed batsman who occasionally fields as a wicket-keeper. He was born in Altrincham, Cheshire.

Bean made his debut for Cheshire in the 1990 Minor Counties Championship against the Cornwall. Bean played Minor counties cricket for Cheshire from 1990 to 2000, including 80 Minor Counties Championship matches and 21 MCCA Knockout Trophy matches. In 1992, he made his List A debut against Gloucestershire in the NatWest Trophy. He played seven further List A matches for Cheshire, the last coming against Kent in the 1999 NatWest Trophy. In his eight List A matches, he scored 77 runs at a batting average of 9.62, with a high score of 22. In the field he took 7 catches.
