= Bean Creek (Salt River tributary) =

Stream in Missouri, U.S.

Coordinates: 39.2761512°N 91.8457224°W

Bean Creek is a stream in Audrain County in the U.S. state of Missouri. It is a tributary of the Salt River.

Bean Creek has the name of an early settler.

== See also ==
- List of rivers of Missouri
