= Biggby Coffee =

American coffee shop chain

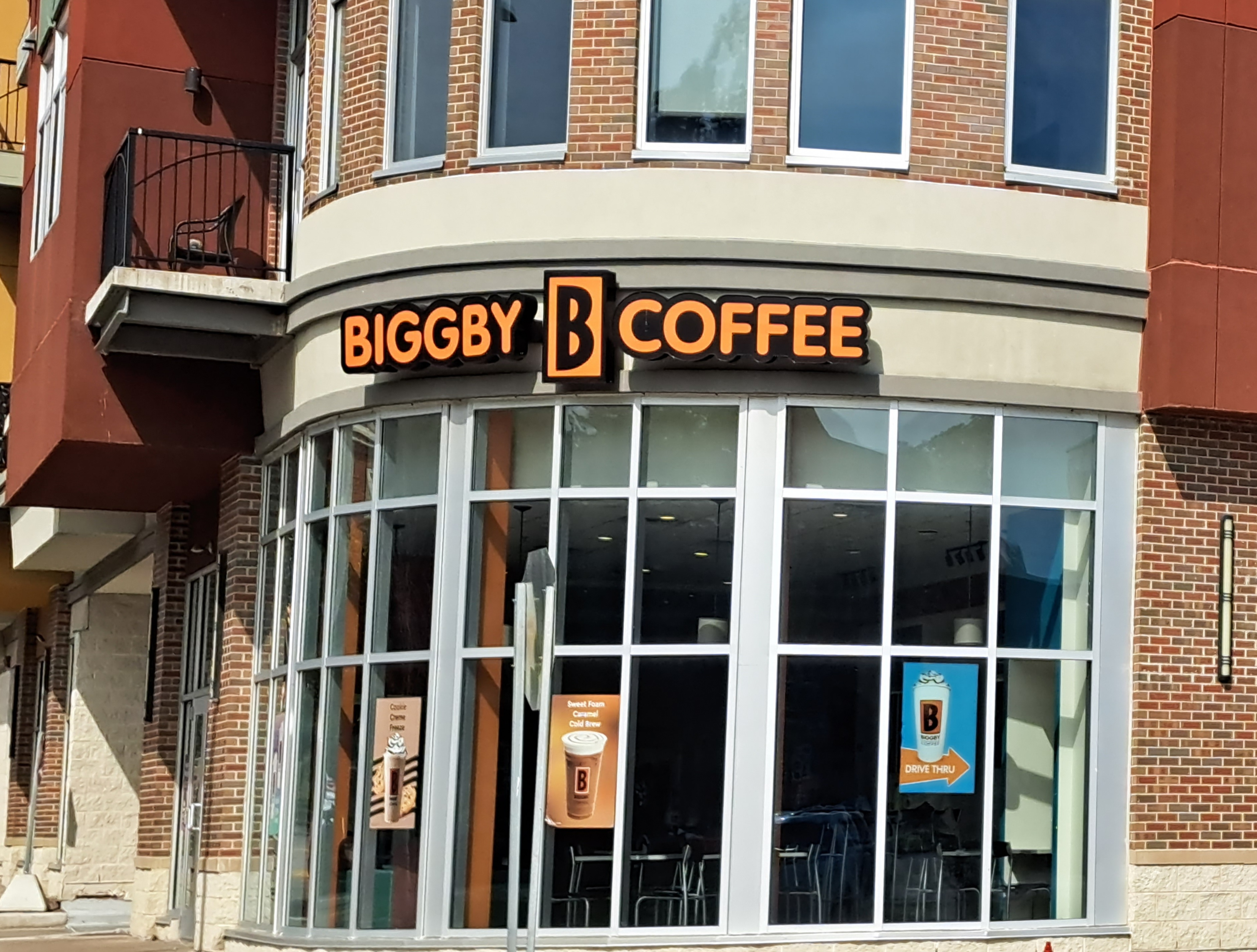
- Biggby Coffee, East Lansing, Michigan
- Type: Private
- Industry: Restaurants, franchising
- Founded: March 1995; 31 years ago, East Lansing, Michigan, U.S.
- Headquarters: East Lansing, Michigan, U.S.
- Number of locations: 470+ (September 2026)
- Key people: Robert Fish, Co-CEO, Michael McFall, Co-CEO
- Products: Coffee; Tea and Herbal teas; Made-to-order beverages; Assorted food; Bottled beverages; Smoothies; Merchandise; Franchising
- Website: www.biggby.com

Biggby Coffee (pronounced "big B") is an American coffeehouse franchise based in Lansing, Michigan, United States. It was founded in 1995 in the city of East Lansing, Michigan, by Bob Fish and Mary Roszel as Beaner's Coffee. By the end of the 1990s, the company had three locations in Lansing, and began to expand during the 21st century by means of franchising. Between 2007 and 2008, the chain was officially renamed Biggby Coffee due to corporate concerns over the meaning of the word "beaner"; the name Biggby was derived from the letter B in the company's logo. As of October 2026, the chain had over 470 locations in 13 states.

== History ==
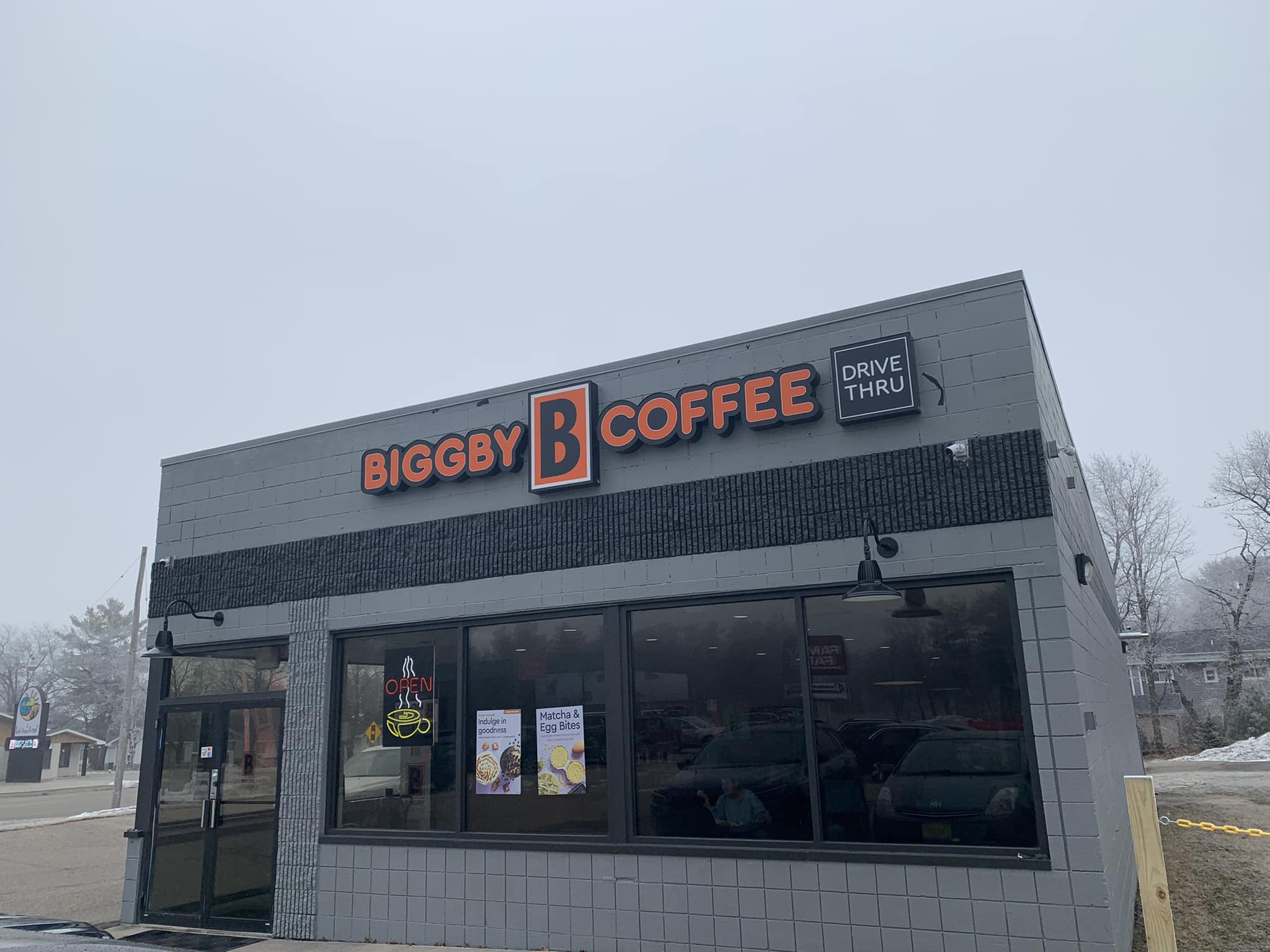
A Biggby Coffee location in Oscoda, Michigan

Co-founders Bob Fish and Mary Roszel met while attending hospitality courses at Michigan State University, and first worked together as managers of a Lansing, Michigan-based restaurant chain known as the Flap Jack. The first location opened in April 1995 on Grand River Avenue in East Lansing, Michigan, in a building previously occupied by an Arby's. Due to the success of the initial location, Fish and Roszel opened a second location in downtown Lansing, Michigan, in 1997. One year later, they also opened a corporate office in Lansing, allowing for sales of bulk coffee and coffee preparation.

Fish, Roszel, and Michael McFall (who was originally hired by Roszel as a barista in the first store) decided to franchise the company and founded Global Orange Development, LLC in June 1998. A third location opened in August 1999, also located on Grand River Avenue in East Lansing about 2 miles (3.2 km) east of the first. In the following four years, nine more locations were opened throughout Michigan and Ohio.

In late 2007, Fish announced that the chain would officially be renamed Biggby Coffee by January 2008. This decision was made due to concerns over the word "beaner" being a derogatory slang term for Mexican people. Company representatives conducted brand research for a year prior to this change, and chose the name Biggby Coffee due to the "big B" in the company's logo.

In July 2011, the company officially released a "new store footprint" that reduced the cost of opening a franchise location by approximately 40 percent. In September 2011, Biggby Coffee was the fastest-growing coffee chain in America by CNBC, which ranked the company number one based on their growth percentage from the previous year.

In August 2012, Roszel retired from the company after 17 years. Roszel was inducted by her Alma mater into Michigan State University's School of Hospitality Business Hall of Fame for her success with Biggby Coffee.
