= Beanie Ebert =

American football player (1902–1980)

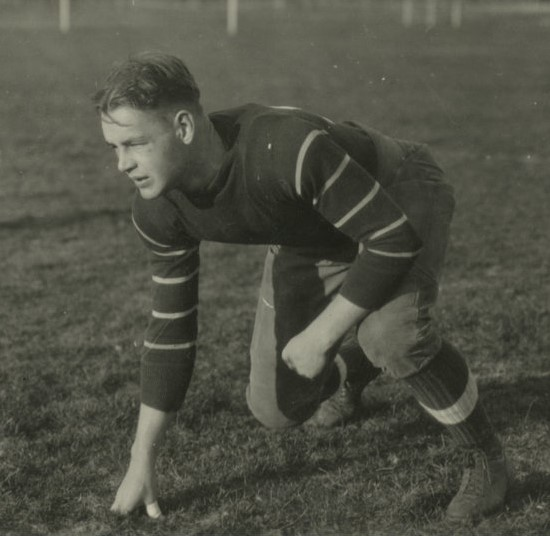
- Ebert at Carleton College

No. 20
- Positions: Guard, tackle, blocking back

Personal information
- Born: May 14, 1902; Alden, Minnesota, U.S.
- Died: March 24, 1980 (aged 77); Greenwich, Connecticut, U.S.
- Listed height: 5 ft 11 in (1.80 m)
- Listed weight: 198 lb (90 kg)

Career information
- High school: Aquinas (OH)
- College: Carleton

Career history

Playing
- Minneapolis Marines (1924)

Coaching
- Stillwater Area High School (1923–1925)

Career statistics
- Games played: 4
- Games started: 1
- Stats at Pro Football Reference

Head coaching record
- Regular season: 16–5–1 (.750)

Veryl Henry "Beanie" Ebert (May 14, 1902 – March 24, 1980) was an American football guard, tackle, and blocking back who played for the Minneapolis Marines of the National Football League (NFL) in 1924. He played in four games and started one. Ebert played college football for Carleton College. He was also a football coach at Stillwater Area High School in Oak Park Heights, Minnesota.

== Early life and education ==
Ebert was born on May 14, 1902, in Alden, Minnesota, where he grew up. According to Pro-Football-Reference.com, he attended Aquinas High School in Ohio. He attended Carleton College in Minnesota, (Note: Pro-Football-Reference.com states he attended Catholic University.) where he participated in football and wrestling. In football, Ebert played at the tackle position. He was a reserve football player under coach Claude J. Hunt in 1921. He was the Carleton starting left tackle in 1922 and was a "good" player, according to The Minneapolis Star.

Ebert majored in economics. He graduated as part of the class of 1923.

== Professional career ==
In mid-October 1924, Ebert was signed by the Minneapolis Marines of the National Football League (NFL) to play tackle. When Ebert was signed, the Marines had lost their first two games (0–3 versus the Duluth Kelleys on October 5; 0–13 against the Chicago Cardinals on October 12) and had not scored a single point. He was signed prior to their third game of the regular season, versus the 2–2 Green Bay Packers. Prior to their match with the Packers, he appeared as a substitute in a 7–2 exhibition win over the Ironwood Legion.

Against the Packers, Ebert (often misspelled as Eberts in game recaps) appeared as the backup to George Kramer at left guard. When Kramer took a break Ebert was substituted, and after Kramer came back Ebert was sent in as the substitute for tackle Les Scott in the second quarter. Being down 0–13 in the fourth quarter, the Marines put in Ebert to play quarterback. His first pass was a "long" attempt that fell incomplete. He attempted a second long pass on second down which also fell incomplete. A pass on third down by Ebert was batted down by Pro Football Hall of Famer Curly Lambeau. Later in the game, Ebert was sent in again at quarterback, and threw one pass that was batted down. The Packers won the game, 19–0.

After the loss to the Packers, the Marines traveled home to Minneapolis and faced the undefeated Duluth Kelleys, whom they had lost to earlier in the season. He only appeared briefly in the game, a 0–6 loss, as a substitute for George Kramer. The next match was a road game against the Milwaukee Badgers. Ebert started at right tackle against the Badgers, as the Marines lost by a score of 7–28.

The final regular season game for the Marines was against the Frankford Yellow Jackets, a 7–39 loss for Minneapolis. Ebert appeared as a substitute for center John Madigan in the game.

The Marines folded following the 1924 season, ending Ebert's professional football playing career. His weight while playing was 198 pounds (90 kg) and his height was 5 ft 11 in (1.80 m).

== Coaching career ==
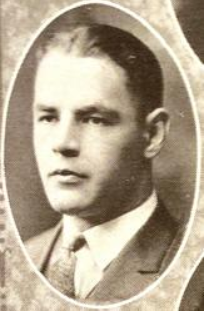
Ebert pictured as Stillwater coach in the Kabekonian.

In 1923, Ebert was hired by Stillwater Area High School to be head football coach.

The Brainard Daily Dispatch reported in September 1924 that the Ebert-coached Stillwater team "looks as though it will be one of the best that has represented this city in several years." The 1924 Stillwater team went 5–2–1, with wins over Hudson High School (40–0), St. Cloud High School (12–0), White Bear Lake Area High School (30–7), Hastings High School (33–0), and Humboldt Senior High School (53–7), losses against Northfield High School (0–9, in what was described as "one of the best games played here in years") and Cedar Rapids High School (6–26), and a tie to Winona High School (13–13).

Records are incomplete for the 1925 season, but an article in the Star Tribune stated they lost only one game. Ebert, along with 13 lettermen and seven players who started every game in 1925, left Stillwater in 1926. His record as head coach was 16–5–1, a .750 winning percentage.

== Later life and death ==
Ebert served in World War II. He later resided in Salem, Indiana and was a buyer for the F. W. Woolworth Company. He died on March 24, 1980, in Greenwich, Connecticut. He was 77 at the time of his death.

== Head coaching record ==
Year	Team	Overall	Conference	Standing	Bowl/playoffs
Stillwater Ponies (?) (1923–1925)
1923	Stillwater	?–2			
1924	Stillwater	5–2–1			
1925	Stillwater	?–1			
Stillwater:		16–5–1			
Total:		16–5–1			
