= Laura Schiff Bean =

American artist

Laura Schiff Bean (born in New York state), is a contemporary visual artist. Prior to becoming a career artist, she earned a degree in psychology from George Washington University and then worked in print advertising in Boston, Massachusetts. Laura Schiff Bean went on to get her Masters in Fine Arts (MFA) from School of the Museum of Fine Arts at Tufts. Her inspiration is derived from artists such as Lucien Freud, Jenny Saville, and Jim Dine.

Bean is known "for her dress 'portraits' painted with many layers of thick dripping paint." She tries to imbue the paintings with a sense of the wearer.

== Exhibitions ==
=== Solo/Collaborative ===
- 2021. REPRESENTATIONAL PAINTING, Gilman Contemporary, Ketchum ID 2020 EVOLVED, Gilman Contemporary, Ketchum, ID
- 2020 EVOLVED, Gilman Contemporary, Ketchum, ID
- 2018 UNTOLD STORIES, Gilman Contemporary, Ketchum Idaho
- 2017 THE WEIGHT OF WORDS, Blue Gallery, Kansas City, MO
- 2015 REDEFINED, Patricia Rovzar Gallery Seattle, WA
- 2014 DEFINED, Gilman Contemporary Ketchum, Idaho
- 2015 WITHOUT WORDS, Lanoue Gallery, Boston, MA
- 2013 Argazzi Art, Lakevill, CT
- 2012 "SHE COMES AND GOES AS SHE PLEASES" Gilman Contemporary, ID
- 2012 NEW WORK Argazzi Art, Lakeville, CT
- 2011 "24/7" Lanoue Fine Art, Boston, MA
- 2010 NEW WORK Pryor Fine Art, Atlanta
- 2010 Blue Gallery, KC, MO
- 2009 INTERSECTIONS: Between Dreams and Memory. Gallery One, Nashville.
- 2009 NEW WORK Bennett Street Gallery, Atlanta
- 2009 JOURNEY Lanoue Fine Art, Boston
- 2007 VISIONS: Contemporary Women Artists, Eleanor D. Wilson Museum, Hollins University. Roanoke, VA

=== Group ===
- 2018 Art Market San Francisco, Simon Breittbard Fine Arts, SF, CA
- 2018 Lanoue Gallery, Boston, MA
- 2017 DRESS MATTERS: CLOTHING AS METAPHOR - TUCSON MUSEUM OF ART, Tucson, AZ
- 2017 Lanoue Gallery, Boston, MA
- 2017 Georges Bergès Gallery, NY, NY- Summer Group show
- 2017 Georges Bergès Gallery, NY, NY
- 2016 Lanoue Fine Art
- 2016 Gilman Contemporary, Ketchum, ID
- 2015 Gilman Contemporary, Ketchum, ID
- 2015 Lanoue Fine Art, Boston, MA
- 2014 Lanoue Fine Art, Boston, MA
- 2014 Patricia Rovzar Gallery, Seattle, WA
- 2014 C Parker Gallery, CT "Yes She Can"
- 2013 Lanoue Fine Art, MA "A Few Of My Favorite Things"
- 2012 Argazzi Fine Art, Lakeville, CT
- 2012 Lanoue Fine Art, MA "Summer Salon Show"
- 2012 Rosenbaum Contemporary, Boca Raton, FL
- 2012 Floria/Forre, Aspen, CO
- 2012 Art MRKT San Francisco 2012
- 2012 Argazzi Fine Art, Lakeville, CT
- 2012 West Branch Gallery, Stowe, VT
- 2012 Forre Fine Art, Aspen/Vail, CO
- 2011 Gilman Contemporary, Ketchum Idaho
- 2011 Spring Group Show, Lanoue Fine Art
- 2011 Forre Fine Art, Aspen, CO
- 2010 Lanoue Fine Art, Boston, MA
- 2010 Blue Gallery, Kansas City, MO
- 2010 Lanoue Fine Art, Boston, MA
- 2009 Lanoue Fine Art, Boston, MA
- 2009 Bennett Street Gallery, Atlanta, GA
- 2008 Lanoue Fine Art, Boston, MA
- 2008 Bennett Street Gallery, Atlanta, GA
- 2008 Gallery One, Nashville, TN: 3 person show, "In Minds Eye"
- 2007 Cumberland Gallery, Nashville, TN "Packages Large & Small"
- 2007 Cumberland Gallery, Nashville, TN 2007 "Artists In Heat"
- 2007 Lanoue Fine Art, Boston, MA "VISIONS: Contemporary Female Artists"
- 2007 Lanoue Fine Art Boston, MA GroupShow
- 2006 Etheringon Fine Art, Vineyard Haven Group Show
- 2005 Windsor Gallery, Dania, FL Group Show
