= BEAN (charity) =

Non-profit organization

- Type: Non-profit
- Founded: 2002
- Founder: Howard Wu
- Headquarters: Seattle, Washington, U.S.
- Key people: Howard Wu, CEO
- Website: www.beanonline.org

BEAN, a non-profit organization based in Seattle, Washington, United States, encourages volunteerism for young professionals and benefits local and international charitable organizations. BEAN was founded in 2002 by Howard Wu. BEAN currently has chapters in Seattle, San Francisco, Phoenix, Minneapolis, New York, Philadelphia, Shanghai, Hong Kong and Seoul.
