= Vanilla Beane =

American milliner (1919–2022)

- Born: Vanilla Powell; September 13, 1919; Wilson, North Carolina, U.S.
- Died: October 23, 2022 (aged 103); Washington, D.C., U.S.
- Occupations: Milliner; fashion designer

Vanilla Powell Beane (born Vanilla Powell; September 13, 1919 – October 23, 2022), known as "DC's Hat Lady", was an American milliner and businesswoman. One of her hats was displayed and is in the collection of the National Museum of African American History and Culture (NMAAHC). Washington, D.C. observes Vanilla Beane Day on September 13.

== Early life ==
Beane was born in Wilson, North Carolina, on September 13, 1919, to Martha Hagans Powell and James Powell, the sixth of seven children. She worked on local farms which grew tobacco and cotton, and attended a single room school in Nash County, North Carolina. She graduated from Charles H. Darden High School in 1940, but as part of the class of 1938.

== Career ==
Beane moved to Washington, D.C. in the 1940s to follow her two sisters since there were more jobs available there. She married Willie George Beane in 1942, which she remarked on, at 99 years old, "I married a fellow, Willie Beane, and by my named [sic] being Vanilla, I came up with Vanilla Beane".

While working as an elevator operator at the Washington Millinery and Supply Company, she began making clothing – including hats – since she was around fabric, and was hired in 1955 as a seamstress. While working at the millinery shop she also had a job as mail clerk at the General Services Administration.

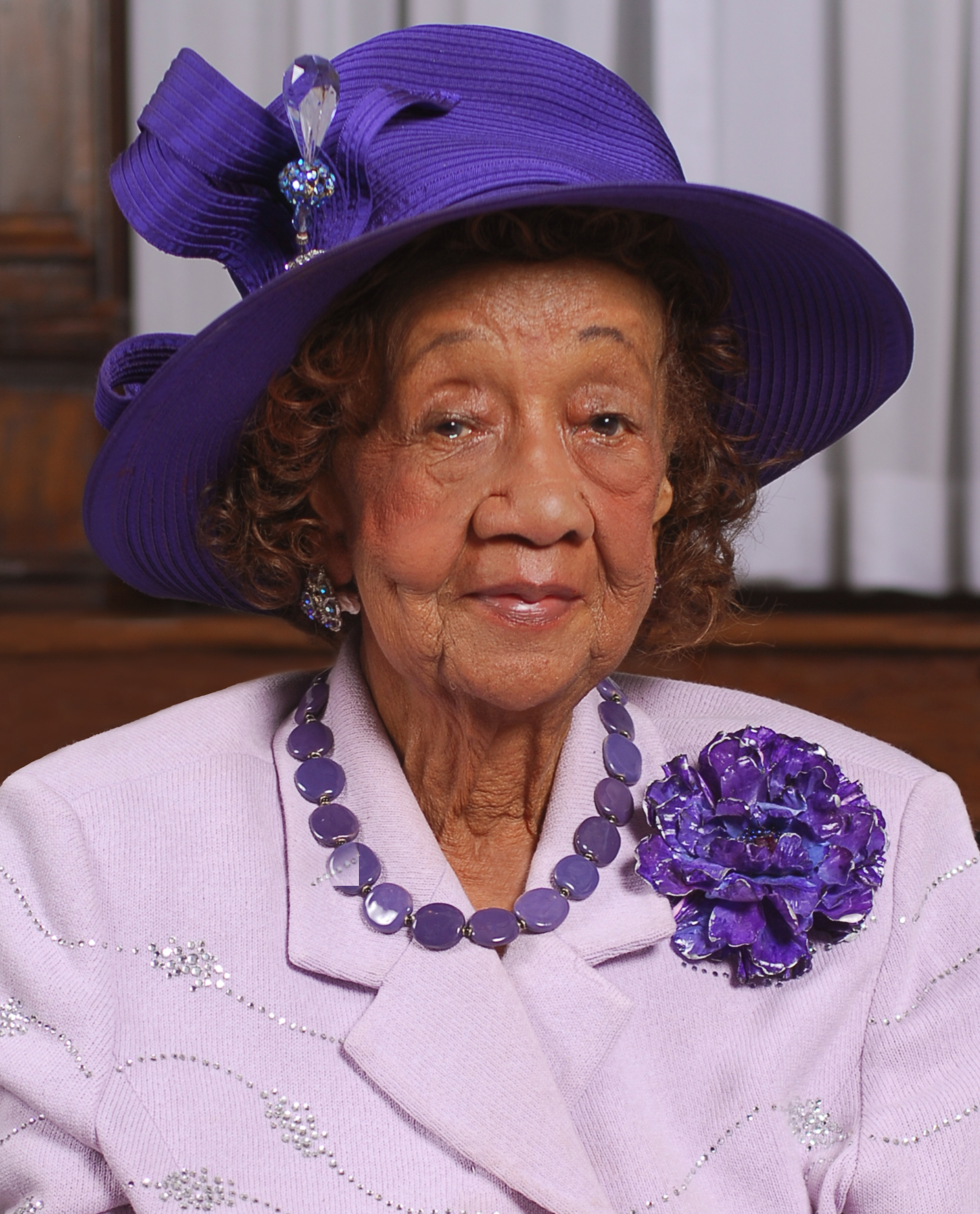
Dr. Dorothy Height in a Vanilla Beane hat

In 1975, she was inducted into the hall of fame of the National Association of Fashion and Accessory Designers, a trade group founded in 1949 in New York City for Black fashion professionals.

In 1979, when the millinery shop she worked at moved to Gaithersburg, Maryland, she bought its remaining supplies and fixtures and opened Bené Millinery & Bridal Supplies. In the Manor Park neighborhood in Ward 4, she served the local African American community. She continued working at her store multiple times a week even after her 100th birthday.

Throughout her career she made custom hats for local and national figures, including poet Maya Angelou and civil rights activist Dorothy Height; one of Beane's hats is featured on Height's USPS Forever stamp. One of her hats is in the permanent collection of the National Museum of African American History and Culture. The NMAAHC also features a detailed 3D scan of a green velveteen wrap hat from the 1950–1960s.

The government of Washington, D.C. designated September 13 Vanilla Beane Day in her honor.

== Death ==
Beane died on October 23, 2022, at age 103, in Washington, D.C. Mayor Muriel Bowser announced her death in a statement and said

Ms. Vanilla Beane embodied Black excellence. ... She was DC's Hat Lady. She was a mother, a grandmother, and a great grandmother. She was an inspiration for generations of Black women and for anyone who ever thought about turning their talent into a business that you love so much you stay at it into your hundreds.

She had three children; the eldest died in 1980, and her husband died in 1993.
