= Seeney =

Seeney is a surname. Notable people with the surname include:

- Angela Seeney, British energy engineer
- Daphne Seeney (1933–2020), Australian tennis player
- Jeff Seeney (born 1957), Australian politician

== See also ==
- Deeney
- Seeley (surname)
