= Lawrence Pearce =

Lawrence Pearce is a film screenwriter, director and author. He was born in London in 1980.

Lawrence Pearce attended the world renowned Chelsea College of Art and Design, now known as the University of the Arts London (UAL), before completing 3 years at film school. Within 5 months of graduating, he was offered a Director's position at Wideboys Film and Television, a London post-production facility. Clients included Sony, CNN, The National Geographic, Uri Geller Enterprises, and BBC World/News, among others.

Pearce departed to direct several well-received documentaries and television shows including Acting Up!, Between the Covers (presented-led book program with Simon Cowell's brother Tony), indie music videos and short films. His last two short films were screened at several International festivals and were both broadcast regularly on Sky.

Pearce then wrote, executive produced and directed the micro-budget horror Night Junkies, which starred Katia Winter (Sleepy Hollow, Fox series) and was distributed by Allumination and Content Media, now known as Kew Media, worldwide on DVD and digital in 2007. It became a divisive underground hit with cult audiences. Thereafter, Lawrence pursued business in other industries over a 10-year departure from the film industry.

In 2017 he returned to film as a matured screenwriter and executive producer, with several projects in development. He sold Drone (science fiction movie) to Yale Productions for a $15 million budgeted production set for 2020. Other projects in development are Lost Inside (psychological ghost thriller), Alpha (action science fiction) and Cain's Awakening (action/thriller).

Pearce has written two novels, The Haunted Hikikomori in 2013 and Need Love in 2014. He also wrote a graphic novel titled Cain's Awakening (working with Brodie's Law and 2000 AD artist David Bircham), which has since been adapted into another feature film screenplay and project in development.
