= Justice Bean =

Justice Bean may refer to:

- Henry J. Bean (1853–1941), chief justice of the Oregon Supreme Court
- Robert S. Bean (1854–1931), chief justice of the Oregon Supreme Court
