= Scott Bean =

Zimbabwean cricketer (born 1976)

Personal information
- Full name: Scott Douglas Bean
- Born: 27 January 1976 (age 50); Salisbury, Rhodesia
- Batting: Right-handed
- Bowling: Right-arm medium

Domestic team information
- Years: Team
- 1994/95–1995/96: Mashonaland Under-24s / Young Mashonaland

Career statistics
Competition	FC
Matches	5
Runs scored	132
Batting average	16.50
100s/50s	0/0
Top score	48
Balls bowled	156
Wickets	3
Bowling average	31.00
5 wickets in innings	0
10 wickets in match	0
Best bowling	3/50
Catches/stumpings	0/–
- Source: ESPNcricinfo, 20 July 2021

Scott Douglas Bean (born 27 January 1976) is a former Zimbabwean cricketer. Born in Salisbury (now Harare), he is a right-handed batsman and a right-arm medium pace bowler. In 1995, he played five first-class matches for Mashonaland Under-24s / Young Mashonaland in the Logan Cup.
