= Baron Bean =

American comic strip

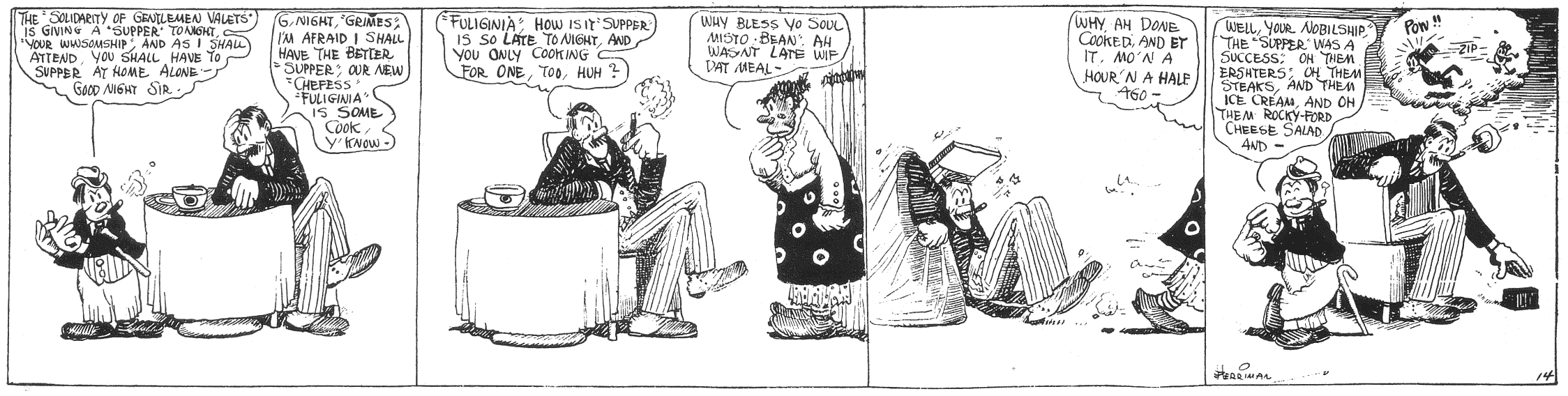
Baron Bean comic strip by George Herriman (Friday, April 14, 1916)

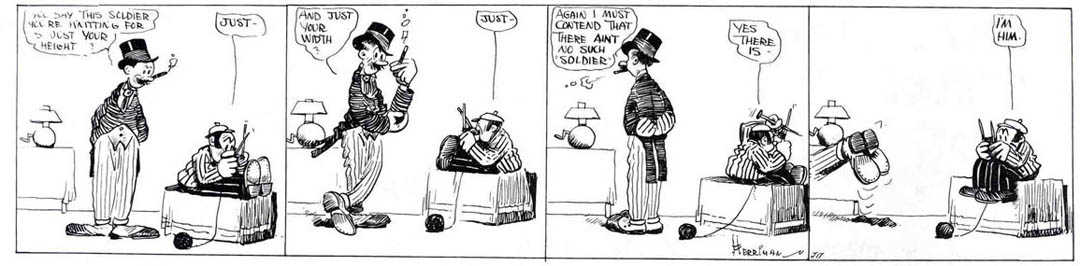
Baron Bean comic strip by George Herriman (1917)

Baron Bean is a newspaper comic strip created by the cartoonist George Herriman. Baron Bean was distributed by King Features Syndicate.

Baron Bean replaced Herriman's previous domestic comedy strip, The Dingbat Family, which ran from 1910 to January 4, 1916. On January 5, 1916, Herriman began the daily Baron Bean, and continued until January 22, 1919. Herriman continued to draw other strips in addition to Krazy Kat through 1932.

M. Thomas Inge took note of Herriman's interest in silent comedies and observed, "In his appearance, the Baron borrowed his cane and his facial features from Chaplin." Comics historian Ron Goulart stated that while Baron Bean superficially resembled Mutt and Jeff, "Herriman usually shunned conventional jokes and it exhibited some of the graphic eccentricities to be found in more abundance in Krazy Kat." Herriman had previously drawn a similar character, Baron Mooch, in 1909–10.

In 1977, the strips were collected in Baron Bean: 1916–1917 (Hyperion Press).

In 2012, IDW's "The Library of American Comics" announced a three-volume reprint of Baron Bean as part of their new LoAC Essentials series. The first volume came out in September 2012 (covering the year 1916), the second came out in December 2014 (covering the year 1917), and the final volume came out in December 2018 (covering the year 1918 and the few 1919 strips). They span volumes 1, 6, and 12 of the LOAC Essentials series, respectively.
