= Bean Lake (Cottonwood County, Minnesota) =

Lake in the state of Minnesota, United States

- Location within Minnesota
- Location: Cottonwood County, Minnesota
- Coordinates: 44°4′17″N 95°22′25″W
- Type: Lake
- Surface area: 0.57 km^{2} (0.22 sq mi)
- Max. depth: 3.66 m (12.0 ft)
- Surface elevation: 418 m (1,371 ft)

Bean Lake is a lake in Cottonwood County, in the U.S. state of Minnesota. The lake is several miles northwest of the town of Storden, Minnesota.

Bean Lake was named for Joseph F. Bean, an early settler.
