= Denney (surname) =

Denney is a surname, and may refer to:

- Alex Denney (1926–2004), Australian rules footballer
- Alice Denney (1922–2023), American art curator and arts administrator
- Austin Denney (1944–2009), American football player
- Caydee Denney (born 1993), American pair skater
- Charles Eugene Denney (1879–1965), American railroad executive
- Colleen Denney, American art historian and educator
- Dan Denney, American aircraft designer
- Edwin R. Denney (1904–1986), American politician
- Haven Denney (born 1995), American pair skater
- James Denney (1856–1917), Scottish theologian and preacher
- Jim Denney (ski jumper born 1957), American former ski jumper
- Jim Denney (ski jumper born 1983), American ski jumper
- John Denney (born 1978), American football player
- Kevin Denney (born 1978), American singer-songwriter
- Kyle Denney (born 1977), American baseball player
- Lawerence Denney (born 1948), American politician
- Lee Denney (born 1953), American politician
- Mark Denney (born 1975), English rugby union footballer
- Mike Denney, American television soap opera director
- Nora "Dodo" Denney (1927–2004), American actress
- Reuel Denney (1913–1995), American poet and academic
- Robert V. Denney (1916–1981), American politician and judge
- Ryan Denney (born 1977), American football player
- Thomas F. Denney (1874–1913), American politician
- Tom Denney (born 1982), American musician and record producer
- Travis Denney (born 1976), Australian badminton player
- William D. Denney (1873–1953), American businessman and politician, Governor of Delaware

== See also ==
- Denny (surname)
- Denney Wilie, American baseball player
