= Beane (surname) =

Beane is a surname. Notable people with the surname include:

- Anthony Beane (born 1994), American basketball player
- Billy Beane (born 1962), American baseball player and executive
- Brandon Beane (born 1976), general manager of the NFL's Buffalo Bills since 2017
- Carl Beane (1952–2012), American radio sports announcer
- Douglas Carter Beane, American playwright and screenwriter
- James Dudley Beane (1896–1916), American World War I flying ace
- John Beane (c. 1503–1580), English politician
- Vanilla Beane (1919–2022), American milliner
- Violett Beane (born 1996), American actress

== See also ==
- Bean (name)
