= Beaner =

Ethnic slur against Mexican people

Beaner is a slang term and derogatory slur originally from the United States for individuals from Mexico or of Mexican American heritage. It originates from the bean being a staple ingredient in Mexican cuisine.

The equivalent Spanish word is frijolero.

== Usage ==
The word was first seen in print in 1965, although the term has reportedly been in use at least since the 1940s, having evolved from previous slurs such as bean-eater (1919) and bean-bandit (1959). It is one of many national and ethnic slurs that refer to a nation's cuisine, such kraut for a German, spud-muncher for an Irish person, and frog for a French person.

The word is considered to be one of the most offensive slurs for Mexican-Americans, although according to The Historical Dictionary of American Slang, the word is only "usually considered offensive". Academics say that it is the most prominent anti-Mexican slur, having replaced greaser after the 1950s. It can resonate with the xenophobic sentiment that "you’re not American, and you never will be", and as such is sometimes directed at any Hispanic.

In the 2000s comedian Carlos Mencia was known for using it, and other pejoratives, extensively and used it regularly for comedic effect in his Mind of Mencia program.

In May 2018, about two weeks before Starbucks initiated a racial bias training program for its American employees, a Hispanic customer in La Cañada, California, received his order with the name Beaner written on it.

== Other use ==
Because the term originates from a common English word, there are other pre-existing or unknowing uses of beaner. For example, beaner has been used to describe someone from Boston (Beantown, Boston baked beans, Boston Beaneaters); when accidentally smoking a marijuana seed (alternatively called a bean); a nickname (the 2012 book In Beaner's Backyard); in coffee shops (for the coffee bean); and for a hit by pitch in baseball (beanball). Awareness about the offensive meaning of the word is resulting in its usage being criticized and phased out of mainstream use:

- On September 15, 2007, regional coffee chain Biggby Coffee, having been called "Beaner's Coffee" since its founding in 1995, decided to change its name to Biggby Coffee in response to comments about the unintended slur in its name. Biggby CEO and founder Bob Fish said, "We ultimately felt we would be condoning the use of a disparaging term if we chose to do nothing".
- In 2019, the use of the word beaner in the New York Times crossword, clued as "Pitch to the head, informally", generated controversy. New York Times crossword editor Will Shortz claimed he knew that the term had a pejorative meaning, but he had never personally heard it used as a slur before and argued that "any benign meaning of a word" ought to be "fair game" for inclusion in the crossword. Shortz ultimately apologized for including the slur.
- In 2019, Duluth, Minnesota coffee shop Beaner's Central changed its name to Wussow's Concert Cafe. Owner Jason Wussow stated that "Although the name Beaners was chosen twenty years ago out of innocent unawareness, it is undeniable that this word is xenophobic and offensive to many".

== Use in film ==
The word has been used by Tommy Chong in Cheech and Chong's Next Movie, by Clint Eastwood in Gran Torino and The Mule, by Hank Schrader in Breaking Bad, by Al Pacino in Donnie Brasco and by Jeff Bridges in The Morning After, and in the movies 30 Minutes or Less by Fred Ward and Lone Star State of Mind by David Semel.

== See also ==
- Greaser
- Spic
- Wetback
