= Beanie =

Beanie may refer to:

== Headgear ==
- Beanie (seamed cap), in parts of North America, a cap made from cloth often joined by a button at the crown and seamed together around the sides
- Beanie, a knit cap, in Britain, Australia, South Africa and parts of Canada and the United States (also known as a toque)
- Beanie, any type of headgear unsuitable for safe motorcycling

== People ==
- Richard Dalley, American ice dancer
- Beanie Ebert (1902–1980), American football player
- Beanie Feldstein (b. 1993), American actress and singer
- Beanie Sigel (b. 1974), American rapper born Dwight Grant
- H. M. Walker (1878–1937), American writer for silent and early talking films and newspaper sports writer
- Beanie Wells (b. 1988), American football running back
- Les Witte (1911–1973), American basketball
- Wilbur Soot (b. 1996), English Twitch streamer and YouTuber

== Arts, entertainment, and media ==
- The Beanies, an Australian children's band and podcast
- Beanie Babies, a popular stuffed toy animal line, launched in 1993
- Bernard "Beanie" Campbell, a character in the 2003 film Old School
- Ben "Beanie" Harper, a character on the soap opera Love of Life
- Beany, title character of the children's programs Time for Beany, Beany and Cecil, and The New Adventures of Beany and Cecil
- Rebecca "Beanie" Martineau, a character in the Murder Most Unladylike novel series
- "Beanni", a song by the Cat Empire from their self-titled debut album, 2003

== See also ==
- Beeny, a hamlet in England
- Beaney, a surname
