= 1970 in the environment =

This is a list of notable events relating to the environment in 1970. They relate to environmental law, conservation, environmentalism and environmental issues.

== Events ==
- The California Environmental Quality Act is passed into law and signed by then California Governor Ronald Reagan.
- Francis A. Schaeffer publishes Pollution and the Death of Man.
- Natural Resources Defense Council is founded.
- League of Conservation Voters is founded.
- A decade of "chronic sand mining" at Vigie Beach, Saint Lucia ends, but not before it worsened the effects of hurricanes and made "coastal resources management development" more difficult.

=== January ===
- The United States National Environmental Policy Act becomes effective.

=== February ===
- US President Richard Nixon gave the nation's first presidential message on the environment.

=== April ===
- The first Earth Day took place on April 22, organized by Gaylord Nelson, former senator of Wisconsin, and Denis Hayes, Harvard graduate student. Twenty million people participated in teach-ins in the United States.
- US President Richard Nixon signed the Environmental Quality Improvement Act.
- Joni Mitchell releases Big Yellow Taxi, a song inspired by her seeing parking lots in Hawaii: "They paved paradise to put up a parking lot".

=== August ===
- On August 24, the 1970 Clean Air Car Race started at the Massachusetts Institute of Technology in Cambridge, Massachusetts and ended six days later at the California Institute of Technology in Pasadena, California. The race was intended to demonstrate the feasibility of lower-emission cars before the Clean Air Act emissions standards came into effect in 1975.

=== October ===
- On October 16, Joni Mitchell, James Taylor, and Phil Ochs perform at a benefit concert for the Don't Make a Wave Committee, the organization that would become Greenpeace, at the Amchitka concert.

=== December ===
- The United States Environmental Protection Agency is formed.
- President Richard Nixon signed the Clean Air Act of 1970.
- Norman Borlaug, the father of the Green Revolution, wins the Nobel Peace Prize.

== See also ==
- Human impact on the environment
- List of environmental issues
- List of years in the environment
