= How Should We Then Live? =

Christian apologetic documentary

- First edition
- Author: Francis A. Schaeffer
- Language: English
- Genre: Religion
- Publisher: Fleming H. Revell Company
- Publication date: 1976

How Should We Then Live: The Rise and Decline of Western Thought and Culture is a Christian cultural and historical documentary film series and book. The book was written by presuppositionalist theologian Francis A. Schaeffer and first published in 1976. The book served as the basis for a series of ten films. Schaeffer narrated and appeared throughout the film series, which was produced by his son Frank Schaeffer and directed by John Gonser. In the film series, Schaeffer criticized the influences of the Renaissance, the Enlightenment, and Charles Darwin as leading to moral relativism, nihilism, and the erosion of absolute values. The films were credited with inspiring a number of leaders of the American conservative evangelical movement, including Jerry Falwell. The complete list of materials that the Schaeffers produced under the title "How Should We Then Live?" include the initial book, a study guide for the book, the ten-episode film series, and study aids for the films.

== Overview ==
According to Schaeffer, How Should We Then Live traces Western history from Ancient Rome until the time of writing (1976) along three lines: the philosophic, scientific, and religious. He also makes extensive references to art and architecture as a means of showing how these movements reflected changing patterns of thought through time. Schaeffer's central premise is: when we base society on the Bible, on the infinite-personal God who is there and has spoken, this provides an absolute by which we can conduct our lives and by which we can judge society. This leads to what Schaeffer calls "Freedom without chaos."

When people base society on humanism, which he defines as "a value system rooted in the belief that man is his own measure, that man is autonomous, totally independent", all values are relative and we have no way to distinguish right from wrong except for "synthesis, pragmatism, and utilitarianism." He generally considered humanism to be a misrepresentation of Western civilization.

Because people generally disagree on what is best for which group, this leads to fragmentation of thought, which has led to the despair and alienation so prevalent in society today. This fragmentation is expressed in the visual arts in works such as Les Demoiselles d'Avignon by Pablo Picasso. This work is considered to mark the beginning of Modern Art. Another premise is that modern relative values are based on Personal Peace (the desire to be personally unaffected by the world's problems) and Affluence (an increasing personal income.) He warns that when we live by these values we will be tempted to sacrifice our freedoms in exchange for an authoritarian government who will provide the relative values. He further warns that this government will not be obvious like the fascist regimes of the 20th century but will be based on manipulation and subtle forms of information control, psychology, and genetics.

== Table of Contents ==
- List of Illustrations
- Acknowledgments
- Chapter 1: Ancient Rome - The finite Graeco-Roman gods were not a sufficient inward base for the Roman society: Rome crumbled from within, and the invasions of the barbarians only completed the breakdown.
- Chapter 2: The Middle Ages - Had many positive elements of a Christian society, but allowed humanistic concepts to begin to blend with the earlier Bible based Christianity. These elements would begin to polarize in the Renaissance.
- Chapter 3: The Renaissance - The rebirth of classical thought. The humanistic ideal, man beginning only from himself, becomes dominant and will continue to grow to its logical conclusion through the further periods.
- Chapter 4: The Reformation - The philosophic reasons the reformers wanted to break away from the Church of Rome. The reformers attitudes toward art and culture.
- Chapter 5: The Reformation – Continued - The effects the Reformation had on society, affecting thinkers who even themselves may not have been Christian by the traditional definition.
- Chapter 6: The Enlightenment - How optimism at human potential became divorced from religion. How the French Revolution showed the logical conclusion of this.
- Chapter 7: The Rise of Modern Science - Science's foundation came from confidence that God had created an orderly world that we could understand.
- Chapter 8: The Breakdown in Philosophy and Science - The shift from the concept of the uniformity in an open system to the concept of natural causes in a closed system begins the descent to despair and the conclusion that man is merely a machine.
- Chapter 9: Modern Philosophy and Modern Theology - Further steps down the line of despair. How the theologians follow the philosophers.
- Chapter 10: Modern Art, Music, Literature, and Films - Numerous examples of despair and alienation in modern productions.
- Chapter 11: Our Society - How the values of personal peace and affluence permeate our society.
- Chapter 12: Manipulation and the New Elite - How our society has opened itself up to the coming of an elite authoritarian state.
- Chapter 13: The Alternatives - Return to the Christian foundation of our society or face increasing economic breakdown, war, the chaos of violence, radical redistribution of wealth, and growing shortage of food and natural resources.
- A Special Note - Christians have special responsibilities
- Chronological Index - A detailed time line, intended to be used like an index, with page number references tied to the text.
- Topical Index - A more traditional index
- Select Bibliography

== Inspiration for the film series ==
The film series "was intended as a Christian version of Sir Kenneth Clark's popular Civilisation series on public television." Schaeffer often decried the Civilisation series and other programs appearing on Public Television in America as part of a relativist conspiracy, declaring, "Public television gives us many things that many of us like culturally, but is also completely committed to a propaganda position that the last reality is only material/energy shaped by pure chance. Clark's Civilisation, Bronowski's The Ascent of Man, Carl Sagan's Cosmos – they all say it. There is only one final view of reality that's possible and that is that the final reality is material or energy shaped by pure chance. It is about us on every side, and especially the government and the courts have become the vehicle to force this anti-God view on the total population." A number of consultants and researchers were approached to provide input in specialist areas, including Hans Rookmaaker for the history of art, and opera singer Jane Stuart Smith for music. A guide to accompany the film series was also produced to facilitate group study.

== The film series ==
The film series How Should We Then Live? was a 1977 Gospel Films Production, written and narrated by Francis A. Schaeffer, executive producer Billy Zeoli, created and produced by Franky Schaeffer V, directed by John Gonser (some scenes by Franky Schaeffer V), post production directed by Mel White. Each episode is under half an hour.

- Episode I - The Roman Age
- Episode II - The Middle Ages
- Episode III - The Renaissance
- Episode IV - The Reformation
- Episode V - The Revolutionary Age
- Episode VI - The Scientific Age
- Episode VII - The Age of Non Reason
- Episode VIII - The Age of Fragmentation
- Episode IX - The Age of Personal Peace & Affluence
- Episode X - Final Choices

== Reception ==
=== Speaking Tour ===
Colin Duriez, in his biography of Schaeffer, describes the initial speaking tour and its reception: "Schaeffer spoke at seminars across North America where the film series was shown. In an initial speaking tour of eighteen cities in 1977, there was an enthusiastic response to the screening of the ten half-hour episodes... The film series was also shown around Europe, including local screenings set up by churches and Christian groups in the United Kingdom... The prospect of a large screen presentation perhaps removed peoples fears of being lost, as when hearing or reading Schaeffer undiluted. The seminar pattern, with a lecture by Francis and a showing of an episode followed by his taking questions from the audience, anticipated the more controversial series Whatever Happened to the Human Race? which, however, had smaller audiences."

=== Influence among Evangelicals ===
Duriez reports that the film series "became a sensation among evangelicals, drawing audiences of up to five thousand in the churches that screened it. The accompanying book was a best-seller in the evangelical market...", selling forty thousand copies in the first three months. "...[In America] Conservative evangelicals had been looking for an explanation for the secular drift of their country, and Schaeffer's diagnosis of contemporary cultural ills gave them a framework for understanding it." With this and his other works "Schaeffer gave an entire generation of ministers the permission to read philosophy and to be engaged with the culture. It was not unusual for a ministerial student to be accused of 'carnal-mindedness' for reading philosophers or, even worse novelists, in an attempt to broaden the range of Christian apologetics. Schaeffer...can be credited for overcoming the monopoly of biblical studies and theology in the education of Evangelical ministers."

Frank Schaeffer the creator/producer of the film series states "How Should We Then Live? and the second series..."Whatever Happened to the Human Race? are still standard works today in thousands of evangelical high schools, colleges, and seminaries around the world. For many evangelicals, Francis Schaeffer is their first, and perhaps only, introduction to what 'we' think about art, history and culture, and politics - not to mention 'life issues.'"

In America the film series/book's call to action against legalized abortion is seen as a key impetus to the development of a political Christian Right movement, "Conservative evangelicals' newfound devotion to the GOP stemmed partly from their increased attention to abortion. In 1980, evangelicals had opposed abortion, but they generally viewed it as only one of many national sins, including the sexual revolution, homosexuality, feminism, and pornography. In the mid-1980s, evangelicals moved closer to the conservative Catholic position on the issue and began to view abortion as a unique evil, far worse than other national sins. Evangelicals heightened concern about abortion was largely due to the influence of Francis Schaeffer and his son Franky." It is generally admitted by Evangelical leaders, such as Ralph Reed, that "abortion only became a central issue for Evangelicals as a result of a book and ten-part film series in 1976, How Should We Then Live?"

=== Catholic response ===
While praising Schaeffer's message against legalized abortion, Schaeffer's comments in the film series/book about the Catholic Church drew a critical response. In the series, particularly when speaking about the Reformation, Schaeffer repeats much of the criticism of the Catholic Church made by previous Protestant leaders and restates such criticism as accepted fact. Catholics have always taken issue with such claims, seeing them as outright falsehoods or at the very least misrepresenting their faith.

==== Aquinas controversy ====
Roman Catholic scholar Taylor Marshall has disputed Schaeffer's assessment of Thomas Aquinas, specifically with regard to the effect of the Fall on the intellect, which was subsequently repeated by other theologians following after Schaeffer (such as Tim Lahaye in The Battle for the Mind). In both the book and film series Schaeffer states: "Then came Thomas Aquinas, a Dominican monk. He was the outstanding theologian of that period and his thinking still has much influence. He had an incomplete view of the fall of man, as man had revolted against God. In his view the human will was fallen or corrupted, but the intellect was not. As a result of this emphasis, gradually philosophy began to act in an increasingly independent autonomous manner." Schaeffer, who never actually quotes Aquinas in the series, goes on to mark him as a key source for the development of humanism and relativism.

In his response Marshall points to Aquinas' work (Summa Theologica Ia, q. 85 a. 3) where he expounds on the work of the Venerable Bede, who lists the effects of the fall of man as four wounds which includes the fall of the human intellect. Aquinas writes "Therefore in so far as the reason is deprived of its order to the true, there is the wound of ignorance; in so far as the will is deprived of its order of good, there is the wound of malice; in so far as the irascible is deprived of its order to the arduous, there is the wound of weakness; and in so far as the concupiscible is deprived of its order to the delectable, moderated by reason, there is the wound of concupiscence."

In absolute contrast to Schaeffer, Catholics see Aquinas as an enemy of relativism citing his work on theology (including ST I Q1 A6 ad 2) where he says "The principles of other sciences either are evident and cannot be proved, or are proved by natural reason through some other science. But the knowledge proper to this science [theology] comes through revelation and not through natural reason. Therefore it has no concern to prove the principles of other sciences, but only to judge of them. Whatsoever is found in other sciences contrary to any truth of this science must be condemned as false: 'Destroying counsels and every height that exalteth itself against the knowledge of God' (2 Corinthians 10:4-5)." Rather than Aquinas, Catholics see Immanuel Kant as the key figure in Modern Relativism.

Unease over Schaeffer's portrayal of Aquinas is not limited to Catholics. J.P. Moreland, a professor of the Talbot School of Theology, writing the forward to the 2006 reprint of Schaeffer's book Escape from Reason, states "Others argue, sometime correctly, that Schaeffer paints with too broad a brush and, as a result, somewhat misrepresents certain thinkers. I, for one, do not think his treatment of Thomas Aquinas is entirely fair or accurate. However at the end of the day these criticisms miss the genius of this book."

As an indication of the controversy of his position on Aquinas, soon after Schaeffer's death the premier Evangelical magazine Christianity Today, included a cartoon of him. In it Schaeffer enters the gates of heaven with his trademark goatee while wearing lederhosen. Saint Peter finds his name in the Book of Life and says "Francis Schaeffer...Oh, yes. Saint Thomas Aquinas would like to have a word with you."
