= Back to Freedom and Dignity =

1972 book by Francis A. Schaeffer

- Author: Francis A. Schaeffer
- Language: English
- Genre: Religion
- Publication date: 1972
- Publication place: United States

Back to Freedom and Dignity is a philosophic work by American theologian and apologist Francis A. Schaeffer, Downers Grove:InterVarsity Press, first published in 1972. It is Book Four in Volume One of The Complete Works of Francis A. Schaeffer A Christian Worldview. Westchester, IL:Crossway Books, 1982.

== Overview ==
This short work by Schaeffer is an answer to the work of B.F. Skinner and others, arguing that the freedom and dignity of man are God-given and therefore can't be left aside without dire consequences.

== Contents ==
- Jacques Monod: Chance and Necessity
- Francis Crick: Why I Study Biology
- The Abuse of Genetic Knowledge
- Probing the Brain
- Ice-Cube Babies
- Kenneth Clark: A Pill for Peace
- Skinner: Beyond Freedom and Dignity
- Christianity and Conditioning
- How Like a Dog!
- Conclusion
