= True Spirituality =

True Spirituality is a work on personal spirituality written by American theologian and Christian apologist Francis A. Schaeffer, Wheaton, IL: Tyndale, first published in 1971. It is Book Two in Volume Three of The Complete Works of Francis A. Schaeffer A Christian Worldview. Westchester, IL:Crossway Books, 1982.

== Overview ==
This is the spiritual foundation for Schaeffer's work, as a complement to the theological and philosophical approach of most of his other books. It is useful for gaining a balanced view of the whole of Schaeffer's life and ministry. The roots of this book and Mark of the Christian are in a serious spiritual crisis that Schaeffer went through in the early 1950s that involved Rev. Carl McIntyre and "The Separatist Movement". Pastor and friend L.G. Parkhurst explains this crisis in Chapter Six of his book Francis and Edith Schaeffer (Bethany House, 1996), entitled "Troubles Bring New Opportunities".
