= Gospel Communications International =

Christian media company

- Formerly: Gospel Films
- Type: Private
- Founded: 1950
- Fate: Financial Issues
- Headquarters: Muskegon, Michigan, United States
- Area served: Worldwide
- Key people: Ken Anderson, Billy Zeoli
- Subsidiaries: Bible Gateway (1995-2008)

Gospel Communications International (formerly Gospel Films) was a non-profit Christian organization and the founder and parent organization of several Christian websites based in Muskegon, Michigan.

Gospel Films, the original name of the company, was a nonprofit Christian film production and distribution organization founded in 1949 in Muskegon, Michigan. The organization produced and distributed religious films for churches, schools, and parachurch organizations in the United States and internationally. Over time, Gospel Films expanded into youth-oriented programming and documentary production and later transitioned into digital media under the name Gospel Communications International.

== History ==
=== Founding and early years ===
Gospel Films was founded in 1949 by filmmaker Ken Anderson after he returned from ministry work in China. While in China, Anderson wrote scripts and worked on film production and produced the short documentary This Way to the Harvest. After returning to the United States, he relocated to the Youth Haven Boys’ Home in Muskegon, Michigan, where he wrote a book inspired by the lives of its residents. The book served as the basis for his first feature film, That Kid Buck (1949).

After the film was distributed, Anderson proposed forming a nonprofit Christian film company. Gospel Films was established in 1949 and opened its first studio in 1952. The organization was governed by a small board of evangelical leaders and businesspeople, many of whom had connections to Youth for Christ.

During the organization’s early years, Anderson wrote, directed, and produced several of its low-budget evangelistic and missionary films. Gospel Films distributed its productions through a rental system known as Gospel Film Libraries, which allowed churches and youth groups to rent films rather than purchase them. The organization developed a national distribution network and became known within evangelical circles during the 1950s.

=== Youth Films division and leadership transition ===
In the mid-1950s, Gospel Films began producing more films for teenage and college audiences. Billy Zeoli, then director of Indianapolis Youth for Christ, was hired to lead a newly created Youth Films division. Zeoli promoted scripted films for high school and college audiences and sought wider distribution beyond churches.

Anderson and Zeoli disagreed over the kinds of films Gospel Films should produce. Anderson favored explicitly evangelistic and missionary films, while Zeoli supported narrative and testimony-based productions for broader youth audiences. In 1959, the board elected Zeoli president by secret ballot.

=== Leadership under Billy Zeoli ===
In 1963, Gospel Films produced The Tony Fontane Story, a film depicting the religious conversion of recording artist Tony Fontane following a serious automobile accident. The production employed professional film crews and was promoted through a series of concerts and speaking events featuring Fontane and his wife, Kerry Vaughn.

In 1965, Richard DeVos, cofounder of Amway, became chairman of the board, with Zeoli continuing as president. The organization emphasized film distribution and partnerships with independent filmmakers, releasing titles such as The Gospel Blimp (1967) and Peace Child (1972).

Gospel Films also served as executive producer for the documentary series How Should We Then Live? The Rise and Decline of Western Thought and Culture (1977), hosted by philosopher and theologian Francis Schaeffer. The film series was distributed alongside a companion book and speaking tour in the United States. A follow-up series, Whatever Happened to the Human Race?, was later produced with involvement from Frank Schaeffer and funding from evangelical donors.

=== Transition to digital media ===
During the 1980s and 1990s, Gospel Films shifted from film distribution to video and DVD formats. In 1995, the organization launched GospelCom, an online portal designed to provide hosting and technical support for evangelical ministries. In 1998, Gospel Films formally became Gospel Communications International, Inc. In the early 2000s, Doug DeVos took on more responsibilities with the company.

Gospel Communications International developed BibleGateway.com, an online Bible platform, and provided web services and training to numerous religious organizations during the early years of widespread internet adoption.

=== Later developments ===
Gospel Communications Network was established in 1995 with nine partner ministries. Its projects included BibleGateway, which was acquired by Zondervan in 2007.

By the mid-2000s, Zeoli had reduced his involvement in daily operations. The organization faced financial challenges in subsequent years, and the global financial crisis of 2008 contributed to its closure. Gospel Communications International ceased operations shortly thereafter.
