= Pollution and the Death of Man =

1970 book by Francis Schaeffer

- Author: Francis A. Schaeffer
- Language: English
- Publication date: 1970

Pollution and the Death of Man is an ecological and philosophical work by the American presuppositionalist theologian Francis A. Schaeffer, published in 1970.

== See also ==
- 1970 in the environment
