= Ken Anderson (filmmaker) =

American film director (1917–2006)

- Born: December 23, 1917; Rembrandt, Iowa, U.S.
- Died: March 12, 2006 (aged 88); Warsaw, Indiana, U.S.
- Occupations: Screenwriter, director, producer, author
- Years active: 1961-1986
- Known for: Christian-themed films
- Notable work: Pilgrim's Progress
- Spouse: Doris Jones (1938-2006; his death)
- Children: 7

Ken Anderson (December 23, 1917 – March 12, 2006) was an American Evangelical Free Church minister, screenwriter, director and producer of Christian films. He founded Gospel Films and directed Pilgrim's Progress, a 1978 adaptation of The Pilgrim's Progress by John Bunyan, which marked the first screen appearance for actor Liam Neeson. Anderson wrote 77 fiction and non-fiction books over six decades, including the best-seller Where to Find It in the Bible. He was the first editor for Youth for Christ magazine, which came to be known as Ignite Your Faith.

== Early life and education ==
Anderson was born in Rembrandt, Iowa. His mother died during childbirth, and Anderson was raised by his father and paternal grandmother. He studied at Wheaton College and Trinity International University in Illinois, later joining the Evangelical Free Church as a pastor. He preached in churches in Isle, Minnesota, and later in Newman Grove, Nebraska. In 1944, he became the first full-time editor for Ignite Your Faith magazine, then known as Youth For Christ, through which he met Robert Pierce. In 1948, under Pierce's guidance, he traveled through China as a missionary, and was influenced by the 1948 documentary China Challenge made by Pierce and producer/director Dick Ross.

== Career ==
Through overseas ministry work in China in the late 1940s, Anderson gained experience in scriptwriting and film production and produced the short documentary This Way to the Harvest. After relocating to the Youth Haven Boys’ Home in Muskegon, Michigan, he wrote a book inspired by the lives of residents there, which became the basis for his first feature film, That Kid Buck in 1949. After the film's success, Anderson proposed forming a nonprofit Christian film company. Gospel Films was founded in 1949.

Gospel Films was initially governed by a small board of evangelical leaders and businesspeople, many of whom had ties to Youth for Christ. During the organization's early years, Anderson wrote, directed, and produced several low-budget films. The company developed a nationwide rental-based distribution network through Gospel Film Libraries, which allowed churches and youth groups to rent films rather than purchase them.

In the mid-1950s, Gospel Films began producing more films aimed at young people with the appointment of Billy Zeoli to lead its Youth Films division. Zeoli sought wider distribution for the company's films and supported the production of films aimed at teenagers and college students. Anderson and Zeoli later disagreed over the company's direction. Anderson favored evangelistic and missionary films, while Zeoli supported films intended for a broader audience.

In 1959, Anderson was a candidate for president of Gospel Films. Following a board election conducted by secret ballot, Zeoli was selected instead. Anderson accepted the decision and left Gospel Films in December 1960. He (and his wife Doris) subsequently founded Ken Anderson Films in 1961.

Ken Anderson Films was a not-for-profit company that eventually released over 200 titles. Anderson produced Pilgrim's Progress and its sequel, Christiana. He also produced biographical films about Hudson Taylor and Fanny Crosby.

== Personal life and death ==
In 1938 Anderson married Doris Ilene Jones (1918–2013), and together they had seven children. He died in 2006 of natural causes in Winona Lake outside of Warsaw, Indiana.

== Legacy ==
Anderson's papers and films are preserved at the Billy Graham Center Archives at Wheaton College.

According to Terry Lindvall and Andrew Quicke, Anderson was a pioneer in Christian filmmaking who influenced the creation of other nonprofit Christian film companies.

== Filmography ==
=== Director ===
- 1961: The Family That Changed the World
- 1964: In His Steps
- 1965: Man of Steel
- 1969: Journey to the Sky
- 1972: The Gospel According to Most People
- 1978: Pilgrim's Progress
- 1979: Christiana
- 1981: Hudson Taylor
- 1982: The Answer
- 1984: Fanny Crosby
- 1984: Mud, Sweat and Cheers
- 1986: Mark of the Red Hand
- 1986: Second Step

=== Producer ===
- 1972: The Gospel According to Most People
- 1973: My Son, My Son
- 1981: Hudson Taylor
- 1984: Fanny Crosby

=== Writer ===
- 1964: In His Steps
- 1974: Apache Fire
- 1978: Pilgrim's Progress
- 1979: Christiana
- 1981: Hudson Taylor
