= The God Who Is There =

- Author: Francis Schaeffer
- Subject: Religion, God
- Publisher: InterVarsity Press
- Publication date: 1968
- Publication place: United States
- Pages: 191
- OCLC: 337379

The God Who Is There is a Christian apologetic work written by American philosopher and Christian theologian Francis A. Schaeffer, published in 1968. It is Book One in Volume One of The Complete Works of Francis A. Schaeffer A Christian Worldview, and is the first book of Francis Schaeffer's "Trilogy." It was written before Escape from Reason but released after that second book was written and published. The third book in the Trilogy He Is There and He Is Not Silent was published in 1972.

== Table of Contents ==
- Section I: The Intellectual & Cultural Climate of the Second Half of the Twentieth Century
- Section II: The Relationship of the New Theology to the Intellectual Climate
- Section III: How Historic Christianity Differs from the New Theology
- Section IV: Speaking Historic Christianity into the Twentieth-Century Climate
- Section V: Pre-Evangelism is No Soft Option
- Section VI: Personal & Corporate Living into the Twentieth-Century Climate
