= Billy Zeoli =

American evangelical leader and media executive (1932–2015)

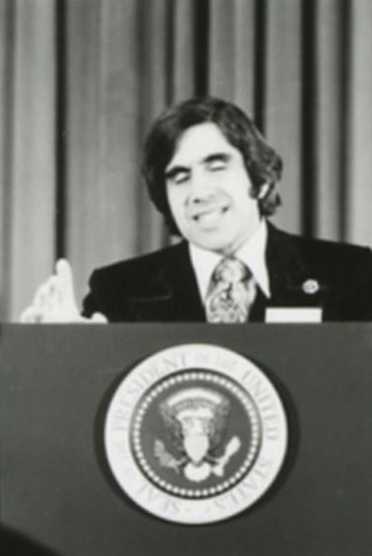
- Billy Zeoli speaking from the podium at the National Religious Broadcasters Annual Congressional Breakfast, January 28, 1975. Courtesy of the Gerald R. Ford Presidential Library.
- Born: William J. Zeoli; September 25, 1932
- Died: May 22, 2015 (aged 82)
- Citizenship: US
- Education: Wheaton College; Philadelphia School of the Bible; L'Abri (circa 1974)
- Occupations: film executive producer professional sports chaplin internet content producer writer
- Employer(s): Gospel Communications International; Gospel Films, Inc.; Indianapolis Youth for Christ; Billy Graham Indianapolis Crusade (1959).
- Known for: White House Chaplain to U.S. President Gerald R. Ford (1974–1977)
- Notable work: How Should We Then Live: The Rise and Decline of Western Thought and Culture (1977, film executive producer)
- Television: How Should We Then Live: The Rise and Decline of Western Thought and Culture (2005; television series)
- Title: God's Got a Better Idea (book author)
- Political party: Republican
- Spouse: Marilyn Bruder (1955-1981) Ruth Zeoli (1984-1998)
- Children: Steven Zeoli, Patresha Rohre, Dr. David Zeoli and Zachary Zeoli
- Parent(s): Anthony Zeoli and Elizabeth Zeoli

Billy Zeoli (September 25, 1932 – May 22, 2015) was an American evangelical minister, speaker, and media executive. He served as a spiritual adviser to President Gerald Ford, helped organize chapel services for professional athletes, and was president of Gospel Films, later Gospel Communications International, from 1962 to 2006.

== Early life and education ==
Zeoli grew up in Philadelphia, the son of evangelist Anthony Zeoli. He attended Germantown Academy, Philadelphia College of the Bible, and Wheaton College in Illinois. He was of Italian and German descent. Zeoli was ordained as a Presbyterian minister and evangelist in 1953.

== White House Chaplain ==
Gerald Ford was elected the Congressional representative of the 5th District of Michigan from 1949 to the time of his presidency. Zeoli had moved to Grand Rapids, Michigan in the late 1950s and first met Ford in 1960. The two men became friends and Zeoli started sending Ford a devotional once every month in the early 1970s. (These devotionals would later become a book called God's Got a Better Idea, a twist on the Ford political slogan, "Ford has a better idea"). Ford and Zeoli would meet in Washington and frequent events such as the Presidential Prayer Breakfast, and at sporting events where Zeoli was preaching. Zeoli later said that Ford made a Christian commitment after attending a chapel service at which Zeoli preached. Ford would later become vice-president of the United States when Spiro Agnew resigned on October 10, 1973. While Zeoli was vacationing in Oberammergau, Germany, Ford called Zeoli and informed him that Richard Nixon had resigned and that Ford was now the 38th President of the United States. For the remainder of Ford's presidency, Zeoli would visit the White House and counsel on spiritual matters with the President. Zeoli's book God's Got a Better Idea described the many issues that the two discussed including; clemency for draft evaders, the U. S. withdrawal from Vietnam, the Mayaguez incident, and the difficult question of issuing a pardon to former U.S. President Richard Nixon, who had resigned following the Watergate scandal and the administration's attempted cover-up of its involvement.

== Sports Ministry and Media ==
In the 1970s, Zeoli conducted chapel services for professional sports teams and worked with Baseball Chapel founder Watson Spoelstra and former New York Yankees player Bobby Richardson to expand such services in professional sports. Zeoli was the minister for several Super Bowls, World Series, and All-Star Games services and received recognition as a minister for several American major league professional sport teams and athletes.

== Gospel Films and Gospel Communications ==
Zeoli was working as the director for Indianapolis Youth For Christ in the 1950s when he was hired to join a fledgling Christian film company in Muskegon, Michigan called Gospel Films. Gospel Films appointed Zeoli to lead its Youth Films division, which produced films for high school and college audiences, including venues outside traditional church settings. He also launched Free Films, a bimonthly publication for Christian youth workers.

Zeoli and Gospel Films cofounder Ken Anderson disagreed over the organization’s approach to filmmaking. Anderson favored explicitly evangelistic films, while Zeoli supported dramatic films aimed at younger audiences. In a 1959 board election, Zeoli was elected president of Gospel Films. Anderson accepted the outcome and left the organization in 1960 to establish Ken Anderson Films.

Zeoli served as executive producer of The Tony Fontane Story (1963), which dramatized singer Tony Fontane's conversion after a serious automobile accident. The production used a professional film crew and was promoted through concerts and speaking appearances by Fontane and his wife, Kerry Vaughn.

According to Terry Lindvall and Andrew Quicke, Gospel Films had become the world’s largest Christian film production and distribution organization by the mid-1960s. In 1965, Amway cofounder Richard DeVos became chairman of the board, with Zeoli continuing as president. The company expanded its distribution activities and released independently produced films, producing titles such as The Gospel Blimp (1967), Peace Child (1972), and various end-times films.

Gospel Films and Zeoli were executive producers of How Should We Then Live? The Rise and Decline of Western Thought and Culture, a 1977 documentary film series hosted by theologian Francis Schaeffer. The series was accompanied by a book and a U.S. speaking tour. According to Frank Schaeffer, the project helped increase evangelical Protestant involvement in opposition to abortion following the Supreme Court's 1973 Roe v. Wade decision. Frank Schaeffer later produced the related film series Whatever Happened to the Human Race?, with financial support that included Richard DeVos.

Gospel Films later expanded into digital media. In 1995, Zeoli launched GospelCom, which hosted websites and online services for Christian ministries. Gospel Films was renamed Gospel Communications International in 1998. The organization developed BibleGateway.com and provided web hosting and training for evangelical ministries. Zeoli withdrew from day-to-day management by the mid-2000s, and Gospel Communications later ceased operations because of financial difficulties.

== Personal life and death ==
Zeoli was married twice, and had four children. He died on May 22, 2015, at the age of 82.

== Selected publications ==
- Zeoli, Billy (1972). Supergoal. Revell.
- Zeoli, Billy (December 1975). "President Ford's Personal Prayers". Ladies' Home Journal. Vol. 92. p. 67.
- Zeoli, Billy (1978). God's Got a Better Idea. Revell.
