= Death in the City =

1969 book by Francis A. Schaeffer

- Author: Francis A. Schaeffer
- Language: English
- Genre: Religion
- Publisher: InterVarsity Press
- Publication date: 1969
- Publication place: United States

Death in the City is an apologetic work by American theologian Francis A. Schaeffer, Chicago: InterVarsity Press, first published in 1969. It is Book Four in Volume Four of The Complete Works of Francis A. Schaeffer: A Christian Worldview. Westchester, IL: Crossway Books, 1982.

== Overview ==
This work was written by Schaeffer as an answer to the question:

In what has been called a post-Christian world, what should be our perspective and how should we function as individuals, as institutions, as orthodox Christians, and as those who claim to be Bible-believing? (p. 209)

The basic answer, given by Schaeffer in Chapter One, is that "the church in our generation needs reformation, revival, and constructive revolution." (p. 209)

== Table of contents ==
- Chapter 1: Death in the City
- Chapter 2: The Loneliness of Man
- Chapter 3: The Message of Judgement
- Chapter 4: An Echo of the World
- Chapter 5: The Persistence of Compassion
- Chapter 6: The Significance of Man
- Chapter 7: The Man Without the Bible
- Chapter 8: The Justice of God
- Chapter 9: The Universe and Two Chairs
