= Escape from Reason =

1968 book by Francis Schaeffer

- Author: Francis A. Schaeffer
- Language: English
- Genre: Philosophy, theology
- Publisher: InterVarsity Press
- Publication date: 1968
- Publication place: United Kingdom

Escape From Reason is a philosophical work written by American theologian and Christian apologist Francis A. Schaeffer, London: InterVarsity Press, first published in 1968. It is Book Two in Volume One of The Complete Works of Francis A. Schaeffer A Christian Worldview. Westchester, IL:Crossway Books, 1982. This is the second book of Francis Schaeffer's "Trilogy." It was written and published after The God Who Is There was written but released before that first book.

== Overview ==
Unlike the first (The God Who Is There), and third (He Is There and He Is Not Silent) works in Schaeffer's "Trilogy", Escape from Reason is only loosely divided into seven chapters. Instead, each chapter contains a number of small sections, which offer a much clearer division of the prose. There are 39 such sections in all.
