= Francis Schaeffer =

American theologian (1912–1984)

The Reverend Francis Schaeffer
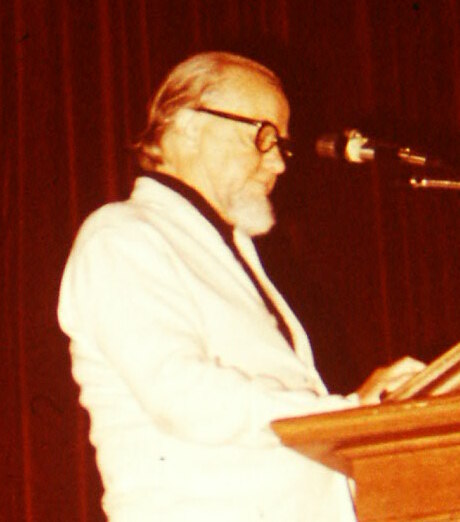
- Schaeffer in 1981
- Born: Francis August Schaeffer; January 30, 1912; Germantown, Pennsylvania, U.S.
- Died: May 15, 1984 (aged 72); Rochester, Minnesota, U.S.
- Education: Hampden–Sydney College; Westminster Theological Seminary; Faith Theological Seminary
- Occupations: Christian philosopher, Evangelical church leader, author
- Spouse: Edith Seville Schaeffer
- Children: 4, including Frank Schaeffer
- Ordination: BPC (1938–1956); EPC (1956–1965); RPCES (1965–1982); PCA (1982–1984)

Francis August Schaeffer (January 30, 1912 – May 15, 1984) was an American evangelical theologian, philosopher, and Presbyterian pastor. He co-founded the L'Abri community in Switzerland with his wife Edith Schaeffer, a prolific author in her own right. Opposed to theological modernism, Schaeffer promoted a more historic Protestant faith and a presuppositional approach to Christian apologetics, which he believed would answer the questions of the age.

Born in Germantown, Pennsylvania, he graduated with high honors from Hampden–Sydney College in 1935 and studied at Westminster and Faith Theological Seminaries. Schaeffer became the first graduate and ordained minister of the Bible Presbyterian Church and served pastorates in Pennsylvania and Missouri. In 1948, he moved with his family to Switzerland, where they founded the L’Abri community in 1955, which later expanded internationally.

Influenced by Cornelius Van Til, Herman Dooyeweerd, and Hans Rookmaaker, he argued that non-Christian worldviews are internally inconsistent and that Christianity offers a coherent foundation for truth, morality, and meaning. He called his method “Taking the roof off,” exposing contradictions in secular thinking to lead others toward Christianity. His published works include The God Who Is There, Escape from Reason, and He Is There and He Is Not Silent.

In the 1970s and 1980s, Schaeffer became a voice for evangelical political engagement, particularly around abortion and secular humanism. His 1981 book A Christian Manifesto encouraged Christians to challenge cultural pluralism while rejecting theocracy, influencing groups like Operation Rescue and shaping the Christian Right. He also co-founded the Seven Mountain Mandate, advocating Christian influence in society's key spheres, such as education, media, and government.

== Biography ==
Schaeffer was born on January 30, 1912, in Germantown, Pennsylvania, to Franz A. Schaeffer III and Bessie Williamson. He was of German and English ancestry.

In 1935, Schaeffer graduated magna cum laude from Hampden–Sydney College. The same year he married Edith Seville, the daughter of missionary parents who had been with the China Inland Mission founded by Hudson Taylor. Schaeffer then enrolled at Westminster Theological Seminary in the fall and studied under Cornelius Van Til (presuppositional apologetics) and J. Gresham Machen (doctrine of inerrancy).

In 1937, Schaeffer transferred to Faith Theological Seminary, graduating in 1938. This seminary was newly formed as a result of a split between the Presbyterian Church of America, now the Orthodox Presbyterian Church, and the Bible Presbyterian Church, a Presbyterian denomination more identified with Fundamentalist Christianity and premillennialism. Schaeffer was the first student to graduate and the first to be ordained in the Bible Presbyterian Church. He served pastorates in Pennsylvania (Grove City and Chester) and St. Louis, Missouri.

Schaeffer eventually sided with the Bible Presbyterian Church Columbus Synod following the BPC Collingswood and BPC Columbus split in 1956. BPC Columbus reorganized as the Evangelical Presbyterian Church in 1961, and Schaeffer followed the EPC into the Reformed Presbyterian Church, Evangelical Synod when the Bible Presbyterian Church's Columbus Synod merged with the Reformed Presbyterian Church, General Synod in 1965, a denomination which would merge with the Presbyterian Church in America, in 1982.

In 1948, the Schaeffer family moved to Switzerland and in 1955 established the community called L'Abri (French for 'the shelter'). Serving as both a philosophy seminar and a spiritual community, L'Abri attracted thousands of young people, and was later expanded into Sweden, France, the Netherlands, Canada, the United Kingdom and the United States.

Schaeffer received numerous honorary degrees. In 1954, he was awarded an honorary Doctor of Divinity degree from Highland College in Long Beach, California. In 1971, he received an honorary Doctor of Letters degree from Gordon College in Wenham, Massachusetts. In 1982, John Warwick Montgomery nominated Schaeffer for an honorary Doctor of Laws degree, which was conferred in 1983 by the Simon Greenleaf School of Law, Anaheim, California in recognition of his apologetic writings and ministry.

Schaeffer died of lymphoma on May 15, 1984, in Rochester, Minnesota. He opened a L'Abri branch there before his death. Schaeffer Academy, a private K-12 school in Rochester, is named after him.

== Family relationships ==
In Crazy for God, Schaeffer's son Frank presents a portrait of his father that is far more nuanced and multi-dimensional than was suggested by his public persona. He states, for example, that Schaeffer's primary passions in life were not the Bible and theology but rather art and culture. "And what moved him was not theology but beauty".

Schaeffer's son claims he had frequent bouts with depression and a verbally and physically abusive relationship with his wife, Edith. Those in the inner circle at L'Abri challenge Frank's account. Os Guinness, who lived with the Schaeffers and was a close friend of both the younger and elder Schaeffer, described Crazy for God as a "scurrilous caricature" and said, "[N]o one should take Frank's allegations at face value."

Frank Schaeffer initially supported his father's ideas and political program, but has since distanced himself from many of those views, first converting to the Eastern Orthodox Church and later becoming a liberal and a self-described "atheist who believes in God."

== Apologetics ==
Schaeffer's approach to Christian apologetics was primarily influenced by Herman Dooyeweerd, Edward John Carnell, and Cornelius Van Til, but he was not known to be a strict presuppositionalist in the Van Tillian tradition. His approach to culture was heavily influenced by his friendship with Hans Rookmaaker. In a 1948 article in The Bible Today, Schaeffer explained his own apologetics and how he walked a middle path between evidentialism and presuppositionalism, noting that "If the unsaved man was consistent he would be an atheist in religion, an irrationalist in philosophy (including a complete uncertainty concerning 'natural laws'), and completely a-moral in the widest sense." J. Budziszewski summarizes the article about this middle path approach by writing:

Presuppositionalists, he held, are right to assert that the ultimate premises of Christian and anti–Christian systems of thought are utterly at odds in relation to their origin. On the other hand, evidentialists are right to assert that between Christian and anti–Christian systems of thought there is always a point of contact in the shape of reality itself. The reason for this point of contact, he argued, is that nonbelievers cannot bring themselves to be completely consistent with their own presuppositions, and this inconsistency is a result of what many call common grace and is in fact the reality of God having made, and spoken into, a defined and unavoidable creation. "Thus, illogically", he wrote, "men have in their accepted worldviews various amounts of that which is ours. But, illogical though it may be, it is there and we can appeal to it."

Schaeffer came to use this middle path as the basis for his method of evangelism which he called "Taking the roof off". An example of Taking the roof off in written form can be found in Schaeffer's work entitled Death in the City. Nancy Pearcey also describes two books by Schaeffer, Escape From Reason and The God Who Is There in this way:

In these books, Schaeffer explains the history of the two-story division of knowledge, often referred to as the fact/value split. He also describes his apologetics method, which combined elements of both evidentialism and presuppositionalism.

=== Influence of Rushdoony ===
In the 1960s Schaeffer read the works of Reconstructionist theologian Rousas John Rushdoony with appreciation, and according to Barry Hankins, "it is quite likely that Schaeffer's belief that the United States was founded on a Christian base came in part from Rushdoony." Schaeffer later lost this fervor because Rushdoony was a postmillennialist, holding the doctrine that the kingdom of God will be built on earth before the second coming of Jesus, while Schaeffer was a premillennialist, holding that the kingdom of God will only be ushered in with the second coming.

Schaeffer thought that Rushdoony's system would require a merger of church and state, which he opposed. He held that the principles, not the actual details, of Old Testament civil law were applicable under the New Covenant of Jesus. He wrote "The moral law [of the Old Testament], of course, is constant, but the civil law only was operative for the Old Testament theocracy. I do not think there is any indication of a theocracy in the New Testament until Christ returns as king."

== Legacy ==
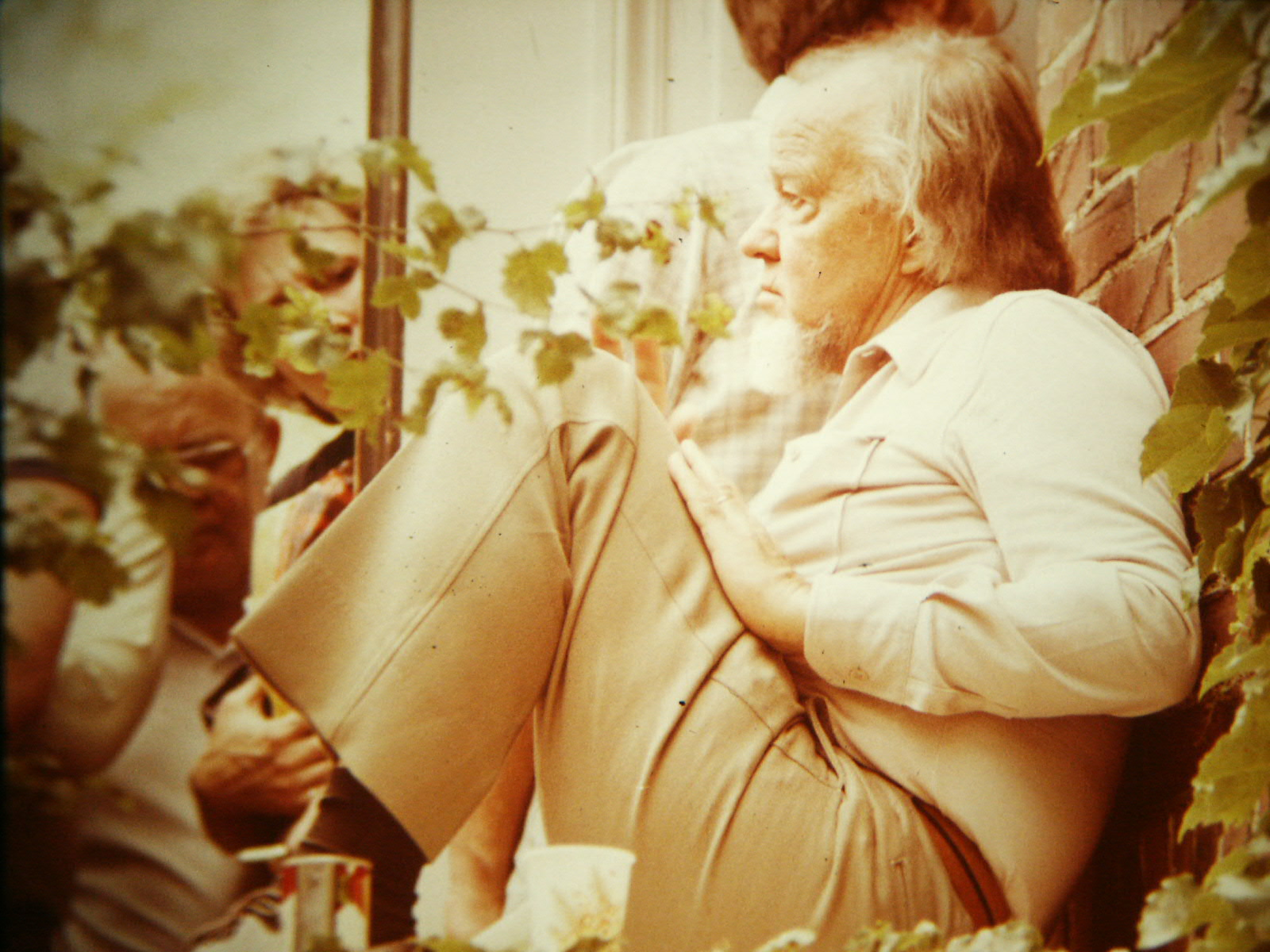
Schaeffer in Urbana, Illinois, 1981

The Francis A. Schaeffer Foundation in Gryon, Switzerland is led by one of his daughters and sons-in-law as a small-scale alternative to the original L'Abri Fellowship International, which is still operating in nearby Huemoz-sur-Ollon and other places in the world. Covenant Theological Seminary has established the Francis A. Schaeffer Institute directed by a former English L'Abri member, Jerram Barrs. The purpose of the school is to train Christians to demonstrate compassionately and defend reasonably what they see as the claims of Christ on all of life.

According to Michael Hamilton of Christianity Today, "Perhaps no intellectual save C. S. Lewis affected the thinking of evangelicals more profoundly [than Francis Schaeffer]; perhaps no leader of the period save Billy Graham left a deeper stamp on the movement as a whole."

=== Institute of Church Leadership ===
In 1978, Schaeffer asked a group of Reformed Episcopal Clergy to research his thoughts and current trends, forming a church guild called "The Society of Reformed Philosophical Thinkers". This was merged in 1988 with "Into Thy Word Ministries", which was then transformed into "The Francis A. Schaeffer Institute of Church Leadership Development" in 1998. Its purpose is to strategize how to reach and train pastors and church leaders to focus on Christ centered principles. Its aim is to point the church back to "true-Truth" and "true spirituality". The foundation develops comprehensive curriculum for pastors, church planters and church leaders.

=== Seven Mountain Mandate ===
In 1975, along with fellow evangelists Bill Bright (founder of Campus Crusade for Christ) and Loren Cunningham (founder of Youth With a Mission), Schaeffer was one of the founders of what would later be termed the Seven Mountain Mandate. The idea would later go on to be popularized by Bethel Church pastor Bill Johnson and Lance Wallnau, among others. The concept centers around Christians taking dominion of seven societal spheres of influence: "family, religion, education, media, art, economics, and government."

=== Political activism ===
Schaeffer is credited with helping spark a return to political activism among Protestant evangelicals and fundamentalists in the late 1970s and early 1980s, especially in relation to the issue of abortion. In his memoir Crazy for God, Schaeffer's son Frank takes credit for pressing his father to take on the abortion issue, which Schaeffer initially considered "too political". Schaeffer called for a challenge to what he saw as the increasing influence of secular humanism. Schaeffer's views were expressed in two works, his book entitled A Christian Manifesto, as well as the book and film series, Whatever Happened to the Human Race?.

=== A Christian Manifesto ===
Schaeffer's book A Christian Manifesto was published in 1981 and later delivered as a sermon in 1982. It was intended as a Christian answer to The Communist Manifesto of 1848 and the Humanist Manifesto documents of 1933 and 1973. Schaeffer's diagnosis is that the decline of Western Civilization is due to society having become increasingly pluralistic, resulting in a shift "away from a world view that was at least vaguely Christian in people's memory… toward something completely different." Schaeffer argues that there is a philosophical struggle between the people of God and the secular humanists.

In the sermon version of the book, Schaeffer defines secular humanism as the worldview where "man is the measure of all things". He claims that critics of the Christian right miss the mark by confusing the "humanist religion" with humanitarianism, the humanities, or love of humans. He describes the conflict with secular humanism as a battle in which "these two religions, Christianity and humanism, stand over against each other as totalities." He writes that the decline of commitment to objective truth that he perceives in the various institutions of society is "not because of a conspiracy, but because the church has forsaken its duty to be the salt of the culture."

A true Christian in Hitler's Germany and in the occupied countries should have defied the false and counterfeit state and hidden his Jewish neighbors from the German SS Troops. The government had abrogated its authority, and it had no right to make any demands.

He then suggests that similar tactics be used to stop abortion. But Schaeffer argues he is not talking about a theocracy:

State officials must know that we are serious about stopping abortion… First, we must make definite that we are in no way talking about any kind of theocracy. Let me say that with great emphasis. Witherspoon, Jefferson, the American Founders had no idea of a theocracy. That is made plain by the First Amendment, and we must continually emphasize the fact that we are not talking about some kind, or any kind, of a theocracy.

Christian Reconstructionists Gary North and David Chilton were highly critical of A Christian Manifesto and Schaeffer. Their critical comments were prompted, they wrote, by the popularity of Schaeffer's book. They suggested that Schaeffer supports pluralism because he sees the First Amendment as freedom of religion for all; and they themselves reject pluralism. Pointing out negative statements Schaeffer made about theocracy, North and Chilton then explain why they promote it. They extend their criticism of Schaeffer:

The fact remains that Dr. Schaeffer's manifesto offers no prescriptions for a Christian society. We mention that merely in the interests of clarity, for we are not sure that anybody has noticed it up to now. The same comment applies to all of Dr. Schaeffer's writings: he does not spell out the Christian alternative.

=== Influence on Christian conservatives ===
Christian conservative leaders such as Tim LaHaye have credited Schaeffer for influencing their theological arguments urging political participation by evangelicals.

Beginning in the 1990s, critics began exploring the intellectual and ideological connection between Schaeffer's political activism and writings of the early 1980s to contemporary religious-political trends in the Christian Right, sometimes grouped under the name Dominionism, with mixed conclusions.

Sara Diamond and Frederick Clarkson have written articles tracing the activism of numerous key figures in the Christian Right to the influence of Francis Schaeffer. According to Diamond: "The idea of taking dominion over secular society gained widespread currency with the 1981 publication of...Schaeffer's book A Christian Manifesto. The book sold 290,000 copies in its first year, and it remains one of the movement's most frequently cited texts." Diamond summarizes the book and its importance to the Christian Right:

In A Christian Manifesto, Schaeffer's argument is simple. The United States began as a nation rooted in Biblical principles. But as society became more pluralistic, with each new wave of immigrants, proponents of a new philosophy of secular humanism gradually came to dominate debate on policy issues. Since humanists place human progress, not God, at the center of their considerations, they pushed American culture in all manner of ungodly directions, the most visible results of which included legalized abortion and the secularization of the public schools. At the end of -- A Christian Manifesto, Schaeffer calls for Christians to use civil disobedience to restore Biblical morality, which explains Schaeffer's popularity with groups like Operation Rescue. Randall Terry has credited Schaeffer as a major influence in his life.

Frederick Clarkson explains that this had practical applications:

"Francis Schaeffer is widely credited with providing the impetus for Protestant evangelical political action against abortion. For example, Randall Terry, the founder of Operation Rescue, says: "You have to read Schaeffer's Christian Manifesto if you want to understand Operation Rescue." Schaeffer, a longtime leader in Rev. Carl McIntire's splinter denomination, the Bible Presbyterian Church, was a reader of Reconstructionist literature but has been reluctant to acknowledge its influence. Indeed, Schaeffer and his followers specifically rejected the modern application of Old Testament law."

Analyses of Schaeffer as the major intellectual influence on Dominionism can be found in the works of authors such as Diamond and Chip Berlet. Other authors argue against a close connection with dominionism, for example Irving Hexham of the University of Calgary, who maintains that Schaeffer's political position has been misconstrued as advocating the Dominionist views of R. J. Rushdoony, who is a Christian Reconstructionist. Hexham indicates that Schaeffer's essential philosophy was derived from Herman Dooyeweerd, not Rushdoony, and that Hans Rookmaaker introduced Schaeffer to his writings. Dooyeweerd was a Dutch legal scholar and philosopher, following in the footsteps of Neo-Calvinist Abraham Kuyper.

Congresswoman and 2012 United States presidential candidate Michele Bachmann has cited Schaeffer's documentary series How Should We Then Live? as having a "profound influence" on her life and that of her husband Marcus.

== Writings ==
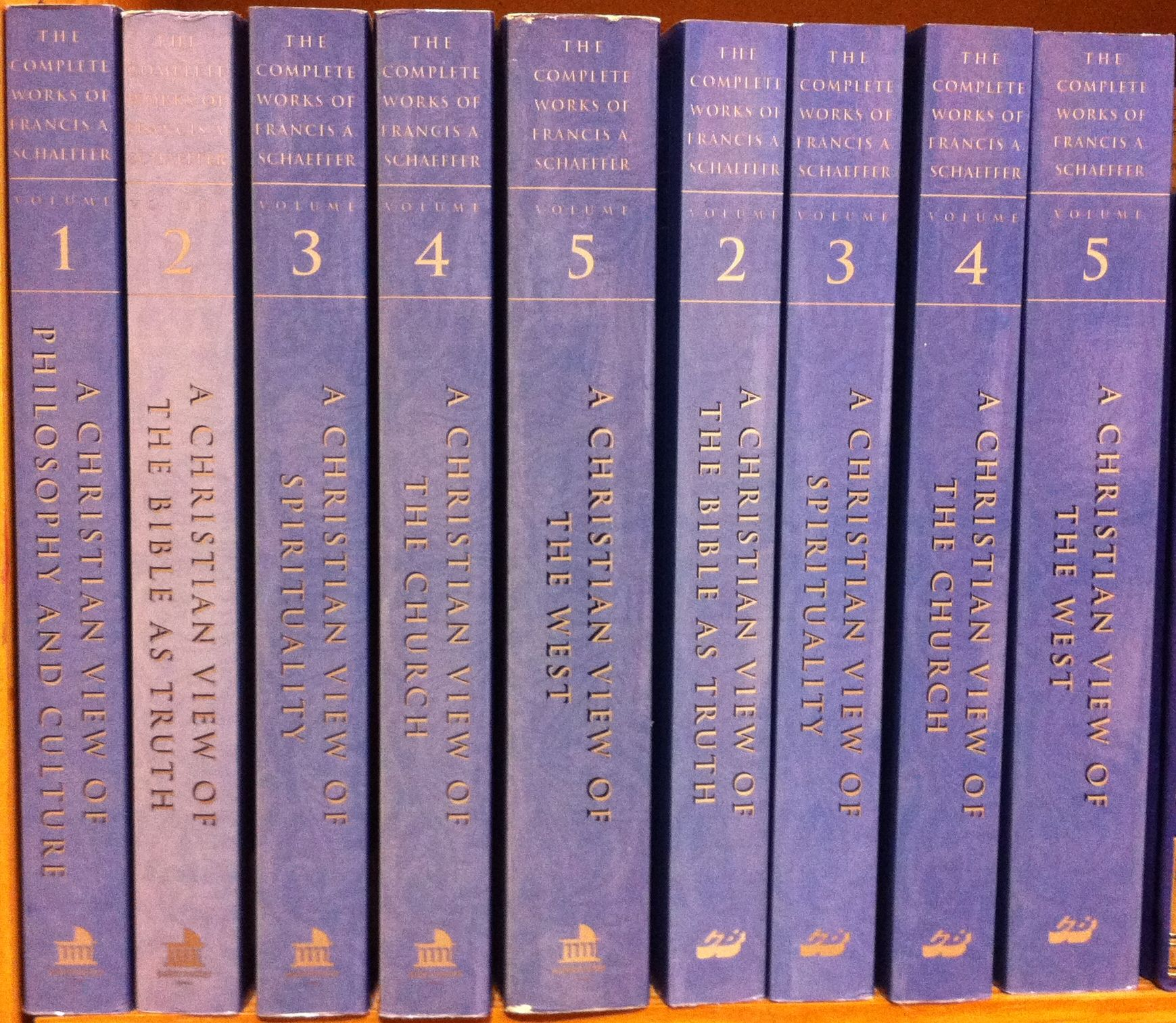
The complete works of Francis Schaeffer.

Francis A. Schaeffer wrote twenty-three books, which covering a range of issues. They can be roughly split into five sections, as in the edition of his Complete Works (ISBN 0-89107-347-7):

- A Christian View of Philosophy and Culture: The first three books in this block are known as Schaeffer's "trilogy", laying down the apologetical, philosophical, epistemological, and theological foundation for all his work.
  - The God Who Is There: Deals with the existence and relevance of God, and how modern man came to first distance himself from, and ultimately disbelieve, God as revealed by the Bible.
  - Escape from Reason: How the rejection of the biblical God causes man to lose contact with reality and reason.
  - He Is There and He Is Not Silent: How God speaks to man through the Bible on the three philosophically fundamental areas of metaphysics, morals, and epistemology.
  - Back to Freedom and Dignity: An answer to B.F. Skinner's Beyond Freedom and Dignity, arguing that freedom and dignity of man are God-given and therefore can't be left aside without dire consequences.
- A Christian View of the Bible as Truth
  - Genesis in Space and Time: Argues that the historical (as opposed to literalist or figurative) view of Genesis as historically true is fundamental to the Christian faith.
  - No Final Conflict
  - Joshua and the Flow of Biblical History
  - Basic Bible Studies: biblical studies on the fundamentals of the faith.
  - Art and the Bible
- A Christian View of Spirituality
  - No Little People: Argues that Christians should never despair of having a significant life of realizations, small as they seem to be.
  - True Spirituality: The spiritual foundation for Schaeffer's work, as a complement to the theological and philosophical approach of most other books. Useful for gaining a balanced view of the whole of Schaeffer's life and ministry.
  - The New Super-Spirituality: Claims the intellectual decadence of students and the counter-culture from the late sixties to the early seventies can be traced back to the conformism of their fathers, only with fewer moral absolutes, and predicts the contamination of the church. Offers an analysis of Postmodernism.
  - Two Contents, Two Realities: First presented as a position paper at the First International Congress on World Evangelization at Lausanne, Switzerland in 1974.
- A Christian View of the Church
  - The Church at the End of the Twentieth Century
  - The Church Before the Watching World
  - The Mark of the Christian: Analyzes the balance between the holiness of God and the love of God in the spiritual life of the Bible-believing Christian.
  - Death in the City
  - The Great Evangelical Disaster
- A Christian View of the West
  - Pollution and the Death of Man. A Christian response to issues concerning ecology.
  - How Should We Then Live? The Rise and Decline of Western Thought and Culture. This is also a film/video series produced and directed by his son Frank Schaeffer.
  - Whatever Happened to the Human Race? (with future Surgeon General Dr. C. Everett Koop). A Christian response to abortion, euthanasia, and infanticide. This is also a film/video series produced and directed by his son Frank Schaeffer.
  - A Christian Manifesto: Christian principles for secular politics.

The Complete Works set omits his booklet Baptism (1976). In addition to his books, one of the last public lectures Schaeffer delivered was at the Law Faculty, University of Strasbourg. It was published as "Christian Faith and Human Rights", The Simon Greenleaf Law Review, 2 (1982–83) pp. 3–12. Most of his writings during his Bible Presbyterian days have not been collected, nor reprinted in decades.

In addition to the five volume Complete Works listed above there were also two books by Dr. Schaeffer published after his death:

- Dennis, Lane T. (ed) Letters of Francis A. Schaeffer, Crossway Books, Westchester, 1985.
- Schaeffer, Francis A. The Finished Work of Christ: The Truth of Romans 1–8, Crossway Books, Wheaton, 1998.

== Films ==
Schaeffer was persuaded to adapt his book How Should We Then Live? The Rise and Decline of Western Thought and Culture to film by Gospel Films, Inc. CEO and executive evangelical media producer Billy Zeoli who pitched the idea of hiring Schaeffer's then recently married son, teenage father, and painter Frank Schaeffer as a producer for the film project. Zeoli was instrumental in providing the Schaeffers with introductions to wealthy American evangelicals who would eventually bankroll the How We Should Then Live film project. This book is still being read and used today in American Universities as well as in various small group studies to help shed light on the contemporary cultural problems of the past and how they have led to many of the issues that America is facing today.

Issues such as race, apathy, abortion, and the non-compassionate use of wealth are topics still relevant today. Schaeffer argues that the humanist base for morals is fundamentally a weak base upon which to build a moral framework for society. By contrast, the Bible, understood as the revealed revelation from God is able to provide a fundamentally sound basis for societal norms as well as a base for science. The president of Christian Leaders Institute (CLI), Henry Reyenga Jr., secured rights to post this film series in an ethics class at CLI. This freemium ministry training school lists "deceased" Francis Schaeffer on its faculty.

The American distribution of the book and film was responsible for bringing many evangelical Protestants into the then largely Roman Catholic public protest movement against the United States Supreme Court Roe v. Wade decision, 410 U.S. 113 (1973) supporting legal abortion in the United States.

- How Should We Then Live? The Rise and Decline of Western Thought and Culture (1976). Frank Schaeffer produced his father Francis Schaeffer's film series, which was released with a book by the same title.
- Whatever Happened to the Human Race? (1979). A Christian response to abortion, euthanasia, and infanticide, narrated by Francis Schaeffer and future Surgeon General Dr. C. Everett Koop; it was released with a book by the same title.

== Notes ==
=== Cited sources ===
- Duriez, Colin (2008), Francis Schaeffer, An Authentic Life (PDF), Wheaton, IL: Crossway Books, archived from the original (PDF) on June 21, 2015.
- Schaeffer, Frank (2007), Crazy for God: How I Grew Up as One of the Elect, Helped Found the Religious Right, and Lived to Take All (or Almost All) of It Back, Da Capo Press, ISBN 978-0-7867-1891-7.
