= Julie Vargas =

American educator (born 1938)

Julie S. Vargas
- Born: Julie Skinner; 1938 (age 87–88); Minneapolis, Minnesota, U.S.
- Education: Radcliffe College (BA); Columbia University (MA); University of Pittsburgh (PhD)
- Occupation: Academic
- Employer: B. F. Skinner Foundation
- Title: President
- Spouse: Ernest A. Vargas

Julie Vargas (2019)

Julie Skinner Vargas (born 1938) is an American educator who has written extensively on the science of behavior.

Vargas is the daughter of B.F. Skinner and is the president of the B. F. Skinner Foundation, in Cambridge, Massachusetts. She is an officer of The International Society for Behaviorology.

== Biography ==
Vargas received a bachelor's degree in music from Radcliffe College, a master's degree in music education from Columbia University and a Ph.D. in educational research from the University of Pittsburgh. She was a faculty member at West Virginia University, where she and her husband, Ernest A. Vargas, taught for more than 30 years in the College of Human Resources and Education.

== Behaviorology: Skinner's new science ==
Vargas has written that "What B. F. Skinner began is not an 'approach', 'view', 'discipline', 'field', or 'theory'. It was, and is, a science, differing from psychology in its dependent variables, its measurement system, its procedures, and its analytic framework". She and a number of her colleagues have given Skinner's science the name "behaviorology", which may be defined as the natural science of the behavior of organisms.

== Bibliography ==
- Writing Worthwhile Behavioral Objectives, 1973, Harper & Row
- Behavioral Psychology for Teachers, 1977, Harper & Row
- Bernice Stewart, Julie S. Vargas (1990). Teaching Behavior to Infants and Toddlers: A Manual for Caregivers and Parents. C.C. Thomas. ISBN 0-398-05638-2.
- Vargas, Julie S. (2013). Behavior Analysis for Effective Teaching. Lawrence Erlbaum Associates. ISBN 978-0-415-52680-7.
- Vargas, Julie Skinner (1969). Item Selection Techniques for Norm-referenced and Criterion-referenced Tests. University of Pittsburgh.

Her more recent publications have been articles, including two 2005 entries on B. F. Skinner in volumes I and III of The Encyclopedia of Behavior Modification and Cognitive Behavior Therapy, and Behavior Analysis for Effective Teaching. with Routledge, Taylor and Francis, 2012.
