= He Is There and He Is Not Silent =

1972 book by Francis Schaeffer

- Author: Francis A. Schaeffer
- Publication date: 1972

He Is There and He Is Not Silent is a philosophical work written by American apologist and Christian theologian Francis A. Schaeffer, Wheaton, IL:Tyndale House, first published in 1972. It is Book Three in Volume One of The Complete Works of Francis A. Schaeffer A Christian Worldview. Westchester, IL:Crossway Books, 1982. This is the third book of Francis Schaeffer's "Trilogy."

== Overview ==
He Is There and He Is Not Silent is divided into four chapters, followed by two appendices. The first of these chapters deals with metaphysics; the second, morals; and the third and fourth, epistemology. The first appendix concerns revelation and the second the concept of faith. To give the reader an idea of what the book is about, an overview of "Chapter 1. The Metaphysical Necessity" is presented.

== Table of contents ==
Introduction

Chapter 1. The Metaphysical Necessity

In the opening chapter, Schaeffer, after briefly defining "metaphysics," states two dilemmas concerning humankind. First, he claims that humans exhibit "mannishness" and have a personal nature, separating them from the impersonal, but that humans are also finite. Second, he points out the contrast between the nobility and the cruelty of man. He then presents his view of the two classes of answers to these dilemmas.

First, what Schaeffer calls the "Line of Despair" (and associates with existentialism): that there is no logical answer to the dilemmas, and that all is "chaotic, irrational, and absurd." Schaeffer characterizes this view as impossible to hold in practice, because order is necessary for life. Schaeffer also accuses advocates of this viewpoint of utilizing logic when it suits their arguments, but attacking logic when it is convenient.

The second class of answers Schaeffer postulates is that logic exists, and that the subject of metaphysics is open to rational discussion. Within this category, Schaeffer discusses three specific answers: first, existence ex nihilo, that all that exists "has come out of absolutely nothing." Schaeffer labels this answer "unthinkable." Second, Schaeffer lists the "impersonal beginning," and along with it, "reductionism." His criticism is that such an answer fails to give meaning or significance to particulars. Furthermore, he alleges that there is no proof that an impersonal beginning could produce complexity or personality. Schaeffer also attacks pantheism in this vein, which he labels "paneverythingism," propounding that while it provides an answer for unity and universals, it fails to explain the origin of diversity and particulars.

Finally, Schaeffer introduces the answer of the personal beginning. In addition to providing an explanation for both complexity and personality, Schaeffer writes that the answer to the dilemma of both unity/universals and diversity/particulars may be found in the doctrine of the Trinity.

Returning to the two dilemmas given at the beginning of the chapter, Schaeffer describes what he calls the "Personal-Infinite God." On the side of personality, Schaeffer posits a "chasm" between God and Man, on the one side, and the animal, the flower, and the machine on the other. On the side of infiniteness, Schaeffer moves the chasm to between God and Man. The existence of this "complete chasm," Schaeffer says, is the origin of our confusion on issues of metaphysics.

Schaeffer finishes the chapter by concluding that there is a "God who is there," reprising the titular phrase of his book, The God Who Is There. However, he extends beyond this by describing revelatory knowledge, via the idea that God has spoken: "He is not silent."

Chapter 2. The Moral Necessity

Chapter 3. The Epistemological Necessity: The Problem

Chapter 4. The Epistemological Necessity: The Answer

Appendix A. Is Propositional Revelation Nonsense?

Appendix B. "Faith" Versus Faith
