= Mark of the Christian =

1970 book

- Author: Francis Schaeffer
- Genre: Religion
- Publication date: 1970

Mark of the Christian is a work by Francis Schaeffer concerning the spiritual life of the Bible.

== Overview ==
This short work by Dr. Schaeffer is not deep into theology or philosophy. It is simple and to the point. There are two passages of Scripture that are primarily utilized as the context. One is John 13:34, 35 where Jesus says, "A new commandment I give to you, that you love one another, even as I have loved you, that you also love one another. By this all men will know that you are My disciples, if you have love for one another" (NASB). The other is John 17:21 where Jesus is praying to the Father "that they all may be one; even as Thou, Father, art in Me, and I in Thee, that they also may be in Us; that the world may believe that Thou didst send Me" (NASB).

The Mark of the Christian, as Schaeffer says the Bible defines it, is Christian Love. It is not a mushy, gooey, romantic love, but one that is practical and that a watching (sinful) world can see. This love is one that knows how to say, "I’m sorry," and that knows how to openly forgive. This love should also not be equated to organizational unity. In contrast to that it means unity stemming from the common bond of caring for each other. Schaeffer sites the Catholic Church as one that has organizational unity. Yet it is cutting itself to ribbons from within. Many Protestant denominations could fall into this same type of unity.

Schaeffer also writes (p. 184) that, while this particular category of love is just for other Christians alone, Christians are also to love humans outside the Church as well:

All men bear the image of God. They have value, not because they are redeemed, but because they are God's creation in God's image. Modern man, who has rejected this, has no clue as to who he is, and because of this he can find no real value for himself or for other men. Hence, he downgrades the value of other men and produces the horrible thing we face today — a sick culture in which men treat men as inhuman, as machines. As Christians, however, we know the value of men.
All men are our neighbors, and we are to love them as ourselves. We are to do this on the basis of creation, even if they are not redeemed, for all men have value because they are made in the image of God. Therefore they are to be loved even at great cost.

The most important thing, however, that Schaeffer says in this work is what he calls The Final Apologetic. If we as Christians do not love each other, than the world will say that God did not send Christ as the gospel proclaims. Within the framework of the Final Apologetic, we as Christians have a responsibility to live the gospel and in such a way that the dying and hurting world may see it and seek after it. Schaeffer then concludes this short book (p. 204) by saying:

What then shall we conclude but that as the Samaritan loved the wounded man, we as Christians are called upon to love all men as neighbors, loving them as ourselves. Second, that we are to love all true Christian brothers in a way that the world may observe. This means showing love to our brothers in the midst of our differences-great or small-loving our brothers when it costs us something, loving them even under times of tremendous emotional tension, loving them in a way the world can see. In short, we are to practice and exhibit the holiness of God and the love of God, for without this we grieve the Holy Spirit.
Love-and the unity it attests to-is the mark Christ gave Christians to wear before the world. Only with this mark may the world know that Christians are indeed Christians and that Jesus was sent by the Father.

The work is then ended with a short poem called Lament by Evangeline Paterson (p. 205):

Weep, weep for those
Who do the work of the Lord
With a high look
And a proud heart.
Their voice is lifted up
In the streets, and their cry is heard.
The bruised reed they break
By their great strength, and the smoking flax
They trample.

Weep not for the quenched
(For their God will hear their cry
And the Lord will come to save them)
But weep, weep for the quenchers

For when the Day of the Lord
Is come, and the vales sing
And the hills clap their hands
And the light shines

Then their eyes shall be opened
On a waste place,
Smouldering,
The smoke of the flax bitter
In their nostrils,
Their feet pierced
By broken reed-stems . . .
Wood, hay, and stubble,
And no grass springing.
And all the birds flown.

Weep, weep for those
Who have made a desert
In the name of the Lord.

Schaeffer considered this booklet to be one of his most important works. This is shown by the fact that in his lifetime it was published in four different forms. First it was published by itself (InterVarsity, 1970). Then an essay from it was written for Christianity Today (September 11, 1970). It was published as an appendix to The Church At The End of the Twentieth Century (InterVarsity, 1970). It was included in The Complete Works... as cited above. Then it was included as an appendix to The Great Evangelical Disaster (Crossway, 1984) which was the last book Schaeffer wrote before his death in May 1984.

One reviewer (Robinson, 1971) wrote that "Excellent reading is offered Christians who want to practice and exhibit both the holiness of God and the love of God."

Yet maybe the greatest tribute to its importance to evangelicals was when Christianity Today published it again in the March 6, 1995 issue (pp. 27–33), eleven years after his death. In the preface to that reprint (p. 27) the editor writes of how Schaeffer was not a stranger to controversy and to schisms in Protestant denominations. "He did, however," writes the editor, "articulate a theology of disagreement...His pointed challenges remind us that we must not only choose the right battles, but also choose the right way to fight" (italics added for emphasis).
