= B. F. Skinner =

American psychologist and social philosopher (1904–1990)

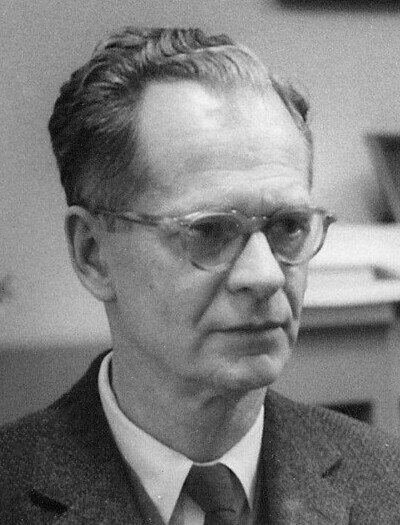
- Skinner c. 1950
- Born: Burrhus Frederic Skinner; March 20, 1904; Susquehanna, Pennsylvania, U.S.
- Died: August 18, 1990 (aged 86); Cambridge, Massachusetts, U.S.
- Education: Hamilton College (AB); Harvard University (PhD)
- Known for: Behavior analysis Operant conditioning Radical behaviorism Verbal Behavior (1957)
- Spouse: Yvonne (Eve) Blue (m. 1936)
- Children: Julie and Deborah
- Awards: National Medal of Science (1968); Ig Nobel Peace Prize (2024)
- Scientific career
- Fields: Psychology, linguistics, philosophy
- Workplaces: University of Minnesota; Indiana University; Harvard University

Burrhus Frederic Skinner (March 20, 1904 – August 18, 1990) was an American psychologist, behaviorist, inventor, and social philosopher. He was the Edgar Pierce Professor of Psychology at Harvard University from 1948 until his retirement in 1974.

Skinner developed behavior analysis, especially the philosophy of radical behaviorism, and founded the experimental analysis of behavior, a school of experimental research psychology. He also used operant conditioning to strengthen behavior, considering the rate of response to be the most effective measure of response strength. To study operant conditioning, he invented the operant conditioning chamber (aka the Skinner box), and to measure rate he invented the cumulative recorder. Using these tools, he and Charles Ferster produced Skinner's most influential experimental work, outlined in their 1957 book Schedules of Reinforcement.

Skinner was a prolific author, publishing 21 books and 180 articles. He imagined the application of his ideas to the design of a human community in his 1948 utopian novel, Walden Two, while his analysis of human behavior culminated in his 1958 work, Verbal Behavior.

Skinner, John B. Watson, and Ivan Pavlov are considered to be the pioneers of modern behaviorism. A June 2002 survey listed Skinner as the most influential psychologist of the 20th century.

== Early life ==
Skinner was born in Susquehanna, Pennsylvania, to Grace and William Skinner, the latter, who was a lawyer. Skinner became an atheist after a Christian teacher tried to assuage his fear of the hell that his grandmother described. His brother Edward, two and a half years younger, died at age 16 of a cerebral hemorrhage.

Skinner's closest friend as a young boy was Raphael Miller, whom he called Doc because his father was a doctor. Doc and Skinner became friends due to their parents' religiousness and both had an interest in contraptions and gadgets. They had set up a telegraph line between their houses to send messages to each other, although they had to call each other on the telephone due to the confusing messages sent back and forth. During one summer, Doc and Skinner started an elderberry business to gather berries and sell them door to door. They found that when they picked the ripe berries, the unripe ones came off the branches too, so they built a device that was able to separate them. The device was a bent piece of metal to form a trough. They would pour water down the trough into a bucket, and the ripe berries would sink into the bucket and the unripe ones would be pushed over the edge to be thrown away.

== Education ==
Skinner attended Hamilton College in Clinton, New York, with the intention of becoming a writer. He found himself at a social disadvantage at the college because of his intellectual attitude. He was a member of Lambda Chi Alpha fraternity.

He wrote for the school paper, but, as an atheist, he was critical of the traditional mores of his college. After receiving his Bachelor of Arts in English literature in 1926, he attended Harvard University, where he would later research and teach. While attending Harvard, a fellow student, Fred S. Keller, convinced Skinner that he could make an experimental science of the study of behavior. This led Skinner to invent a prototype for the Skinner box and to join Keller in the creation of other tools for small experiments.

After graduation, Skinner unsuccessfully tried to write a novel while he lived with his parents, a period that he later called the "Dark Years". He became disillusioned with his literary skills despite encouragement from the poet Robert Frost, concluding that he had little world experience and no strong personal perspective from which to write. His encounter with John B. Watson's behaviorism led him into graduate study in psychology and to the development of his own version of behaviorism.

== Career ==
Skinner received a PhD from Harvard in 1931, and remained there as a researcher for some years. In 1936, he went to the University of Minnesota in Minneapolis to teach. In 1945, he moved to Indiana University, where he was chair of the psychology department from 1946 to 1947, before returning to Harvard as a tenured professor in 1948. He remained at Harvard for the rest of his life. In 1973, Skinner was one of the signers of the Humanist Manifesto II.

== Personal life ==
In 1936, Skinner married Yvonne "Eve" Blue. The couple had two daughters, Julie (later Vargas) and Deborah (later Buzan; married Barry Buzan). Yvonne died in 1997, and is buried in Mount Auburn Cemetery, Cambridge, Massachusetts.

== Death ==
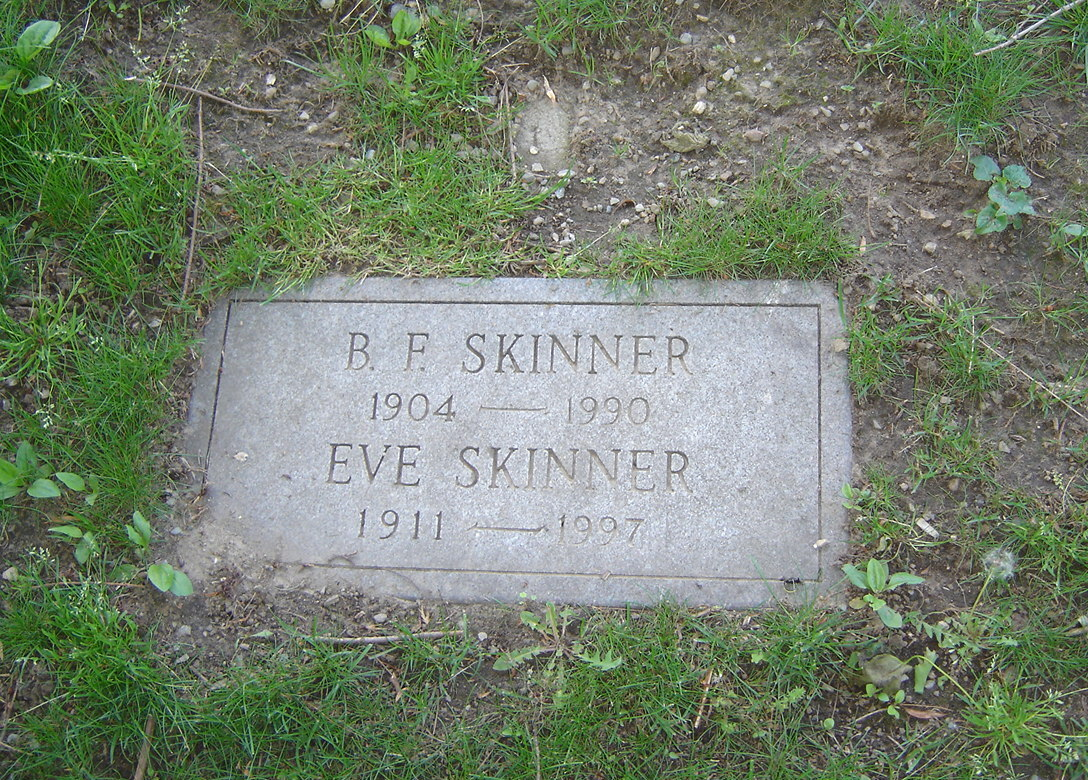
The gravestone of B. F. Skinner and his wife Eve at Mount Auburn Cemetery

Skinner's public exposure had increased in the 1970s, he remained active even after his retirement in 1974, until his death. In 1989, Skinner was diagnosed with leukemia and died on August 18, 1990, in Cambridge, Massachusetts. Ten days before his death, he was given the lifetime achievement award by the American Psychological Association and gave a talk concerning his work.

== Contributions to psychology ==
=== Behaviorism ===
Skinner referred to his approach to the study of behavior as radical behaviorism, which originated in the early 1900s as a reaction to depth psychology and other traditional forms of psychology, which often had difficulty making predictions that could be tested experimentally. This philosophy of behavioral science assumes that behavior is a consequence of environmental histories of reinforcement (see applied behavior analysis). In his words:

The position can be stated as follows: what is felt or introspectively observed is not some nonphysical world of consciousness, mind, or mental life but the observer's own body. This does not mean, as I shall show later, that introspection is a kind of psychological research, nor does it mean (and this is the heart of the argument) that what are felt or introspectively observed are the causes of the behavior. An organism behaves as it does because of its current structure, but most of this is out of reach of introspection. At the moment we must content ourselves, as the methodological behaviorist insists, with a person's genetic and environment histories. What are introspectively observed are certain collateral products of those histories.... In this way we repair the major damage wrought by mentalism. When what a person does [is] attributed to what is going on inside him, investigation is brought to an end. Why explain the explanation? For twenty-five hundred years people have been preoccupied with feelings and mental life, but only recently has any interest been shown in a more precise analysis of the role of the environment. Ignorance of that role led in the first place to mental fictions, and it has been perpetuated by the explanatory practices to which they gave rise.

Especially in understanding how reinforcement and punishment shape behavior, B.F. Skinner's research on operant conditioning has had a large impact on the field of psychology. Skinner developed the Skinner box, which highlighted how carefully controlled environments could be used to observe learning procession accurately. Operant principles apply not only to the behavior of animals but also to human contexts such as therapy, education, and the workplace. Modern research continues to expand upon these ideas. Operant conditioning remains one of the central frameworks for interpreting how consequences impact actions in the future.

=== Foundations of Skinner's behaviorism ===
Skinner's ideas about behaviorism were largely set forth in his first book, The Behavior of Organisms (1938). Here, he gives a systematic description of the manner in which environmental variables control behavior. He distinguished two sorts of behavior which are controlled in different ways:

- Respondent behaviors are elicited by stimuli, and may be modified through respondent conditioning, often called classical (or pavlovian) conditioning, in which a neutral stimulus is paired with an eliciting stimulus. Such behaviors may be measured by their latency or strength.
- Operant behaviors are 'emitted', meaning that initially they are not induced by any particular stimulus. They are strengthened through operant conditioning (aka instrumental conditioning), in which the occurrence of a response yields a reinforcer. Such behaviors may be measured by their rate.

Both of these sorts of behavior had already been studied experimentally, most notably: respondents, by Ivan Pavlov; and operants, by Edward Thorndike. Skinner's account differed in some ways from earlier ones, and was one of the first accounts to bring them under one roof.

The idea that behavior is strengthened or weakened by its consequences raises several questions. Among the most commonly asked are these:

1. Operant responses are strengthened by reinforcement, but where do they come from in the first place?
2. Once it is in the organism's repertoire, how is a response directed or controlled?
3. How can very complex and seemingly novel behaviors be explained?

==== 1. Origin of operant behavior ====
Skinner's answer to the first question was very much like Darwin's answer to the question of the origin of a 'new' bodily structure, namely, variation and selection. Similarly, the behavior of an individual varies from moment to moment; a variation that is followed by reinforcement is strengthened and becomes prominent in that individual's behavioral repertoire. Shaping was Skinner's term for the gradual modification of behavior by the reinforcement of desired variations. Skinner believed that 'superstitious' behavior can arise when a response happens to be followed by reinforcement to which it is actually unrelated.

==== 2. Control of operant behavior ====
The second question, "how is operant behavior controlled?" arises because, to begin with, the behavior is "emitted" without reference to any particular stimulus. Skinner answered this question by saying that a stimulus comes to control an operant if it is present when the response is reinforced and absent when it is not. For example, if lever-pressing only brings food when a light is on, a rat, or a child, will learn to press the lever only when the light is on. Skinner summarized this relationship by saying that a discriminative stimulus (e.g. light or sound) sets the occasion for the reinforcement (food) of the operant (lever-press). This three-term contingency (stimulus-response-reinforcer) is one of Skinner's most important concepts, and sets his theory apart from theories that use only pair-wise associations.

==== 3. Explaining complex behavior ====
Most behavior of humans cannot easily be described in terms of individual responses reinforced one by one, and Skinner devoted a great deal of effort to the problem of behavioral complexity. Some complex behavior can be seen as a sequence of relatively simple responses, and here Skinner invoked the idea of "chaining". Chaining is based on the fact, experimentally demonstrated, that a discriminative stimulus not only sets the occasion for subsequent behavior, but it can also reinforce a behavior that precedes it. That is, a discriminative stimulus is also a "conditioned reinforcer". For example, the light that sets the occasion for lever pressing may also be used to reinforce "turning around" in the presence of a noise. This results in the sequence "noise – turn-around – light – press lever – food." Much longer chains can be built by adding more stimuli and responses.

However, Skinner recognized that a great deal of behavior, especially human behavior, cannot be accounted for by gradual shaping or the construction of response sequences. Complex behavior often appears suddenly in its final form, as when a person first finds his way to the elevator by following instructions given at the front desk. To account for such behavior, Skinner introduced the concept of rule-governed behavior. First, relatively simple behaviors come under the control of verbal stimuli: the child learns to "jump," "open the book," and so on. After a large number of responses come under such verbal control, a sequence of verbal stimuli can evoke an almost unlimited variety of complex responses.

=== Reinforcement ===
Reinforcement, a key concept of behaviorism, is the primary process that shapes and controls behavior, and occurs in two ways: positive and negative. In The Behavior of Organisms (1938), Skinner defines negative reinforcement to be synonymous with punishment, i.e. the presentation of an aversive stimulus. This definition would subsequently be re-defined in Science and Human Behavior (1953).

In what has now become the standard set of definitions, positive reinforcement is the strengthening of behavior by the occurrence of some event (e.g., praise after some behavior is performed), whereas negative reinforcement is the strengthening of behavior by the removal or avoidance of some aversive event (e.g., opening and raising an umbrella over your head on a rainy day is reinforced by the cessation of rain falling on you).

Both types of reinforcement strengthen behavior, or increase the probability of a behavior reoccurring; the difference being in whether the reinforcing event is something applied (positive reinforcement) or something removed or avoided (negative reinforcement). Punishment can be the application of an aversive stimulus/event (positive punishment or punishment by contingent stimulation) or the removal of a desirable stimulus (negative punishment or punishment by contingent withdrawal). Though punishment is often used to suppress behavior, Skinner argued that this suppression is temporary and has a number of other, often unwanted, consequences. Extinction is the absence of a rewarding stimulus, which weakens behavior.

Writing in 1981, Skinner pointed out that Darwinian natural selection is, like reinforced behavior, "selection by consequences". Though, as he said, natural selection has now "made its case," he regretted that essentially the same process, "reinforcement", was less widely accepted as underlying human behavior.

==== Schedules of reinforcement ====
Skinner recognized that behavior is typically reinforced more than once, and, together with Charles Ferster, he did an extensive analysis of the various ways in which reinforcements could be arranged over time, calling it the schedules of reinforcement.

The most notable schedules of reinforcement studied by Skinner were continuous, interval (fixed or variable), and ratio (fixed or variable). All are methods used in operant conditioning.

- Continuous reinforcement (CRF): each time a specific action is performed the subject receives a reinforcement. This method is effective when teaching a new behavior because it quickly establishes an association between the target behavior and the reinforcer.
- Interval schedule: based on the time intervals between reinforcements.
  - Fixed interval schedule (FI): A procedure in which reinforcements are presented at fixed time periods, provided that the appropriate response is made. This schedule yields a response rate that is low just after reinforcement and becomes rapid just before the next reinforcement is scheduled.
  - Variable interval schedule (VI): A procedure in which behavior is reinforced after scheduled but unpredictable time durations following the previous reinforcement. This schedule yields the most stable rate of responding, with the average frequency of reinforcement determining the frequency of response.
- Ratio schedules: based on the ratio of responses to reinforcements.
  - Fixed ratio schedule (FR): A procedure in which reinforcement is delivered after a specific number of responses have been made.
  - Variable ratio schedule (VR): A procedure in which reinforcement comes after a number of responses that is randomized from one reinforcement to the next (e.g. slot machines). The lower the number of responses required, the higher the response rate tends to be. Variable ratio schedules tend to produce very rapid and steady responding rates in contrast with fixed ratio schedules where the frequency of response usually drops after the reinforcement occurs.

==== Token economy ====
"Skinnerian" principles have been used to create token economies in a number of institutions, such as psychiatric hospitals. When participants behave in desirable ways, their behavior is reinforced with tokens that can be changed for such items as candy, cigarettes, coffee, or the exclusive use of a radio or television set.

=== Verbal Behavior ===
Challenged by Alfred North Whitehead during a casual discussion while at Harvard to provide an account of a randomly provided piece of verbal behavior, Skinner set about attempting to extend his then-new functional, inductive approach to the complexity of human verbal behavior. Developed over two decades, his work appeared in the book Verbal Behavior. Although Noam Chomsky was highly critical of Verbal Behavior, he conceded that Skinner's "S-R psychology" was worth a review. Behavior analysts reject Chomsky's appraisal of Skinner's work as merely "stimulus-response psychology," and some have argued that this mischaracterization highlights a poor understanding of Skinner's work and the field of behavior analysis as a whole.

Verbal Behavior had an uncharacteristically cool reception, partly as a result of Chomsky's review, partly because of Skinner's failure to address or rebut any of Chomsky's criticisms. Skinner's peers may have been slow to adopt the ideas presented in Verbal Behavior because of the absence of experimental evidence—unlike the empirical density that marked Skinner's experimental work.

== Scientific inventions ==
=== Operant conditioning chamber ===
An operant conditioning chamber (also known as a "Skinner box") is a laboratory apparatus used in the experimental analysis of animal behavior. It was invented by Skinner while he was a graduate student at Harvard University. As used by Skinner, the box had a lever (for rats), or a disk in one wall (for pigeons). A press on this "manipulandum" could deliver food to the animal through an opening in the wall, and responses reinforced in this way increased in frequency. By controlling this reinforcement together with discriminative stimuli such as lights and tones, or punishments such as electric shocks, experimenters have used the operant box to study a wide variety of topics, including schedules of reinforcement, discriminative control, delayed response ("memory"), punishment, and so on. By channeling research in these directions, the operant conditioning chamber has had a huge influence on course of research in animal learning and its applications. It enabled great progress on problems that could be studied by measuring the rate, probability, or force of a simple, repeatable response. However, it discouraged the study of behavioral processes not easily conceptualized in such terms—spatial learning, in particular, which is now studied in quite different ways, for example, by the use of the water maze.

=== Cumulative recorder ===
The cumulative recorder makes a pen-and-ink record of simple repeated responses. Skinner designed it for use with the operant chamber as a convenient way to record and view the rate of responses such as a lever press or a key peck. In this device, a sheet of paper gradually unrolls over a cylinder. Each response steps a small pen across the paper, starting at one edge; when the pen reaches the other edge, it quickly resets to the initial side. The slope of the resulting ink line graphically displays the rate of the response; for example, rapid responses yield a steeply sloping line on the paper, slow responding yields a line of low slope. The cumulative recorder was a key tool used by Skinner in his analysis of behavior, and it was very widely adopted by other experimenters, gradually falling out of use with the advent of the laboratory computer and use of line graphs. Skinner's major experimental exploration of response rates, presented in his book with Charles Ferster, Schedules of Reinforcement, is full of cumulative records produced by this device.

=== Air crib ===
The air crib is an easily cleaned, temperature- and humidity-controlled box-bed intended to replace the standard infant crib. After raising one baby, Skinner felt that he could simplify the process for parents and improve the experience for children. He primarily thought of the idea to help his wife cope with the day-to-day tasks of child rearing. Skinner had some specific concerns about raising a baby in the rough environment where he lived in Minnesota. Keeping the child warm was a central priority (Faye, 2010). Though this was the main goal, it also was designed to reduce laundry, diaper rash, and cradle cap, while still allowing the baby to be more mobile and comfortable. Reportedly it had some success in these goals as it was advertised commercially with an estimate of 300 children who were raised in the air crib. Psychology Today tracked down 50 children and ran a short piece on the effects of the air crib. The reports came back positive and that these children and parents enjoyed using the crib (Epstein, 2005). One of these air cribs resides in the gallery at the Center for the History of Psychology in Akron, Ohio (Faye, 2010).

The air crib was designed with three solid walls and a safety-glass panel at the front which could be lowered to move the baby in and out of the crib. The floor was stretched canvas. Sheets were intended to be used over the canvas and were easily rolled off when soiled. Addressing Skinners' concern for temperature, a control box on top of the crib regulated temperature and humidity. Filtered air flowed through the crib from below. This crib was higher than most standard cribs, allowing easier access to the child without the need to bend over (Faye, 2010).

The air crib was a controversial invention. It was popularly characterized as a cruel pen, and it was often compared to Skinner's operant conditioning chamber (or "Skinner box"). Skinner's article in Ladies Home Journal, titled "Baby in a Box", caught the eye of many and contributed to skepticism about the device (Bjork, 1997). A picture published with the article showed the Skinners' daughter, Deborah, peering out of the crib with her hands and face pressed upon the glass. Skinner also used the term "experiment" when describing the crib, and this association with laboratory animal experimentation discouraged the crib's commercial success, although several companies attempted to produce and sell it.

In 2004, therapist Lauren Slater repeated a claim that Skinner may have used his baby daughter in some of his experiments. His outraged daughter publicly accused Slater of not making a good-faith effort to check her facts before publishing. Debora was quoted by the Guardian saying "According to Opening Skinner's Box: Great Psychological Experiments of the Twentieth Century, my father, who was a psychologist based at Harvard from the 1950s to the 90s, "used his infant daughter, Deborah, to prove his theories by putting her for a few hours a day in a laboratory box . . . in which all her needs were controlled and shaped". But it's not true. My father did nothing of the sort."

=== Teaching machine ===
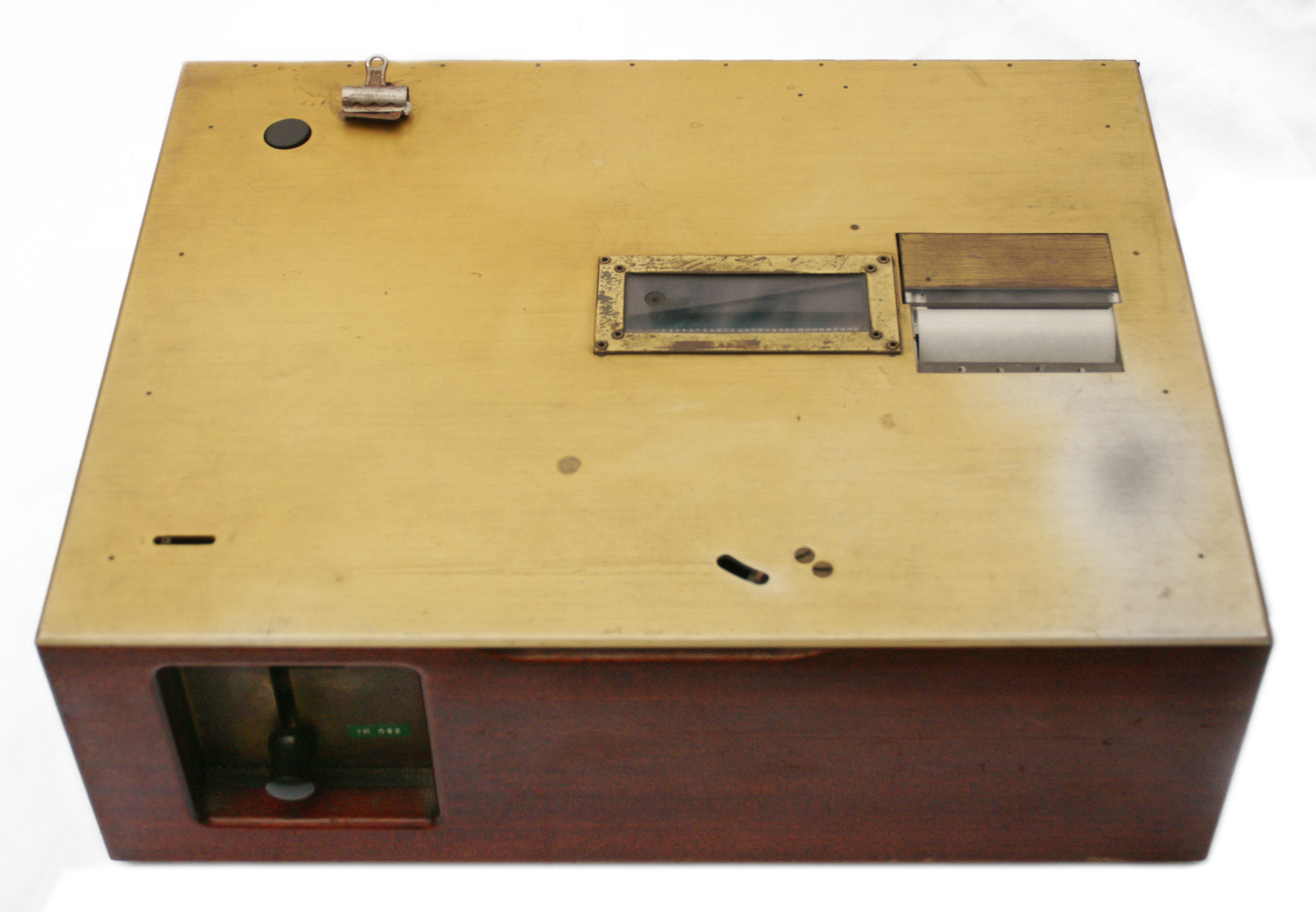
The teaching machine, a mechanical invention to automate the task of programmed learning

The teaching machine was a mechanical device whose purpose was to administer a curriculum of programmed learning. The machine embodies key elements of Skinner's theory of learning and had important implications for education in general and classroom instruction in particular.

In one incarnation, the machine was a box that housed a list of questions that could be viewed one at a time through a small window. (see picture.) There was also a mechanism through which the learner could respond to each question. Upon delivering a correct answer, the learner would be rewarded.

Skinner advocated the use of teaching machines for a broad range of students (e.g., preschool aged to adult) and instructional purposes (e.g., reading and music). For example, one machine that he envisioned could teach rhythm. He wrote:

A relatively simple device supplies the necessary contingencies. The student taps a rhythmic pattern in unison with the device. "Unison" is specified very loosely at first (the student can be a little early or late at each tap) but the specifications are slowly sharpened. The process is repeated for various speeds and patterns. In another arrangement, the student echoes rhythmic patterns sounded by the machine, though not in unison, and again the specifications for an accurate reproduction are progressively sharpened. Rhythmic patterns can also be brought under the control of a printed score.

The instructional potential of the teaching machine stemmed from several factors: it provided automatic, immediate and regular reinforcement without the use of aversive control; the material presented was coherent, yet varied and novel; the pace of learning could be adjusted to suit the individual. As a result, students were interested, attentive, and learned efficiently by producing the desired behavior, "learning by doing."

Teaching machines, though perhaps rudimentary, were not rigid instruments of instruction. They could be adjusted and improved based upon the students' performance. For example, if a student made many incorrect responses, the machine could be reprogrammed to provide less advanced prompts or questions—the idea being that students acquire behaviors most efficiently if they make few errors. Multiple-choice formats were not well-suited for teaching machines because they tended to increase student mistakes, and the contingencies of reinforcement were relatively uncontrolled.

Not only useful in teaching explicit skills, machines could also promote the development of a repertoire of behaviors that Skinner called self-management. Effective self-management means attending to stimuli appropriate to a task, avoiding distractions, reducing the opportunity of reward for competing behaviors, and so on. For example, machines encourage students to pay attention before receiving a reward. Skinner contrasted this with the common classroom practice of initially capturing students' attention (e.g., with a lively video) and delivering a reward (e.g., entertainment) before the students have actually performed any relevant behavior. This practice fails to reinforce correct behavior and actually counters the development of self-management.

Skinner pioneered the use of teaching machines in the classroom, especially at the primary level. Today computers run software that performs similar teaching tasks, and there has been a resurgence of interest in the topic related to the development of adaptive learning systems.

=== Pigeon-guided missile ===
During World War II, the US Navy required a weapon effective against surface ships, such as the German Bismarck class battleships. Although missile and TV technology existed, the size of the primitive guidance systems available rendered automatic guidance impractical. To solve this problem, Skinner initiated Project Pigeon, which was intended to provide a simple and effective guidance system. Skinner trained pigeons through operant conditioning to peck a camera obscura screen showing incoming targets on individual screens (Schultz-Figueroa, 2019). This system divided the nose cone of a missile into three compartments, with a pigeon placed in each. Within the ship, the three lenses projected an image of distant objects onto a screen in front of each bird. Thus, when the missile was launched from an aircraft within sight of an enemy ship, an image of the ship would appear on the screen. The screen was hinged, which connected the screens to the bomb's guidance system. This was done through four small rubber pneumatic tubes that were attached to each side of the frame, which directed a constant airflow to a pneumatic pickup system that controlled the thrusters of the bomb. Resulting in the missile being guided towards the targeted ship, through just the peck coming from the pigeon (Schultz-Figueroa, 2019).

Despite an effective demonstration, the project was abandoned, and eventually more conventional solutions, such as those based on radar, became available. Skinner complained that "our problem was no one would take us seriously." Before the project was completely abandoned it was tested extensively in the laboratory. After the United States Army ultimately denied it the United States Naval Research Laboratory picked up Skinner's Research and renamed it Project ORCON, which was a contraction of "organic" and "control". Skinner worked closely with the US Naval Research Laboratory continuously testing the pigeon's tracking capacity for guiding missiles to their intended targets. In the end, the pigeons' performance and accuracy relied on so many uncontrollable factors that Project ORCON, like Project Pigeon before it, was again discontinued. It was never used in the field.

=== Verbal summator ===
Early in his career Skinner became interested in "latent speech" and experimented with a device he called the verbal summator. This device can be thought of as an auditory version of the Rorschach inkblots. When using the device, human participants listened to incomprehensible auditory "garbage" but often read meaning into what they heard. Thus, as with the Rorschach blots, the device was intended to yield overt behavior that projected subconscious thoughts. Skinner's interest in projective testing was brief, but he later used observations with the summator in creating his theory of verbal behavior. The device also led other researchers to invent new tests such as the tautophone test, the auditory apperception test, and the Azzageddi test.

== Influence on teaching ==
Along with psychology, education has also been influenced by Skinner's views, which are extensively presented in his book The Technology of Teaching, as well as reflected in Fred S. Keller's Personalized System of Instruction and Ogden R. Lindsley's Precision Teaching.

Skinner argued that education has two major purposes:

1. to teach repertoires of both verbal and nonverbal behavior; and
2. to interest students in learning.

He recommended bringing students' behavior under appropriate control by providing reinforcement only in the presence of stimuli relevant to the learning task. Because he believed that human behavior can be affected by small consequences, something as simple as "the opportunity to move forward after completing one stage of an activity" can be an effective reinforcer. Skinner was convinced that, to learn, a student must engage in behavior, and not just passively receive information.

Skinner believed that effective teaching must be based on positive reinforcement which is, he argued, more effective at changing and establishing behavior than punishment. He suggested that the main thing people learn from being punished is how to avoid punishment. For example, if a child is forced to practice playing an instrument, the child comes to associate practicing with punishment and thus develops feelings of dreadfulness and wishes to avoid practicing the instrument. This view had obvious implications for the then widespread practice of rote learning and punitive discipline in education. The use of educational activities as punishment may induce rebellious behavior such as vandalism or absence.

Because teachers are primarily responsible for modifying student behavior, Skinner argued that teachers must learn effective ways of teaching. In The Technology of Teaching (1968), Skinner has a chapter on why teachers fail: He says that teachers have not been given an in-depth understanding of teaching and learning. Without knowing the science underpinning teaching, teachers fall back on procedures that work poorly or not at all, such as:

- using aversive techniques (which produce escape and avoidance and undesirable emotional effects);
- relying on telling and explaining ("Unfortunately, a student does not learn simply when he is shown or told.");
- failing to adapt learning tasks to the student's current level; and
- failing to provide positive reinforcement frequently enough.

Skinner suggests that any age-appropriate skill can be taught. The steps are

1. Clearly specify the action or performance the student is to learn.
2. Break down the task into small achievable steps, going from simple to complex.
3. Let the student perform each step, reinforcing correct actions.
4. Adjust so that the student is always successful until finally the goal is reached.
5. Shift to intermittent reinforcement to maintain the student's performance.

== Contributions to social theory ==
Skinner is popularly known mainly for his books Walden Two (1948) and Beyond Freedom and Dignity, (for which he made the cover of Time magazine). The former describes a fictional "experimental community" in 1940s United States. The productivity and happiness of citizens in this community is far greater than in the outside world because the residents practice scientific social planning and use operant conditioning in raising their children.

Walden Two, like Thoreau's Walden, champions a lifestyle that does not support war, or foster competition and social strife. It encourages a lifestyle of minimal consumption, rich social relationships, personal happiness, satisfying work, and leisure. In 1967, Kat Kinkade and others founded the Twin Oaks Community, using Walden Two as a blueprint. The community still exists and continues to use the Planner-Manager system and other aspects of the community described in Skinner's book, though behavior modification is not a community practice.

In Beyond Freedom and Dignity, Skinner suggests that a technology of behavior could help to make a better society. We would, however, have to accept that an autonomous agent is not the driving force of our actions. Skinner offers alternatives to punishment, and challenges his readers to use science and modern technology to construct a better society.

== Political views ==
Skinner's political writings emphasized his hopes that an effective and human science of behavioral control – a technology of human behavior – could help with problems as yet unsolved and often aggravated by advances in technology such as the atomic bomb. Indeed, one of Skinner's goals was to prevent humanity from destroying itself. He saw political activity as the use of aversive or non-aversive means to control a population. Skinner favored the use of positive reinforcement as a means of control, citing Jean-Jacques Rousseau's novel Emile: or, On Education as an example of literature that "did not fear the power of positive reinforcement."

Skinner's book, Walden Two, presents a vision of a decentralized, localized society, which applies a practical, scientific approach and behavioral expertise to deal peacefully with social problems. (For example, his views led him to oppose corporal punishment in schools, and he wrote a letter to the California Senate that helped lead it to a ban on spanking.) Skinner's utopia is both a thought experiment and a rhetorical piece. In Walden Two, Skinner answers the problem that exists in many utopian novels – "What is the Good Life?" The book's answer is a life of friendship, health, art, a healthy balance between work and leisure, a minimum of unpleasantness, and a feeling that one has made worthwhile contributions to a society in which resources are ensured, in part, by minimizing consumption.

If the world is to save any part of its resources for the future, it must reduce not only consumption but the number of consumers.

— B. F. Skinner, Walden Two (1948), p. xi

Skinner described his novel as "my New Atlantis", in reference to Bacon's utopia.

When Milton's Satan falls from heaven, he ends in hell. And what does he say to reassure himself? 'Here, at least, we shall be free.' And that, I think, is the fate of the old-fashioned liberal. He's going to be free, but he's going to find himself in hell.

— B. F. Skinner, from William F. Buckley Jr, On the Firing Line, p. 87.

== "'Superstition' in the Pigeon" experiment ==
One of Skinner's experiments examined the formation of superstition in one of his favorite experimental animals, the pigeon. Skinner placed a series of hungry pigeons in a cage attached to an automatic mechanism that delivered food to the pigeon "at regular intervals with no reference whatsoever to the bird's behavior." He discovered that the pigeons associated the delivery of the food with whatever chance actions they had been performing as it was delivered, and that they subsequently continued to perform these same actions.

One bird was conditioned to turn counter-clockwise about the cage, making two or three turns between reinforcements. Another repeatedly thrust its head into one of the upper corners of the cage. A third developed a 'tossing' response, as if placing its head beneath an invisible bar and lifting it repeatedly. Two birds developed a pendulum motion of the head and body, in which the head was extended forward and swung from right to left with a sharp movement followed by a somewhat slower return.

Skinner suggested that the pigeons behaved as if they were influencing the automatic mechanism with their "rituals", and that this experiment shed light on human behavior:

The experiment might be said to demonstrate a sort of superstition. The bird behaves as if there were a causal relation between its behavior and the presentation of food, although such a relation is lacking. There are many analogies in human behavior. Rituals for changing one's fortune at cards are good examples. A few accidental connections between a ritual and favorable consequences suffice to set up and maintain the behavior in spite of many unreinforced instances. The bowler who has released a ball down the alley but continues to behave as if she were controlling it by twisting and turning her arm and shoulder is another case in point. These behaviors have, of course, no real effect upon one's luck or upon a ball half way down an alley, just as in the present case the food would appear as often if the pigeon did nothing—or, more strictly speaking, did something else.

Modern behavioral psychologists have disputed Skinner's "superstition" explanation for the behaviors he recorded. Subsequent research (e.g. Staddon and Simmelhag, 1971), while finding similar behavior, failed to find support for Skinner's "adventitious reinforcement" explanation for it. By looking at the timing of different behaviors within the interval, Staddon and Simmelhag were able to distinguish two classes of behavior: the terminal response, which occurred in anticipation of food, and interim responses, that occurred earlier in the interfood interval and were rarely contiguous with food. Terminal responses seem to reflect classical (as opposed to operant) conditioning, rather than adventitious reinforcement, guided by a process like that observed in 1968 by Brown and Jenkins in their "autoshaping" procedures. The causation of interim activities (such as the schedule-induced polydipsia seen in a similar situation with rats) also cannot be traced to adventitious reinforcement and its details are still obscure (Staddon, 1977).

== Criticism ==
=== Noam Chomsky ===
American linguist Noam Chomsky published a review of Skinner's Verbal Behavior in the linguistics journal Language in 1959. Chomsky argued that Skinner's attempt to use behaviorism to explain human language amounted to little more than word games. Conditioned responses could not account for a child's ability to create or understand an infinite variety of novel sentences. Chomsky's review has been credited with launching the cognitive revolution in psychology and other disciplines. Skinner, who rarely responded directly to critics, never formally replied to Chomsky's critique, but endorsed Kenneth MacCorquodale's 1972 reply.

I read half a dozen pages, saw that it missed the point of my book, and went no further. [...] My reasons, I am afraid, show a lack of character. In the first place I should have had to read the review, and I found its tone distasteful. It was not really a review of my book but of what Chomsky took, erroneously, to be my position.

Many academics in the 1960s believed that Skinner's silence on the question meant Chomsky's criticism had been justified. But MacCorquodale wrote that Chomsky's criticism did not focus on Skinner's Verbal Behavior, but rather attacked a confusion of ideas from behavioral psychology. MacCorquodale also regretted Chomsky's aggressive tone. Furthermore, Chomsky had aimed at delivering a definitive refutation of Skinner by citing dozens of animal instinct and animal learning studies. On the one hand, he argued that the studies on animal instinct proved that animal behavior is innate, and therefore Skinner was mistaken. On the other, Chomsky's opinion of the studies on learning was that one cannot draw an analogy from animal studies to human behavior—or, that research on animal instinct refutes research on animal learning.

Chomsky also reviewed Skinner's Beyond Freedom and Dignity, using the same basic motives as his Verbal Behavior review. Among Chomsky's criticisms were that Skinner's laboratory work could not be extended to humans, that when it was extended to humans it represented "scientistic" behavior attempting to emulate science but which was not scientific, that Skinner was not a scientist because he rejected the hypothetico-deductive model of theory testing, and that Skinner had no science of behavior.

=== Psychodynamic psychology ===
Skinner has been repeatedly criticized for his supposed animosity towards Sigmund Freud, psychoanalysis, and psychodynamic psychology. Some have argued, however, that Skinner shared several of Freud's assumptions, and that he was influenced by Freudian points of view in more than one field, among them the analysis of defense mechanisms, such as repression. To study such phenomena, Skinner even designed his own projective test, the "verbal summator" described above.

=== Temple Grandin ===
In her 2005 book, Animals in Translation, animal behaviorist Temple Grandin claimed that Skinner attempted to touch her legs without consent during a meeting and that she verbally rebuffed him. She recalled that she was approximately 18 years old at the time. She repeated this allegation in a 2006 interview with NPR and a 2018 interview with the Center for Autism and Related Disorders (although she stated in the 2006 interview that Skinner touched her prior to being rebuffed and in the 2018 interview that he asked if he could touch her prior to being rebuffed). In the 2018 interview, Grandin further stated, "I talked to somebody just recently about it that worked with B. F. Skinner years ago, and they said, 'Oh, yeah, that's B. F.; that's the kind of stuff he did.'" In the book and both interviews, Grandin also claimed Skinner was dismissive of her suggestion that a better understanding of how the brain functions would lead to a better understanding of behavior, but that he reversed this position following a stroke later in life.

== Professional career ==
=== Roles ===
- 1936–1937 Instructor, University of Minnesota
- 1937–1939 Assistant Professor, University of Minnesota
- 1939–1945 Associate Professor, University of Minnesota
- 1945–1948 Professor and chair, Indiana University
- 1947–1948 William James Lecturer, Harvard University
- 1948–1958 Professor, Harvard University
- 1958–1974 Professor of Psychology, Harvard University
- 1949–1950 President, Midwestern Psychological Association
- 1954–1955 President, Eastern Psychological Association
- 1966–1967 President, Pavlovian Society of North America
- 1974–1990 Professor of Psychology and Social Relations Emeritus, Harvard University

=== Awards ===
- 1926 AB, Hamilton College
- 1930 MA, Harvard University
- 1930–1931 Thayer Fellowship
- 1931 PhD, Harvard University
- 1931–1932 Walker Fellowship
- 1931–1933 National Research Council Fellowship
- 1933–1936 Junior Fellowship, Harvard Society of Fellows
- 1942 Guggenheim Fellowship (postponed until 1944–1945)
- 1942 Howard Crosby Warren Medal, Society of Experimental Psychologists
- 1958 Distinguished Scientific Contribution Award, American Psychological Association
- 1958–1974 Edgar Pierce Professor of Psychology, Harvard University
- 1964–1974 Career Award, National Institute of Mental Health
- 1966 Edward Lee Thorndike Award, American Psychological Association
- 1968 National Medal of Science, National Science Foundation
- 1969 Overseas Fellow in Churchill College, Cambridge
- 1971 Gold Medal Award, American Psychological Foundation
- 1971 Joseph P. Kennedy Jr., Foundation for Mental Retardation International award
- 1972 Humanist of the Year, American Humanist Association
- 1972 Creative Leadership in Education Award, New York University
- 1972 Career Contribution Award, Massachusetts Psychological Association
- 1978 Distinguished Contributions to Educational Research Award and Development, American Educational Research Association
- 1978 National Association for Retarded Citizens Award
- 1985 Award for Excellence in Psychiatry, Albert Einstein School of Medicine
- 1985 President's Award, New York Academy of Science
- 1990 William James Fellow Award, American Psychological Society
- 1990 Lifetime Achievement Award, American Psychological Association
- 1991 Outstanding Member and Distinguished Professional Achievement Award, Society for Performance Improvement
- 1997 Scholar Hall of Fame Award, Academy of Resource and Development
- 2011 Committee for Skeptical Inquiry Pantheon of Skeptics—Inducted
- 2024 Ig Nobel Peace Prize for experiments to see the feasibility of housing live pigeons inside missiles to guide the flight paths of the missiles.

=== Honorary degrees ===
Skinner received honorary degrees from:

- Alfred University
- Ball State University
- Colby College
- Dickinson College
- Hamilton College
- Harvard University
- Hobart and William Smith Colleges
- Johns Hopkins University
- Keio University
- Long Island University C. W. Post Campus
- McGill University
- North Carolina State University
- Ohio Wesleyan University
- Ripon College
- Rockford College
- Tufts University
- University of Chicago
- University of Exeter
- University of Missouri
- University of North Texas
- Western Michigan University
- University of Maryland, Baltimore County.

=== Honorary societies ===
Skinner was inducted to the following honorary societies:

- PSI CHI International Honor Society in Psychology
- American Philosophical Society
- American Academy of Arts and Sciences
- United States National Academy of Sciences

== Publications ==
- 1938. The Behavior of Organisms: An Experimental Analysis, 1938. ISBN 1-58390-007-1, ISBN 0-87411-487-X.
- 1948. Walden Two. ISBN 0-87220-779-X (revised 1976 ed.).
- 1953. Science and Human Behavior. ISBN 0-02-929040-6. (Note: A free copy of this book (in a 1.6 MB .pdf file) may be downloaded at the B. F. Skinner Foundation web site BFSkinner.org.)
- 1957. Schedules of Reinforcement, with C. B. Ferster. ISBN 0-13-792309-0.
- 1957. Verbal Behavior. ISBN 1-58390-021-7.
- 1961. The Analysis of Behavior: A Program for Self Instruction, with James G. Holland. ISBN 0-07-029565-4.
- 1968.The Technology of Teaching. New York: Appleton-Century-Crofts. LCCN 68--12340 ISBN 0-13-902163-9.
- 1969. Contingencies of Reinforcement: A Theoretical Analysis. ISBN 0-390-81280-3.
- 1971. Beyond Freedom and Dignity. ISBN 0-394-42555-3.
- 1974. About Behaviorism. ISBN 0-394-71618-3.
- 1976. Particulars of My Life: Part One of an Autobiography. ISBN 0-394-40071-2.
- 1978. Reflections on Behaviorism and Society. ISBN 0-13-770057-1.
- 1979. The Shaping of a Behaviorist: Part Two of an Autobiography. ISBN 0-394-50581-6.
- 1980. Notebooks, edited by Robert Epstein. ISBN 0-13-624106-9.
- 1982. Skinner for the Classroom, edited by R. Epstein. ISBN 0-87822-261-8.
- 1983. Enjoy Old Age: A Program of Self-Management, with M. E. Vaughan. ISBN 0-393-01805-9.
- 1983. A Matter of Consequences: Part Three of an Autobiography. ISBN 0-394-53226-0, ISBN 0-8147-7845-3.
- 1987. Upon Further Reflection. ISBN 0-13-938986-5.
- 1989. Recent Issues in the Analysis of Behavior. ISBN 0-675-20674-X.
- Cumulative Record: A Selection of Papers, 1959, 1961, 1972 and 1999 as Cumulative Record: Definitive Edition. ISBN 0-87411-969-3 (paperback)
  - Includes reprint: Skinner, B. F. 1945. "Baby in a Box." Ladies' Home Journal. — Skinner's original, personal account of the much-misrepresented "Baby in a box" device.

== See also ==
- Applied behavior analysis
- Back to Freedom and Dignity
