= Clean Air Car Race =

1970 environmental awareness event

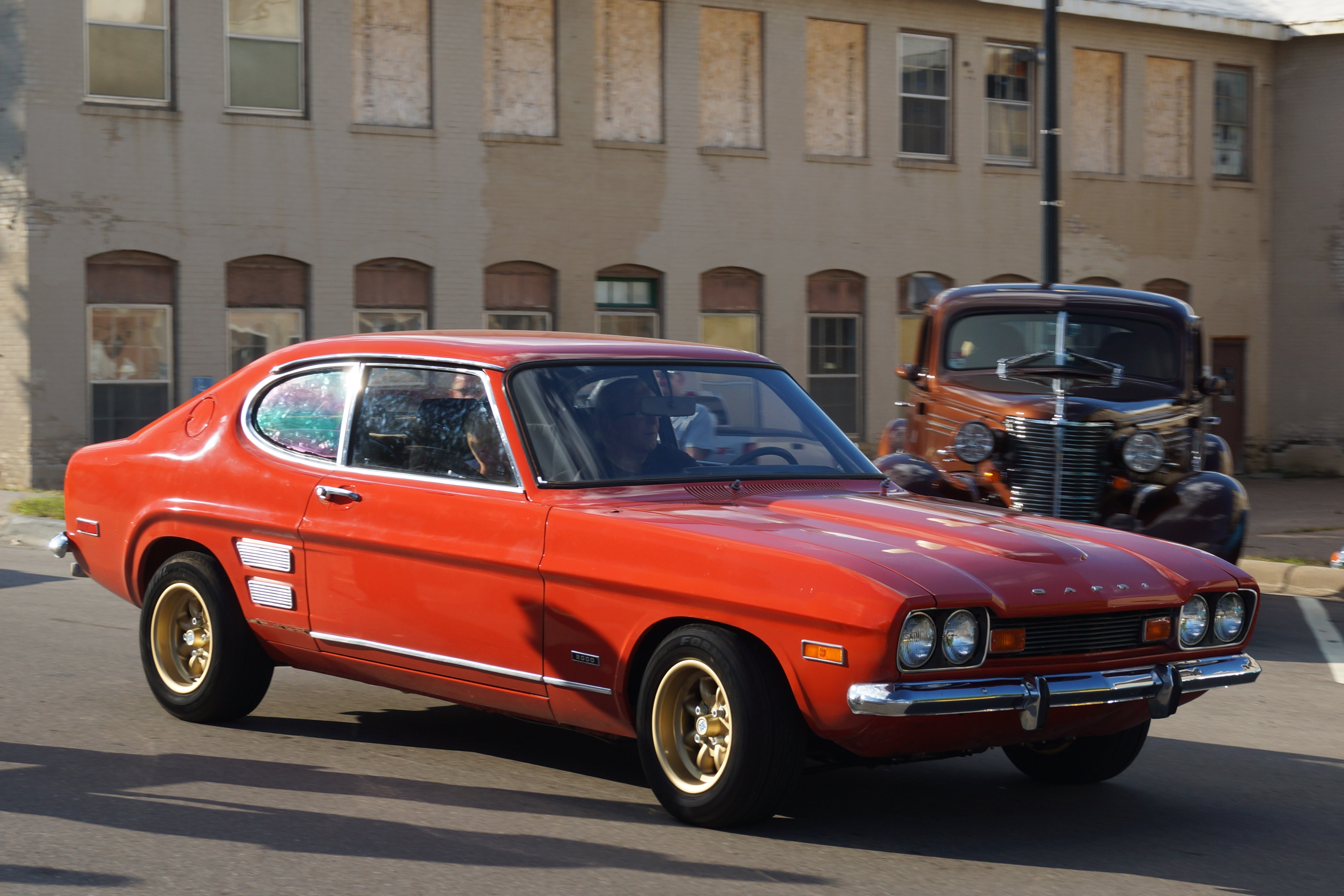
A Mercury Capri, winning car of the Clean Air Car Race

The 1970 Clean Air Car Race was designed to demonstrate the feasibility of lower-emission cars before the Clean Air Act emissions standards came into force in 1975. It took place against a background of increasing environmental awareness in the United States. This was the era in which the first Earth Day was celebrated, the Environmental Protection Agency (EPA) was established, and the Clean Air Act was signed into law by President Richard Nixon.

== History ==
In 1970, the United States Congress passed the Clean Air Act, which required a 90% reduction in carbon monoxide, hydrocarbon and nitrogen oxide emissions by the 1975 model year. Initially, the automotive industry resisted these limits, believing that such improvements could not be achieved in such a short time.

In response, students at the California Institute of Technology (Caltech) and the Massachusetts Institute of Technology (MIT) began competing to build vehicles that would meet the 1975 emissions standards by 1970. At the same time, the vehicles had to meet certain practical performance criteria. For instance, the vehicles had to be capable of carrying two adults, reaching a speed of at least 45 miles per hour (72.5 kilometres per hour), and having low fuel consumption and emissions.

A similar race had already taken place in 1968 in the form of the Great Transcontinental Electric Car Race, but this time more universities took part. By contrast, over 40 university teams took part in the new race, registering a wide range of vehicles powered by various technologies, including batteries, steam, gas turbines, hybrid drives and combustion engines fueled by gasoline, propane or methanol.

== Race ==
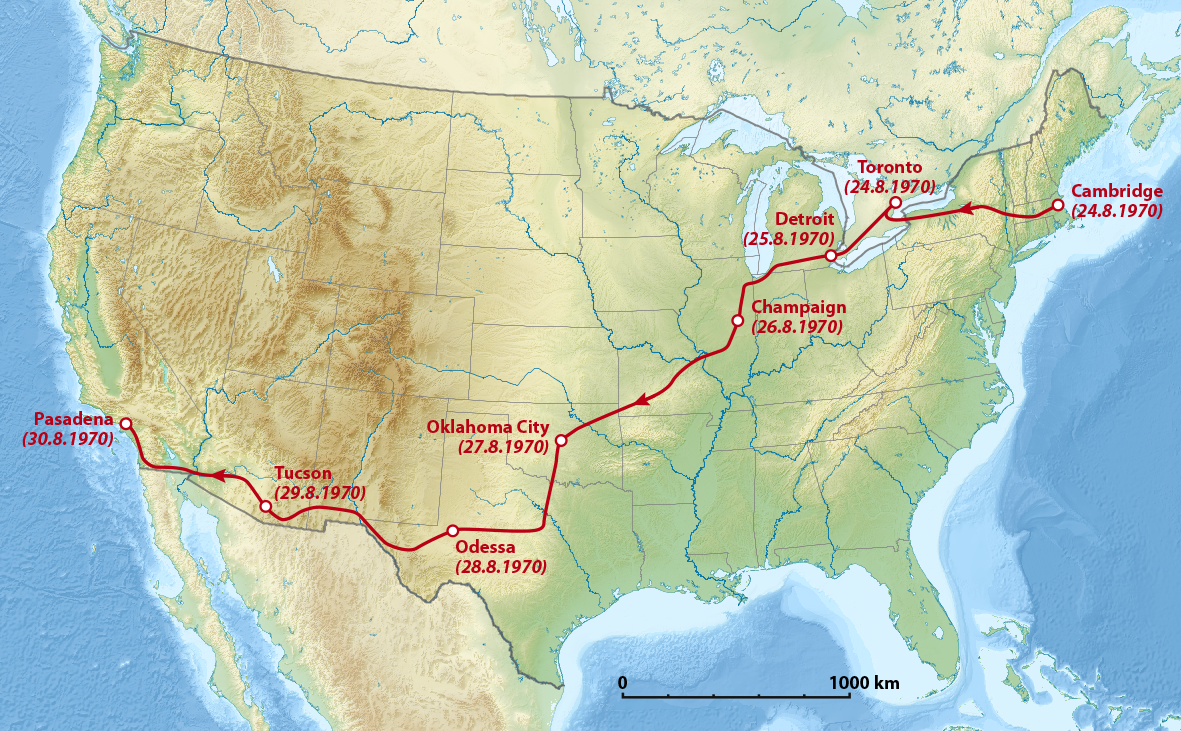
Route of the Clean Air Car Race from Cambridge to Pasadena

The race began on 24 August 1970 at the Massachusetts Institute of Technology in Cambridge, Massachusetts and ended six days later at the California Institute of Technology in Pasadena, California. The route covered approximately 5,800 kilometres through eleven U.S. states and the Canadian province of Ontario. Several emissions tests were carried out along the route, including at the start in Cambridge, in Pasadena and in Detroit at the automobile manufacturers' test facilities.

The winning car was a modified Mercury Capri developed by a team of Ford engineers and students from Wayne State University, in collaboration with catalytic converter manufacturer Engelhard. The vehicle was powered by a gasoline engine that ran on unleaded gasoline, a fuel which was barely available at the time. It was also equipped with an exhaust gas recirculation system to reduce nitrogen oxides. Additionally, the vehicle had two PTX-5 catalytic converter sets from Engelhard installed below a manifold. These were installed below a manifold each. To ensure the complete oxidation of hydrocarbons and carbon monoxide, additional air was introduced upstream of the second catalytic converter set. The twin pipes were then merged and connected to a conventional muffler. The air–fuel ratio was stabilized as much as possible through carburetor air and fuel temperature control. It was between 14.5:1 and 15:1, which was slightly on the lean side. The air temperature was regulated using a temperature-dependent valve to mix high- and low-temperature intake air. The fuel lines were insulated, and the carburetor was shielded from engine heat. This precise control of the air–fuel ratio enabled the catalytic converters to operate at maximum efficiency. To reduce fuel consumption, the team replaced the bonnet, boot lid and doors with lightweight materials. The windows were kept closed while driving and the air conditioning was not used in order to optimize fuel efficiency.

Before the race, the vehicle underwent rigorous testing at the EPA in Ann Arbor, Michigan to ensure it was ready for the demanding journey and met emissions standards. While the rest of the team provided logistical support, Ford engineers took turns at the wheel of the vehicle. For example, an escort vehicle carrying 760 litres of unleaded gasoline supplied the vehicle with fuel.

The car met all of the race's performance standards, including acceleration, average speed and exhaust emissions, without incurring any penalty points. It was one of only 15 vehicles to complete the entire course, demonstrating the reliability and efficiency of the technology.

== Consequences ==
The Clean Air Car Race attracted nationwide attention. Shortly before the Senate debate on limits, the race results were announced. With emissions of 0.19 grams of hydrocarbons and 1.48 grams of carbon monoxide per mile driven, the Mercury Capri met the limits set out in the Senate bill of 0.5 grams of hydrocarbons and 11.0 grams of carbon monoxide. The reduction in nitrogen oxides was just above the limit. If a modified car from Wayne University could meet or almost meet the required limits, then the major car manufacturers should also be able to do so. This helped to accelerate the introduction of catalytic converters, unleaded petrol and exhaust gas recirculation systems.
