= Beyond Freedom and Dignity =

1971 book by B.F. Skinner

- Author: B. F. Skinner
- Publication date: 1971

Beyond Freedom and Dignity is a 1971 book by American psychologist B. F. Skinner. Skinner argues that entrenched belief in free will and the moral autonomy of the individual (which Skinner referred to as "dignity") hinders the prospect of using scientific methods to modify behavior for the purpose of building a happier and better-organized society.

Beyond Freedom and Dignity may be summarized as an attempt to promote Skinner's philosophy of science, the technology of human behavior, his conception of determinism, and what Skinner calls "cultural engineering".

== Synopsis ==
The book is organized into nine chapters.

=== A Technology of Behavior ===
In this chapter Skinner proposes that a technology of behavior is possible and that it can be used to help solve currently pressing human issues such as over-population and warfare. "Almost all major problems involve human behavior, and they cannot be solved by physical and biological technology alone. What is needed is a technology of human behavior."

=== Freedom ===
In this chapter Skinner offers a more precise definition of freedom, one that allows for his conception of determinism, and speaks to the conventional notion of freedom. Skinner argues against "autonomous man".

Skinner notes that the forces of Freedom and Dignity have led to many positive advances in the human condition, but may now be hindering the advance of a technology of human behavior: "[the literature of freedom and dignity] has been successful in reducing the aversive stimuli used in intentional control, but it has made the mistake of defining freedom in terms of states of mind or feelings..."

=== Dignity ===
Dignity is the process by which people are given credit for their actions, or alternatively punished for them under the notion of responsibility. Skinner's analysis rejects both as "dignity" – a false notion of inner causality which removes both credit for action and blame for misdeeds, "the achievements for which a person himself is to be given credit seem to approach zero.".

Skinner notes that credit is typically a function of the conspicuousness of control. We give less or no credit, or blame, to those who are overtly coached, compelled, prompted or otherwise not appearing to be producing actions spontaneously.

=== Punishment ===
Skinner saw punishment as the logical consequence of an unscientific analysis of behavior as well as the tradition of "freedom and dignity". Since individuals are seen to be making choices they are then able to be punished for those choices. Since Skinner denies the existence of free will, he therefore argued against punishment which he saw to be ineffective in controlling behavior.

=== Alternatives to Punishment ===
Skinner notes that the previous solutions to punishment are often not very useful and may create additional problems. Permissiveness, the metaphor of mid-wifery (or maieutics, ie the Socratic Method), "guidance", a dependence on things, "changing minds", all contain either problems or faulty assumptions about what is going on.

Skinner argues that this misunderstanding of control championed by the defenders of freedom and dignity "encourage[s] the misuse of controlling practices and block progress towards a more effective technology of behavior."

=== Values ===
Skinner notes a 'prescientific' view of man allows for personal achievement. The 'scientific view' moves human action to be explained by species evolution and environmental history.

Skinner speaks to feelings about what is right, as well as popular notions of "good". Skinner translates popular words and phrases around value issues into his view of contingencies of reinforcement. Skinner notes that even if the technology of behavior produces "goods" to improve human life, they expose environmental control, which is offensive to the "freedom and dignity" perspective.

=== The Evolution of a Culture ===
Skinner suggests that cultural evolution is a way to describe the aggregate of (operant) behavior. A culture is a collection of behavior, or practices. Skinner addresses "social Darwinism" and argues that as a justification of the subordination of other nations or of war competition with others is a small part of natural selection. A much more important part is competition with the physical environment itself. Skinner relates the idea of cultural evolution back to the question of values: whose values are to survive?

=== The Design of a Culture ===
Skinner notes that cultural design is not new, but is already existing and on-going. Skinner notes that most discussions of current problems are dominated by metaphors, concerns for feelings and states of mind which do not illuminate possible solutions. Skinner notes that behavior modification is ethically neutral.

Skinner notes that Utopian speculations, like his novel Walden Two, are a kind of cultural engineering. He then devotes much of the rest of this chapter to addressing the criticisms and complaints against cultural engineering.

=== What is Man? ===
Skinner again addresses the notion of the individual, and discusses how aspects of a person's character could be assigned to environmental factors. He also covers cognition, problem solving, self-control and counters some arguments or possible misconceptions. Skinner notes that his analysis does not "leave an empty organism". Skinner addresses the issue of mechanical models of human action, which are better addressed elsewhere. Skinner notes that, "The evolution of a culture is a gigantic effort in self-control." and ends with, "A scientific view of man offers exciting possibilities. We have not yet seen what man can make of man."

== Walden Two ==
Beyond Freedom and Dignity is consistent with Walden Two, a 1948 novel by Skinner, depicting a utopian community based on his ideas regarding behavior modification. In Beyond Freedom and Dignity Skinner extends his argument for explicit cultural engineering of which Walden Two may be seen as an example.

== Reactions ==
Linguist Noam Chomsky criticized Skinner's methods and conclusions. His 1971 essay "The Case Against B.F. Skinner" responded to Beyond Freedom and Dignity, arguing against behaviorism and its claim to scientific status. In response to Skinner's denial of human dignity, Chomsky said, "It would be absurd to conclude merely from the fact that freedom is limited, that “autonomous man” is an illusion (...) It would be hard to conceive of a more striking failure to comprehend even the rudiments of scientific thinking ".

John Staddon criticized Skinner's contention that punishment is ineffective and free-will an unnecessary concept, arguing that "Punishment doesn't always abolish freedom -- and freedom is not just absence of punishment".

== See also ==
- Verbal Behavior
- Applied behavior analysis
