= Philadelphia La Scala Opera Company =

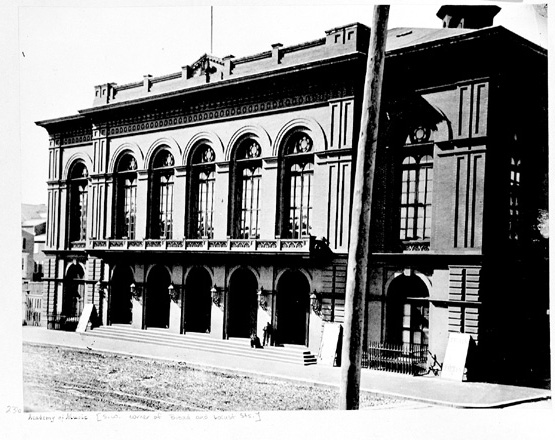
The Academy of Music in Philadelphia.

The Philadelphia La Scala Opera Company (defunct) was an American opera company located in Philadelphia, Pennsylvania that was actively performing at the Academy of Music between 1925 and 1954. In 1955 the company merged with the Philadelphia Civic Grand Opera Company to form the Philadelphia Grand Opera Company.

== History ==
Founded under the name La Scala Grand Opera Company, the company's first production was of Giuseppe Verdi's La traviata on May 4, 1925 with Josephine Lucchese as Violetta, Dimitri Onofrei as Alfredo, Elia Palma as Giorgio, and Fulgenzio Guerrieri conducting. The company presented fifteen more operas during the 1925-1926 season including Gaetano Donizetti's Lucia di Lammermoor (with Rosalinda Rudko-Morini in the title role, Giuseppe Reschiglian as Edgardo, and Emanuel Nugnez as Enrico), Giuseppe Verdi's Aida (with Alice Eversman in the title role and Bernardo de Muro as Radames), Verdi's Rigoletto, Cavalleria rusticana (with Emilia Vergeri as Santuzza), and Pagliacci (with Nicola Zerola as Canio) among others.

After its first season, Francesco Pelosi was appointed General Manager and Artistic Director of the company in 1926. For the second season the company was renamed the Philadelphia La Scala Grand Opera Company which it performed under until 1938 when the company's title was shortened to the Philadelphia La Scala Opera Company. Pelosi served as director until his sudden death in a car accident in 1948. He was succeeded by Humbert A. Pelosi who served the company as General Manager and Artistic Director for the rest of its history. Carlo Moresco was the company's primary conductor from 1950-1954.

During its history, the PLOC typically presented 12 operas each year at the Academy of Music during its annual season, giving over 350 opera performances at the house by the end of its final season. The company's last season was the 1953-1954 which was cut short due to financial reasons. The company's last performance was of Georges Bizet's Carmen on April 29, 1954 with Gloria Lane in the title role, David Poleri as Don José, Rutilio del Vecchio as Escamillo, Dora Marasco as Micaëla, and Moresco conducting. In November 1954 the company merged with the Philadelphia Civic Grand Opera Company to form the Philadelphia Grand Opera Company.

== Notable performers ==
- Adele Addison
- Licia Albanese
- John Alexander
- Stefano Ballarini
- Gino Bechi
- Carlo Bergonzi
- Elisabeth Carron
- Walter Cassel
- Mary Costa
- Mary Curtis Verna
- Mario del Monaco
- Giuseppe Di Stefano
- Lucia Evangelista
- Edith Evans
- Giulio Gari
- Joann Grillo
- Frank Guarrera
- Andréa Guiot
- Thomas Hayward
- Laurel Hurley
- Herva Nelli
- Norman Kelley
- Flaviano Labò
- Albert Lance
- Bruno Landi
- Brenda Lewis
- Eva Likova
- Thomas Lo Monaco
- Chester Ludgin
- Jean Madeira
- Elaine Malbin
- Andrew McKinley
- Michael Minsky
- Licinio Montefusco
- Nicolai Moscona
- Birgit Nilsson
- Gino Penno
- Roberta Peters
- Irra Petina
- Rudolf Petrak
- Claudia Pinza Bozzolla
- Giacinto Prandelli
- Louis Quilico
- Nell Rankin
- Hilde Reggiani
- Regina Resnik
- Graciela Rivera
- Stella Roman
- Elinor Ross
- Norman Scott
- Louis Sgarro
- Eleanor Steber
- Teresa Stratas
- Brian Sullivan
- Ferruccio Tagliavini
- Pia Tassinari
- Richard Torigi
- Norman Treigle
- Richard Tucker
- Claramae Turner
- Jon Vickers
- Ramón Vinay
- Sandra Warfield
- Robert Weede
- Frances Yeend
- Josephine Zumpano
