= Il trovatore discography =

This is a partial discography of Giuseppe Verdi's opera Il trovatore (The Troubadour) and Le trouvère (the revised version in French translation). At least 83 recordings exist of the opera as a whole, made between 1912 and 2011, although not all of them are absolutely complete. Of these, 45 are live audio recordings, 22 are studio audio recordings, and 16 are videos or movies. Il trovatore was first performed at the Teatro Apollo, Rome on 19 January 1853. Le trouvère was first presented on 12 January 1857.

== Audio recordings ==
Year	Cast (Manrico, Leonora, Azucena, Di Luna, Ferrando)	Conductor, Opera house and orchestra	Label
1930	Aureliano Pertile, Maria Carena, Irene Minghini-Cattaneo, Apollo Granforte, Bruno Carmassi	Carlo Sabajno; Teatro alla Scala orchestra and chorus	CD: Aura Music; Cat: LRC 11104-2
1930	Francesco Merli, Bianca Scacciati, Giuseppina Zinetti, Enrico Molinari, Corrado Zambelli	Lorenzo Molajoli; Teatro alla Scala orchestra and chorus	CD: Naxos; Cat: 8.110162-63
1951	Giacomo Lauri-Volpi, Maria Callas, Cloe Elmo, Paolo Silveri, Italo Tajo	Tullio Serafin; Teatro di San Carlo orchestra and chorus	CD: Mondo Musica; Cat: MMO 91117
1952	Jussi Björling, Zinka Milanov, Fedora Barbieri, Leonard Warren, Nicola Moscona	Renato Cellini; RCA Victor Orchestra; Robert Shaw Chorale	LP: RCA Victrola AVM2-0699; CD: RCA Victor; Cat: 6643-2-RG
1953	Gino Penno, Maria Callas, Ebe Stignani, Carlo Tagliabue, Giuseppe Modesti	Antonino Votto; Teatro alla Scala orchestra and chorus	CD: Urania; Cat: B000CS24UO
1956	Mario Del Monaco, Renata Tebaldi, Giulietta Simionato, Ugo Savarese, Giorgio Tozzi	Alberto Erede; Grand Théâtre de Genève orchestra Maggio Musicale Fiorentino chorus	CD: Decca; Cat: 411 874-2 & 470 589-2
1956	Giuseppe Di Stefano, Maria Callas, Fedora Barbieri, Rolando Panerai, Nicola Zaccaria	Herbert von Karajan; Teatro alla Scala orchestra and chorus	CD: EMI Classics; Cat: 56333 & 77365
1957	Kurt Baum, Mary Curtis-Verna, Rosalind Elias, Frank Guarrera, Norman Scott	Max Rudolf; Metropolitan Opera orchestra and chorus	LP: Book of the Month Club; Cat: MO 726
1959	Richard Tucker, Leontyne Price, Rosalind Elias, Leonard Warren, Giorgio Tozzi	Arturo Basile; Rome Opera orchestra and chorus	CD: RCA Victor; Cat: 60560-2-RG
1962	Franco Corelli, Leontyne Price, Giulietta Simionato, Ettore Bastianini, Nicola Zaccaria	Herbert von Karajan; Vienna Philharmonic; Vienna State Opera chorus (Live recording during Salzburg Festival, 31 July 1962)	CD: Deutsche Grammophon; Cat: 447659
1963	Carlo Bergonzi, Antonietta Stella, Fiorenza Cossotto, Ettore Bastianini, Ivo Vinco	Tullio Serafin; Teatro alla Scala orchestra and chorus	CD: Deutsche Grammophon; Cat: 768402
1964	Franco Corelli, Gabriella Tucci, Giulietta Simionato, Robert Merrill, Ferruccio Mazzoli	Thomas Schippers; Rome Opera orchestra and chorus	CD: EMI Classics; Cat: 763640 2
1964	Carlo Bergonzi, Gabriella Tucci, Giulietta Simionato, Piero Cappuccilli, Ivo Vinco	Gianandrea Gavazzeni; Teatro alla Scala orchestra and chorus (Live recording during tour in Moscow, September 1964)	CD: Opera d'Oro; Cat: 7045
1964	Bruno Prevedi, Gwyneth Jones, Giulietta Simionato, Peter Glossop, Joseph Rouleau	Carlo Maria Giulini; Royal Opera House orchestra and chorus	CD: Royal Opera House; Cat: ROHS011
1969	Plácido Domingo, Leontyne Price, Fiorenza Cossotto, Sherrill Milnes, Bonaldo Giaiotti	Zubin Mehta; Philharmonia Orchestra; Ambrosian Singers	LP: RCA Red Seal; Cat: LSC-6194; CD: RCA Red Seal; Cat: 88883729262
1976	Luciano Pavarotti, Joan Sutherland, Marilyn Horne, Ingvar Wixell, Nicolai Ghiaurov	Richard Bonynge; National Philharmonic Orchestra; London Opera chorus	CD: Decca; Cat: 417137
1977	Franco Bonisolli, Leontyne Price, Elena Obraztsova, Piero Cappuccilli, Ruggero Raimondi	Herbert von Karajan; Berlin Philharmonic; Deutsche Oper Berlin chorus	CD: EMI Classics; Cat: 7 69311 2
1977	Carlo Cossutta, Gilda Cruz-Romo, Fiorenza Cossotto, Matteo Manuguerra, Agostino Ferrin	Riccardo Muti, Chorus and orchestra of Maggio Musicale Fiorentino	CD: Opera Depot
1978	Plácido Domingo, Raina Kabaivanska, Fiorenza Cossotto, Piero Cappuccilli, José van Dam	Herbert von Karajan; Vienna State Opera orchestra and chorus	CD: RCA Red Seal Records; Cat: 74321 61951-2
1980	José Carreras, Katia Ricciarelli, Stefania Toczyska, Yuri Mazurok, Robert Lloyd	Colin Davis; Royal Opera House orchestra and chorus	CD: Philips Classics; Cat: 446151
1984	Plácido Domingo, Rosalind Plowright, Brigitte Fassbaender, Giorgio Zancanaro, Yevgeny Nesterenko	Carlo Maria Giulini; Accademia Nazionale di Santa Cecilia orchestra and chorus	CD: Deutsche Grammophon; Cat: 423858
1990	Luciano Pavarotti, Antonella Banaudi, Shirley Verrett, Leo Nucci, Francesco Ellero d'Artegna	Zubin Mehta; Maggio Musicale Fiorentino orchestra and chorus (Live recording during the festival, 7 June 1990)	CD: Decca; Cat: 430694
1991	Plácido Domingo, Aprile Millo, Dolora Zajick, Vladimir Chernov, James Morris	James Levine; Metropolitan Opera orchestra and chorus	CD: Sony; Cat: 48070
1999	Boiko Zvetanov, Anda-Louise Bogza, Graciela Alperyn, Igor Morozov, Vladimir Kubovcik	Ivan Anguelov; Radio Symphony Orchestra Bratislava; National Opera Chorus	CD: Arte Nova Classics; Cat: 74321 721102
2000	Salvatore Licitra, Barbara Frittoli, Violeta Urmana, Leo Nucci, Giorgio Giuseppini	Riccardo Muti; Teatro alla Scala orchestra and chorus	CD: Sony; Cat: 89553
2001	Roberto Alagna, Angela Gheorghiu, Larissa Diadkova, Thomas Hampson, Ildebrando D'Arcangelo	Antonio Pappano; London Symphony Orchestra; London Voices	CD: EMI Classics; Cat: 57360
2001	Andrea Bocelli, Verónica Villarroel, Elena Zaremba, Carlo Guelfi, Carlo Colombara	Steven Mercurio; Teatro Massimo Bellini orchestra and chorus	CD: Decca, Cat: 475 366-2
2011	Herbert Lippert, Simone Kermes, Yvonne Naef, Miljenko Turk, Josef Wagner	Michael Hofstetter; Ludwigsburger Schlossfestspiele orchestra and chorus	CD: Oehms Classics; Cat: OC951

== Video recordings ==
Year	Cast (Manrico, Leonora, Azucena, Di Luna, Ferrando)	Conductor, Opera house and orchestra	Label
1957	Mario Del Monaco, Leyla Gencer, Fedora Barbieri, Ettore Bastianini, Plinio Clabassi	Fernando Previtali; RAI Milano orchestra and chorus	DVD: Hardy Classics Video; Cat: HCD 4006
1978	Plácido Domingo, Raina Kabaivanska, Fiorenza Cossotto, Piero Cappuccilli, José van Dam	Herbert von Karajan; Vienna Philharmonic; Vienna State Opera chorus	DVD: TDK; Cat: DV-CLOPIT
1983	Kenneth Collins, Joan Sutherland, Lauris Elms, Jonathan Summers, Donald Shanks	Richard Bonynge; Opera Australia Orchestra and chorus	DVD: Image Entertainment; Cat: ID 9310 RADVD
1985	Franco Bonisolli, Rosalind Plowright, Fiorenza Cossotto, Giorgio Zancanaro, Paolo Washington	Reynalde Giovaninetti; Arena di Verona and chorus	DVD: NVC Arts; Cat: 4509-99215-2
1988	Luciano Pavarotti, Éva Marton, Dolora Zajick, Sherrill Milnes, Jeffrey Wells	James Levine; Metropolitan Opera orchestra and chorus	DVD: Deutsche Grammophon; Cat: DG 073 002-9
2002	José Cura, Verónica Villarroel, Yvonne Naef, Dmitri Hvorostovsky, Tomas Tomasson	Carlo Rizzi; Royal Opera House orchestra and chorus (Stage director:Elijah Moshinsky)	DVD: Opus Arte; Cat:OAMO6010D
2010	Marcelo Álvarez, Teresa Romano, Mzia Nioradze, Claudio Sgura, Deyan Vatchkov	Yuri Temirkanov; Teatro Regio di Parma orchestra and chorus	DVD: C Major; Cat:723408
2011	Marcelo Álvarez, Sondra Radvanovsky, Dolora Zajick, Dmitri Hvorostovsky, Stefan Kocán	Marco Armiliato; Metropolitan Opera orchestra and chorus	DVD: Deutsche Grammophon; Cat: 800165549-09
2015	Yonghoon Lee, Anna Netrebko, Dolora Zajick, Dmitri Hvorostovsky, Stefan Kocán	Marco Armiliato; Metropolitan Opera orchestra and chorus	Met Opera on Demand
2020	Yusif Eyvazov, Anna Netrekbo, Dolora Zajick, Luca Salsi, Riccardo Fassi	Pier Giorgio Morandi; Orchestra and chorus of the Arena di Verona Festival; Franco Zeffirelli, stage director	DVD: C major Cat:754704

== Audio: Le trouvère (1857 French version) ==
Year	Cast (Manrique, Léonore, Azucena, Le Compte de Luna, Fernand)	Conductor, Opera house and orchestra	Label
1912	Charles Fontaine, Jane Morlet, Catherine Lapeyrette, Jean Noté, Robert Marvini	François Ruhlmann; Studio orchestra and chorus	LP: Pathé; Cat: 1603-1621; CD: Aura Music; Cat: LRC 1902
1962	Tony Poncet, Michèle Le Bris, Elise Kahn, Louis Quilico, Bernard Gontcharenko	Jean Fournet; Orchestre Lamoureux	LP: Philips; Cat: 837 469
1998	Warren Mok, Iano Tamar, Sylvie Brunet, Nikola Mijailović, Jae-Jun Lee	Marco Guidarini; Orchestra Internazionale d'Italia; Bratislava Chamber Chorus (Live recording during Festival della Valle d'Itria, August 1998)	CD: Dynamic; Cat: CDS 225/1-2

== Video: Le trouvère (1857 French version) ==
Year	Cast (Manrique, Léonore, Azucena, Le Compte de Luna, Fernand)	Conductor, Opera house and orchestra	Label
2019	Giuseppe Gipali, Roberta Mantegna, Nino Surguladze, Franco Vassallo, Marco Spotti	Roberto Abbado, Teatro Comunale di Bologna orchestra and chorus, Robert Wilson, stage director	DVD:Dynamic; Cat:CDS7835
