= Philadelphia Grand Opera Company =

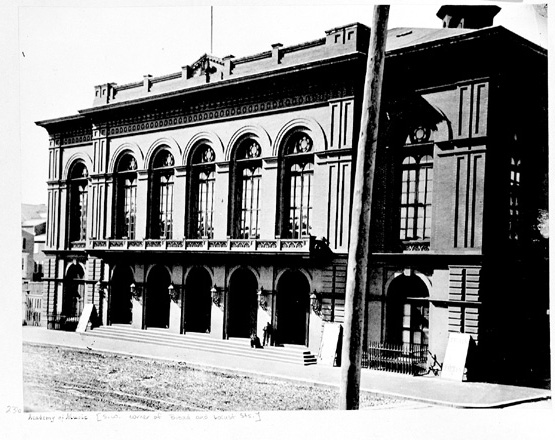
The Academy of Music in Philadelphia

The Philadelphia Grand Opera Company was the name of four different American opera companies active at the Academy of Music in Philadelphia, Pennsylvania, during the 20th century. The last and best known of the four was founded in November 1954 with the merger of the Philadelphia Civic Grand Opera Company and the Philadelphia La Scala Opera Company. That company in turn merged with the Philadelphia Lyric Opera Company in 1975 to form the Opera Company of Philadelphia. Of the three earlier companies, only one lasted beyond one season; a company founded in 1926 which later became associated with the Curtis Institute of Music in 1929. That company closed its doors in 1932 due to financial reasons during the Great Depression.

== History ==
=== The first Philadelphia Grand Opera Companies: 1916 ===
The first company to be known as the Philadelphia Grand Opera Company (PGOC) was founded in 1916. Its first production, Gaetano Donizetti's Lucia di Lammermoor, opened on December 18 of that year at the Academy of Music with Regina Vicarino in the title role, Forrest Lamont as Edgardo, and Ettore Martini conducting. Short lived, the company produced one more opera in December 1916, Giuseppe Verdi's Il trovatore, before disbanding.

=== Salmaggi's Philadelphia Grand Opera Companies: 1920-1921 ===
The second company to be known as the PGOC was actually a company based out of New York City that was active in both NYC and Philadelphia. The company was founded by impresario Alfred Salmaggi (later founder of the Salmaggi Opera Company) in the spring of 1920 under the name the Italian Lyric Federation. The company's first performance at the Academy of Music was Verdi's Otello on June 30, 1920, with Nicola Zerola in the title role. The company changed its name to the PGOC in November 1920 after the financial backers fired Salmaggi. From this point on the company worked out of Philadelphia, although Salmaggi countered his firing by continuing to perform works with different singers under the name of the Italian Lyric Federation in NYC. Like the first PGOC, this company was also short lived, with its last production, Rigoletto, being held on Halloween of 1921.

=== The Hammer's Philadelphia Grand Opera Companies: 1926-1932 ===
The third PGOC was founded in 1926 by Helen Redington Carter, socialite wife of well known Philadelphia neurologist Joseph Leidy, William Carl Hammer, an importer and trumpeter, and his wife, Kathryn O'Gorman Hammer. Both of the Hammers ran the business side of the company, with William running the Box Office and Kathryn hiring artists, putting together sets and costumes, and sometimes directing productions. Kathryn was a bandmaster and trombonist and she was notably the world's only female opera director at that time. Mrs. Leidy served as the opera board's president and provided a considerable amount of financial backing to get the company started. She also was able to get the opera house filled, being influential among Philadelphia's high society of the day.

During the company's first year, the Hammers announced six performances for the first season. The company's first performance at the Academy of Music was a production of Verdi's Aida on October 28, 1926, with Vera Curtis in the title role, Jerome Uhl as the King of Egypt, John Sample as Radames, and Marta Wittkowska as Amneris. Other operas that season included Rigoletto with Millo Picco in the title role and Josephine Lucchese as Gilda, Charles Gounod's Faust with Charles Hart in the title role and Irene Williams as Marguerite, Ruggero Leoncavallo's Pagliacci with Robert Steel as Tonio and Euphemia Giannini Gregory as Nedda, Otello with Sample in the title role and Chief Caupolican as Iago, and Carmen with Wittkowska in the title role and Armand Tokatyan as Don José.

During the company's first three seasons the company was struggling to get by. Kathryn was able to save the company a lot of money by making the company's costumes from cheesecloth on her home sewing-machine and begging and borrowing sets and properties at bargain prices. Largely due to her shrewd efforts the company managed to stay in the black. The company opened its second season on October 20, 1927, with Amilcare Ponchielli's La Gioconda, starring Clara Jacobo in the title role, Mignon Sutorius as Laura, Ivan Steschenko as Alvise Badoero, and Berta Levina as La cieca. Conductor Artur Rodziński joined the company that year and remained one of the PGOC's major conductors through 1929. Highlights of that second season included productions of Giacomo Puccini's Tosca with Martha Attwood in the title role and Pietro Mascagni's Cavalleria rusticana with Lisa Roma as Santuzza. Highlights of the 1928–1929 season included Franco Leoni's L’oracolo with Ivan Steschenko as Uin-Sci and Adamo Didur as Cim-Fen, Camille Saint-Saëns's Samson et Dalila with Sample as Samson and Madame Cahier as Dalila, Jules Massenet's Manon with Hope Hampton in the title role and Ralph Errolle as Des Grieux, Eleanor Painter as Carmen, Il trovatore with Frances Peralta as Leonora, and The Barber of Seville with Josephine Lucchese as Rosina.

In 1929 a major windfall came to the PGOC when Mary Louise Curtis Bok offered to support the company in exchange for using the company as an outlet for opera talent in the Curtis Institute of Music. The PGOC accepted the offer and a partnership was formed with Curtis students appearing mostly in minor roles with the company. Plans were initially made to build a new $7,000,000 opera house for the company and the Philadelphia Orchestra but, like many projects of the day, these plans were ultimately abandoned as a result of the financial crisis of the Great Depression. Bok's support, however, did manage to keep the company afloat longer than it probably would have, producing three more seasons of opera at the Academy of Music. Indeed, the company's two major rivals, the Pennsylvania Grand Opera Company and the Philadelphia Civic Opera Company, both closed their doors not long after the Wall Street crash of 1929.

During its remaining years the quality of PGOC's productions increased, particularly in regards to the sets and costumes. The quality of the singers remained high. A highlight of these years was the United States premiere of Alban Berg's Wozzeck on March 19, 1931, with Ivan Ivantzoff in the title role, Anne Roselle as Marie, Gabriel Leonoff as the Drum Major, Sergei Radamsky as Andres, Bruno Korell as the Captain, Ivan Steschenko as the Doctor, and Leopold Stokowski conducting. Stokowski also conducted the world premiere of Carlos Chávez and Diego Rivera's ballet H. P. for the PGOC on March 31, 1932. The company was also notably the first American company to perform Richard Strauss's Elektra in the original German on October 29, 1931, with Roselle in the title role and Charlotte Boerner as Chrysothemis.

The PGOC's final performance was a production of Aida on April 14, 1932, with Roselle in the title role, Aroldo Lindi as Radames, Cyrena van Gordon as Amneris, and Leo de Hierapolis as the King of Egypt. The company closed due to financial reasons in 1932. At the time they canceled the end of the 1931–1932 season and announced the intention of commencing another season for 1933–1934. That never happened, possibly because Mrs. Liedy and her husband both died in 1932. The Curtis Institute of Music was also experiencing financial difficulties at that time and rumors of its imminent closing, which never occurred, were circulating in 1932.

=== The last Philadelphia Grand Opera Companies: 1954-1974 ===
The last company to be called the Philadelphia Grand Opera Company was formed in November 1954 when the Philadelphia Civic Grand Opera and the Philadelphia La Scala Opera Company merged. Anthony Terracciano served as the company's first General Director in its first season but was then succeeded by General Manager Humbert A. Pelosi who was appointed that position at the end of the 1955–1956 season. Terracciano remained with the company as an artistic director through the Spring of 1972. Pelosi left in March 1956 after a feud with Terracciano. He was replaced by conductor Giuseppe Bamboschek who had been working for the company since it began. Bamboschek remained the company's director until 1961 when Terracciano was again made General Manager by longtime friend and musical colleague, Max M. Leon, who was then the opera company's president. This time Terracciano stayed on until 1972.

Although formed in 1954, the company finished the 1954–1955 season performing under the title of the Philadelphia La Scala Opera Company. The company's inaugural performance as the PGOC was of Rigoletto under the baton on Giuseppe Bamboschek on October 13, 1955, at the Academy of Music. The production starred Frank Guarrera in the title role, Lisa di Julio as Gilda, and Eugene Conley as the Duke of Mantua. Other productions that first season included Puccini's La bohème (with Rosanna Carteri as Mimì, Jan Peerce as Rodolfo, and Virginia MacWatters as Musetta), Faust (with Robert Rounseville in the title role, Nicola Moscona as Méphistophélès, and Ellen Faull as Marguerite), Puccini's Madama Butterfly (with Licia Albanese as Cio-cio-san, Walter Fredericks as Pinkerton, Margaret Roggero as Suzuki, and Cesare Bardelli as Sharpless), Italo Montemezzi's L'amore dei tre re (with Beverly Sills as Fiora and Ramón Vinay as Avito), Il barbiere di Siviglia (with MacWatters as Rosina, Guarrera as Figaro, and Cesare Valletti as Almaviva), Cavalleria rusticana (with Maria Gasi as Santuzza), Pagliacci (with Fredericks as Canio and Eva Likova as Nedda), and Aida (with Astrid Varnay in the title role, Kurt Baum as Radamès, Claramae Turner as Amneris, and John Lawler as the King of Egypt).

The Philadelphia Grand Opera Company remained active for two decades, producing six operas during an annual season. The company notably presented the world premiere of Pietro Aria's Jericho Road on March 12, 1969. Many notable singers performed with the company during its history including, John Alexander, Thelma Altman, Salvatore Baccaloni, Cesare Bardelli, Gaetano Bardini, Daniele Barioni, Ara Berberian, Frances Bible, John Brownlee, Giuseppe Campora, Richard Cassilly, George Cehanovsky, Anita Cerquetti, Eugene Conley, Fernando Corena, Viorica Cortez, Mary Costa, Mary Curtis Verna, Jon Crain, Gilda Cruz-Romo, Enrico di Giuseppe, Mignon Dunn, Pierre Duval, Otto Edelmann, Rosalind Elias, Edith Evans, Jean Fenn, Giulio Fioravanti, Nicolai Gedda, Leyla Gencer, Bonaldo Giaiotti, Tito Gobbi, Thomas Hayward, Jerome Hines, Laurel Hurley, Raoul Jobin, Robert Kerns, Dorothy Kirsten, Flaviano Labò, Albert Lance, Brenda Lewis, Thomas LoMonaco, Chester Ludgin, Cornell MacNeil, Jean Madeira, Elaine Malbin, Adriana Maliponte, Susanne Marsee, Robert Merrill, Anna Moffo, Licinio Montefusco, Irene Kramerich, Sonia Leon, Barry Morell, Nicola Moscona, Herva Nelli, Birgit Nilsson, Roberta Peters, Louis Quilico, Luciano Rampaso, Nell Rankin, Regina Resnik, Graciela Rivera, Elinor Ross, Jane Shaulis, Giulietta Simionato, Joanna Simon, Eleanor Steber, Teresa Stratas, Brian Sullivan, Giuseppe Taddei, Ferruccio Tagliavini, Pia Tassinari, Blanche Thebom, Giorgio Tozzi, Norman Treigle, Gabriella Tucci, Richard Tucker, Giuseppe Valdengo, Frank Valentino, Luigi Vellucci, and Jon Vickers to name just a few. The PGOC's last performance was of Johann Strauss II's Die Fledermaus on December 6, 1974, with Joseph Venezia as Alfred, June Fiske as Adele, Eileen Schauler as Rosalinde, Robert Goodloe as Eisenstein, and Carlo Moresco conducting.

The opera board's long-term president, Max Leon, served as the company's manager after the departure of Terracciano in 1972. Experiencing some financial difficulties, the company began talks with the Philadelphia Lyric Opera Company about a possible merger in 1974. An agreement was reached and the two companies merged to form the Opera Company of Philadelphia in 1975 with Leon serving as General Director.
