= Gloria Davy =

American opera singer

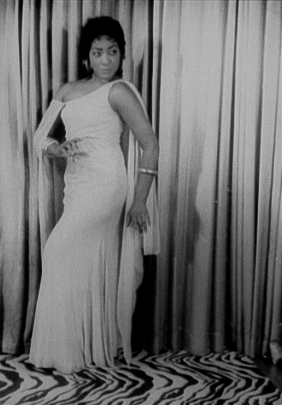
- Gloria Davy in 1958, photographed by Carl Van Vechten
- Born: March 29, 1931; Brooklyn, New York City
- Died: November 28, 2012 (aged 81); Geneva, Switzerland
- Occupation: Singer

Gloria Davy (March 29, 1931 – November 28, 2012) was a Swiss soprano of American birth who had an active international career in operas and concerts from the 1950s through the 1980s. A spinto soprano, she was widely acclaimed for her portrayal of the title role in Verdi's Aida, a role she performed in many of the world's top opera houses. She was notably the first black artist to perform the role of Aida at the Metropolitan Opera in New York City in 1958. While she performed a broad repertoire, she was particularly admired for her interpretations of 20th-century music, including the works of Richard Strauss, Benjamin Britten and Paul Hindemith.

Davy was part of the first generation of African-American singers to achieve wide success and is viewed as part of an instrumental group of performers who helped break down the barriers of racial prejudice in the opera world. She first drew notice in 1952 when she won the Marian Anderson Award, and then as Bess on an international tour of Gershwin's Porgy and Bess from 1954 until 1956. Concert and opera engagements with major orchestras and opera houses in the United States and Europe soon following. In 1959 she married Swiss stockbroker Herman Penningsfield; at which point she left New York to reside in Geneva, Switzerland. After this point her singing career was mainly based in Europe, with only occasional appearances in the United States.

After 1973, Davy's career shifted from opera towards concert work; although she occasionally still performed stage roles. From 1984 to 1997 she taught on the voice faculty at the Jacobs School of Music at Indiana University while still maintaining her home in Geneva. She died in Geneva at the age of 81.

== Early life and education ==
Born in Brooklyn, New York, Davy was the daughter of immigrants from the island of Saint Vincent in the Windward Islands. Her father was a token clerk in the New York City subway system. She graduated from the High School of Music & Art in New York City in 1951 before entering the Juilliard School where she earned a degree in vocal performance in 1953. At Juilliard she was a pupil of Belle Julie Soudant, who also taught opera singers Frances Bible and Andrew Frierson. After completing her degree she remained at Juilliard for one more year to pursue post-graduate studies in opera. In April 1954 she appeared as Countess Madeleine in the U.S. premiere run of Richard Strauss' Capriccio with the Juilliard Opera. She later studied singing in Milan with Victor de Sabata.

Several competition wins drew attention to Davy while she was still a student at Juilliard. In 1952 she was awarded the Marian Anderson Award. In 1953 she won the Music Education League's vocal competition which led to her professional singing debut performing in concert at Town Hall on June 12, 1953 and earned her a contract to perform in concerts with The Little Orchestra Society under conductor Thomas Scherman. With that orchestra she performed Benjamin Britten's Les Illuminations on March 30, 1954. Music critic Ross Parmenter stated in his review that "[Davy is] a singer of unusual technical skill... she has a voice of wide range that is soft, clear, fresh, and warm. She interprets with imagination and intensity and she handles French as if it were her native tongue."

== Early career: 1954–1961 ==
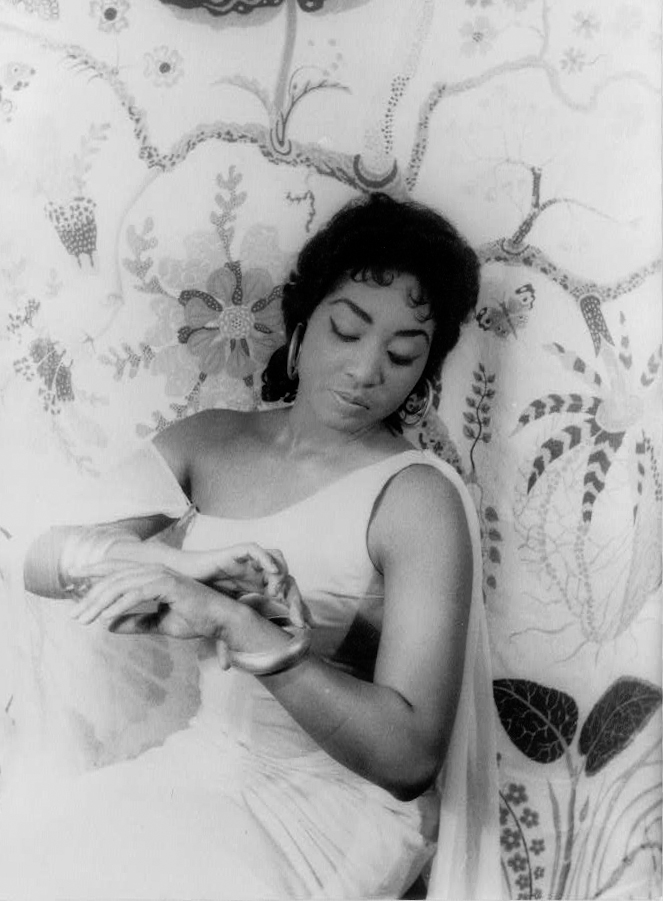
Gloria Davy as Aida in 1958

Davy made her professional stage debut on Broadway as one of the Female Saints in the April 1952 revival of Virgil Thomson's Four Saints in Three Acts at the Broadway Theatre. She returned to Broadway the following October to portray Susie in My Darlin' Aida at the Winter Garden Theatre with Elaine Malbin in the title role. In May 1954 she replaced Leontyne Price as Bess in a North American tour of Gershwin's Porgy and Bess which was organized by impresarios Robert Breen and his wife Wilva Davis. After completing its North American tour in Montreal, Davy went with the production to Europe for performances in Venice, Paris, London, and other cities in Belgium, Germany, Greece, Italy, Switzerland, and Yugoslavia. The company also made a stop at the Cairo Opera House in Egypt. She remained with the international tour through 1956, making further appearances in the Middle East, Africa, Russia, and Latin America.

Davy met composer and conductor Victor de Sabata when the Porgy and Bess tour reached La Scala in Milan in 1955. Impressed with the young singer, he offered her the title role in Verdi's Aida for a return engagement at that house. Unfortunately, political upheaval in Italy led to the cancelation of her scheduled performance at the opera house, and her first appearance as Aida ended up being at the Opéra de Nice in 1957. Later that year she performed that role in concert with the New York Philharmonic at Lewisohn Stadium in New York with Barry Morell as Radamès and Elena Nikolaidi as Amneris. Aida was also her calling card at the Teatro Comunale in Bologna and the Croatian National Theatre, Zagreb, in 1968.

Davy's performance at Lewisohn Stadium drew the attention of several notable music organizations, including the Metropolitan Opera, and she was soon working actively with a variety of music groups in New York. In October 1957 she performed the title role in the New York premiere of Donizetti's Anna Bolena for the American Opera Society (AOS) with Giulietta Simionato as Giovanna Seymour for performances at both Town Hall and Carnegie Hall. In December 1958 she sang with the AOS again as Elcia in Rossini's Mosè in Egitto with Jennie Tourel as Amenofi and Boris Christoff, in his New York debut, singing the title role. In January 1959 she returned to Carnegie Hall to sing the title role in Gluck's Iphigénie en Tauride with Martial Singher as Orestes, Louis Quilico as Thoas and The Little Orchestra Society (LOS). She appeared with the LOS again on October 10, 1960 for the United States premiere of Strauss' Daphne in a concert version at Town Hall in which she sang the title heroine.

On February 12, 1958 Davy made her debut at the Met as Aida with Kurt Baum as Radamès, Leonard Warren as Amonasro, Irene Dalis as Amneris and Fausto Cleva conducting. She was notably the first black artist to appear as Aida at the opera house, and the 4th black artist to appear on the Met stage after Marian Anderson, Robert McFerrin, and Mattiwilda Dobbs. She appeared in 15 performances at the Metropolitan Opera House over four seasons, including performances of Pamina in Mozart's The Magic Flute and Nedda in Leoncavallo's Pagliacci. In July 1961 she toured with the Met to Israel where she performed the role of Fiordiligi in Così fan tutte with the Israel Philharmonic Orchestra in Tel Aviv. Her last appearance at the Met was as Leonora in Il trovatore with Giulio Gari as Manrico in November 1961.

In October 1960 Davy appeared in concert with the Philadelphia Orchestra as the soloist in Beethoven's Symphony No. 9 under conductor Eugene Ormandy at the United Nations General Assembly Hall which was broadcast internationally. The following month she made her debut with the Philadelphia Grand Opera Company with Giuseppe Bamboschek as conductor at the Academy of Music.

== Later life and career: 1961–2012 ==
After Davy left the Met in 1961, her career was no longer centered in New York but in Europe; a decision she made after marrying Swiss stockbroker Herman Penningsfeld in 1959 and making a home with him in Geneva. She began transitioning towards a major European career in 1959 when she performed Aida at both the Vienna State Opera under Herbert von Karajan and at the Royal Opera, London. That same year she performed the role of Dido in Purcell's Dido and Aeneas at the Maggio Musicale Fiorentino. She sang Aida again at the Teatro Regio in Parma in 1960, and was Aida to Jon Vickers' Radamès at the 1961 Berliner Festspiele under the direction of Wieland Wagner.

From 1961 until 1968 Davy was a resident artist at the Berlin State Opera where she sang leading roles in operas by Verdi and Puccini among other composers. During this time she also appeared as a guest artist with other opera houses in Europe. In 1961 and 1962 she sang Pamina at the Théâtre Royal de la Monnaie in Brussels. She returned there in 1969 to sing the Old Prioress in Poulenc's Dialogues of the Carmelites, a role she performed that same year from a wheelchair at the Grand Théâtre de Genève. She made several appearances at La Scala in Milan during the late 1950s and 1960s, portraying both Donna Anna and Donna Elvira in Don Giovanni, Jenny in Kurt Weill's Rise and Fall of the City of Mahagonny, Nedda, and the title role in Madama Butterfly among others. In 1970 she performed the role of Dido at the Teatro Regio in Parma. She remained busy with major opera houses in Europe through 1972, appearing at opera houses in Aachen, Hamburg, Strasbourg, and Mannheim among other cities. From 1973 on her singing career was more focused on concert repertoire, although she still made a few opera appearances afterwards.

While maintaining her home in Geneva, Davy taught on the voice faculty of the Jacobs School of Music at Indiana University from 1984 to 1997. She died on November 28, 2012, in Geneva, Switzerland at the age of 81.

== Discography ==
- Christoph Willibald Gluck – Armide: Umberto Cattini, Orchestra Angelicum di Milano, Coro Polifonico di Torino. Gloria Davy, Angela Arena, Maria Teresa Mandalari, Giuseppe Zampieri, Lidia Cerutti
- Wolfgang Amadeus Mozart – The Magic Flute: Erich Leinsdorf. Gedda, Davy, Tozzi, Peters, Uppman, Scott, Olvis, Krall, Dunn, Amparan, Allen, Franke, Cundari, Vanni, Roggero, Gari, Sgarro, Arthur, Frydel, Roberts. December 6, 1958
- Karlheinz Stockhausen – Momente: Gloria Davy, Boje, Smalley, WDR Choir, Cologne, Ensemble Musique Vivante, Paris, Stockhausen. 1975 Deutsche Grammophon
- Giuseppe Verdi – Aida, highlights in German: Argeo Quadri. Davy, Ahlin, Konya, Hotter, Schoffler. Wiener Staatsopernchor, Staatliches Wiener Volksopern-Orchester, Deutsche Grammophon SLPEM 136 402 (stereo) December 1961; LPEM 19 402 (monaural) November 1963
- Pietro Mascagni – Cavalleria rusticana, highlights in German: Janos Kulka. Davy, Konya, Nagano, Berry, Chor und Orchester der Deutschen Oper Berlin, Deutsche Grammophon SLPEM 136 413 (stereo) March 1965; with highlights in German of Der Bajazzo (Pagliacci) by Leoncavallo
- César Franck – Rébecca – scène biblique: Mario Rossi. Gloria Davy, Pierre Mollet. Chorus and Orchestra, RAI, Torino. Side 6 of MRF Records MRF-148-S(3). Labeled as a Private Recording. The first 5 sides of this 3-LP set are devoted to Gabriel Faurè's Pénélope. Issued 1978 or later.
- Riccardo Zandonai – Conchita: Loris Gavarini (conductor). Gloria Davy, Giuseppe Campora. Cetra LP; Warner Classics CD.
- Giuseppe Verdi – Requiem + Te Deum: Gianfranco Rivoli. Davy, Rehfuss, Peterson, Leal. Chor und Orchester der Wiener Staatsoper. M-2312.
- Shulamit Ran – "O the Chimneys" (Nelly Sachs: "O die Schornsteine") A. Robert Johnson, conductor; Shulamit Ran, pianist. Davy, New York Philomusica Chamber Ensemble. Side 2 of Vox Turnabout TV-S 34492.
