= Eva Likova =

American operatic soprano

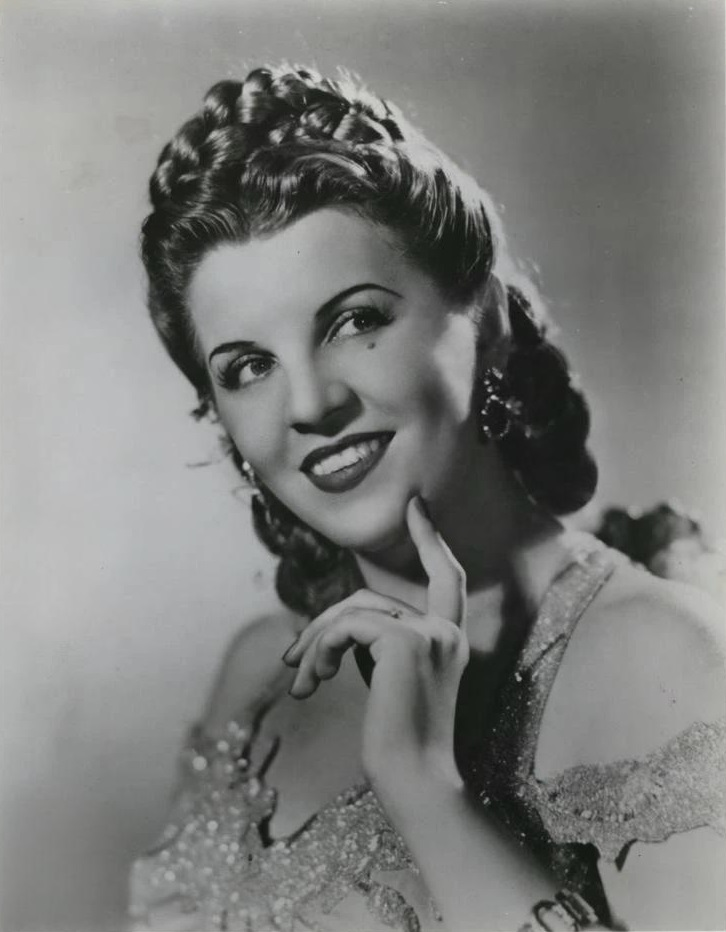
- Likova in 1952
- Born: Eva Pichlíková; 21 December 1919; Prague, Bohemia, Austria-Hungary
- Died: 15 March 2004 (aged 84); Southfield, Michigan, U.S.
- Occupation: Soprano
- Years active: 1943–1983
- Spouse: Jan Joseph Bača (m. 1957; div. 1966)
- Children: 1

Eva Likova (21 December 1919 – 15 March 2004) was an American operatic soprano of Czech descent. She was notably one of the major sopranos at the New York City Opera during the company's early years. She also made guest appearances with a number of opera houses in North America and Europe, enjoying a particularly fruitful partnership with the Philadelphia Grand Opera Company. After retiring from the opera stage in 1966, she embarked on a second career as a voice teacher.

== Biography ==
Born Eva Pichlíková in Prague, Likova studied to be a ballerina before studying singing at the Prague Conservatory with Nektar de Flondor. She made her professional opera debut in 1943 as Mařenka in Bedřich Smetana's The Bartered Bride at the Brno National Theatre where she was committed for two years. From 1945 through 1947 she worked as a principal artist at the Prague National Theatre. She also made a handful of appearances in European films and worked as a dramatic actress and ballet dancer during the early 1940s.

In 1947 Likova came to the United States on a two-year contract with the Detroit Symphony. She first performed in the USA as a concert singer, making her American debut on February 6, 1947 with the Detroit Symphony Orchestra under conductor Karl Krueger. In 1948 she received critical acclaim after appearing with the New York Philharmonic under the direction of Alfredo Antonini before an audience of over 14,000 at the landmark Lewisohn Stadium performing selections from Giacomo Puccini's Madama Butterfly and Ruggero Leoncavallo's Pagliacci. In 1949 made her American opera debut as Violetta in Giuseppe Verdi's La traviata at the New York City Opera (NYCO). She remained committed to the NYCO up through 1957, portraying such roles as Donna Anna and Donna Elvira in Wolfgang Amadeus Mozart's Don Giovanni, Gilda in Verdi's Rigoletto, Liù in Giacomo Puccini's Turandot, Marguerite in Charles Gounod's Faust (opposite Norman Treigle), Micaela in Georges Bizet's Carmen, Musetta in Puccini's La bohème, Nedda in Ruggero Leoncavallo's Pagliacci, Olympia in Jacques Offenbach's The Tales of Hoffmann and the title role in Jules Massenet’s Manon. She returned to the NYCO as a guest artist a number of times up through 1965, with her last performance with the company being Giorgetta in Puccini's Il tabarro.

Likova was active as a guest artist with opera companies throughout the United States during the 1950s and 1960s. In 1953 she made her debut with the Philadelphia Civic Grand Opera Company as Violetta to the Alfredo of Walter Fredericks and Germont of Cesare Bardelli under conductor Giuseppe Bamboschek. She later appeared with the Philadelphia Grand Opera Company as Nedda (1956), Gilda (1957), Adina in Gaetano Donizetti's L'elisir d'amore (1958), Lisette in Puccini's La rondine (1960), Marienka (1960), Musetta (1964), Micaëla (1964), and Nedda (1966). In 1954 she appeared as Zerbinetta in Richard Strauss's Ariadne auf naxos at the Central City Opera. In 1955 she sang Arsena in Johann Strauss II's The Gypsy Baron at the Lewisohn Stadium under conductor Julius Rudel and portrayed Euridice in Christoph Willibald Gluck's Orfeo ed Euridice at the Newport Music Festival with Martha Lipton as Orfeo. In 1956, she sang Dircé in the American Opera Society's production of Luigi Cherubini's Médée at Carnegie Hall with Eileen Farrell in the title role and Arnold Gamson conducting. In 1959, Likova portrayed Oscar in Un ballo in maschera, opposite Herva Nelli and Richard Tucker, for the Opera Guild of Miami.

In 1961 Likova sang Violetta at the Opera Company of Boston with John Alexander as Alfredo and Igor Gorin as Germont under the baton of Sarah Caldwell. That same year she portrayed Liù to Lucille Udovick's Turandot at the San Francisco Opera. She also gave performances at the Pittsburgh Opera and New Orleans Opera among others. She was also active as a concert singer, appearing with such orchestras as the New York Philharmonic and the Chicago Symphony Orchestra. On the international stage she appeared at the Canadian Opera Company, the Great Theatre, Warsaw, the Liceu, the Palacio de Bellas Artes, the Vienna State Opera, the Opéra National de Paris, and with a number of opera houses in Germany and Italy. She was also highly active in filming operatic productions for television in the early 1950s with both NBC and CBC.

After the end of the 1965-1966 season, Likova retired from performing. She joined the faculty of the University of Michigan School of Music, Theatre & Dance, where she taught singing until her retirement in 1983. She later taught privately in both New York City and Philadelphia until returning to Michigan where she lived in Southfield until her death of complications of Alzheimer's disease at the age of 84.
