= Norman Scott (bass) =

American opera singer

Norman Scott (November 30, 1921 – September 22, 1968) was an American operatic bass. He had a long and fruitful association with the Metropolitan Opera in New York City from 1951 up until his death seventeen years later. His repertoire at the Met included well over 50 roles, and he gave a total of 927 performances at the house during his career. A talented actor with an excellent sense of comic timing, Scott excelled in playing secondary characters that were often humorous in nature. Although initially a comprimario singer, Scott was eventually given opportunities to tackle larger leading roles at the Met, and he spent much of his career at that house going back and forth between leading and secondary roles. Although Scott spent the majority of his career at the Met, he did occasionally perform with other opera companies both in the United States and abroad. A major personal triumph came in 1953 when he sang the title role in Béla Bartók's Bluebeard's Castle at the Holland Festival.

== Biography ==
Born in New York to parents of Russian origin, Scott studied business administration at the City College of New York before deciding to pursue a singing career. His opera career was stalled due to World War II, during which time he served as a lieutenant in the United States Navy in the South Pacific.

Soon after returning to the United States, Scott made his professional opera debut with Boris Goldovsky's New England Opera Theater in Boston. Other engagements soon followed at the Chautauqua Opera, New Orleans Opera, Pittsburgh Opera, and the Gran Teatro De La Havana. In 1948 he was invited by Laszlo Halasz to join the roster of singers at the New York City Opera. He became a favorite at that house in smaller comic roles, singing there for the next three seasons.

Scott's popularity among New York audiences led to his being offered a contract by Rudolf Bing to join the roster of singers at the Metropolitan Opera. He accepted, making his debut with the company as Monterone in Giuseppe Verdi's Rigoletto on November 15, 1951 with Leonard Warren in the title role, Richard Tucker as the Duke of Mantua, Hilde Güden as Gilda, and Alberto Erede conducting. He remained at the Met for the rest of his career, initially singing mainly comprimario roles and then later being given larger leading parts. Some of his more important roles at the Met included Colline in La Bohème, Daland in The Flying Dutchman, both The King of Egypt and Ramfis in Aida, Méphistophélès in Faust, Pimen in Boris Godunov, Raimondo in Lucia di Lammermoor, and Sarastro in The Magic Flute. He notably sang supporting roles in the world premiere of Samuel Barber's Antony and Cleopatra and the United States premieres of Gian Carlo Menotti's The Last Savage and Igor Stravinsky's The Rake's Progress. His last appearance at the Met was as Abimélech in Samson et Dalila with James McCracken as Samson, Sandra Warfield as Dalila, and conductor Jean Morel on June 29, 1968.

While singing at the Met, Scott also occasionally worked as a guest artist both in the United States and abroad. In 1950 he toured the United States with Sarah Caldwell's American National Opera Company. In 1952 he made his debut with the Philadelphia La Scala Opera Company as Méphistophélès in Charles Gounod's Faust. In 1953 he sang title role in Béla Bartók's Bluebeard's Castle at the Holland Festival. In 1956 he made his debut with the Vienna State Opera. In 1957 he sang the role of Ramfis with the Philadelphia Grand Opera Company and in 1960 he gave his first performance with the Philadelphia Lyric Opera Company as Sparafucile in Rigoletto. He also appeared in two operas at the Teatro Colón in Buenos Aires in 1960: the role of Alvise in La Gioconda and the role of Padre Guardiano in La forza del destino. Scott also sang in a number of operas and concerts in Germany, England, and Holland during his career.

Scott died in 1968 at the age of 47 after a brief illness at the Beth Israel Medical Center.
