= Robert Goodloe =

American baritone

Robert Goodloe (1936–2024) was an American baritone who was committed to the Metropolitan Opera in New York City from 1964 until 1982 where he gave nearly a thousand performances. While primarily a comprimario performer at the Met, he did portray some leading roles; including Eisenstein in Die Fledermaus, Enrico in Lucia di Lammermoor, Marcello in La bohème, and Sharpless in Madama Butterfly. In 1966 he created the role of Thidias in the world premiere of Samuel Barber's Antony and Cleopatra for the grand opening of the Metropolitan Opera House at Lincoln Center. His performances are preserved on several recordings made for Live from the Metropolitan Opera and the Metropolitan Opera radio broadcasts.

== Life and career ==
Born in St. Petersburg, Florida, Goodloe is a graduate of Northwestern University where he earned a master's degree in journalism in 1959. He then moved to New York City to study opera with Harvey Brown and Armen Boyajian. In 1960 he made his professional debut as Lucas in The Student Prince at the Starlight Theatre in Kansas City, Missouri. He then began voice studies with Robert Larsen in Des Moines, Iowa while concurrently working as director of publications for Simpson College. He performed with an opera company in Des Moines, including appearances as Count Almaviva in Mozart's The Marriage of Figaro. In 1964 he won the Metropolitan Opera National Council Auditions.

Goodloe made his Met debut in 1964 as a Philistine in Samson et Dalila with Jess Thomas and Rita Gorr in the title roles. He continued to perform at the Met over the next 18 years in both secondary and leading roles, including the Apprentice in Wozzeck, Baron Douphol in La traviata, Biterolf in Tannhäuser, both the Commissioner and Sharpless in Madama Butterfly, Coroebus's Ghost in Les Troyens, Count Dominik in Arabella, both Dancaïre and Moralès in Carmen, Donald in Billy Budd, Dumas in Andrea Chénier, Eisenstein in Die Fledermaus, Enrico in Lucia di Lammermoor, Fiorello in The Barber of Seville, Hermann in The Tales of Hoffmann, the Jailer in Tosca, Lavitsky in Boris Godunov, Mandarin and Ping in Turandot, Marcello and Schaunard in La bohème, Marullo in Rigoletto, Mathisen in Le prophète, Montàno in Otello, Nachtigall in Die Meistersinger von Nürnberg, Paolo Albiani in Simon Boccanegra, Pâris in Roméo et Juliette, the Second Knight in Parsifal, the Sergeant in Manon Lescaut, Sid in La fanciulla del West, Silvano in Un ballo in maschera, Silvio in Pagliacci, Sire di Bethune in I vespri siciliani, the Steersman in Tristan und Isolde, and the Surgeon in La forza del destino. He notably created the role of Thidias in the world premiere of Samuel Barber's Antony and Cleopatra for the grand opening of the Metropolitan Opera House at Lincoln Center in 1966. His final appearance with the Met was as Yamadori in Madama Butterfly in 1982.

Goodloe also worked as a guest artist with other opera companies in the United States. In 1969 he made his debut at the San Francisco Opera as Mercutio in Roméo et Juliette with Karl Kritz conducting. In 1974 he made his debut with the Philadelphia Grand Opera Company as Eisenstein in Die Fledermaus conducted by Carlo Moresco. Other companies he performed leading roles with included the Baltimore Opera Company and the Connecticut Opera. Some of the other roles he portrayed on stage included Figaro in The Barber of Seville, Germont in La traviata, Michele in Il tabarro, Prince Yeletsky in The Queen of Spades, and the title role in Gianni Schicchi.
