= Philadelphia Civic Grand Opera Company =

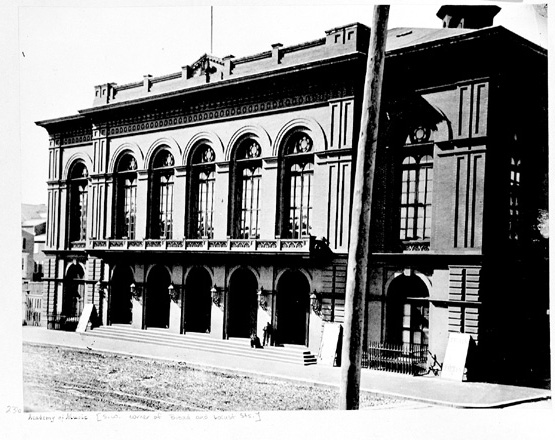
The Academy of Music in Philadelphia.

The Philadelphia Civic Grand Opera Company (PCGOC) was an American opera company located in Philadelphia, Pennsylvania that was actively performing at the Academy of Music between 1950 and 1955. Fausta Cleva served as the company's first General Director and conductor, and Chevalier L. Jackson was the governing board's first president. The company's first performance was of Camille Saint-Saëns's Samson et Dalila on January 24, 1950, with Giovanni Martinelli as Samson, Blanche Thebom as Dalila, Martial Singher as The High Priest of Dagon, and John Lawler as Abimélech. Other operas presented that season were Cavalleria rusticana, L'amico Fritz, and Carmen.

Cleva left the PCGOC after its first season and Giuseppe Bamboschek took over the role of General Director and conductor for the remainder of the company's history. Bamboschek had previously served as musical director of the PCGOC's rival company, the Philadelphia La Scala Opera Company (PLSOC). Bamboschek's first conducting assignment with the company was Aida for the opening of the second season on October 11, 1950, with Herva Nelli in the title role, Kurt Baum as Radames, Margaret Harshaw as Amneris, and Lawler as the King of Egypt. The company mounted a total of 45 opera productions at the Academy of Music during its history, with its last production being Giuseppe Verdi's Rigoletto on October 13, 1955, with Frank Guarrera in the title role, Lisa di Julio as Gilda, and Eugene Conley as the Duke of Mantua.

In 1955 the PCGOC merged with their rival, the PLSOC, to form the Philadelphia Grand Opera Company (PGOC) under General Director Anthony Terracciano. Bamboschek continued on with the PGOC as one of their primary conductors.
