= Nicola Zerola =

Italian opera singer

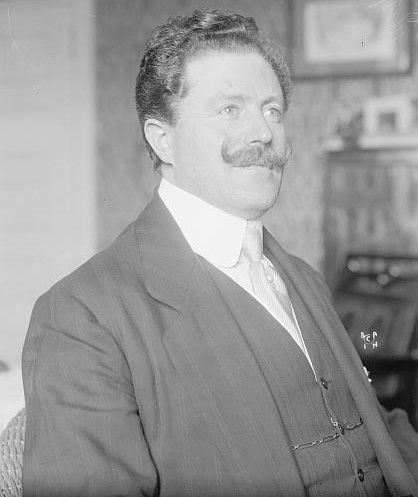
- Born: 1876; Naples, Kingdom of Italy
- Died: 21 July 1936 (aged 59–60); New York City, United States
- Occupation: Operatic tenor

Nicola Zerola (1876 – 21 July 1936) was an Italian operatic tenor who had an active international career from 1898-1928. He began his career in his native country, but was soon heard in concerts and operas internationally during the first years of the 20th century. In 1908 he relocated to the United States where he was active with important opera companies in New York, Chicago, and Philadelphia up into the late 1920s. Between 1909 and 1911 he recorded 13 issued sides for the Victor Talking Machine Company at their Camden, New Jersey studios. He also made 11 solo recordings and one duet for the Gramophone and Typewriter Company in England in 1910-1911.

== Career ==
Born in Naples, Zerola began his career as a baritone and made his professional opera debut in 1898 at the Teatro Rossetti in Trieste as Tonio in Ruggero Leoncavallo's Pagliacci. This was soon followed by performances at the Teatro Comunale Florence and at other opera houses in the Italian provinces. He made his debut as a tenor in 1903 in the role of Canio in Pagliacci. He soon after undertook performances in Belgium, Egypt, France, Spain, the Netherlands, and South America. In November 1908 he had a great success at the Teatro Comunale di Bologna as Radamès to the Aida of Lucia Crestani.

In 1907 Zerola traveled with a small touring company to the United States where he was lauded by critics and audiences. This led to his appointment to New York City's Manhattan Opera Company by Oscar Hammerstein I in 1908. He made his debut with the company in January 1909 at the Manhattan Opera House under conductor Giuseppe Sturani as Radames to the Aida of Mariette Mazarin and Amneris of Marguerite d'Alvarez. He remained there until the company ceased operations in 1910; singing such roles as Manrico in Verdi's Il trovatore and the title role in Verdi's Otello. He also performed Radames opposite Ester Adaberto as Aida with the Italian Grand Opera Company in 1909. He also sang with Hammerstein's Philadelphia Opera Company in 1909-1910. He made his debut with that company as Canio in Pagliacci with Emma Trentini as Nedda at the Philadelphia Opera House on November 25, 1909.

Aïda: La fatal pietra
The opening and close of Act IV, Scene II:
("La fatal pietra" and "Morir! Si pura e bella", with some cuts in the middle),
sung by Nicola Zerola in 1909.

On 21 November 1910 Zerola sang Radames again for his debut with the Chicago Grand Opera Company with Jeanne Korolowicz as Aida. He actively performed with the company through May 1911 in performances in both Chicago and Philadelphia. His other roles with that company included Raoul de Nangis in Giacomo Meyerbeer's Les Huguenots, Manrico, and Otello. In January 1911 he opened the Baltimore Opera Company's new season as Radames. In 1911-1912 he was committed to the Royal Opera House in London where he performed the roles of Riccardo in Verdi's Un ballo in maschera, Canio, Manrico, Otello, Radames, and Raoul de Nangis.

In 1920-1921 Zerola was heard at the Metropolitan Opera in New York City as Canio. and at the Philadelphia Grand Opera Company as Otello. He was also active with the Philadelphia La Scala Opera Company in the 1920s. In 1928 he sang the role of Prinzivalle in the New York premiere of Henry Février's Monna Vanna. He died in New York City in 1936.

https://classicmusiccds.com/product/italian-tenor-nicola-zerola-1876-1936-cd-r/
