= Martha Atwood =

American opera singer

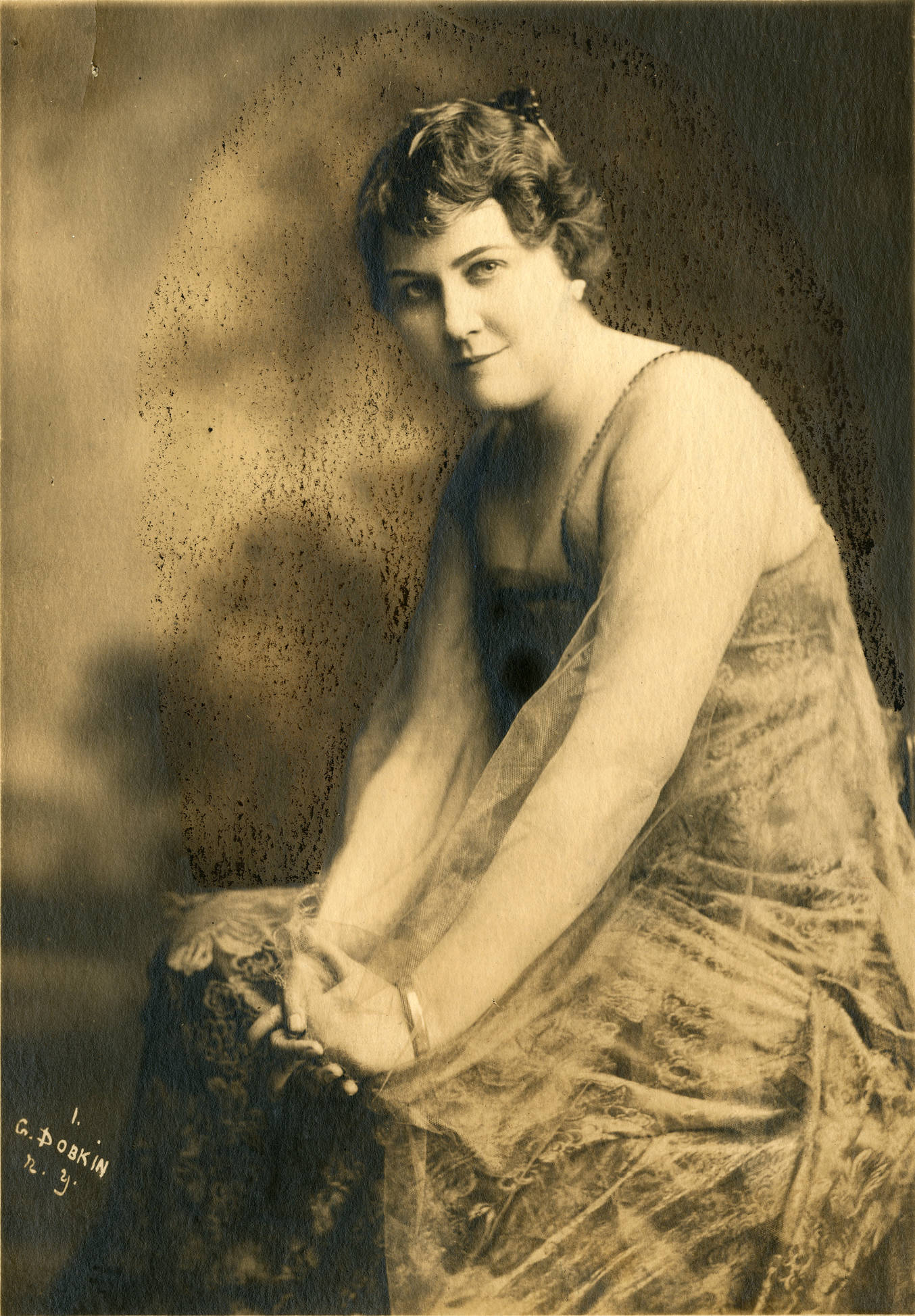
- Martha Attwood in 1926
- Born: October 1886; Wellfleet, Massachusetts
- Died: April 7, 1950 (aged 63); Hyannis, Massachusetts
- Other names: Martha Attwood, Martha Atwood Baker
- Occupations: Singer, music educator

Martha Atwood (sometimes referred to as Martha Atwood Baker or Martha Attwood; October 1886, Wellfleet, Massachusetts – April 7, 1950, Hyannis, Massachusetts) was an American operatic soprano and the founder of the Cape Cod Institute of Music. She was awarded the Medal of Honor from the National Society of New England Women.

== Early life and education ==
Born in Wellfleet, Massachusetts to Captain Simeon Atwood and Martha Burtee Atwood, Atwood was part of a family with a long association with seafaring and the Cape Cod community. She attended Lasell Seminary for Young Women (now Lasell College) before pursuing studies in Italy, France, and Belgium. In Boston she studied with Arthur Wilson, Gertrude Franklin Salisbury, and Frederick Bristol.

== Career ==
Atwood began a career as a leading soprano in Boston, making her first appearance in that city at the Boston City Club. She went on to appear in concert with the Boston Symphony Orchestra and for performances at the Boston Opera House. She made her Italian debut in Siena in 1923.

On November 16, 1926 Atwood made her debut at the Metropolitan Opera (Met) as Liu in the United States premiere of Puccini's Turandot, and was one of the earliest exponents of that role. She performed it nine times at the Met, and also for the work's Philadelphia debut at the Academy of Music. She continued at the Met through 1930 with her final performance there being Nedda in Leoncavallo's Pagliacci. In 1927 she portrayed the title role in Puccini's Tosca with the Philadelphia Grand Opera Company. That same year she performed at the American Legion Convention in Paris. She was also active as a recitalist, performing in such venues as Carnegie Hall, Town Hall, and New York's Gallo Theater among others.

Atwood made several recordings and sang duets with her second husband in 1928. She was heard in radio concerts in the 1920s and 1930s, and in a 1933 radio drama, The Tragedy of an Opera Prima Donna. "I enjoy singing before 'mike', and yet, strangely enough, I forget 'mike' completely," she told a 1930 interviewer. "I look through 'mike' far out over the nation and see the homes in the little town and sing into them. And how they respond!"

In 1938 Atwood founded the Cape Cod Institute of Music which she continued to lead until 1943.

== Personal life ==
Atwood married three times. Her first marriage to Reuben Baker ended in divorce in 1927; as did her second to baritone Alessandro Alberini in 1935. Her third marriage, to financier George R. Baker, ended upon his death in 1944.

Atwood died at Cape Cod Hospital in 1950 at the age of 63.
