= Antony and Cleopatra (Barber) =

Opera by Samuel Barber

- Opera by Samuel Barber
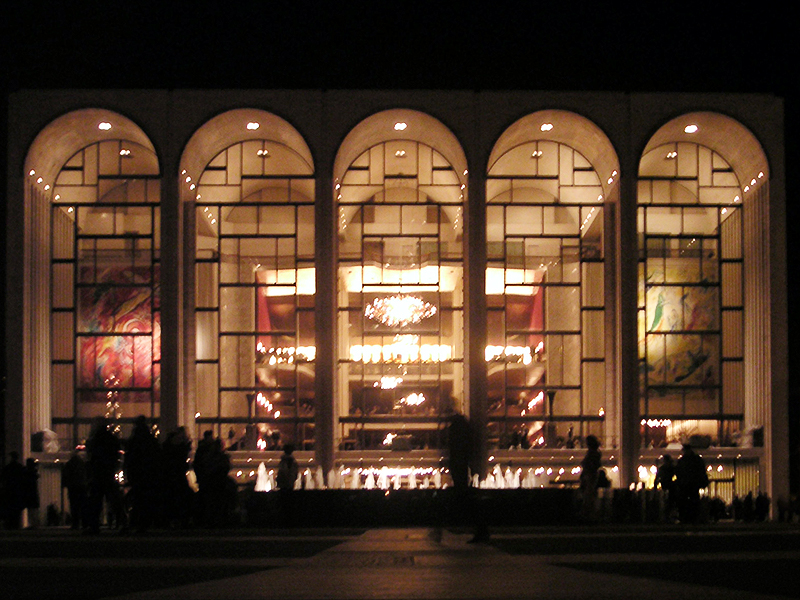
- The Metropolitan Opera House, which opened with this opera
- Librettist: Franco Zeffirelli
- Based on: Antony and Cleopatra by William Shakespeare
- Premiere: September 16, 1966; Metropolitan Opera, New York City

Antony and Cleopatra, Op. 40, is an opera in three acts by American composer Samuel Barber. The libretto was prepared by Franco Zeffirelli. It was based on the play Antony and Cleopatra by William Shakespeare and made use of Shakespeare's language exclusively.

The opera was first performed on September 16, 1966, commissioned for the opening of the new Metropolitan Opera House in Lincoln Center for the Performing Arts in New York City. It was created as a starring vehicle for Leontyne Price. After an unsuccessful premiere, the opera was extensively revised by Barber and Gian Carlo Menotti into an edition first performed in 1975. Barber also prepared a concert suite of Cleopatra's arias entitled Two Scenes from "Anthony and Cleopatra" which was premiered by Price in Washington, D.C. with the National Symphony Orchestra on February 24, 1968. It became a well known concert piece for orchestra and soprano.

== Performance history ==
For the world premiere—also the opening of the new Metropolitan Opera House—no expense was spared, with the creative team including Zeffirelli himself directing and designing the production. The team included choreographer Alvin Ailey, conductor Thomas Schippers, and a top rate cast headed by Leontyne Price as Cleopatra. Condensing Shakespeare's text from five acts in over forty scenes to three acts over three hours, Zeffirelli preserved much of the speaking style of the original tragedy. The stage design and costumes were elaborate; The cast was enormous including 22 principal singers, a full chorus, dozens of extras and a troupe of ballet dancers—a company of 400 performers on stage. Pushing the limits of the cutting-edge technology of the new opera house, the mammoth production was not without problems. A technical error during early rehearsals broke the house's new turntable, causing the entire production to be restaged with movable scenery units. A large hydraulic pyramid of steel, brass, and aluminium dominated the stage with fold up sides that famously trapped Price during the dress rehearsal.

The opera was poorly received by the press, and not enthusiastically received by the public. Among the reasons cited for the opera's lack of success were an "inflated production with problematic technical apparatus, gaudy costumes, overcrowded stage forces, and a press overly attentive to the social glitter of the occasion". Less kindly, the 1966 premiere was retrospectively described as "a hair-curlingly awful production. … The night has gone down in the annals of opera as a landmark of vulgarity and staging excess. Mr. Barber’s score, as we discovered from subsequent exposure to revised excerpts in concert and on records, was to a great extent an innocent victim of the over-all fiasco". The opera was dropped from the Met's repertory after the initial eight performances of the production. The radio broadcast of the premiere, rarely heard after the initial broadcast, was released in 2016, upon the 50th anniversary of the premiere.

Barber later revised the opera, with text revisions by Gian-Carlo Menotti, Barber's partner and the librettist of his first opera, Vanessa. This version was premiered under Menotti's direction at the Juilliard American Opera Center on February 6, 1975. It was given its European premiere in 1980 in concert version at the Théâtre des Champs Élysées, Paris, as part of the "Saison Lyrique de Radio France" under its Music Director, Jean-Pierre Marty. There were further productions at the Spoleto Festival USA and Festival dei Due Mondi in Spoleto, Italy, in 1983, and the Lyric Opera of Chicago in 1991.

== Roles ==
Role	Voice type	Premiere Cast, September 16, 1966 (Conductor: Thomas Schippers)
Cleopatra	soprano	Leontyne Price
Mark Antony	baritone	Justino Diaz
Octavius Caesar	tenor	Jess Thomas
Enobarbus	bass	Ezio Flagello
Charmian, servant to Cleopatra	mezzo-soprano	Rosalind Elias
Iras	mezzo-soprano	Belén Amparan
Mardian	tenor	Andrea Velis
Messenger	tenor	Paul Franke
Alexas	bass	Raymond Michalski
Soothsayer	bass	Lorenzo Alvary
Rustic	baritone	Clifford Harvuot
Octavia	soprano	Mary Ellen Pracht
Maecenas	baritone	Russell Christopher
Agrippa	bass	John Macurdy
Lepidus	tenor	Robert Nagy
Thidias	baritone	Robert Goodloe
Soldier of Caesar	tenor	Gabor Carelli
Eros		Bruce Scott
Dolabella	baritone	Gene Boucher
Canidius	baritone	Lloyd Strang
Demetrius	tenor	Norman Giffin
Scarus	baritone	Ron Bottcher
Decretas	bass-baritone	Louis Sgarro
Captain of the Guard	tenor	Dan Marek
Guard 1	tenor	Robert Schmorr
Guard 2	bass	Edward Ghazal
Guard 3	bass	Norman Scott
Soldier of Antony	bass	John Trehy
Watchman 1	bass	Paul De Paola
Watchman 2	bass	Luis Forero
Sentinel	bass	Peter Sliker

== Recordings ==
Two complete commercial recordings of the opera exist (one of the premiere of the original version, the other of the revision), as well as two scenes sung by Leontyne Price.

- Antony and Cleopatra Metropolitan Opera Radio broadcast of the September 16, 1966 world premiere (original edition). Leontyne Price, soprano, Justino Diaz, bass; The Metropolitan Opera Orchestra & Chorus, Thomas Schippers, conductor. Part of "The Inaugural Season: Extraordinary Met Performances From 1966–67" box set, 2016 (Warner Classics); also available for streaming at Met Opera on Demand.
- Samuel Barber: Two Scenes from Antony and Cleopatra, Op. 40 ["Give Me Some Music" and "Give Me My Robe"], Knoxville: Summer of 1915, Op. 24. Leontyne Price, soprano; New Philharmonia Orchestra, Thomas Schippers, conductor, recorded 1–2 June 1968 (LP recording, stereo, RCA Red Seal LSC-3062, 1969)
- Antony and Cleopatra (complete 1975 edition). Esther Hinds, soprano, Jeffrey Wells, bass; The Spoleto Festival Orchestra and Westminster Choir (Joseph Flummerfelt, chorus master), Christian Badea, conductor. Recorded during the 1983 Festival of Two Worlds in Spoleto, Italy (2-CD set, stereo, New World Records NW 322/23/24-2, 1984)
