= Anna Fitziu =

American soprano

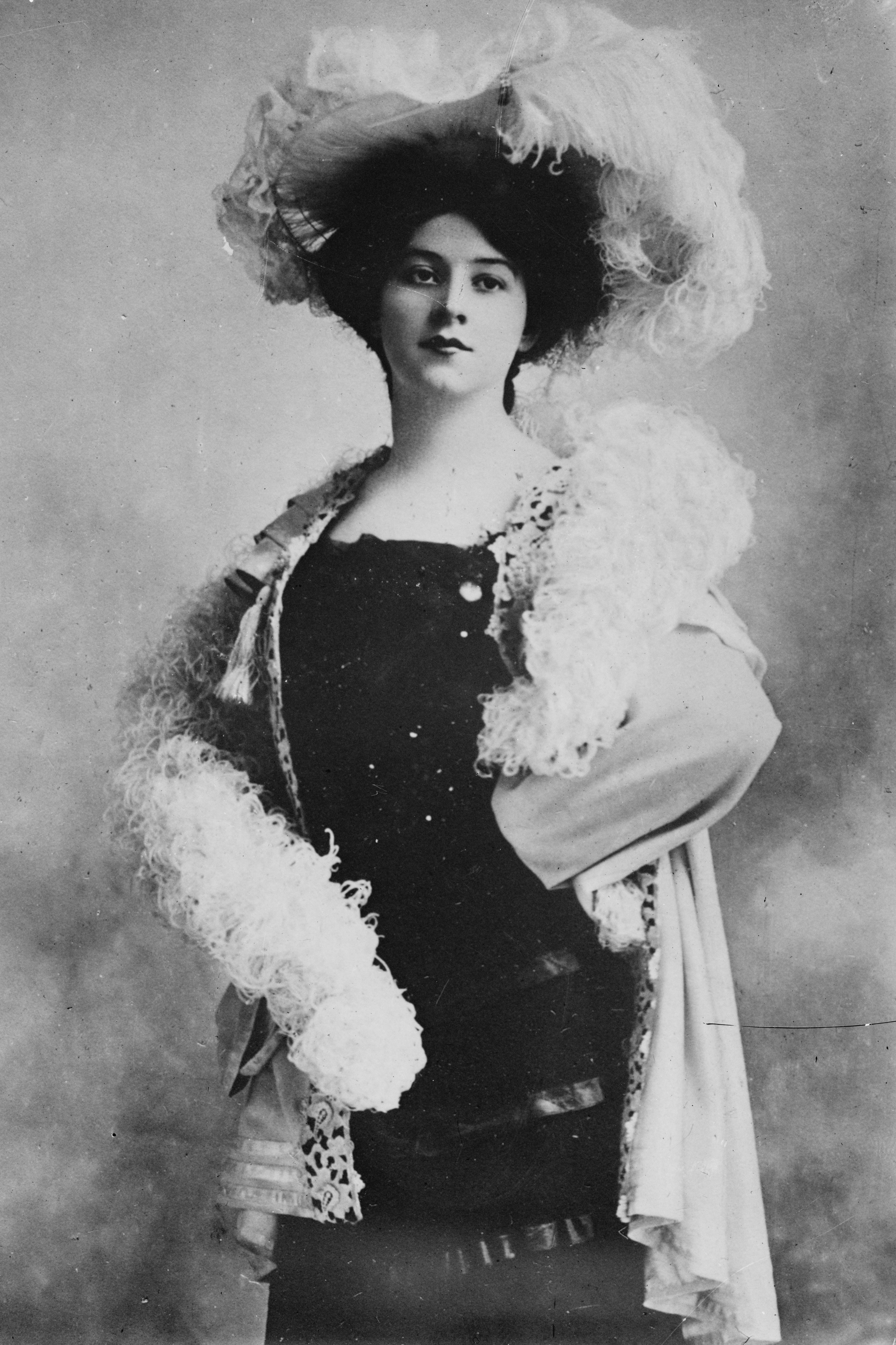
- Born: Anna Powell; April 1, 1887; Huntington, West Virginia
- Died: April 20, 1967 (aged 80); Hollywood, California

Anna Fitziu (April 1, 1887 – April 20, 1967) was an American soprano who had a prolific international opera career during the early part of the 20th century. Her signature roles included Fiora in L'amore dei tre re, Mimi in La bohème, Nedda in Pagliacci, and the title roles in Isabeau, Madama Butterfly, and Tosca. After her singing career ended, she embarked on a second career as a voice teacher. Among her notable pupils was opera singer Shirley Verrett.

== Early life and career ==
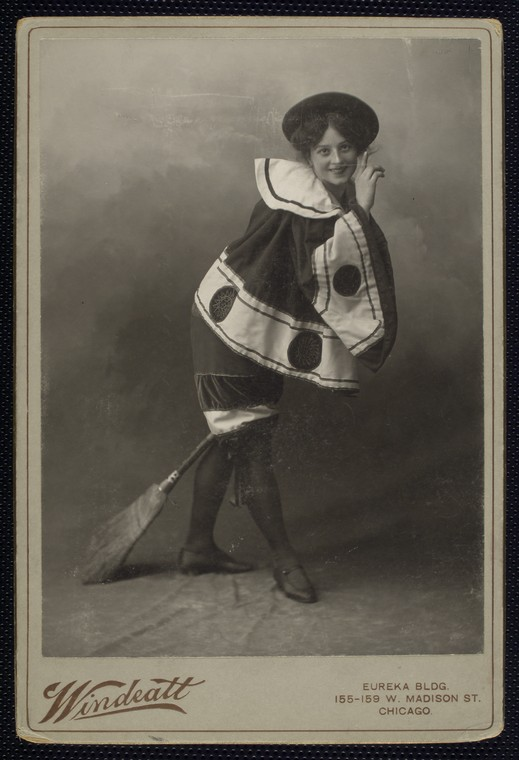
"Anna Fitzhugh" in The Wizard (1903)

She was born as Anna Powell in Huntington, West Virginia, on April 1, 1887. Fitziu began her career as a chorus girl and concert soloist in New York City in 1902. At this point in her career she worked under the name "Anna Fitzhugh", taking the last name from an old Virginia family (a member of which included Continental Congress delegate William Fitzhugh) that she was related to. She went to Chicago in early 1903 to portray a number of smaller roles in the musical comedy The Wizard. She remained in Chicago through 1904 appearing in leading roles in operettas and musical comedies like Baroness Fiddlesticks and Sergeant Brue. From 1905 to 1906, she performed on the American vaudeville circuit.

== Opera career ==
c. 1920 recording of "Vissi d'arte" from Puccini's Tosca. Sung by Anna Fitziu.

In 1906 Fitziu went to Paris where she studied singing with William Thorn for several years. She adopted the stage name "Anna Fitziu" when she made her first opera appearance in 1910 at the Teatro Dal Verme in Milan as Elsa in Richard Wagner's Lohengrin. She remained in Italy for the next five years, performing in leading roles at such opera houses as the Teatro dell'Opera di Roma, the Teatro di San Carlo, the Teatro Massimo, and La Fenice. She also made appearances at the Palacio de Bellas Artes in Mexico City and the Teatro Colón in Buenos Aires.

In 1915 Fitziu was offered a short-term contract at the Metropolitan Opera in New York City. She accepted, making her debut with the company as Rosario in the world premiere of Enrique Granados's Goyescas on January 28, 1916, with Giovanni Martinelli as Fernando, Flora Perini as Pepa, Giuseppe De Luca as Paquiro, and Gaetano Bavagnoli conducting. It was the only role she ever performed at the Met, although she did appear in several Sunday Night Concerts at the house. In 1916 she was committed to the New Orleans Opera.

From 1917 to 1919, Fitziu was a principal soprano of the Chicago Opera Association. With the company she notably portrayed the title role in the world premiere of Henry Kimball Hadley's Azora, the Daughter of Montezuma on December 26, 1917, and portrayed the title role in the United States premiere of Alfredo Catalani's Loreley in 1919. She later sang with the Chicago Civic Opera from 1922 to 1926. In 1921 and 1926 she toured the United States with the San Carlo Opera Company. On November 6, 1924, she sang Mimì in La bohème for the very first performance presented by the Philadelphia Civic Opera Company. She also appeared in operas at the Ravinia Festival in the early 1920s and appeared at the Havana Opera in 1924 as Desdemona in Otello with Giovanni Martinelli in the title role.

== Work as a voice teacher and later life ==
In 1927 Fitziu retired from the stage after suffering a nervous breakdown. She turned to writing for a time and was able to publish some works of short fiction. She took up teaching singing privately in New York City in 1929. She continued to teach singing for the rest of her life, first in Chicago and then in Los Angeles. Among her notable pupils was Shirley Verrett.

She died on April 20, 1967, in Hollywood, California, at the age of 80, after falling down a staircase.

== Personal life ==
She was engaged to Andrés de Segurola in 1920, but they never married. She then married Dr. John J. Harty, who pre-deceased her.
