= Philadelphia Civic Opera Company =

The Philadelphia Civic Opera Company (PCOC) was an American opera company located in Philadelphia, Pennsylvania, that was actively performing between 1924 and 1930. Founded by Philadelphia socialite Mrs. Henry M. Tracy, the company was established partially through funds provided by the city of Philadelphia and its then-mayor, W. Freeland Kendrick. The company was led by Artistic Director Alexander Smallens. Tracy served as the company's president and ran the business side of the organization while Smallens served as the company's primary conductor and made all of the artistic decisions. W. Attmore Robinson was later brought in to help Smallens with some of the artistic direction. The company performed between 10 and 15 operas every year during an annual season until it went bankrupt a year after the Wall Street crash of 1929.

== Performance history ==
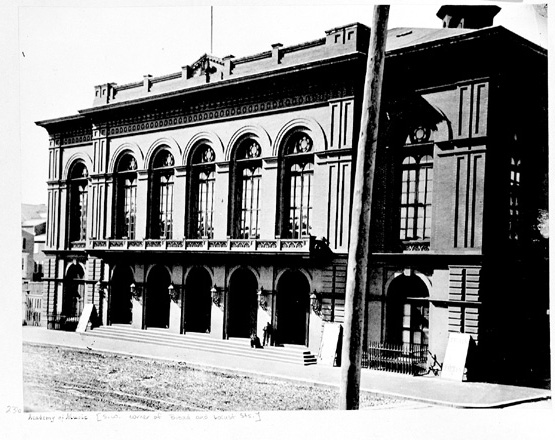
The Academy of Music in Philadelphia

The PCOC performed all of their productions at Philadelphia's Metropolitan Opera House (MOH) up through the spring of 1928. The company's first performance was of Giacomo Puccini's La bohème on November 6, 1924, with Anna Fitziu as Mimì, Romeo Boscacci as Rodolfo, Alfredo Gondolfi as Marcello, Emily Stokes Hagar as Musetta, and Smallens conducting. Occasionally the company presented more rarely heard works, including the American premieres of Erich Wolfgang Korngold's Der Ring des Polykrates (February 10, 1927), Manuel de Falla's El amor brujo (March 17, 1927), Richard Strauss's Feuersnot (December 2, 1927), and Strauss's Ariadne auf Naxos (November 1, 1928). However, the company mainly presented works from the standard opera repertory.

In the autumn of 1928 the company began performing at the Academy of Music instead of the MOH. Their first performance at the academy was Giuseppe Verdi's Aida on October 18, 1928, with Emily Roosevelt in the title role, Paul Althouse as Radamès, Julia Claussen as Amneris, Reinhold Schmidt as the King of Egypt, Nelson Eddy as Amonasro, and Smallens conducting. The PCOC continued to perform at the academy up until financial problems forced the company to disband in 1930.

== Collapse of the company ==
With the onset of the Great Depression, the PCOC, like many other American arts organizations, began experiencing serious financial concerns. Although numerous efforts to assuage the company's problems were made, the company was forced to declare bankruptcy in April 1930. One last effort to revive the company was made the following Fall when the company gave its last performance, Ruggero Leoncavallo's Pagliacci, on October 30, 1930, with Aroldo Lindi as Canio, Helen Jepson as Nedda, and John Charles Thomas as Tonio.

One reason for its collapse was noted:

"Last spring when the Philadelphia Civic Opera Company disbanded [..] there was given an obituary luncheon at which Conductor Alexander Smallens, now assistant leader of the Philadelphia Orchestra, called opera in Philadelphia a "bataille des dames" (battle of ladies). The time had come, he said, when every lady with a lot of money felt that she should have her own opera company. His reference was to three local troupes which had announced ambitious schedules at the beginning of the season: the Pennsylvania Grand Opera Company (president: Mrs. Houston Dunn) which succumbed with the stock-market crash in the fall; his own Philadelphia Civic Opera Company (president: Mrs. Henry M. Tracy) which had bravely survived six seasons; the Philadelphia Grand Opera Company (president: Mrs. Joseph Leidy)."

== Notable singers ==
- Paul Althouse
- Georges Baklanoff
- Julia Claussen
- Nelson Eddy
- Anna Fitziu
- Helen Jepson
- Aroldo Lindi
- Maybelle Marston
- George Rasely
- Marie Sundelius
- John Charles Thomas
- Ettore Verna
