= Brenda Lewis =

American opera soprano (1921–2017)

- Born: March 2, 1921; Harrisburg, Pennsylvania
- Died: September 16, 2017 (aged 96); Westport, Connecticut
- Occupation: Opera singer

Brenda Lewis (March 2, 1921 – September 16, 2017) was an American operatic soprano, musical theatre actress, opera director, and music educator. She enjoyed a 20-year-long collaboration with the New York City Opera (NYCO) with whom she notably created roles in several world premieres by American composers; including the title role in Jack Beeson's Lizzie Borden in 1965. She also performed with frequency at the Metropolitan Opera from 1952 to 1965, and was active as a guest artist with notable opera companies both nationally and internationally. Although she is mainly remembered as an exponent of American operas and musicals, she performed a broad repertoire of works and was particularly celebrated for her portrayals of Marie in Wozzeck, Rosalinde in Die Fledermaus, and the title roles of Carmen and Salome; the latter of which she performed for the inauguration of the Houston Grand Opera in 1956.

Lewis was also a familiar face to Broadway audiences in operettas, operas, and musicals; appearing in eight productions between 1944 and 1964. Her most successful appearance on Broadway was in the role of Birdie Hubbard in the world premiere of Marc Blitzstein's Regina in 1949. She later became closely associated with the title role in that work which she performed and recorded on disc with the NYCO in 1958. After retiring from the stage, she worked as a voice teacher and opera director at the Hartt School of Music. She also directed and produced operas for the New Haven Opera Theater from 1963 until 1973.

== Education and early career ==
Born Birdie Solomon into a Jewish family in Harrisburg, Lewis was raised in Sunbury, Pennsylvania, where her father worked in the metal business. Her family provided her with music lessons throughout her childhood, including sending her to an arts camp in Maryland called Camp Louise during the summers while she was a teenager. She briefly studied pre-medicine at Pennsylvania State University where she was also a member of the glee club. She then won a scholarship to the Curtis Institute of Music where she was a pupil of Emilio de Gogorza and Marion Freschl.

While a student at Curtis, Lewis made her professional opera debut in December 1939 at the age of 18 as the 'Prima giovinetta' in Mozart's The Marriage of Figaro with Sylvan Levin's Philadelphia Opera Company (POC). She appeared in several more roles with the POC over the next three years, including Esmeralda in The Bartered Bride (1940), Minni in Die Fledermaus (1940), Giulietta in The Tales of Hoffmann (1941), the Marschallin in Der Rosenkavalier (1941), a young girl in Emil von Reznicek's Spiel oder Ernst? (1941), and Dorabella in Così fan tutte (1942).

== Work in New York City ==
In May 1944 Lewis made her Manhattan debut on Broadway with the New Opera Company as Hanna Glawari in Lehar's The Merry Widow opposite Jan Kiepura. With that company she was also seen on Broadway in 1944 as the title heroine in Ermanno Wolf-Ferrari's Il segreto di Susanna. In 1948 she returned to Broadway to portray the role of the Female Chorus in the United States premiere of Britten's The Rape of Lucretia. The following year she created the role of Birdie Hubbard in the world premiere of Marc Blitzstein's Regina. She later portrayed the title role in that opera at the New York City Opera (NYCO) in 1953 and 1958. She returned to Broadway twice more during her career, both in musicals: as Lotta Leslie in The Girl in Pink Tights (1954) with French ballet star Zizi Jeanmaire and soprano Marni Nixon and as Mme. Cole in Cafe Crown (1964).

In late 1944/early 1945 Lewis performed the role of Saffi in The Gypsy Baron in the NYCO's United States tour which was the brain child of impresario Sol Hurok. She then made her Lincoln Center debut with the NYCO as Santuzza in Cavalleria rusticana. She went on to sing several more roles with the NYCO over the next 20 years, including Cio-Cio-San in Madama Butterfly, Donna Elvira in Don Giovanni, Idiomantes in Idomeneo, Marenka in The Bartered Bride, Marguerite in Faust, and the title roles in Carmen and Salome among others. In 1959 she portrayed Zinida in the original production of Robert Ward's He Who Gets Slapped. Her final role with the NYCO was in another world premiere: the title role in Jack Beeson's Lizzie Borden in 1965. That production was filmed by WGBH in Boston and broadcast nationally on PBS in 1967.

While more frequently seen at the NYCO, Lewis was also a regular performer at the Metropolitan Opera during the 1950s and 1960s. She made her Met debut on January 24, 1952, as Musetta in La bohème with Bidu Sayão as Mimi, Eugene Conley as Rodolfo, and Alberto Erede conducting. In 1953 her Met performance of Rosalinde in Die Fledermaus was filmed and broadcast live on the television program Omnibus. She later appeared on Omnibus again in 1958 singing selections from Carmen, Faust, and Salome under conductor Leonard Bernstein. Other roles she sang at the Met included Donna Elvira, Marina in Boris Godunov, Venus in Tannhäuser, and the title roles in Carmen, Salome, and Vanessa. Her final performance at the Met was as Marie in Wozzeck in February 1965.

== Other work and later life ==
Lewis gave her first international performance at the Opéra de Montréal in 1945. She made several appearances at the Teatro Municipal in Rio de Janeiro during the 1940s and 1950s, including the roles of Venus, Musetta, Santuzza, Marguerite, Marina, and Donna Elvira. At the Vienna Volksoper she portrayed the title roles in the Austrian premieres of Cole Porter’s Kiss Me, Kate (1956) and Irving Berlin's Annie Get Your Gun (1957). She subsequently performed both these roles and the title roles in Carmen and Salome at the Zurich Opera in Switzerland.

Lewis also appeared as a guest artist with numerous American opera companies, including the Central City Opera, Cincinnati Opera, Dallas Opera, Fort Worth Opera, New Orleans Opera, Opera Company of Boston, Pittsburgh Opera, San Antonio Grand Opera Festival, and the Seattle Opera among others. She sang several roles with the San Francisco Opera from 1950 to 1952, including Cherubino in The Marriage of Figaro, Donna Elvira, Giorgetta in Il tabarro, The Marschallin, Musetta, and Salome. In 1956 she portrayed Salome for the very first opera performances presented by the Houston Grand Opera. In 1960 she created the role of Sara in the world premiere of Philip Bezanson's Christmas opera Golden Child which was commissioned for television by the NBC Opera Theatre. In 1965 she performed Marie in Wozzeck at the Lyric Opera of Chicago with Geraint Evans in the title role. One of her last opera performances was as Rosalinde at the Philadelphia Grand Opera Company under the baton of Carlo Moresco in December 1967.

After retiring from the opera stage in the late 1960s, Lewis devoted her time to producing and directing operas at the New Haven Opera Theater from 1963 to 1973. She then joined the voice faculty at the Hartt School of Music in 1973 where she taught voice and directed student opera productions for many years. She has two children, Leo and Michael Asen, with conductor and violist Simon Asen (1911–1984), whom she was married to from 1944 until their divorce in 1959. Shortly after her divorce to Asen, she married engineer Benjamin Cooper who founded the American Technion Society. She gave birth to their daughter, Edith Cooper, in 1960. They remained married until Cooper's death in 1991.

Lewis died on September 16, 2017, at her home in Connecticut, aged 96.

== Recordings ==
- Giacomo Puccini's La bohème (1953, Metropolitan Radio Broadcast with Victoria de los Ángeles, now available through Omega Opera Archive and House of Opera CD)
- The Girl in Pink Tights – Original Broadway Cast Album (1954)
- Marc Blitzstein's Regina (1958, Sony)
- Song of Norway – Jones Beach Marine Theater (1958)
