= Georges Sébastian =

Hungarian-French conductor (1903–1989)

- Georges Sébastian (photo with 1959 dedication)
- Born: György Sebestyén
- Occupation: conductor

Georges Sébastian (August 17, 1903 – April 12, 1989) was a French conductor of Hungarian birth, particularly associated with Wagner and the post-romantic repertory (Bruckner, Mahler, Richard Strauss). He was born in Budapest and died in La Hauteville.

Born György Sebestyén, he studied first the piano and violin in his native Budapest, before turning to composition. He then worked with Leo Weiner, Zoltán Kodály and Béla Bartók. In 1921, he was engaged as répétiteur at the Munich State Opera, where he worked with Bruno Walter and became his assistant conductor the following year.

He then spent one season from 1923–24 as assistant conductor at the Metropolitan Opera in New York, where he was heard as pianist. Upon his return in Europe, he conducted at the opera houses of Hamburg and Leipzig, before becoming first conductor at the Städtische Oper Berlin (1927–30). He then became musical director of the Moscow Radio and Philharmonic Orchestra (1931–37). In 1935, he conducted there the first performance of the original version of Moussorgsky's opera, Boris Godunov.

In 1938, he returned to America and spent the war years there, holding several posts including conductor at the San Francisco Opera, musical director of a radio program for CBS, and musical director of the Scranton Philharmonic Orchestra.

After the war, he returned to Europe, and settled in France. He made his debut at the Palais Garnier in 1947, and was to conduct there the debuts of both Maria Callas (1958) and Renata Tebaldi (1959). He was also very active conducting on French radio, notably the complete symphonies of Bruckner and Mahler.

He recorded complete sets of Lakmé (with Mado Robin, 1952) and Mignon (1953) for Decca Records; and Thaïs (with Géori Boué, 1952) and Werther (with Suzanne Juyol, 1952) for Urania. His best-known recording may be, however, that of excerpts from Carmen (1946), with Risë Stevens, Nadine Conner, Raoul Jobin and Robert Weede, for Columbia Records. Among Sébastian's "pirate" recordings are Elektra (1966) and Salome (1967), both with Anja Silja.

EMI has published the kinescope of the Callas debut, "La Grande Nuit de l'Opéra," on DVD. Included are excerpts from La forza del destino, Norma, Il trovatore, Il barbiere di Siviglia, and a staged Act II of Tosca (also with Albert Lance and Tito Gobbi).

== Sources ==
- Le dictionnaire des interprètes, Alain Pâris (Éditions Robert Laffont, 1989). ISBN 2-221-06660-X
