= Aroldo Lindi =

Swedish operatic tenor (1888–1944)

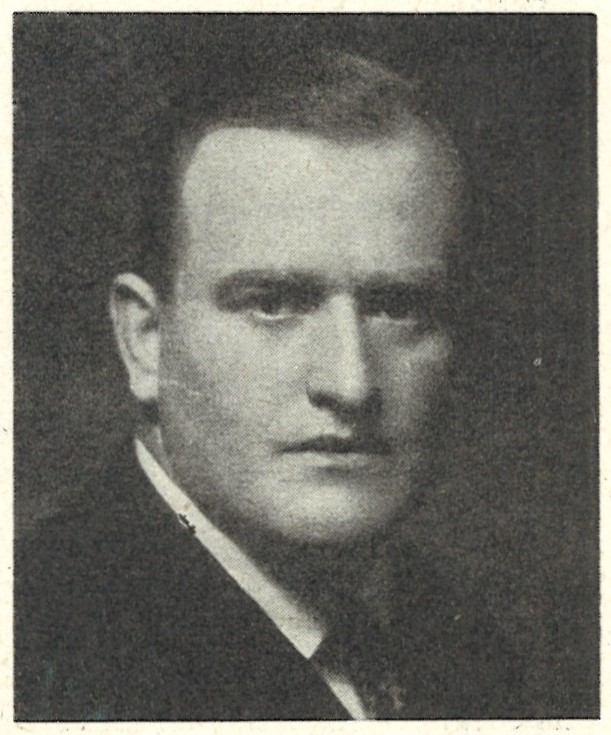
Aroldo Lindo around 1930.

Aroldo Lindi, born Gustav Harald Lindau, (26 May 1888 – 8 March 1944) was a Swedish operatic tenor who enjoyed an international career, appearing at La Scala and at Covent Garden from 1925. In the United States, he appeared with the Philadelphia Grand Opera Company, the Philadelphia Civic Opera Company and the Chicago Civic Opera.

According to Robert Rushmore in his book The Singing Voice, Lindi dropped dead onstage after completing the aria "Vesti la giubba" in Ruggero Leoncavallo's Pagliacci at the War Memorial Opera House in San Francisco. According to the blog Forgotten Opera Singers, his friend Coe Glade witnessed his death and described it in an interview for the Vocal Record Collectors' Society in Chicago.

== Sources ==
- Kastrup, Allan, The Swedish heritage in America, Swedish Council of America, 1975, p. 726
- Lindau, Richard, Aroldo Lindi, the Singing Pugilist, Grandi Tenori
