= Giuseppe Bamboschek =

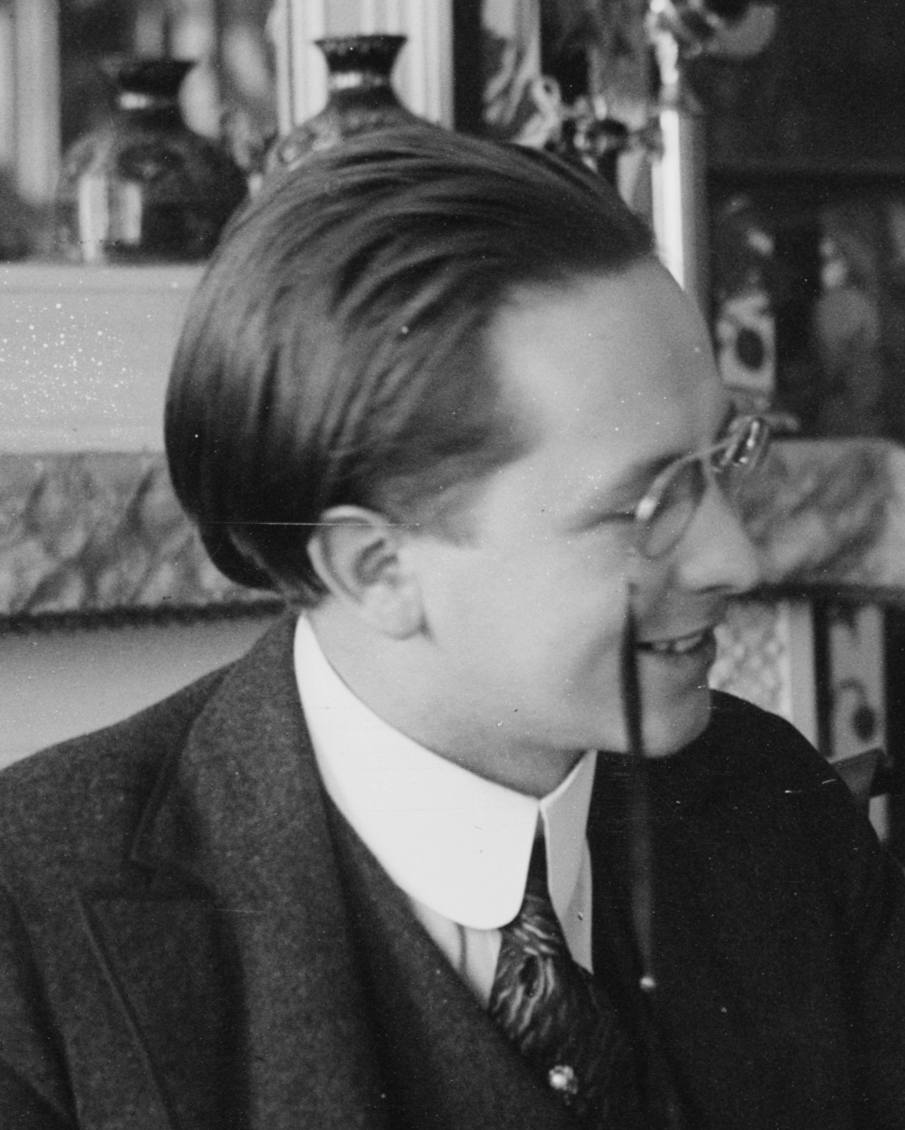
Giuseppe Bamboschek in 1915

Giuseppe Maria Bamboschek (1890–1969) was an Italian-American opera conductor, pianist, organist, music director and film director. During his expansive career, Bamboschek conducted performances including famed singers Enrico Caruso, Rosa Ponselle, Giovanni Martinelli, Giuseppe De Luca, and many more.

== Biography ==
Born in Trieste - the main port of the Austrian Empire - in 1890, Bamboschek studied at the Trieste Conservatory. At age 13 he held a position as an organist. When he was 18 years old, he conducted orchestral concerts in Trieste. Later, moving to the United States, he became a conductor for the Metropolitan Opera in New York from 1913 to 1929. He made his conductor/soloist debut with the Berlin Philharmonic on 21 June 1924.

Bamboschek also became a mentor and teacher to numerous classical singers of the time, among them included Beverly Sills, Franco Alfano, Aroldo Lindi, and Jeanette MacDonald. He gave the young Beverly Sills her big break in 1947.

He then became General Manager of the Philadelphia Civic Grand Opera Company (PCGOC) in 1950. When the PCGOC merged with the Philadelphia La Scala Opera Company to form the Philadelphia Grand Opera Company (PGOC) in 1955, Bamboschek stepped down as director but stayed with the company as their primary conductor. After the PGOC went through two General Directors in two seasons, Bamboschek was appointed General Director of the PGOC in March 1957.

He moved into new creative territory around this time, with a directorial credit to 1955's "Opera Cameos", a television series of operatic highlights including Verdi's La traviata.

His grave is located in St. Marys Cemetery, Yonkers, NY, Section N, he is buried with his wife Caroline Ghidoni Bamboschek. (1889-1974)
