= Albert Lance =

French opera singer

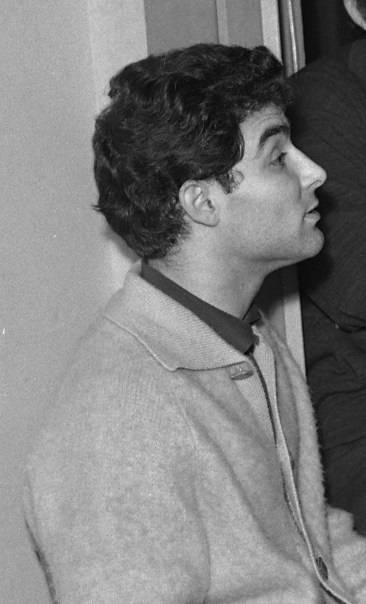

Background information
- Born: Lancelot Albert Ingram; 12 July 1925; Medindie, South Australia, Australia
- Origin: Australia
- Died: 15 May 2013 (aged 87) Colomars, France
- Occupation: Opera singer
- Years active: 1950–2011

Albert Lance (12 July 1925 – 15 May 2013) was an Australian tenor, also holding French citizenship. He was Australia's principal tenor during the 1950s and later enjoyed a highly successful career in France.

He was born in Medindie, South Australia as Lancelot Albert Ingram, but was usually known as Lance Ingram. He began singing as a child, in school and in church choir. His mother made him study voice at the Melbourne Music Conservatory. After graduation, he sang in cafés and night clubs, and joined a touring company and performed throughout Australia, singing popular songs. The director of that company was impressed enough to send him for an audition at the Melbourne Opera, where he was immediately offered a contract. He made his debut there, as Cavaradossi in Tosca, in 1950, and went on to sing Rodolfo in La bohème, and Pinkerton in Madama Butterfly, to considerable acclaim. He then appeared as the lead in The Tales of Hoffmann given in honour of Queen Elizabeth II in 1953.

Ingram was noticed by the wife of the famed voice teacher Modesti, who invited him to France, for further study. Under Modesti's guidance, and with the help of his assistant, Simone Féjart, he acquired considerable refinement, both vocal and musical. Having changed his professional name from Lance Ingram to Albert Lance, he made his Paris debut at the Opéra-Comique in 1955, as Cavaradossi. The following year, he made his debut at the Palais Garnier, in the title role in Faust, and the success was immediate. He quickly established himself as one of the leading "French tenors" of the time, at both the Opéra-Comique and the Opéra until 1972, singing the great French roles such as Roméo in Roméo et Juliette, des Grieux in Manon, Werther, Don José in Carmen, etc. He was also invited to perform at the opera houses of Lyon, Bordeaux, and Marseille, as well as London, Vienna, Moscow, Leningrad, and Buenos Aires. Lance was also much appreciated in the Italian repertory, adding to his repertory the lead tenor roles in Rigoletto, La traviata, Cavalleria rusticana, Pagliacci and others.

Lance made his American debut at the San Francisco Opera in 1961, in the creation of Norman Dello Joio's Blood Moon. He also appeared in Los Angeles and Philadelphia.

Lance became a permanent member of the Opéra national du Rhin in Strasbourg from 1973 until his retirement in 1977. After his retirement from the stage, Lance turned to full-time teaching, first at the Music Conservatory of Nice, and later Antibes. Lance became a French citizen in 1967.

Lance left a few recordings, notably a complete Werther made in 1964, with Rita Gorr, Mady Mesplé, Gabriel Bacquier, conducted by Jésus Etcheverry. There is also a complete Madama Butterfly (in French) from the Opéra Comique de Paris conducted Albert Wolff from 1957 with Lance as Pinkerton, and scenes from Hérodiade conducted by Georges Prêtre from 1963 with Lance as Jean alongside the Salomé of Régine Crespin and Hérodiade of Rita Gorr.

EMI has published the kinescope of the 1958 Paris debut of Maria Callas, "La Grande Nuit de l'Opéra," in which Lance appeared, on DVD. He is heard in an excerpt from Il trovatore, and is seen in a staged Act II of Tosca, opposite Callas and Tito Gobbi, conducted by Georges Sébastian.

In March 2011, the French opera community announced that Lance would be the first Australian to be the President of the Paris Opera Jubilee.

Albert Lance died on 15 May 2013 in Colomars, France.

Lance is survived by wife and former mezzo-soprano Iris Paqué, daughter Marie-Christine Lance and grandson Matthew.
