= Walter Fredericks =

American opera singer (1916–2000)

Walter Fredericks in 1958

Walter Fredericks (April 16, 1916 – July 24, 2000) was an American operatic tenor and concert singer active from the late 1940s until at least the 1980s.

== Biography ==
A native of Camden, New Jersey, Fredericks worked as a machinist before friends encouraged him to audition for the Academy of Vocal Arts in Philadelphia, where he won a scholarship. While traveling with the Ice Follies, he started his operatic career in 1947, performing with the San Francisco Opera. Soon maestro Gaetano Merola of the SFO convinced patrons to award the singer with a year of additional study in Italy. Upon his return to the United States, Fredericks appeared with many of the country's foremost opera companies including those in Philadelphia, Los Angeles, Pittsburgh, New Orleans, and New York. He had also been a guest soloist of many of symphony orchestras throughout the U.S. and made radio, television, and motion picture appearances. Fredericks also performed throughout New Jersey, in Chicago, Minneapolis , Detroit and Dearborn, Kansas City, Tucson, and many cities in California, and toured to Canada, Mexico, and Central and South America. During his travels throughout the United States he performed programs of sacred music at many churches and seminaries. Fredericks's operatic repertoire of over 30 roles included Lt. Pinkerton in Puccini's Madama Butterfly, Pollione in Bellini's Norma, Cassio in Verdi's Otello, Canio in Leoncavallo's Pagliacci, Ismaele in Verdi's Nabucco, Alfredo in Verdi's La traviata, Don Jose in Bizet's Carmen, Manrico in Verdi's Il trovatore, and Avito in Montemezzi's L'amore dei tre re. Fredericks started the annual Christmas Carolfest on the Music Pier in Ocean City, New Jersey, in the mid-1970s and directed it for several years until his death.
