= Mary Curtis Verna =

American opera singer

- Maria (Mary) Curtis as Desdemona in Otello, Teatro alla Scala, Milan, 1953-1954
- Born: Mary Virginia Curtis
- Occupation: soprano opera singer

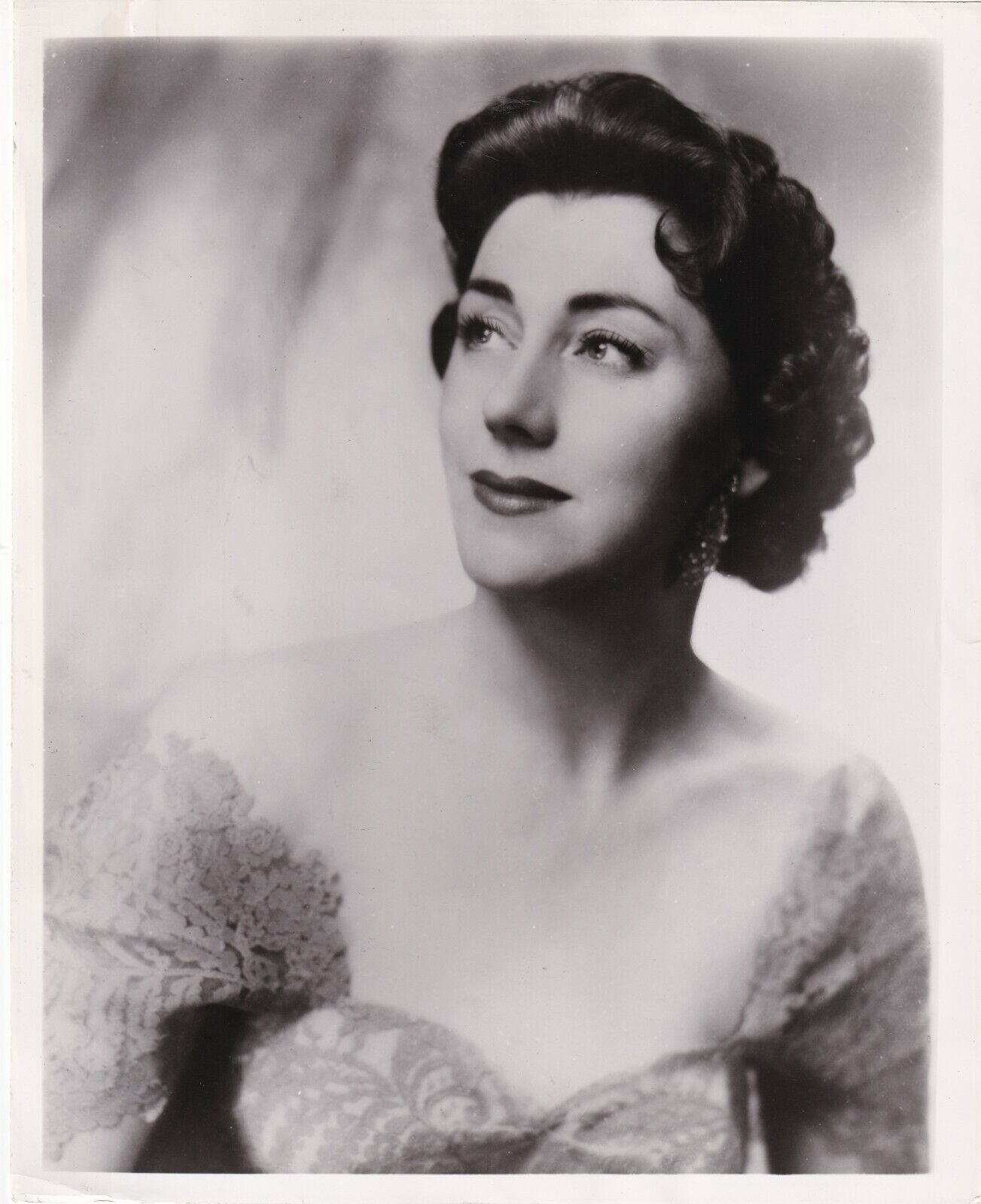
Mary Curtis Verna headshot, c. 1960

Mary Virginia Curtis-Verna (May 9, 1921 – December 4, 2009) was an American operatic soprano, particularly associated with the Italian repertory.

Born in Salem, Massachusetts, she studied at Abbot Academy and Hollins College. She continued her education at the Juilliard School where she studied with Hardesty Johnson. After graduating from Juilliard, at the recommendation of mezzo-soprano Martha Lipton, she began studying with Ettore Verna (whom she later married).

With Verna's intervention, she made her operatic debut at the Teatro Lirico in Milan, as Desdemona, in 1949. In 1950, she appeared on the Ed Sullivan Show singing "Vissi d'arte" from Tosca and "Will You Remember?" from Maytime. During her early years, she sang widely in Italy, as Maria Curtis-Verna, and made guest appearances at the Vienna State Opera and the Munich State Opera.

Curtis-Verna made her American debut at the Academy of Music in Philadelphia with the Philadelphia Civic Grand Opera Company on May 14, 1952, in the title role of Giuseppe Verdi's Aida with Ramón Vinay as Radamès, Claramae Turner as Amneris, and Giuseppe Bamboschek conducting. Later that year she appeared in the same role for her debut with the San Francisco Opera. She made her first appearance at the New York City Opera, as Donna Anna, in 1954, and also sang Aida and Tosca with the company. On August 3, 1954, she married her teacher Ettore Verna in Switzerland.

In 1957, Curtis-Verna made her debut at the Metropolitan Opera as Leonora in Il Trovatore, singing there for 10 seasons. Her other roles at the Met included Aida, Leonora (La forza del destino), Elisabetta (Don Carlo), Santuzza (Cavalleria rusticana), Tosca and Turandot. She portrayed Amelia in a new production of Simon Boccanegra opposite Leonard Warren in his final complete opera appearance at the Metropolitan. She appeared as both Donna Anna and Donna Elvira in Don Giovanni, and she appeared in Götterdämmerung doubling as both the Third Norn and Gutrune.

During her tenure at the Metropolitan Opera, Curtis-Verna became well-known and acclaimed for filling in for indisposed divas, often on only a few hours notice.

Curtis-Verna made guest appearances with several other American opera companies, including Cincinnati and Baltimore. In 1962, she sang with the Philadelphia Lyric Opera in Manon Lescaut, conducted by Julius Rudel and in 1964, La Gioconda opposite Franco Corelli and conducted by Anton Guadagno. She also performed in three New York Philharmonic summer stadium concerts in Lewisohn Stadium, in 1959, 1960, and 1963, singing selections from Verdi and Puccini operas. She sang with South American opera companies, including the Teatro Colón in Buenos Aires. In 1958 she made her sole appearances as Norma at the ancient Fourvière Arena in Lyon, opposite Mario del Monaco and Giulietta Simionato.

Curtis-Verna made comparatively few commercial recordings, including Aida for Remington; she recorded Don Giovanni, Un ballo in maschera, Aida and an operatic recital album for Cetra Records in Italy. For the Metropolitan Opera Record Club (issued by the Book-of-the-Month Club) she recorded Il Trovatore and Andrea Chenier. Later, several live Metropolitan Opera recordings were issued including Tosca, Don Carlo, and two recordings of Aida, as well as Macbeth in Cincinnati, and La Gioconda in Philadelphia. Several live pirate recordings survive, among these fragments of Metropolitan Opera performances of Turandot, and of her single house performance of Adriana Lecouvreur, both opposite Franco Corelli.

Curtis-Verna left the Metropolitan Opera in 1966; her final appearance was in the gala closing night performance at the old house. In 1969, she accepted the position of Head of the Voice Department at the University of Washington School of Music. That same year, she gave one of her final operatic performances in Turandot with the Seattle Opera, alternating with Birgit Nilsson in the title role. She retired from the University of Washington in 1991.

Curtis-Verna died at her home in Seattle, Washington on December 4, 2009, at the age of 88.

== Sources ==
- Operissimo.com
