= Carlo Moresco =

American conductor, musician, and stage director

Carlo Moresco (20 May 1905 – 3 May 1990) was an American conductor, composer, violinist, and stage director of Italian birth. He was one of the most important opera conductors in the city of Philadelphia during the 20th century, working for multiple opera companies in that city. He also held conducting posts with companies in Connecticut and at the Tulsa Opera.

== Early life and career ==
Born in Genoa, Moresco began his conducting career in Italy. He came to the United States in 1947 following the end of World War II when Fortune Gallo recruited him to become music director of his touring San Carlo Opera Company. He toured with that company up until at least 1955 when the last known performances of the SCOC were given.

== Career in Philadelphia and Connecticut ==
While working for the SCOC, Morosco began a long career as one of Philadelphia's most important conductors. He served as the music director for the Philadelphia La Scala Opera Company from 1950-1954 and then served as interim music director of the Philadelphia Grand Opera Company (PGOC) in 1956-1957. He worked on the conducting staff of the Philadelphia Lyric Opera Company from 1958–1961, before returning to the PGOC's conducting staff as music director in 1961. He was the PGOC's main conductor for the next 14 years, notably serving as Artistic Director from 1973-1975. He then worked on the conducting staff of the Opera Company of Philadelphia from 1975-1977.

In 1956 Moresco was appointed music director of the Connecticut Opera. He had previously worked with the company as a guest conductor as early as 1952. Even after resigning as director, he remained active conducting for the company through 1975. With the CO he notably conducted Magda Olivero in her first performance in the United States as the title heroine in Francesco Cilea's Adriana Lecouvreur at the Connecticut Opera on 18 October 1969. He was later the music director of the Connecticut Grand Opera during the 1979-1980 season.

== Other activities ==
Moresco was conductor for New York's Richmond Opera, a short-lived Statten Island-based opera company that was active during the late 1950s. With that company he notably led Eileen Farrell in her first performance in a staged opera production in NYC at the St. George Theatre to an audience of roughly 3,000 people. The young soprano gave a highly lauded portrayal of Leonora in Giuseppe Verdi's Il trovatore to the Manrico of Giovanni Consiglio and Azucena of Margery Mayer. In 1960 he conducted performances of Aida and La bohème at the Cincinnati Opera. In 1962, he led Herva Nelli in her Farewell, in Norma, at the Brooklyn Opera Company. For the Toledo Opera he led productions of Rigoletto (1982) and Madama Butterfly (1983).
