= Frank Guarrera =

American operatic singer (1923–2007)

- Guarrera (1950s photo with dedication)
- Occupation: opera singer

Frank Guarrera (December 3, 1923 – November 23, 2007) was an Italian-American lyric baritone who enjoyed a long and distinguished career at the Metropolitan Opera, singing with the company for a total of 680 performances. He performed 35 different roles at the Met, mostly from the Italian and French repertories, from 1948 through 1976. His most frequent assignments at the house were as Escamillo in Georges Bizet's Carmen, Marcello in Giacomo Puccini's La Bohème, Valentin in Charles Gounod's Faust, and Ping in Puccini's Turandot. He was also an admired interpreter of Mozart roles, establishing himself in the parts of both Guglielmo and Don Alfonso in Così fan tutte and Count Almaviva in Le nozze di Figaro. Most of the roles he portrayed were from the lyric repertoire, such as the title role in Tchaikovsky's Eugene Onegin, but he also sang some heavier roles at the Met like Amonasro in Aïda, Jack Rance in La fanciulla del West and Il conte di Luna in Il trovatore.

He sang at the Met during a "golden age of baritones" whose members also included Robert Weede, Tito Gobbi, Cornell MacNeil, Sherrill Milnes and Anselmo Colzani. The Times said that "Frank Guarrera was a rare all-rounder, a singer whose competence, versatility, intelligence, good stage presence and the absence of inflated ideas of his own importance made him a valued colleague and the kind of stalwart company member that opera managers dream about."

== Early life and career ==
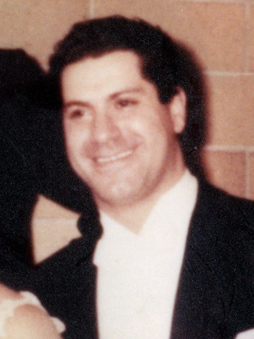
Guarrera at the Metropolitan Opera in the 1950s

Frank Guarrera was born in Philadelphia to parents of Sicilian origin. He was first exposed to opera at the Victor Café in South Philadelphia, and his earliest performance experiences were made with his high school's choir. He began his musical studies at the Curtis Institute of Music in his native city, where he was a pupil of Richard Bonelli and Eufemia Giannini-Gregory. He spent two years serving in the United States Navy during World War II, and then returned to the Curtis Institute to complete his studies.

Guarrera made his professional debut as Silvio in I Pagliacci, at the New York City Opera in 1947. That same year he appeared at the Tanglewood Music Festival as the voice of the Oracle of Neptune in Mozart's Idomeneo. Shortly after, he won the Metropolitan Opera's Auditions of the Air which led to his being offered a Met contract by then general manager Edward Johnson. The competition win also brought him to the attention of conductor Arturo Toscanini, who invited Guarrera to make his La Scala debut as Fanuel in Arrigo Boito's Nerone in 1948. Guarrerra said of the experience of singing Nerone for the first time,

For all I knew, it could have been by Beethoven. I was taken to Toscanini's studio at NBC. That was Studio 8H, the famous one, and of course his dressing room was like a huge apartment. We walked into this gorgeous living room with a grand piano, and there he was, this little guy, with his pince-nez glasses. After some small talk in Italian, he put his hand on my shoulder and asked me to sing. So I unbuttoned my collar -- I had no fear whatsoever -- and I sang. Later, Toscanini's son, Walter, spoke to me. "Well, Mr. Guarrera, my dad would like to invite you to sing at La Scala. Will you be able to make it? Are you busy?" And that's how I made my debut in Milan. I sang the last two acts of Nerone, fully staged, under Toscanini, in a program that opened with the Mefistofele prologue. The bass playing the devil was a young man named Cesare Siepi. Little did I know that someone recorded that performance. But this thing exists, and if you play it at the right speed, it's not bad.

Following Nerone, Guarrera sang in two more productions at La Scala in 1948, Zurga in a new production of Les Pêcheurs de Perles with Onelia Fineschi, and Manfredo in L'amore dei tre re with Clara Petrella and Nicola Rossi-Lemeni.

== Singing at the Met ==
Guarrera made his Met debut on December 14, 1948, as Escamillo in Bizet's Carmen with Risë Stevens in the title role, Ramon Vinay as Don José, Licia Albanese as Micaela, and Wilfred Pelletier conducting. That role became one of his signature roles at the Met; he sang the role a total of 83 times for the company over the next twenty three years, including the premiere of Tyrone Guthrie's critically acclaimed 1952 staging of the opera. His other signature Met roles included Count Almaviva in Le nozze di Figaro, Falke in Die Fledermaus, Figaro in Il barbiere di Siviglia, Ford in Falstaff (which he recorded with Toscanini in 1950), Marcello in La Bohème, and Valentin in Faust.

Guarrera sang at the Met for 28 consecutive seasons and was featured in many successful new stagings made during the tenure of General Director Rudolf Bing. Some of his more notable portrayals were Guglielmo in the first performances of Alfred Lunt's staging of Mozart's Così Fan Tutte (1951); Malatesta in Dino Yannopoulos's staging of Gaetano Donizetti's Don Pasquale (1955) with conductor Thomas Schippers in his Met debut; Belcore in Nathaniel Merrill's new staging of Donizetti's L'elisir d'amore (1960); Ping in Yoshio Aoyama's staging of Turandot (1961); Lescaut in Günther Rennert staging of Jules Massenet's Manon with Anna Moffo in the title role; and Alfio in Franco Zeffirelli's critically acclaimed 1970 staging of Cavalleria rusticana with conductor Leonard Bernstein.

In 1960 Guarrera had a significant personal triumph at the Met when he stepped into the title role of Verdi's Simon Boccanegra after the death of Leonard Warren. He said of the experience, "I was the cover, and I was it. I had barely learned the part. I got the phone call at my house from Rudolf Bing. The costumes were a little big for me, but I said not to worry. Fold everything up in the back and put in pins. I used one of my capes from Ernani to cover everything. That was a night to remember." Some of Guarrera's other Met roles included: Amonasro in Aida, Enrico in Lucia di Lammermoor, Germont in La traviata, Malatesta in Don Pasquale, and the title role in Rigoletto. His last performance in a staged opera at the Met was in the title role of Gianni Schicchi in a new staging by Fabrizio Melano on May 8, 1976.

== Other career highlights ==
Guarrera was also a regular performer at the San Francisco Opera during the 1950s and 1960s. He made his debut with the company as Amonasro to Herva Nelli's Aida on November 1, 1952. His other roles with the company included, Count di Luna (1952), Tonio (1952), Escamillo (1953, 1959, 1966), Rossini's Figaro (1953), Marcello (1954, 1958), Lord Henry Ashton to Mado Robin's Lucia in Lucia di Lammermoor (1954), Ping (1954), Guglielmo (1956, 1960), Ford (1956, 1966), Sharpless in Puccini's Madama Butterfly (1956), Lescaut in Puccini's Manon Lescaut (1956), various roles in Carmina Burana (1958–1959), Rodrigo in Don Carlo (1958), Manfredo (1959), Silvio (1959), and Rigoletto (1966). He returned to the house after an eight-year absence in 1974. His final performance at the SFO was on November 30, 1974, as Sharpless to Pilar Lorengar's Butterfly and Barry Morell's Pinkerton.

Guarrera also appeared frequently in Chicago and Los Angeles and made opera appearances in London and Paris.

== Later life and career ==
Following his retirement from the stage, Guarrera joined the voice faculty at the University of Washington in Seattle through the invitation of former Met colleague Mary Curtis Verna, who was then chair of the university's voice department. He taught at the school from 1980 to 1990, with his most successful students being tenor Timothy Mussard and baritone Mel Ulrich. He quit teaching when his wife Adelina suffered a massive stroke, serving as her primary caretaker until her death in 2000. The couple returned to Philadelphia for their final years together and Guarrera remained in the area for the rest of his life. He and his wife had two children together, Dennis and Valerie. He died at his home in Bellmawr, New Jersey, on November 23, 2007, ten days before his 84th birthday. The cause of death was complications from diabetes.

== Recordings ==
Guarrera is featured on complete opera recordings, including Così fan tutte, Lucia di Lammermoor, opposite Lily Pons, Faust, Ford in Falstaff under Toscanini, and Cavalleria rusticana. He can also be heard on several live broadcasts from the Met, as well as some of the sets issued by the Metropolitan Opera Record Club.

== Awards and honors ==
Frank Guarrera is honored with a mural painted by Peter Pagast at Broad and Tasker Streets in Philadelphia. The mural, painted in 2003, features Guarrera in several of his famous opera roles, including The Barber of Seville and Escamillo, the bullfighter, in Carmen.

== Sources ==
- D. Hamilton (ed.),The Metropolitan Opera Encyclopedia: A Complete Guide to the World of Opera (Simon and Schuster, New York 1987). ISBN 0-671-61732-X
- The Metropolitan Opera Guide to Recorded Opera, edited by Paul Gruber - ISBN 978-0-393-03444-8
- M.G.Genesi,"Anna Moffo:une carriére italo-américaine"(Borgonovo V. T. di Piacenza, Edizioni Orione, 2002, 496 pages)
