= Barry Morell =

American opera singer

- Born: March 30, 1927; New York City, United States
- Died: December 4, 2003 (aged 76); Sandwich, Massachusetts
- Education: The Juilliard School
- Occupation: Operatic tenor
- Organizations: Metropolitan Opera

Barry Morell (March 30, 1927 – December 4, 2003) was an American operatic tenor, particularly associated with the Italian and French repertoire.

He was born in New York City, and studied at The Juilliard School with Giuseppe Danise. He made his debut as Pinkerton in Puccini's Madama Butterfly at the New York City Opera in 1955, and again as Pinkerton, at the Metropolitan Opera in 1958 (opposite Victoria de los Ángeles, conducted by Erich Leinsdorf), where he was to sing regularly until 1979, mostly in lyric roles such as Edgardo, Macduff, Duke of Mantua, Alfredo, Rodolfo, Faust, Hoffmann, Turiddu, Lensky, and Matteo.

He also sang regularly at the Lyric Opera of Chicago and the San Francisco Opera, and in 1968, began appearing abroad, notably in Rome, Barcelona, London, Berlin, Vienna, Buenos Aires, and Santiago, Chile.

In the 1970s, as his voice darkened and widened, he successfully moved to heavier roles such as Riccardo, Alvaro, Enzo, and Cavaradossi.

Morell retired from the stage in the mid 1980s. He died in Sandwich, Massachusetts, at the age of 76.

== Sources ==
- Forbes, Elizabeth, "Barry Morell, Operatic tenor", The Independent, 10 December 2003
- Hamilton, David (ed.), "Morell, Barry", The Metropolitan Opera Encyclopedia, Simon and Schuster, 1987, p. 235
- Opera News, Obituaries, February 2004.
