= Kurt Baum =

American opera singer

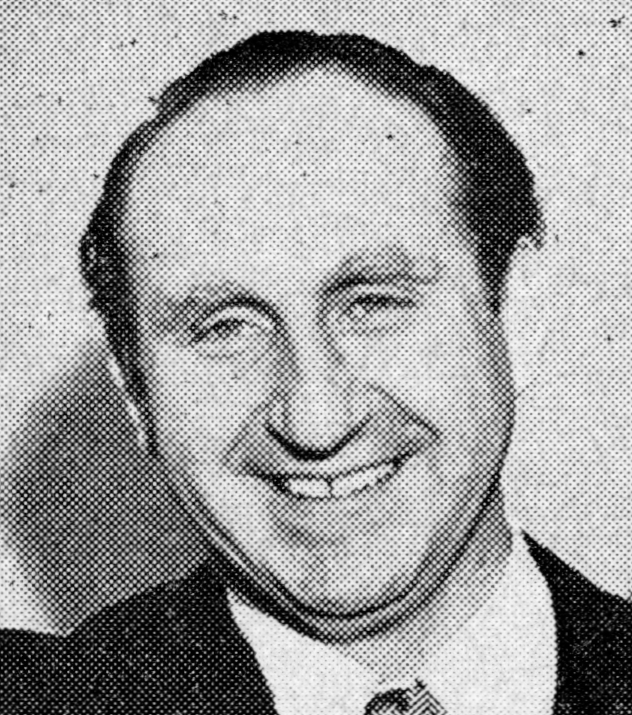
Baum c. 1944

Kurt Baum (March 15, 1900 – December 27, 1989) was an Austria-Hungary born American operatic tenor. He is best remembered for his 25 seasons spent with the Metropolitan Opera, between 1941 and 1966.

== Life and career ==
Kurt Baum (photo autographed in 1949)

Kurt Baum (photo autographed in 1949)

Born ethnic German-Jewish in Cologne on March 15, 1900, Kurt Baum attended high school in Cologne, Germany where his father did business and attended medical school at the University of Prague. Robust and athletic, Baum was at one time the amateur heavyweight boxing champion of Czechoslovakia and member of Max Schmeling's Sports Club in Cologne.

Baum never considered a career in music until a friend urged him to study music after hearing him sing a German drinking song at a party. In 1933, he dropped out of medical school and began attending the Music Academy of Berlin where he studied for less than a year. In 1933 Baum won first prize at the Vienna International Singing Competition, and his operatic début came in the same year in Zurich in Zemlinsky's Der Kreidekreis. Baum spent his early year performing lyric roles at Zurich and dramatic roles at Deutsches Theater, and after furthering his studies with Edoardo Garbin in Milan and the faculty of Accademia Nazionale di Santa Cecilia he toured the major theatres of Europe including Paris, Vienna, Budapest, Monte Carlo, and Salzburg. In 1939, Baum escaped the war threatening Czechoslovakia by migrating to Paris, and accepted a 3-year contract with the Chicago Lyric Opera. He made his debut there as Radames in Verdi's Aida.

Baum's debut with the Metropolitan Opera, which became his artistic home, came in November 1941 as the Italian singer in Der Rosenkavalier. Baum's roaring spinto voice easily reach the high-D flat in the Rosenkavalier Italian singer aria, in which he had express permission (via a letter) from the composer to interpolate the note. He appeared in his first major role at the Met, Don Alvaro, in January 1943. In 1952, Baum performed Radames in London at the behest of Queen Elizabeth II shortly after her coronation. Baum remained on the Met's full-time roster until the 1965–1966 season, appearing there for the last time as Radames at the Old Met's Farewell Gala in April 1966. His repertoire included cornerstone spinto roles such as Don Alvaro, Radames, Cavaradossi, Manrico, Lohengrin, Walther von Stolzing, Don José, Canio, Samson, Des Grieux, Turiddu, Enzo, Pollione, and Andrea Chénier, which he played beside such illustrious colleagues such as Maria Callas, Renata Tebaldi, Zinka Milanov, Eleanor Steber and Risë Stevens. He won renown especially for his heroic voice, which can otherwise turn metallic over a performance, reliable technique and an amazing top register, which was lauded for its strength and virility.

Baum became an American citizen and spent later years in New York City, where after the death of his wife he could often be found walking his dog around Central Park. He also wrote several treatises on preservation of the voice and singing well in old age. Baum died in New York on December 27, 1989 due to unspecified causes, leaving no immediate survivors.

Recordings include the Lohengrin Bridal scene with Helen Traubel from 1945 which finds him in an ardent, heroic mood, underpinned by his characteristically strident technique. Several of his live performances as Pollione, Radames and Manrico beside Maria Callas in their 1950 Mexico tour were especially noted for the high degree of excitement generated, though he never sang at anything less than full volume.
