= Richard Tucker =

American opera singer (1913–1975)

- Tucker in costume for Andrea Chénier, with Mario Lanza (right), who was a great fan of Tucker's, after Tucker's 1958 Covent Garden debut. This was their only meeting.

Background information
- Born: Rivn Ticker; August 28, 1913; Brooklyn, New York, U.S.
- Died: January 8, 1975 (aged 61) Kalamazoo, Michigan, U.S.
- Cause of death: Heart attack
- Genres: Opera, Jewish music (Cantorial)
- Occupations: Operatic tenor, Cantor
- Years active: 1945–1975 (Opera career)
- Labels: Columbia Records, RCA Victor
- Spouse: Sara Perelmuth (m. 1936)

Richard Tucker (August 28, 1913 – January 8, 1975) was an American operatic tenor and cantor. Long associated with the Metropolitan Opera, Tucker's career was primarily centered in the United States.

== Early life ==
Richard Tucker (photo with dedication)

Tucker was born Rivn (Rubin) Ticker in Brooklyn, New York, the youngest of five surviving children of Bessarabian Jewish parents who immigrated to the US in 1911. His father, Ysruel (Sam) Ticker, and mother Fanya-Tsipa (Fanny) Ticker resisted using the anglicized "Tucker" their children adopted, but by the time their youngest son entered first grade, he was registered under the surname Tucker. His musical aptitude was discovered early, and was nurtured under the tutelage of Samuel Weisser at the Tifereth Israel synagogue in Lower Manhattan. As a teenager, Tucker's interests alternated between athletics, at which he excelled during his school years, and singing for weddings and bar mitzvahs as a cantorial student. Eventually, he progressed from a part-time cantor at Temple Emanuel in Passaic, New Jersey, to full-time cantorships at Temple Adath Israel in the Bronx and, in June 1943, at the large and prestigious Brooklyn Jewish Center. Until then, Tucker's income derived mainly from his weekly commissions as a salesman for the Reliable Silk Company in Manhattan's garment district.

On February 11, 1936, Tucker married Sara Perelmuth, the youngest child (and only daughter) of Levi and Anna Perelmuth, proprietors of the Grand Mansion, a kosher banquet hall in Manhattan's Lower East Side. At the time of Tucker's wedding to their daughter, the Perelmuths' musically gifted eldest son, Yakob, had progressed from a part-time jazz violinist and lyric tenor vocalist to a national radio star who had already set his sights on an operatic career. Under the management of Sol Hurok, the eldest of the Perelmuth offspring, now renamed Jan Peerce, reached his goal when the general manager of the Metropolitan Opera Company, Edward Johnson, offered him a contract after an impressive audition. When Peerce made his much-acclaimed debut at the Met on November 29, 1941, his sister and her new husband were living with Peerce's parents.

== Operatic career ==
Although Peerce remained skeptical of Tucker's singing talent and did not overtly encourage his operatic ambitions (which was one cause of an unfortunate rift between the two brothers-in-law and their families, which apparently was never completely healed), Peerce did play a role in introducing Tucker to conductor and arranger Zavel Zilberts, who coached Tucker until he came to the attention of Paul Althouse, a notable tenor whose long operatic career had begun during the reign of Enrico Caruso at the Met. Althouse became Tucker's only teacher. Contrary to his teacher's advice, Tucker entered the Metropolitan Opera's "Auditions of the Air" in 1943, but did not win. When Met general manager Edward Johnson came unannounced to the Brooklyn Jewish Center to hear Tucker sing, however, Johnson offered the tenor another audition and soon awarded him a contract. On January 25, 1945, under the baton of Emil Cooper, Tucker made his debut as Enzo Grimaldo in La Gioconda. This debut, one of the most successful in the annals of the Met, heralded Tucker's 30-year career as the leading American tenor of the Met's postwar era.

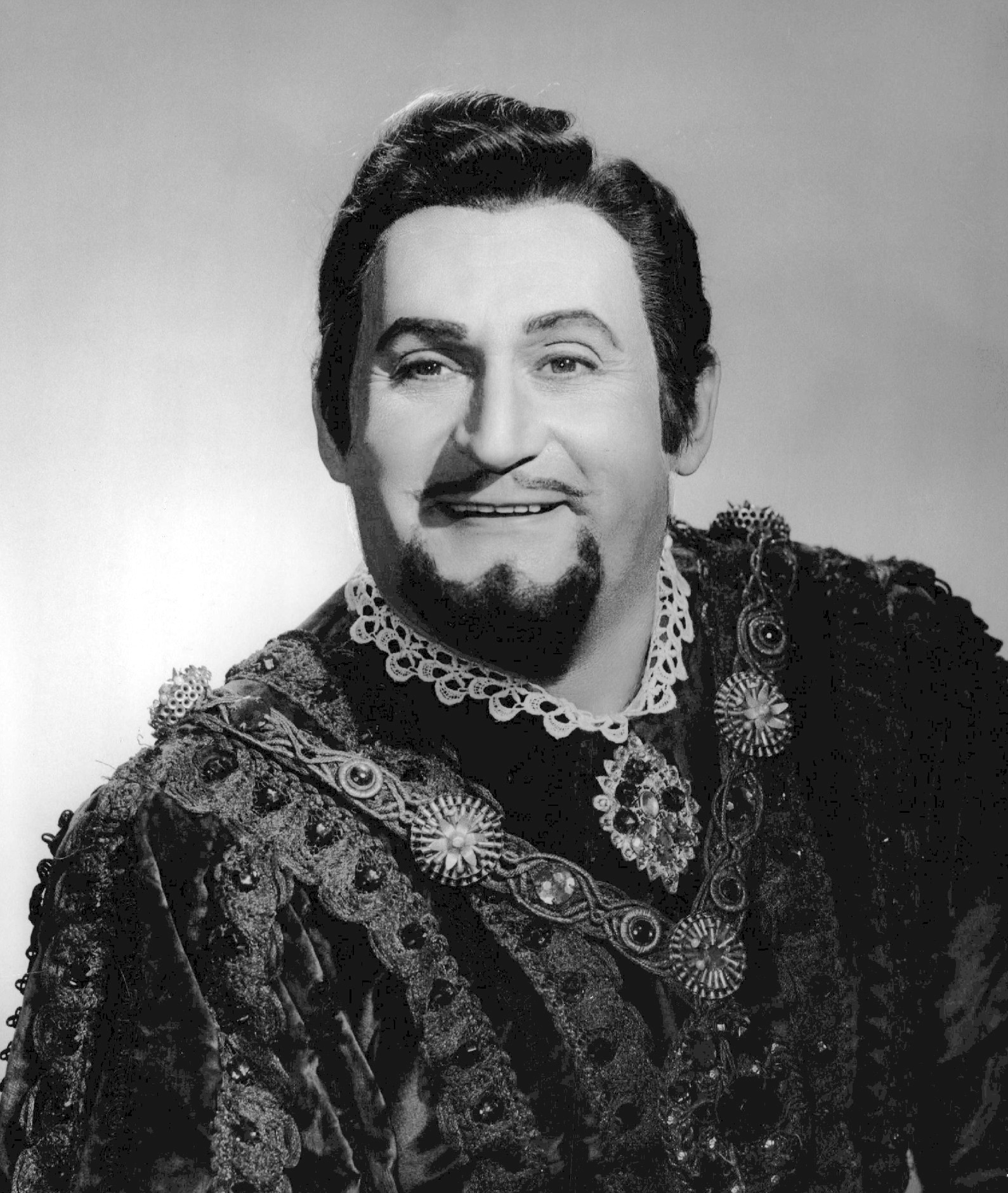
As the Duke in Rigoletto, 1971. External audio: You may hear Richard Tucker with Fausto Cleva conducting the Columbia Symphony Orchestra in popular arias from Giacomo Puccini's operas in 1959; Here on archive.org; You may hear Richard Tucker performing Verdi's "La Traviata" with Robert Merrill, Anna Moffo and the Rome Opera Orchestra conducted by Fernando Previtali in 1961; Here on Archive.org

Two years after his Metropolitan debut, Tucker was invited to reprise his success in La Gioconda at the amphitheater in Verona, Italy, for which the retired tenor and Verona native, Giovanni Zenatello, had also engaged the young Maria Callas. Two years later, in 1949, Tucker's rapidly ascending career was confirmed when Arturo Toscanini engaged Tucker to sing the role of Radames for the NBC broadcasts of a complete concert performance of Aida opposite Herva Nelli in the title role, an event heard and seen on radio and television, and eventually released on LP, CD, VHS, and DVD. This was one of the first complete opera performances ever broadcast on national television.

In the ensuing years, Tucker's vocal style evolved into a lirico-spinto voice. If his signature stylistic devices, especially his affection for Italianate sobs, were not always lauded by the critics, his technique, diction, and pronunciation were acclaimed. “For me, Richard Tucker was, and always will be, an ‘Italian’ tenor,” Luciano Pavarotti wrote in the foreword to the authorized biography by James A. Drake. “Like Jussi Bjoerling, he proved that one does not have to be Italian-born in order to win the critics and public.” A profusion of legendary tenors including Jussi Björling, Giuseppe Di Stefano, Mario Del Monaco (and, eventually, Jan Peerce) came and went during the tenure of Rudolf Bing as general manager of the Metropolitan. Tucker remained a dominant tenor in the industry and continued to take on new challenges. Although seen as an unremarkable actor throughout most of his career, Tucker made a strong impression with veteran critics when he reconceived the role of Canio in Pagliacci under the direction of Franco Zeffirelli in January 1970. The tenor was nearly 60 years old at the time.

Before and after each Metropolitan Opera season, Tucker appeared in concert throughout the U.S. In the late 1950s and early 1960s, Tucker frequently appeared in a series of well attended open-air concerts at Lewisohn Stadium in New York City, under the direction of Alfredo Antonini.

Throughout his opera career, Tucker maintained a Jewish identity. He kept a kosher home, and regularly officiated as a cantor on Rosh Hashana, Yom Kippur and other sacred events in the Jewish liturgical calendar, especially in Chicago. He oversaw the religious development of his three sons, Berel (Barry, born 1938); David N. Tucker, M.D. (born 1941); and Henry (born 1946). Their father arranged for them to sing with him on a popular television program hosted by Sam Levenson, 9 March 1952.

Tucker had a long-running contract with Columbia Records, and eventually recorded for EMI and RCA Victor as well. However, measured against the length and prominence of his career, Tucker's commercial recordings are comparatively few, and they inadequately document his voice in its prime, according to many of his artistic colleagues. He never, for example, made studio recordings of such important roles for him as those in Andrea Chénier, Un Ballo in Maschera, Carmen, Les Contes d'Hoffmann, La Gioconda, Lucia di Lammermoor, Luisa Miller, Pagliacci, Rigoletto, Simon Boccanegra and Tosca. (He can be heard in performances of all these on Met Opera on Demand.) However, his RCA recordings with soprano Leontyne Price (especially Madama Butterfly and La forza del destino) invariably show him in fine ringing voice and with a convincing dramatic presence. He also made a famous recording of Aida with a colleague from his Verona debut, Maria Callas, and he recorded the Verdi Requiem with George London under Eugene Ormandy. Many of his commercial recordings, as well as private recordings of his concerts and broadcast performances, have been digitally remastered and are available in CD and online downloadable formats. A number of his national television appearances on "The Voice of Firestone" and "The Bell Telephone Hour" were preserved in kinescope and videotape form, and have been reissued in VHS and DVD format. A complete video performance of the tenor's portrayal of Canio in the Zeffirelli production of Pagliacci, which was to be paired with Cavalleria rusticana featuring Tucker's friend and tenor colleague Franco Corelli as Turiddu, was never telecast and has not been issued commercially, for legal reasons.

Although Tucker's well-crafted public image was that of a competitive, overwhelmingly self-confident performer, his offstage demeanor was that of an inherently private but unfailingly considerate man, especially where fans and colleagues were concerned. Never prone to looking back upon his career, Tucker always lived in the moment and maintained a boyish outlook on life He also displayed a propensity for playing pranks on some of his fellow singers, often provoking a smile at some inappropriate moment in a performance. Once, during a broadcast of La forza del destino with baritone Robert Merrill, Tucker sneaked a nude photograph into a small trunk that Merrill opened onstage. In later years, Merrill described his tenor friend as "an original, right out of the pages of a Damon Runyon story".

== Death ==
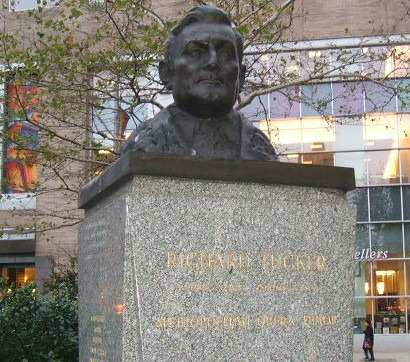
Richard Tucker monument in Lincoln Square, Manhattan External audio: Tucker with Licia Albanese and Alfredo Antonini at Lewisohn Stadium--- All-Puccini program (1959) Here on WQXR radio; Tucker sings "Songs From Sunny Italy" with Alfredo Antonini conducting the Columbia Concert Orchestra in 1950 Here on Archive.org; "Richard Tucker Sings Arias From Ten Verdi Operas" with the Orchester Der Wiener Staatscoper conducted by Nello Santi in 1965 Here on archive.org

On January 8, 1975, Tucker died unexpectedly from a heart attack at age 61 in his hotel room in Kalamazoo, Michigan; he was on a national concert tour with his close friend, baritone Robert Merrill. His funeral was held on January 10 on the stage of the Metropolitan Opera House, the only singer in the history of the company ever to be so honored.

== Legacy ==
Shortly after his death, the Richard Tucker Music Foundation was established by his widow, sons, colleagues, and friends, "to perpetuate the memory of America's greatest tenor through projects in aid of gifted young singers." In the intervening decades, the Richard Tucker Foundation, whose annual televised concerts have been hosted by Luciano Pavarotti and others, has consistently awarded the largest vocal-music grants and scholarships. Recipients, the first of whom was Rockwell Blake, include sopranos Renée Fleming, Deborah Voigt, mezzo-soprano Isabel Leonard, tenors Richard Leech, Stephen Costello, James Valenti, Michael Fabiano and other opera singers of international renown.

In tribute to his legacy at the Met, the city of New York designated the park adjacent to Lincoln Center as Richard Tucker Square.
