= David Morelock =

American stage director (1931–2026)

David Morelock (July 16, 1931 – May 13, 2026) was an American stage director of opera.

== Life and career ==
An erstwhile teacher of French, his career was focused on the New Orleans Opera Association, where, following a brief career as a singer, he staged his first opera, Les pêcheurs de perles, in 1971. The ensuing decades saw his "traditional" stagings of Ariadne auf Naxos (with Claire Watson), Lohengrin (with William Cochran), Manon Lescaut (with Nancy Shade and Harry Theyard), Macbeth (with Sherrill Milnes), La favorite, La traviata (with Karan Armstrong), Ernani, Faust (with Luis Lima), Salome, Macbeth again (now with Marisa Galvany), Carmen (with Shirley Verrett), Fidelio, Un ballo in maschera (with Carlo Bergonzi), Samson et Dalila, Il barbiere di Siviglia, Hänsel und Gretel, Lucia di Lammermoor, Otello, Tosca (with Sylvia Sass and Justino Díaz), Aida (with Natalia Rom), Le nozze di Figaro, Don Carlos, Falstaff (with Louis Quilico), Tannhäuser, Eugene Onegin, Andrea Chénier, Die Fledermaus, Werther, Il trovatore (with Ruth Falcon), Lakmé (with Elizabeth Futral), Der fliegende Holländer (with Greer Grimsley and Phyllis Treigle), Manon, Turandot, Rigoletto, Das Rheingold, Les contes d'Hoffmann (with Paul Groves), La bohème, and, finally, again, Carmen (in 2009).

Elsewhere, he staged Les contes d'Hoffmann for the Connecticut Opera, with Nicolai Gedda in the name part and Susanne Marsee as Nicklausse, conducted by Antonio de Almeida, in 1982. That same year, he staged Carmen for the Seattle Opera, with John Duykers as Don José. While teaching French at Memphis University School, he directed Lucia di Lammermoor (1966), Il trovatore (1967), and Die Fledermaus (1968) for Memphis Opera Theater, now Opera Memphis.

Morelock was also, from 1994 to 2007, director of the Opera Workshop at Loyola University New Orleans.

Morelock died on May 13, 2026, at the age of 94.

== Sources ==
- Program of Tosca, New Orleans Opera Association, 1987.
- "Bravo, Signor Morelock," The Times-Picayune, by Theodore P. Mahne, March 19, 2009.
- https://www.proquest.com/docview/224183976/3B681ACCC3BB4B18PQ/4?sourcetype=Magazines
- https://www.proquest.com/docview/224222286/3B681ACCC3BB4B18PQ/2?sourcetype=Magazines
- https://www.proquest.com/docview/224218009/3B681ACCC3BB4B18PQ/1?sourcetype=Magazines
