= Christopher Keene =

American conductor (1946–1995)

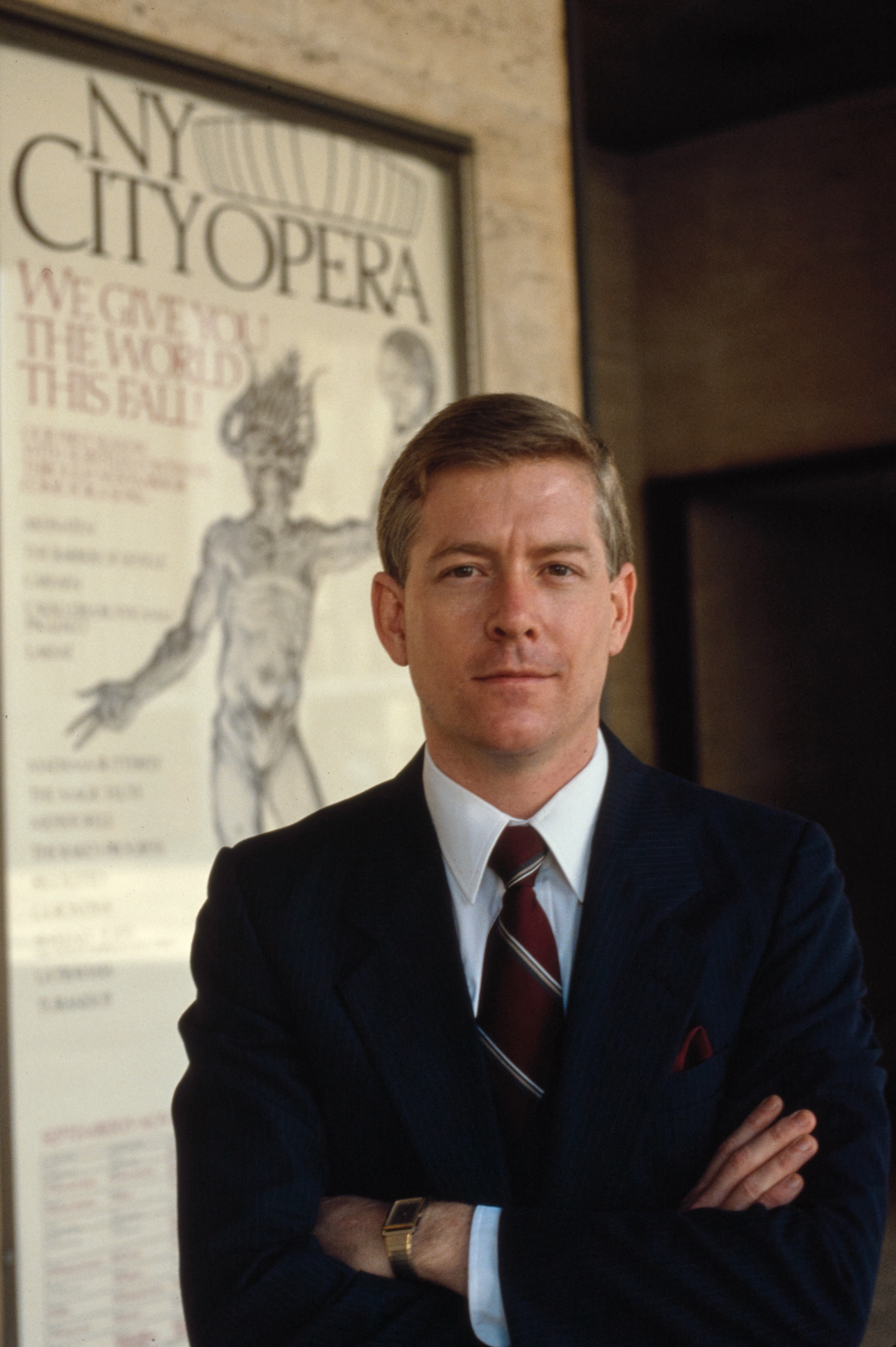
- Keene in 1984
- Born: December 21, 1946; Berkeley, California, U.S.
- Died: October 8, 1995 (aged 48); New York City, U.S.
- Occupation: Conductor
- Spouse: Sara
- Family: Elodie Keene (sister)

Christopher Keene (December 21, 1946 – October 8, 1995) was an American conductor.

== Early life and education ==
Keene was born in 1946 in Berkeley, California, the son of Yvonne (née Cyr) and Jim Keene. His mother was of Acadian, German, and Scottish descent. His parents divorced in 1953 and his mother remarried to Jim San Jule in 1954 until their divorce in 1970. He has three siblings: Philip Keene (born 1941), Elodie Keene (born 1949), and Tamsen (née San Jule) Calhoon (born 1956).

Keene studied the piano and cello in his youth. A highly self motivated student, he organized neighborhood productions of plays and operas while growing up and directed ensembles at his high school while a student. At the University of California, Berkeley he earned a degree in history instead of music; reasoning that he didn't want to waste his time re-learning skills and content he had already mastered.

== Career ==
Keene made his first foray into opera conducting in a 1965 production of Benjamin Britten's The Rape of Lucretia at Berkeley. In 1966 he became assistant conductor at the San Francisco Opera under Kurt Herbert Adler, and served in the same capacity at the San Diego Opera in 1967. At Adler's recommendation, Gian Carlo Menotti hired Keene to conduct The Saint of Bleecker Street at the 1968 Spoleto Festival. He remained associated with the Spoleto Festival for many years, serving as music director there from 1972 to 1976. In 1977 he co-founded the Spoleto Festival USA, where he was Music Director from 1977 to 1980.

From 1969 to 1971 Keene was Music Director of Eliot Feld's American Ballet Company. In 1969 he was honored with the Julius Rudel Award for conducting.

In 1969, Keene joined the staff of the New York City Opera, where he debuted the following year with Ginastera's Don Rodrigo (with Salvador Novoa). He was to conduct a great array of operas at that theatre, including the world premiere of Menotti's The Most Important Man (with Harry Theyard, 1971), as well as La traviata, Le nozze di Figaro (with Michael Devlin in the title role), The Makropoulos Case, Susannah, Tosca (with Marisa Galvany), Beatrix Cenci, Faust, Die Zauberflöte (with Syble Young as the Queen of the Night), L'incoronazione di Poppea, Ariadne auf Naxos, Médée (in the Italian version), I puritani (with Beverly Sills), Salome, A Village Romeo and Juliet, La fanciulla del West, Andrea Chénier, L'amour des trois oranges, The Turn of the Screw (with Phyllis Treigle as Miss Jessel), Jay Reise's Rasputin, Schoenberg's Moses und Aron, Zimmermann's Die Soldaten, and Stewart Wallace's Harvey Milk.

In 1976 Keene conducted the world premiere of Gian Carlo Menotti's The Hero for the Opera Company of Philadelphia. He also conducted at the Metropolitan Opera during a single season, a double-bill of Cavalleria rusticana and Pagliacci (with Teresa Stratas as Nedda) in 1971. From 1974 to 1989, he was music director and conductor at Artpark in Lewiston, New York, and from 1975 to 1984 held the same post at the Syracuse Symphony Orchestra. He was Founder of the Long Island Philharmonic in 1979, and directed it until 1990. In 1976, he led the world premiere of Carlisle Floyd's Bilby's Doll at the Houston Grand Opera.

At the City Opera, Sills named him Music Director from 1982 to 1986, and he succeeded her as General Director in 1989, a position he held until his death. Keene had undergone treatment for alcoholism at the Betty Ford Center, and died of lymphoma resulting from AIDS, at New York Hospital. His last performance, at the City Opera, was of Hindemith's Mathis der Maler.

He was seen over PBS conducting The Consul (1977) and Vanessa (1978) from Spoleto USA, and Frank Corsaro's City Opera productions of Madama Butterfly (1982) and Carmen (1984). Keene's discography includes the first recording of Philip Glass' Satyagraha (for CBS/Sony, 1984), and John Corigliano's score to Ken Russell's film, Altered States (on RCA, 1980). With the Syracuse Symphony, Keene conducted and recorded "The Celestial Hawk", a piano concerto written and performed by Keith Jarrett (on ECM, 1980); the recording was made at Carnegie Hall.

== Death ==
Keene died at New York Hospital from lymphoma caused by complications from AIDS on October 8, 1995.
