= Ticho Parly =

Danish tenor

- Parly, in 1968
- Born: Frederick Christiansen; 16 July 1928; Copenhagen, Denmark
- Died: 21 June 1993 (aged 64); Seattle, US
- Occupation: Heldentenor

Ticho Parly (né Frederick Christiansen) (16 July 1928 – 21 June 1993) was a Danish-born heldentenor who sang leading roles in most of the major opera houses of Europe as well as the United States, including the Metropolitan Opera, where he debuted in 1966 as Tristan opposite Birgit Nilsson in Tristan und Isolde. In his later life he was a voice teacher in Seattle, Washington.

== Biography ==
Frederick Christiansen was born in Copenhagen on 16 July 1928. He began singing as a treble in his homeland, and grew into a bass-baritone. After studying in Denmark, France, Italy and Switzerland, as well as Indiana University, he went to New Orleans, where he resided from 1957 to 1960. There he studied with Charles Paddock (also the teacher of Thaïs St Julien, Anthony Laciura and Greer Grimsley) who "insisted" he become a tenor. In 1958 he made his operatic debut with the New Orleans Opera Association, in the secondary role of Pong in the local premiere of Puccini's Turandot, conducted by Renato Cellini. The next year, he appeared as Flavio in Bellini's Norma, as well as in Eine Nacht in Venedig by Johann Strauss, the latter for The Experimental Opera Theatre of America.

Within a few months Parly was starring in European theatres, including Aachen where he portrayed Radamès in Verdi's Aida. Over the next few seasons, he became acclaimed as one of the world's leading heldentenors, appearing in Brussels in the title role of Offenbach's Les contes d'Hoffmann staged by Maurice Béjart in 1961, at the Wuppertal Opera as Mephisto in Busoni's Doktor Faust and as Britten's Peter Grimes in 1962), in Lisbon as the Emperor in Die Frau ohne Schatten in 1962 and Herodes in Salome in 1975, both by R. Strauss, in Kassel as Wagner's Siegfried in 1962 and Tannhäuser in 1964, conducted by Christoph von Dohnányi, in Amsterdam as Doktor Faust in 1962 and as Prince Chouïsky in Mussorgsky's Boris Godunov in 1989, and in Vienna as Bacchus in Ariadne auf Naxos in 1965, Erik in Wagner's Der fliegende Holländer in 1967, and Einem's Der Besuch der alten Dame in 1973.

In the summer of 1963, he made his debut at the Bayreuth Festival as Kunz Vogelgesang in Wieland Wagner's production of Die Meistersinger von Nürnberg, with Anja Silja as Eva. In 1966 he returned for the leading role of Siegmund in Die Walküre and, two years later, portrayed Siegfried in both Siegfried (which he also sang at the Salzburg Festival, under Herbert von Karajan) and Götterdämmerung. These were his last appearances at Bayreuth.

For the San Francisco Opera, he was seen in Die Frau ohne Schatten, in 1960. In his native Copenhagen, Parly appeared as Florestan in Beethoven's Fidelio, as Erik in 1963, as Tannhäuser in 1964, as Ägisth in Elektra in 1966 and in Boris Godunov in 1988, directed by Harry Kupfer.

In 1965 Parly returned to New Orleans, for Tannhäuser in Tito Capobianco's production. The same year found him in Mexico City for the same opera, now with Montserrat Caballé. In 1966, he recorded Wagner excerpts for Deutsche Grammophon conducted by Peter Maag and made his debut at the Royal Opera House in Siegfried (alongside Hans Hotter, conducted by Georg Solti, where he returned in 1983 to portray Tristan in Wagner's Tristan und Isolde. In 1966, he performed in Fidelio at the Teatro Colón in Buenos Aires, returning for Tristan there.

In the summer of 1968 he made his debut at Bayerische Staatsoper in Tristan und Isolde, but the conductor, Joseph Keilberth, died conducting the second act and the performance was cancelled.

On 3 April 1966 Ticho Parly's wife Azilda gave birth to a daughter, Tina. In November the same year, he made his first appearance at the Metropolitan Opera , as Tristan opposite the Isolde of Birgit Nilsson. Two years later he sang there in Der fliegende Holländer (with Cornell MacNeil) and Elektra (with Nilsson and Jean Madeira). In 1967, Parly made his debut at the La Scala in Milan in Salome, followed by Tannhäuser (1967), and returned in 1971 for the Tambourmajor in Alban Berg's Wozzeck, conducted by Claudio Abbado.

In 1967 he also appeared at the Paris Opéra as Tannhäuser, and the next year as Siegmund. In 1970 he sang in concert performances of the first and third acts of Wagner's Parsifal in Washington, DC, and New York City, with the Washington National Symphony. In 1971, he appeared in Der Besuch der alten Dame with Astrid Varnay in Zürich. The same year he portrayed Siegfried at the Scottish Opera, followed by the title role of Britten's Peter Grimes in 1973. Returning to the US in 1974, he performed as Loge in Das Rheingold at the San Diego Opera conducted by Walter Herbert. Over the next few summers, he sang the same role for the Seattle Opera's production of the Ring cycle. In 1981 he appeared as Loge at the Cincinnati Opera, and the following year as Herodes with Marisa Galvany in her first assumption of Salome. In 1983 he performed as Siegfried, for the Boston Lyric Opera. As late as 1988, the singer appeared in Denmark in the title role of Verdi's Otello.

In his later years, Parly taught voice in Seattle, where he died on 21 June 1993, at the age of 64. The following 7 July, Parly's daughter, Tina, died in a rafting accident on the Yuba River in Northern California. At the time of his death, Parly was married to his second wife, the soprano Patricia Schlosstein.
