= Médée (Cherubini) =

1797 French opera by Cherubini

- Opéra-comique by Luigi Cherubini
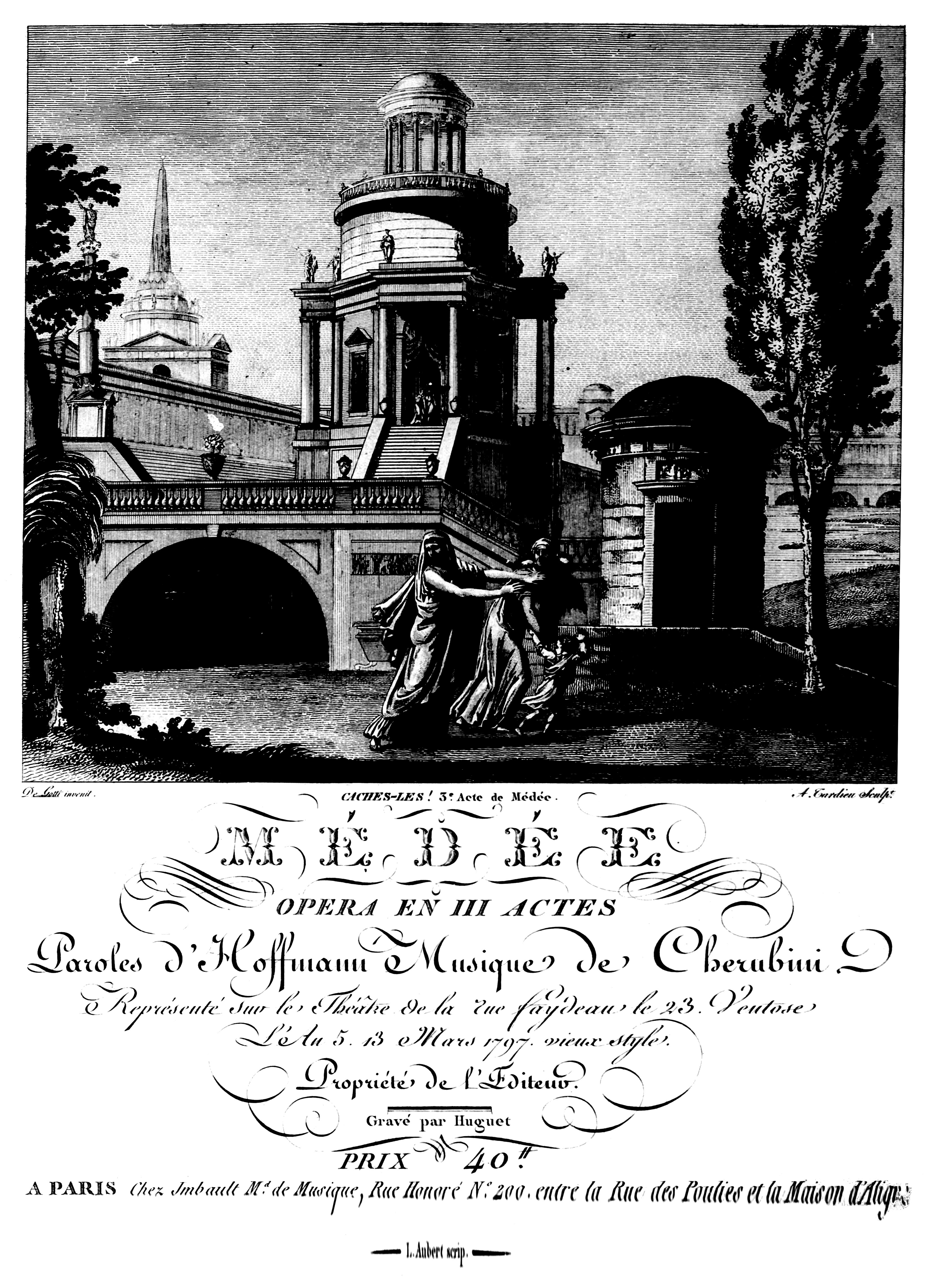
- Title page of the first edition of the score
- Librettist: François-Benoît Hoffmann
- Language: French
- Based on: Medea by Euripides and Médée by Pierre Corneille
- Premiere: 13 March 1797; Théâtre Feydeau, Paris

Médée is a French language opéra-comique by Luigi Cherubini. The libretto by François-Benoît Hoffman (Nicolas Étienne Framéry) was based on Euripides' tragedy of Medea and Pierre Corneille's play Médée. It is set in the ancient city of Corinth.

The opera was premiered on 13 March 1797 at the Théâtre Feydeau, Paris. It met with a lukewarm reception and was not immediately revived. During the twentieth century, it was usually performed in Italian translation as Medea, with the spoken dialogue replaced by recitatives not authorized by the composer. More recently, some performances have used Cherubini's original version.

The long-lost final aria, which Cherubini appears to have elided from his original manuscript, was discovered by researchers from the University of Manchester and Stanford University by employing x-ray techniques to reveal the blackened out areas of Cherubini's manuscript.

== Performances and versions ==
Several versions of the opera were produced and staged in Italian and German:

- 1800: German translation by Karl Alexander Herklots was premiered in Berlin on 17 February 1800
- 1802: Another German translation by Georg Friedrich Treitschke was premiered in Vienna on 6 November 1802.
- 1809: The shortened version of the Treitschke translation was given in Vienna, where Cherubini produced a version which omitted some 500 bars of music
- 1855: Franz Lachner's German version was given in Frankfurt. This was based on the shortened Vienna version, but with recitatives composed by Lachner which replaced the spoken dialogue.
- 1865: The United Kingdom premiere was given in Italian at Her Majesty's Theatre on 6 June, with recitatives by Luigi Arditi, and Thérèse Tietjens in the title role. Cherubini's son and grandson were among the audience. This performance received a highly enthusiastic review in The Times.

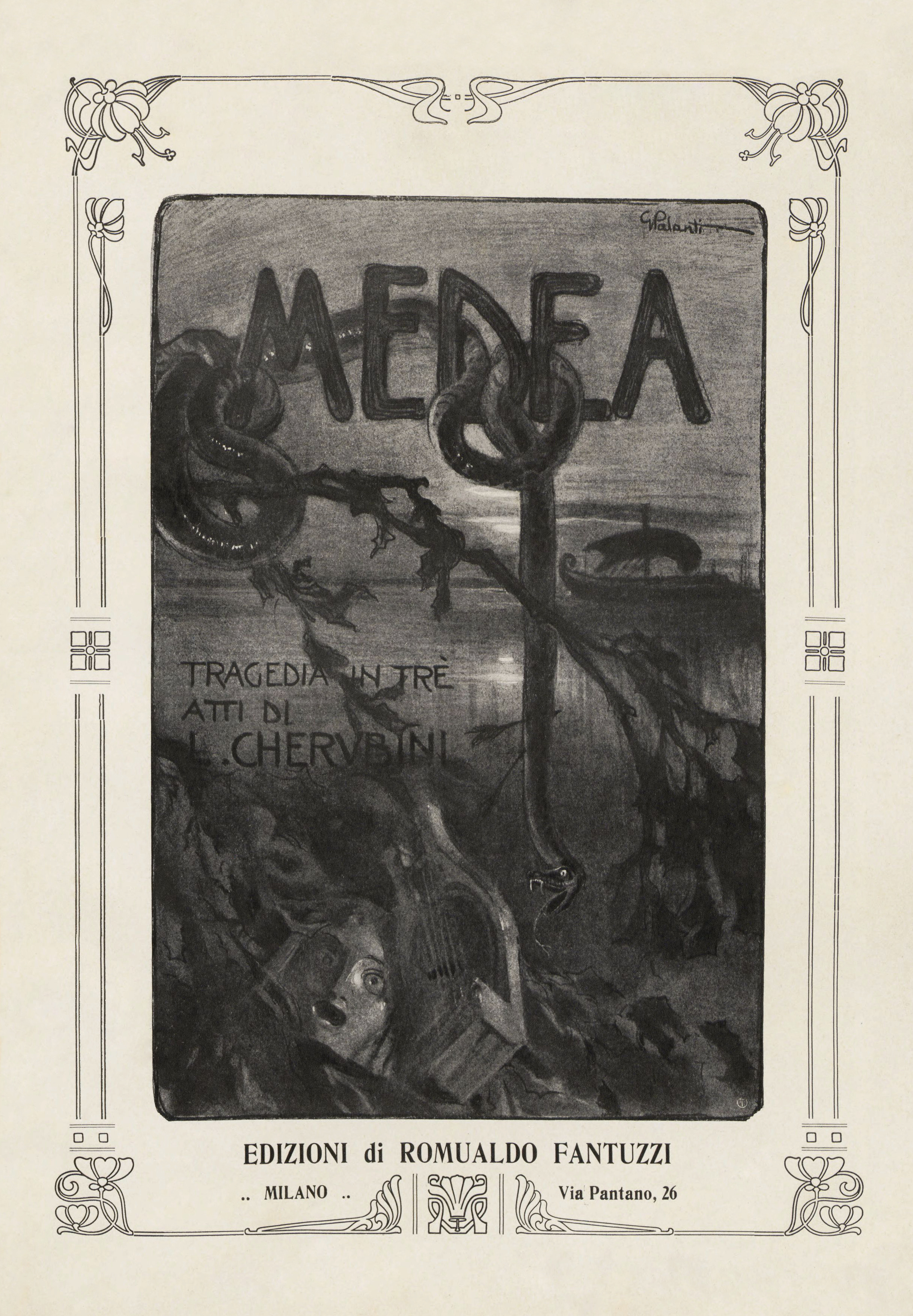
Title page to a vocal score of the 1909 hybrid version.

- 1909: The Italian translation of the Lachner version by Carlo Zangarini was prepared for its Italian premiere at the Teatro alla Scala, on 30 December 1909, and starred Ester Mazzoleni. It was this hybrid version that was revived in 1953 for Maria Callas.

=== Callas revivals (1953–1962) ===
Perhaps the most famous 20th-century revival of the work was in Florence in 1953, with Maria Callas in the title role, conducted by Vittorio Gui. Callas learned and performed the role within a week, to critical acclaim. The production was so successful that the Teatro alla Scala decided to stage this opera during the opening week of its 1953–1954 season, with Leonard Bernstein filling in for an indisposed Victor de Sabata and staged by Margherita Wallmann.

Callas performed the role throughout the 1950s and early 1960s, with possibly the most famous production being by the Dallas Opera in 1958, conducted by Nicola Rescigno (with Jon Vickers as Jason and Teresa Berganza as Néris) and directed by the Greek director Alexis Minotis. This production traveled to the Royal Opera House, Covent Garden, in London in 1959, in the Ancient Theatre of Epidaurus in 1961 with the collaboration of the Greek National Opera and to La Scala (where a few minutes of it were filmed) in 1961–62. It was in these performances that Callas made her last appearances in Italy.

The Rescigno–Minotis production was successfully revived again for Magda Olivero in Dallas (1967) and Kansas City (1968).

=== Late 20th-century revivals ===
- 1984–1995: Revivals of the original French version were given at the Buxton Festival on 28 July 1984; at The Royal Opera House, Covent Garden on 6 November 1989; and at the Valle d'Itria Festival on 4 August 1995.
- 1996: The shortened Vienna version was given in an English translation and sung in English by Opera North in Leeds in April 1996.
- March 1997: A Bicentennial production by Opera Quotannis presented an unabridged (text and music) version (with a period-instrument orchestra) of the original opéra-comique at Alice Tully Hall, Lincoln Center, commemorating the bicentennial of the premiere. Bart Folse conducted Brian Morgan's stylized production, which featured Phyllis Treigle (in the title role), Carl Halvorson (as Jason), D'Anna Fortunato (as Néris), David Arnold (as Créon), Thaïs St Julien (as Dircé), and Jayne West and Andrea Matthews (as the Handmaidens of Dircé). Peter G. Davis, in New York magazine, wrote that "Opera Quotannis delivers Cherubini's Médée in all its original glory.... The occasion proved that the real Médée is indeed a masterpiece. Its weak sister, the doctored Medea we've been hearing all these years, should now be permanently set aside." Newport Classic subsequently recorded the production for Compact Disc.

The role of Médée is famed for its difficulty. Other famous interpreters of the role in the 20th century included Dame Josephine Barstow, Montserrat Caballé, Eileen Farrell, Marisa Galvany, Leyla Gencer, Dame Gwyneth Jones, Nadja Michael, Maralin Niska, Leonie Rysanek, Sylvia Sass, Anja Silja, Dunja Vejzovic, and Shirley Verrett. Anna Caterina Antonacci performed the Italian version in the first decade of the 21st century: the recording of a performance from the 2008 Turin edition has been released on DVD. The opera, in its Italian version, was performed for the first time at the Metropolitan Opera in 2022, with Sondra Radvanovsky, Matthew Polenzani, Janai Brugger, Michele Pertusi, and Ekaterina Gubanova. It was featured on the Metropolitan Opera Live in HD on Saturday, 22 October 2022 and a recorded encore broadcast showing took place on Wednesday, 26 October 2022.

== Roles ==
Role	Voice type	Premiere cast, 13 March 1797 (Conductor: – )
Médée	soprano	Julie-Angélique Scio
Dircé, Créon's daughter	soprano	Mademoiselle Rosine
Néris, Médée's slave	soprano	Madame Verteuil
Jason	tenor	Pierre Gaveaux
King Créon	bass	Alexis Dessaules
Captain of the Guard	speaking role	M Le Grand
Two handmaidens of Dirce	sopranos	Émilie Gavaudan, Mlle Beck
Two children	silent roles	
Chorus: Servants of Dircé, Argonauts, priests, warriors, people of Corinth

== Synopsis ==
Place: Corinth
Time: Antiquity

=== Act 1 ===
Outside the palace of King Créon

Dircé is preparing for her wedding to Jason. Years ago, Jason had stolen the Golden Fleece with the help of Médée, who had betrayed her family and established a relationship with Jason, the result of which was two children. Although Jason has since abandoned Médée, she reappears and demands that he return to her. Jason refuses and Médée curses him, swearing vengeance.

=== Act 2 ===
Inside the palace

In despair, Médée is encouraged by her slave, Néris, to leave the city. Créon then appears and orders that Médée leave. She asks for one more day with her children and, after the king agrees, she appears to be calmer and gives Néris two wedding presents to take to her rival.

=== Act 3 ===
Between the palace and the temple

Néris brings the two children out to where Médée is waiting. Sounds of lamentation are heard from within the palace and it is discovered that one of Médée's wedding presents has poisoned Dircé. An angry crowd gathers and Néris, Médée, and the children take refuge in the temple. From the temple, the two women reappear with Médée grasping a blood-stained knife with which she has killed her two children. Médée curses Jason and disappears into the air. The temple goes up in flames and the crowd flees in terror.

== Recordings ==
Original French version:

Year	Cast (Médée, Dircé, Néris, Jason, Créon)	Conductor, Opera House and Orchestra	Label
1995	Iano Tamar, Patrizia Ciofi, Magali Damonte, Luca Lombardo, Jean-Philippe Courtis	Patrick Fournillier; Orchestra Internazionale d'Italia Opera (Abridged Live performance at the Palazzo Ducale, Martina Franca during the XX Festival della Valle d'Itria, August) (version has substantial cuts)	Audio CD: Nuova Era; Cat: 7253/54; Nuova Era, Cat: 231687 (Reissue 2008)
1997	Phyllis Treigle, Thaïs St Julien, D'Anna Fortunato, Carl Halvorson, David Arnold	Bart Folse, Brewer Chamber Orchestra and the Chorus Quotannis (uncut)	Audio CD: Newport Classic; Cat: NPD 85622/2

Italian translation, with recitatives by Franz Lachner:

Year	Cast (Medea, Glauce, Neris, Giasone, Creonte)	Conductor, Opera House and Orchestra	Label
1953	Maria Callas, Gabriella Tucci, Fedora Barbieri, Carlos Guichandut, Mario Petri	Vittorio Gui (XVI Maggio Musicale Fiorentino), (Recording of a performance at Teatro Comunale, 7 May)	Audio CDs: HUNT CD 516; ARKADIA CDHP 516.2; MELODRAM GM 2.0037; IDIS 6394/95
1953	Maria Callas, Maria Luisa Nache, Fedora Barbieri, Gino Penno, Giuseppe Modesti	Leonard Bernstein; Teatro alla Scala Orchestra and Chorus (Recording of a performance at La Scala, 10 December)	Audio CD: EMI
1957	Maria Callas, Renata Scotto, Miriam Pirazzini, Mirto Picchi, Giuseppe Modesti	Tullio Serafin; Teatro alla Scala Orchestra and Chorus	Audio CD: EMI; Cat: CDMB-63625
1958	Maria Callas, Elisabeth Carron, Teresa Berganza, Jon Vickers, Nicola Zaccaria	Nicola Rescigno; Dallas Civic Opera Company (Recording of a performance at State Fair Music Hall, Dallas, 8 November)	Audio CDs: MELODRAM MEL 26016; GALA GL 100.521; MYTO 2 CD 00164
1959	Maria Callas, Joan Carlyle, Fiorenza Cossotto, Jon Vickers, Nicola Zaccaria	Nicola Rescigno; Orchestra and Chorus of the Royal Opera House, Covent Garden. (Recording of a performance by the BBC at the Royal Opera House, 30 June)	Audio CD: ICA Classics; Cat: ICAC 5110. (Issued under licence from the BBC, London)
1961	Maria Callas, Ivana Tosini, Giulietta Simionato, Jon Vickers, Nicolai Ghiaurov	Thomas Schippers; Teatro alla Scala Orchestra and Chorus (Recording of a performance at La Scala, 11 December)	Audio CDs: HUNT 2 CDLSMH 34028; ARKADIA CDMP 428.2; OMBRA OMB 7003 (abridged); OPERA D’ORO OPD 1251 2
1967	Dame Gwyneth Jones, Pilar Lorengar, Fiorenza Cossotto, Bruno Prevedi, Justino Díaz	Lamberto Gardelli; Orchestra and Chorus of Accademia Nazionale di Santa Cecilia	Audio CD: Decca «Double» Cat: 452 611–2
1977	Sylvia Sass, Magda Kalmár, Klára Takács, Veriano Luchetti, Kolos Kováts	Lamberto Gardelli, Hungarian Radio and Television Symphony Orchestra and Chorus	Audio CD: Hungaroton; Cat: HCD 11904-05-2
2009	Anna Caterina Antonacci, Cinzia Forte, Sara Mingardo, Giuseppe Filianoti, Giovanni Battista Parodi	Evelino Pidò, Orchestra and Chorus of the Teatro Regio (Turin) (Recording of a performance at the Teatro Regio in Turin, 5 October 2008)	Video DVD: Hardy; Cat: HCD 4038
2022	Sondra Radvanovsky, Janai Brugger, Ekaterina Gubanova, Matthew Polenzani, Michele Pertusi	Carlo Rizzi, Orchestra and Chorus of the Metropolitan Opera (Production/set designer: David McVicar; recording of a performance at the Metropolitan Opera House in New York, 22 October 2022)	Streaming HD video: Met Opera on Demand

== Influence ==
Ludwig van Beethoven esteemed Cherubini, and owned a copy of the score of Médée; themes from Beethoven's Pathétique Sonata have a strong likeness to figures and ideas in the opera.
