= Cyril and Libbye Hellier =

Operatic sopranos

Cyril and Libbye Hellier (born January 21, 1952) are identical twins and American operatic sopranos. Natives of Houma, Louisiana, they are the great-grandchildren of the Confederate Colonel John Henry Hellier.

The sopranos are Nicholls State University's Department of Music graduates, where they appeared in a 1980 production of Menotti's Amahl and the Night Visitors, with Cyril singing the part of Amahl. Earlier that year, however, they formally debuted in a production of Puccini's Suor Angelica (with Libbye essaying the name role), at Loyola University of the South.

After a hiatus of seven years, the Helliers returned to the stage for the title roles of Humperdinck's Hänsel und Gretel, for The New Opera Theatre, New Orleans. In the 1988-89 season, they alternated as Bastienne in the child Mozart's Bastien und Bastienne for the same ensemble. In the final season of The New Opera Theatre, they appeared in a Benefit Concert also featuring Natalia Rom.

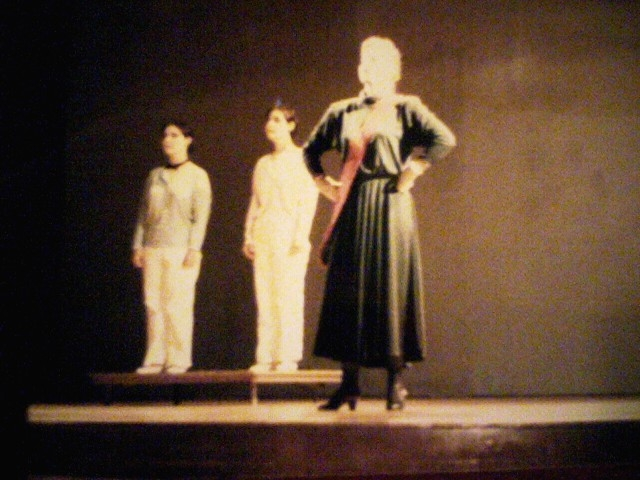
Libbye & Cyril Hellier, with Suzanne Duplantis as the Witch, in Hänsel und Gretel, 1987.

In April 1991, the Helliers were soloists in Part III of Handel's Messiah (in the Foundling Hospital Anthem version), at St Francis de Sales Cathedral, Houma. In October 1992, the sopranos made their New York debuts, as Kindred (Cyril) and Cousin (Libbye) in the New York premiere of Louise LaBruyère's Everyman, after the Mystery Play, for Opera Quotannis, at the Church of St Paul the Apostle at Lincoln Center. The production then traveled to New Orleans.

In recent years, the twins have been heard in the celebrated "Katrina Memorial Concerts," at the Church of Our Lady of Good Counsel, in the Garden District of New Orleans. Also featured at those Concerts was the soprano Phyllis Treigle. Their most recent appearance was at "A Christmas Concert," at St Stephen Church (now a Minor Basilica), in New Orleans, in 2009, at which they performed a duet by Peter Cornelius.
