= Renata Scotto discography =

The soprano Renata Scotto made many recordings, some of complete operas, others of collections of arias. Some of her performances can be seen on video, recorded live, especially in Metropolitan Opera broadcasts.

== Recordings ==
- Bellini: Norma (Troyanos, Giacomini, Plishka; Levine, 1979) CBS Masterworks
- Cherubini: Médée [in Italian] (Callas, Pirazzini, Picchi; Serafin, 1957) Ricordi/Mercury
- Cilea: Adriana Lecouvreur (Obratzsova, Domingo, Milnes; Levine, 1977) CBS
- Donizetti: Anna Bolena (Marsee, Ramey; Rudel, 1975) [live] Opera Depot
- Donizetti: Lucia di Lammermoor (di Stefano, Bastianini; Sanzogno, 1959) Deutsche Grammophon
- Giordano: Andrea Chénier (Domingo, Milnes; Levine, 1976) RCA Red Seal
- Leoncavallo: Pagliacci (Carreras, Nurmela, Allen; Muti, 1978) EMI
- Mascagni: Cavalleria rusticana (Domingo, Elvíra; Levine, 1978) RCA Red Seal
- Meyerbeer: Le prophète (Horne, McCracken, Hines; Lewis, 1976) CBS
- Pergolesi: La serva padrona (Bruscantini; Fasano, p. 1960) Ricordi/Mercury
- Puccini: La bohème (Meneguzzer, Poggi, Gobbi; Votto, 1961) Deutsche Grammophon
- Puccini: La bohème (Neblett, Kraus, Milnes, Manuguerra, Plishka; Levine, 1979) EMI
- Puccini: Edgar (Killebrew, Bergonzi, Sardinero; Queler, 1977) [live] CBS
- Puccini: Madama Butterfly (Bergonzi; Barbirolli, 1966) EMI
- Puccini: Madama Butterfly (Knight, Domingo, Wixell; Maazel, 1978) CBS
- Puccini: Suor Angelica (Cotrubaș, Horne; Maazel, 1976) CBS
- Puccini: Il tabarro (Knight, Domingo, Gobbi; Maazel, 1977) CBS
- Puccini: Tosca (Domingo, Bruson; Levine, 1980) EMI
- Puccini: Turandot (Nilsson, Corelli; Molinari-Pradelli, 1965) EMI
- Puccini: Le villi (Domingo, Nucci, Gobbi; Maazel, 1979) CBS
- Refice: Cecilia [abridged] (Theyard; Campori, 1976) [live] VAI
- Respighi: Il tramonto (Fulton, 1982) Vox
- Verdi: Arias (Gavazzeni, 1975) CBS
- Verdi: Arias (Fulton, 1983) Hungaroton
- Verdi: Complete Songs (Washington, Scalera, 1989) [live] Nuovo Era
- Verdi: Nabucco (Luchetti, Manuguerra, Ghiaurov; Muti, 1977–78) EMI
- Verdi: Otello (Domingo, Milnes; Levine, 1978) RCA Red Seal
- Verdi: Requiem (Baltsa, Luchetti, Nesterenko; Muti, 1978) EMI
- Verdi: Rigoletto (Kraus, Bastianini; Gavazzeni, 1960) Deutsche Grammophon
- Verdi: Rigoletto (Cossotto, Bergonzi, Fischer-Dieskau; Kubelík, 1964) Deutsche Grammophon
- Verdi: La traviata (G.Raimondi, Bastianini; Votto, 1962) Deutsche Grammophon
- Verdi: La traviata (Kraus, Bruson; Muti, 1980) EMI
- Wolf-Ferrari: Il segreto di Susanna (Bruson; Pritchard, 1980) CBS
- Christmas with Renata Scotto at St Patrick's Cathedral (Grady; Anselmi, 1981) RCA Red Seal
- French Arias (Rosekrans, 1987) Hungaroton
- The French Album - II (Rosekrans, 1988) Hungaroton
- In Duet (Freni; Anselmi/Magiera, 1978) Decca
- Italian Opera Arias (Gavazzeni, 1974) CBS
- Live in Paris (I.Davis, 1983) Etcetera [live]
- Renata Scotto In Concert (1969) RCA Red Seal
- Romantic Opera Duets (Domingo; Adler, 1978) CBS
- Serenata (Atkins, c. 1977) CBS

== Videos ==
- Massenet: Werther (Kraus, Sardinero; Guingal, De Tomasi, 1987) [live]
- Puccini: La bohème [as Mimì] (Niska, Pavarotti, Wixell, Plishka, Tajo; Levine, Melano, 1977) [live]
- Puccini: La bohème [as Musetta] (Stratas, Carreras, Stilwell, Morris; Levine, Zeffirelli, 1982) [live]
- Puccini: Manon Lescaut (Domingo, Elvíra, Capecchi; Levine, Menotti, 1980) [live]
- Puccini: Il trittico (Norden, Taillon, Moldoveanu, Creech, MacNeil, Bacquier; Levine, Melano, 1981) [live]
- Verdi: Don Carlos [in Italian] (Troyanos, Moldoveanu, Milnes, Plishka, Hines; Levine, Dexter, 1980) [live]
- Verdi: Luisa Miller (Kraft, Domingo, Milnes, Giaiotti, Morris; Levine, Merrill, 1979) [live]
- Verdi: Otello (Vickers, MacNeil; Levine, Zeffirelli, 1978) [live]
- Zandonai: Francesca da Rimini (Rom, Domingo, MacNeil, Levine, Faggioni, 1984) [live]
- "Live in Budapest" (Lukács, 1991) [live]
- Tokyo Recital (Fulton, 1984) [live]
