= Cristina Deutekom =

Dutch operatic soprano

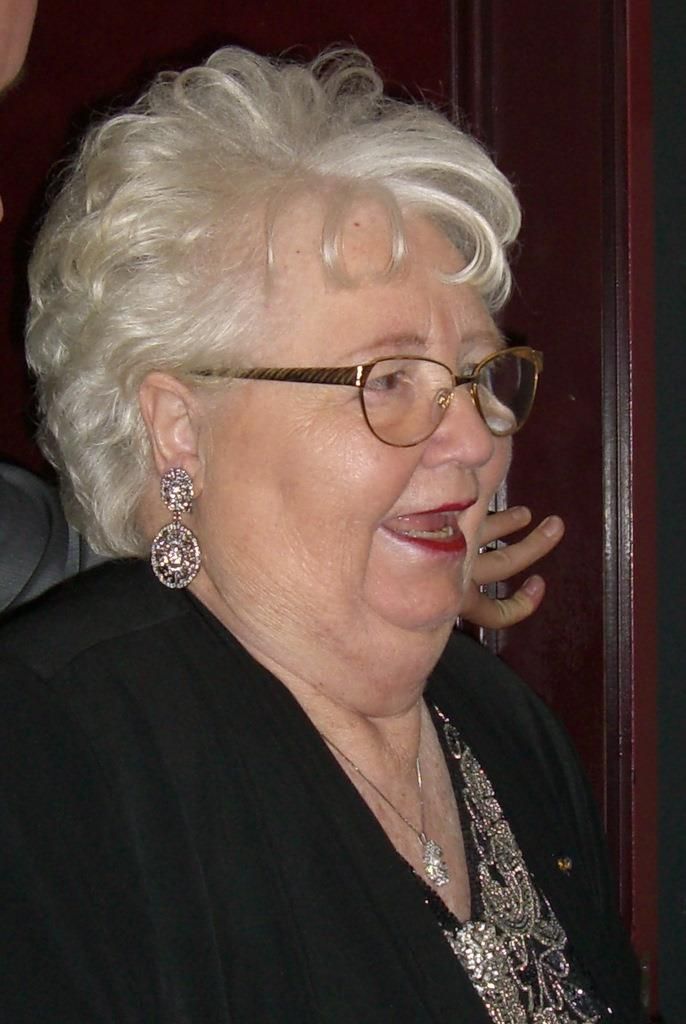
- Cristina Deutekom, 2011
- Born: Stientje Engel; 28 August 1931; Amsterdam, Netherlands
- Died: 7 August 2014 (aged 82); Amsterdam, Netherlands
- Education: Conservatorium van Amsterdam
- Occupation: Opera singer (soprano)
- Years active: 1957–1987
- Title: Knight of the Order of Orange-Nassau (1974)
- Spouse: Jacob "Jaap" Deutekom (m. 1952)

Cristina Deutekom (Note: also known as Christine Deutekom and Christina Deutekom) (28 August 1931 – 7 August 2014) was a Dutch operatic dramatic coloratura soprano.

She sang with many of the leading tenors of her time, including Carlo Bergonzi, José Carreras, Franco Corelli, Plácido Domingo, Nicolai Gedda, Alfredo Kraus, Mario del Monaco, Luciano Pavarotti, and Richard Tucker.

== Life ==
Deutekom was born Stientje Engel in Amsterdam. She studied at the Conservatorium van Amsterdam with Coby Riemersma and Felix Hupka. In 1963, she made her debut with De Nederlandse Opera as Queen of the Night in Mozart's The Magic Flute. After some lesser roles with the company, she contemplated giving up singing altogether, since her career did not seem to progress.

During a performance of Der Rosenkavalier in Spain – in which she was singing the smaller role of Marianne Leitmetzerin – Deutekom was overheard warming up with the Queen of the Night aria in her dressing room by Elisabeth Schwarzkopf, who was singing the Marschallin in that night's performance. Story has it that Schwarzkopf opened the door and asked: "Child, do you know what you are singing there?" and was shocked to hear that she was not performing this role all over the world. "I do not think much of any impresario, that does not recognize such talent", she said and introduced her to her own manager, Rudi Rothenberg. She then went on to conquer the major opera houses in succession with the Queen of the Night. After her performance at the Royal Opera House, Covent Garden, Opera magazine reviewed her performance, saying: "Except for Maria Callas in her prime, we have hardly heard anything of equal quality here before". In 1968 she took to the Metropolitan Opera, New York and was acclaimed by The New York Times to be "the greatest Queen of the Night of our time". In 1974, she opened the Met season as Elena in I vespri siciliani alongside Plácido Domingo.

Besides the Queen of the Night, her Mozart roles included Donna Anna in Don Giovanni, Fiordiligi in Così fan tutte and Vitellia in La clemenza di Tito. She sang the great bel canto roles, specifically in Rossini's Armida, in Bellini's Norma and I puritani, and in Donizetti's Lucia di Lammermoor.

She went on to the great dramatic Verdi roles including Abigaile in Nabucco, Lady Macbeth, Leonora in Il trovatore, Amelia in Un ballo in maschera, and Elena in I vespri siciliani. Other roles which were captured in commercial recordings include Giselda in I Lombardi and Odabella in Attila. Finally, she sang the title roles in Cherubini's Médée and Puccini's Turandot.

Deutekom decided to end her stage career on the last day of 1986, after having heart problems during a performance of the opera Amaya in Bilbao. She turned to giving master classes internationally.

She made a return in November 1996 at the Concertgebouw Operafeest, at the age of 65 singing the Bolero from I vespri siciliani and Anna Elisa's aria "Liebe, du Himmel auf Erden" from the operetta Paganini, reportedly "bringing the house down". As of 2001, she was a guest teacher at the Royal Conservatory of The Hague, but following a stroke in 2004, she retired from public life.

On 26 October 2011, a tribute gala concert for her, initiated by baritone Ernst Daniël Smid was staged at the Royal Theater Carré. This was the soprano's last public appearance.

== Vocal technique ==
For fast coloratura passages, Deutekom developed a glottal-stop technique, sometimes called glottal staccato. In her own country, a few criticized it as hinting of yodelling, while others dubbed her coloratura technique "cluckatura." Elsewhere, her technique was extra appreciated. In Italy, she was named singer of the year in 1973 and 1974, precisely because of her deliveries of bel canto.

== Personal life ==
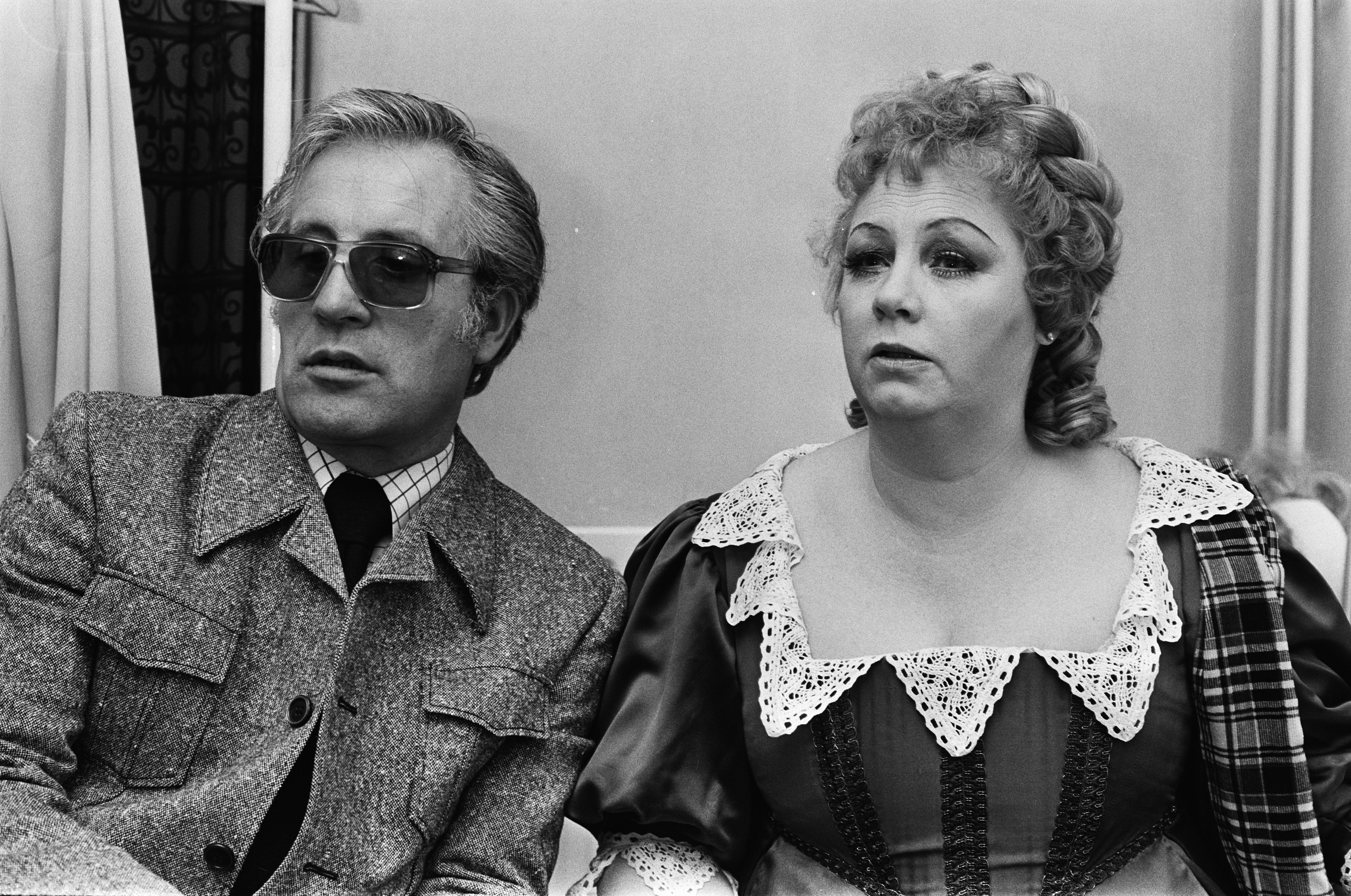
Deutekom and her husband in 1979

She married Jacob "Jaap" Deutekom, a boxer, in 1952, and they had a daughter, Irma, born in 1955. Deutekom died on 7 August 2014 after a fall in her home.

== Additional operatic repertoire ==
- Beethoven: Fidelio (Marzelline)
- Bellini: Bianca e Fernando (Bianca)
- Cherubini: Médée (Medea)
- Händel: Alcina (Alcina)
- Rossini: Mosè in Egitto (Sinaide)
- Saint-Saëns: Henry VIII (Catherine de Aragon)
- Strauss, R: Der Rosenkavalier (Marianne Leitmetzerin)
- Verdi: Alzira (Alzira), I masnadieri (Amalia), Rigoletto (Gilda), Simon Boccanegra (Amelia/Maria)
- Wagner: Götterdämmerung (Woglinde), Das Rheingold (Woglinde), Die Walküre (Walküre)

== Honours ==
- Knight of the Order of Orange-Nassau, 1974
- Singer of the year, Milan, 1974
- Singer of the year, Milan, 1973
- Premio Romeo e Juliet, Verona, 1972
- Rigoletto d'Oro, Mantua, 1973
- Monteverdi d'Oro, Venice, 1972
- Palco Scenico d'Oro, Mantua, 1971
- Grand Prix du Disque of the Académie Charles Cros, Paris, 1968
- Arena d'Oro, Verona, 1976

== Discography ==
=== Operas ===
- 1970 – The Queen of the Night in Die Zauberflöte – with Martti Talvela, Stuart Burrows, Dietrich Fischer-Dieskau, Kurt Equiluz, Pilar Lorengar, Gerhard Stolze, Yvonne Minton, Hermann Prey, Renate Holm, René Kollo, Hans Sotin – Wiener Staatsopernchor, Wiener Philharmoniker, conducted by Sir Georg Solti (Decca Records).
- 1973 – Giselda in I Lombardi – with Plácido Domingo, Ruggero Raimondi, Stafford Dean, Clifford Grant – Ambrosian Singers, Royal Philharmonic Orchestra, conducted by Lamberto Gardelli (Philips Records).
- 1973 – Odabella in Attila – with Ruggero Raimondi, Sherrill Milnes, Carlo Bergonzi, Jules Bastin – Ambrosian Singers, Royal Philharmonic Orchestra, conducted by Lamberto Gardelli (Philips Records).
