= Michael Devlin (bass-baritone) =

American opera singer (born 1942)

Michael Devlin (born November 27, 1942, in Chicago, Illinois) is an American opera singer who is internationally known as a bass-baritone and singing-actor.

== New Orleans Opera ==
The protégé of the great Norman Treigle, Devlin began his career with the New Orleans Opera Association, where he debuted in a small role in La bohème (with Audrey Schuh as Mimì), in 1963. His next appearance was as Spalanzani in Les contes d'Hoffmann (a performance now available on Compact Discs, from VAI), with Beverly Sills and Treigle, in 1964. He was subsequently seen in Werther (opposite Giuseppe di Stefano), Carmen, Ariadne auf Naxos, Aïda (as Amonasro, with Marisa Galvany) and, in 1999, returned for The Ballad of Baby Doe (as William Jennings Bryan).

== New York City Opera ==
At the New York City Opera, Devlin first sang the Ermitaño Ciego in the North American premiere of Ginastera's Don Rodrigo, conducted by Julius Rudel and staged by Tito Capobianco, in 1966. Further appearances there included L'amour des trois oranges (as Léandre), Giulio Cesare (as Nireno, later the title role), The Crucible (opposite Chester Ludgin), Bomarzo (1968), Nine Rivers from Jordan (world premiere, by Weisgall), La bohème (as Colline), Le coq d'or, Lucia di Lammermoor, Manon, Œdipus rex, Le nozze di Figaro (in the title role), Mefistofele (with Harry Theyard), Louise, Carmen, Maria Stuarda, Susannah, Così fan tutte, Les contes d'Hoffmann, Faust (in Frank Corsaro's production) and Pelléas et Mélisande (as Golaud). He returned to the company in 2000, for The Mother of Us All, portraying Daniel Webster.

== Metropolitan Opera ==
Devlin made his Metropolitan Opera debut in 1978 as Escamillo in Carmen. His other performances at that venue have included Hänsel und Gretel (as Peter), Les contes d'Hoffmann (as the Villains, opposite Plácido Domingo), Die Fledermaus (as Dr Falke), Bluebeard's Castle (with Jessye Norman), Salome (as Jokanaan), Samson et Dalila (as Abimélech), Faust, and Wozzeck (as the Doctor), altogether singing 229 performances in over thirty years with the Met. He has also appeared with companies in Chicago, Amsterdam, Salzburg, Verona, Madrid, London (Salome at Covent Garden), Paris, Prague, Los Angeles (Don Pizarro in Fidelio, with Karan Armstrong), San Francisco (Il prigioniero), Santa Fe (Figaro, Count Almaviva, Don Giovanni, Onegin), etc.

In a fifty-year career, he collaborated with such conductors as Leopold Stokowski, Eugene Ormandy, Sir Georg Solti, Erich Leinsdorf, James Levine, Sir Bernard Haitink, Leonard Bernstein, Sir Neville Marriner, Riccardo Muti, Christoph von Dohnányi, Pierre Boulez, and many others.

In January 2012, Mr Devlin portrayed Pope St Leo I, "the Great," in Attila for the Seattle Opera. He is now retired and resides in Seattle.

== Discography ==
Works in his discography include Handel's Giulio Cesare (as Nireno, conducted by Rudel, 1967), Ginastera's Bomarzo (with Salvador Novoa, 1967), Haydn's L'infedeltà delusa (with Edith Mathis and Barbara Hendricks, conducted by Antal Doráti, 1980), Rameau's Dardanus (with Frederica von Stade, conducted by Raymond Leppard, 1980), and Schönberg's Moses und Aron (as the Ephraimite, conducted by Boulez, 1995).

In 2020, Opera Depot published a 1971 performance of Charpentier's Louise, from the City Opera, with Devlin as the Father, conducted by Charles Wendelken-Wilson.

== Videography ==
- Humperdinck: Hänsel und Gretel (Blegen, von Stade; Fulton, Merrill/Donnell, 1982) [live] Deutsche Grammophon
- Meyerbeer: L'africaine (Verrett, Swenson, Domingo, Díaz; Arena, Mansouri, 1988) [live] ArtHaus
- Strauss: Salome (Ewing, Knight, Riegel; Downes, Hall, 1992) [live] Kultur
- Berg: Wozzeck [as the Doctor] (Dalayman, Neumann, Struckmann; Levine, Lamos, 2001) [live] Metropolitan Opera
