= Treigle =

Treigle is a surname. Notable people with the surname include:

- Norman Treigle (1927–1975), American operatic bass-baritone
- Phyllis Treigle (born 1960), American soprano
