= Anthony Laciura =

American actor and operatic tenor

- Born: September 27, 1951 (age 74); New Orleans, Louisiana, U.S.
- Education: Loyola University New Orleans; Tulane University.
- Occupations: Singer; Actor

Anthony Laciura (born September 27, 1951) is an American actor and operatic tenor. Laciura is often noted for his abilities as a comprimario, and actor. Born in New Orleans, he studied voice there with Charles Paddock, also the teacher of Ticho Parly. He is also well known for playing Eddie Kessler in Boardwalk Empire (2010–13).

== Career ==
As a boy soprano, Laciura made his operatic debut in a small role in Louise, in March 1965, at the New Orleans Opera Association, opposite the last performances in this opera of Dorothy Kirsten and Norman Treigle. He is a graduate of Holy Cross School Class of 1969. As an adult, he would give many performances with that company, and would earn music degrees from Loyola University of the South and Tulane University.

On the Opening Night of the 1982–83 season, the tenor debuted with the Metropolitan Opera, where he appeared well over 800 times. That first role was the Major-domo in Der Rosenkavalier, with Dame Kiri Te Kanawa. In fact, that production was televised, as were Laciura's performances in La forza del destino (directed by John Dexter, 1984), Francesca da Rimini (with Renata Scotto and Plácido Domingo, 1984), Tosca (1985), Le nozze di Figaro (opposite Ruggero Raimondi, and produced by Jean-Pierre Ponnelle, 1985), Die Fledermaus (1987), Carmen (in Sir Peter Hall's production, 1987), Turandot (conducted by James Levine, 1987), Les contes d'Hoffmann (1988), Ariadne auf Naxos (with Jessye Norman, 1988), La fanciulla del West (1992), Falstaff (with Paul Plishka, Mirella Freni, and Marilyn Horne, 1992), I lombardi alla prima crociata (opposite Luciano Pavarotti, 1993), Billy Budd (1997), Le nozze di Figaro (1998), and Wozzeck (2001). Several of these productions have been published on DVD. The tenor's final appearance at the Met was in The Gambler (2008). In October 2011, he returned to the New Orleans Opera, for Emperor Altoum, in Turandot.

Laciura has also appeared with companies in Geneva, Amsterdam, Montreal, Mexico City, Tokyo, San Francisco, Los Angeles, Chicago, and, especially, Santa Fe. In recent seasons, he has turned to stage direction, as well. From 2010 to 2013 he was seen in the HBO television series, Boardwalk Empire, which was produced by Martin Scorsese. He portrayed Eddie Kessler, butler to Nucky Thompson, played by Steve Buscemi.

He has lived in Teaneck, New Jersey, with his wife, Joel, since 1986.

== Discography ==
- Donizetti: Lucia di Lammermoor (Studer, Domingo, Pons, Ramey; Marin, 1990) Deutsche Grammophon
- Mozart: Le nozze di Figaro (Te Kanawa, Upshaw, Hampson, Furlanetto; Levine, 1990) Deutsche Grammophon
- Puccini: Madama Butterfly (Freni, Berganza, Carreras, Pons; Sinopoli, 1988) Deutsche Grammophon
- Puccini: Manon Lescaut (Freni, Pavarotti; Levine, 1993) Deutsche Grammophon
- Puccini: Tosca (Freni, Domingo, Ramey; Sinopoli, 1990) Deutsche Grammophon
- Verdi: La traviata (Studer, Pavarotti, Pons; Levine, 1991) Deutsche Grammophon
- Verdi: Il trovatore (Millo, Domingo; Levine, 1991) Sony
- Wagner: Parsifal (Norman, Domingo; Levine, 1991) Deutsche Grammophon
