= Opera Quotannis =

Opera Quotannis (OQ) was a New York-based opera company which was founded in 1990, with conductor Bart Folse as music director and stage director Brian Morgan (formerly of The New Opera Theatre) serving as artistic director. It specialized in experimental productions of both ancient and contemporary opera.

The ensemble's first production was in January 1991, Gluck's Orfeo ed Euridice, with countertenor Derek Lee Ragin as Orpheus and soprano Tracey Mitchell as Euridice, with a period-instrument orchestra, at the Church of St Paul the Apostle on the Upper West Side. Later in 1991, they mounted Monteverdi's Il combattimento di Tancredi e Clorinda, again with a period orchestra.

Ridley Chauvin in Opera Quotannis's production of Combattimento di Tancredi e Clorinda, 1991

In 1992, OQ produced the New York premiere of Louise LaBruyère's Everyman, after the medieval morality play. Mitchell sang the title role, with Cyril and Libbye Hellier as Kindred and Cousin, respectively. The production then toured to New Orleans. In 1995, the company presented a staged version of Schoenberg's Pierrot Lunaire (with Christine Schadeberg), at the New School for Social Research.

In March 1997, Opera Quotannis presented their final production, the original opéra-comique version of Cherubini's Médée, at Alice Tully Hall, Lincoln Center, marking the bicentennial of the work's premiere. In the cast were Phyllis Treigle, Carl Halvorson, D'Anna Fortunato, David Arnold, Thaïs St Julien, Jayne West and Andrea Matthews. Subsequently, Newport Classic recorded the production for release on compact discs.
