= I Lombardi alla prima crociata =

Opera by Giuseppe Verdi

I Lombardi
- Opera by Giuseppe Verdi
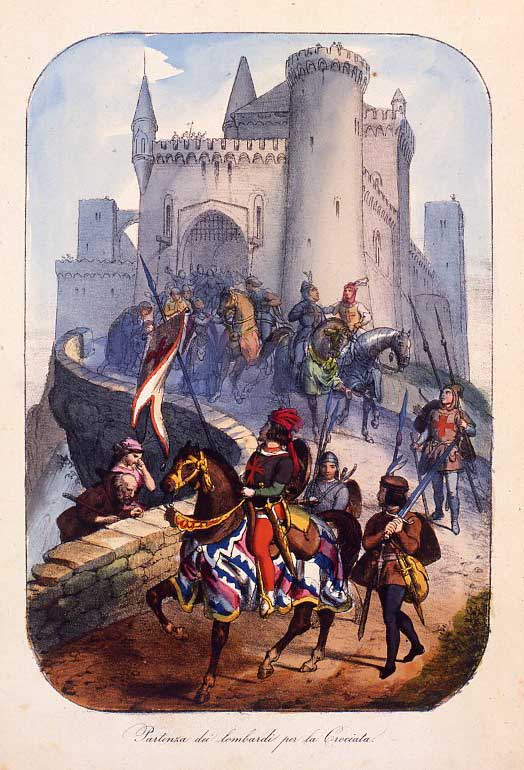
- "The departure of the Lombards for the Crusade"
- Librettist: Temistocle Solera
- Language: Italian
- Based on: Tommaso Grossi's epic poem, The Lombards in the First Crusade
- Premiere: 11 February 1843; Teatro alla Scala, Milan

I Lombardi alla prima crociata (The Lombards on the First Crusade) is an operatic dramma lirico in four acts by Giuseppe Verdi set to an Italian libretto by Temistocle Solera, based on an epic poem by Tommaso Grossi, which was "very much a child of its age; a grand historical novel with a patriotic slant". Its first performance was given at the Teatro alla Scala in Milan on 11 February 1843. Verdi dedicated the score to Maria Luigia, the Habsburg Duchess of Parma, who died a few weeks after the premiere. In 1847, the opera was significantly revised to become Verdi's first grand opera for performances in France at the Salle Le Peletier of the Paris Opera under the title of Jérusalem.

== Composition history ==
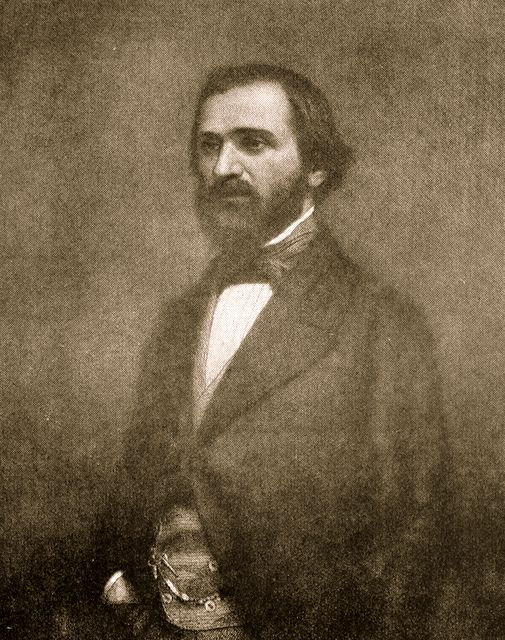
Giuseppe Verdi

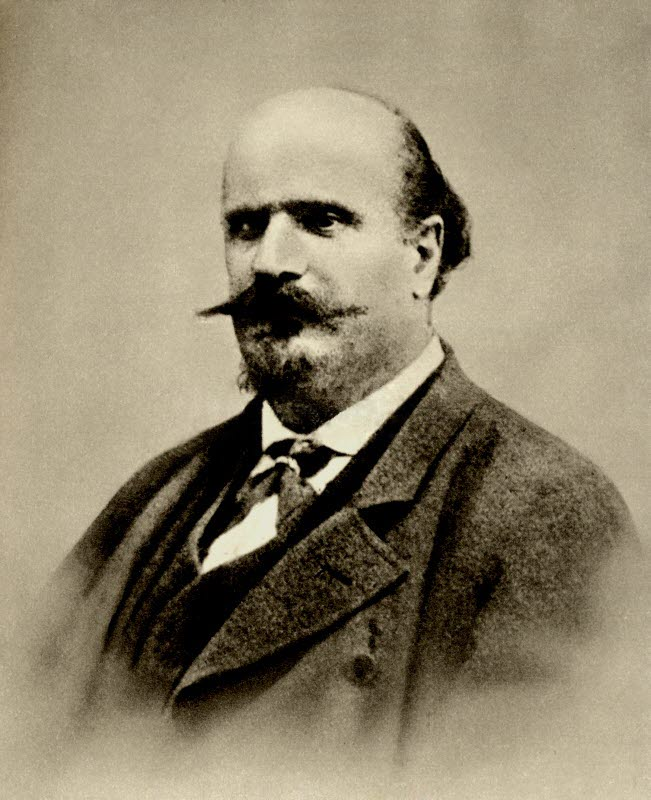
Temistocle Solera, the librettist of the opera

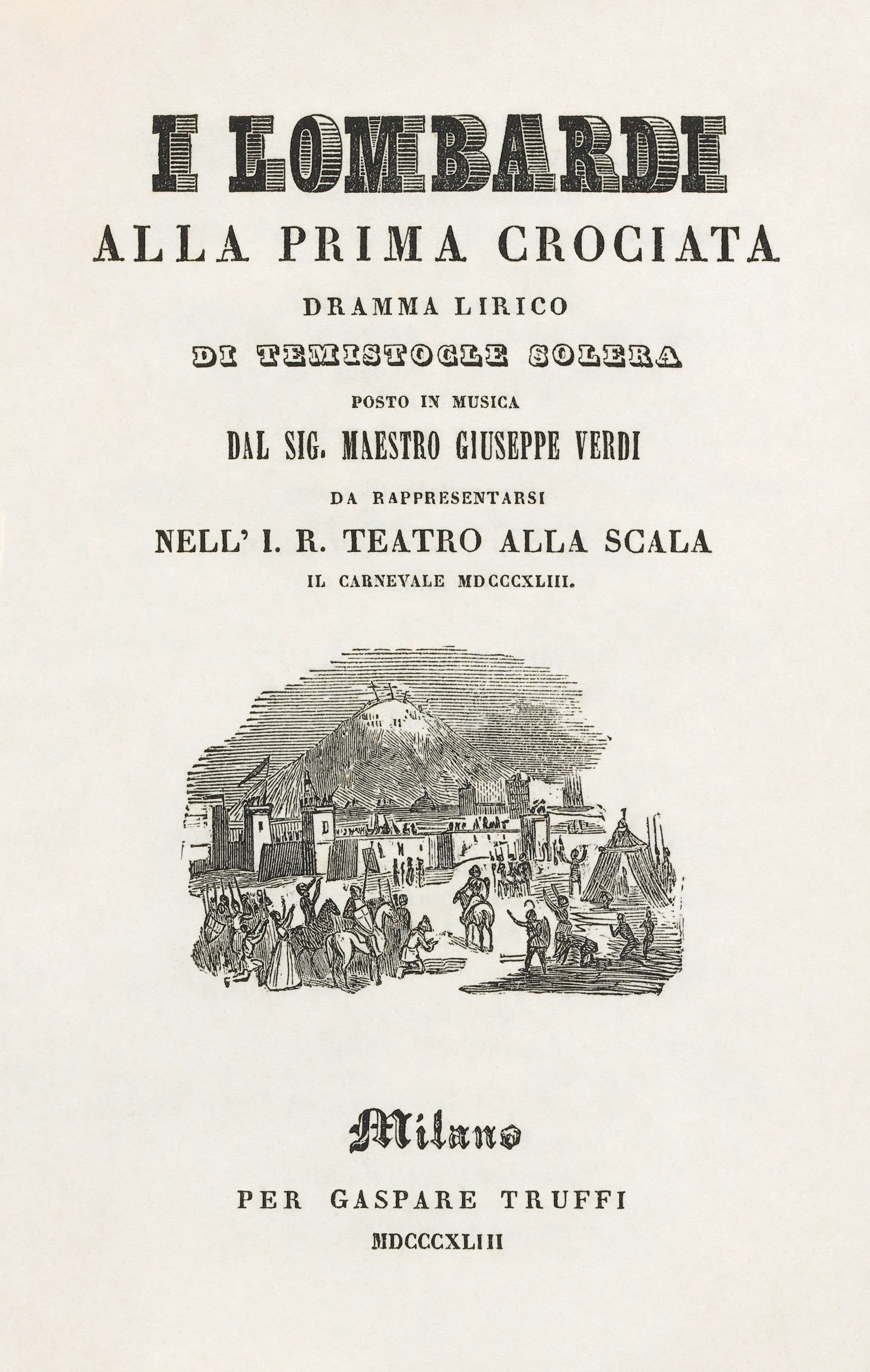
Title page of an 1843 libretto of I Lombardi

Grossi's original epic poem had plot complications that required the librettist to make significant changes; the historical characters portrayed in the original do not appear and the story becomes that of a fictional family and its involvement in the First Crusade. Julian Budden's analysis of the opera's origins notes: "In 1843 any subject where Italians were shown united against a common enemy was dangerous, especially in Austrian Milan. Yet strangely enough it was not the police but the church that took exception to I Lombardi", since the Archbishop of Milan had heard rumours that the work contained specific elements of Catholic ritual. However, given Verdi's refusal to make any changes to the music, it is fortunate that the sole alteration required was textual rather than musical: at the insistence of the censor, the title and text of the Act I prayer were changed from "Ave Maria" to "Salve Maria" in the autograph score, a change Verdi himself made by hand.

== Performance history ==
=== 19th century ===
While the premiere performance was a popular success, critical reactions were less enthusiastic and inevitable comparisons were made with Nabucco. However, one writer noted: "If [Nabucco] created this young man's reputation, I Lombardi served to confirm it.". Budden himself disagrees with this contemporary view, noting that "Nabucco is all of a piece, a unity, however crude; I Lombardi is an agglomeration of heterogeneous ideas, some remarkable, some unbelievably banal."

Budden notes that "for many years I Lombardi enjoyed the same kind of popularity as Nabucco, but he states that it did not fare well in Venice the following year and that it received few performances outside of Italy. However, within Italy, the opera was presented in Lucca in the summer of 1843, in Florence and Lucca in the autumn, and during the 1843/44 carnival season it was given in Trieste and Turin, while performances in 1845 were presented in Bologna and later, in the 1845/46 season, in Palermo and Mantua, in Macerata in the summer of 1846 and various other cities well into the 1850s. Even in the late 1880s, well after Jérusalem had been given, it was presented in Florence.

This "was the first of Verdi's operas to be heard in the United States, at Palmo's Opera House", on 3 March 1847 in New York. In the prior year the opera's British premiere had taken place on 12 May 1846 at Her Majesty's Theatre in London, Verdi having been invited there by the theatre's impresario, Benjamin Lumley: ".....I will go to London to write an opera" he had written, but in the end, illness prevented him from doing so.

However, with Italy approaching unification in the 1850s and in the decade following it in 1861, I Lombardi's call to peoples' patriotic instincts seemed to keep it alive, albeit that, by 1865 when Arrigo Boito saw a performance, he remarked that the opera was beginning to show its age.

=== 20th century and beyond ===
I Lombardi was presented in 1930 at La Scala in Milan as the season's opening production.

I Lombardi was given by the Opera Orchestra of New York in a concert version under the direction of Eve Queler at Carnegie Hall, New York, on July 12, 1972. Soloists included José Carreras, Renata Scotto, and Paul Plishka.

The opera was presented at the Royal Opera House in 1976 with José Carreras, Sylvia Sass and Nicola Ghiuselev as well as the same year by the Bilbao-based ABAO company. The cast included Matteo Manuguerra, Cristina Deutekom, Juan Pons, as well as Carreras.

Carlo Bergonzi and Paul Plishka, along with Cristina Deutekom appeared in the San Diego Opera's short-lived (1979 to 1984) summer "Verdi Festival" in June 1979 and it is claimed that this was a West Coast premiere. Over the years, New York audiences have seen the opera presented first by New York City Opera in 1982. Six years later, I Lombardi was given by the Opera Orchestra of New York in a concert version with Aprile Millo in April 1986 and this was followed by the opera's Metropolitan Opera premiere on December 2, 1993, as part of its 1993/94 season, a production which starred Luciano Pavarotti, Aprile Millo (replaced in most of the other performances by Lauren Flanigan), and Samuel Ramey in some of the major roles.

I Lombardi was presented at the Teatro Donizetti in Bergamo in late 2001 with Dimitra Theodossiou in the cast. The Teatro Regio di Parma produced it in January 2009, also as part of a complete Verdi cycle. The Parma performance is preserved on a DVD. Sarasota Opera's "Verdi Cycle" featured the opera during its 2011 season. Hamburg State Opera presented a production by David Alden as part of a mini-festival of three Verdi operas in October/November 2013.

The first new production of the opera to use a new critical edition created jointly by Ricordi and the University of Chicago Press was to have been a new production at the Teatro Regio di Parma as part of its 2020 Verdi Festival. However, this production was cancelled due to the COVID-19 pandemic, and as a result the critical edition instead had its premiere in a new production at the Teatro La Fenice on April 1, 2022, which marked the first time since 1844 that the opera had been staged at the house.

== Roles ==
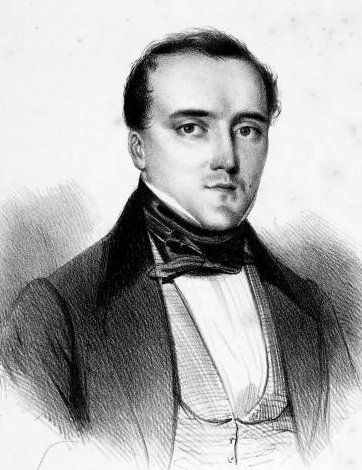
Prosper Dérivis sang Pagano in the 1843 premiere

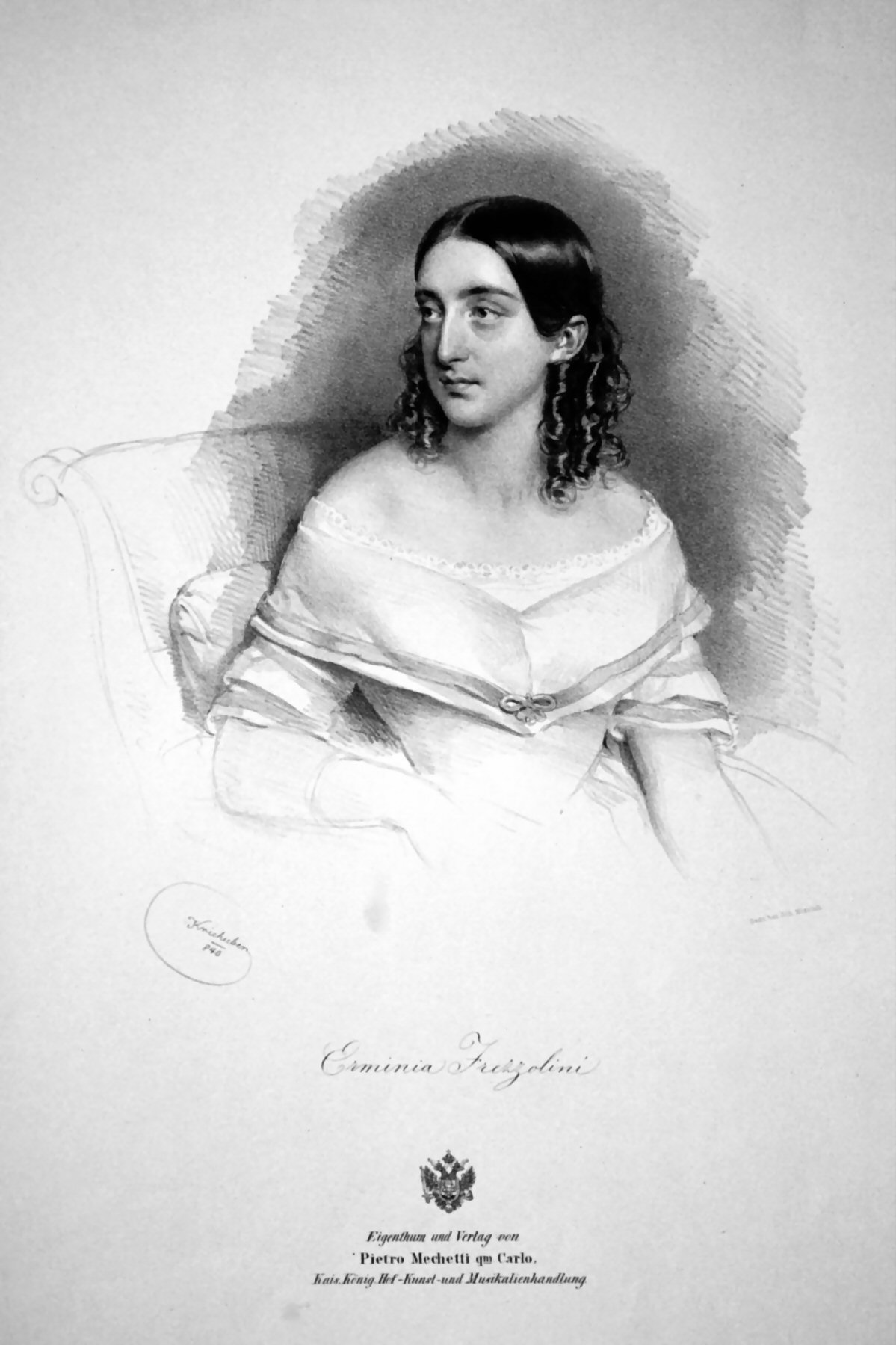
Erminia Frezzolini, the original Giselda

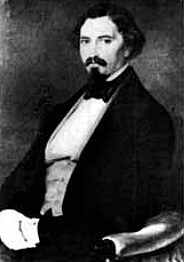
Carlo Guasco, the original Oronte

| Role | Voice type | Premiere cast, 11 February 1843 (Conductor: Eugenio Cavallini) |
|---|---|---|
| Arvino, son of Lord Folco | tenor | Giovanni Severi |
| Pagano/Hermit, son of Lord Folco | bass | Prosper Dérivis |
| Viclinda, wife of Arvino | soprano | Teresa Ruggeri |
| Giselda, daughter of Arvino | soprano | Erminia Frezzolini |
| Oronte, son of Acciano ruler of Antioch | tenor | Carlo Guasco |
| Acciano, ruler of Antioch | bass | Luigi Vairo |
| Sofia, wife of Acciano | soprano | Amalia Gandaglia |
| Pirro, Arvino's squire | bass | Gaetano Rossi |
| Prior of Milan | tenor | Napoleone Marconi |
Villagers of Milan, palace guards, crusaders, pilgrims, nuns, cut-throats, harem women, warriors – Chorus

== Synopsis ==
Time: 1095-99.
Place: Milan, in and around Antioch, and near Jerusalem

=== Act 1: La Vendetta ===
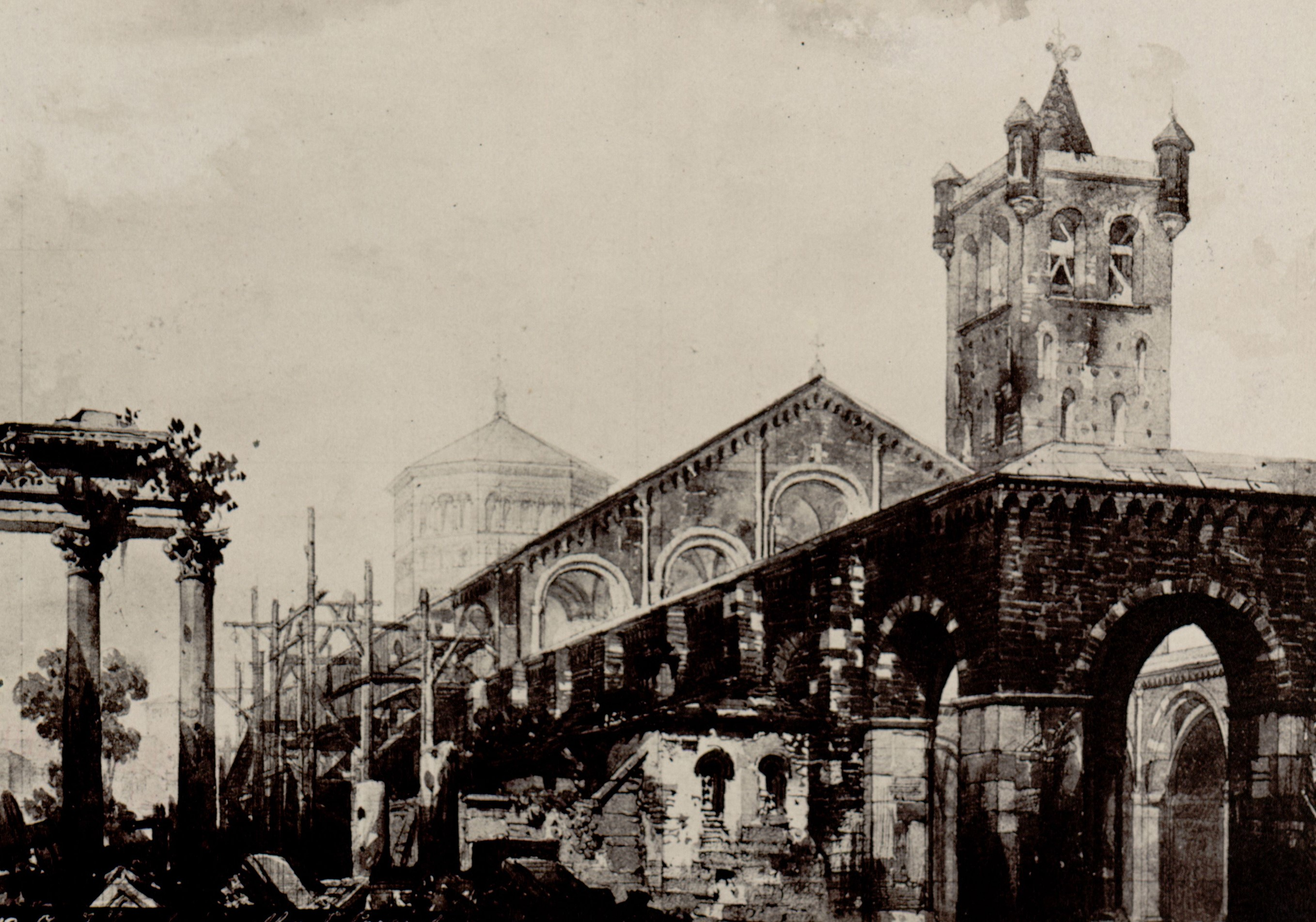
La Vendetta. La piazza di S. Ambrogio, set design for I Lombardi alla prima Crociata act 1 (1864).

Scene 1: A square outside the church of Sant' Ambrogio in Milan, 1095.

The two sons of Lord Folco, Pagano and Arvino, are reconciled, having previously feuded over which man would win the hand of Viclinda. Pagano, who once threatened the life of his brother, has returned from exile. A throng gathers in front of the church of Sant'Ambrogio to celebrate. Viclinda, now Arvino's wife, and their daughter Giselda are on hand to witness the reconciliation. A crusade to the Holy Land is announced and Arvino is to lead it. Pagano secretly vents his enduring frustration to Pirro, Arvino's squire: he still desires Viclinda (Sciagurata! hai tu creduto / "Wretched woman! Did you believe that I could forget you..."). As nuns sing in the background, Pirro and a gang of cut-throats agree to help Pagano take Viclinda for himself.

Scene 2: The Folco palace

Viclinda and Giselda are concerned about Pagano and his supposed reformation. Arvino asks them to watch his elderly father, Lord Folco, who is spending the night in Arvino's chambers. Giselda prays (Aria: Salve Maria / "Hail Mary!"). Pirro and Pagano and their assassins storm the palace. Pagano draws his sword and enters Arvino's chambers. He emerges with a bloody sword and with Viclinda in his custody. Arvino suddenly appears and Pagano is shocked to learn that in the darkness he has killed his father, not his brother (Orror! / "Horror! Dreadful monster of Hell..."). A throng calls for Pagano's death, but Giselda protests against more bloodshed. So Pagano is once again sent into exile.

=== Act 2: L'uomo della Caverna ===
Scene 1: Acciano's palace in Antioch, 1098.

Acciano and representatives from surrounding territories plot their continued resistance to the marauding crusaders. They have captured Giselda, who is now held captive within Acciano's harem. Sofia, Acciano's head wife and a secret Christian, enters with her son Oronte. Oronte has fallen in love with the captive Giselda (Aria: La mia letizia infondere / "Would that I could instill my gladness into her dear heart"). As Oronte sings of his love, Sofia sees Giselda as a means of converting her son to Christianity (Come poteva un angelo / "How could Heaven create an angel so pure").

Scene 2: A cave in the desert outside Antioch

A hermit waits for the arrival of the crusaders. A man appears at the cave and asks the hermit how he may receive forgiveness for his past sins. The man is Pirro, who has become a confidante of Acciano and now controls the gates of Antioch. The hermit counsels Pirro that he will achieve forgiveness if he opens the gates to the approaching crusaders. Thereafter, the crusaders, led by Arvino, appear at the cave. The hermit learns that Arvino's daughter has been captured by Acciano. The hermit assures them that they will succeed in taking Antioch.

Scene 3: Acciano's harem

The members of the harem sing of Giselda's luck in attracting the attentions of Oronte. As Giselda prays (Aria: Oh madre, dal cielo / "O mother, from heaven hear my lament") sudden shouts warn that the crusaders have invaded Antioch. Sofia rushes in to say that both Acciano and Oronte have been killed. Arvino enters with the hermit. Sofia identifies Arvino as the murderer of her husband and son. Giselda is horrified and recoils at her father's attempted embrace. She declares that this crusade was not the will of God. Arvino draws his sword and threatens to kill her for her blasphemy, but he is stopped by the hermit and Sofia. Arvino declares that his daughter has gone mad.

=== Act 3: La Conversione ===
Scene 1: The valley of Jehoshaphat; Jerusalem is in the distance, 1099.

The crusaders, joined by Christian pilgrims, sing of the beauty of Jerusalem and the Holy Land. Giselda has wandered away from her father's camp. Suddenly, Oronte appears! He was merely wounded, not killed, by Arvino's sword. Giselda and Oronte decide to flee together (Duet: Oh belle, a questa misera / "O Lombard tents, fair to this unhappy girl, farewell!").

Scene 2: Arvino's tent

Arvino rages against his daughter's betrayal. Soldiers arrive to tell him that Pagano has been seen in camp and they call for his capture and death. Arvino swears revenge with no mercy.

Scene 3: A grotto near the River Jordan

After a violin prelude, Giselda and Oronte appear. Oronte has been wounded and Giselda bitterly laments God's cruelty. The hermit appears. He tells Giselda and Oronte that their love is sinful but may be purified by Oronte's conversion and baptism. The hermit completes the baptism, and Giselda laments as Oronte dies from his wounds, promising to see her in heaven (Trio: Qual voluttà trascorrere / "What wondrous pleasure I feel").

=== Act 4: Il Santo Sepolcro ===
Scene 1: A cave, near Jerusalem

As Giselda dreams, Oronte appears to her in a vision and tells her that God has granted his prayer: the crusaders will find strength in the waters of the fountain of Siloam (Aria: In cielo benedetto / "Through you, Giselda, I am blessed in heaven"). Giselda wakes and sings of her miraculous vision (Aria: Qual prodigio ... Non fu sogno! / "A miracle!... It was not a dream").

Scene 2: The Lombards' tents

The crusaders and pilgrims are despairing that God has abandoned them in the desert (O signore, dal tetto natio / "O Lord, Thou dids't call us"). Giselda rushes in, announcing the discovery of a spring of water. As all rejoice, Arvino assures his crusaders of his confidence that they will now take Jerusalem.

Scene 3: Arvino's tent

Dying from wounds, the hermit is brought in by Giselda and Arvino. The hermit reveals that he is really Pagano. In his dying moments, he confesses to Arvino his penitence for their father's murder and begs forgiveness. Arvino embraces his brother, and Pagano asks for a final view of the Holy City. As Jerusalem appears in the distance, Pagano dies, and the crusaders praise heaven (Te lodiamo, gran Dio di vittoria / "We praise Thee, great God of Victory").

== Music ==
Rousing choruses, vocal ensembles with the varying characters differentiated through the music, and marches with the stage band are a feature of this work. The chorus "O Signore, dal tetto natio", like its counterpart the Chorus of Hebrew Slaves in Verdi's previous opera Nabucco, became extremely and deservedly popular. There is an unusually extended orchestral introduction with solo violin in three sections before the "Baptism" trio "Qual voluttà trascorrere" with the solo violin also prominent in the closing section of that trio. The character of Giselda comes across with striking individuality due to the music Verdi composed for her. Giselda's prayer is scored with a chamber-music texture — eight violins, two violas, one bass, solo flute and clarinet — contrasting markedly with the grandiose orchestral forces deployed elsewhere in the opera, and recalling the intimate scoring of Zaccaria's prayer in Nabucco. The transition into the aria is entirely fluid, with Giselda's opening line Te, Vergin, santa, invoco! echoing her father's preceding command both rhythmically and tonally — an unusual entrance for a prima donna's first-act aria — and her initial fear is conveyed through fragmented melodic lines and what musicologist Francesco Izzo has described as "unusually nuanced harmonic progressions" moving from D major toward the minor of the mediant.

== Recordings ==
| Year | Cast (Arvino, Pagano, Viclinda, Giselda, Oronte) | Conductor, Opera House and Orchestra | Label |
|---|---|---|---|
| 1951 | Aldo Bertocci, Mario Petri, Miriam Pirazzini, Maria Vitale, Gustavo Gallo | Manno Wolf-Ferrari, Orchestra Sinfonica e Coro della Rai di Milano | CD: Warner Fonit |
| 1969 | Umberto Grilli; Ruggero Raimondi; Anna di Stasio; Renata Scotto, Luciano Pavarotti | Gianandrea Gavazzeni, Rome Opera Orchestra | CD: Opera D'oro; ASIN: B00000FBRS |
| 1971 | Jerome Lo Monaco; Ruggero Raimondi; Desdemona Malvisi; Cristina Deutekom, Plácido Domingo | Lamberto Gardelli, Royal Philharmonic Orchestra and Ambrosian Singers | CD: Philips; Cat: 000942602 |
| 1972 | José Carreras; Renata Scotto; Franco Marini; Paul Plishka, Annette Parker, Will Roy, Yoshi Ito | Eve Queler, Opera Orchestra of New York and Sarah Lawrence College Chorus (Recorded at Carnegie Hall, July 12, 1972) | CD: foyer Laudis srl Milano; Cat: 2-CF 2051 |
| 1984 | Giorgio Lamberti; Sylvia Sass; Kolos Kováts; Gregor József; Jász Klári; Ezio di Cesare | Lamberto Gardelli, Hungarian State Opera Orchestra and Hungarian Radio and Television Chorus | CD: Hungaroton; Cat: SLPD 12498-500 |
| 1984 | Carlo Bini, Silvano Carroli, Luisa Vannini, Ghena Dimitrova, José Carreras | Gianandrea Gavazzeni, Orchestra and chorus of the Teatro alla Scala, Milan, (Recorded at La Scala, April) | DVD: Warner Music Vision, Cat: 0927 44927 1 Kultur, Cat: D 2036 |
| 1993 | Bruno Beccaria, Samuel Ramey, Inma Egido, Lauren Flanigan, Luciano Pavarotti | James Levine, Metropolitan Opera Orchestra and Chorus (Recorded live, 21 December 1993; production: Mark Lamos) | Streaming video: Met Opera on Demand |
| 1996 | Richard Leech, Samuel Ramey, Patricia Racette, June Anderson, Luciano Pavarotti | James Levine, Metropolitan Opera Orchestra and Chorus (Studio recording) | CD: Decca; Cat: 455 287-2 |
| 2001 | Francesco Piccoli, Giorgio Surjan, Graziella Merrino, Dimitra Theodossiou, Massimo Giordano | Tiziano Severini, Orchestra I Pommeriggi Musicali di Milano and Coro del Circuito Lirico Lombardo, (Recorded at performances in the Teatro Ponchielli di Cremona, 16,18 November) | CD: Dynamic CDS 390/1-2 |
| 2009 | Roberto di Biasio, Michele Pertusi, Christina Giannelli, Dimitra Theodossiou, Francesco Meli | Daniele Calligari, Teatro Regio di Parma Orchestra and Chorus (Recording of a performance(s) at the Teatro Regio, January) | DVD & Blu-ray: C-Major, Cat: 721808 |
| 2018 | Giuseppe Gipali, Alex Esposito, Lavinia Bini, Angela Meade, Francesco Meli | Michele Mariotti, Teatro Regio Torino Orchestra and Chorus (Recorded live, April 2018; stage director: Stefano Mazzonis di Pralafera) | Blu-ray/DVD: Dynamic; CD: Dynamic; Cat: B07HSKMMY6 |
