= Thais St. Julien =

American soprano (1945–2019)

Thaïs St. Julien (June 11, 1945 – January 3, 2019) was a soprano from New Orleans. She studied under Charles Paddock, Virginia MacWatters and Norma Newton, and was Co-Director (with Milton G. Scheuermann, Jr) of the New Orleans Musica da Camera, which specialises in music of the Middle Ages and the Renaissance, and has toured throughout the Gulf South. She was also Foundress of Vox Feminæ, the female choral extension of the MdC.

St. Julien also appeared with The New Opera Theatre (as Dido in Dido and Æneas, her New York debut at Symphony Space, 1988), Pro Arte Chorale (Amor in a Concert Version of Orfeo ed Euridice, opposite Derek Lee Ragin), Louisiana Philharmonic Orchestra (Messiah), Great Neck Choral Society, International Dvořák Festival, Lyric Opera of Dallas, New Orleans Opera Association, Southwest Chamber Orchestra, Jefferson Performing Arts Society (Bach's Magnificat), etc.

In 1997, the soprano was Dircé in the Opera Quotannis Médée, opposite Phyllis Treigle and D'Anna Fortunato, at Alice Tully Hall, Lincoln Center. This was the uncut, original opéra-comique version of the Cherubini masterpiece, and St. Julien was possibly the only singer in the twentieth century to sing the florid, difficult role complete and unadulterated.

Together with Professor Scheuermann, St. Julien co-hosted the influential Early Music radio show Continuum. The two have hosted the weekly program since 1976, producing over 2,000 programs. At forty-two years, Continuum is the longest-running Early Music radio program in America, if not the world. The program has been a winner of the Early Music America/Millennium of Music National Radio Competition, and received the KXMS Fine Arts Radio International Award.

She was the recipient of the 2007 Louisiana Artist Fellowship in Music. In April 2017, St. Julien was diagnosed with Alzheimer's disease, the effects from which she died on January 3, 2019, at the age of 73.

== Discography ==
- Cherubini: Médée (P.Treigle, Fortunato; Folse, 1997) Newport Classic

Musica da Camera Discography

- "Satires, Desires & Excesses" (1992) Centaur
- "Natus est" (1994) Centaur
- "The Cross of Red" (1996) Centaur
- "Maiden, Mother, Muse" (1998) Centaur
- "Les motés d'Arras" (Fithian; 2000) Centaur
- "Ah, Sweet Lady" (1974–2009) Belle Alliance
