= Bruno Prevedi =

Italian opera singer

Bruno Prevedi (photo with 1961 dedication)

Bruno Prevedi (21 December 1928 – 12 January 1988) was an Italian tenor, particularly associated with the Italian repertory.

== Life and career ==
Prevedi was born at Revere, now in Borgo Mantovano, province of Mantua. He studied in Mantua with Alberto Sorenisa and in Milan with Vladimiro Badiali. He made his debut as a baritone in 1958, as Tonio, but quickly retrained himself as a tenor, and made a second debut in 1959, as Turiddu, again at the Teatro Nuovo in Milan.

He sang widely in Italy, and made his debut at La Scala in 1962, in Pizzetti's Debora e Jaele. He also appeared in Berlin, Munich, Vienna, Budapest, London, and Buenos Aires. He played the role of Pollione in the opera Norma by Vincenzo Bellini in the Gran Teatro del Liceo in Barcelona during the winter season 1962-1963 (I Festival de Festivales de Opera).

He made his Metropolitan Opera debut on 6 March 1965 as Cavaradossi in Tosca, in five seasons his roles included: Alfredo, Manrico, Riccardo, Alvaro, Don Carlo, and Radames.

He can be heard on a number of recordings for Decca, including in complete performances of Verdi's Nabucco, opposite Tito Gobbi and Elena Suliotis, in Macbeth, opposite Giuseppe Taddei and Birgit Nilsson, and Medea, opposite Gwyneth Jones, as well as a recital of tenor arias.

He died in Milan.

== Sources ==
- The Metropolitan Opera Encyclopedia, edited by David Hamilton, (Simon & Schuster, New York, 1987), ISBN 0-671-61732-X
