= Sylvia Sass =

Hungarian operatic soprano (born 1951)

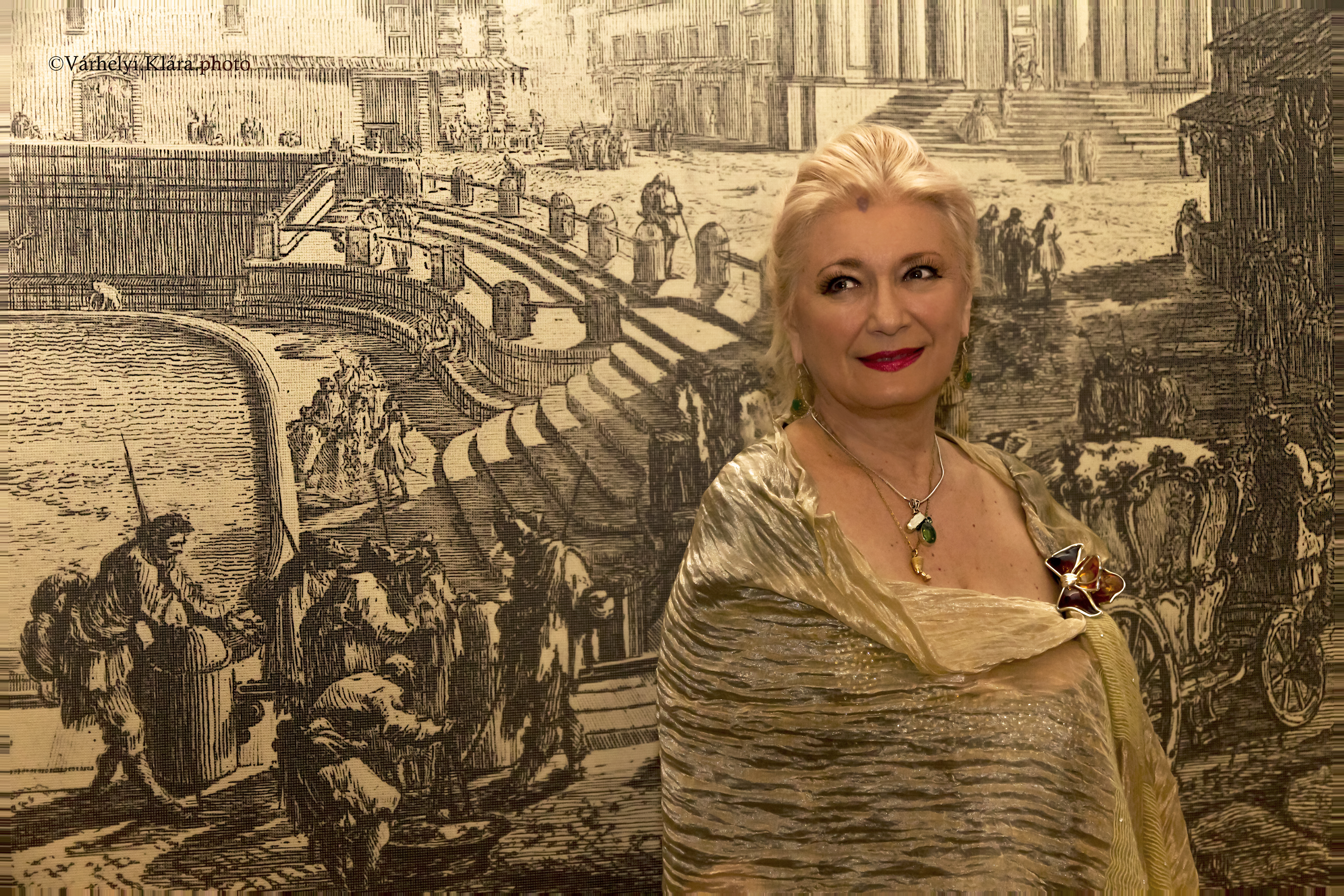
- Born: 12 July 1951 (age 75); Budapest, Hungary
- Occupation: Opera singer (soprano)

Sylvia Sass (born 12 July 1951) is a Hungarian operatic soprano who has sung leading roles both in her native country and internationally.

== Life and career ==
Born in Budapest, Sass studied at Franz Liszt Academy of Music in Budapest with Olga Révhegyi and Pál Varga. She made her professional debut at the Hungarian State Opera, as Frasquita in Bizet's Carmen, in 1971. The following year, she appeared at the Sofia National Opera, as Violetta in La traviata, and during the 1974-75 season at the Salzburg Festival singing Mozart in concert.

In 1975, she sang at the Scottish Opera, as Desdemona in Verdi's Otello, and in 1976, made her debut at the Royal Opera House in London, in a performance as Giselda in I Lombardi, returning the following season as Violetta Valéry. In 1977, she made her only appearances at the Metropolitan Opera in New York, in Tosca (opposite José Carreras and Ingvar Wixell). She also appeared at the Vienna State Opera, the Munich State Opera, the Teatro Municipal de Caracas as Amelia in Un ballo in maschera, at the opera houses of Cologne, Frankfurt, Berlin, Hamburg, as well as the Paris Opera and the Aix-en-Provence Festival, both as Violetta. In 1978, she made her debut at the Teatro alla Scala in Milan, as Puccini's Manon Lescaut (with Plácido Domingo), conducted by Georges Prêtre and directed by Piero Faggioni, a performance that was televised live across Europe. In 1983, she portrayed Giorgetta in Il tabarro at that theatre, conducted by Gianandrea Gavazzeni.

Her repertory also included Donna Anna in Don Giovanni, Fiordiligi in Così fan tutte, Mimi in La bohème, Judith in Béla Bartók's Bluebeard's Castle, etc., but she was particularly noted in early Verdi operas, especially as Lady Macbeth.

Sass has won many awards, the first in 1972 when she won first prize at the Kodály Voice Competition. In 1973, she won the Grand Prix as Violetta at the International Opera Competition for Young Singers. In 1974, she won the Silver Medal at the International Tchaikovsky Competition, in Moscow. She was also made an Artist of Merit of the Hungarian People's Republic in 1977.

Sass has made several recordings of arias, Lieder, and complete operas, notably Bluebeard's Castle and Don Giovanni, both conducted by Sir Georg Solti, Verdi's I Lombardi, Ernani, Attila, Macbeth, Stiffelio, all conducted by Lamberto Gardelli, as well as Cherubini's Médée (in the Italian version), again with Gardelli, Richard Strauss's Four Last Songs and Richard Wagner's Wesendonck Lieder.

She was awarded the Kossuth Prize in 2017.

== Sources ==
- Operissimo.com
- Interview with Sylvia Sass, July 2012, Opera Lively
