= Opera in New Orleans =

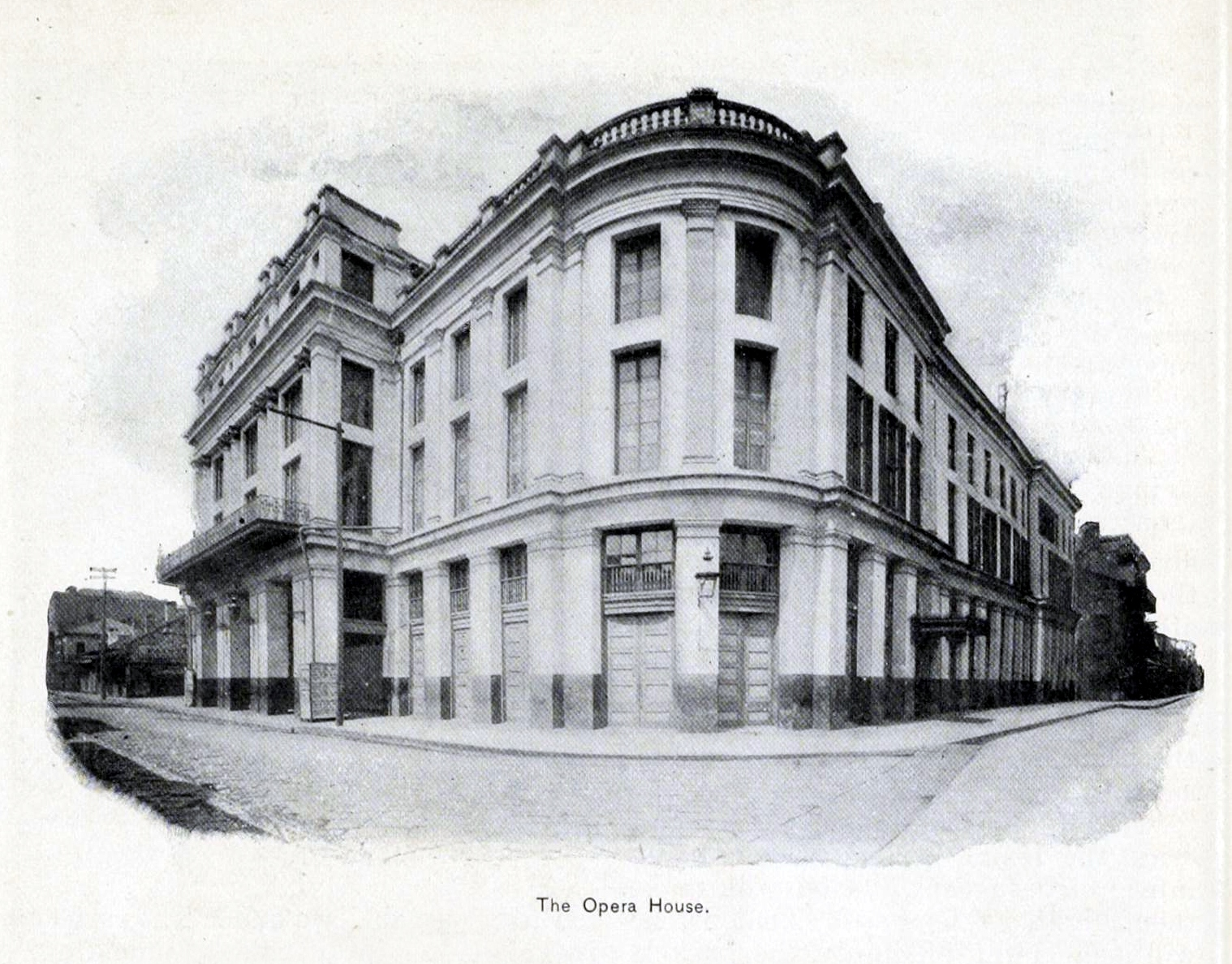
The old French Opera House

Opera has long been part of the musical culture of New Orleans, Louisiana. Operas have regularly been performed in the city since the 1790s, and since the early 19th century, New Orleans has had a resident company regularly performing opera in addition to theaters hosting traveling performers and companies.

== Earlier opera houses ==
Operas were staged at a variety of theaters in the city, the first documented was André Grétry's Sylvain at the Theatre de la Rue Saint Pierre on May 22, 1796. On January 30, 1808, the Théâtre St. Philippe was opened with the U.S. premiere of Étienne Méhul's Une folie. The U.S. premiere of Luigi Cherubini's Les deux journées took place at this theater on March 12, 1811. The city's most famous opera venue between 1819 and 1859 was the Théâtre d'Orléans. That theater was succeeded in 1859 by the French Opera House, located on Bourbon Street in the French Quarter. Living in a cosmopolitan city, New Orleans' inhabitants, whether high in status or low, imported or indigenous, constituted a highly receptive audience.

The French Opera House burned down in 1919, causing severe disruption to opera in the city. When attempts to arrange financing for rebuilding failed, the company disbanded. For a generation, most opera in New Orleans was presented by touring companies at various local theaters.

== The modern era ==
In 1943, the New Orleans Opera Association was formed, and succeeded in securing a resident company in the city. Over the years, many noted singers have appeared with the company (see List of opera singers).

Since World War II, various companies have toured to New Orleans. In 1947, the Metropolitan Opera visited with their productions of Le nozze di Figaro (with Ezio Pinza and Eleanor Steber), La traviata (with Bidu Sayão) and Lucia di Lammermoor (with Patrice Munsel). They returned in 1972, with Otello (with James McCracken and Sherrill Milnes), Faust (with Plácido Domingo and Ruggero Raimondi), La traviata (with Anna Moffo) and La fille du régiment (with Dame Joan Sutherland and Luciano Pavarotti).

The Opera Association has presented two world premieres: Carlisle Floyd's Markheim (with Norman Treigle and Audrey Schuh, 1966) and Thea Musgrave's Pontalba (conducted by Robert Lyall, 2003).

In November 1967, the American National Opera Company presented two operas in New Orleans: Lulu and Tosca (the latter with Marie Collier), both in productions staged by Sarah Caldwell.

In 1975, the New Orleans Opera Association staged the epic Les Huguenots with Marisa Galvany, Rita Shane, Susanne Marsee, Enrico di Giuseppe, Dominic Cossa, and Paul Plishka heading the cast.

As part of the 1984 Louisiana World Exposition, the English National Opera gave performances of Rigoletto (in Sir Jonathan Miller's well-known production), Patience and Gloriana.

Also based in New Orleans, though short-lived, The New Opera Theatre (1986–1990) presented two world premieres as well as experimental productions of standard repertory. Their staging of Dido and Æneas toured to New York (Symphony Space), where it was acclaimed. Featured singers with this ensemble included Cyril and Libbye Hellier, Tracey Mitchell, Natalia Rom, Thaïs St Julien, Phyllis Treigle, and Susannah Waters.

In 1992, New York-based Opera Quotannis brought their production of New Orleans-born composer Louise LaBruyère's Everyman to the Crescent City, with Mitchell in the title role.

Hurricane Katrina, in 2005, flooded the Theatre for the Performing Arts and the season was cancelled, but the New Orleans Opera has since returned.

On January 17, 2009, the New Orleans Opera, directed by Robert Lyall, performed with Plácido Domingo in a gala reopening of New Orleans' Mahalia Jackson Theater of the Performing Arts. The master of ceremonies was New Orleans native Patricia Clarkson.

Harry Robert Lyall, conductor and administrator, died on January 5, 2024, at the age of 75.

On January 18, 2024, the New Orleans Opera Association announced librettist and director Lila Palmer as their new artistic and general director. She replaced Clare Burovac, who previously led the company for three years.

== Seasons ==
Season dates	Productions				
2006–2007	Le nozze di Figaro	Lucia di Lammermoor	La bohème		
2007–2008	Faust	Il trittico	Rigoletto	West Side Story	
2008–2009	Manon Lescaut	Don Giovanni	Carmen	La traviata	
2009–2010	Tosca	Roméo et Juliette	Verdi Requiem	Der fliegende Holländer	
2010–2011	Porgy and Bess	Die Zauberflöte	Les pêcheurs de perles	Il trovatore	
2011–2012	Turandot	Un ballo in maschera	Salome	Pagliacci & Carmina Burana	
2012–2013	The Barber of Seville	Samson et Dalila	Madama Butterfly		
2013–2014	Der Vampyr	Noye's Fludde	Cendrillon	La bohème	
2014–2015	Carmen	Rusalka	Lucia di Lammermoor	Le nozze di Figaro	
2015–2016	La traviata	Die Fledermaus	Dead Man Walking	Tosca	
2016–2017	Don Giovanni	Macbeth	Sweeney Todd	Faust	
2017–2018	Cavalleria rusticana / Pagliacci	Orpheus in the Underworld	The Burlesque Opera of Tabasco	Champion	
2018–2019	Turandot	Rigoletto	Pygmalion	The Abduction from the Seraglio	The Blind
2019–2020	Carmen	Joan of Arc	The Falling and The Rising	The Magic Flute (canceled COVID 19)	
2020–2021	Madama Butterfly (canceled COVID 19)	Fidelio and Charlie Parker's Yardbird (canceled COVID 19)	The Guild Home Concert – digital	The Medium – digital	Porgy and Bess – concert
2021–2022	Die Walküre, act 1	Josephine	Gala Concert	La bohème	
2022–2023	The Barber of Seville	Hansel and Gretel	Charlie Parker's Yardbird	Madame Butterfly	
2023–2024	The Marriage of Figaro	Blue	Lisette Oropesa in Concert	Lucia di Lammermoor	
