= The New Opera Theatre =

Opera company based in New Orleans, Louisiana, USA

The New Opera Theatre was a New Orleans–based opera company founded in 1986, with conductor Louise LaBruyère as Music Director and stage director Brian Morgan serving as Artistic Director. It specialized in experimental productions of both ancient and contemporary opera.

The ensemble's first production was in April 1987, the world-premiere of Morgan's post-minimalist opera, s ("a concerto for stage director"), with Phyllis Treigle as E, and LaBruyère conducting.

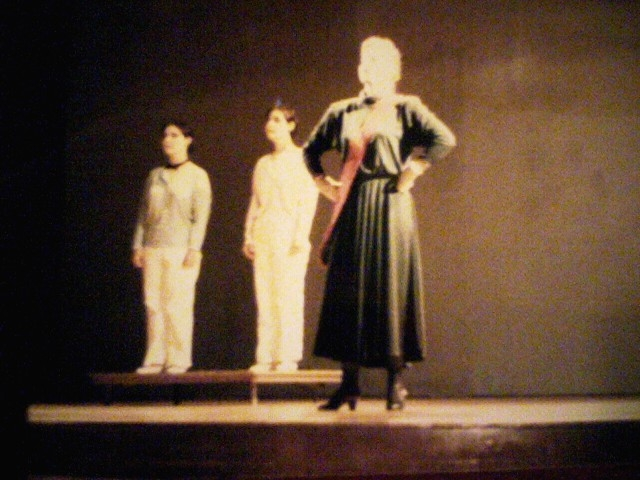
Libbye & Cyril Hellier in Hänsel und Gretel, with Suzanne Duplantis as the Witch.

This was followed later the same year by Hänsel und Gretel, with identical-twins Libbye and Cyril Hellier in the title roles. In 1988, The NOT produced, in collaboration with I Cantori di New York, Dido and Æneas, with Thaïs St Julien as Dido and Susannah Waters as Belinda, with Bart Folse conducting. The production was first seen at New York City's Symphony Space, then in New Orleans.

In 1989, The NOT presented the New Orleans premiere of Pelléas et Mélisande (with Tracey Mitchell as Mélisande), which was followed by Bastien und Bastienne, and the world-premiere of Dr LaBruyère's Everyman, after the mediaeval Morality Play.

The New Opera Theatre's final presentation was of a Benefit Concert, in the fall of 1989, featuring Natalia Rom. Folse and Morgan went on to found Opera Quotannis, in New York.
