= Médée =

Dramatic tragedy by Pierre Corneille

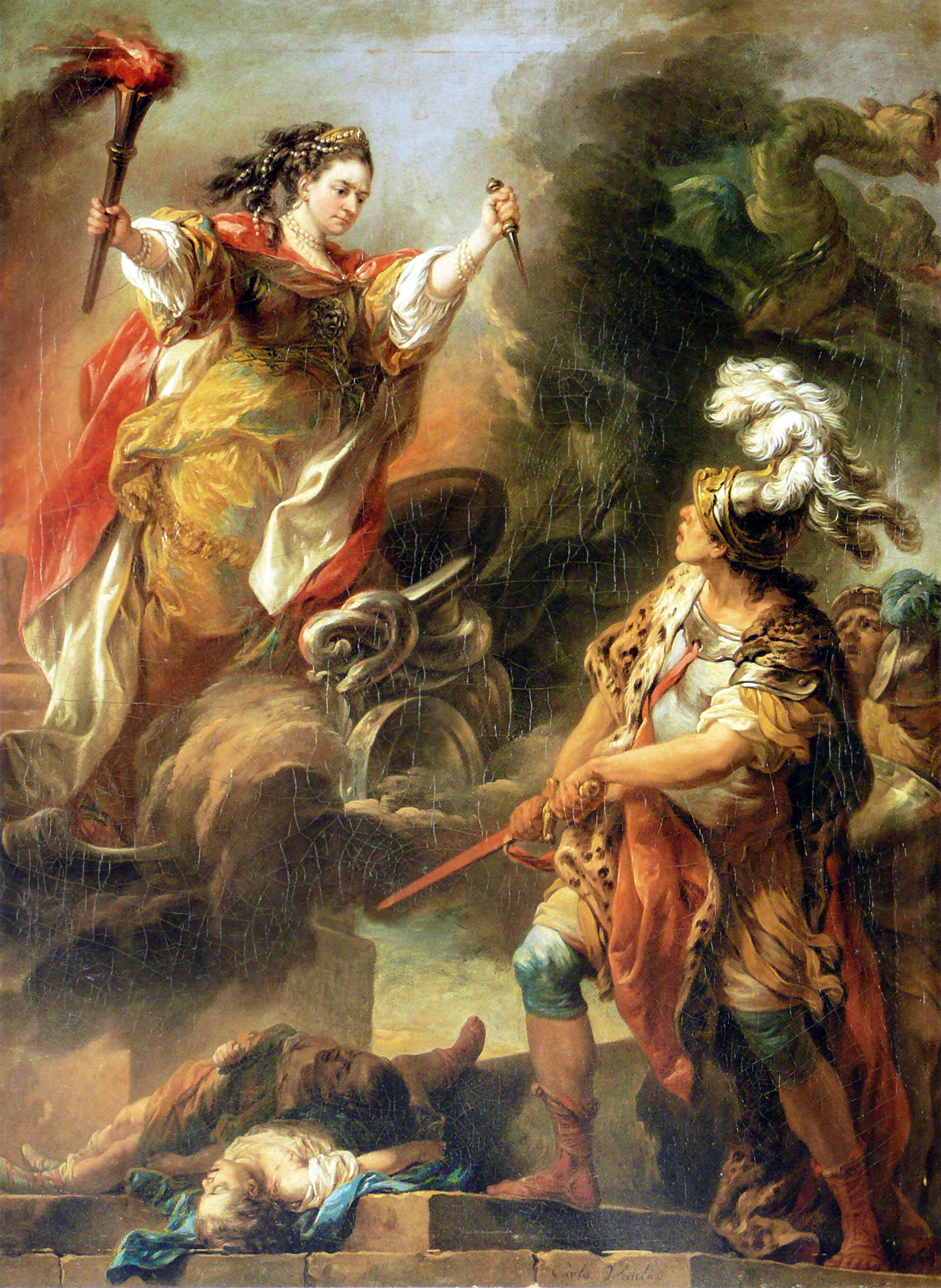
- Mademoiselle Clairon in Médée by Charles-André van Loo, 1759
- Written by: Pierre Corneille
- Characters: Médée; Créon; Ægée; Jason; Pollux; Créuse
- Setting: Corinth

Médée is a dramatic tragedy in five acts written in alexandrine verse by Pierre Corneille, first performed in 1635 at the Théâtre du Marais. Corneille was inspired by both the Seneca and Euripedes tellings.

== Summary ==
Jason tells his friend Pollux that he plans to marry a princess of Corinth named Créuse. Pollux, knowing that Jason is married to Médée, asks him if Médée is still alive. Jason confirms that Médée is still alive and admits that Médée will be heartbroken over his decision to leave her. Pollux is surprised, noting that Médée has helped Jason with her magic on multiple occasions. Jason recounts how Médée used her magic to make Jason’s father youthful again but, in doing so, convinces the daughters of an enemy of Jason’s (Pélias), to kill their father. Pélias son, Acaste, takes the crown and blames Jason and Médée for the death of his father. Jason and Médée, thus, run away to Corinth. Acaste demands Jason be arrested and sent to him but Créon, the king of Corinth, is only willing to exile Médée. Jason rationalizes his decision, claiming that marrying Créuse would put him in good standing with Créon and thus guarantee the safety of Médée and their children. Pollux remains unconvinced by Jason’s reasoning and implores him to think about the possible consequences for upsetting Médée.

Jason goes to speak with Créuse and, after they declare their love for each other, Jason asks Créuse if she could ask Créon to not exile his children when he ultimately decides to exile Médée. Créuse agrees to help but only in return for a favor that she does not disclose to Jason. Médée learns of Jason’s plans and of her imminent exile and, furious, Médée declares her revenge on Jason. Médée’s attendant Nérine, tries to calm Médée’s wrath but Médée is insistant on revenge. Médée thinks about how she fled Thessaly after helping Jason kill Pélias and blames herself, in part, for Jason meeting Créuse. Médée still loves Jason and is unwilling to kill him. Médée, instead, plans to kill Créon and Créuse because she believes that they are the true source of Jason’s betrayal.

Médée confronts Créon about the unfair nature of her punishment. While she has committed many crimes, Médée questions the justice of Créon’s decision to exile only her when Jason was the benefactor and collaborator in most of her crimes. Créon is taken aback by Médée’s lack of supplication to his authority and remains unconvinced. He orders Médée to leave her children with Jason before she is exiled.

Créon becomes assured of the safety of Corinth now that Acaste has been sated by the exile of Médée but notes that there is still one problem: Ægée, the elderly king of Athens was hoping for Créuse’s hand in marriage but, now that Créuse is intending to marry Jason, he worries that he will earn Ægée, and Athens’ wrath. Créon asks Créuse to show Ægée respect, even though she intends to reject him. Jason thanks Créuse for choosing him over a king and Créuse admits that Jason is not all she’s interested in. Ever since Jason arrived with Médée, Créuse has coveted Médée’s dress. Créuse is so obsessed with obtaining this dress that she claims she doesn’t even care about the Golden Fleece and would pay the entire treasury of her father in order to get Médée’s dress. Créuse finally reveals the favor she wanted of Jason in return for assuring the protection of his children, and it is for Jason to barter for the dress from Médée. Jason promises that the dress will be hers. When Créuse meets with Ægée, she attempts to soften her rejection of him by framing her choice as being something noble and patriotic. This offends Ægée and he leaves, threatening war on Corinth.

Jason talks to Nérine about his plan to barter for the dress. He plans to argue that Médée owes Créuse for not exiling her children with her, and that the dress would make a perfect gift. Jason continues by arguing that Créuse is willing to pay a large sum for the dress, so it is altogether better for Médée to sell her dress and “acquérir de quoi faire la Reine” (acquire the means to live like a queen). As Médée arrives, Jason leaves because he is still afraid to talk to Médée. He asks Nérine to barter for him. Médée corners Jason and forces him to explain himself. Jason admits that he loves Créuse but claims that he is not in the wrong, since he helped Médée get a reasonable punishment and kept their children from being exiled. Médée disagrees. Médée argues that Jason is a traitor and a cheater and that her punishment is not a mercy. After Jason leaves Médée concludes that Jason’s weakness is his children and that if she wants to hurt Jason, then she’ll have to hurt his children.

Médée plans to kill Créuse by pretending to gift her the dress she covets which Médée has filled with poison. While preparing to send the “gift”, Médée is told that Ægée attempted to kidnap Créuse but was thwarted by Jason and now is imprisoned in Corinth. Upon hearing this, Médée plans to free Ægée and find asylum in Athens after she kills Créuse. Meanwhile Créon is celebrating with Jason and Pollux for defeating Ægée and exiling Médée claiming that Corinth is now safe from all dangers. Pollux warns Créon not to underestimate Médée.

Créon receives the gift of the poisoned dress and Pollux correctly guesses that the dress is poisoned, knowing Médée to be a master of poisons. Créon, taking this warning seriously, decides to test the dress on a prisoner first. Médée, meanwhile, finds Ægée who is lamenting about being set to be executed by his enemies. Médée frees him and he offers her asylum in Athens along with an army to get revenge on Jason and Créon. Médée refuses his help because she insists on delivering her own revenge.

Médée stops a messenger named Theudas and asks him what happened with the dress. Theudas tells her that the dress was tested on a prisoner but nothing happened so Créon deemed it safe. Créuse immediately put on the dress and burst into flames. Attempting to help her, Créon is also engulfed by the flames. Médée is pleased that her magic worked the way she intended. Médée wonders if the two deaths are enough to satisfy her revenge and she quickly decides that she is not satisfied. After arguing with herself, she decides she will kill her own children to make Jason suffer, not only as a lover but as a father. Jason, upon discovering the deaths of Créuse and Créon, vows revenge on Médée. Jason contemplates killing their own children in order to make Médée suffer as a mother but ultimately finds this plan absurd. In their ultimate confrontation, Médée reveals to Jason that she killed their children. Jason attempts to get Médée arrested but she flies away on a chariot drawn by dragons, leaving Jason devastated and powerless below. Jason contemplates getting revenge on Médée but ultimately decides that it would be impossible. Deciding that he wants to join Créuse in death, Jason kills himself.

== In Pierre Corneille's career ==
Médée was Corneille's first tragedy. Furthermore, the performances of Médée followed Corneille's expulsion from Richelieu's prestigious group of five authors. The playwright no longer had the protection of Richelieu, who, resentful, greeted Corneille's first tragedy with disapproval. During its installation, the play's reception was indifferent, leading to only eight productions by the end of the 18th century.

Corneille himself was displeased with many aspects of Médée. In his Exemen, written twenty years after the first production of Médée, Corneille lists some of his issues with the play, including a bloated fifth act and the addition of Ægée as a character. Corneille also admits, "je vous donne Médée, toute mecnante qu'elle est, et ne vous dirai rien pour sa justification." [I gave you Médée, all the wickedness that she is, and never gave you her justification].
