= Natalia Rom =

Russian-born soprano

- Born: 14 May 1950 (age 76); Kazan, Soviet Union
- Origin: Perm, Soviet Union
- Genres: Opera
- Occupations: Soprano; Soloist

Natalia Rom, soprano, was born in Kazan, in the Soviet Union (also the city of Feodor Chaliapin's birth), on May 14, 1950, and graduated (as a conductor) from the Leningrad Conservatory. In late 1976, she emigrated to New Orleans, where she attended Loyola University's College of Music, and studied voice with Patricia Havranek. In 1979, she made her professional debut in a small role in the New Orleans Opera Association's Die Zauberflöte. That same year, she won the Metropolitan Opera National Council Auditions. In 1980, she sang the title role in Aïda, for the Seattle Opera.

The soprano's Metropolitan Opera debut was as Mimì in La bohème (in 1983, with Patricia Craig, Dano Raffanti, Richard Stilwell, Mario Sereni, James Morris, and Italo Tajo, conducted by James Levine), subsequently performing Tatiana in Eugene Onegin (opposite Leo Nucci and Paul Plishka) and Emma in the new production of Khovanschina (with Martti Talvela) at the house. She returned to New Orleans in 1989 for Aïda, then Tatiana (with Yuri Mazurok) in 1995. In New York, she studied under Dick Marzollo.

She also appeared with Opera North (her European debut, in Andrei Șerban's Il trovatore, then La traviata, and Madama Butterfly), Scottish Opera (Madama Butterfly), Lyric Opera of Chicago (Madama Butterfly), Teatro Massimo in Palermo (Tosca), Opéra de Montréal (Aïda), Dallas Opera (Pagliacci), Savonlinna Opera Festival (Aïda), Deutsche Oper Berlin (Aïda), Arena di Verona (Aïda), Teatro Filarmonico in Verona (Madama Butterfly), Athens International Festival (Aïda), Municipal Theater of Santiago (Eugene Onegin, directed by Hugo de Ana), Opéra de Nice (Pagliacci), Teatro di San Carlo (Madama Butterfly), Ludwigshafen Festival (Madama Butterfly), Cleveland Opera (Aïda), Opera de Puerto Rico (Madama Butterfly), Calgary Opera (Manon Lescaut), Connecticut Grand Opera (Aïda and Tosca), San Francisco Opera (Tosca), Florentine Opera (Manon Lescaut), Opera/Columbus (Don Carlos), Nashville Opera (Pagliacci), and New Jersey State Opera (Pagliacci). In 1999, she portrayed Élisabeth de Valois in Don Carlos, at the Palm Beach Opera.

In concert, the soprano has been heard with Utah Opera (Act I of Otello, with James McCracken), Baltimore Symphony Orchestra (Pique-dame), Cincinnati May Festival (conducted by James Conlon), Houston Symphony, Pro Arte Chorale (Verdi Requiem), Pro Musica Chamber Orchestra of Columbus (Shostakovich's Symphony No.14), Dallas Opera, Ravinia Festival (with Levine at the piano), and The New Opera Theatre.

Mme Rom may be seen on the DVD of the Met's 1984 production of Francesca da Rimini (as Biancofiore), with Renata Scotto, Plácido Domingo, and Cornell MacNeil.
