= Salvador Novoa =

Mexican dramatic tenor

Salvador Novoa (born in Mexico City, Mexico, on October 30, 1937; died on December 7, 2021) was a Mexican dramatic tenor. He was especially known for the operas of Alberto Ginastera.

Novoa made his operatic debut with the Instituto Nacional de Las Bellas Artes in Mexico City, in 1960, as B.F. Pinkerton in Madama Butterfly. With that company, he also appeared in Aida, Carmen, Il trovatore, and Pagliacci. Later, in 1979, he sang the title role of Otello at that theatre. His first great success occurred in 1967, when he created the role of Pier Francesco Orsini in Ginastera's Bomarzo, for the Opera Society of Washington.

== New York City Opera ==
He began his tenure with the New York City Opera in 1966, where he appeared regularly until 1972, in Tosca (with Sherrill Milnes as Scarpia), Carmen (opposite Huguette Tourangeau), Gianni Schicchi (with Norman Treigle and Beverly Sills), Der Rosenkavalier (with Elisabeth Grümmer), La traviata, Bomarzo (in its New York premiere), Lucia di Lammermoor (with Sills), Don Rodrigo (of Ginastera), and Mefistofele (with Treigle).

In 1974, Novoa sang in a Concert Version of Mefistofele, alongside Treigle and Nancy Shade, at London's Royal Festival Hall. The tenor also sang with major companies in Buenos Aires (Bomarzo at the Teatro Colón), Toronto, Vancouver, Marseille, Stuttgart, Boston, Chicago, Cincinnati, Fort Worth, Houston, Omaha, Philadelphia, Portland, and San Diego. In 1978, he sang in Nabucco, in New Orleans, with Kostas Paskalis, Rita Hunter, and Ferruccio Furlanetto.

In 2021, the tenor died at the age of eighty-four.

== Discography ==
- Ginastera: Bomarzo (Penagos, Simon, Turner, Torigi, Devlin; Rudel, 1967) CBS
