= D'Anna Fortunato =

American mezzo-soprano

D'Anna Fortunato (born in Pittsburgh, Pennsylvania, on February 21, 1945) is an American mezzo-soprano. She has long been an admired favorite on the American orchestral-concert scene, while establishing herself as a respected operatic artist as well. Of her New York City Opera debut in Handel's Alcina, the New Yorker called her "a Handelian of crisp accomplishment".

She was brought up in Charleston, S.C., and studied primarily at the New England Conservatory of Music, where she is now a professor of voice.

== Roles ==
Fortunato has gone on to create major roles in local premiere performances of Handel's operas in such venues as Merkin Hall, Carnegie Hall, New York's Town Hall, Emmanuel Music, and Monadnock Music, while singing major roles in eight premiere Handel recordings on CD for Albany, Newport Classic, and Vox. Other major roles have been created with companies such as Glimmerglass (Beatrice in Berlioz' Beatrice and Benedict)ʌ, Kentucky Opera (artist-in-residence, Maddalena in Rigoletto, and Dido in Dido and Aeneas), Connecticut Grand Opera (Rosina in Il Barbiere di Siviglia), Opera San Jose (Sarah in Mollicone's Hotel Eden), Rochester Opera (Siébel in Faust and Dorabella in Così fan tutte), Florida Grand Opera (Dorabella), and the Boston Lyric Opera on many occasions, the most recent being Marcellina in Le Nozze di Figaro.

== Solo performances ==
Ms. Fortunato has been a return soloist to the top ten American orchestras. Highlights of her lengthy orchestral engagement resume include Ravel's L'Enfant et les Sortilèges and Verdi's Falstaff with Seiji Ozawa and the Boston Symphony Orchestra; Handel's Messiah with the National Symphony Orchestra; Mozart's Requiem with Ottawa's National Arts Center Orchestra; Gluck's Orfeo with the Philadelphia Orchestra; Berlioz' Roméo et Juliette with the Minnesota Orchestra and the San Francisco Symphony; Ah! perfido with the Pittsburgh Symphony; Honegger's Jeanne d'Arc au Bûcher with the New York Philharmonic and Kurt Masur; Berio's Folk Songs with both the New Jersey Symphony and the Omaha Symphony; and Messiah with the New Japan Philharmonic and Osaka's Telemann Orchestra. Ms. Fortunato has also been associated with Roger Norrington and his series of Beethoven's 9th Symphony performed world-wide.

Much of D'Anna Fortunato's musical life has been devoted to the works of J.S. Bach. To this end, she has sung on numerous occasions with the Bethlehem, Winter Park, Carmel, Boulder, and Rome Bach Festivals; at the 92nd Street Y with John Gibbons; as a long-time soloist with Emmanuel Music (13 seasons); the Cantata Singers (10 seasons); and as a core member of the Bach Aria Group, touring, recording, and teaching summer seminars at S.U.N.Y. Stony Brook (15 years).

== Festival appearances ==
Fortunato's list of festival appearances is lengthy, and includes Marlboro, Tanglewood, Casals, Blossom, Rockport, Newport, Vaison-la-Romaine Festival, and Berlin's Spectrum Festival. She has been a frequent visitor with such chamber organizations as the Chamber Music Society of Lincoln Center, the Boston Chamber Music Society (which awarded her a Citation of Merit), the Northeast Harbor Chamber Festival (Composer's String Quartet), The Bach Aria Festival and Institute at Stony Brook, and the Marblehead Chamber Music Festival where she sang with the Cambridge Chamber Players as a core member.

== Discography ==
Recently released recordings on CD include Schönberg's Gurrelieder (historical live recording on GM Records) with Gunther Schuller and the NEC Orchestra, the complete Songs and Arias of Marilyn Ziffrin, and Handel's Deidamia (role of Achille) for Albany (one of 8 Handel premieres on CD), plus a New York Philharmonic CD of Honegger’s Jeanne d'Arc au Bûcher (Heavenly Voice). Heading her list of 40 CD releases is a re-release on Sony of her Victorian Baseball: Hurrah for Our National Game, while her CD of Amy Beach Songs on Northeastern won Best of the Year from New York Magazine, the Boston Globe, and the New York Post. Her Dido and Aeneas, on Harmonia Mundi with the Boston Camerata, was hailed as the first choice by Graham Sheffield in Opera on Record. Other labels for which she has recorded include London/Decca, Koch, Bridge, Gasparo, Erato, and Margun.

== Other ventures ==
D'Anna Fortunato has researched and performed extensively the little-known works of Amy Beach, Clara Schumann, Fanny Mendelssohn, Franz Liszt, and Charles Martin Loeffler. Composers John Harbison, Stephen Jaffee, Stephen Albert, and John Heiss, among others, have chosen her to debut their compositions. Other academic involvements include many seasons of chamber music tours to colleges around the U.S.; lecture-recitals, especially on the subject of women composers; and teaching assignments at the well-known summer vocal program, Songfest.
