= Marisa Galvany =

Operatic soprano

Marisa Galvany (née Myra Beth Genis; June 19, 1936) is an American soprano who had an active international career performing in operas and concerts up into the early 2000s. Known for the great intensity of her performances, Galvany particularly excelled in portraying Verdi heroines. She was notably a regular performer at the New York City Opera between 1972 and 1983.

== Biography ==
Galvany was born in Paterson, New Jersey to Samuel J. Genis, a cattle dealer born in Lithuania, and Tillie Friedman, the daughter of Polish Jewish immigrants.

She studied primarily under Armen Boyajian (also the teacher of Paul Plishka, Samuel Ramey, and Harry Theyard). She made her professional opera debut at the Seattle Opera in 1968 in the title role of Giacomo Puccini's Tosca. The following year, she portrayed the title heroine in Simon Mayr's Medea in Corinto in New York City, a performance which was recorded for Vanguard. She made her first international appearance in 1972 at the Palacio de Bellas Artes in Mexico City in the title role of Giuseppe Verdi's Aida.

In 1972, Galvany was offered a contract to join the roster of principal singers at New York City Opera by Julius Rudel. She accepted, making her debut with the company later that year as Elisabetta in Gaetano Donizetti's Maria Stuarda opposite Beverly Sills in the title role. She continued to sing regularly with that company through 1983, portraying such roles as Abigaille in Nabucco, Amelia in Un ballo in maschera, Gilda in Rigoletto, Odabella in Attila, Santuzza in Cavalleria rusticana, Violetta in La traviata, and the title roles in Anna Bolena and Luigi Cherubini's Médée. She also sang in several different productions of Tosca where she partnered such tenors as José Carreras and Theyard.

In 1973, Galvany filmed her acclaimed Lady Macbeth, in Macbeth, for the Canadian Broadcasting Company, opposite Louis Quilico. That same year she made her first appearance with the Philadelphia Lyric Opera Company as Aida with Pier Miranda Ferraro as Radamès, Joann Grillo as Amneris, and Gianfranco Rivoli conducting. In 1974 she made her first appearance at the New Orleans Opera opening the 1974–1975 season as Rachel in Fromental Halévy's La Juive with Richard Tucker as Eléazar. She returned to open the company's next two consecutive seasons as Aida and Valentine in Les Huguenots, the latter production with Rita Shane and Susanne Marsee. She later returned to New Orleans to sing Salomé in Jules Massenet's Hérodiade.

Galvany made her debut at the Metropolitan Opera in 1979, in the title role of Norma. In 1985, the singing-actress sang Gertrud in Hänsel und Gretel and Ortrud in Lohengrin on tour with the company, then the Kostelnička in Jenůfa during the Fall Season in the theatre. At the Cincinnati Opera, she appeared in Turandot (with Theyard) and Salome (with Ticho Parly as Herod).

During the mid-1980s, Galvany began to add mezzo-soprano roles to her repertoire. She sang Amneris in Aida at the Cincinnati Opera in 1985. In 1992 she sang the title role in Bizet's Carmen with the New York Grand Opera. (NYGO) She performed frequently with the NYGO up into the early 2000s.

On the international stage Galvany has appeared at the Opern- und Schauspielhaus Frankfurt, the Liceu, the Great Theatre, Warsaw, the National Theatre in Prague, and the National Theatre in Belgrade among others. She has also sung in operas in Brazil and Venezuela.

Galvany married George Kornbluth, an accountant, and is mother of Sally Kornbluth, a scientist and the 18th president of the Massachusetts Institute of Technology.
