= Phyllis Treigle =

American soprano

Phyllis Treigle (born May 6, 1960) is a native of New Orleans, Louisiana, and is a noted American soprano, and the daughter of the bass-baritone Norman Treigle. She graduated from Loyola University of the South's College of Music and made her professional debut with the New Orleans Opera Association as Flora Bervoix, in La traviata, in 1980.

Treigle subsequently appeared with the New York City Opera (as Miss Jessel in The Turn of the Screw, conducted by Christopher Keene), Dublin Grand Opera Society, Houston Grand Opera (Bekhetaten in the American premiere of Akhnaten), New Orleans Opera (Der fliegende Holländer), Pittsburgh Opera (in Tito Capobianco's production of Mefistofele, originally mounted for her father), Sarasota Opera Association, The New Opera Theatre, Skylight Opera Theatre (Donna Elvira in Don Giovanni, directed by Francesca Zambello), Wolf Trap Opera Company (Transformations and Postcard from Morocco), Eugene Opera, New York Opera Repertory Theatre, Pennsylvania Opera Theater, and Jefferson Performing Arts Society (Susannah, opposite Michael Devlin). She also sang the first New Orleans performances of Savitri and La voix humaine.

At Sarasota, she appeared in The Turn of the Screw, Rosalinde von Eisenstein in Die Fledermaus, Mina in Aroldo, Amelia in Un ballo in maschera, and Amelia Grimaldi in both versions of Simon Boccanegra.

In 1997, Treigle portrayed the title role in the original version of Cherubini's Médée for Opera Quotannis at Alice Tully Hall, Lincoln Center in New York City. As of 2016, Treigle is Chair of Vocal Music at the New Orleans Center for Creative Arts (NOCCA), from where she retired in 2026. After an hiatus of some ten years, she returned to the stage in the cameo role of Annina in La traviata, for the New Orleans Opera, in April 2009. She portrayed Marthe Schwertlein in Faust for the same company in 2017 with Paul Groves in the name part, and she opened their 2017/2018 season as Lucia in Cavalleria rusticana. In 2026, she undertook the role of Madame de Croissy in the company premiere of Dialogues des Carmélites.

In 2019, Treigle performed the part of the Reciter in Pierrot lunaire, at the Marigny Opera House.

== Discography ==
- Cherubini: Médée (St Julien, Fortunato; Folse, 1997) Newport Classic

== Sources ==
- Brian Morgan: Strange Child of Chaos: Norman Treigle, iUniverse, 2006. ISBN 0-595-38898-1
- Fisher, Florence, Sarasota Opera Shines In Strauss' Classic, Sarasota Herald-Tribune, February 15, 1989
- The Advocate (Baton Rouge, La.), Opera singer follows in father's footsteps, December 10, 1986
- Waleson, Heidi, American Opera Singers Can Look Homeward, The New York Times, October 30, 1988
