= Knud Andersson =

German-born American conductor (1910-1996)

Knud D. Andersson (1910 – 1 December 1996 in New Orleans) was a German-born American conductor. He enjoyed a long association with the New Orleans Opera where he served as first assistant conductor and choral director from 1953 to 1965 and then music director and resident conductor from 1965 until his retirement in 1983. The city of New Orleans, honored him with certificates of merit in 1957 and 1967.

== Life and career ==
Born in Bochum, Germany, Andersson received his initial musical training as a child in the piano and the organ from his father. He earned diplomas in piano and conducting from the Hochschule für Musik und Tanz Köln and a doctorate in musicology from University of Cologne. He also studied music at the University of California, Los Angeles. While a conducting student in Cologne, he worked as conductor of the Bonn Chamber Orchestra and the Cologne University chorus and orchestra. After graduating, he worked as a conductor at the Bielefeld Opera, the Cologne Opera, and Theater Bonn. In 1970 he was awarded the Cross of the Order of Merit by the West German government.

In 1951 Andersson immigrated to the United States to assume a post on the music faculty at Morningside College in Sioux City, Iowa. In addition to teaching, he worked regularly as an accompanist to singers like Herva Nelli and Irra Petina. From 1953-1983 his work was primarily with the New Orleans Opera (NOO). During his thirty-year association with the NOO, he conducted over 160 performances of more than fifty operas, including Die Fledermaus (directed by Armando Agnini, 1955), Les contes d'Hoffmann, Il tabarro, Susannah (with Phyllis Curtin, Norman Treigle, and Richard Cassilly), Le nozze di Figaro (with Italo Tajo), Lucia di Lammermoor (with the young Plácido Domingo as Arturo), Faust (with Treigle), Tosca (with Dorothy Kirsten and Cesare Bardelli), La traviata (with Audrey Schuh), Gianni Schicchi, Hoffmann again (with Beverly Sills and Treigle), Otello (with James McCracken, Raina Kabaivanska, and Cornell MacNeil), La sonnambula (with Gianna D'Angelo, Nicola Monti, and Nicola Moscona), Il trovatore (with Leyla Gencer, directed by Tito Capobianco), Madama Butterfly, Samson et Dalila, Rigoletto (with Roberta Peters), Tannhäuser (with Ticho Parly), Markheim (world premiere, with Treigle and Schuh, directed by the composer, Carlisle Floyd), Turandot (with Birgit Nilsson), Il barbiere di Siviglia, Lucia again (now with Domingo as Edgardo), Elektra (with Inge Borkh and Regina Resnik), Les pêcheurs de perles, Aida, Manon (with Montserrat Caballé), Der fliegende Holländer, Pagliacci, Carmen, Cavalleria rusticana, Fidelio, Manon Lescaut, Norma, Attila (with Justino Díaz), Arabella (with Claire Watson), The Medium (with Resnik), Salome, Lucia (now with Sills), Aida (now with Jon Vickers), Thaïs (with Carol Neblett), La Juive (with Richard Tucker), Ariadne auf Naxos, La bohème (with Katia Ricciarelli), Lohengrin (with William Cochran), Hérodiade, Les Huguenots (with Marisa Galvany, Rita Shane, and Susanne Marsee), Macbeth (with Sherrill Milnes), Der Rosenkavalier (with Evelyn Lear), La favorite, Andrea Chénier (with Harry Theyard), Die Walküre (with Rita Hunter and Johanna Meier), La traviata again (with Karan Armstrong), Ernani (with Renato Francesconi) and Don Pasquale. His final conducting assignment with the company was Salome (with Roberta Knie), in 1980.

In the fall of 1966, Andersson led the sextet from Lucia di Lammermoor on The Bell Telephone Hour's "Sights and Sounds of New Orleans". The soloists were d'Angelo, Domingo, Enzo Sordello, Thomas Paul, Bennie Ray, and Linda Neumann, and it was directed by Arthur Cosenza.

In addition to his work with the NOO, Andersson also worked as a guest conductor in the United States, Spain, and Germany. He also worked as a vocal coach. His pupils included Ruth Falcon and Anthony Laciura.

He was married to Liselotte Andersson (who died in 2014); they had two sons and a daughter. Andersson died in New Orleans, and he and his wife are buried in Metairie Cemetery.

== Discography ==
- Floyd: Susannah (Curtin, Cassilly, Treigle; 1962) VAI
- Offenbach: Les contes d'Hoffmann (Sills, Turp, Treigle; 1964) VAI
- Floyd: Markheim (Schuh, Crofoot, Treigle; 1966) VAI
- Strauss: Elektra (Borkh, Schuh, Resnik, Crofoot, Rayson; 1966) VAI
- Massenet: Manon (Caballé, J.Alexander, L.Quilico; 1967) VAI
- Verdi: Il trovatore (Caballé, Pospiš-Baldani, Domingo, Sordello; 1968) VAI
