= Arthur Cosenza =

American impresario and stage director (1924-2005)

Arthur Cosenza (October 16, 1924 – December 27, 2005) was an American impresario, stage director, and baritone of Italian heritage, who was particularly associated with the New Orleans Opera Association.

== Early life and education ==
Cosenza was born in Philadelphia, on October 16, 1924, and studied at the Ornstein School of Music from 1946 to 1948, the Berkshire Music Festival in 1947, and the American Theatre Wing from 1948 to 1950. In 1948, his friend Mario Lanza introduced him to Armando Agnini, principal stage director of the Opera in New Orleans. Cosenza also met the New Orleans-born mezzo-soprano, Marietta Muhs, while she was studying at Juilliard School. They married in 1950, and moved to New Orleans.

== Career ==
As a baritone, Cosenza made his debut in New Orleans, in 1954, in a small role in Madama Butterfly, with Victoria de los Ángeles, conducted by Walter Herbert. He went on to sing twenty-five secondary roles with the Association, most notably as Schaunard in La bohème, in 1959, opposite Licia Albanese (his favorite soprano), Giuseppe di Stefano, Audrey Schuh, Giuseppe Valdengo, and Norman Treigle, conducted by Renato Cellini, and directed by Agnini. (The performance was released on Compact Discs by VAI, in 1995.)

In 1960, he directed his first of his many "traditional" productions for the company, Rigoletto. He also staged Il trittico, Andrea Chénier, Il barbiere di Siviglia, Carmen (with Gloria Lane, Richard Cassilly, and Treigle), Lucia di Lammermoor, La traviata (with Schuh), La bohème, Cavalleria rusticana (with Zinka Milanov), Aïda, Madama Butterfly, Don Pasquale (with Salvatore Baccaloni), Samson et Dalila (with James McCracken, Sandra Warfield, Louis Quilico, and Nicola Moscona), Rigoletto (with Roberta Peters), La traviata (with Virginia Zeani), Il segreto di Susanna, Tosca (with Gabriella Tucci, Plácido Domingo, and Cesare Bardelli), Les pêcheurs de perles, Manon (with Montserrat Caballé), Faust (with Albert Lance and Dorothy Kirsten), Macbeth (with Cornell MacNeil), Lucia di Lammermoor again (with Dame Joan Sutherland), Il trovatore, Pagliacci, Cavalleria rusticana, Manon Lescaut, Attila (with Justino Díaz), Un ballo in maschera, The Medium (with Regina Resnik), Madama Butterfly again (with Raina Kabaivanska), Lucia di Lammermoor again (with Beverly Sills), Aïda again (with Jon Vickers as Radamès), Roméo et Juliette, Rigoletto again (with Sherrill Milnes), and Andrea Chénier again (with Harry Theyard), for the company. His final major staging was of Don Pasquale, in 1977.

In 1965, Cosenza became the New Orleans Opera's resident stage director, and, in 1970, was appointed general and artistic director, a position he held until 1998. Afterwards, he was director emeritus until his death.

Cosenza also produced opera in Hartford, Houston, Pittsburgh, and at the Philadelphia Lyric and the Jackson Opera Guild. He founded the Opera Workshop at Loyola University of the South in 1954, where he taught until 1984. He was appointed Knight of the Order of the Star of Italian Sodality and Officer of the Ordre des Arts et des Lettres.

In 1966, his staging of the Sextet from Lucia di Lammermoor was seen on The Bell Telephone Hour's "Sights and Sounds of New Orleans," with Gianna D'Angelo, Domingo, Enzo Sordello, Thomas Paul, Bennie Ray, and Linda Neumann, conducted by Knud Andersson.

== Death ==
Cosenza, who was widowed since 1996, died at the age 81, and was survived by two sons and a daughter. He is buried in Metairie Cemetery.
