= Alan Crofoot =

Canadian opera singer

- Born: June 2, 1929; Toronto, Ontario, Canada
- Died: March 5, 1979 (aged 49); Dayton, Ohio, U.S.
- Education: University of Toronto
- Occupations: Opera singer, actor
- Years active: 1956–1979
- Spouse: Dodi Protero (m.?–1972)

Alan Crofoot (June 2, 1929 – March 5, 1979) was a Canadian operatic Heldentenor, character tenor specialist, and actor. He was also the host of Mr. Piper, a 1960s children's television series that aired on the CBC in Canada.

== Career ==
Crofoot was born in Toronto, Ontario, Canada. He attended the University of Toronto where he earned a Master's degree in psychology. His operatic career began at the Canadian Opera, as Spoletta in Tosca, in 1956. Crofoot also appeared in stage productions of musicals such as Man of La Mancha, in London's West End, and Oliver! on Broadway and Winnipeg's Rainbow Stage.

From 1963 to 1964, Crofoot hosted the CBC children's program “Mr. Piper,” which also became well-known in the United Kingdom and the United States. Crofoot hosted the show dressed as a Pied Piper, with a flower in his hat. He narrated cartoon fairy tales, which also screened as standalone cartoons. The full episodes also featured live action segments involving magic tricks, animals and travelogues.

He created the role of Josiah Creach in the world premiere of Carlisle Floyd's Markheim, with Norman Treigle and Audrey Schuh, in New Orleans (1966), as well as appearances at the New York City Opera (Herod in Salome, opposite Maralin Niska, in 1975) and the Metropolitan Opera (The Bartered Bride, directed by John Dexter, in 1978). Also in his repertoire was the Jailer/Inquisitor in Il prigioniero.

In 1970, Mr. Crofoot appeared in the world premiere of My Heart’s in the Highlands, a chamber opera in two acts by the American composer Jack Beeson. The opera was first broadcast on National Educational Television, predecessor of today’s Public Broadcasting Service, on March 17, 1970. The production was recorded at Boston’s WGBH-TV in November 1969. It was directed by the Emmy Award-winning TV director Kirk Browning. The opera’s chamber orchestra was conducted by Peter Herman Adler. Among the other cast members were bass-baritone Spiro Malas and contralto Lili Chookasian.

In 1974, Mr. Crofoot appeared in the world premiere of Hans Werner Henze's Rachel, la cubana, also for NET Opera Theater, opposite Lee Venora, Susanne Marsee and Alan Titus, conducted by the composer. In 1976, he was in the American premiere of Sessions' Montezuma, as Jeronimo Aguilar, conducted by Sarah Caldwell, in Boston.

== Personal life ==
Crofoot was previously married to fellow opera singer Dodi Protero. They divorced around 1972. At the time of his death, Crofoot was engaged to Jean Godden.

== Death ==
In the early morning hours of March 5, 1979, Crofoot jumped from his fifth floor hotel room window in Dayton, Ohio. He died of his injuries at Miami Valley Hospital shortly thereafter. At the time of his death, Crofoot was set to direct the production of Salome by the Dayton Opera Company.

Crofoot's manager, James Sardos, later said that Crofoot was generally happy but had been experiencing "fits of depression" caused by blood pressure medication he had been taking. On the night before his death, Crofoot had been drinking beer which Sardos believed reacted adversely with medication leading to Crofoot's death.

== Discography ==
- Offenbach: Orphée aux enfers (Faris, 1960) EMI
- Floyd: Markheim (Schuh, Treigle; Andersson, 1966) VAI [live]
- Strauss: Elektra (Borkh, Schuh, Resnik, Rayson; Andersson, 1966) VAI [live]

== Videography ==
- Smetana: The Bartered Bride (Stratas, Gedda, Vickers, Talvela; Levine, Dexter, 1978) [live]
