= Armando Agnini =

Italian stage director of opera (1884–1960)

Armando Agnini (July 11, 1884 – March 27, 1960) was a successful Italian stage director of opera.

== Metropolitan Opera ==
Born in Naples, Italy, he went to the United States as a steerage passenger on the S/S Auguste Victoria from Naples to New York in 1902, at the age of eighteen. He was associated with companies in Boston and Montreal, and made his debut with the Metropolitan Opera with a production of I puritani (with Maria Barrientos), in 1919. His work was seen at the Met until 1934, with Il barbiere di Siviglia (with Titta Ruffo as Figaro, and, later, Elvira de Hidalgo as Rosina), Lucia di Lammermoor (with Amelita Galli-Curci and Beniamino Gigli, later Toti dal Monte), Tosca, Aïda (with Rosa Ponselle, later Elisabeth Rethberg), Madama Butterfly (with Geraldine Farrar and Giovanni Martinelli), Rigoletto, Cavalleria rusticana, La bohème, Manon Lescaut (with Aureliano Pertile as des Grieux), Pagliacci, Zazà, La navarraise, L'oracolo (with Antonio Scotti), Il trovatore, La forza del destino, L'amore dei tre re, Manon, Samson et Dalila, Boris Godunov (with Feodor Chaliapin in the name part, and Ezio Pinza as Pimenn), Faust, Pizzetti's Fra Gherardo (United States premiere, conducted by Tullio Serafin, 1929), La traviata (with Ponselle, later Claudia Muzio and Tito Schipa), Les contes d'Hoffmann, Il signor Bruschino (U.S. premiere, 1932), Lakmé (with Lily Pons), L'africaine, The Emperor Jones (with Lawrence Tibbett), Simon Boccanegra, Gianni Schicchi, and Roméo et Juliette.

Agnini was also on the staff of the San Francisco Opera, and guest-directed in Mexico City, Buenos Aires, Rio de Janeiro, London, Paris, Pittsburgh, Philadelphia, and Chicago.

== Hollywood ==
Maestro Agnini was "Technical Advisor" for the film Metropolitan (with Tibbett, 1935). Uncredited, he held the same position for Going My Way (with Bing Crosby and Risë Stevens, 1944) and The Lost Weekend (with Ray Milland and Jane Wyman, directed by Billy Wilder, 1945).

== New Orleans Opera ==
In 1947, Agnini debuted at the New Orleans Opera Association, with Il trovatore (with Stella Roman and Enzo Mascherini, conducted by Walter Herbert), and went on to stage Carmen, Faust (with Pinza), Madama Butterfly (with Mario Lanza in a rare operatic appearance, 1948), and Samson et Dalila. By 1954, he had joined the Association's staff, and directed La bohème (conducted by Renato Cellini), Otello (with Ramón Vinay and Herva Nelli), Tosca (with Inge Borkh and Robert Weede), Lakmé, Rigoletto, Andrea Chénier, Martha, Die Fledermaus, Madama Butterfly, Carmen (with Norman Treigle in his first Escamillo), Gianni Schicchi, Aïda (with Nelli), Manon, Lucia di Lammermoor, Elektra, L'amore dei tre re, La traviata (with Lucia Evangelista), Le nozze di Figaro (with Virginia MacWatters as Susanna), Falstaff (with Leonard Warren), Cavalleria rusticana, Pagliacci, Werther, Faust, La Cenerentola, Boris Godunov (with Boris Christoff), Il barbiere di Siviglia, Manon Lescaut (with Eleanor Steber), Il trovatore (with Nelli and Warren), Don Pasquale, Turandot, L'elisir d'amore, Hänsel und Gretel, Norma, Don Giovanni, Les contes d'Hoffmann, and Tannhäuser.

Act IV (or an excerpt thereof) of Agnini's 1959 production of La bohème (with Licia Albanese, Giuseppe di Stefano, Audrey Schuh, Giuseppe Valdengo, and Treigle) was televised in New Orleans, but a kinescope has never been discovered. He died on March 27, 1960, of a heart condition, during rehearsals for his production of Samson et Dalila (with Stevens and Vinay), in New Orleans, leaving behind his widow (Madeleine Leweck Agnini) and two daughters (Luisa Agnini and Cristina Agnini).
