= Herva Nelli =

Italian and American soprano (1909–1994)

- Herva Nelli in Cavalleria rusticana (photo by James Abresch, with dedication).
- Born: January 9, 1909; Florence, Italy
- Died: May 31, 1994 (aged 85); Sharon, Connecticut, U.S.
- Occupation: Operatic soprano.

Herva Nelli, in the NBC telecast of Aïda, 1949.

Herva Nelli (January 9, 1909 – May 31, 1994) was an Italian and American operatic soprano.

== Biography ==
The daughter of Ferrucio Nelli and the former Maria Malloggi, she was named after the French socialist Gustave Hervé, and was born in Florence, where she attended a convent school. At the age of ten, however, she and her family left Italy for the United States, arriving at Ellis Island on September 17, 1919, and settling in Pittsburgh, where she later studied at the Pittsburgh Music Institute. She married Sam Marino in 1928; the marriage ended in divorce in 1964. The soprano became a naturalized citizen of the USA on January 27, 1944, at the age of thirty-five. Her principal voice-teacher was Nicola Palumbo.

In 1937, the soprano made her operatic debut with Brooklyn's Salmaggi Opera, as Santuzza in Mascagni's Cavalleria rusticana. In ensuing seasons, she gained experience with that ensemble, presenting roles that would form the core of her repertoire, including Leonora in Verdi's La forza del destino (with Sydney Rayner as Don Alvaro, 1943) and another Leonora in Verdi's Il trovatore. She also sang the title roles of Bellini's Norma, Verdi's Aida (with Bernardo de Muro at the end of his career, 1944), and Ponchielli's La Gioconda. In 1947, she made her New York City Opera debut, as Santuzza, conducted by Julius Rudel.

Also in 1947, Nelli successfully auditioned for the conductor Arturo Toscanini (following the recommendation of Licia Albanese), and sang the part of Desdemona in the NBC Symphony Orchestra's concert version of Verdi's Otello, opposite Ramón Vinay. This led to the famous series of broadcasts of other Verdi works, which were later issued on records by RCA Victor: Aida (1949, which was televised as well), Alice Ford in Falstaff (with Giuseppe Valdengo, 1950), the Requiem (with Fedora Barbieri, Giuseppe Di Stefano, and Cesare Siepi, 1951), and Amelia in Un ballo in maschera (with Jan Peerce and Robert Merrill, 1954), which was Toscanini's final operatic performance. When Toscanini died early in 1957, he left his protégée his baton in his will.

In 1948, Nelli sang in Genoa (La Gioconda, conducted by Tullio Serafin) and at the Teatro alla Scala. At the latter theatre, she participated in the "Serata Commemorativa di Arrigo Boito" (excerpts from Mefistofele and Nerone, conducted by Toscanini) and starred in performances of Aida (with Mirto Picchi and Elena Nicolai, conducted by Antonino Votto).

From 1949 Nelli performed with the New Orleans Opera Association: Aida (with Norman Treigle as the King of Egypt), Otello (1954), Aida again (1955), and Il trovatore (with Leonard Warren, directed by Armando Agnini, 1958). She was also often heard in Philadelphia (from 1946 to 1959), in Aïda, La Gioconda (with Ebe Stignani), Cavalleria rusticana, Norma, Il trovatore (with Enzo Mascherini), Otello, La forza del destino, Puccini's Tosca (conducted by Eugene Ormandy), Un ballo in maschera, and Verdi's Nabucco. In 1951, Nelli reappeared with the New York City Opera, in Cavalleria rusticana again, as well as Aida; the next year, she portrayed Maddalena de Coigny in Giordano's Andrea Chénier (in Theodore Komisarjevsky's production). With the San Francisco Opera, in 1951 and 1952, the soprano sang in Otello, La forza del destino (with Robert Weede), Aida (with Mario Del Monaco), Cavalleria rusticana, Il trovatore, and La bohème (this last on tour to Los Angeles); in 1957, she returned for Un ballo in maschera (conducted by William Steinberg). With the Baltimore Civic Opera in 1952, she debuted in Aida; in the 1954-55 season, she sang there in Il trovatore.

Nelli made her debut at the Metropolitan Opera in 1953, where she appeared until 1961. She was seen in Aida (conducted by Renato Cellini), La forza del destino, Il trovatore, Cavalleria rusticana, Andrea Chénier, Un ballo in maschera (with Marian Anderson, conducted by Dimitri Mitropoulos) and Mozart's Don Giovanni (as Donna Anna, her only Mozart role). With the Met, she toured to Boston, Philadelphia, Cleveland, Atlanta, Dallas, Toronto and Minneapolis.

The soprano appeared in Cuba (Tosca, 1950) and in Mexico City at the Palacio de Bellas Artes, in 1953, starring in Il trovatore and Norma.

Herva Nelli was also heard at the Cincinnati Opera many times between 1953 and 1956: Aida, La traviata (as Violetta Valéry, opposite John Alexander, and conducted by Anton Coppola), Andrea Chénier, Un ballo in maschera and Puccini's Madama Butterfly (as Cio-Cio-San, conducted by Nicola Rescigno). The soprano was also seen with the Pittsburgh Opera (Un ballo in maschera, 1955), San Francisco's Cosmopolitan Opera (Il trovatore, 1956), Lyric Opera of Chicago (Il trovatore, with Jussi Björling and Ettore Bastianini, 1956), Tulsa Opera (Aida, 1956) and Opera Guild of Miami (Un ballo in maschera, with Richard Tucker, 1959). Upon her 1951 return to the City Opera, Howard Taubman wrote of her in The New York Times: "Mme Nelli's voice is of grand size and range, and when she has it under control it has quality and character. Her pianissimo singing can be lovely, indeed. But she has a tendency to force and drive her tone until it loses its natural beauty."

On September 22, 1956, La Nelli created the role of Bethsheba in the American premiere of Darius Milhaud's David, co-starring Harve Presnell, Mack Harrell, and Giorgio Tozzi, conducted by Izler Solomon, and staged by Harry Horner. It was performed at the Hollywood Bowl, as presented by the Festival of Faith and Freedom Committee of the American Association for Jewish Education.

At the Teatro Colón, in 1958, she was the soprano soloist for Beethoven's Ninth Symphony, conducted by Juan José Castro. In 1960, the soprano sang Aida with the New York Opera Festival touring to Washington, DC.

Among the orchestras with which she sang the Verdi Requiem were the New York Philharmonic (conducted by Guido Cantelli, 1955) and the New Orleans Philharmonic-Symphony Orchestra (1955). The prima donna toured to Colombia, Puerto Rico, and Madeira.

Nelli gave her farewell in April 1962, with the Brooklyn Opera Company, at the Academy of Music, in Norma, conducted by Carlo Moresco. In retirement, she acquired a particular reputation as a chef. In 1985, she appeared in an interview in the documentary Toscanini: The Maestro, which was telecast over PBS in 1988.

On May 31, 1994, the soprano died of heart failure, with subdural hematoma and dementia contributing to her death, at the age of eighty-five, at the Sharon Country Manor, in Connecticut. She was buried in the South Dover Rural Cemetery, in Wingdale, New York.

In 2005, reviewing the DVD release of the Concert Version of Aida, Ira Siff, in Opera News, noted that "there is a sense of occasion here, as the eighty-two-year-old Toscanini … unleashes a performance of immense power. Herva Nelli may not possess a voice of distinctive beauty, but she is committed to the drama and lives every moment through the music. Both of Aida's big arias are handled with care and conviction, the 'O patria mia' particularly nuanced and convincing. Yes, one could wish for a longer, more dolce high C, but her reading of the aria is mesmerizing…."

== Bibliography ==
- Opera Stars in the Sun, by Mary Jane Matz, Farrar, Straus & Cudahy, 1955.
- "Soloist with Toscanini," from an interview with Herva Nelli, secured by Gunnar Asklund, Etude, April 1955.
- The Metropolitan Opera Encyclopedia, edited by David Hamilton, Simon & Schuster, 1987. ISBN 0-671-61732-X
- Uttering Lamentations, by Brian Morgan, 2023.
