= William Diard =

American opera singer

William Diard (April 26, 1924 – March 8, 2009) was an American operatic tenor, teacher, musician, and actor.

== Birth ==
William Diard was born in Floral Park, New York on April 26, 1924.

== Career ==
He earned degrees in vocal performance from the Hartt School of Music, The Juilliard School, and the Naples Conservatory. He made his debut at the New York City Opera in 1961, as Nanki-Poo in The Mikado. His concert debut took place at New York's Town Hall, also in 1961. Diard's career began as a youngster. His great-aunt, the French prima donna, Fatmah Diard, a protegee of Jules Massenet, acquainted him with serious music and the French language. At the age of eight he sang with the Paulist Choir in New York, later becoming tenor soloist with "Chanticleer," touring Europe and the Far East. He recorded for RCA Victor. In 1966, he appeared in the world premiere of Carlisle Floyd's Markheim at the New Orleans Opera (opposite Norman Treigle and Audrey Schuh), later retiring to Hadlyme, CT, where the Diards made appearances and taught in their private studio. The following year he joined the voice faculty at the Hartt School where he taught until his retirement in 1988.

== Marriage ==
Diard met his wife, Gloria Aliani, while singing a performance of La bohème in 1956 in Miami, Florida. Aliani was making her debut as Mimì to Diard's Rodolfo. They married later that year and began concertizing together. In 1960, they were signed with National Artists Corporation. Engagements with symphony orchestras followed. At Hartt, Diard studied with Virginia and Frederich Schorr (renowned bass-baritone of the Metropolitan Opera).

== Death ==
He died in Lyme, Connecticut at the age of 84.
