= Margaret Lloyd (soprano) =

American soprano (born 1973)

Margaret Lloyd (born 1973) is an American soprano who is particularly known for her performances in contemporary operas and concert works. She has sung in the world premieres of several operas, most notably portraying the role of Lightfoot McClendon in the premiere of Carlisle Floyd's Cold Sassy Tree at the Houston Grand Opera in 2000. She has also sung in the world premieres of several works by composer Michael Torke.

== Biography ==
Lloyd was born and raised in Ames, Iowa. She graduated from Ames High School in 1991 and then entered Northwestern University where she earned a bachelor's degree in vocal performance in 1995. In 1996 she joined the Young American Artists Program at Glimmerglass Opera, making her professional opera debut with the company that year as Margret Borden in Jack Beeson's Lizzie Borden. The following year she played Curley's Wife in Glimmerglass's production of Carlisle Floyd's Of Mice and Men.

In 1999 Lloyd returned to Glimmerglass Opera again to appear in the world premieres of three one-act operas that were presented together under the title Central Park. For this production she portrayed the role of Jessica in Deborah Drattell and Wendy Wasserstein's The Festival of Regrets, the role of The Daughter in Michael Torke and A.R. Gurney's Strawberry Fields, and the Woman with sun reflector in Robert Beaser and Terrence McNally's The Food of Love. The works were also presented with the same casts at the New York City Opera that year. She also sang as a soloist in the world premieres of Aaron Jay Kernis's Garden of Light and Michael Torke's Four Seasons with the New York Philharmonic, the New York Choral Artists, and the American Boychoir under conductor Kurt Masur at Avery Fisher Hall. In addition, Lloyd sang the role of Gretel in Engelbert Humperdinck's Hänsel und Gretel with Chicago Opera Theater.

In 2000 Lloyd portrayed Cunegonde in Leonard Bernstein's Candide at Central City Opera. She also appeared at the Houston Grand Opera (HGO) as Lightfoot McClendon in the world premiere of Carlisle Floyd's Cold Sassy Tree, a role which she recorded and reprised at the Austin Lyric Opera (2001), Utah Opera (2003), Opera Carolina (2003), and Opera Omaha (2004). In 2001 she portrayed the roles of Pamina in The Magic Flute and Amy in Mark Adamo's Little Women at the HGO. The latter performance was recorded live for broadcast on PBS's Great Performances and subsequently released on CD and DVD. That same year she performed the role of Josephine in H.M.S. Pinafore with Santa Fe Opera and sang the world premiere of Michael Torke's Four Proverbs as Alice Tully Hall, later singing the premiere of the chamber orchestra version of that work with the American Composers Orchestra at Zankel Hall in 2005. In 2002 she portrayed the role of Sophie in Richard Strauss's Der Rosenkavalier with Opera Carolina and Cunegonde in Candide with Portland Opera.
