= Cold Sassy Tree (opera) =

Opera composed by Carlisle Floyd

- Opera by Carlisle Floyd
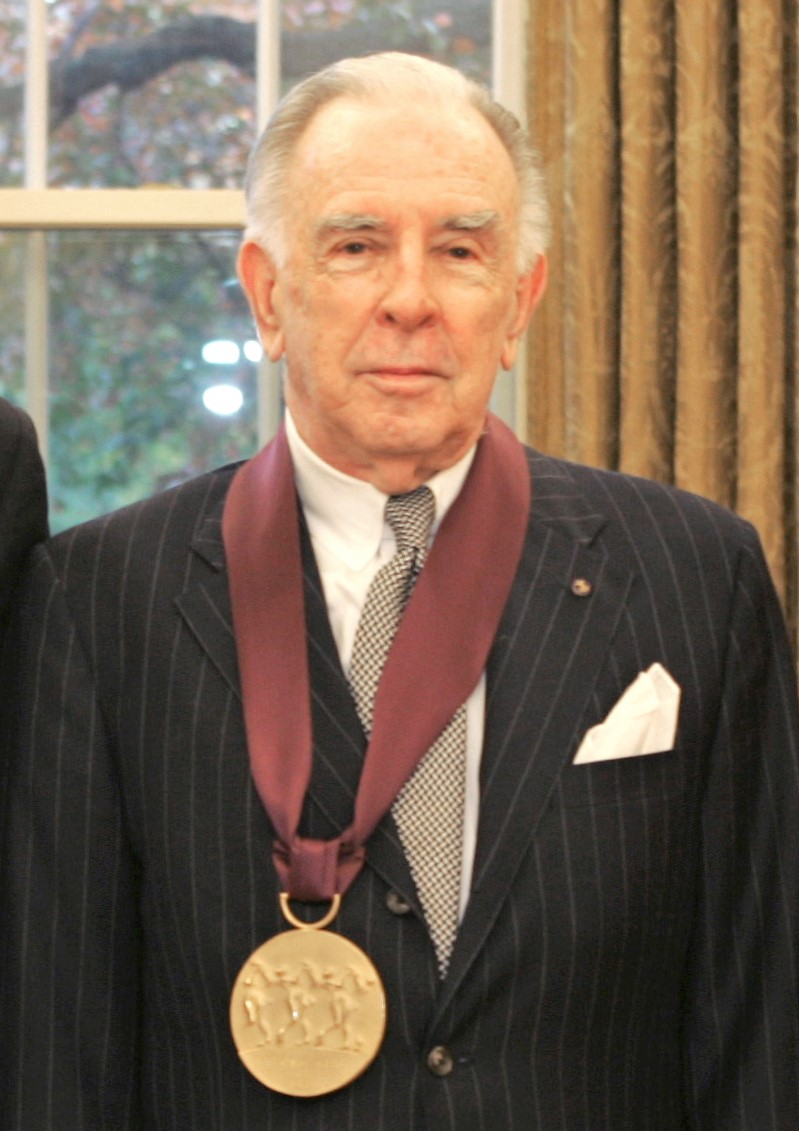
- Carlisle Floyd in 2004 with the National Medal of Arts
- Language: English
- Based on: Cold Sassy Tree by Olive Ann Burns
- Premiere: April 14, 2000; Houston Grand Opera

Cold Sassy Tree is an opera composed by Carlisle Floyd, based on the 1984 novel by Olive Ann Burns.

Cold Sassy Tree was Floyd's tenth opera. It had its world premiere on April 14, 2000, at the Houston Grand Opera, with a production staged by Australian filmmaker Bruce Beresford and conducted by Patrick Summers. The original cast included Dean Peterson, Patricia Racette, Diane Alexander, Beth Clayton, Margaret Lloyd and John McVeigh. The production was the Houston Grand Opera's 25th new opera, and was created in a co-commission between the company and opera companies in Austin, Baltimore, North Carolina and San Diego.

Floyd came to the project by way of a sibling. "The book was given to me by my sister, because she thought that somebody from this part of the world, the southeast, would probably fully appreciate it,” he said in an interview following the Houston premiere. “But, everywhere I have traveled in this country, people have read Cold Sassy Tree and the standard reaction from everybody, male and female, is 'I loved it.' Obviously, its appeal goes far beyond regional boundaries. What appealed to me most about it in terms of its operatic possibilities were the very vivid, rich characters. And it is also rich in comic incidents.”

Cold Sassy Tree has been staged by regional opera countries around the United States. A two-disk CD recording featuring the original Houston Grand Opera cast was released in 2005 by Albany Records. The Houston performance was videotaped for television, but it was never broadcast or released on DVD.

== Roles ==
Role	Voice type
Rucker Lattimore	Bass-baritone
Love Simpson	Soprano
Will Tweedy (Rucker's grandson)	Tenor
Lightfoot McClendon (15 years)	Soprano
Clayton McAllister (Texas Suitor, 30s)	Baritone
Loma Williams (in her 20s; Mary's sister)	Mezzo-soprano
Effie Belle Tate (Town busybody in her 60s)	Mezzo-soprano
Mary Willis (Widow in her 60s, Will's mother)	Soprano
Thelma Predmore (in her 50s)	Mezzo-soprano
Lula	Soprano
Myrtis	Mezzo-soprano
Campbell Williams (Loma's husband, in his 20s)	Tenor
Hosie Roach (Lightfoot's half-brother, late teens)	Baritone
Mayor	Tenor
Sheriff	Baritone
Dr. Lomax	Bass-baritone
Rufus	Tenor
Buford (foreman, carpenter, plumber)	Tenor/Baritone
Luther (Hosie's accomplice, early teens)	Tenor
