= Renato Cellini =

Italian conductor (1912–1967)

- Born: April 24, 1912; Turin, Italy
- Died: March 25, 1967 (aged 54); New Orleans, Louisiana, U.S.
- Occupation: Conductor
- Organizations: Metropolitan Opera; New Orleans Opera

Renato Cellini (Italian pronunciation: [reˈnaːto tʃelˈliːni]; April 24, 1912 – March 25, 1967) was an Italian opera conductor.

== Studies and Early Career ==
Cellini's father Ezio Cellini was an operatic stage director who worked with Arturo Toscanini; his mother Traversa Usellini was a choreographer. Cellini studied piano and cello from an early age, giving his first cello recital at the age of seven. He played piano for ballet companies, and worked on operatic productions connected to his parents. While studying at the Turin Conservatory, he worked with composers Franco Alfano and Giorgio Federico Ghedini. In his late teens, he founded his own jazz band.

In 1936, he decided to pursue conducting, and worked as an assistant conductor in a number of Italian opera houses, apprenticing with conductors such as Tullio Serafin and Gino Marinuzzi. His first major appointment was at the Teatro Verdi (Trieste) in 1940. This position was short-lived; Cellini served in the Italian army for three years during the war, and was in a German prison camp from 1943 to 1945.

In 1947, he was hired to prepare the casts of the Italian-language operas of Glyndebourne Festival Opera, and was unexpectedly asked to conduct The Marriage of Figaro for a Glyndebourne performance at the Edinburgh International Festival. The performance, on September 13, 1947, featured singers including Italo Tajo, Giulietta Simionato, John Brownlee and Eleanor Steber. While coaching at Glyndebourne, he worked with Kathleen Ferrier on her Italian diction for Orfeo ed Euridice. Later that year, he was hired by the Metropolitan Opera in the United States as an assistant conductor.

== Metropolitan Opera ==
Cellini's first two years with the Met were spent coaching singers and accompanying them on tour. He also taught privately, working with young singers such as Maria Russo.

Cellini's first podium assignment was Verdi's Otello performed on tour in Baltimore on March 21, 1949. Baltimore Sun critic Weldon Wallace was unimpressed, writing:

Act I gave promise that Renato Cellini, making his Baltimore debut as conductor, would keep a just relation between singers and instrumentalists, but after Act II was launched this hope had to be abandoned. From there on, it was all too obvious, that Mr. Cellini is a director who likes fortes carried to the double and triple power. [...] Mr. Cellini has an ear for noisy effects, but musically his conducting was largely routine.

Cellini's New York debut was in Verdi's Don Carlos, on April 9, 1952, with Jussi Björling, Eleanor Steber and Regina Resnik in the cast. The following year, he led Aida (with Herva Nelli and Jean Madeira) and La forza del destino (with Zinka Milanov and Mario del Monaco). In 1954, he conducted La forza again (now with Nelli and Leonard Warren), and a double-bill of Mascagni's Cavalleria rusticana and Leoncavallo's Pagliacci. Cellini ultimately conducted a total of 11 performances for the Metropolitan Opera: six in the NY house and five on tour.

During this period, he also conducted at the Cincinnati Summer Opera Company (Madama Butterfly and Il Trovatore, 1951) and the Opera National de Mexico (1948-1950), where he was principal conductor. (He conducted in Mexico for many seasons, from 1947 until 1960.) He also continued to appear as a pianist, accompanying singers such as Italo Tajo, Brian Sullivan (tenor), and Leonard Warren.

His 1950 recording of Verdi's Rigoletto, with Jan Peerce, Warren, Italo Tajo, Erna Berger, and Nan Merriman, was the first American recording of a complete opera by RCA Victor.

== The New Orleans Opera Era (1954-1964) ==
In 1954, Cellini was appointed General Director and Conductor of the New Orleans Opera Association, where he debuted with Puccini's La bohème (staged by Armando Agnini). While there, he founded the Experimental Opera Theatre of America (1954–60) in association with the New Orleans Opera. It was "designed to give young singers an opportunity to be heard in opera." These young singers included Harry Theyard, Mignon Dunn, Norman Treigle, John Reardon, Audrey Schuh, André Turp, Chester Ludgin, John Macurdy, Stanley Kolk, Ara Berberian, Enrico di Giuseppe, Ticho Parly and Benjamin Rayson.

While in New Orleans, Cellini conducted performances of operas by various composers:

Bellini: Norma (with Mija Novich, Richard Cassilly, Irene Kramarich)
Bizet: Carmen (with Gloria Lane, Salvatore Puma, Norman Treigle)
Delibes: Lakmé (with Graciela River, Richard Verreau, Richard Torigi, Nicola Moscona)
Donizetti: L'elisir d'amore (with Eva Likova, Léopold Simoneau, Louis Quilico, Richard Wentworth); Lucia di Lammermoor (with Gianna d'Angelo, Giuseppe Campora)
Floyd: Susannah (with Phyllis Curtain, Norman Treigle, Richard Cassilly)
Giordano: Andrea Chénier (with Salvatore Puma, Brenda Lewis, Benjamin Rayson)
Gluck: Orfeo ed Euridice (with Oralia Dominguez, Irma Gonzales, Luisa deSett)
Gounod: Faust (with Norman Treigle, Richard Verreau, Eva Likova)
Leoncavallo: Pagliacci (with Kurt Baum, Reina Calanche, Igor Gorin)
Mascagni: Cavalleria Rusticana (with Giuseppe Gismondo, Elinor Ross, Igor Gorin)
Massenet: Werther, Manon (with Phyllis Curtin, Nicolai Gedda)
Menotti: Amelia al ballo (with Audrey Schuh)
Mozart: Don Giovanni (with Norman Treigle); Le nozze di Figaro (with Italo Tajo, Lisa della Casa, Walter Cassel, Frances Bible)
Mussorgsky: Boris Godunov (with Boris Christoff)
Ponchielli: La Gioconda (with Zinka Milanov, Giuseppe Gismondo, Cesare Bardell)
Puccini: La bohème; Tosca (with Inge Borkh and Robert Weede; 1963 cast with Dorothy Kirsten, Cesare Bardelli, André Turp); Turandot (with Frances Yeend, Giuseppe Gismondo, Yi-Kwei Sze, Elizabeth Carron)
Rossini: Il barbiere di Siviglia (with Tina Garfi, Luigi Alva, Manuel Ausensi, Salvatore Baccaloni); La cenerentola
R. Strauss: Elektra; Der Rosenkavalier (with Lisa della Casa, Chester Ludgin, Frances Bible, Judith Raskin)
Verdi: Otello (with Ramón Vinay, Herva Nelli); Falstaff (with Leonard Warren); Il trovatore; Un ballo in maschera (with Margherita Roberti, Umberto Borso, Manuel Ausensi); Rigoletto (with Cornell MacNeil, Nicolas Moscona, Gianna d'Angelo, Flaviano Labo); La forza del destino (with Eileen Farrell, Richard Cassilly); La traviata (with Audrey Schuh, John Alexander, Manuel Ausensi)
Wagner: Tannhäuser (with Howard Vandenburg, Blanche Thebom, Aese Loevberg)

During his period with the New Orleans Opera, Cellini continued to conduct elsewhere. In 1960, Cellini conducted in Venezuela at the Caracas Opera Festival, leading performances of Tosca, Rigoletto, La bohème and Lucia di Lammermoor. In the same year, he conducted at Teatro alla Scala in Milan as part of their summer season.

Cellini's high standards may have caused him some difficulty with finding other conducting jobs within the United States. In 1959, he was slated to conduct Verdi's Un ballo in maschera for the Tulsa Opera; the orchestra was made up of members of the Tulsa Philharmonic. After one rehearsal, Cellini announced that he could not conduct the performances due to the playing level of the orchestra and asked to be released from his contract. He was replaced by Carlo Moresco, a seasoned conductor who was flown in from Cincinnati for the remaining rehearsals and performances. The orchestra representative said "He knew the whole score and we had never seen it...yet Cellini expected us to play it letter perfect the first time. [...] We're glad he's gone, it's the worst deal we've ever had."

In 1964, in failing health, Cellini conducted for the last time, giving two performances of Aïda featuring Lucille Udovick, Sandor Konya, Oralia Dominguez, Cesare Bardelli and Norman Treigle. He died on March 25, 1967 (Holy Saturday), in New Orleans at the age of 54, and is buried in Metairie Cemetery. In 2004 his widow, Giuseppina "Pinuccia," moved from New Orleans to Tennessee; she died in 2015.

== Studio discography (complete operas) ==
- Verdi: Rigoletto (Berger, Merriman, Peerce, Warren, Tajo) RCA Victor 1950
- Verdi: Il trovatore (Milanov, Barbieri, Björling, Warren, Moscona) RCA Victor 1952
- Mascagni: Cavalleria rusticana (Milanov, Roggero, Björling, Merrill) RCA Victor 1953
- Leoncavallo: Pagliacci (de los Ángeles, Björling, Franke, Warren, Merrill) RCA Victor 1953

== Studio discography (operatic excerpts and instrumental) ==
- Puccini: La bohème - "Highlights" (Albanese, Munsel, di Stefano, Warren) RCA Victor 1951
- Donizetti: Lucia di Lammermoor - Mad Scene and Tomb Scene (Patrice Munsel, Jan Peerce, Ezio Pinza) RCA Victor 1953
- Bellini & Donizetti: "Presenting Roberta Peters" - Excerpts from La sonnambula, I Puritani, Linda di Chamounix, and Lucia di Lammermoor (Roberta Peters) RCA Victor, ca. 1954
- Verdi: La forza del Destino - "Highlights" (Milanov, Björling, Warren, Moscona) RCA Victor 1955
- "Opera Strings" (Manhattan Pops Orchestra) Time Records, 1962 (identified as "Bellini" on cover)

== "Live" discography ==
- Donizetti: Lucia di Lammermoor (Pons, Tagliavini, Petroff; Mexico City, 1947) Grand Tier
- Massenet: Manon (Gonzalez, di Stefano, Valdengo; Mexico City, 1948) Immortal Performances
- Donizetti: La favorita (Simionato, di Stefano, Siepi, Mascherini; Mexico City, 1949) Vocal Archives
- Rossini: Il barbiere di Siviglia (Simionato, di Stefano, Mascherini, Siepi, Pechner; Mexico City, 1949) Istituto Discografico Italiano
- Massenet: Werther (Simionato, di Stefano; Mexico City, 1949) Immortal Performances
- Massenet: Werther (Rankin, Valletti, Cosenza, Guido; New Orleans, 1956) Bongiovanni
- Verdi: Falstaff (della Chiesa, Schuh, Turp, Warren, Torigi; New Orleans, 1956) VAI
- Verdi: La traviata: excerpts (Kirsten, Hayward, MacNeil; New Orleans, 1958) VAI
- Puccini: Turandot (Yeend, Gismondo, Sze, Carron; New Orleans, 1958) YouTube
- Puccini: La bohème (Albanese, Schuh, di Stefano, Valdengo, Treigle; New Orleans, 1959) VAI
- Puccini: Madama Butterfly (Kirsten, Barioni, Torigi; New Orleans, 1960) VAI
- Saint-Saëns: Samson et Dalila (Stevens, Vinay, Berberian; New Orleans, 1960) VAI
- Verdi: Un ballo in maschera (di Stefano, Roberti, Ausensi, Dominguez; Mexico City, 1960) GDS
- Ponchielli: La Gioconda (Milanov, Kramarich, Gismondo, Bardelli, Wilderman; New Orleans, 1960) VAI
- Verdi: La forza del destino: excerpts (Farrell, Cassilly; New Orleans, 1963) VAI
- Mascagni: Cavalleria rusticana (Milanov, Gismondo, Rayson; New Orleans, 1963) VAI
