= Markheim (opera) =

American opera

- Opera by Carlisle Floyd
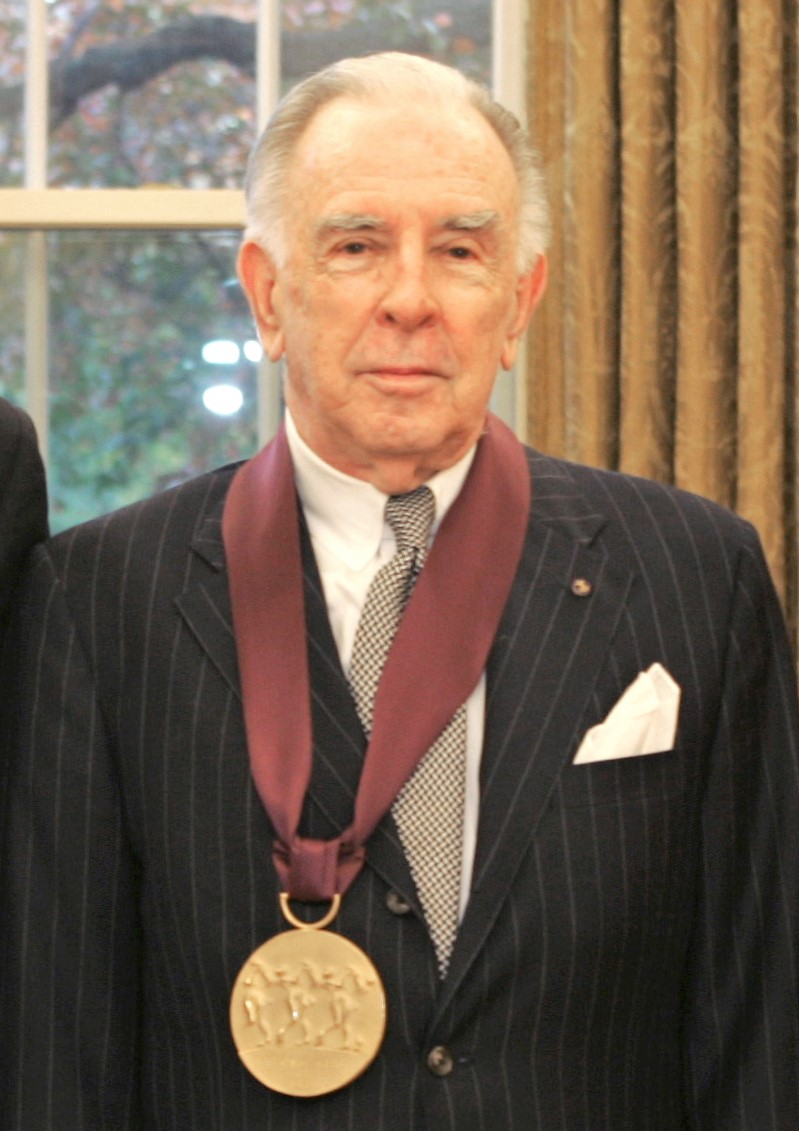
- Carlisle Floyd in 2004 with the National Medal of Arts
- Librettist: Floyd
- Language: English
- Based on: Markheim by Robert Louis Stevenson
- Premiere: March 31, 1966; New Orleans Opera

Markheim is an opera in one act by composer Carlisle Floyd. The work uses an English language libretto by the composer, after the story of the same name by Robert Louis Stevenson. The opera was premiered by the New Orleans Opera on March 31, 1966, under the baton of Knud Andersson, and directed by the composer. The original cast was led by Norman Treigle (to whom the opera was dedicated) in the title role, with Alan Crofoot as Josiah Creach, Audrey Schuh as Tess, and William Diard as the Stranger. A recording of the original cast was released on the Video Artists International record label, in 1995.

In 1974, the University of Washington mounted a student production of the opera helmed by conductor Samuel Krachmalnick which was filmed and broadcast nationally on PBS. It won three Emmy Awards.
