= Luigi Infantino =

Italian opera singer (1921–1991)

- Luigi Infantino (photo with dedication)
- Born: 24 April 1921; Racalmuto, Agrigento, Kingdom of Italy
- Died: 22 June 1991 (aged 70); Rome, Italy
- Occupation: Opera singer (tenor)
- Years active: 1943–1991
- Spouses: Sarah Ferrati (m. 1949; died 1982); Raina Nikolova Infantino (m. 1986) until his death.
- Children: 2 - Monica Infantino and Maria Elena Infantino

Luigi Infantino (Italian: [luˈiːdʒi iɱfanˈtiːno]; 24 April 1921 – 22 June 1991) was an Italian operatic tenor, particularly associated with the lyric Italian and French repertories.

== Early life and background ==
Luigi Infantino was born on 24 April 1921 in Racalmuto, Agrigento, and studied at the Parma Conservatory with Italo Brancucci.

== Career ==
He made his debut in 1943, at the Teatro Regio in Parma, as Rodolfo in La bohème, which was also his debut role at the Teatro San Carlo in Naples, in 1945. With that company, he appeared in London as the Duke in Rigoletto, and Rodolfo. In 1948, he made his debut at the Teatro alla Scala in Milan, as Nadir in Les pêcheurs de perles, later singing Ramiro in La cenerentola, which he also sang that same year at the Verona Arena.

The tenor sang regularly in Naples and Bologna, and made guest appearances at the New York City Opera in 1947: La traviata (with Enzo Mascherini as Giorgio), Rigoletto (opposite Giuseppe Valdengo and Virginia MacWatters), Madama Butterfly, La bohème, Il barbiere di Siviglia (conducted by Julius Rudel) and Don Giovanni (in Theodore Komisarjevsky's production). In 1949, the tenor went on a concert-tour of England and Australia. In 1954, at the Teatro Fenice in Venice, Infantino sang Edgardo to the Lucia of Maria Callas, in Lucia di Lammermoor. Infantino toured England again in 1957 giving a concert at Cheltenham among others. At the Teatro dell'Opera di Roma, he created Amleto, by Mario Zefred, in 1961, and La stirpe di Davide by Franco Mannino, in 1962. In 1964 Infantino reprised his role of Edgardo at the Bombay Opera in India, with soprano Celia Baptista as his Lucia. He was also active throughout his career singing on Italian Radio (RAI), where he gave his last performance in 1973, in Mannino's Il diavolo in giardino.

A stylish lyric tenor with an attractive voice, Infantino can be heard in complete recordings of La traviata (EMI, 1946) and Il barbiere di Siviglia (Cetra, 1950, opposite Giuseppe Taddei and Giulietta Simionato). There is also a live recording of Die Meistersinger von Nürnberg, sung in Italian (Melodram, 1962).

== Personal life ==
Infantino had two wives, Sarah Ferrati until her death in 1982 and Raina Nikolova Infantino, a lyrical soprano from Bulgaria. He had one daughter from each wife.

Infantino died in Rome, aged 70 from a heart attack.

== Filmography ==
Year	Title	Role	Notes
1973	Lucky Luciano	Guest at Luciano’s farewell dinner who sings (Infantino’s own) song “Sicilia Amara”	
1979	Christ Stopped at Eboli	Faccialorda, the Chauffeur who had lived in America and returned to Italy and bought a car with his earnings	
1981	Three Brothers	2nd Friend at Bar	

== Sources ==
- "Infantino, Luigi". Operissimo.
