= Diard =

Diard is a French surname. Notable people with the surname include:

- Pierre-Médard Diard (1794–1863), French naturalist and explorer
- William Diard (1924–2009), American operatic tenor, teacher, musician, and actor
- Éric Diard (born 1965), French politician
