= Markheim =

1885 short story by Robert Louis Stevenson

- Short story by Robert Louis Stevenson
- Language: English
- Genre: Horror

Publication
- Published in: The Broken Shaft: Unwin’s Christmas Annual (ed. H. Norman)
- Publication type: Collection
- Publisher: London: T. Fisher Unwin
- Media type: Print
- Publication date: December 1885

"Markheim" is a short story by Robert Louis Stevenson, originally prepared for the Pall Mall Gazette in 1884, but published in 1885 in The Broken Shaft: Tales of Mid-Ocean as part of Unwin's Christmas Annual. The story was later published in Stevenson's collection The Merry Men and Other Tales and Fables (1887).

== Synopsis ==
The story opens late one Christmas Day in an antique store, presumably in London during the mid 1880s. A man named Markheim has come even though the store is officially closed, and the rather shady dealer points out that whenever he comes to visit after hours, it is usually to privately sell a rare item, claiming it to be from a late uncle's collection he inherited. The dealer hints his suspicions that more likely Markheim stole these items, although it has not stopped him from purchasing them, usually for an amount less than what his client asked for. Markheim visibly flinches at the dealer's not-so-subtle insinuations, but claims that he has not come to sell anything this time, but rather to buy a Christmas present for a woman he will soon marry, implying she is well off. Though somewhat incredulous, the dealer suggests a mirror as a gift, but Markheim takes fright at his own reflection, claiming that no man wants to see what a mirror shows him. Markheim seems strangely reluctant to end the transaction, but when the dealer insists that his visitor must buy or leave, Markheim consents to review more goods. However, when the dealer turns his back to select another item, Markheim pulls out a knife and stabs him to death.

Surrounded by mirrors and ominously ticking clocks, and with only a candle to light up the dark shop, Markheim spends some minutes recovering his nerve when he hears someone moving about upstairs, though he knows the dealer's maidservant has taken the day off and no one should be there. He reassures himself that the outer door is locked, searches the dealer's body for keys and then goes to the upper rooms where the dealer lived to look for money, which he intends to use to start a business. As he searches for the right key to open the dealer's safe, he hears footsteps on the stairs, and a man opens the door and asks, "Did you call me?"

Markheim believes that the stranger is the Devil. Though he never identifies himself, the stranger is clearly supernatural; he says that he has watched Markheim his whole life. He tells Markheim that the servant is returning to the store early, so Markheim had best hurry or face the consequences. He also offers to show Markheim the right key to open the safe, although he predicts that Markheim's business will not be successful. Indeed, the stranger clearly knows that much of Markheim's life has been unsuccessful, consisting of gambling and petty theft. Instead of continuing to loot the house, Markheim tries to justify his life and conduct to the stranger, entering into a discussion of the nature of good and evil. The stranger refutes him on every point, and Markheim is at last obliged to admit that he has thrown his life away and turned to evil.

The servant returns, and as she knocks on the door, the stranger advises Markheim that he can entice her in by telling her that her master is hurt, then kill her and have the whole night to ransack the house. Markheim retorts that while he has lost the love of good, he still hates evil. The face of the stranger undergoes a "wonderful and lovely change", full of "tender triumph", as he disappears. Markheim opens the door and tells the servant to call the police, for he has killed her master.

== Commentary ==
Stevenson combines a moral drama with a gothic horror story. Despite the deliberate ambiguity, most critics view Markheim's visitor as some sort of "good" spirit, whose features suddenly "brightened and softened with a tender triumph" when Markheim decides to give himself up rather than choose to commit a second murder. Michael S. Rose of the New Oxford Review identifies him as Markheim's guardian angel.

According to Ignat Avsey, a university lecturer and distinguished translator of Russian literature, the work was influenced by Fyodor Dostoevsky's novel Crime and Punishment.

== Adaptations ==
- A play produced by J. Fred Zimmerman Sr. opened at the New Amsterdam Theatre in 1906.
- A 1919 opera by Philip Napier Miles; Carnegie award 1921; performed in Bristol 1924; vocal score published by J. Curwen 1926.
- The radio drama anthology series, The Weird Circle, adapted the story for broadcast on 20 May 1945.
- An episode of the 1950s radio drama anthology The Hall of Fantasy was adapted from "Markheim".
- An episode of the 1950s radio drama Dragnet titled "The Big In-Laws" quotes the story.
- A 1953 episode of Theatre Royal, a BBC radio series broadcast on NBC in the United States, with Laurence Olivier as Markheim and Abraham Sofaer as The Stranger.
- It was dramatized as the third episode of the fifth season of the television series Suspense in 1952. The episode was titled "All Hallow's [sic] Eve" and starred Franchot Tone.
- A 1954 short film The Mirror and Markheim, with Philip Saville as Markheim and Christopher Lee as The Visitant, or the Devil.
- The story was dramatized for television as an episode of the anthology series Screen Directors' Playhouse (1955–56); Ray Milland starred as Markheim and Rod Steiger portrayed the Stranger.
- The story was dramatised for television as an episode of the series Rendezvous in 1959. Charles Gray was Markheim and Anthony Dawson the Stranger.
- Carlisle Floyd adapted the story into a one-act opera as a vehicle for Norman Treigle; it was premiered in 1966 and published by Boosey and Hawkes.
- An adaptation by Tom Wright was broadcast on BBC Radio 4 on 17 September 1971 with Tom Watson as Markheim, Malcolm Hayes as The Stranger and Martin Heller as The Dealer; this production was subsequently re-broadcast on BBC Radio 7 and BBC Radio 4 Extra.
- The story was dramatized for the TV Series Theater Macabre (1971–72), hosted by Christopher Lee. In this adaptation, both Markheim and the Visitor are portrayed by the same actor.
- The story was dramatised for Scottish Television in 1974 with Derek Jacobi as Markheim and Julian Glover as the Stranger.
- The radio anthology CBS Radio Mystery Theater adapts Markheim in an episode first aired in 1975 with Kevin McCarthy as Markheim.
- An adaption for opera, with music by Lyell Cresswell and libretto by Ron Butlin, toured New Zealand in 2008.
- In 2009, a reading of the story by Hugh Bonneville was broadcast on BBC Radio 7.
- The Italian composer Carlo Deri composed a one-act opera, Markheim, for which he created a libretto freely inspired by the story; it was premiered in 2015, transcribed from the original as a chamber opera (Pisa, Italy, Teatro Verdi, 18 April 2015).
- The artist Ken Currie produced an etching entitled 'Markheim' in 2015 and critics have referenced the story in relation to his art.

== Sources ==
- Harman, Claire. Myself and the Other Fellow: A Life of Robert Louis Stevenson. HarperCollins (2005): New York. ISBN 0-06-620984-6
