= The Passion of Jonathan Wade =

Musical drama/opera by Carlisle Floyd

- Opera by Carlisle Floyd
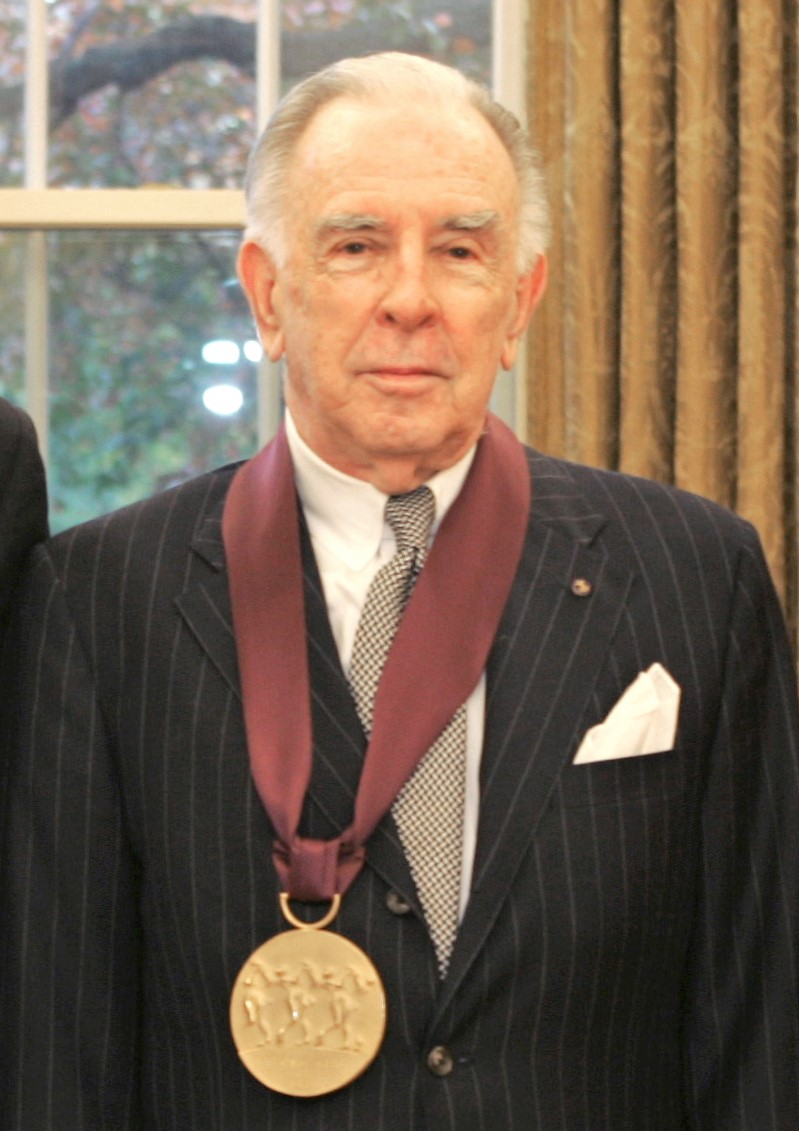
- Carlisle Floyd in 2004 with the National Medal of Arts
- Librettist: Floyd
- Language: English
- Premiere: October 11, 1962; New York City Opera

The Passion of Jonathan Wade is a musical drama, or opera, in three acts by the American composer Carlisle Floyd, who wrote both libretto and music. Commissioned by the Ford Foundation, it was Floyd's most epic opera, set in South Carolina during the Reconstruction era. It was premiered at the New York City Opera on October 11, 1962, directed by Allen Fletcher and conducted by Julius Rudel. Floyd revised it in 1989 for performances at four major opera houses in the U.S., beginning at the Houston Grand Opera.

== History ==
Carlisle Floyd composed The Passion of Jonathan Wade on a commission by the Ford Foundation. The opera's plot was invented by Floyd, based on an idea suggested by his wife, set in South Carolina during the Reconstruction era. It became Floyd's most epic opera. The music embraced tonality and traditional musical idioms such as the spiritual.

The Passion of Jonathan Wade was premiered at the New York City Opera on October 11, 1962, directed by Allen Fletcher and conducted by Julius Rudel. Phyllis Curtin, Theodor Uppman, Norman Treigle and Harry Theyard starred in a large cast.

After the first production, the opera languished for several decades. In 1986 Floyd, who had taught at the University of Houston since 1976, listened to a tape of the 1962 performances, together with David Gockley, general director of the Houston Grand Opera (HGO), and its music director, John DeMain. They immediately began discussing a revision and new production of the opera. Julius Rudel told David Gockley in 1987 that Jonathan Wade was one of the two new operas Rudel had presented at New York City Opera which deserved revival. Floyd thoroughly revised the opera over the course of two years following a co-commission by the HGO and the Greater Miami Opera. Joseph Glatthaar of the University of Houston served as historical consultant. The music, by a composer with a more eclectic taste than before, features more dissonance and bitonality.

The revised version premiered at the Wortham Center for the Performing Arts in Houston on January 18, 1991, conducted by John DeMain, directed by Carlisle Floyd, and designed by Günther Schneider-Siemssen and Allen Charles Klein. It was subsequently presented at Greater Miami Opera, San Diego Opera, and Seattle Opera.

== Synopsis ==
=== Act 1 ===
The Civil War is over. The citizens of Columbia, South Carolina, lament the sorrow and horror of the war. Colonel Jonathan Wade, with his aide, Lieutenant Patrick, leads the Northern troops of occupation into Columbia and greets Judge Townsend with kindness, but the Judge's daughter, Celia, scorns Jonathan.

The judge invites Jonathan to his home and describes the residence's beauty before the war and its mistreatment by Sherman's troops. The maid, Nicey, deems Jonathan a good man, but Celia denounces him for not understanding the depth of Southern suffering. Jonathan bitterly reveals his own losses from the war, and the two young people begin to understand one another.

Northern pardon brokers selling citizenship to ex-Confederates arouse the indignation of Judge Townsend. Lucas Wardlaw, a hotheaded Southerner, expresses the resentment for Northern reformers. With the arrival of Enoch Pratt, chief of the Freedmen's Bureau, tensions erupt. An evening party at the Townsends' home disintegrates as the Southern citizens furiously refuse to submit to the Northern reforms preached by a fervent Pratt.

=== Act 2 ===
Several months later, during a confrontation with Jonathan, Lucas demands back his old way of life, the way of privilege and slavery. Enoch Pratt insists that Judge Townsend be removed from the bench and that the Radical Republicans should use reform as a means of securing future political power. Jonathan sees the shortcomings of all the extremists' demands.

Celia confesses her love for Jonathan, but Lucas taunts the couple with hints of vigilante reprisals. Jonathan's appeal to higher authority to spare Judge Townsend is denied, and he undergoes an agony of conscience. He announces to the Townsends the Judge's dismissal. Judge Townsend rages violently against Jonathan; Celia, though torn between her love for Jonathan and her father, accepts Jonathan's offer of marriage. Her father renounces her.

At the wedding, Nicey sings a spiritual about the wedding feast at Canaan. The Guardian Knights of White Men's Rights harass Nicey and her friends, but Nicey bravely faces them down. Jonathan and Celia try to shelter themselves from the world with their love.

=== Act 3 ===
Jonathan's attempts to remain impartial have only angered both Northerners and Southerners. Pratt accuses Celia of influencing the Colonel and enlists Lieutenant Patrick in a plot to destroy Jonathan. Judge Bell, Judge Townsend's replacement, resigns in disgust at the political corruption, and Jonathan loses his last ally. Pratt tries to provoke Jonathan into insubordination and court-martial, and an order arrives commanding Jonathan to confiscate all of Judge Townsend's possessions. Celia and Jonathan react in anger, fear, and confusion; they yearn for another time and another place where they might find peace. Jonathan decides to desert. Townsend publicly denounces the North, and Jonathan and Celia discover that Lieutenant Patrick has carried out the order of confiscation. Sensing a trap, they plan to escape the country. Suddenly, Jonathan's guards capture three Guardian Knights, Lucas among them, about to burn a torch on Wade's lawn.

In the middle of the night, the full contingent of Guardian Knights arrive to free Lucas, while Union soldiers, led by Pratt and Patrick, also surround the house before attempting to arrest Jonathan for insubordination. Shots are fired, and Jonathan is killed; both sides begin to blame each other. Kneeling by Jonathan's side, Celia silences them, accusing both sides of the murder of a good and decent man. Nicey prays that God accept Jonathan into heaven.

== Roles and premiere casts ==
Main roles and premiere casts are given for both the premiere in New York City in 1962, conducted by Julius Rudel, as the revised version in 1990 in Houston, conducted by John DeMain.

Roles, voice types, premiere casts
Role	Voice type	Premiere cast 1962	Cast revised version 1990
Colonel Jonathan Wade	baritone	Theodor Uppman	Dale Duesing
Celia Townsend	soprano	Phyllis Curtin	Sheryl Woods / Carolann Page
Judge Townsend	bass-baritone	Norman Treigle	Julian Patrick
Lieutenant Patrick	tenor		
Young Girl	soprano		
Nicey Bridges	mezzo-soprano	Miriam Burton	Débria Brown
J. Tertius Riddle	bass-baritone		
Lucas Wardlaw	tenor	Frank Porretta	Joseph Evans
Enoch Pratt	tenor	Norman Kelley	John Duykers
Union League Orator	tenor		
Sergeant Branch	baritone		
Wounded Confederate Soldier	baritone		
Four Black Boys	boy soprano and baritone quartet		
First Soldier	tenor		
Second Soldier	bass		
First Black Senator	tenor		
Second Black Senator	baritone		
First Carpetbagger	tenor		
Second Carpetbagger	baritone		
Judge James C. Bell	baritone	Andrew Frierson	Donnie Ray Albert
Judge McBride	silent role		
Carriage Driver	speaking role		
People of Columbia, Guardian Knights, Union Soldiers, and Nicey's Friends
