= Cold Sassy Tree =

1984 novel by Olive Ann Burns

Cold Sassy tree
- Author: Olive Ann Burns
- Language: English
- Genre: Historical
- Publisher: Houghton Mifflin
- Publication date: November 1984
- Publication place: United States
- Media type: Print (hardback & paperback)
- Pages: 391 pp. (hardback edition)
- ISBN: 0-89919-309-9 (hardback edition)
- OCLC: 10780543
- Dewey Decimal: 813/.54 19
- LC Class: PS3552.U73248 C6 1984
- Followed by: Leaving Cold Sassy

Cold Sassy Tree is a 1984 historical novel by Olive Ann Burns. Set in the U.S. state of Georgia in the fictional town of Cold Sassy (based on the real city of Harmony Grove, now Commerce) in 1906, it follows the life of a 14-year-old boy named Will Tweedy, and explores themes such as religion, death, and social taboos. An incomplete sequel to the novel, Leaving Cold Sassy, was published in 1992 after Burns' death.

== Plot summary ==
On July 5, 1906, Enoch Rucker Blakeslee announces that he intends to marry Miss Love Simpson, a milliner at his store who is years younger than he. This news shocks his family, since his wife Mattie Lou died only three weeks earlier. Rucker’s daughters, Mary Willis and Loma, worry about what the gossips of Cold Sassy will think of their father’s impropriety.

Will Tweedy, Rucker’s 14-year-old grandson and the novel's narrator, supports his grandfather’s marriage. He thinks Miss Love is nice and pretty, although she comes from Baltimore and therefore is practically a Yankee. Will thinks Rucker needs someone to look after him now that Mattie Lou is gone. On the afternoon of Rucker and Miss Love's elopement, Will sneaks off to go fishing in the country, despite the fact that he is supposed to be in mourning for his grandmother. He walks across a high, narrow train trestle and nearly dies when a train speeds toward him. He survives by lying flat between the tracks so the train passes just overhead without touching him. Will becomes a sensation after his near-death experience, and the whole town comes to his house to ask him about the incident. Rucker shocks everyone by arriving with his new bride, Miss Love.

The people of Cold Sassy disapprove of Rucker’s hasty marriage, and rumors spread quickly in the small town, but Will spends much time at the Blakeslee home and becomes friends with Miss Love. He likes her candid opinions and open personality. He also has a little crush on her and often spies on her. He soon learns that it's a marriage of convenience and that Rucker and Miss Love sleep in separate rooms. Miss Love tells Will that she married Rucker only because he promised to deed her the house and furniture. And Rucker married Miss Love to save on the cost of a housekeeper.

Clayton McAllister, Miss Love’s former fiancé from Texas, shows up one day and tries to persuade her to leave with him. He kisses her, but she sends him away contemptuously after kissing him.

Will and some of his friends make a trip into the country to pick up a horse for Miss Love, camping in the mountains along the way. When they return, Will and his father Hoyt try to convince Will’s mother, Mary Willis, to travel to New York. Rucker has bought the tickets to New York so Hoyt, who works for him, can go to purchase new goods for the store. At first Mary Willis refuses to go because she is in mourning, but Will and Hoyt convince her that the trip will do her good. Right after she changes her mind, Rucker decides to use the tickets himself to go to New York with Miss Love. Mary Willis is crushed, and her hatred of Miss Love increases. To take his and Mary Willis’ mind off the disappointment, Hoyt buys a brand-new Cadillac and becomes Cold Sassy's first car owner. Meanwhile, Rucker and Miss Love return from New York. They're now flirtatious and affectionate with each other, and Will wonders if their marriage is becoming more of a "real one." Rucker announces that he too has bought a car and intends to start selling cars in Cold Sassy.

Lightfoot McLendon is a classmate of Will’s who lives in the impoverished section of Cold Sassy known as Mill Town. One day Will takes Lightfoot on a car ride to the cemetery, where he kisses her. A nosy neighbor sees the kiss and tells Will’s parents. Outraged at Will’s association with common people, Will’s parents forbid him to drive the Cadillac for two months. Will gets around his punishment by driving Rucker’s car. One Sunday he, Rucker, and Miss Love take a day trip into the country, where Will gives them driving lessons.

On the way back to Cold Sassy, as he tries to avoid a collision with a Ford wrecked in the middle of the road, Will crashes the car into a creek bed and damages the radiator. While they wait for a repair team, they stay with a nearby family. That night, Will overhears Rucker tell Miss Love that he loves her and wants their marriage to be real. Miss Love declares that she cannot and that no man would want her if he knew her terrible secret. When she finally tells him her secret—her father raped her when she was a child—he says he doesn't care and affirms his love for her.

Eventually, Miss Love and Rucker fall deeply in love. Will’s uncle Camp Williams commits suicide, which begins a dark period in Cold Sassy. Rucker hires Will’s worst enemy, Hosie Roach, to work at the store in Camp’s place; because of his new income, Hosie can marry Will's beloved Lightfoot. A pair of thieves rob and beat Rucker; he recovers from his injuries, but catches pneumonia. As he lies sick in bed, Will overhears him tell Miss Love that God provides strength and comfort to the faithful in times of trouble. Miss Love tells Will that she's pregnant, although Rucker doesn't know. Rucker dies, but his message of faith in God gives Will strength to cope. Though the town and Will's family don't accept Miss Love, she knows they'll accept her child, so she plans to stay in Cold Sassy.

== Adaptations ==
The novel was adapted into a TV movie in 1989, starring Richard Widmark, Faye Dunaway, and Neil Patrick Harris. In 2000, the American composer Carlisle Floyd wrote an opera based on the book.
