= Mr. Piper =

Canadian children's television series

Mr. Piper is a 1963 Canadian children's TV series. The series was created by Martin Andrews and Allan Wargon, who was also the producer. 39 episodes were produced.

== Overview ==
The show's host was a large Canadian opera tenor Alan Crofoot, dressed as a Pied Piper with a flower in his hat. He would introduce four segments in each half-hour programme:

- Teletune - as a narrator of limited animation cartoons of fantasy stories
- Port of Call - presenter of films about children and events in other lands;
- Bag of Tricks - Crofoot performs magic tricks;
- Animal Farm - many farmyard characters telling the story of the day in miniature barnyard sets, featuring Rupert the Rat, Bessie the Bunny, Kookie the Kitten, Harriet Hen, Freddie Frog, Calvin (Rac)Coon and Charlotte Cow.

Thirty-nine episodes were produced.

It was originally shown by CBC Television and also became well known in the United Kingdom, where it was repeated on ITV throughout the 1960s and 1970s, often as part of school summer holiday programming. In May/June 1972, some Mr. Piper episodes were transmitted, dubbed into Italian, by the RAI television network.

== Episode list ==
- Oh My Baby
- Ali Baba
- Brave Molly
- It's a Triple
- Touch Me
- Hasty and the Princess
- The Kindhearted Girl
- The Magic Horn
- The Three Sisters
- The Proud Princess
- It Grew Two Sizes
- Ahmed the Merchant
- Hansel and Gretel
- The Wild Swans
- The Tin Soldier
- The Three Brothers
- Hassan the Simple
- The Three Soldiers
