= Sarah Ferrati =

Italian actress

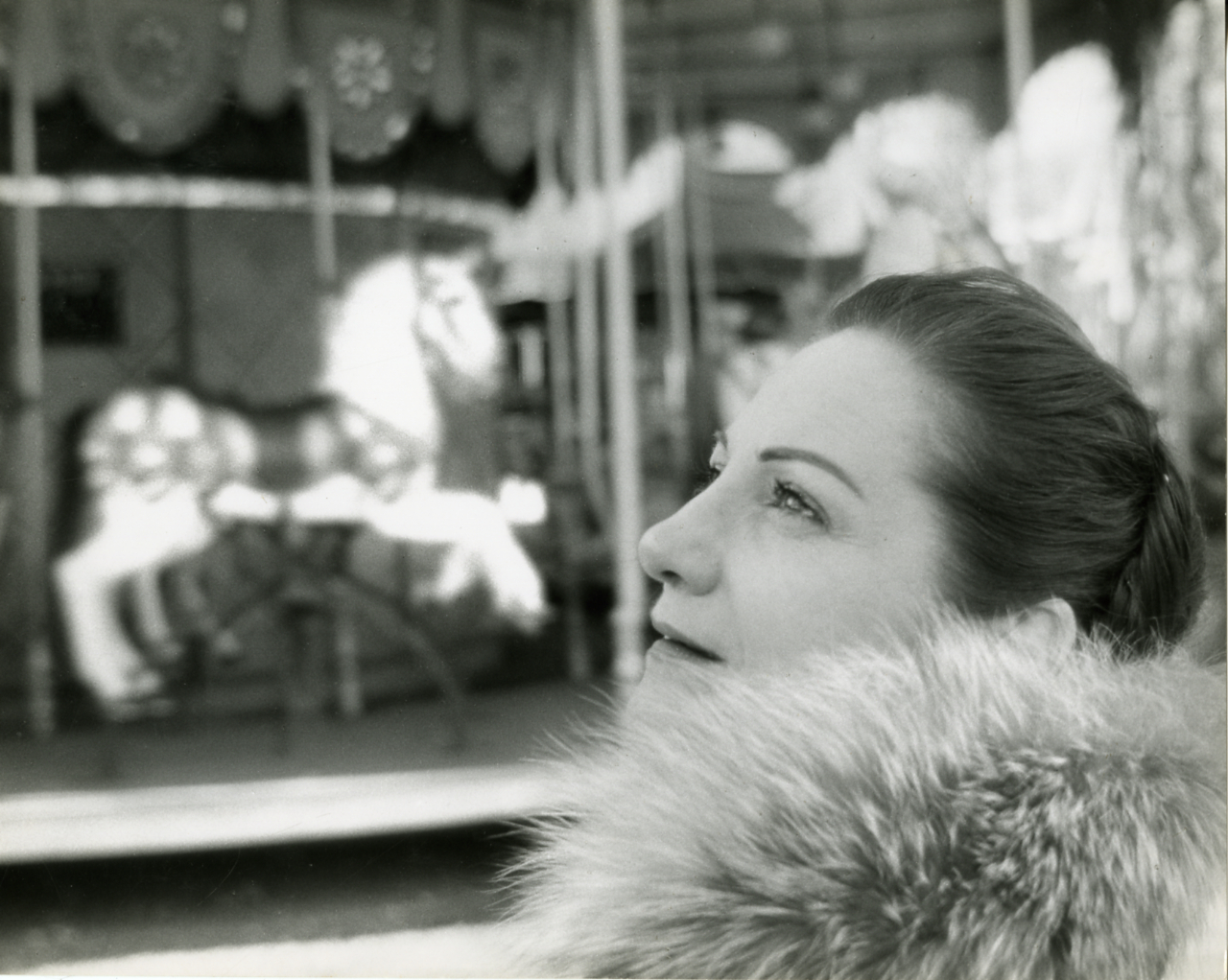
- Ferrati photographed by Paolo Monti (1954)
- Born: 9 December 1909; Prato, Kingdom of Italy
- Died: 3 March 1982 (aged 72); Rome, Italy
- Occupation: Actress
- Spouse: Luigi Infantino (m. October 1948; her death 1982)

Sarah Ferrati (9 December 1909 - 3 March 1982), sometimes spelled Sara Ferrati, was an Italian actress, mainly active on stage.

== Life and career ==
Born in Prato, Ferrati studied acting at the Accademia dei Fidenti in Florence, graduating in 1926. She made her stage debut in 1928 with the theatre company of Luigi Carini. In 1930 she joined the theatre company of husband and wife team Wanda Capodaglio and Uberto Palmarini; serving as both a second leading actress for that company and as the ingénue. In 1931 she led her own company, but it was not a success and disbanded after only a few months.

Ferrati became a lead actress at the Salone Margherita (Roma) in 1932. She had her breakout working at the Teatro Eliseo in plays directed by Orazio Costa and Ettore Giannini. She worked on stage with prominent directors including Luchino Visconti, Franco Zeffirelli, Giorgio Strehler, Jacques Copeau, Max Reinhardt, Renato Simoni, Gianfranco De Bosio. In 1948 she married the opera singer Luigi Infantino. In the 1950s and 1960s she had an intense television career, working with Vittorio Cottafavi, Anton Giulio Majano, Daniele D'Anza, Silverio Blasi, Sandro Bolchi, Mario Landi, among others. Her last appearance was in 1979, in the Augusto Novelli's comedy play Gallina vecchia.
