= Flower and Hawk =

Opera

- Monodrama by Carlisle Floyd
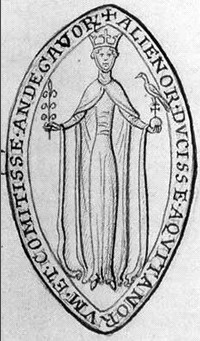
- Seal of Eleanor with flower and hawk
- Librettist: Carlisle Floyd
- Language: English
- Premiere: May 16, 1972; Jacksonville Symphony

Flower and Hawk is a monodrama for soprano and orchestra with music and libretto composed by Carlisle Floyd. A performance lasts about 45 minutes.

Flower and Hawk was Floyd's seventh opera, this one written for Soprano Phyllis Curtin. It had its premiere on May 16, 1972, with Phyllis Curtin and the Jacksonville Symphony conducted by Willis Page. The production was directed by Frank Corsaro.

== Synopsis ==
(quoted entirely from the reference given below:) "Flower and Hawk is based on the life of Eleanor of Aquitaine. In her long life of eighty-two years she was born the Duchess of Aquitaine and Countess of Poitou, became Queen of France through marriage to Louis VII, and later became Queen of England when she married Henry II. The title is derived from her seal (on view in the Louvre) in which she stands holding a hawk in one hand and a flower in the other, suggesting a dualism in her character that is invoked in this work.

"The monodrama takes place in Salisbury Tower in Windsor Castle, where Eleanor has been a prisoner for nearly sixteen years: Henry II had her confined there after she and her sons led an unsuccessful rebellion against him in France. Overcome by feelings of despair, abandonment and betrayal, she considers taking her life with poison but instead resolves to distract herself by recalling happier times. As she relives her positive memories of becoming the Queen of France, the memory of her son Richard's death resurfaces. She also recalls the many conflicts she endured with her two husbands, and again finds herself sinking into hopelessness. Time and again her feelings about Richard's death force her into the present until she finally allows herself release from the guilt and self-doubt surrounding this tragic event. Finally, she is able to re-assume her role as Queen when the tolling of the bells announces the death of Henry and her liberation from the Salisbury Tower."
