= Kirk Redmann =

American operatic tenor

Kirk Redmann (born December 27, 1961) is an American operatic tenor and the son of Audrey Schuh and Kerry P. Redmann.

Born in New Orleans, he graduated from Jesuit High School (New Orleans) in 1979 and then from Tulane University, with a Bachelor of Fine Arts. While there, he participated in productions of The Saint of Bleecker Street (conducted by Thomas Fulton), La rondine (conducted by Maurice Peress), and the role of Camille in The Merry Widow for Tulane Summer Lyric Theatre.

On December 24, 1983, three days before his twenty-second birthday, Redmann became the youngest tenor to debut with the Metropolitan Opera, as the Sailor in the Christmas Eve broadcast of Tristan und Isolde, conducted by James Levine. Brought to the Met by Fulton, he joined the Metropolitan Opera's Young Artist Development Program, his career there consisted of secondary roles in Manon Lescaut (as Edmondo), Khovanshchina (as Kuzka), La traviata (as Gastone), Roméo et Juliette (as Tybalt and later as Benvoglio), Samson et Dalila (the Philistine Messenger), Lucia di Lammermoor (as Lord Arturo Bucklaw), Rigoletto (as Matteo Borsa) and Pong in Turandot.

Elsewhere, Redmann appeared at Opéra de Nice (as Flamand in Capriccio and Don José in Carmen), Hong Kong (as Hoffmann in Les contes d'Hoffmann), West Virginia Symphony (Faust), Lyric Opera of Kansas City (as Michele in The Saint of Bleecker Street and Roméo in Roméo et Juliette), Des Moines Metro Opera, Dicapo Opera Theatre, Il Piccolo Teatro, Long Beach Opera, Michigan Opera Theatre, Mississippi Opera, New Jersey State Opera, Opera Classics of New Jersey, New Orleans Opera Association (La bohème), Opera Omaha, Palm Beach Opera, San Diego Opera, Shreveport Opera, Treasure Coast Opera Society, and the Goldovsky Opera Institute.
