= Sydney Rayner =

American tenor

Sydney Rayner (September 12, 1895 – September 14, 1981) was an American operatic tenor.

Born in New Orleans, Rayner went to Milan in 1924 for vocal studies, which led to his debut in 1927, in Rome, as Rodolfo in La bohème. He was often heard at the Opéra-Comique and the Berlin Staatsoper.

On May 23, 1936, the dramatic tenor made his Metropolitan Opera debut, as Don José in Carmen, opposite Bruna Castagna. He appeared with that company through 1938, in Aïda (with Elisabeth Rethberg), Cavalleria rusticana (with Rosa Ponselle), Carmen again (opposite Ponselle), Les contes d'Hoffmann (conducted by Maurice Abravanel and directed by Herbert Graf), Manon (with Bidu Sayão in her Met debut, later with Grace Moore), Faust, and Pagliacci (opposite Robert Weede in his Met debut).

The tenor recorded for Decca and Sonabel. In 1943, Rayner sang in La forza del destino, opposite Herva Nelli, at the Brooklyn Academy of Music.

Rayner died, aged 86, in East Patchogue, New York.
