= Dodi Protero =

Canadian operatic soprano (1931–2007)

Dodi Protero (March 13, 1931 – April 22, 2007) was a Canadian operatic soprano who had a prolific international career from 1955 through 1980. A singer with a great deal of technical finesse, she excelled in the coloratura soprano and soubrette repertoires. She later had a successful second career as a voice teacher.

== Biography ==
Born Dorothy Ann MacGregor (later adopted the name McIlraith) in Toronto, Ontario, Protero studied singing with James Rossellino in her native city from 1949 through 1959 and her first professional performing experiences were with his Rosselino Opera Company during the early 1950s as Annina in performances of Giuseppe Verdi's La traviata. She was also a pupil of Toti dal Monte in Venice (1955–1957), Ferdinand Grossmann in Vienna (1957), Lorenz Fehenberger in Munich (1963), and in New York City with Rosa Bok (1967–1970) and Oren Brown (1975–1976). She made her European opera debut in 1955 as Papagena in Wolfgang Amadeus Mozart's The Magic Flute at the Teatro di San Carlo. That same year she won the Siena International Singing Competition and in 1957 she won the singing competition at the Salzburg Mozarteum.

In the late 1950s, Protero made appearances at the Bielefeld Opera, the Oper der Stadt Köln, and the Wuppertal Opera. She sang for the first time at the Salzburg Festival in 1959 as Clarice in Joseph Haydn's Il mondo della luna. She also performed in concerts of works by Mozart at Salzburg in 1959 and 1960. She sang Papagena at the Glyndebourne Festival in 1960 and that same year made her first appearance with the Canadian Opera Company (COC) as Ciboletta in Johann Strauss II's Eine Nacht in Venedig. She returned to the COC numerous times during her career, portraying such roles as Gretel in Engelbert Humperdinck's Hänsel und Gretel (1962, 1963), Musetta in Giacomo Puccini's La bohème (1965), Parasha in Igor Stravinsky's Mavra (1965), Oona in the world premiere of Raymond Pannell's The Luck of Ginger Coffey (1967), Rosina in The Barber of Seville (1970), and Marzelline in Ludwig van Beethoven's Fidelio (1970).

Protero performed in several productions with the Sadler's Wells Opera during the 1960s. In 1963 she toured Europe with the Mozarteum Orchestra of Salzburg. She portrayed the role of Mrs. Bedwin in the 1965 Broadway revival of Lionel Bart's Oliver!. Other guest appearances include performances with the Calgary Opera, New Orleans Opera, Pittsburgh Opera, San Antonio Grand Opera Festival, the Stratford Festival, the Teatro dell'Opera di Roma, the Teatro Massimo, Vancouver Opera, and numerous return engagements at the Teatro di San Carlo.

After retiring from the stage in 1980, Protero dedicated her time to teaching singing. She taught on the voice faculties of the Banff School of Fine Arts (1975–1982), the University of Illinois (1976–1987), Opera Music Theater International in New Jersey (1989–93), the Academy of Vocal Arts in Philadelphia (1992–1995) and the Juilliard School (1991–2007). Several of her students have gone on to successful singing careers, including Mario Frangoulis and Joyce DiDonato. She was married for many years to tenor Alan Crofoot and served on the executive board of the New Jersey Opera. She died in New York City at the age of 76.
