= Virginia MacWatters =

Operatic soprano and pedagogue

- Born: June 19, 1912; Philadelphia, Pennsylvania, U.S.
- Died: November 5, 2005 (aged 93)
- Education: Indiana University
- Occupations: Singer (coloratura soprano), professor

Virginia MacWatters (June 19, 1912 – November 5, 2005) was an American coloratura soprano and university professor.

== Early life ==
MacWatters was born in Philadelphia on June 19, 1912 to Frederick K. and Idoleein (née Hallowell) MacWatters. She began her musical studies in piano at the age of eight at the Zeckwer Hahn Musical Academy in Philadelphia; this led to a one year scholarship at the age of twelve to study voice with Henrietta Conrad, formerly of the Dresden Royal Opera. Her first appearance in a singing role was as Mabel in The Pirates of Penzance while still in junior high school.

After graduating from the Philadelphia Normal School for Teachers, MacWatters supported her studies through substitute teaching and singing primarily in churches throughout the Philadelphia area.

== Career ==
She received a scholarship to the renowned Curtis Institute of Music in Philadelphia. MacWatters studied opera and acting under Ernest Lert and Greta Stauber. After graduating from Curtis, she studied with Estelle Liebling in New York City.

After taking second prize in the Metropolitan Opera Auditions of the Air in 1941, MacWatters made her debut with the New Opera Company. She sang 611 Broadway performances of Adele in Rosalinda (an adaptation of Die Fledermaus), conducted by Erich Korngold, from 1942 to 1944. She made her formal operatic debut at the San Francisco Opera, as Musetta in La bohème, in 1944.

The soprano also appeared on Broadway in La serva padrona (as Serpina, 1944) and Mr Strauss Goes to Boston (as Brook Whitney, 1945). MacWatters sang at the New York City Opera from 1946 to 1951, in The Pirates of Penzance (as Mabel, conducted by Julius Rudel), Rigoletto (as Gilda, with Giuseppe Valdengo and Luigi Infantino), Il barbiere di Siviglia (as Rosina, opposite Enzo Mascherini), The Old Maid and the Thief (as Laetitia, with Marie Powers), Le nozze di Figaro (as Susanna), Les contes d'Hoffmann (as Olympia), and Ariadne auf Naxos (as Zerbinetta).

MacWatters appeared at the first season of opera in English at Covent Garden following World War II, in the name part of Manon and as Sophie in Der Rosenkavalier, in 1947. At the New Orleans Opera Association, the coloratura was seen in Il barbiere di Siviglia (1949), Die Fledermaus (1955, with Thomas Hayward,), and Le nozze di Figaro (opposite Norman Treigle in the title role, 1956).

For the Metropolitan Opera, she played Adele in the national tour of Garson Kanin's production of Die Fledermaus, from 1951 to 1952. MacWatters's house debut was also as Adele, with Regina Resnik, and, later, Eleanor Steber, as Rosalinde von Eisenstein. From 1953 to 1955, she also performed in La bohème, opposite Victoria de los Ángeles as Mimì. She returned to the Met in 1957, for Fiakermilli in Arabella, with Lisa della Casa conducted by Erich Leinsdorf.

=== Professor ===
In 1957, a twenty-five year dual performing and teaching career began for MacWatters at Indiana University when she was offered a position on the voice faculty. Known as "Miss Mac" to her students, her devotion to teaching was apparent. In 1979, she was awarded IU's most prestigious honor, the Frederic Bachman Lieber Memorial Award for excellence in teaching.

Following her retirement in 1982 with the rank of Professor Emeritus, MacWatters continued to teach privately.

MacWatters died on November 5, 2005, at the age of ninety-three.
