= Operissimo =

Swiss online music database

Operissimo is an online database based in Zürich, which is dedicated to recording details of classical music concerts and opera performances. The database currently includes biographies on over 7,500 composers and 44,000 performing artists, encompassing both historical and contemporary figures. The biographies contain articles, without attribution, based on the third edition of the Großes Sängerlexikon. It also includes details on more than 47,000 performances, 340 opera houses, and more than 55,000 recordings.
