= Gianna D'Angelo =

American opera singer

- Gianna D'Angelo (photo with 1955 dedication)
- Born: Jane Angelovich
- Occupation: opera soprano singer

Gianna D'Angelo (November 18, 1929 - December 27, 2013) was an American coloratura soprano, primarily active in the 1950s and 1960s.

Born Jane Angelovich in Hartford, Connecticut, she studied first at The Juilliard School in New York City with Giuseppe De Luca. In the early 1950s, she moved to Venice, Italy, where she became a pupil of Toti Dal Monte, who also advised her to italianize her name.

She made her debut in 1954 at the Baths of Caracalla in Rome as Gilda in Rigoletto, a role she would remain closely associated with throughout her career. She was rapidly invited at all the major opera houses of Italy, Naples, Florence, Bologna, Trieste, Parma, Milan, etc. She also made appearances at the Paris Opéra and the Glyndebourne Festival as Rosina in Il barbiere di Siviglia and at the Edinburgh Festival as Norina in Don Pasquale.

She made her American debut at the Cosmopolitan Opera in San Francisco, in March 1959, in the title role of Lucia di Lammermoor (opposite Giuseppe Campora and Norman Treigle), and at the Metropolitan Opera in New York, on April 5, 1961 as Gilda (with Robert Merrill as Rigoletto), and remained there for eight seasons, appearing in roles such as: Lucia, Amina, Rosina, Norina, Zerbinetta, the Queen of the Night. She also appeared in Philadelphia, Houston, New Orleans, etc.

D'Angelo made few commercial recordings. The most notable was Musetta in La bohème with Renata Tebaldi, Carlo Bergonzi and Ettore Bastianini under Tullio Serafin, recorded in 1959 in Rome. Other recordings include Il barbiere di Siviglia and Rigoletto both with baritone Renato Capecchi, as well as the doll Olympia in Les contes d'Hoffmann, opposite Nicolai Gedda. A live performance of I puritani from Trieste in 1966, has also been recently released on DVD.

After retiring from singing, she became a voice teacher at the Jacobs School of Music, where she remained from 1970 until 1997.

She died on December 27, 2013, at the age of 84, at Lawyers Glen Assisted Living in Mint Hill, North Carolina.

== References & Sources ==
- The Metropolitan Opera Encyclopedia, edited by David Hamilton (Simon and Schuster, New York 1987). ISBN 0-671-61732-X
- Hardy Classic Video Biography.
