= Olive Ann Burns =

American novelist

Olive Ann Burns (July 17, 1924 – July 4, 1990) was an American writer from Georgia best known for her single completed novel, Cold Sassy Tree, published in 1984.

== Background ==
Olive Ann Burns was born in Banks County, Georgia. Her father was a farmer but was forced to sell his farm in 1931 during the Great Depression. The Burns family then moved to Commerce, Georgia. Burns attended Mercer University, where she wrote for the college magazine. Her sophomore year she transferred to the University of North Carolina at Chapel Hill, where she majored in journalism.

== Career ==
Burns worked for the Atlanta Journal and wrote under the pseudonym "Amy Larkin". She married Andy Sparks, a fellow journalist. In 1971 Burns began writing down family stories as dictated by her parents. In 1975 she was diagnosed with lymphoma and began to change the family stories into a novel that would later become Cold Sassy Tree. The novel was finally published eight years after it was begun, in 1984. Burns received so many letters pleading for a follow-up novel that she began writing Leaving Cold Sassy. Burns died of heart failure in 1990, at age 65, in a hospital in Atlanta, Georgia, before finishing the manuscript, and the uncompleted novel was published in 1992 along with her notes.

== Works ==
- Cold Sassy Tree, published in 1984
