= Carlisle Floyd =

American composer (1926–2021)

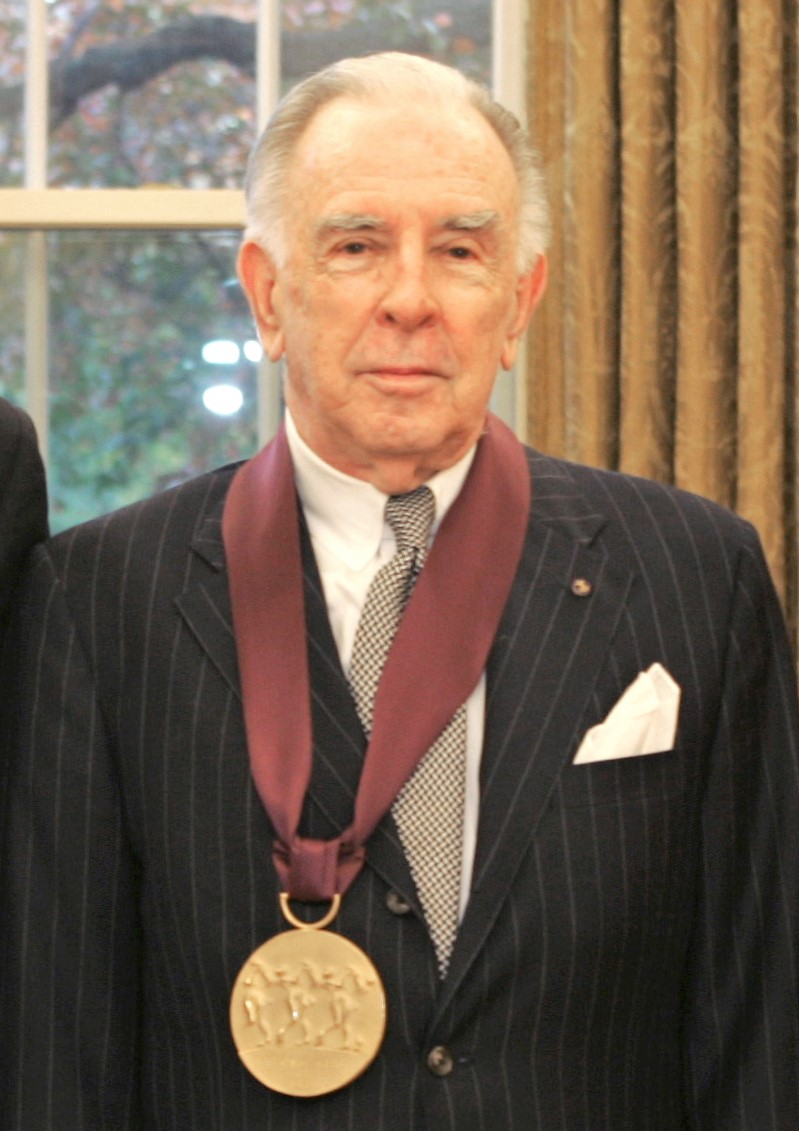
- Floyd with National Medal of Arts in 2004
- Born: June 11, 1926; Latta, South Carolina, U.S.
- Died: September 30, 2021 (aged 95); Tallahassee, Florida, U.S.
- Education: Converse College; Syracuse University
- Known for: Operas; Susannah
- Notable work: List of compositions
- Awards: National Medal of Arts; Full list

Carlisle Sessions Floyd (June 11, 1926 – September 30, 2021) was an American composer primarily known for his operas. These stage works, for which he wrote not only the music but also the librettos, typically engage with themes from the American South, particularly the Post-civil war South, the Great Depression and rural life. His best known opera, Susannah, is based on a story from the Biblical Apocrypha, transferred to contemporary rural Tennessee, and written for a Southern dialect. It was premiered at Florida State University in 1955, with Phyllis Curtin in the title role. When it was staged at the New York City Opera the following year, the reception was initially mixed; some considered it a masterpiece, while others degraded it as a 'folk opera'. Subsequent performances led to an increase in Susannah's reputation and the opera quickly became among the most performed of American operas.

In 1976, he became M. D. Anderson professor at the University of Houston. He co-founded the Houston Opera Studio for the training of young singers. Floyd is regarded as the "Father of American opera".

== Life and career ==
=== Youth and education ===
Floyd was born in Latta, South Carolina, on June 11, 1926, to Carlisle and Ida (née Fenegan) Floyd. His father was his namesake and a Methodist minister at the local church; on both sides his family was descended from among the first European immigrants to the Carolinas. He had a sister, Ermine, along with a sizable extended family. Being raised in the Southern United States, Floyd would have been well aquatinted with typical Southern ideals of the time, such as Southern hospitality, extra caution to avoid offending others, Protestantism and a general disliking towards the Northerners. Also prominent in his Southern upbringing were revival meetings, and the "small-town bigotry", which later influenced his work. (Note: Floyd later reflected on these, saying "The thing that horrified me already as a child about revival meetings was mass coercion, people being forced to conform to something against their will without even knowing what they were being asked to confess or receive".) Though the family was not familiar with contemporary classical music, Floyd's mother enjoyed music and poetry, often hosting family hymn singing events. She also gave Floyd his first piano lessons. Floyd attended North High School in North Carolina.

Though American involvement in World War II had begun in 1941, Floyd's asthma prevented his conscription. He attended Converse College of Spartanburg, South Carolina, in 1944, studying piano with composer Ernst Bacon. In 1945 Bacon left Converse to become director of the music school at Syracuse University, New York, a considerably more multicultural institution. Floyd followed Bacon to Syracuse and received a Bachelor of Music in 1946. The following year, Floyd became part of the piano faculty at Florida State University in Tallahassee. He stayed there for thirty years, eventually becoming Professor of Composition. He received a master's degree at Syracuse in 1949.

=== Emerging composer and Susannah ===
While at FSU, Floyd gradually became interested in composition. His first opera was Slow Dusk to his own libretto, and was produced at Syracuse in 1949. His next opera, The Fugitives, was seen at Tallahassee in 1951 but was withdrawn.

Floyd's third opera was his greatest success: Susannah. It was premiered at Florida State at the Ruby Diamond Auditorium in February 1955, with Phyllis Curtin in the title role and Mack Harrell as the Reverend Olin Blitch. The following year, the opera was given at the New York City Opera, winning him international recognition. Erich Leinsdorf conducted, with Curtin and Norman Treigle as Blitch. The opera received the New York Music Critics' Circle Award. It was selected to be America's official operatic entry at the 1958 World's Fair in Brussels, directed by Frank Corsaro, with Curtin, Treigle and Richard Cassilly.

=== Further operas ===
Later in 1958, Floyd's Wuthering Heights (after Emily Brontë) premiered at the Santa Fe Opera, with Curtin as the heroine. In 1960, at Syracuse, his solo cantata on biblical texts, Pilgrimage, was first heard with Treigle as soloist. The Passion of Jonathan Wade, commissioned by the Ford Foundation, was Floyd's most epic opera, set in South Carolina during the Reconstruction era. It was premiered at the New York City Opera on October 11, 1962. Theodor Uppman, Curtin, Treigle and Harry Theyard performed in a large cast, conducted by Julius Rudel and directed by Allen Fletcher. Floyd revised it in 1989 for performances at four major opera houses in the U.S., beginning at Houston Grand Opera.

Floyd's next opera was The Sojourner and Mollie Sinclair, which was a comedy around Scottish settlers of the Carolinas. Patricia Neway and Treigle created the title roles with Rudel conducting. The opera Markheim (after Robert Louis Stevenson) was first shown at the New Orleans Opera Association in 1966, with Treigle (to whom it was dedicated) and Audrey Schuh heading the cast. Floyd himself served as stage director.

The opera Of Mice and Men (after John Steinbeck) was commissioned by the Ford Foundation. After a long gestation period, it was premiered at the Seattle Opera in 1970, directed by Corsaro. A monodrama on the royal subject of Eleanor of Aquitaine, Flower and Hawk, premiered in Jacksonville, Florida, with Curtin directed by Corsaro. The production was also presented at Carnegie Hall.

Bilby's Doll (after Esther Forbes) was commissioned by the Houston Grand Opera where it was premiered in 1976 with Christopher Keene conducting and David Pountney directing. Floyd composed Willie Stark (after Robert Penn Warren) also for Houston, where it was first heard in 1981 in a staging by Harold Prince. After a hiatus of almost twenty years, another Floyd opera premiered in Houston in 2000, Cold Sassy Tree (after Olive Ann Burns). Patrick Summers conducted, Bruce Beresford directed, and Patricia Racette led the cast. It was subsequently produced by several American opera houses.

In 1976, he became M. D. Anderson professor at the University of Houston. There, he co-founded the Houston Opera Studio, together with David Gockley, as an institution of the University of Houston and Houston Grand Opera, with students including Michael Ching and Craig Bohmler.

=== Retirement and later years ===
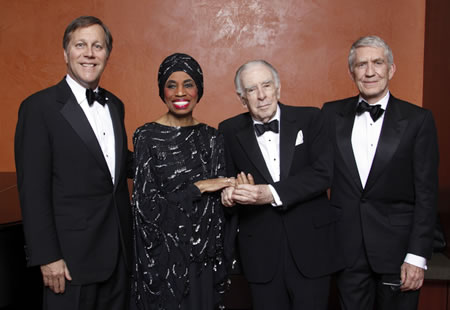
Carlisle Floyd (second from right) at the National Endowment for the Arts honors in 2004, with NEA Chairman Dana Gioia (left), Leontyne Price and Richard Gaddes

After retirement from the university in Houston in 1996, Floyd lived in Tallahassee again. He had composed a Piano Sonata in the 1950s (1957, two years after Susannah) for Rudolf Firkušný, who played it at a Carnegie Hall recital, but it languished until Daniell Revenaugh recorded it in 2009 at the age of 74. Revenaugh worked with the composer in learning the piece (Floyd himself had never learned it), and their rehearsal sessions and the live recording itself were filmed for posterity. The recording was made on the Alma-Tadema Steinway that graced the White House during the presidencies of Theodore Roosevelt and Woodrow Wilson.

The Houston Grand Opera produced a new opera by Floyd on March 5, 2016, Prince of Players, a chamber opera about the 17th-century actor, Edward Kynaston, conducted by Summers. A live recording of the premiere was nominated for a Grammy Award.

Floyd died on September 30, 2021, in Tallahassee, at the age of 95. He had no children, but was survived by four nieces, the daughters of Ermine. His publisher Boosey & Hawkes, announced his death and did not relay the cause.

== Music ==
=== Legacy and reputation ===
Floyd is primarily known for his operas, which make up the bulk of his compositional output. Like Wagner and Menotti, Floyd wrote the librettos to his operas. His best-known opera, Susannah, is regarded as his magnum opus. The National Public Radio's Tom Huizenga posits the work as suitable contender to be considered the archetypal "Great American Opera". (Note: The idea of the "Great American Opera" originates from an earlier debate concerning the Great American Novel.) Patricia Racette declared that "If it is not the greatest American opera, it's certainly among the great American operas". According to Opera News, Susannah is the most frequently performed American opera after Gershwin's Porgy and Bess and Menotti's Amahl and the Night Visitors. The Daily Telegraph, however, claimed it is the most "widely performed" American opera, purportedly outnumbering some works by Mozart, Verdi and Puccini. In addition to Gershwin and Menotti, Floyd stands with Adams, Barber, Bernstein, Glass and Rorem in the pantheon of preeminent 20th-century American opera composers.

=== Selected recordings ===
==== Discography ====
- Susannah (Studer, Hadley, Ramey; Nagano, 1993–94) Virgin Classics/EMI
- Susannah (Curtin, Cassilly, Treigle; Andersson, 1962) [live] VAI
- Wuthering Heights (Jarman, Mentzer, Markgraf; Mechavich, 2015) [live] Reference Recordings
- Pilgrimage: excerpts (Treigle; Torkanowsky, 1971) Orion
- The Sojourner and Mollie Sinclair (Neway, Treigle; Rudel, 1963) VAI
- Markheim (Schuh, Treigle; Andersson, 1966) [live] VAI
- Of Mice and Men (Futral, Griffey, Hawkins; Summers, 2002) [live] Albany Records
- Cold Sassy Tree (Racette; Summers, 2000) [live] Albany Records

==== Videography ====
- Susannah: Revival Scene (Treigle; Yestadt, Treigle, 1958) [live] Bel Canto Society
- Willie Stark (Jesse; J.Keene, McDonough, 2007) [live] Newport Classic
- Susannah (Spatafora, Webb, Donovan; Sforzini, Unger, 2014) [live] Naxos

== List of compositions ==
Floyd's compositions were published by Boosey & Hawkes. (Note: For Floyd's works on the Boosey & Hawkes website see: "Your search for 'Composer: Carlisle Floyd'". Boosey & Hawkes.)

List of compositions by Carlisle Floyd (Note: Only Floyd's major works are listed. Stiller (2022) notes that he wrote other solo piano and pedagogical works.)
Title	Year	Genre	Subject
=== Works for stage ===
Slow Dusk	1949	Musical play 1 act	–
The Fugitives	1951 (unfinished)	Unfinished stage work	–
Susannah	1955	Musical drama 2 acts	Susanna and the Elders
Wuthering Heights	1958 rev. 1959	Musical drama 3 acts (& prologue)	Wuthering Heights by Emily Brontë
The Passion of Jonathan Wade	1962 rev. 1991	Opera; 3 acts	–
The Sojourner and Mollie Sinclair	1963	Comic opera 1 act	–
Markheim	1966	Opera; 1 act	"Markheim" by Robert Louis Stevenson
Of Mice and Men	1970	Musical drama 3 acts	Of Mice and Men by John Steinbeck
Flower and Hawk	1972	Monodrama; 1 act	–
Bilby's Doll	1976	Opera; 3 acts	A Mirror for Witches by Esther Forbes
Willie Stark	1981	Opera; 3 acts	All the King's Men by Robert Penn Warren
Cold Sassy Tree	2000	Comic opera 3 acts	Cold Sassy Tree by Olive Ann Burns
Prince of Players	2016	Opera; 2 acts	Fictional portrayal of Edward Kynaston's life
=== Other works ===
Pilgrimage	1956	Song cycle Baritone and orchestra	Various biblical texts
Piano Sonata	1957	Solo piano	–
The Mystery	1960	Song cycle Soprano and orchestra	Text by Gabriela Mistral
Introduction, Aria, and Dance	1967	Orchestral	–
In Celebration	1971	Orchestral	–
Citizen of Paradise	1983	Song cycle Mezzo-soprano and piano	Text by Emily Dickinson
Flourishes	1987	Orchestral; Fanfare	–
A Time to Dance	1994	Orchestral; Baritone, chorus and orchestra	–
Soul of Heaven	1995	Song cycle Voice and piano	Text by various authors

== Awards and honors ==
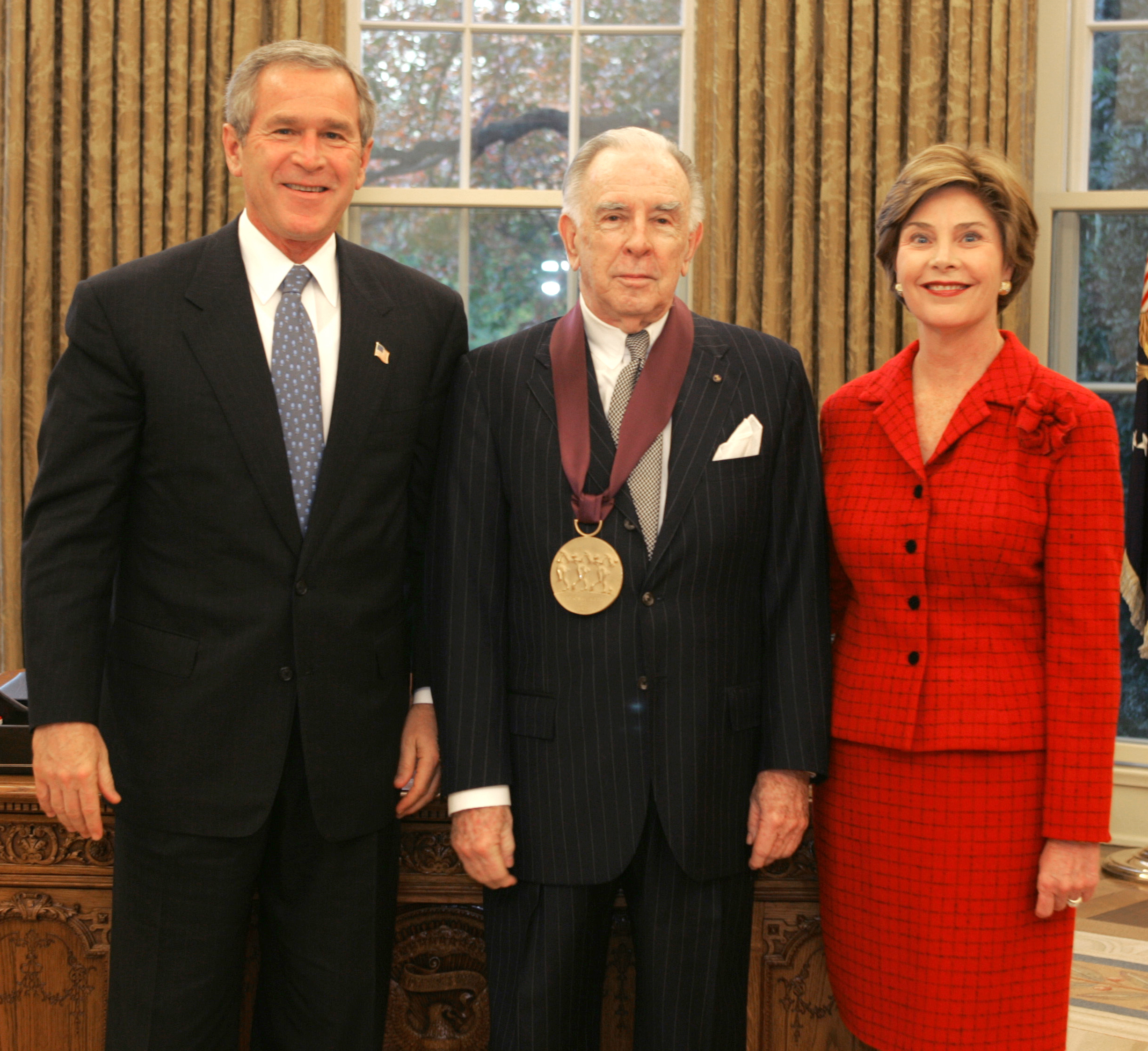
George W. Bush and Laura Bush present the National Medal of Arts, 2004

- 1956 Guggenheim Fellowship
- 1957 Citation of Merit from the National Association of American Conductors and Composers
- 1959 Ten Outstanding Young Men of the Nation Award from the U.S. Junior Chamber of Commerce
- 1964 Distinguished Professor of Florida State University Award
- 1983 Honorary degree from Dickinson College
- 1983 National Opera Institute's Award for Service to American Opera – the highest honor the institute bestows
- 1993 Brock Commission from the American Choral Directors Association.
- 2001 Inducted into the American Academy of Arts and Letters
- 2004 National Medal of Arts from the White House
- 2005 Honorary Doctorate from Florida State University
- 2008 National Endowment for the Arts Opera Honoree for lifetime work
- 2010 Anton Coppola Excellence in the Arts Award from Opera Tampa
- 2012 Phi Mu Alpha Sinfonia Man of Music – the highest honor for a member of the American music fraternity.
