= Enzo Mascherini =

Italian opera singer

- Enzo Mascherini (photo with dedication)
- Occupation: opera singer

Enzo Mascherini (6 August 1910, Florence - 29 July 1981, Livorno) was an Italian operatic baritone, one of the leading baritones of his generation.

He studied in Florence with Titta Ruffo and Riccardo Stracciari and made his debut there in 1937, as Giorgio Germont in La traviata, and also sang at the premiere of Gian Francesco Malipiero's Antonio e Cleopatra, in 1938. He made his debut at the San Carlo in Naples, in 1939, and at the Teatro alla Scala in Milan, in 1940. He appeared in two legendary performances opposite Maria Callas, the first at the Maggio Musicale Fiorentino in 1951, as Montforte in I vespri siciliani, under Erich Kleiber, and on opening night of the 1952-53 season at La Scala, as Macbeth, under Victor de Sabata. He also appeared there in La bohème (with Giuseppe di Stefano, 1952), La favorite (1953), Faust (with Dame Elisabeth Schwarzkopf, 1954), Don Carlos (with Callas, 1954), and, again, La bohème (conducted by Leonard Bernstein, 1955).

After the war, he began an international career, appearing in Paris, Vienna, Prague, London, Mexico City, Rio de Janeiro, Chicago, San Francisco, etc. In 1946 and 1947, Mascherini appeared at the New York City Opera, in La bohème (as Marcello), La traviata (with Dorothy Kirsten), Pagliacci (as Silvio, later as Tonio), Rigoletto, Andrea Chénier (opposite Vivian della Chiesa, directed by Theodore Komisarjevsky), and Il barbiere di Siviglia (with Luigi Infantino and Virginia MacWatters).

Enzo Mascherini in Un ballo in maschera, Teatro Comunale, Florence

He made his debut at the Metropolitan Opera on 7 December 1949 as Marcello in Giacomo Puccini's La bohème with Bidu Sayão as Mimì, Ferruccio Tagliavini as Rodolfo, Lois Hunt as Musetta, and Giuseppe Antonicelli conducting. He performed in several other roles at the Met during the 1949-1950 season, including Germont in La traviata (with Licia Albanese as Violetta and Jan Peerce as Alfredo), Lescaut in Manon Lescaut (with Richard Tucker as Des Grieux), Valentin in Faust (with di Stefano in the title role), and the title role in Rigoletto (with Erna Berger as Gilda). He also went on tour to South Africa in 1951.

A fine singing-actor with a powerful voice and solid technique, he taught in Florence after retiring from the stage. Among his pupils was the Swiss bass-baritone Alexander Malta.

He can be heard on disc in Dom Sébastien, opposite Fedora Barbieri; La favorite, opposite Giulietta Simionato; Tosca, opposite Renata Tebaldi; and the aforementioned "live" I vespri siciliani and Macbeth with Callas. In 1949, the baritone participated in a cinematic version of Il trovatore (available from the Bel Canto Society).

== Sources ==
- Le guide de l'opéra, Roland Mancini & Jean-Jacques Rouveroux, Fayard, 1986, ISBN 2-213-01563-5
