= Enzo Sordello =

Italian opera singer (1927–2008)

Enzo Sordello in La vestale, 1954

Enzo Sordello (20 April 1927 - 15 April 2008) was an Italian operatic baritone.

== Biography ==
Enzo Sordello born in Pievebovigliana, he went on to study at the Conservatorio Giuseppe Verdi in Turin and privately with Carlo Tagliabue. In 1952, he won the International Competition organized by the Teatro alla Scala in Milan, and began appearing there in small roles. He first won recognition when he sang the role of Cinna in Spontini's La vestale, opposite Maria Callas, in a production by Luchino Visconti.

This led to his Metropolitan Opera debut in 1956, as Marcello in La bohème, followed by Malatesta in Don Pasquale. He also sang Enrico in Lucia di Lammermoor, opposite Maria Callas, who, rumour has it, had him fired after the performance for holding a note longer than hers.

He went on singing at most of the major opera houses of the world, notably, the Vienna State Opera, the Deutsche Oper Berlin, the Teatro Colón, as well as at the Glyndebourne Festival and Bregenz Festival. His sang in a wide variety of roles of the Italian and French repertoire, from baroque to contemporary works, but with a particular predilection for Figaro in Il Barbiere di Siviglia and the title-role in Rigoletto.

In 1961, he sang Filippo in Beatrice di Tenda in a concert version by the American Opera Society in New York City, opposite Joan Sutherland and Marilyn Horne.

Sordello retired from the stage in 1982. He lived in Roccavione where he died on April 15, 2008.

== Discography ==
- Madama Butterfly - Renata Tebaldi, Carlo Bergonzi, Fiorenza Cossotto, Coro e Orchestra dell' Accademia di Santa Cecilia, Tullio Serafin - (Decca, 1958)
- La fanciulla del West - Birgit Nilsson, Joao Gibin, Andrea Mongelli, Coro e Orchestra del Teatro alla Scala, Lovro von Matačić - (EMI, 1958)
- L'amore dei tre re - Luisa Malagrida, Pierre Duval, Ezio Flagello, Coro e Orchestra Sinfonica di Roma, Richard Karp - (Delphi, 1969)
