= Leonard Warren =

American operatic baritone (1911–1960)

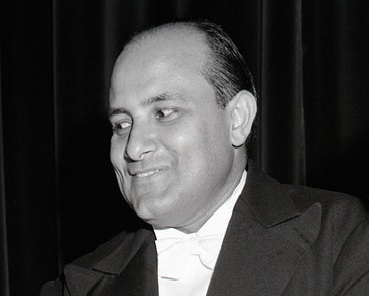
Warren in 1950

Leonard Warren (April 21, 1911 – March 4, 1960) was an American operatic baritone who was a leading artist for many years with the Metropolitan Opera in New York City. Especially noted for his portrayals of the major baritone roles in the operas of Giuseppe Verdi, he had few rival baritones in his time. His power and range were the highlights of his vocal instrument.

== Biography ==
Born Leonard Warenoff in the Bronx to Russian Jewish immigrant parents, He studied singing with Sidney Dietch Warren was first employed in his father's fur business. In 1935, he joined the chorus at Radio City Music Hall. In 1938, he entered the Metropolitan Opera Auditions of the Air. The Met sent him to Italy that summer with a stipend to study. He later studied singing privately with Dorothy DiScala.

Returning to the United States, Warren made his concert debut at the Metropolitan Opera in excerpts from La traviata and Pagliacci during a concert in New York City in November 1938. His operatic debut took place there in January 1939, when he sang Paolo in Simon Boccanegra. A recording contract with RCA Victor soon followed.

Warren later sang in San Francisco, Chicago, Mexico City and Buenos Aires, and he appeared at La Scala in Milan in 1953. In 1958, he made a tour of the Soviet Union, but for most of his career he remained in New York City and sang at the Met. In 1950, he converted to Roman Catholicism, the faith of his wife Agatha, and became extremely devout.

Although he sang Tonio in Pagliacci, Escamillo in Carmen, and Scarpia in Tosca, he was particularly acclaimed as an interpreter of the great Verdi baritone roles, above all the title role in Rigoletto, which was captured in 1950 on an RCA Victor recording with soprano Erna Berger and tenor Jan Peerce, conducted by Renato Cellini, the first opera recorded for release on LP records. In 1944, Warren also sang the role of Rigoletto in a Red Cross benefit concert held at Madison Square Garden featuring the final act of the opera. Jan Peerce again sang the role of the Duke and Zinka Milanov was Gilda, with the NBC Symphony Orchestra conducted by Arturo Toscanini. This Rigoletto excerpt was later released on records and CD by RCA Victor and the entire concert was available years later on various unofficial CD releases. Warren's other published complete opera recordings include La traviata with Rosanna Carteri, Cesare Valletti, and conductor Pierre Monteux; Tosca, Aida, and Il trovatore, each with Zinka Milanov and Jussi Björling; La forza del destino with Milanov, Giuseppe Di Stefano, Rosalind Elias and Giorgio Tozzi; a second recording of Il trovatore with his final tenor co-star, Richard Tucker, featuring a young Leontyne Price in her Met debut role of Leonora; and Verdi's Macbeth, with Leonie Rysanek and Carlo Bergonzi. Several private and unofficial recordings exist of Warren in live performances at the Metropolitan Opera including his Simon Boccanegra and Iago in Otello. He also sang Renato in an RCA Victor album of highlights from Un ballo in maschera made with Marian Anderson as Ulrica on the occasion of her Met debut in 1955.

In 1948, Warren sang in the first-ever live television broadcast from the Metropolitan Opera. Verdi's Otello was aired complete by ABC-TV on November 29, 1948, the opening night of the season. Ramón Vinay was Otello, Licia Albanese was Desdemona, and Warren sang the role of Iago.

In 1958, Warren toured the USSR. He was one of the few American artists invited to do so and had great success at concerts in Leningrad and Kiev. The concerts were recorded and excerpts have been released by RCA Victor on the album Leonard Warren: On Tour in Russia, available on both LP and CD.

In his book The American Opera Singer (1997, ISBN ), Peter G. Davis wrote of Warren:

The rich, rounded, mellow quality of [Warren's] voice, fairly bursting with resonant overtones, may not have been to every taste, particularly those preferring a narrower baritonal focus that "speaks" more quickly on the note. But by any standards it was a deluxe, quintessentially "Metropolitan Opera sound", one that seemed to take on a special glow and lustrousness as it opened up and spread itself generously around the big auditorium. And of course the easy top was its special glory—when relaxing with friends Warren would often tear into tenor arias like "Di quella pira" and toss off the high Cs that many tenors lacked. He could have, but never did, overindulge that applause-getting facility.

=== Death ===
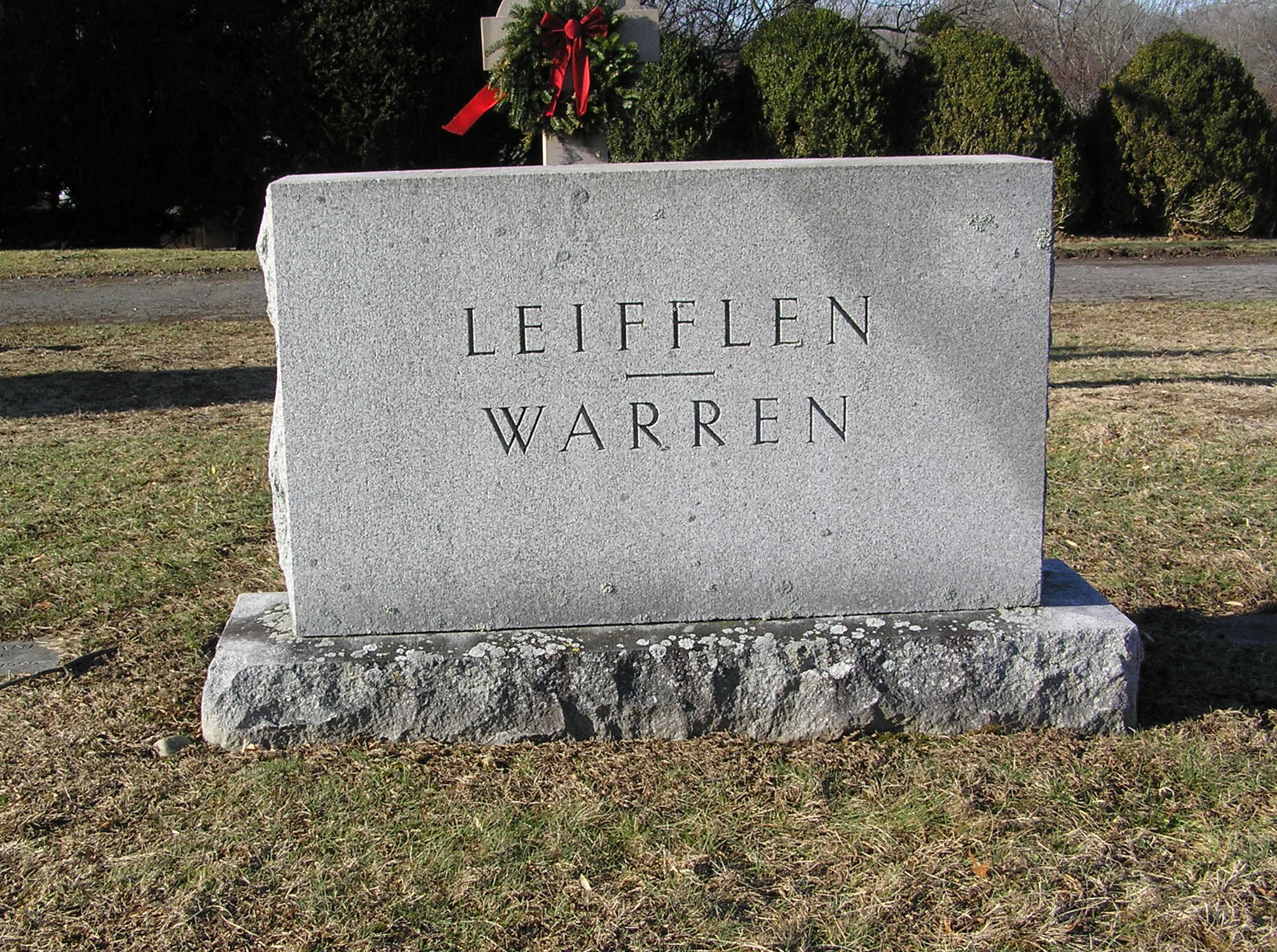
Warren's gravesite in Saint Mary's Cemetery

Warren's last complete performance was in the title role of Simon Boccanegra on March 1, 1960, at the Met. Three days later, on March 4, during a performance of La forza del destino with Renata Tebaldi as Leonora and Thomas Schippers conducting, Warren suddenly collapsed and died on stage. Eyewitnesses including Rudolf Bing reported that Warren had completed Don Carlo's Act III aria, which begins Morir, tremenda cosa ("to die, a momentous thing"), and was supposed to open a sealed wallet, examine the contents and cry out "È salvo, o gioia" (He is safe, oh joy), before launching into the vigorous cabaletta. While Bing reports that Warren simply went silent and fell face-forward to the floor, others state that he started coughing and gasping, and that he cried out "Help me, help me!" before falling to the floor, remaining motionless. Roald Reitan, singing the Surgeon, was on stage with Warren at the time of his death, and attempted to render aid.

Although no autopsy was performed, Warren's death was initially thought to have been caused by a massive cerebral hemorrhage, but was later believed by the Met house physician who attended Warren after his collapse, to have been a heart attack; Warren was only forty-eight years old. His death affected the Met schedule for several years following; he had been cast in the title role for a future Met premiere of Verdi's Nabucco during the 1960–61 season. Warren is interred at Saint Mary's Cemetery in Greenwich, Connecticut.

Ted Morgan, writing (as Sanche de Gramont) for the New York Herald Tribune, won the Pulitzer Prize for Local Reporting, Edition Time in 1961 for his account of Warren's death.
