= Audrey Schuh =

American soprano (1931–2023)

Audrey Clare Schuh (June 11, 1931 – October 28, 2023) was an American operatic soprano.

== Biography ==
Audrey Clare Schuh was born in New Orleans, Louisiana on June 11, 1931. She studied at Loyola University of the South.

Her first leading role with the New Orleans Opera Association (at the age of eighteen) was the page-boy Oscar in Un ballo in maschera, opposite Jussi Björling, in 1950. She starred there in Don Giovanni (as Zerlina), Carmen (as Micaëla), Amelia al ballo, Falstaff (as Nannetta), Die Fledermaus (as Roselinde von Eisenstein), Hänsel und Gretel (as Gretel), La bohème (as Musetta), La traviata, La bohème (as Mimì), Markheim (world premiere), Turandot (as Liù), Elektra (as Chrysothemis), Pagliacci, and Il tabarro.

Schuh also sang Nannetta in Falstaff for the San Francisco Opera. She sang with the Houston Grand Opera (Madama Butterfly), the New England Opera Theatre (La traviata and La rondine), the Jackson Opera Guild (Pagliacci, then Die Fledermaus with Virginia MacWatters) and the San Antonio Opera Guild (Markheim). In 1967, she appeared at the New York City Opera for a memorable season at its new theatre at Lincoln Center: La bohème (as Mimì), Madama Butterfly (directed by Frank Corsaro), and Suor Angelica (conducted by Julius Rudel). She made a return to the New Orleans Opera in 1977, again as Micaëla, which was her Farewell.

One of her sons, the tenor Kirk Redmann, appeared with the Metropolitan Opera from 1983 to 1990. From 1994 to 1999, VAI issued several of Schuh's New Orleans performances on Compact Discs.

Schuh died on October 28, 2023, at the age of 92.

== Discography ==
- Verdi: Un ballo in maschera (S.Morris, Björling, Rothmüller; Herbert, 1950) [live] VAI
- Verdi: Falstaff (della Chiesa, Warren; Cellini, 1956) [live] VAI
- Puccini: La bohème (Albanese, di Stefano, Valdengo, Treigle; Cellini, 1959) [live] VAI
- Floyd: Markheim (Treigle; Andersson, 1966) [live] VAI
- Puccini: Turandot: excerpts (Nilsson; Andersson, 1966) [live] VAI
- Strauss: Elektra (Borkh, Resnik, Crofoot, Rayson; Andersson, 1966) [live] VAI
