= Norman Treigle =

American bass-baritone (1927-1975)

Norman Treigle (né Adanelle Wilfred Treigle (March 6, 1927 – February 16, 1975) was an American operatic bass-baritone, who was acclaimed for his great abilities as a singing-actor, and specialized in roles that evoked villainy and terror.

== Biography ==
Treigle (/ˈtreɪɡəl/ TRAY-gəl) was born in New Orleans, the fifth and final child of a poor carpenter and his wife. Following his 1946 marriage to the former Loraine Siegel, the bass-baritone began vocal studies with the contralto Elisabeth Wood. In 1947, he made his operatic debut with the New Orleans Opera Association, as the Duke of Verona in Roméo et Juliette.

Between 1949 and 1951, he attended Loyola University of the South's College of Music, while performing various roles with the local opera company. (Loyola's archives now preserve Treigle's personal papers.)

In 1953, Treigle made his New York City Opera debut, as Colline in La bohème. Three years later, the bass-baritone scored his first significant success, as the tormented Reverend Olin Blitch, in the New York premiere of Floyd's Susannah. He made his European debut in this same opera, at the Brussels World's Fair, in 1958.

In succeeding seasons, Treigle became arguably the top bass-baritone of the Americas, and was acclaimed as one of the world's foremost singing-actors. He sang in many experimental productions and participated in several important premieres, in operas by Einem, Copland, Moore, Floyd, Orff, Dallapiccola and Ward (The Crucible). Perhaps his greatest roles were in Faust (as Méphistophélès), Carmen (as Escamillo), Susannah, Il prigioniero, Les contes d'Hoffmann (the four Villains), Boris Godunov and, especially, Mefistofele.

Strange Child of Chaos: Norman Treigle.

In the autumn of 1974, Treigle made his debut at Covent Garden in a new production of Faust. On February 16, 1975, Treigle was found dead in his New Orleans apartment. He had been diagnosed as a chronic insomniac, and it was determined that he had consumed an accidental overdose of sleeping pills. By his first wife (who died in 2013), he had a son (who died in 1993) and a daughter, Phyllis. He had also adopted the daughter of his second wife, from whom he was separated at the time of his death.

Phyllis Treigle is a soprano who appeared with the New Orleans Opera and the New York City Opera.

== Treigle Plaza ==
On October 12, 2012, Treigle Plaza was dedicated, in the presence of Phyllis Treigle and Audrey Schuh. It is the elevated area in front of the Mahalia Jackson Theater of the Performing Arts, in New Orleans, including the great fountain. The Dedication ceremony preceded a Gala Concert, by the New Orleans Opera, starring Plácido Domingo, with Patricia Clarkson as hostess.

== Trivia ==
- A fragment of the Treigle voice is heard in the 2005 Warner Bros. film, Batman Begins, directed by Christopher Nolan. The young Bruce Wayne and his parents are seen attending a performance of Mefistofele in Gotham City, and the recording used is EMI's 1973 set.

== Selected discography of studio recordings ==
- Copland: The Tender Land: abridged (Clements, Cassilly, Fredricks; Copland, 1965) Columbia Records
- Handel: Giulio Cesare (Sills, Forrester; Rudel, 1967) RCA Victor
- Floyd: Pilgrimage: excerpts (Torkanowsky, 1971) Orion
- Offenbach: Les contes d'Hoffmann (Sills, Marsee, Burrows; Rudel, 1972) Westminster (Deutsche Grammophon)
- Boito: Mefistofele (Caballé, Domingo; Rudel, 1973) EMI

== Selected approved "live" recordings ==
- Puccini: La bohème (Albanese, Schuh, di Stefano, Valdengo; Cellini, 1959) VAI
- Dallapiccola: Il prigioniero (McKnight, Cassilly; Stokowski, 1960) Opera Depot
- Floyd: Susannah (Curtin, Cassilly; Andersson, 1962) VAI
- Floyd: The Sojourner and Mollie Sinclair (Neway; Rudel, 1963) VAI
- Floyd: Markheim (Schuh, Crofoot; Andersson, 1966) VAI
- Handel: Giulio Cesare: excerpts (Sills; Richter, 1968) VAI
- Gounod: Faust (Sills, Costa-Greenspon, Molese, Cossa; Rudel, 1968) Opera Depot

== Commercial videography ==
- Floyd: Susannah: Revival Scene (Yestadt, Treigle, 1958) [live] Bel Canto Society
