= Grace Hoffman =

American mezzo-soprano (1921–2008)

- Born: Goldie Hoffman; January 14, 1921; Cleveland, Ohio, U.S.
- Died: July 26, 2008 (aged 87); Stuttgart, Germany
- Occupations: Operatic mezzo-soprano; Academic teacher
- Organization: Staatsoper Stuttgart
- Title: Kammersängerin
- Awards: Order of Merit of Baden-Württemberg

Grace Hoffman (born Goldie Hoffman; January 14, 1921 – July 26, 2008) was an American operatic mezzo-soprano and academic teacher. Based at the Staatsoper Stuttgart from 1955 to 1992, she performed roles such as Verdi's Azucena and Eboli at leading opera houses in Europe and the Americas. Her signature role was Wagner's Brangäne, performed at the Bayreuth Festival, among others.

== Life ==
Goldie Hoffman was born on January 14, 1921, in Cleveland, Ohio, to a family of Hungarian origin. She studied literature and musicology and received her first vocal training from Lila Robeso, then with Friedrich Schorr and Giuseppe Gentile as well as Mario Basiola in Rome.

In 1951 she won a singing competition in Lausanne. She made her debut in 1951 with the touring Wagner Opera Company as Lucia in Mascagni's Cavalleria rusticana. The same year, she appeared as the Priestess in Verdi's Aida at the Maggio Musicale Fiorentino. In 1952, she performed at the Zürich Opera House as Azucena in Verdi's Il trovatore and remained there until 1955. She then moved to the Staatsoper Stuttgart, where she was a member of the ensemble until 1992. She appeared as a guest at La Scala in Milan in 1955, in the role of Fricka in Wagner's Die Walküre, opposite Martha Mödl, Wolfgang Windgassen, and Hans Hotter. She returned to that theatre in 1974, for Herodias in Salome, with Dame Gwyneth Jones. The dramatic mezzo-soprano performed regularly at the Royal Opera House in London and the Vienna State Opera, where she sang from 1961 to 1990.

Hoffman performed at the Bavarian State Opera, the San Francisco Opera, the Teatro Colón in Buenos Aires, the Paris Opéra, the Deutsche Oper Berlin, the Deutsche Oper am Rhein, the Opéra national de Bordeaux, the Teatro Comunale Bologna, La Fenice in Venice, Teatro San Carlo in Naples, La Monnaie in Brussels, the Copenhagen Opera House, the Philadelphia Opera, and the Liceu in Barcelona.

In 1958, she had an engagement at the Metropolitan Opera in New York as Brangäne in Tristan und Isolde, with Ramón Vinay and Mödl. She returned to the Met in 1971, again in Tristan und Isolde, now opposite Jess Thomas, Birgit Nilsson, and John Macurdy, conducted by Erich Leinsdorf. In 1964, she sang Elisabetta in a concert version of Donizetti's Maria Stuarda at Carnegie Hall.

From 1957 to 1970, Hoffman performed at the Bayreuth Festival in her signature role as Brangäne in Tristan und Isolde (1957–59, 1966, 1968–70), as well as in Der Ring des Nibelungen as Siegrune (1958, 1960–64), Waltraute (1960–61, 1964, 1968–69), the Second Norn (1961–64) and Fricka (1962–64), in 1967–68 also as Ortrud in Lohengrin. A few months after the death of Wieland Wagner, Bayreuth toured his production to the Osaka International Festival, in 1967, of Die Walküre, when Hoffman portrayed Fricka with Anja Silja, Theo Adam, Helge Dernesch, and Thomas, conducted by Thomas Schippers. It was televised, though it has never been published commercially.

Hoffman was much appreciated in Buenos Aires. At the Teatro Colón she performed in seven seasons between 1960 and 1975, singing in ten different operas. Signature roles included Fricka in Die Walküre (1960 and 1967) and in Das Rheingold (1967), Brangäne in Tristan und Isolde (1963 and 1971, with Nilsson and Vickers), Herodias in Salome (1965 with Nilsson), and a colossal Nurse in Die Frau ohne Schatten (1965 and 1970). Hoffman also sang Dorabella in Così fan Tutte (1960), Kostelnička in Jenůfa (1963, in German), Waltraute and the Second Norn in Götterdämmerung (1967), and Klitämnestra in Elektra (1975).

Enzo Valenti Ferro, former Director General of the Teatro Colón, had this to say about Hoffman:

One of the finest mezzo-sopranos to sing German repertoire in the Teatro Colón over several seasons, Hoffman possessed great vocal and stage authority. A musical and cultivated singer with an excellent background in chamber music and concert performance, she possessed a beautiful, highly even voice with great tonal projection; she perfectly combined a flawless vocal line with expressive qualities that carried a distinctive chamber-music sensibility.

In 1978, Hoffman was appointed a professor at the State University of Music and Performing Arts Stuttgart but continued her singing career. In 1988, she appeared as Mother Wesener in Bernd Alois Zimmermann's Die Soldaten at the Opéra du Rhin, a role she again played at the Vienna State Opera in 1990. She recorded the part for Teldec in 1988–89, opposite Nancy Shade, conducted by Bernhard Kontarsky. In 1989, the production was filmed and published on video-cassette, then DVD.

Among her other recordings are Brangäne in excerpts from Tristan und Isolde with Birgit Nilsson, conducted by Hans Knappertsbusch in 1959 for Decca, Herodias in Salome, with Nilsson, led by Sir Georg Solti, for Decca in 1961; Amneris in excerpts from Aida, led by Sir John Pritchard, with Nilsson, Luigi Ottolini, and Louis Quilico, in 1963 for Decca; Gertrud in Hänsel und Gretel, conducted by André Cluytens, for EMI in 1963–64; and Messiah, led by Otto Klemperer, with Dame Elisabeth Schwarzkopf, Nicolai Gedda, and Jerome Hines, for EMI in 1965. Hoffman also recorded Mahler's Das Lied von der Erde in 1958 with Helmut Melchert conducted by Hans Rosbaud for Vox Records.

Hoffman was awarded the title Kammersängerin. She lived in Neckartailfingen near Stuttgart. She died of pancreatic cancer in the Marienhospital Stuttgart on July 26, 2008, at age 87. Her grave is in Cleveland.

== Honors ==
- Honorary member of the Stuttgart Opera
- Order of Merit of Baden-Württemberg (1978)
