= Quilico =

Quilico is a surname. Notable people with the surname include:

- Christina Petrowska-Quilico (born 1948), Canadian pianist
- Gino Quilico (born 1955), Canadian opera singer, 1996 Grammy for Best Opera Recording, son of Louis Quilico and Lina Pizzolongo
- Louis Quilico (1925–2000), Canadian baritone
