= William Cochran (tenor) =

American tenor (1943–2022)

William Cochran (23 June 1943 — 16 January 2022) was an American Heldentenor who achieved an international career.

== Life ==
Born in Columbus, Ohio, Cochran studied at the Curtis Institute of Music and with Martial Singher. He attended the Music Academy of the West in 1967 and 1968. A winner of the Lauritz Melchior Heldentenor Foundation Award, he debuted with the Metropolitan Opera as Vogelgesang in Wagner's Die Meistersinger, in 1968. The following year, he appeared as Froh in Wagner's Das Rheingold with the San Francisco Opera.

In 1974, Cochran first sang at Covent Garden, as Laca in Janáček's Jenůfa, conducted by Sir Charles Mackerras. In 1975, he performed the title role of Wagner's Lohengrin at the New Orleans Opera, and, in 1977, sang in Janáček's Katya Kabanova at San Francisco, alongside Elisabeth Söderström, Chester Ludgin and Susanne Marsee. He returned to that company in 1997, for Herod in Salome by Richard Strauss. For the Opera Company of Boston, the tenor appeared in Zimmermann's Die Soldaten as Desportes in 1982 and in Janáček's The Makropoulos Case in 1986, both conducted and directed by Sarah Caldwell.

Cochran returned to the Met as Bacchus in Ariadne auf Naxos by Richard Strauss, with Jessye Norman in the title role, in 1984. The singing-actor was a member of the Oper Frankfurt for several years. He appeared at the Bavarian State Opera in Munich as Laca, Svatopluk Cech in Janáček's The Excursions of Mr. Brouček to the Moon and to the 15th Century, the Elector in Henze's Der Prinz von Homburg, as Wagner's Siegfried, and Aegisth in Elektra by Richard Strauss. He also sang at the Hamburg State Opera and the Vienna State Opera, among others. His roles also include operas such as Mozart's Idomeneo, Cherubini's Médée (with Anja Silja in the title role), Les Troyens by Berlioz, Meyerbeer's La juive, Verdi's Otello, Leoncavallo's Pagliacci, Mussorgsky's Boris Godunov (as Grigori), Busoni's Doktor Faust, Shostakovitch's Lady Macbeth of the Mtsensk District, and Stravinsky's The Rake's Progress. He retired from the stage in 2001.

His discography includes Act I of Die Walküre (as Siegmund with Helga Dernesch as Sieglinde, conducted by Otto Klemperer, 1969–70), Doktor Faust (as Mephistopheles, with Dietrich Fischer-Dieskau, 1969), Mahler's Eighth Symphony (conducted by Bernard Haitink, 1971), Hindemith's Mathis der Maler (as Schwalb, with Fischer-Dieskau and James King, conducted by Rafael Kubelík, 1979), and Die Soldaten (with Nancy Shade, 1988–89).

== Videography ==
- Zimmermann: Die Soldaten (N. Shade; Kontarsky, Kupfer, 1989) [live] Kultur

== Sources ==
- The Concise Oxford Dictionary of Opera, Oxford University Press, 1996. ISBN 0-19-280028-0
