= Carol Ann Weaver =

Canadian composer

Carol Ann Weaver (born May 6, 1948) is an American-Canadian composer, pianist, and teacher.

== Biography ==
Weaver was born in Harrisonburg, Virginia, to a Mennonite family. At the time of her birth, her parents belonged to a Mennonite church that banned musical instruments in members' homes. Fortunately, the ban was lifted during Weaver's childhood, and her family immediately got a piano. She attended Indiana University (Bloomington), where she earned a B.M. (1970), M.M. (1972), and D.M.A. in composition (1982). During the summer of 1974, she studied theory and composition at the University of Michigan (Ann Arbor). Weaver studied composition with John Eaton, Bernard Heiden, Juan Orrego-Salas, and Higo Hirado; piano with Gyorgy Sebok, Robert Weisz, and Enrica Cavallo Gulli; and theory with Mary Wennerstrom, Vernon Kliewer, and Elaine Barkin.

Currently a Professor Emerita at Conrad Grebel University College/University of Waterloo, Weaver also taught music at Wilfrid Laurier University, Canadian Mennonite University (formerly Concord College), Indiana University, and Eastern Mennonite University. Her Sound in the Land Festival Conferences at the University of Waterloo have brought together composers, performers, and scholars from all over the world. Weaver has toured internationally as a pianist with vocalist Rebecca Campbell. She plays keyboards with mandolinist Lyle Friesen in the duo Mooncoin.

== Awards and publications ==
Weaver won a Virginia Music Teachers Society piano competition in 1966. She has performed as a solo pianist in recitals at Eastern Mennonite University, Ohio State University, and Bridgewater College (Virginia). Her music has been heard on CBC radio and TV, SABC, Korean National TV, and other Canadian, American, and European radio stations. Weaver is chair of the Association of Canadian Women Composers and secretary of the Canadian Association of Sound Ecology. She is a member of the Canadian Music Centre and the Society of Composers, Authors and Music Publishers of Canada (SOCAN). She has written numerous articles, and written or edited several books:

- Departure and Return (illustrated by Gloria Kagawa; 2014)
- Sound in the Land: Essays on Mennonites and Music (2006)
- Sound in the Land: Music and the Environment (2015)
- Sound in the Lands: Mennonite Music Across Borders (2011)

Weaver has received grants or commissions from:

- Ardeleana Trio
- Arraymusic
- Bass Impact (bass clarinet duo)
- Blue Rider Ensemble
- Canada Arts Council
- Cincinnati Arts Festival
- Fifth Stream Festival
- Gallery Players
- Goshen College (Indiana)
- Hemispheres Orchestra
- Indi 85 Dance Festival (Toronto)
- Laidlaw Foundation
- Manitoba Arts Council
- Mary Petrich (saxophonist)
- Music at Sharon
- Ontario Arts Council
- University of Waterloo Orchestra
- University of Waterloo Trickster Festival
- Wider Boundary of Daring Conference (Windsor)

She has composed many works for chamber ensembles, piano, and voice. Her major compositions include:

- Earth Peace: Missa Brevis for Peace (soprano, chorus, string quartet, percussion; 2016)

== Dance ==
- Early and Late Garden (choreography by Louise Azzerello; 1989)
- In Flight (choreography by Paula Ravitz; 1987)
- Pumps 'n Power (choreography by Conrad Alexandrowicz; 1985)

== Electronic ==
- Afterday (multimedia)
- "Beyond Soundless Stars" (piano and tape; 1973)
- Dawn Chorus (chorus with string orchestra and Georgia Bay soundscape; 2017)
- Earth Voices (multimedia; text by various Mennonite writers)
- "Erscheinen" (tape; 1972)
- Gathering (chorus, electric guitar, percussion, amplified piano; 1975)
- "Mini-moog-scape" (mini-moog; 1970)
- Rejoice (chorus, electric guitar, orchestra; 1980)
- Sing Praises (speakers and tape; 1976)
- Tower of Babel (a cappella chorus, electric guitar, percussion, amplified piano; 1972)

== Orchestra ==
- Blessing (soprano saxophone and string orchestra; 2012)
- Fourteen Women/Quatorze Femmes (1990)
- Georgian Bay (chorus and string orchestra; 2017)
- Glimpses (string sextet and orchestra; 1976)
- Kgalagadi Calls (2011)
- Mass (chorus and orchestra; 1976)
- Orogeny (1974)
- Parry Soundings (string orchestra; 2017)
- Rejoice (chorus, orchestra, four readers; 1980)
- Water (2007)
- West Wind (chorus and string orchestra; 2017)

== Discography ==
Weaver has released eight CDs:

- Daughter of Olapa (1996)
- Journey Begun (1999)
- Dancing Rivers: From South Africa to Canada (2001)
- Awakenings (with Rebecca Campbell; 2003)
- Thistle and Jewel (2006)
- Every Three Children (2007)
- Paraguay Primeval (2012)
- Songs for My Mother (2018)
