= Die Soldaten =

Opera by Bernd Alois Zimmermann

- Opera by Bernd Alois Zimmermann
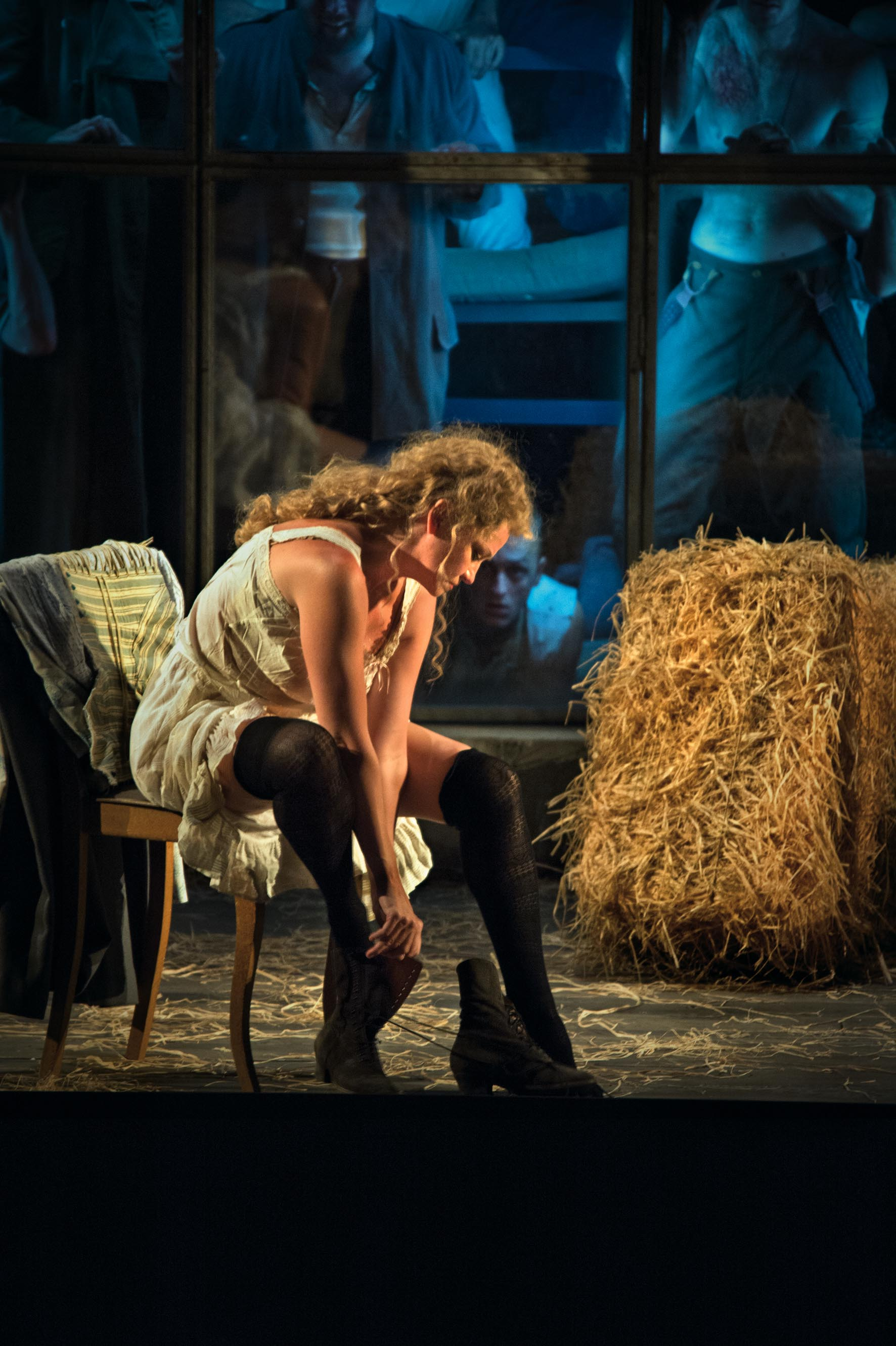
- Laura Aikin as Marie at the Salzburg Festival 2012
- Translation: The Soldiers
- Librettist: Jakob Michael Reinhold Lenz
- Language: German
- Based on: Die Soldaten by J. M. R. Lenz
- Premiere: 15 February 1965; Cologne Opera

Die Soldaten (The Soldiers) is a four-act opera in German by Bernd Alois Zimmermann, based on the 1776 play by Jakob Michael Reinhold Lenz. In a letter accompanying his newly printed play (23 July 1776, aged 24), Lenz described himself to his best friend, the German philosopher Johann Gottfried von Herder, as "an enigma to even his most precious friends", while saying of the play, "Here, into your holy hands, the piece which carries half of my existence. [The ideas it contains are] true and will remain so, even if centuries may walk contemptuously across my skull".

Zimmermann wrote and revised his opera in phases between 1957 and 1964; it was premiered in 1965 and dedicated to Hans Rosbaud. Zimmermann himself faithfully adapted the play into the libretto, the only changes to the text being repeats and small cuts. It is the composer's only completed opera and is considered an important work of the second half of the 20th century.

== Composition ==
Die Soldaten came about as a result of a commission from the Cologne Opera, and Zimmermann began the work in 1957.

His original idea was to present the opera on twelve stages surrounding the audience, who would be seated on swiveling chairs. Upon reviewing an early scored version of this idea, however, the Cologne officials, including Wolfgang Sawallisch, advised Zimmermann that it would be impossible to realize ("unaufführbar").

In 1963 Zimmermann completed a Vokal-Sinfonie using music for the opera consistent with the original idea, to demonstrate in concert that the music could in fact be played. He did not, however, go on to complete a version of the opera consistent with the original idea, as presented in draft form to Sawallisch and the other officials, according to his widow. Instead, from 1963 to 1964, during a study visit to the Villa Massimo in Rome, Zimmermann revised his composition into the version we know today in order to get it performed. The premiere followed the next year.

== Performance history ==
WDR (Westdeutscher Rundfunk) broadcast scenes from Die Soldaten in 1963, but the first staged performance, with Cologne Opera forces conducted by Michael Gielen, did not take place until 15 February 1965, after Zimmermann completed revisions to the score in 1964. WDR documented this with a recording, made in sessions on 21 and 22 February and 2 and 3 March in its main studio. In 1969 Gielen also conducted the successful and widely reviewed Bavarian State Opera premiere run in Munich.

The first British performance came during the 1972 Edinburgh Festival, when the Deutsche Oper am Rhein company took a 1971 Düsseldorf production to the King's Theatre. The opera did not reach London until November 1996, in a staging by English National Opera with Jon Garrison as Desportes. The U.S. premiere was on 7 February 1982 by the Opera Company of Boston led by Sarah Caldwell with Phyllis Hunter as Marie, Beverly Morgan as her sister Charlotte, William Cochran as Desportes, and Joaquin Romaguera as Captain Pirzel. Die Soldaten arrived in New York in 1991 in a production by New York City Opera under Christopher Keene's baton.

In 1988 and 1989 Bernhard Kontarsky conducted Stuttgart performances and recording sessions of the complete opera, with Nancy Shade as Marie. These resulted in a Teldec CD set and, much later, an Arthaus DVD.

Dresden's Semperoper gave the opera for the first time in 1995 in a celebrated primary-color staging by Willy Decker. The Japan premiere, which took place at the New National Theatre Tokyo in May 2008, conducted by Hiroshi Wakasugi the year before he died, used this Decker staging; Wakasugi had served as a permanent conductor of the Semperoper from 1982 to 1991 and had recorded Zimmermann's original (1963) Vokal-Sinfonie "Die Soldaten" für 6 Gesangs-Solisten und Orchester with WDR forces, in London, in 1978.

The opera was given an acclaimed "warehouse" production at Germany's Ruhrtriennale festival in Bochum in 2006, with David Pountney directing and Steven Sloane conducting. This was filmed and released as a DVD and in 2008 successfully mounted in New York at the Park Avenue Armory as part of the Lincoln Center Festival.

Die Soldaten was first performed at the Salzburg Festival on 20 August 2012, with the Vienna Philharmonic conducted by Ingo Metzmacher. A year later it was staged by Calixto Bieito at Zürich Opera; Marc Albrecht conducted, with Susanne Elmark as Marie and Peter Hoare reprised the role of Desportes he had sung in Bochum, Tokyo and New York. The same production went to the Komische Oper in Berlin in 2014, always with Susanne Elmark in the role of Marie, Gabriel Feltz conducted.

On 25 May 2014 the opera returned to the Bavarian State Opera in Munich in an Andreas Kriegenburg staging conducted by Kirill Petrenko with Barbara Hannigan in the role of Marie. This was streamed live over the Internet on 31 May 2014.

The Latin American premiere was in July 2016, with critical acclaim, in a new production by Teatro Colón, conducted by Baldur Brönnimann and directed by Pablo Maritano. Its fifth and last performance was live-streamed, with Susanne Elmark in the role of Marie.

Susanne Elmark is actually now the singer that has sung Marie the most, particularly in March 2018 in Nuremberg Opera, staged by Peter Konwitschny and in May 2018 in Teatro Real of Madrid, in the reprise of Calixto Bieito staging, Pablo Heras-Casado conducted. The centenary of Zimmermann has been celebrated also in Cologne with a production created by Carlus Padrissa (La Fura dels Baus) in April 2018.

== Roles ==
Role	Voice type	Premiere cast, 15 February 1965 Conductor: Michael Gielen
Wesener, a goods merchant in Lille	bass	Zoltán Kelemen
Marie, his daughter	soprano	Edith Gabry
Charlotte, his daughter	mezzo-soprano	Helga Jenckel
Wesener's Old Mother	contralto	Maura Moreira
Stolzius, a mercer in Armentières	baritone	Claudio Nicolai
Stolzius's Mother	contralto	Elisabeth Schärtel
Obrist (Colonel), Graf (Count) von Spannheim	bass	Erich Winckelmann
Desportes, a French nobleman	tenor	Anton de Ridder
Captain Haudy	baritone	Gerd Nienstedt
Captain Mary	baritone	Camillo Meghor
Captain Pirzel	high tenor	Albert Weikenmeier
Padre Eisenhardt, a military chaplain	baritone	Heiner Horn
Three young officers	tenors	Norman Paige, Hubert Möhler, Heribert Steinbach
Gräfin (Countess) de la Roche	mezzo-soprano	Liane Synek
Gräfin de la Roche's Son (Young Count)	tenor	Willi Brokmeier
Gräfin de la Roche's Servant	sprechgesang	
Desportes's Young Gamekeeper	sprechgesang	
Andalusian Waitress	dancer	
Madame Roux, coffee-house owner	mute role	
Civil servants, officers, captains	mute roles	
18 officers and ensigns	sprechgesang and percussion	

== Synopsis ==
Place: Lille and nearby Armentières in French Flanders. Time: (Zimmermann) "Yesterday, today, and tomorrow."

=== Act 1 ===
Preludio

Scene 1 (Strophe): Marie has moved from Armentières to Lille with her father Wesener, a fancy goods merchant. She writes a letter to the mother of her fiancé, Stolzius, a young draper in Armentières, while her sister Charlotte does needlework. Charlotte's aria: Herz, kleines Ding, uns zu quälen. An argument breaks out between the sisters, Charlotte being scornful of Marie's love for Stolzius.

Scene 2 (Ciacona I): Stolzius has been lovesick since Marie's departure for Lille, but he is encouraged when his mother brings him a letter.

Scene 3 (Ricercari I): Desportes is a French-serving nobleman from Hainaut, and one of Wesener's customers. He courts the commoner Marie and wins her affection. Her father, however, forbids her to go with him to the theatre: for a commoner to accompany an officer in public would damage the family name.

Scene 4 (Toccata I): At the trenches in Armentières, officers discuss with Padre Eisenhardt the relative merits of comedy. Captain Haudy, one of the officers, holds the view that it has more value than a sermon. Eisenhardt maintains that comedy undermines the soldiers' sense of what is right – their loose morals have already brought misery to countless young women. Haudy counters with the argument, "once a whore, always a whore". No, replies Eisenhardt, a whore would never be a whore if she were not forced to become one.

Scene 5 (Nocturno I): Wesener advises his daughter to be cautious in her dealings with Desportes, although he secretly harbours the hope that she may marry the young aristocrat. In the meantime, he says, it would not be wise to give up Stolzius altogether. As stormclouds gather, Marie grows anxious at what lies ahead and the dilemma builds in her heart.

=== Act 2 ===
Scene 1 (Toccata II): The officers discuss politics and Stolzius, and philosophize, at the Armentières café, owned by Madame Roux. When the Colonel and Eisenhardt leave, a jazzy dance begins (Rondeau à la marche), led by the Andalusian waitress: O Angst! Tausendfach Leben ... Götter wir sind! After five couplets, this screeches to a halt upon the return of the Colonel and Eisenhardt with Haudy. Stolzius arrives, and the officers make insinuating remarks about Marie's relationship with Desportes. Tumult.

Intermezzo

Scene 2 (Capriccio, Corale e Ciacona II): Marie has received a reproachful letter from Stolzius. She is reading it in tears when Desportes enters. He scornfully dictates to her a brusque reply. His flattery finally has the desired effect: his spot with Marie is won. In the room next door, Wesener's aged mother sings the folk song Rösel aus Hennegay with its prophetic line, Some day your cross will come to you. On a partitioned stage appear, on one side, Marie and Desportes as a couple engrossed in love play, and on the other, Stolzius and his mother, who is trying to convince her son that having broken off his engagement, the "soldier's whore" Marie was not worthy of him. But Stolzius defends her and swears revenge on Desportes.

=== Act 3 ===
Scene 1 (Rondino): A conversation between Eisenhardt and Captain Pirzel, whose odd behaviour is portrayed as the result of the monotony of military service, reveals that Captain Mary, a friend of Desportes, is to be transferred from Armentières to Lille.

Scene 2 (Rappresentazione): In order to move closer to Marie, Stolzius offers Captain Mary his services as a batman.

Scene 3 (Ricercari II): Desportes has left Marie. When she starts accepting gifts from Captain Mary, her sister Charlotte labels her a "soldier's girl". Marie claims she only behaved in this way in order to get news of Desportes. Captain Mary invites Marie and Charlotte for a drive; neither of them recognizes the identity of his batman Stolzius.

Romanza (Act 3 Zwischenspiel)

Scene 4 (Nocturno II): Gräfin de la Roche reproaches her son, the Young Count, for his behaviour toward Marie. She advises him to leave town and, in order to protect Marie from the advances of other officers, she declares herself willing to take the girl into her own house as a companion.

Scene 5 (Tropi): The Gräfin goes to find Marie at Wesener's house. In Charlotte's presence, she makes her offer, persuading Marie it is the only way she can now save her honour. Trio: Ach, ihr Wünsche junger Jahre.

=== Act 4 ===
Scene 1 (Toccata III): What the future holds in store for Marie is a living nightmare. Films I, II and III. Having turned down the Gräfin's offer in order to try to renew her contact with Desportes, she is now subjected by Desportes to the attentions of his young gamekeeper, who makes a brutal sexual assault. Dishonored and discredited, Marie wanders aimlessly while the Gräfin, the Young Count, Wesener, Charlotte, Pirzel, and Eisenhardt all search for her.

Scene 2 (Ciacona III): Captain Mary and Desportes are eating their evening meal. Stolzius, who is serving them, overhears their conversation and learns of Marie's fate. He hands Desportes a bowl of poisoned soup and, before drinking some of the soup himself, triumphantly reveals his identity to the dying Desportes. Stolzius dies.

Scene 3 (Nocturno III): As Eisenhardt sings the Pater noster, Marie, now sunk to the level of a street beggar, encounters her father and asks him for alms. Wesener does not recognize her, but, out of concern for his daughter, gives her money. He then joins an endless procession of enslaved and fallen soldiers, in which the drunken officers also take part. The procession builds to a vision of Hell: one human is raped by another, the individual by the collective conscience and, in this instance, by the power of the army.

== Staging and instrumentation ==
Even today, a stage performance of Die Soldaten places demands on any opera company. In addition to the sixteen singing and ten speaking roles, it requires a one-hundred-piece orchestra involving many instruments and pieces of percussion. With its open action, a number of scenes which at times overlap one another or run simultaneously (the second scene of act 2, for example, or all of act 4), its multimedia structure incorporating film screens, projectors, tape recordings and loudspeakers, in addition to the sound effects of marching, engines and screams, Die Soldaten – an opera composed using the strict rules of twelve-tone music and presenting a degree of complexity despite its design for the stage – is a complicated opera, both to stage and to watch.

There are numerous unorthodox roles in this opera, but the most noticeable is the mass usage of banging chairs and tables on the stage floor as percussion instruments. This is carried out by many of the actors with non-singing roles. The composer also calls for 3 cinema screens, 3 film projectors and groups of loudspeakers on the stage and in the auditorium.

The orchestra is composed of:

Woodwinds

4 flutes (all 4 doubling on piccolos with flute 3 also doubling on alto flute in G)
3 oboes (doubling also on oboe d'amore with oboe 3 also doubling on cor anglais)
4 clarinets in B♭ (1, 2 & 4 doubling on clarinets in A with clarinet 3 also doubling bass clarinet and clarinet 4 also doubling E♭ clarinet)
3 bassoons (2 & 3 doubling contrabassoon)
1 alto saxophone in E♭

Brass

5 horns in F (all horns are also doubling on tenor tubas in B♭, Horn 5 additionally doubling on bass tuba in F)
4 trumpets in C (1 & 2 doubling trumpets in B♭ & F and 3 & 4 doubling trumpets in B♭ & A as well as bass trumpet in E♭)
4 trombones (trombone 4 doubling contrabass trombone)
1 bass tuba (also contrabass tuba)

Percussion (9–10 players)

1 player: timpani (also small timpano)

8–9 players:

3 crotales (E♭, F & G)
3 crotales (high, medium & low)
3 suspended cymbals (different sizes)
1 hihat
3 mounted cymbals (different sizes)
4 gongs
4 tamtams
1 tambourine
3 bongos (different sizes)
5 tomtoms (different sizes)
1 tumba (conga drum)
1 military drum
4 side drums
1 rumble pot (friction drum)
3 tenor drums
2 bass drums (one of them horizontal)
5 triangles (different sizes)
hand-held cowbell
4 mounted cowbells
1 set of steel sticks
2 tubular bells
3 suspended iron bars
1 whip
1 set of castanets
1 set of claves
2 wooden lids
3 wooden drums (different sizes)
1 güiro
1 pair of maracas
1 shaker
1 xylophone
1 marimba
1 vibraphone
1 glockenspiel

Keyboards

1 celesta
1 harpsichord
1 piano
1 organ (2 players)

Strings

1 guitar
2 harps

14 violin I's
12 violin II's
10 violas
10 cellos
8 double basses

On the stage:

The stage players consist of 3 percussionists and a 4-player jazz-band.

1. 3 triangles (high register), 3 crotales (high), 2 basins (high), gong (small), tamtam (small), small drum, military drum, 2 bongos, agitating drum, large drum (with cymbals), 3 bass drums, cow bell (high), 2 tube bells, maracas and temple block (high).
2. 3 triangles (middle register), 3 crotales (middle), 2 basins (middle), 2 gongs (medium & large), small drum, 2 Tomtoms, agitating drum, 3 bass drums, cow bell, 6 tube bells, maracas & temple block (middle).
3. 3 triangles (deep register), 1 crotale (deep), 2 basins (deep), gong (large), 2 tamtams (small & large), small drum, tomtom (deep), snare drum, 3 bass drums, cow bell (deep), 4 tube bells, maracas, 3 temple blocks (deep)

Jazz band:

- clarinet in B♭
- trumpet in B♭
- jazz guitar (electrically amplified)
- double bass (electrically amplified)

== Music ==
The prelude is written to sound as mechanical as possible, with dissonant combinations of instruments colliding against each other rhythmically to portray the mechanised movements of the soldiers on stage. As with Alban Berg's operas Wozzeck and Lulu, the individual scenes are built on strict musical forms; strophes, chaconnes, ricercare, toccatas, etc. Musically, the work makes extensive use of twelve-tone technique, and expresses debts to Berg's Wozzeck, such as in the shared name of the principal female role (Marie) and in the number of scenes (15).

Just as Zimmermann allows temporal levels to flow into one another, he also makes use of musical styles from several periods. Jazz rhythms (as in the coffee house scene), J. S. Bach chorales (from the St Matthew Passion), a folksong and the Dies irae plainchant sequence are juxtaposed and assembled in a way which creates a score which seethes with tension.

== Recordings ==
- Bernhard Kontarsky, conductor: Nancy Shade, Mark Munkittrick, Milagro Vargas, Grace Hoffman, Michael Ebbecke, Elsie Maurer, William Cochran, Alois Treml, Gregor Brodocz, Guy Renard, Karl-Friedrich Dürr, Klaus Hirte, Raymond Wolansky, Ursula Koszut, Jerrold van der Schaaf, Johannes Eidloth, Robert Wörle, Helmut Holzapfel; Staatsoper Stuttgart Chorus, Staatsorchester Stuttgart; Harry Kupfer, director. CD: 1988–1989 (Teldec), WARNER classics 2011, DVD: 1989 (Arthaus).
- Steven Sloane, conductor; Claudia Barainsky, Claudio Otelli, Frode Olsen, Katharina Peetz, Hanna Schwarz, Kathryn Harries, Andreas Becker, Peter Hoare, Robert Wörle, Jochen Schmeckenbecher, Adrian Clarke, Robert Bork, Michael Smallwood, Christopher Lemmings, Bernhard Berchtold, Helen Field, Adrian Thompson; Bochumer Symphoniker; David Pountney, director; Robert Innes Hopkins, stage design; DVD of the live performance of the production which premiered on 5 October 2006 at the RuhrTriennale, staged at the Jahrhunderthalle, Bochum.
- Michael Gielen, Conductor: Edith Gabry, Claudio Nicolai, Anton De Ridder Etc.; Staatsoper Stuttgart Chorus, Gurzenich-Orchester Koeln; CD: 2008 (Wergo).
- Ingo Metzmacher, conductor; Laura Aikin, Alfred Muff, Boaz Daniel, Tanja Ariane Baumgartner, Cornelia Kallisch, Tomasz Konieczny; Vienna Philharmonic; Alvis Hermanis, director; Unitel 2072584 Blu-ray of the live performance of the production in August 2012 at the Salzburger Festspiele, Salzburg.
- Kirill Petrenko, Conductor:Christoph Stephinger, Barbara Hannigan, Okka Von Der Damerau etc.; Bayerischen Staatsoper Munchen; TV: 2014.
