= Louis Quilico =

Canadian opera singer (1925–2000)

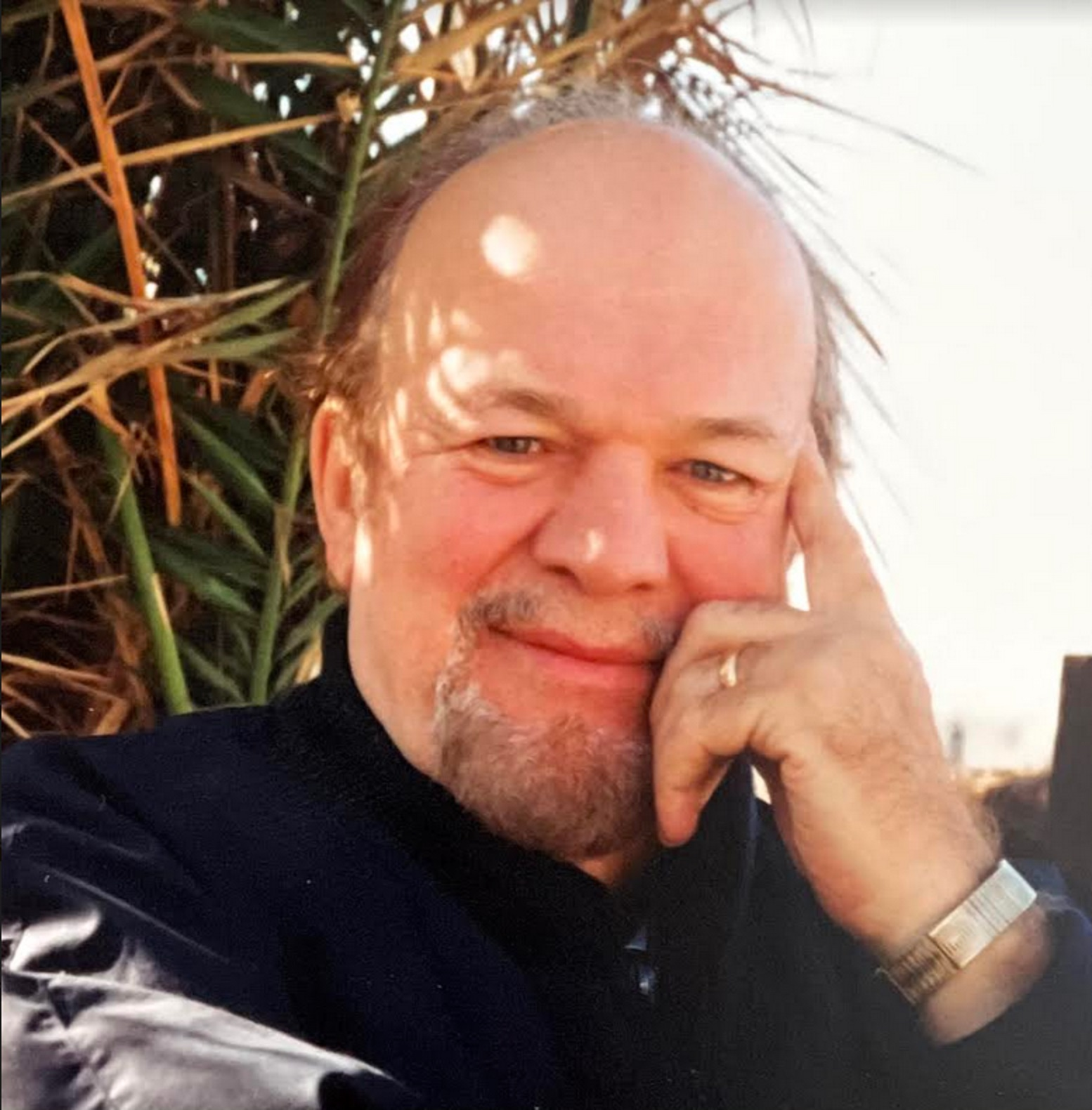
- Quilico in 1994

Background information
- Born: January 14, 1925; Montreal, Quebec, Canada
- Died: July 15, 2000 (aged 75) Toronto, Ontario, Canada

Louis Quilico, CC (January 14, 1925 – July 15, 2000) was a Canadian opera singer. One of the leading dramatic baritones of his day, he was an ideal interpreter of the great Italian and French composers, especially Giuseppe Verdi. He was often referred to as "Mr Rigoletto" in reference to the Verdi opera. During his 45-year-long career he shared performing credits with opera's greatest stars. He spent 25 consecutive years at the Metropolitan Opera in New York City. After his retirement from the stage in 1998 he continued to perform and record, most often with his second wife, pianist Christina Petrowska Quilico, with whom he made four CDs. The couple also toured together extensively in concerts until Quilico's death in 2000. Quilico received the Governor General's Performing Arts Award, Canada's highest honour in the performing arts, in November 1999 for his lifetime contribution to classical music.

== Biography ==
Louis Quilico was born in Montreal, Quebec, of an Italian father and a French-Canadian mother. He studied singing as a youth with Frank H. Rowe in his native Montreal while singing as a solo chorister in a church choir. After winning a prize in 1947, at the urging of the pianist and vocal coach Lina Pizzolongo, he continued his studies in Italy, studying at the Accademia Nazionale di Santa Cecilia in Rome with Teresa Pediconi and baritone Riccardo Stracciari. With the aid of a scholarship he also studied at Mannes College, New York, with Martial Singher (voice), Ralph Herbert (staging) and Emil Cooper (repertoire), and at the Conservatoire de musique du Québec à Montréal where he worked with Singher.

Quilico won the Nos futures étoiles competition on CBC Radio in 1953. He made his professional debut in 1954 as Rangoni in Boris Godunov with the Opera Guild of Montréal. He won the Metropolitan Opera Auditions of the Air in 1955 and made his New York debut with the New York City Opera, singing Germont in La traviata on October 10, 1955. Years later, in 1970, he sang the role of Nottingham in the Tito Capobianco production of Roberto Devereux opposite Beverly Sills, Plácido Domingo and Susanne Marsee.

On the international scene, Quilico made his debut in 1959 at the Spoleto Festival in the title role of Donizetti's "Il duca d'Alba." He made his debut at Covent Garden in London in La traviata opposite Dame Joan Sutherland in 1960, and remained a member of that company until 1963. He sang Rigoletto in his debut at the Bolshoi Theatre in Moscow, in 1962. In 1963 Quilico made his Paris Opéra debut as Rodrigue in Don Carlos. He was a member of the cast for the premiere of the opera La Mère coupable by Milhaud, in Geneva in 1966. He also appeared regularly at the Vienna State Opera and the Teatro Colón in Buenos Aires.

In Canada, Quilico performed regularly with the Canadian Opera Company in Toronto, debut as Iago in Otello in 1960; later roles were Rigoletto, Macbeth, Simon Boccanegra, Germont, Amonasro in Aïda, Scarpia in Tosca, Enrico in Lucia di Lammermoor, etc. He also made several appearances on CBC notably as Macbeth (opposite Marisa Galvany) in 1973. Quilico also sang at the Stratford Festival, the Vancouver Opera, and the Opéra du Québec. He sang his last Rigoletto at the Opéra de Montréal in 1991.

Throughout the 1970s he performed in various centres in the United States, including San Francisco (Luisa Miller), Philadelphia (I puritani), New Orleans (Manon), Baltimore (Tosca). He participated in concert version of rare operas with the American Opera Company with Eve Queler at Carnegie Hall, notably Gemma di Vergy and Parisina d'Este opposite Montserrat Caballé. In 1972 he sang the title role in the Opera Orchestra of New York's concert performance of Gioachino Rossini's William Tell with Klara Barlow as Mathilde. Quilico reached the Metropolitan Opera in February 1972 when he replaced at short notice the scheduled Golaud (Thomas Stewart) in Pelléas et Mélisande. His official debut there took place on January 1, 1973, as Germont. In 1987, Quilico appeared in Manon opposite his son Gino Quilico, also a baritone, a performance notable for being the first of a father and son in the same opera at the Met.

During the Met's 1976 season, he debuted the role of the Bishop of Blois in their premiere of Massenet's Esclarmonde, repeating his earlier commercial recording of the same role from a year earlier.

Quilico was also active as a teacher. He taught at the Faculty of Music of the University of Toronto, 1970–1987, at the McGill University in Montréal, 1987–1990, at Philadelphia's prestigious Academy of Vocal Arts, 1995–2000, and the Glenn Gould School, Toronto. In 2000 his widow Christina Petrowska Quilico created the Christina & Louis Awards Fund at the Ontario Arts Council which gives awards to emerging young singers. One of his pupils was bass John Dodington.

With his wife, pianist Christina Petrowska-Quilico, he embarked on a new phase of his career. The couple toured extensively in duo concerts and collaborated on his biography, Mr. Rigoletto: In Conversation with Louis Quilico and filmed a teaching video for York University. Quilico also continued his solo operatic career, performing Rigoletto for the last time in Ottawa in September 1994 with Opera Lyra (his 510th performance of the role). Quilico's appearances at the Metropolitan Opera during the 1990s included several of Pagliacci as well as Rigoletto, Tosca and Adriana Lecouvreur. He celebrated his 25th year at the Metropolitan Opera in 1996–97, and retired from that company in 1998. Analekta issued the Compact Disc entitled Mr. Rigoletto: My Life in Music (with pianist Christina Quilico) to commemorate the baritone's 75th birthday, and Captus Press released the 2nd edition of Mr. Rigoletto: In Conversation with Louis Quilico in 1998.

== Personal life ==
Louis Quilico was married to Christina Petrowska Quilico, concert pianist and Professor of Piano Performance and Musicology, author and artist, as well as step-father to two daughters, Dominique and Delphine. Lina Pizzolongo, pianist and vocal coach,(1925–1991) was his first wife. She was the mother of his son Gino Quilico and daughter Donna Quilico. Louis Quilico died on July 15, 2000, in Toronto, Ontario.

== Discography ==
- Donizetti, Il Duca d'Alba, conducted by Thomas Schippers, 1959
- Verdi, Aida (excerpts), with Birgit Nilsson, Grace Hoffman, Luigi Ottolini, conducted by Sir John Pritchard, 1963.
- Donizetti, Maria Stuarda, with Sills, Eileen Farrell, Stuart Burrows, conducted by Aldo Ceccato, 1971.
- Bellini, I puritani, with Sills, Nicolai Gedda, Paul Plishka, conducted by Julius Rudel, 1973.
- Massenet, Thérèse, with Huguette Tourangeau, conducted by Richard Bonynge, 1974.
- Massenet, Esclarmonde, with Sutherland, Giacomo Aragall, Tourangeau, conducted by Bonynge, 1975.
- Two of a Kind, with Christina Petrowska Quilico, piano, 1996.
- Chants Français et Russes with Christina Petrowska Quilico, piano, 1998.
- Vocal Gems - Live from New York (live from New York), with Christina Petrowska Quilico, piano, 2003.
- Mr. Rigoletto: My Life in Music, with Christina Petrowska Quilico, piano, and various orchestras, 2000.
- The Most Happy Fella by Frank Loesser, with Nancy Shade, 1997–99.
