= Association of Canadian Women Composers =

- Association des femmes compositeurs canadiennes
- Abbreviation: ACWC/AFCC
- Formation: November 2, 1980; 46 years ago
- Legal status: active
- Purpose: supports educational activities promoting the history of music by women in Canada
- Headquarters: Toronto, Ontario
- Region served: Canada
- Official language: English; French
- Website: Canadian Association of Broadcasters' website

The Association of Canadian Women Composers (ACWC) (French: Association des femmes compositeurs canadiennes [AFCC]) is a not-for-profit organization that aims to promote the performance of works by women composers, to disseminate information about and to women composers in Canada and abroad, to encourage women composers to realize their creative potential, and to foster the highest standard of composition. Its membership categories include active, affiliate, associate, and composer-in-training.

The association fonds were accumulated from members of the Association of Canadian Women Composers between 1988 and 2011. The records were held by the ACWC Archivist until 2011, when they were donated to The Banff Centre Archives. The fonds consists of records generated by the association, including the Association's formation and its subsequent activities. Records concern the administration of the Association itself, public activities and initiatives intended to provide support for Canadian women composers.

== History ==
The association was founded in 1980 by Carolyn Lomax (writer and broadcaster), Ann Southam, Mary Gardiner, and Maggie Burstyn. It was founded with a mandate to help fund and support emerging female performers and composers in order to address the lack of recognition for women composers in Canada. In 2002 Ann Southam, Mary Gardiner, Rhené Jaque, and Anita Sleeman became Honorary Life Members of the ACWC. Among the past chairs are Carol Ann Weaver and Joanna Estelle. The current chair of the association is Julia Mermelstein.
