= Willi Brokmeier =

German operatic tenor (1928–2024)

- Willi Brokmeier, c. 1970
- Born: 8 April 1928; Bochum, Westphalia, Prussia, Germany
- Died: 18 May 2024 (aged 96)
- Education: Dortmund Conservatory
- Occupation: Operatic tenor
- Organizations: Staatstheater am Gärtnerplatz; Cologne Opera; Bavarian State Opera
- Title: Kammersänger

Willi Brokmeier (8 April 1928 – 18 May 2024) was a German operatic lyric tenor, based at the Bavarian State Opera. He focused on operetta roles, with an expressive voice and great acting talent, also appearing in several operetta films. He participated in world premieres such as Bernd Alois Zimmermann's Die Soldaten in 1965, Haydn's Le pescatrici and Ján Cikker's Das Spiel von Liebe und Tod, and performed at major European opera houses. One of his signature roles was Pedrillo in Mozart's Die Entführung aus dem Serail.

== Life and career ==
Born in Bochum on 8 April 1928, Brokmeier received his training as a lyric and buffo tenor at the Dortmund Conservatory. He took up his first engagement in 1953 at the Staatstheater Mainz. In 1955, he moved to the Deutsche Oper am Rhein in Düsseldorf, where he remained until 1961. He performed as David in Wagner's Die Meistersinger von Nürnberg there. He made guest appearances at renowned opera houses in Germany and Europe, such as with the company to the Netherlands in 1958, as Don Curzio in Mozart's Le nozze di Figaro and Scaramuccio in Ariadne auf Naxos by Richard Strauss. He performed at the Vienna State Opera in 1958 as Scaramuccio, repeating the role the following year at the Maggio Musicale Fiorentino. He appeared as Jacquino in Beethoven's Fidelio in 1960 on a tour to Japan, repeating it at the Teatro Regio Turin and the Deutsche Oper Berlin.

From 1961 Brokmeier was a member of the ensemble at the Staatstheater am Gärtnerplatz in Munich, when Arno Assmann was artistic director. When Assmann went to the Cologne Opera in 1964, Brokmeier followed him. He appeared there in the world premiere of Bernd Alois Zimmermann's Die Soldaten in 1965, as the Young Count. In 1966 he performed in the first performance of a new version of Haydn's Le pescatrici.

In 1967 Brokmeier returned to Munich and became a member of the Bavarian State Opera. In Vienna, he appeared in 1967 as Pedrillo in Mozart's Die Entführung aus dem Serail, which became one of his signature roles. He appeared in the German premiere of Richard Rodney Bennett's The Mines of Sulphur (Ballade im Moor) in 1967. He performed in the world premiere of Ján Cikker's Das Spiel von Liebe und Tod in 1979 and participated in Josef Tal's Die Versuchung (The Temptation) in 1976.

Brokmeier worked with conductors such as Carlos Kleiber and Karl Böhm. He was awarded the title Kammersänger in 1980.

Brokmeier appeared in television film adaptations of operettas, as Prinz Sternschnuppe in Paul Lincke's Frau Luna, as Richard in Leon Jessel's Schwarzwaldmädel, and as Ottokar in Der Zigeunerbaron. In 1972, he made a guest appearance in Heinz Schenk's popular television music show Zum Blauen Bock.

Brokmeier appeared as Monostatos in a recording of Mozart's Die Zauberflöte conducted by Wolfgang Sawallisch in the early 1970s, alongside Kurt Moll as Sarastro, Edda Moser as the Queen of the Night and Peter Schreier as Tamino; a reviewer from Gramophone described him as "an excellent Monostatos, sharply characterized and neatly sung". He performed the role of the Song Seller in a 1973 video of Puccini's Il tabarro from the Bavarian State Opera conducted by Sawallisch. It was sung in German, with Dietrich Fischer-Dieskau and Júlia Várady. Brokmeier participated in a rare recording of Schubert's Der vierjährige Posten, in 1998, conducted by Heinz Wallberg. Brokmeier recorded several complete operettas and excerpt from them, including Emmerich Kálmán's Gräfin Mariza and Die Csárdásfürstin, and Léhar's Die lustige Witwe and Das Land des Lächelns. He recorded opera roles in Mozart's Le nozze di Figaro conducted by Otto Klemperer, Orff's Die Kluge, Korngold's Die tote Stadt, Acanta in Feuersnot (by Richard Strauss), and Matteo in Arabella by Richard Strauss from La Fenice in Venice.

Brokmeier died on 18 May 2024, at the age of 96.

== Filmography ==
Brokmeier played in a number of filmed operas and operettas:

- 1963: Schneider Wibbel
- 1971: Geschichten über Frauen der Geschichte OCLC 603666081
- 1973: Schwarzwaldmädel
- 1975: Frau Luna
- 1975: Der Zigeunerbaron
