= Rhené Jaque =

Canadian Musician, Composer & Music Educator

Rhené Jaque, the pen name of Marguerite Marie Alice Cartier (February 4, 1918 – July 31, 2006), was a Canadian musician, composer and music educator living in Quebec.

== Early life and education ==
Born in Beauharnois, she joined the Sisters of the Holy Names of Jesus and Mary and, in 1938, took the name Sister Jacques-René. She studied at the École supérieure de musique d'Outremont with Claude Champagne, Marvin Duchow, Louis Bailly and Camille Couture. Cartier took the pen name Rhené Jaque at Champagnes' insistence that her music would not sell if people knew she was both a woman and a member of a religious order, and so he suggested she simply invert her nun's name.

In 1943, she began teaching violin and music theory at the École de musique Vincent-d'Indy. She obtained a BMus degree in 1949 and a Lauréat in music in 1955. In the summer of 1972, Jaque studied composition at the Académie internationale d'été de Nice, France with Tony Aubin.

== Compositions ==
In addition to her professional level works, Cartier composed many teaching pieces for pianists and violinists, often featuring atonal techniques. Rachel Cavalho recorded Jaque's Rustic Dance/Fête champêtre and Deux Inventions à deux voix. Her Toccate was recorded by Elaine Keillor. One of her two Suites for piano was recorded by Antonín Kubálek and by Allen Reiser. She was a member of the Canadian League of Composers and a life member of the Association of Canadian Women Composers.

She died in Montreal at the age of 88.
