= Ann Southam =

Canadian composer (1937–2010)

- Born: 4 February 1937; Winnipeg, Manitoba, Canada
- Died: 25 November 2010 (aged 73); Toronto, Ontario, Canada
- Occupation: Composer

Ann Southam, CM (4 February 1937 – 25 November 2010) was a Canadian composer and music teacher. She is known for her minimalist-influenced style, her work in electronic music, her long-term collaborations with performers and choreographers, her large body of work, and, according to The Globe and Mail, "blazing a trail for women composers in a notoriously sexist field".

She was appointed a Member of the Order of Canada in 2010.

== Biography ==
Southam was born in Winnipeg, Manitoba, on 4 February 1937. She was the great-great-granddaughter of Canadian newspaper baron William Southam, and benefited from the inherited wealth of the family business. At the age of three, her family moved to Toronto, where Southam lived for the rest of her life.

Southam attended the private Bishop Strachan School for girls in Toronto, and dropped out after a year of Shaw's Business School for secretarial studies. Throughout this time she developed an interest in music. She began composing in 1952 at age 15 after attending a summer music camp at the Banff School (now the Banff Centre for Arts and Creativity) in Banff, Alberta.

After dropping out of secretarial school, she studied piano and composition with Samuel Dolin, who introduced her to electronic music, at the Royal Conservatory of Music in Toronto. She studied piano with Pierre Souvairan and electronic music with Gustav Ciamaga at the University of Toronto from 1960 to 1963. In 1966, she began teaching electroacoustic composition at the Royal Conservatory.

In 1966, she was introduced to Patricia Beatty, a Canadian choreographer who had just returned from studying modern dance in New York. Shortly afterward, Southam began working on a new score for Beatty's adaptation of Macbeth and the two became friends. With this relationship as the catalyst, she began a collaboration with the New Dance Group of Canada (now the Toronto Dance Theatre) in 1967, where she became composer-in-residence in 1968. Over her life she composed around 30 pieces for the group, as well as quietly supplying it with financial support.

In the 1970s, when Southam was in her thirties, she came out as a lesbian to her mother.

In 1977, she created Music Inter Alia, a concert promotion organization in Winnipeg that existed until 1991, with Diana McIntosh. She founded, with Mary Gardiner, the Association of Canadian Women Composers in 1981. She was its first president (1980–88), a life member (2002), and its honorary president (2007). She was also an associate composer of the Canadian Music Centre.

Southam wrote work commissioned by organizations including the Canada Council, the Ontario Arts Council, the Music Gallery, and the CBC.

She was diagnosed with lung cancer in 2008, and died in Toronto aged 73 on 25 November 2010. Pianists Eve Egoyan and Christina Petrowska-Quilico performed at her memorial.

== Music ==
Southam's early works are lyrical atonal pieces written in a Romantic style, and lyricism remained an important element of her later electronic work. She also worked with the twelve-tone technique.

Southam has been described as having "composed with exacting technique, intent on coaxing warmth out of her machines and bringing electronic music into new spaces". Her passion for electronic music began in the 1960s, and she built a home studio with synthesizers, tape recorders, a mixer, and what she called a "minimum of sound equipment", including Electronic Music Studios synthesizers.

In the 1970s, Southam purchased a house and installed a grand piano, where she began to compose purely acoustic pieces for the first time: first Rivers and then Glass Houses. She asked Christina Petrowska-Quilico to record the pieces; by 1982, Petrowska-Quilico had begun to perform the pieces live.

In the 1980s, Southam began developing an interest in American minimalists Terry Riley and Steve Reich. Her composition Glass Houses (1981) is constructed from short tonal units that combine and re-combine, creating an overall sense of lyricism. In the 1990s, Southam largely abandoned electronic music and began creating instrumental works such as Song of the Varied Thrush (1991) for string quartet; Webster's Spin (1993) for string orchestra, and Full Circles (1996, rev. 2005).

Of her work and interest in incorporating feminism, Southam said:

I was looking for a way of writing music that would have a feminist aesthetic, because what was thought of as feminist music back in those days was usually vocal music, and it would be the words that would give the feminist meaning. I wanted something where the very workings of the music would reflect a feminist aesthetic.

Southam found that minimalist, iterative compositions reminded her of "women's work" – repetitive, monotonous tasks such as knitting and cleaning that nevertheless sustain life.

Southam's favorite quotes about herself were "staggeringly boring" (from the Montreal Gazette), and "a rather shadowy presence on the new-music scene" (from The Globe and Mail).

=== Collaborations ===
Ann Southam worked for over thirty years with pianist Christina Petrowska-Quilico on Rivers (2005), Pond Life (2008), and Glass Houses, which was revised by Southam in 2009 and by Petrowska-Quilico in 2010. These resulted in 6 CDs. Petrowska-Quilico also toured Rivers with the Toronto Dance Theatre in Toronto at the Premiere Dance Theatre, Harbourfront; in Ottawa at the National Arts Centre; in Halifax; in St. John (New Brunswick) and St. John's, Newfoundland, and other cities.

Southam was first introduced to pianist Eve Egoyan in 1998, when David Jaeger of the Canadian Electronic Ensemble suggested Egoyan play on a new recording he was producing. Southam worked on several collaborative projects with Egoyan throughout the 1990s and 2000s, including Qualities of Consonance (1998), Figures (2001), In Retrospect (2004), and Simple Lines of Enquiry (2008).

== Awards ==
Southam received the Friends of Canadian Music Award in 2002.

In 2010, Southam was named a Member of the Order of Canada but was too ill to attend the ceremony. The award recognized her "for her contributions as one of Canada's prominent women composers, known for electronic, acoustic and orchestral works, and as a philanthropist and committed volunteer".

In 2011, Southam was posthumously nominated for a Juno Award for her composition "Glass House #5".

== Legacy ==
Southam left $14 million to the Canadian Women's Foundation, creating the Ann Southam Empowerment Fund and investing in the Girls' Fund. This was, at the time, the largest private donation to a Canadian woman's organization.

Southam's published works remain the property of the Canadian Music Centre. The Centre named its recording collection the Ann Southam Digital Audio Archive in her honor. Her personal archives are held by the Banff Centre Paul D. Fleck Library and Archives.

Southam left five unfinished works that were intended to be performed by Eve Egoyan; Egoyan recorded and released the performances as 5: Music of Ann Southam in 2013. The disc is described as "a continuation of the composer's fascination with very slow, kaleidoscopic transformation of sound using a few very simple chords inside of which a tone row gradually unfolds at the speed of a tulip blossom opening on a warm, sunny spring morning".

== Selected compositions ==
=== Piano ===
- Suite for Piano (1960)
- Four Bagatelles (1961)
- Sea Flea (1962)
- Three in Blue (1965)
- Quodlibet (1967)
- Five Pieces in a Jazz Manner (1970)
- Five Shades of Blue (1970)
- Rivers: Set 1 (1979); Set 2 (1979); Set 3 (1981)
- Cool Blue; Red Hot (1980)
- Four in Hand (1981)
- Glass Houses (15 pieces, 1981)
- Soundings for a New Piano (1986)
- Spatial View of Pond (1986)
- In a Measure of Time (1988)
- Remembering Schubert (1993)
- Where? (1995)
- Qualities of Consonance (1998)
- Two by Two (2000)
- In Retrospect (2004)
- Commotion creek (2007)
- Simple Lines of Enquiry (2007)
- Pond Life (2008)

=== Chamber ===
- Rhapsodic Interlude for Violin Alone (1963)
- Momentum (1967)
- Configurations (1973)
- CounterPlay (1973)
- Integruities (G. Arbour, M. Thompson) (1975)
- Interviews (Arbour, Thompson) (1976)
- Towards Green (1976)
- Waves (1976)
- Networks (1978)
- Re-tuning (1985)
- Quintet, for piano, 2 violins, viola, and cello (1986)
- Alternate Currents, Percussion Music for Solo Performer (1987)
- Throughways: Improvising Music (1988)
- Song of the Varied Thrush (1991)
- The Music So Far (1992)
- This Time (1992)
- Webster's Spin, for string orchestra (1993)
- Full Circles (1996 rev. 2005)
- Music for Strings (2000)
- Figures: Music for Piano and String Orchestra (2001)

=== Electronic ===
- A Thread of Sand (1969)
- Boat, River, Moon (1972)
- Sky-Sails (1973)
- L'Assassin Menace (1974)
- Mythic Journey (1974)
- Walls and Passageways (1974)
- The Reprieve (1975)
- Nighthawks (1976)
- Rude Awakening (1976)
- Soundplay (1978)
- Seastill (1979)
- The Story's Dream (1980)
- The Emerging Ground (1983)
- Rewind (1984)
- Music for Slow Dancing (1985)
- Goblin Market (1986)
- Fluke Sound (1989)

== Discography ==
- Canadian Music for Piano. Louise Bessette piano. 1993. CBC Records MVCD 1064
- Virtuoso Piano Music of Our Own Time. Christina Petrowska piano. 1993. JLH Lasersound JLH 1002 DDD
- Mystic Streams. Christina Petrowska Quilico piano. 1996. Welspringe CD WEL001
- Northern Sirens. Christina Petrowska Quilico piano. 1998. York Fine Arts YFA00999
- Seastill: The Electronic Music of Ann Southam. 1998. Furiant Records FMDC 4604-2
- Fluke Sound. Furiant Records FMDC 4677-2
- Glass Houses: Music of Ann Southam. Eve Egoyan piano, Stephen Clarke piano. 1999. CBC Records MVCD 1124
- Canadian Composer Portraits – Ann Southam. Christina Petrowska Quilico piano, Eitan Cornfield producer/narrator. 2005. Centrediscs CMCCD 10505 (3 CDs)
- Simple Lines of Enquiry. Eve Egoyan piano. 2009. Centrediscs CMCCD 14609
- Pond Life. Christina Petrowska Quilico piano. 2009. Centrediscs CMCCD 14109 (2 CDs)
- Glass Houses Revisited. Christina Petrowska Quilico piano. 2011. Centrediscs CMCCD 16511
- Glass Houses Volume 2. Christina Petrowska Quilico piano. 2014. Centrediscs CMCCD 20114
- Glass Houses Complete. Christina Petrowska Quilico piano. 2015. Centrediscs CMCCD 22215
- Soundspinning. Christina Petrowska Quilico piano. 2018. Centrediscs CMCCD 26018

== See also ==
- Music of Canada
- List of Canadian composers
