= Susanne Marsee =

American mezzo-soprano (born 1941)

Susanne Marsee (born Susan Irene Dowell; November 26, 1941, San Diego, California) is an American mezzo-soprano of note, particularly acclaimed as a singing-actress.

Her principal teacher was Nadine Conner, and her educational background includes a Bachelor of Arts from the University of California at Los Angeles, and advanced studies at the American Opera Center of The Juilliard School. She is of Greek, English, and French heritage.

Susanne Marsee.

== New York City Opera ==
Raised in Westchester, California, Marsee was the New York City Opera's leading mezzo-soprano from 1970, when she debuted as Sara, Duchess of Nottingham, opposite Beverly Sills, Plácido Domingo, and Louis Quilico, in Donizetti's Roberto Devereux, with Julius Rudel conducting Tito Capobianco's production.

She proceeded to sing a great gallery of roles at the City Opera, including Siébel in Faust, Angelina in La Cenerentola, Rosina in Il barbiere di Siviglia, Sesto in Giulio Cesare, Cherubino in Le nozze di Figaro (opposite Michael Devlin), Nicklausse in Les contes d'Hoffmann (with Sills and Norman Treigle), Dorabella in Così fan tutte (with Patricia Brooks), Octavian in Der Rosenkavalier (with Johanna Meier), Maddalena in Rigoletto (opposite José Carreras), Giovanna Seymour in Anna Bolena, the Composer in Ariadne auf Naxos (with Carol Neblett), Maffio Orsini in Lucrezia Borgia (with Sills), the title role of La belle Hélène, Zaida in Il turco in Italia, Estella Drummle in the world premiere of Miss Havisham's Fire (with Rita Shane), Doña Manuela in La loca, Mariana in the world premiere of The Student from Salamanca, Sesto in La clemenza di Tito, Néris in the Italian version of Médée (with Marisa Galvany), the name part in Carmen (in Frank Corsaro's production), the title role of La Grande-Duchesse de Gérolstein, Prince Charmant in Cendrillon, Mallika in Lakmé, Bellino in Casanova's Homecoming, Adalgisa in Norma, Dulcinée in Don Quichotte, Charlotte in Werther (with Jon Garrison), Valencienne in Die lustige Witwe, Marcellina in Le nozze di Figaro (with Herbert Perry as Figaro), Suzuki in Madama Butterfly, La chatte in L'enfant et les sortilèges, Berta in Il barbiere di Siviglia, Rose in the world premiere of Marilyn, and Marta in Mefistofele, as well as musical comedy.

== United States ==
She appeared with companies in Baton Rouge (Giulietta in Les contes d'Hoffmann, with Paul Groves), Boston (Rosina in Il barbiere di Siviglia for Opera New England, and Maddalena in Rigoletto for Boston Opera Group, both directed by Sarah Caldwell), Cincinnati (Rigoletto and Roberto Devereux), Columbus (Prince Orlovsky in Die Fledermaus, and Marcellina in Le nozze di Figaro), Connecticut (Hänsel in Hänsel und Gretel; Dinah in Trouble in Tahiti; and Nicklausse in Les contes d'Hoffmann, opposite Nicolai Gedda), Fort Worth (Cherubino), Houston (Preziosilla in La forza del destino), Memphis (Ariadne auf Naxos), Michigan (title role in The Maid of Orléans), Milwaukee (Laura in La Gioconda, with Gilda Cruz-Romo and Harry Theyard), New Orleans (Urbain in Les Huguenots), Omaha (Cherubino in Le nozze di Figaro, and the name part in La périchole), Philadelphia (Rigoletto, opposite Luciano Pavarotti; Cherubino, with Treigle and Richard Fredricks; and Anna Bolena, with Renata Scotto), Pittsburgh (Rigoletto), St Paul (world premiere of Casanova's Homecoming, for the Minnesota Opera), San Antonio (Nicklausse in Les contes d'Hoffmann), San Diego (Cherubino in Le nozze di Figaro; Così fan tutte; the world premiere of La loca; Giulietta in Un giorno di regno; the Verdi Requiem; Anna Bolena, with Katia Ricciarelli; and Cuniza in Oberto, with Ferruccio Furlanetto), San Francisco (as Shelly Ward in the world premiere of Angle of Repose, with Nancy Shade and Chester Ludgin; La forza del destino, with Anna Tomowa-Sintow, then Raina Kabaivanska, Renato Bruson, and Paul Plishka; Faust, with Giacomo Aragall; and as Barbara in Kát'a Kabanová, with Elisabeth Söderström and William Cochran, conducted by Rafael Kubelík), Washington DC (Sesto in Giulio Cesare, with Tatiana Troyanos and June Anderson, for the Handel Festival), as well as the Friends of French Opera (in Armide) at Carnegie Hall, and Wolf Trap (Cherubino, opposite Joy Clements and Phyllis Curtin; Roberto Devereux; and Carmen).

She sang performances of Rossini's Stabat mater for the Cincinnati May Festival (with Leontyne Price, 1971) and the Dayton Philharmonic Orchestra (with Galvany, 1987).

== Marriages ==
Susan Dowell married, first, Frederic E. Marsee, on May 23, 1964. The marriage later ended in divorce. She then married Brett Hamilton, which ended in divorce. She married Mark Weinstein in 1987.

== Abroad ==
Abroad, she appeared at Calgary (La Cenerentola and Norma), the Canary Islands Festival (as Zerlina in Don Giovanni, with Samuel Ramey; and Anna Bolena), Caracas (Così fan tutte), the Cervantes Festival (Don Quichotte, and Orfeo in Orfeo ed Euridice), Mexico City (Don Quichotte and Orfeo ed Euridice), Montreal (Rosina in Il barbiere di Siviglia), and the Taiwanese Opera Festival. In 1972, she made her only commercial recording, for Westminster, as Nicklausse in Les contes d'Hoffmann, opposite Sills and Treigle, conducted by Rudel.

In 1977, she made her European debut at the Spoleto Festival in Così fan tutte, and then appeared at the Aix-en-Provence Festival in Roberto Devereux, with Montserrat Caballé, Carreras, and Vicente Sardinero.

== Television ==
Marsee was seen in a number of PBS television broadcasts: Rachel, la cubana (as Lucile; world premiere, conducted by the composer, Hans Werner Henze, 1974), Roberto Devereux (with Sills, 1975), Il turco in Italia (with Sills and Donald Gramm, 1978), La Cenerentola (with Rockwell Blake and Alan Titus, 1980), Rigoletto (1988), A Little Night Music (with Regina Resnik, 1990) and Le nozze di Figaro (as Marcellina, 1991).

== Farewell ==
Her final appearances at the City Opera were as Mistress Bentson in Lakmé (opposite Elizabeth Futral), in 1994. The following year (twenty-five years after her debut), she sang her farewell performance, in the cameo rôle of Alisa in the Capobianco production of Lucia di Lammermoor, for the Pittsburgh Opera.

Since her retirement from the stage, Miss Marsee has concentrated on vocal pedagogy, and has held positions at Louisiana State University (1991–92), American Musical and Dramatic Academy (New York City, 1994–97), Pittsburgh CLO Academy (1997–99), City Music Center of Duquesne University (1998–2000), Carnegie Mellon University (1999–2008), and Catholic University of America (2008–11).

In 2015, Opera Depot published her 1976 performance of Lucrezia Borgia, with Sills and Henry Price, conducted by Rudel, on Compact Discs. Later the same year, they published the 1975 Anna Bolena, with Scotto and Ramey, conducted by Rudel. In 2016, they published the Aix-en-Provence Roberto Devereux, to mark Carreras's 70th birthday.

== Commercial recordings ==
- Offenbach: Les contes d'Hoffmann (Sills, Burrows, Treigle; Rudel, 1972) Deutsche Grammophon (audio)
- Donizetti: Roberto Devereux (Sills, J.Alexander, Fredricks; Rudel, Capobianco, 1975) [live] VAI (video)

== Bibliography ==
- Who's Who in Opera, edited by Maria F. Rich, Arno Press, 1976.
- The New York City Opera: An American Adventure, by Martin L. Sokol (Annals by George Louis Mayer), Macmillan Publishing Co, Inc, 1981; ISBN 0-02-612280-4
- Uttering Lamentations, by Brian Morgan, 2023; ISBN 979-8859701070.
