= Olapa =

Moon goddess in Maasai mythology

Olapa, goddess of the moon, is married to Enkai (Ngai), god of the sun in Maasai mythology.

== Mythology ==
The two fought one day, and Olapa, being a short tempered woman, inflicted Enkai with a wound. To hide his shame, he took to shining very brightly, so that no one could look straight at him. In revenge, Enkai hit Olapa back and struck out one of her eyes. This can be seen today, when the moon is full.

== Name ==
The word for moon and month (olapa) carries the masculine gender form 'ol' in the prefix.
