= Christina Petrowska-Quilico =

Canadian classical pianist (born 1948)

Christina Petrowska Quilico
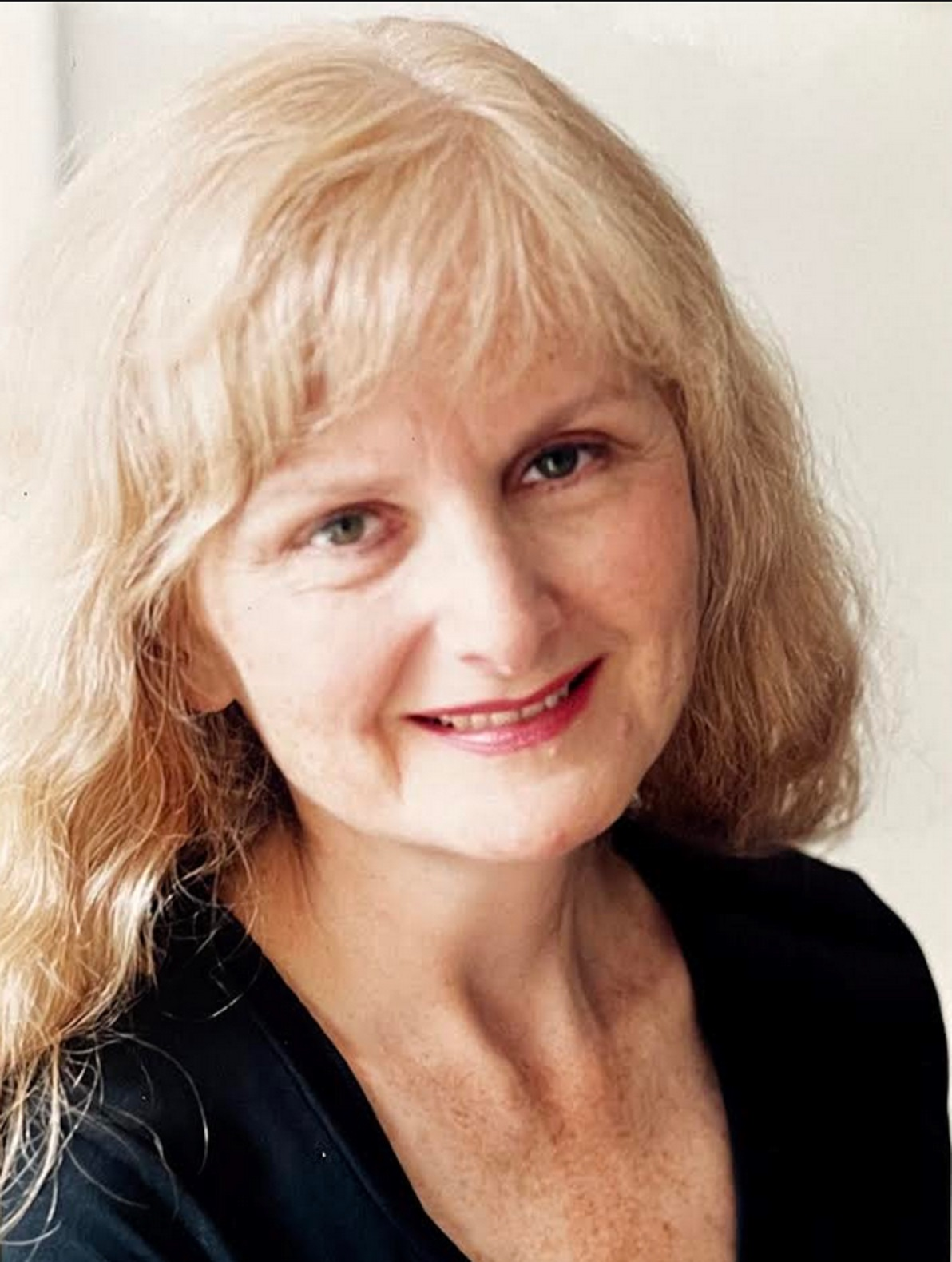
- Petrowska Quilico in 2000
- Born: Christina Petrowska; 1948 77 years old Ottawa, Ontario, Canada
- Spouses: Michel-Georges Brégent (died 1993) Louis Quilico (m. 1993; died 2000)

Academic background
- Education: BMUS, 1968, MSC, 1970, Juilliard School

Academic work
- Discipline: Music
- Institutions: York University
- Website: christinapetrowskaquilico.com

Christina Petrowska Quilico CM OOnt FRSC is a Canadian pianist. She is a professor emerita, senior scholar at York University in Toronto, Ontario, Canada. She was appointed to the Order of Canada in 2020 "For her celebrated career as a classical and contemporary pianist and for championing Canadian music." In 2021, she was named a Fellow of the Royal Society of Canada. In 2022, she was appointed to the Order of Ontario for having "opened the ears of music lovers internationally through numerous classical and contemporary performances.... As a Professor of Musicology and Piano at York University, she has received esteemed research awards. As a benefactor, she established The Christina and Louis Quilico Award at the Ontario Arts Foundation and the Canadian Opera Company." She was presented with the Ontario Arts Council's Oskar Morawetz Award for Excellence in Music Performance, "recognizing talent and commitment to Canadian music", in October 2023.

As well, the Canadian Broadcasting Corporation named her one of “Canada’s 25 best classical pianists”, and inducted her into its “In Concert Hall of Fame”.

== Early life and education ==
Petrowska Quilico was born in 1948 in Ottawa, Ontario. Barely four months after turning 14, she made her performance debut at The Town Hall in New York City (May 4, 1963). She was attending the Juilliard School, where she went on to obtain her Bachelor of Music and Master's degree.

== Career ==
After graduating from Juilliard, Petrowska Quilico went for post-graduate studies to Paris. She studied with Karlheinz Stockhausen and György Ligeti at the Darmstädter Ferienkurse, and began teaching. She later taught at The Royal Conservatory of Music, Carleton University and University of Ottawa before joining the faculty of music at York University in 1987. She is a leading performer of Canadian music, and her catalogue of 50-some discs includes many recordings of solo repertoire as well as chamber works and concertos on the Canadian Music Centre's Centrediscs label. Her double album of the complete Glass Houses cycle by her late friend, composer Ann Southam, "remains Centrediscs' best-selling CD of all time". As a duo with violinist Jacques Israelievitch, she recorded an album of Canadian music on Centrediscs and the Mozart violin and piano sonatas on the Fleur de Son label. In 1992, astronaut Steve MacLean brought her recording of Alexina Louie's Star-Filled Night on his first mission to the Space Shuttle Columbia. In 2006, on board the Space Shuttle Atlantis, MacLean took the recording of her as soloist in the world premiere performance of David Mott's piano concerto Eclipse. A visual artist as well, she has created the covers for several of her CDs, notably Sound Visionaries, and the Centrediscs CDs Worlds Apart and Soundspinning.

In 2007, Petrowska Quilico received the Friends of Canadian Music Award from the Canadian Music Centre and Canadian League of Composers.

Following her 2020 appointment as a member of the Order of Canada, in May 2021 she was a winner of the York University Research Awards, and that September was named a Fellow of the Royal Society of Canada. The Order of Ontario was accorded her in 2022. She also received a second York University Research Award in 2022, her third in 2023 as one of two given Distinguished Honours, and a fourth in 2024 for “Remarkable Artistic & Creative Accomplishments”.

== Personal life ==
Petrowska-Quilico was married to composer Michel-Georges Brégent until his death in 1993. She subsequently remarried, to baritone Louis Quilico, CC. Following his death in 2000, in his memory she created The Christina and Louis Quilico Award, which is administered by the Ontario Arts Foundation and held every two years under the auspices of the Canadian Opera Company.

== Selected discography ==
=== Orchestral / Concertos / Small Ensembles ===
- "Shadow & Light: Canadian Double Concertos" Centrediscs, CD-CMCCD 31823. (2023) Larysa Kuzmenko: Skartaris, Alice Ho: Capriccio Ballo, Christos Hatzis: Arabesque, with Marc Djokic, violin; Sinfonia Toronto, Nurhan Arman, conductor
- "Tapestries" Centrediscs, CD-CMCCD 17011. (2011) Heather Schmidt: Piano Concerto No. 2 with the Kitchener-Waterloo Symphony Orchestra, Daniel Warren, conductor. Concerto nominated for Juno Award, Juno Awards of 2012#Classical Composition of the Year
- "3 Concerti" Centrediscs, CD-CMCCD 15610. (2010) Piano concerti by Violet Archer, Larysa Kuzmenko, and Alexina Louie with the CBC Vancouver Orchestra, Sir John Eliot Gardiner, conductor; the Toronto Symphony with Jukka Pekka Saraste, conductor; and the National Arts Centre Orchestra, Alex Pauk, conductor. Kuzmenko concerto nominated for Juno Award, Juno Awards of 2011#Classical Composition of the Year
- David Mott "Eclipse" Centrediscs, CD-CMCCD 12707. (2007) Piano concerto with the World Chamber Ensemble, Mark Chambers, conductor. Also, solo piano music.
- "Mozart Sonatas and Variations for Piano and Violin Volumes 1 & 2" Fleur de Son/Naxos, FDS58034 & FDS58040. (2016, 2017) With Jacques Israelievitch, violin. American Record Guide Critic's Choice (Vol. 2), 2018
- "Vocal Gems (live from New York)", with Louis Quilico, baritone, Welspringe (2003).
- "Mr. Rigoletto: My Life in Music" Analekta, FL 2 3143. (2000) Baritone Louis Quilico performs Italian and French opera arias with various orchestras and art songs with Petrowska Quilico as pianist.

=== Solo albums ===
- "More Rivers" Navona Records, NV6689. (2025) Frank Horvat: More Rivers, a suite of seven solo piano pieces commissioned by Petrowska Quilico
- "Games of the Night Wind" Navona Records, NV6630 (2024) World premiere recording of 12 Nocturnes by David Jaeger; and night-inspired works by Henryk Gorecki, Toru Takemitsu, and Alexander Tansman.
- "Blaze" Centrediscs, CMCCD 31323. (2023) Solo piano works by Alice Ho
- "Vintage Americana" Navona Records, NV6384. (2021) Works by Lowell Liebermann, David Del Tredici, Frederic Rzewski, David Jaeger, Mario Davidovsky and Paul Huebner
- "Retro Americana" Navona Records, NV6361. (2021) Works by Henry Cowell, Frederic Rzewski, George Gershwin, Bill Westcott, Meredith Monk and Art Tatum
- "Sound Visionaries" Navona Records, NV6358. (2021) Debussy: Preludes Book 2; Messiaen: 7 of the Vingt Regards sur l'Enfant Jésus; Pierre Boulez: first and third sonatas
- Ann Southam "Soundspinning" Centrediscs, CD-CMCCD 26018. (2018) Early works
- "Global Sirens" Fleur de Son/Naxos, FDS 58046. (2018) Rare works by women composers from around the world
- "Worlds Apart" Centrediscs, CD-CMCCD 23717. (2017) 2-CD set, comprising "Classics with a Twist": Works by John Rea (composer), Steven Gellman and Peter Paul Koprowski; and "Worlds Apart": Works by David Jaeger, Diana MacIntosh, Micheline Coulombe Saint Marcoux, Patrick Cardy and Michel-Georges Brégent
- Ann Southam "Glass Houses Vol. 1 & 2" Centrediscs, CD-CMCCD 22215: the complete 15 Glass Houses, comprising "Glass Houses Volume 2" Centrediscs, CD-CMCCD 20114. (2014); and "Glass Houses Revisited" 9 revised Glass Houses. Centrediscs, CD-CMCCD 16511. (2011) Nominated for Juno Award, Juno Awards of 2012#Classical Composition of the Year
- Ernesto Nazareth "Tangos Brasileiros" Marquis Classics, MAR81519. (2013) Two CD set
- Constantine Caravassilis "Visions: The Complete Books of Rhapsodies and Fantasias" Centrediscs, CMCCD 18613. (2013) A two CD set, with cover and booklet art by Christina Petrowska Quilico
- Ann Southam "Pond Life" Centrediscs, CMCCD 14109. (2009) A 2-CD set
- "Canadian Composers Portraits: Ann Southam" Centrediscs, CMCCD 10505. (2005) A 3-CD set of the cycle Rivers.
- Michel-Georges Brégent "16 PORTRAITS" Centrediscs, CMCCD 10805. (2005) A 2-CD set of the Romantic Etudes
