= Bernhard Kontarsky =

German conductor, pianist, and teacher (born 1937)

- Born: 26 April 1937 (age 89); Iserlohn, Germany
- Education: Hochschule für Musik Köln
- Occupations: Conductor; Pianist; Academic teacher
- Organizations: Frankfurt University of Music and Performing Arts
- Family: Aloys and Alfons Kontarsky (brothers)

Bernhard Kontarsky (born 26 April 1937 in Iserlohn) is a German conductor, pianist, and teacher. He conducted notable world premieres.

Kontarsky studied at the Hochschule für Musik Köln. In 1964 he began his conducting career as Kapellmeister at the Staatstheater Stuttgart. From 1981 Kontarsky has been Professor of Orchestral Conducting at the Frankfurt University of Music and Performing Arts.

Kontarsky is well regarded as a specialist in new music. Amongst other things, he conducted the world premieres of El Rey de Harlem by Hans Werner Henze (1982), Die Erschöpfung der Welt by Mauricio Kagel (1980), Don Quijote de la Mancha by Hans Zender (1993), Sansibar by Eckehard Mayer (13 April 1994), as well as the first German performance of the opera Die Wände by Adriana Hölszky, at the Frankfurt Opera, on 30 January 2000. In 1988 he directed a well-regarded production in Stuttgart of Bernd Alois Zimmermann's opera Die Soldaten, a work he was previously involved with as co-repetiteur for the world premiere in 1965. This led to the second commercial recording of the work, released on CD in 1991. He also conducted the French premiere of Die Soldaten in April 1994 at the Opéra-Bastille. He is also the conductor on the first CD recording of Luigi Nono's opera Intolleranza 1960.

Kontarsky is the younger brother of the duo pianists Aloys and Alfons Kontarsky, with whom he has occasionally appeared in a triple-piano ensemble.
