= Nancy Shade =

American soprano

Nancy Shade (born May 31, 1946, in Rockford, Illinois) is an American spinto soprano, best known as a singing-actress. She made her formal debut as Leonora in Il trovatore, in Louisville, in 1967. In 1971, she made her first of many appearances at the New York City Opera, as Musetta in La bohème. She also sang there in Mefistofele (directed by Tito Capobianco), Madama Butterfly (opposite José Carreras), Pagliacci, Susannah, and Die tote Stadt (in Frank Corsaro's production).

In 1973, Shade sang the title role of Manon Lescaut (opposite Harry Theyard) at the Spoleto Festival, under the direction of Luchino Visconti conducted by Thomas Schippers. The following year, she sang in a Concert Version of Mefistofele at London's Royal Festival Hall, opposite Norman Treigle in the name part. In 1976 she created the role of Barbara in the world premiere of Gian Carlo Menotti's The Hero (conducted by Christopher Keene) with the Opera Company of Philadelphia. That same year she made her Covent Garden debut as Giorgetta in Il tabarro, and in 1979, performed the eponymous role of Lulu at the Santa Fe Opera, which was the American premiere of the completed, three-act version of the masterpiece. Also in Santa Fe, she appeared in La traviata (1976), Salome (1976), Erwartung (1980) and We Come to the River (1984).

For the New Orleans Opera Association, she sang in Manon Lescaut (1974), a double-bill of Il tabarro and Pagliacci (1976), as well as La bohème (as Mimì, 1978). At the San Francisco Opera, in 1976, the soprano appeared in the world premiere of Andrew Imbrie's Angle of Repose (with Chester Ludgin and Susanne Marsee), and returned the following year for Marguerite in Faust under the direction of Jean Périsson. She also was seen at the San Diego Opera, in Mefistofele (conducted by Werner Torkanowsky, 1973), La traviata (1977) and Falstaff (1978). The soprano was also heard in the United States premiere of Lowell Liebermann's The Picture of Dorian Gray, at the Florentine Opera, in 1999, which was broadcast over NPR.

In 1986, she sang Zoe in the world premiere of Hans Zender's Stephen Climax at the Oper Frankfurt.

One of Shade's greatest successes was as Marie in Zimmermann's fiercely difficult Die Soldaten, which was recorded (with Bernhard Kontarsky conducting, 1988–89) and filmed (in Harry Kupfer's production, 1989). She sang the work at the Vienna Staatsoper in 1990, which was preceded by Salome. In a different vein, she was in the first complete recording of the musical comedy The Most Happy Fella (as Marie), alongside Louis Quilico, which was published in 2000. In the same year, the soprano was also acclaimed for her performance as the Woman in Erwartung, at the Prague State Opera.
