= Luigi Ottolini =

Italian opera singer (1925–2002)

Luigi Ottolini (1960 dedication)

Luigi Ottolini (23 August 1925, Milan – 16 March 2002, Suardi) was an Italian operatic tenor noted for his appearances in the 1960 recording of Verdi's Requiem with Joan Sutherland, Fiorenza Cossotto and Carlo Maria Giulini, the 1961 Turin recording of Verdi's Don Carlos with Boris Christoff and the 1963 recording of scenes from Verdi's Aida with Birgit Nilsson. Though celebrated in the 1960s, Ottolini is now barely known. He appeared as Radames in Verdi's Aida for the Welsh National Opera in 1971, reprising the same role in 1974 in the Baths of Caracalla, Rome.
